= Athletics at the 1962 British Empire and Commonwealth Games – Men's 220 yards =

Men's 220 yards at the 1962 British Empire and Commonwealth Games
- Venue: Perry Lakes Stadium
- Date: 26 November 1962 (rounds 1, 2 and semis); 29 November 1962 (final)
- Competitors: 43 from 22 nations
- Winning time: 21.1 s

Medalists
| gold medal | Seraphino Antao | Kenya |
| silver medal | David Jones | England |
| bronze medal | Johan du Preez | Rhodesia and Nyasaland |

The men's 220 yards at the 1962 British Empire and Commonwealth Games as part of the athletics programme was held at the Perry Lakes Stadium on Monday 26 November and Thursday 29 November 1962.

The top four runners in each of the initial six heats qualified for the second round. Those 24 runners competed in four heats in the second round, with the top three runners from each heat qualifying for the semifinals. There were two semifinals, and only the top three from each heat advanced to the final.

The event was won by Kenyan Seraphino Antao in 21.1 seconds, who also won the 100 yards earlier in the meet. Antao finished 0.4 seconds ahead of Englishman David Jones and 0.5 seconds ahead Johan du Preez representing the Federation of Rhodesia and Nyasaland who won bronze. Antao equalled the Games record of 20.9 seconds in the first semi final, whilst the second semi final saw the defending championship Tom Robinson and the world record holder Peter Radford fail to make to the final, finishing fourth and fifth respectively.

Two of the favourites pulled out of the event prior to their heats. Canadian Harry Jerome, who pulled up 30 yards of the finish line in the 100 yards final, pulled out due to a torn muscle in his left thigh and tonsillitis. Whilst Jamaican Dennis Johnson, who finished fifth in 100 yards, withdrew due to a groin injury.

== Records ==
| World record | Peter Radford (GBR); Paul Drayton (USA) | 20.5 | Wolverhampton, England, UK; Walnut, California, United States | 28 May 1960; 23 June 1962 |
| Commonwealth record | | | | |
| Games record | Tom Robinson (BAH); Edward Jefferys (SAF) | 20.9 | Cardiff, Wales | 23 July 1958 |

The following records were established during the competition:

| Date | Event | Name | Nationality | Time | Record |
|---|---|---|---|---|---|
| 26 November | Semifinal | Seraphino Antao | Kenya | 20.9 | =GR |

== Round 1 ==
=== Heat 1 ===
| Rank | Name | Nationality | Time | Notes |
|---|---|---|---|---|
| 1 | Michael Okantey | Ghana | 21.5 | Q |
| 2 | Nick Whitehead | Wales | 22.3 | Q |
| 3 | John Owiti | Kenya | 22.4 | Q |
| 4 | James Odongo Oduka | Uganda | 22.6 | Q |
| 5 | Jacques Dalais | Mauritius | 22.9 | |
| 6 | Alistair Cook | Aden | 23.0 | |
| | Harry Jerome | Canada | | DNS |

=== Heat 2 ===
| Rank | Name | Nationality | Time | Notes |
|---|---|---|---|---|
| 1 | Seraphino Antao | Kenya | 21.7 | Q |
| 2 | Jeffery Smith | Rhodesia and Nyasaland | 21.8 | Q |
| 3 | Michael Cleary | Australia | 21.8 | Q |
| 4 | Ken Peters | Hong Kong | 22.0 | Q |
| 5 | Alf Meakin | England | 22.0 | |
| 6 | Jean Daruty | Mauritius | 22.7 | |
| 7 | Brian Whitehead | Isle of Man | 24.4 | |
| | Yassim Deria | Aden | | DNS |

=== Heat 3 ===
| Rank | Name | Nationality | Time | Notes |
|---|---|---|---|---|
| 1 | Tom Robinson | Bahamas | 21.2 | Q |
| 2 | Peter Radford | England | 21.5 | Q |
| 3 | Peter Norman | Australia | 21.6 | Q |
| 4 | Sitiveni Moceidreke | Fiji | 22.3 | Q |
| 5 | Guy Edmond | Mauritius | 22.5 | |
| 6 | Joseph Lee Gut-Hing | Sarawak | 22.8 | |
| 7 | Ali Abdi Matar | Aden | 24.0 | |

=== Heat 4 ===
| Rank | Name | Nationality | Time | Notes |
|---|---|---|---|---|
| 1 | Mike Hildrey | Scotland | 21.5 | Q |
| 2 | Johan du Preez | Rhodesia and Nyasaland | 21.8 | Q |
| 3 | Bruce Richter | Papua New Guinea | 22.2 | Q |
| 4 | Robert Fisher-Smith | Canada | 22.4 | Q |
| 5 | Christopher Salole | Aden | 23.2 | |
| 6 | Mazlan Hamzah | Malaya | 23.4 | |
| | Dennis Johnson | Jamaica | | DNS |

=== Heat 5 ===
| Rank | Name | Nationality | Time | Notes |
|---|---|---|---|---|
| 1 | Bob Lay | Australia | 21.7 | Q |
| 2 | Lynn Eves | Canada | 22.1 | Q |
| 3 | David England | Wales | 22.1 | Q |
| 4 | Len Carter | England | 22.3 | Q |
| 5 | John Geraldo | Ghana | 22.3 | |
| 6 | William Chai Ah-Lim | Sarawak | 23.7 | |
| | Eustace Gill | British Honduras | | DNS |

=== Heat 6 ===
| Rank | Name | Nationality | Time | Notes |
|---|---|---|---|---|
| 1 | David Jones | England | 21.4 | Q |
| 2 | Edwin Roberts | Trinidad and Tobago | 21.6 | Q |
| 3 | Alistair McIlroy | Scotland | 21.9 | Q |
| 4 | Dennis Tipping | Australia | 22.0 | Q |
| 5 | William Lee | Sarawak | 23.3 | |
| 6 | Anthony Perera | Gibraltar | 23.7 | |
| | Paul Couve | Mauritius | | DNS |

== Round 2 ==
=== Heat 1 ===
| Rank | Name | Nationality | Time | Notes |
|---|---|---|---|---|
| 1 | Seraphino Antao | Kenya | 21.5 | Q |
| 2 | Jeffery Smith | Rhodesia and Nyasaland | 21.9 | Q |
| 3 | Peter Norman | Australia | 22.0 | Q |
| 4 | Len Carter | England | 22.5 | |
| 5 | David England | Wales | 22.5 | |
| 6 | Bruce Richter | Papua New Guinea | 22.6 | |

=== Heat 2 ===
| Rank | Name | Nationality | Time | Notes |
|---|---|---|---|---|
| 1 | Tom Robinson | Bahamas | 21.6 | Q |
| 2 | Bob Lay | Australia | 21.9 | Q |
| 3 | Lynn Eves | Canada | 22.0 | Q |
| 4 | Edwin Roberts | Trinidad and Tobago | 22.2 | |
| 5 | Alistair McIlroy | Scotland | 22.4 | |
| 6 | Nick Whitehead | Wales | 22.5 | |

=== Heat 3 ===
| Rank | Name | Nationality | Time | Notes |
|---|---|---|---|---|
| 1 | David Jones | England | 21.7 | Q |
| 2 | Michael Cleary | Australia | 22.0 | Q |
| 3 | Mike Hildrey | Scotland | 22.1 | Q |
| 4 | John Owiti | Kenya | 22.4 | |
| 5 | Ken Peters | Hong Kong | 22.7 | |
| 6 | Sitiveni Moceidreke | Fiji | 23.2 | |

=== Heat 4 ===
| Rank | Name | Nationality | Time | Notes |
|---|---|---|---|---|
| 1 | Michael Okantey | Ghana | 21.7 | Q |
| 2 | Johan du Preez | Rhodesia and Nyasaland | 21.9 | Q |
| 3 | Peter Radford | England | 21.9 | Q |
| 4 | Dennis Tipping | Australia | 22.3 | |
| 5 | James Odongo Oduka | Uganda | 22.5 | |
| 6 | Robert Fisher-Smith | Canada | 23.0 | |

== Semifinals ==
=== Semifinal 1 ===
| Rank | Name | Nationality | Time | Notes |
|---|---|---|---|---|
| 1 | Seraphino Antao | Kenya | 20.9 | Q, =GR |
| 2 | David Jones | England | 21.4 | Q |
| 3 | Johan du Preez | Rhodesia and Nyasaland | 21.5 | Q |
| 4 | Bob Lay | Australia | 21.6 | |
| 5 | Mike Hildrey | Scotland | 21.7 | |
| 6 | Peter Norman | Australia | 21.8 | |

=== Semifinal 2 ===
| Rank | Name | Nationality | Time | Notes |
|---|---|---|---|---|
| 1 | Michael Cleary | Australia | 21.4 | Q |
| 2 | Michael Okantey | Ghana | 21.5 | Q |
| 3 | Jeffery Smith | Rhodesia and Nyasaland | 21.5 | Q |
| 4 | Tom Robinson | Bahamas | 21.5 | |
| 5 | Peter Radford | England | 21.6 | |
| 6 | Lynn Eves | Canada | 21.7 | |

== Final ==
| Rank | Name | Nationality | Time | Notes |
|---|---|---|---|---|
| 1st place, gold medalist(s) | Seraphino Antao | Kenya | 21.1 | |
| 2nd place, silver medalist(s) | David Jones | England | 21.5 | |
| 3rd place, bronze medalist(s) | Johan du Preez | Rhodesia and Nyasaland | 21.6 | |
| 4 | Michael Okantey | Ghana | 21.9 | |
| 5 | Michael Cleary | Australia | 22.0 | |
| 6 | Jeffery Smith | Rhodesia and Nyasaland | 22.1 | |
