= Athletics at the 1962 British Empire and Commonwealth Games – Men's 100 yards =

Men's 100 yards at the 1962 British Empire and Commonwealth Games
- Venue: Perry Lakes Stadium
- Date: 23 November 1962 (round 1); 24 November 1962 (round 2, semis and final)
- Competitors: 49 from 21 nations
- Winning time: 9.5

Medalists
gold medal	Seraphino Antao	Kenya
silver medal	Tom Robinson	Bahamas
bronze medal	Michael Cleary	Australia

The men's 100 yards at the 1962 British Empire and Commonwealth Games as part of the athletics programme was held at the Perry Lakes Stadium on Friday 23 November and Saturday 24 November 1962.

The top four runners in each of the initial nine heats qualified for the second round. Those 36 runners competed in six heats in the second round, with the top two runners from each heat qualifying for the semifinals. There were two semifinals, and only the top three from each heat advanced to the final.

The event was won by Kenyan Seraphino Antao in 9.5 seconds, with the world record holder and favourite Canadian Harry Jerome finishing last, severely injured, in the final.

== Records ==
World record	Frank Budd (USA); Harry Jerome (CAN)	9.2	New York City, United States; Vancouver, Canada	1 July 1961; 25 August 1962
Commonwealth record				
Games record	Keith Gardner (JAM)	9.4	Cardiff, Wales	20 July 1958

== Round 1 ==
=== Heat 1 ===
Rank	Name	Nationality	Time	Notes
1	Harry Jerome	Canada	9.4	Q
2	Alistair McIlroy	Scotland	9.5	Q
3	Bob Lay	Australia	9.6	Q
4	Bruce Richter	Papua New Guinea	10.1	Q
5	Eustace Gill	British Honduras	10.2	
6	Alistair Cook	Aden	10.3	

=== Heat 2 ===
Rank	Name	Nationality	Time	Notes
1	Seraphino Antao	Kenya	9.4	Q
2	Gary Holdsworth	Australia	9.5	Q
3	Alf Meakin	England	9.7	Q
4	William Chai Ah-Lim	Sarawak	10.3	Q
5	Yassim Deria	Aden	10.8	
6	Brian Whitehead	Isle of Man	11.0	

=== Heat 3 ===
Rank	Name	Nationality	Time	Notes
1	Dennis Johnson	Jamaica	9.6	Q
2	John Owiti	Kenya	9.8	Q
3	Sitiveni Moceidreke	Fiji	10.0	Q
4	William Lee	Sarawak	10.4	Q
5	Ali Abdi Matar	Aden	10.8	
	Paul Couve	Mauritius		DNS

=== Heat 4 ===
Rank	Name	Nationality	Time	Notes
1	Tom Robinson	Bahamas	9.4	Q
2	Berwyn Jones	Wales	9.6	Q
3	Johan du Preez	Rhodesia and Nyasaland	9.8	Q
4	Joseph Lee Gut-Hing	Sarawak	10.0	Q
5	Jacques Dalais	Mauritius	10.2	
6	Michael Shaw	Aden	10.3	

=== Heat 5 ===
Rank	Name	Nationality	Time	Notes
1	David Jones	England	9.6	Q
2	Bukari Bashiru	Ghana	9.8	Q
3	Lynn Eves	Canada	9.9	Q
4	Jean Daruty	Mauritius	10.2	Q
5	Mazlan Hamzah	Malaya	10.5	

=== Heat 6 ===
Rank	Name	Nationality	Time	Notes
1	Michael Ahey	Ghana	9.7	Q
2	Byron Williams	Australia	9.8	Q
3	Nick Whitehead	Wales	9.9	Q
4	Robert Fisher-Smith	Canada	10.0	Q
5	Guy Edmond	Mauritius	10.1	

=== Heat 7 ===
Rank	Name	Nationality	Time	Notes
1	Michael Cleary	Australia	9.4	Q
2	Michael Okantey	Ghana	9.7	Q
3	Mike Hildrey	Scotland	9.7	Q
4	Lynn Davies	Wales	9.9	Q
5	Allen Crawley	Papua New Guinea	10.0	

=== Heat 8 ===
Rank	Name	Nationality	Time	Notes
1	Edwin Roberts	Trinidad and Tobago	9.6	Q
2	Peter Radford	England	9.7	Q
3	Jeffery Smith	Rhodesia and Nyasaland	9.9	Q
4	James Odongo Oduka	Uganda	9.9	Q
5	Leana Gari	Papua New Guinea	10.3	

=== Heat 9 ===
Rank	Name	Nationality	Time	Notes
1	Ron Jones	Wales	9.6	Q
2	Bonner Mends	Ghana	9.7	Q
3	Len Carter	England	10.0	Q
4	Misiloarim Labert	Papua New Guinea	10.3	Q
5	Anthony Perera	Gibraltar	10.4	

== Round 2 ==
=== Heat 1 ===
Rank	Name	Nationality	Time	Notes
1	Harry Jerome	Canada	9.6	Q
2	Peter Radford	England	9.8	Q
3	Bonner Mends	Ghana	9.9	
4	Lynn Davies	Wales	10.2	
5	James Odongo Oduka	Uganda	10.3	
6	Misiloarim Labert	Papua New Guinea	10.5	

=== Heat 2 ===
Rank	Name	Nationality	Time	Notes
1	Seraphino Antao	Kenya	9.6	Q
2	Ron Jones	Wales	9.8	Q
3	Bob Lay	Australia	9.8	
4	Jeffery Smith	Rhodesia and Nyasaland	10.0	
5	Lynn Eves	Canada	10.2	
6	William Chai Ah-Lim	Sarawak	10.5	

=== Heat 3 ===
Rank	Name	Nationality	Time	Notes
1	Tom Robinson	Bahamas	9.6	Q
2	Michael Okantey	Ghana	9.8	Q
3	Edwin Roberts	Trinidad and Tobago	10.0	
4	Nick Whitehead	Wales	10.1	
5	Byron Williams	Australia	10.2	
6	Sitiveni Moceidreke	Fiji	10.2	

=== Heat 4 ===
Rank	Name	Nationality	Time	Notes
1	Michael Cleary	Australia	9.6	Q
2	Berwyn Jones	Wales	9.8	Q
3	Bukari Bashiru	Ghana	9.9	
4	Mike Hildrey	Scotland	10.1	
5	Len Carter	England	10.2	
6	William Lee	Sarawak	10.7	

=== Heat 5 ===
Rank	Name	Nationality	Time	Notes
1	Dennis Johnson	Jamaica	9.8	Q
2	Alistair McIlroy	Scotland	9.9	Q
3	Alf Meakin	England	9.9	
4	Johan du Preez	Rhodesia and Nyasaland	10.1	
5	Robert Fisher-Smith	Canada	10.3	
6	Jean Daruty	Mauritius	10.4	

=== Heat 6 ===
Rank	Name	Nationality	Time	Notes
1	Gary Holdsworth	Australia	9.7	Q
2	Michael Ahey	Ghana	9.9	Q
3	David Jones	England	9.9	
4	John Owiti	Kenya	10.2	
5	Joseph Lee Gut-Hing	Sarawak	10.5	
6	Bruce Richter	Papua New Guinea	10.5	

== Semifinals ==
=== Semifinal 1 ===
Rank	Name	Nationality	Time	Notes
1	Harry Jerome	Canada	9.5	Q
2	Tom Robinson	Bahamas	9.5	Q
3	Gary Holdsworth	Australia	9.7	Q
4	Michael Okantey	Ghana	9.7	
5	Ron Jones	Wales	9.8	
6	Alistair McIlroy	Scotland	9.9	

=== Semifinal 2 ===
Rank	Name	Nationality	Time	Notes
1	Seraphino Antao	Kenya	9.5	Q
2	Michael Cleary	Australia	9.7	Q
3	Dennis Johnson	Jamaica	9.7	Q
4	Michael Ahey	Ghana	9.8	
5	Peter Radford	England	9.8	
6	Berwyn Jones	Wales	9.9	

== Final ==
Wind -1.8 m/s

Rank	Name	Nationality	Time	Notes
1st place, gold medalist(s)	Seraphino Antao	Kenya	9.5	9.50
2nd place, silver medalist(s)	Tom Robinson	Bahamas	9.6	9.63
3rd place, bronze medalist(s)	Michael Cleary	Australia	9.6	9.78
4	Gary Holdsworth	Australia	9.7	
5	Dennis Johnson	Jamaica	9.9	
6	Harry Jerome	Canada	10.0	inj.
