= Athletics at the 1962 British Empire and Commonwealth Games – Men's 4 × 110 yards relay =

Commonwealth Games

Men's 4 × 110 yards relay at the 1962 British Empire and Commonwealth Games
- Venue: Perry Lakes Stadium
- Date: 1 December 1962
- Teams: 9
- Winning time: 40.6 GR

Medalists
| gold medal | Peter Radford; Len Carter; Alf Meakin; David Jones | England |
| silver medal | Michael Ahey; Bonner Mends; Bukari Bashiru; Michael Okantey | Ghana |
| bronze medal | David England; Ron Jones; Berwyn Jones; Nick Whitehead | Wales |

The men's 4 × 110 yards relay at the 1962 British Empire and Commonwealth Games, part of the athletics programme, was held at the Perry Lakes Stadium on Saturday 1 December 1962.

Nine nations competed in two heats in the first round, with the top three from each heat qualifying for the final.

The event was won English team of Peter Radford, Len Carter, Alf Meakin and David Jones. They finished ahead of Ghanaian team of Michael Ahey, Bonner Mends, Bukari Bashiru and Michael Okantey and the Welsh quartet of David England, Ron Jones, Berwyn Jones and Nick Whitehead who won bronze. The winning time of 40.6 seconds was posted by both England and Ghana, with both team setting a new games record. The time also equalled the British record.

During the first change between Bob Lay and Dennis Tipping, the baton was dropped and Australians failed to recover, crossing the line in last place. The Sarawak team, who had originally finished 5th in 43.9 seconds were later disqualified.

== Records ==
| World record | The University of Texas (Wally Wilson, Eddie Southern, Hollis Gainey, Ralph Alspaugh) | 39.6 | Modesto, California, United States | 30 May 1959 |
| Commonwealth record | | | | |
| Games record | England (Peter Radford, Roy Sandstrom, David Segal, Adrian Breacker) | 40.7 | Cardiff, Wales | 27 July 1958 |

== Round 1 ==
=== Heat 1 ===
| Rank | Nation | Competitors | Time | Notes |
|---|---|---|---|---|
| 1 | Australia | Bob Lay, Dennis Tipping, Gary Holdsworth, Michael Cleary | 41.2 | Q |
| 2 | Wales | David England, Ron Jones, Berwyn Jones, Nick Whitehead | 41.4 | Q |
| 3 | Rhodesia and Nyasaland | Roy Collins, Jeffery Smith, Danie Burger, Johan du Preez | 42.6 | Q |
| 4 | Mauritius | Paul Couve, Jean Daruty, Guy Edmond, Jacques Dalais | 43.2 | |
| 5 | Papua New Guinea | Leana Gari, Misiloarim Labert, Bruce Richter, Allen Crawley | 43.6 | |

=== Heat 2 ===
| Rank | Nation | Competitors | Time | Notes |
|---|---|---|---|---|
| 1 | England | Peter Radford, Len Carter, Alf Meakin, David Jones | 41.0 | Q |
| 2 | Ghana | Michael Ahey, Bonner Mends, Bukari Bashiru, Michael Okantey | 41.3 | Q |
| 3 | Sarawak | William Lee, Kuda Ditta, Joseph Lee Gut-Hing, William Chai Ah-Lim | 43.8 | Q |
| 4 | Aden | Ali Abdi Matar, Alistair Cook, Christopher Salole, Michael Shaw | 43.8 | |

== Final ==
| Rank | Nation | Competitors | Time | Notes |
|---|---|---|---|---|
| 1st place, gold medalist(s) | England | Peter Radford, Len Carter, Alf Meakin, David Jones | 40.6 | GR, =BR |
| 2nd place, silver medalist(s) | Ghana | Michael Ahey, Bonner Mends, Bukari Bashiru, Michael Okantey | 40.6 | GR |
| 3rd place, bronze medalist(s) | Wales | David England, Ron Jones, Berwyn Jones, Nick Whitehead | 40.8 | |
| 4 | Rhodesia and Nyasaland | Roy Collins, Jeffery Smith, Danie Burger, Johan du Preez | 42.7 | |
| 5 | Australia | Bob Lay, Dennis Tipping, Gary Holdsworth, Michael Cleary | 44.7 | |
| | Sarawak | William Lee, Kuda Ditta, Joseph Lee Gut-Hing, William Chai Ah-Lim | | DSQ |
