= Athletics at the 1962 British Empire and Commonwealth Games – Men's 1 mile =

Men's 1 mile at the 1962 British Empire and Commonwealth Games
- Venue: Perry Lakes Stadium
- Date: 29 November 1962 (round 1); 1 December 1962 (final)
- Competitors: 32 from 15 nations
- Winning time: 4:04.6

Medalists
gold medal	Peter Snell	New Zealand
silver medal	John Davies	New Zealand
bronze medal	Terry Sullivan	Rhodesia and Nyasaland

Official video

The men's 1 mile at the 1962 British Empire and Commonwealth Games as part of the athletics programme was held at the Perry Lakes Stadium on Thursday 29 November and Saturday 1 December 1962.

32 runners competed in three heats in the first round, with the top three runners from each heat qualifying for the final.

The event was won by the world recorder holder and winner of the 880 yards event, New Zealander Peter Snell in 4:04.6. Snell finished 0.5 seconds ahead of his fellow countryman John Davies and Terry Sullivan representing the Federation of Rhodesia and Nyasaland.

== Records ==
World record	Peter Snell (NZL)	3:54.4	Whanganui, New Zealand	27 January 1962
Commonwealth record				
Games record	Roger Bannister (ENG)	3:58.8	Vancouver, British Columbia, Canada	7 August 1954

== Heats ==
=== Heat 1 ===
Rank	Name	Nationality	Time	Notes
1	Albie Thomas	Australia	4:02.2	Q
2	Peter Snell	New Zealand	4:02.4	Q
3	Bruce Tulloh	England	4:02.5	Q
4	Alan Simpson	England	4:03.0	
5	Kipchoge Keino	Kenya	4:07.0	
6	Anar Khan	Pakistan	4:15.9	
7	Don Bertoia	Canada	4:19.0	
8	Jacob Ndhlovu	Rhodesia and Nyasaland	4:19.8	
9	David Griffiths	Aden	4:23.5	
10	Dilbagh Singh Kler	British North Borneo	4:26.0	

=== Heat 2 ===
Rank	Name	Nationality	Time	Notes
1	Terry Sullivan	Rhodesia and Nyasaland	4:06.6	Q
2	John Davies	New Zealand	4:06.7	Q
3	Stan Taylor	England	4:08.7	Q
4	Pat Clohessy	Australia	4:11.0	
5	Peter Francis	Kenya	4:11.0	
6	Robert Rwakojo	Uganda	4:11.1	
7	Colin McLachlan	Isle of Man	4:29.2	
8	Ramasamy Subramaniam	Malaya	4:31.2	
9	Daria Mohammed	Aden	4:33.9	
10	Abdul Wahab Mohamed Salleh	Sarawak	4:48.4	
	Bruce Kidd	Canada		DNS

=== Heat 3 ===
Rank	Name	Nationality	Time	Notes
1	Tony Blue	Australia	4:09.3	Q
2	Tony Harris	Wales	4:09.9	Q
3	Jim Irons	Canada	4:10.8	Q
4	Gordon Noble	Australia	4:11.3	
5	Mike Berisford	Scotland	4:13.0	
6	Stephen Chelimo	Kenya	4:16.8	
7	Hylke van der Wal	Canada	4:18.6	
8	Brian Hall	England	4:18.9	
	Cyril Cure	Mauritius		DNF
	Bill Baillie	New Zealand		DNS
	Said Adeeb	Aden		DNS

== Final ==
Rank	Name	Nationality	Time	Notes
1st place, gold medalist(s)	Peter Snell	New Zealand	4:04.6	
2nd place, silver medalist(s)	John Davies	New Zealand	4:05.1	
3rd place, bronze medalist(s)	Terry Sullivan	Rhodesia and Nyasaland	4:06.6	
4	Tony Blue	Australia	4:09.4	
5	Albie Thomas	Australia	4:11.2	
6	Tony Harris	Wales	4:11.8	
7	Stan Taylor	England	4:12.7	
8	Jim Irons	Canada	4:17.4	
9	Bruce Tulloh	England	4:22.1	
