= Ray Batchelor =

English football manager

Personal information
- Full name: Raymond Harold Walter Batchelor
- Date of birth: 1924
- Date of death: 2006 (aged 81–82)

Managerial career
- Years: Team
- 1961: Kenya
- 1963: Nakuru AllStars
- 1967–1971: Malawi
- 1970s: Copper Stars

Raymond Harold Walter Batchelor (1924–2006), often misspelt Bachelor, was an English athletics and football coach and administrator who was active in Kenya, Malawi, and Zimbabwe. He is known for being the first ever manager of the Kenya national football team.

== Early life ==
Raymond Harold Walter Batchelor was born in 1924 and registered in the September–December quarter of the GRO indexes in West Ham.

Over the years, his name was often misspelt Bachelor in the media.

== Career ==
=== Kenya ===
Batchelor coached both athletics and football in Kenya and other African countries.

==== Kenyan athletics ====
During the 1950s Batchelor founded the Achilles Athletics Club in Mombasa, Kenya, where many Goan athletes trained, including sprinter Seraphino Antao, Albert Castanha, Joe Faria, Pascoal Antao, Alcino Rodrigues, Jack Fernandes, Laura Ramos, Phila Fernandes, Juanita Noronha, Meldrita Viegas, Alfred Vienna, and Bruno D'Souza.

Batchelor is especially known in Kenya and among Goans for his role in coaching Antao to the 1962 Commonwealth Games in Perth, Australia, to his win when he won 100 and 220 yards gold medals, making him the first Kenyan athlete to win a gold medal at an international level.

When Kenya was still a British colony, Batchelor was employed as a sports officer by the Coast Province administration.

==== Kenyan football ====
In 1961 he was appointed the first ever manager of the Kenya national football team. He was their manager when they played at the Uganda Independence Tournament in 1962, after Kenya was invited to replace Egypt in the competition. Peter Oronge (a former Kenyan international player) was appointed coach in 1963, not longer after Kenyan independence was declared.

On Saturday 11 December 1965, as part of the Jamhuri Day celebrations marking Kenyan independence, Batchelor was called in as an emergency coach after the team had just been inexplicably deserted by Oronge just a few hours before the game. The team suffered a 13–2 loss to Ghana's Black Stars at the game, which was attended by president Jomo Kenyatta. At the time, Batchelor was the Rift Valley Province sports officer, and also coaching the Nakuru AllStars. After being contacted by the Kenyan Football Association, Batchelor was able to spend just four hours with the team before kickoff, and the Ghanaians were a very strong team with a dangerous striker in the form of Ben Acheampong. Two days later, after Batchelor had reorganised the team, the Kenyans and Ghanaians drew in a friendly match.

He later managed Kenyan club side Nakuru AllStars, first ever winners of the Kenyan Premier League. in 1964.

=== Malawi ===
From 11 November 1967 to 10 October 1971, Batchelor coached the Malawi national football team.

In 1968, he was Director of Department of Sports in Malawi. In this role, he announced that Malawi had applied to participate in the 1968 Olympic Games in Mexico, most African nations threatening to boycott the games because of South Africa's participation, owing to the apartheid regime.

=== Rhodesia/Zimbabwe ===
In the 1970s, Batchelor acted as an athletics coach in the copper mining town of Mangula (now Mhangura) in then Rhodesia (now Zimbabwe). He coached, among others, sprinter Artwell Mandaza.

He was also football coach for the "Copper Stars", the local Mangula football team, and coached Black Aces FC star Byron Manuel at some point.

== Other activities and personal life ==
Batchelor acted as a presiding officer in the Mombasa polling booths in elections held by the British in 1956.

Batchelor was described in a 2012 Daily Nation article as "one of those White people who believed in the African cause and had thrown his lot in with black Kenyans full-bloodedly", and "always wore a cheerful smile".

== Death ==
Batchelor died in 2006.
