= Athletics at the 1962 British Empire and Commonwealth Games – Men's 880 yards =

Men's 880 yards at the 1962 British Empire and Commonwealth Games
- Venue: Perry Lakes Stadium
- Date: 24 November 1962 (round 1 and semis); 26 November 1962 (final)
- Competitors: 32 from 17 nations
- Winning time: 1:47.6 GR

Medalists
gold medal	Peter Snell	New Zealand
silver medal	George Kerr	Jamaica
bronze medal	Tony Blue	Australia

Official video

The men's 880 yards at the 1962 British Empire and Commonwealth Games as part of the athletics programme was held at the Perry Lakes Stadium on Saturday 24 November 1962 and Monday 26 November.

The top two runners in each of the six heats qualified for the semifinals. There were two semifinals, and only the top three from each heat advanced to the final.

The event was won by the world recorder holder and the 800 metres Olympic champion, New Zealander Peter Snell in 1:47.6 seconds, setting a new Games record time. Snell won by 0.2 seconds ahead of the Olympic bronze medallist, Jamaican George Kerr and Tony Blue of Australia who won the bronze.

== Records ==
World record	Peter Snell (NZL)	1:45.1	Christchurch, New Zealand	3 February 1962
Commonwealth record				
Games record	Herb Elliott (AUS)	1:49.3	Cardiff, Wales	22 July 1958

The following records were established during the competition:

Date	Event	Name	Nationality	Time	Record
26 November	Final	Peter Snell	New Zealand	1:47.6	GR

== Heats ==
=== Heat 1 ===
Rank	Name	Nationality	Time	Notes
1	Peter Snell	New Zealand	1:50.7	Q
2	Sid Purkis	England	1:50.9	Q
3	Kiptalam Keter	Kenya	1:51.4	
4	David Griffiths	Aden	1:54.8	
5	Abdul Wahab Mohamed Salleh	Sarawak	2:04.9	
6	Hylke van der Wal	Canada		DNS

=== Heat 2 ===
Rank	Name	Nationality	Time	Notes
1	John Wenk	Scotland	1:51.2	Q
2	Mike Fleet	England	1:51.5	Q
3	Gary Philpott	New Zealand	1:52.6	
4	Stephen Chelimo	Kenya	1:54.2	
5	Daria Mohammed	Aden	2:01.6	
6	Frederick Owusu	Ghana		DNS

=== Heat 3 ===
Rank	Name	Nationality	Time	Notes
1	Peter Francis	Kenya	1:50.6	Q
2	Tony Harris	Wales	1:51.3	Q
3	Robert Setti	England	1:52.2	
4	Patrick Field	Hong Kong	1:57.6	
5	Eustace Gill	British Honduras	2:08.0	

=== Heat 4 ===
Rank	Name	Nationality	Time	Notes
1	John Davies	New Zealand	1:51.1	Q
2	George Kerr	Jamaica	1:51.3	Q
3	Stan Taylor	England	1:52.4	
4	Ramasamy Subramaniam	Malaya	1:59.9	
5	Colin McLachlan	Isle of Man	2:00.0	

=== Heat 5 ===
Rank	Name	Nationality	Time	Notes
1	Terry Sullivan	Rhodesia and Nyasaland	1:52.7	Q
2	Keith Wheeler	Australia	1:52.8	Q
3	Don Bertoia	Canada	1:53.3	
4	Cyril Cure	Mauritius	1:58.6	
5	Peter Harraghy	Isle of Man	2:02.8	

=== Heat 6 ===
Rank	Name	Nationality	Time	Notes
1	Bill Crothers	Canada	1:51.4	Q
2	Tony Blue	Australia	1:52.0	Q
3	Mel Spence	Jamaica	1:52.3	
4	Jacob Ndhlovu	Rhodesia and Nyasaland	1:54.3	
5	Mohamed Abdul Rahiman	Malaya	1:59.7	

== Semifinals ==
=== Semifinal 1 ===
Rank	Name	Nationality	Time	Notes
1	George Kerr	Jamaica	1:50.4	Q
2	Tony Blue	Australia	1:50.7	Q
3	Peter Francis	Kenya	1:51.0	Q
4	John Davies	New Zealand	1:51.5	
5	Terry Sullivan	Rhodesia and Nyasaland	1:51.7	
6	Sid Purkis	England	1:54.1	

=== Semifinal 2 ===
Rank	Name	Nationality	Time	Notes
1	Peter Snell	New Zealand	1:50.5	Q
2	Tony Harris	Wales	1:51.2	Q
3	Mike Fleet	England	1:51.2	Q
4	Keith Wheeler	Australia	1:51.3	
5	Bill Crothers	Canada	1:52.3	
6	John Wenk	Scotland	1:52.3	

== Final ==
Rank	Lane	Name	Nationality	Time	Notes
1st place, gold medalist(s)	6	Peter Snell	New Zealand	1:47.6	GR
2nd place, silver medalist(s)	4	George Kerr	Jamaica	1:47.8	
3rd place, bronze medalist(s)	3	Tony Blue	Australia	1:49.0	
4	1	Peter Francis	Kenya	1:49.9	
5	2	Mike Fleet	England	1:50.0	
6	5	Tony Harris	Wales	1:52.3	
