= Athletics at the 1962 British Empire and Commonwealth Games – Men's 440 yards =

Men's 440 yards at the 1962 British Empire and Commonwealth Games
- Venue: Perry Lakes Stadium
- Date: 26 November 1962 (rounds 1); 29 November 1962 (semis and final)
- Competitors: 33 from 15 nations
- Winning time: 46.7 s

Medalists
gold medal	George Kerr	Jamaica
silver medal	Robbie Brightwell	England
bronze medal	Amos Omolo	Uganda

The men's 440 yards at the 1962 British Empire and Commonwealth Games as part of the athletics programme was held at the Perry Lakes Stadium on Monday 26 November and Thursday 29 November 1962.

33 runners competed in six heats in the initial round, with the top two runners from each heat qualifying for the semifinals. There were two semifinals, and only the top three from each heat advanced to the final.

The event was won by Jamaica George Kerr in 46.7 seconds, who also won silver 880 yards earlier in the meet. Kerr finished 0.1 seconds ahead of Englishman Robbie Brightwell and Amos Omolo from Uganda who won bronze. Kerr's winning time in the final set a new Australian all comers record. One of England's finalist hopes Barry Jackson suffered a muscle injury 15 yards from the finish in the second semi final and unable to complete the race.

== Records ==
World record	Glenn Davis (USA)	45.7	Berkeley, California, United States	14 June 1958
Commonwealth record				
Games record	Milkha Singh (IND)	46.6	Cardiff, Wales	24 July 1958

== Round 1 ==
=== Heat 1 ===
Rank	Name	Nationality	Time	Notes
1	Robbie Brightwell	England	47.5	Q
2	Bill Crothers	Canada	48.4	Q
3	Peter Quiggan	Australia	49.4	
4	Eustace Gill	British Honduras	50.5	
5	John Kaputin	Papua New Guinea	51.4	
6	Arap Kiptalam Keter	Kenya	52.3	

=== Heat 2 ===
Rank	Name	Nationality	Time	Notes
1	George Kerr	Jamaica	47.5	Q
2	Brian Waters	Australia	47.9	Q
3	Nick Overhead	England	48.4	
4	Karu Selvaratnam	Malaya	50.3	
5	Damian Midi	Papua New Guinea	52.9	
6	Nasser Ahmed	Aden	56.3	

=== Heat 3 ===
Rank	Name	Nationality	Time	Notes
1	Amos Omolo	Uganda	47.1	Q
2	James Addy	Ghana	47.8	Q
3	Adrian Metcalfe	England	48.3	
4	John Randall	Australia	48.7	
5	Wilson Kiprugut	Kenya	49.0	
6	Ken Peters	Hong Kong	49.0	

=== Heat 4 ===
Rank	Name	Nationality	Time	Notes
1	Malcolm Spence	Jamaica	47.0	Q
2	Barry Jackson	England	47.5	Q
3	Gadi Ado	Uganda	48.5	
4	Victor Asirvatham	Malaya	49.4	
	William Chai Ah-Lim	Sarawak		DNS

=== Heat 5 ===
Rank	Name	Nationality	Time	Notes
1	Kimaru Songok	Kenya	47.6	Q
2	Mel Spence	Jamaica	47.9	Q
3	Ebenezer Quartey	Ghana	48.4	
4	Peter Harraghy	Isle of Man	56.1	
	William Lee	Sarawak		DNS

=== Heat 6 ===
Rank	Name	Nationality	Time	Notes
1	Ken Roche	Australia	48.4	Q
2	Barry Robinson	New Zealand	48.6	Q
3	Laurie Khan	Jamaica	48.8	
4	Brobbey Mensah	Ghana	49.2	
5	Mohamed Abdul Rahiman	Malaya	51.2	

== Semifinals ==
=== Semifinal 1 ===
.

Rank	Name	Nationality	Time	Notes
1	Robbie Brightwell	England	47.4	Q
2	Malcolm Spence	Jamaica	47.8	Q
3	Ken Roche	Australia	47.9	Q
4	Kimaru Songok	Kenya	48.5	
5	James Addy	Ghana	48.6	
6	Barry Robinson	New Zealand	49.4	

=== Semifinal 2 ===
Rank	Name	Nationality	Time	Notes
1	George Kerr	Jamaica	46.9	Q
2	Amos Omolo	Uganda	46.9	Q
3	Mel Spence	Jamaica	47.2	Q
4	Brian Waters	Australia	47.8	
5	Bill Crothers	Canada	48.2	
	Barry Jackson	England		DNF

== Final ==
Rank	Name	Nationality	Time	Notes
1st place, gold medalist(s)	George Kerr	Jamaica	46.7	ACR
2nd place, silver medalist(s)	Robbie Brightwell	England	46.8	
3rd place, bronze medalist(s)	Amos Omolo	Uganda	46.8	
4	Ken Roche	Australia	47.7	
5	Malcolm Spence	Jamaica	47.7	
6	Mel Spence	Jamaica	47.8	
