= Kenya at the 1962 British Empire and Commonwealth Games =

- CG code: KEN
- CGA: National Olympic Committee of Kenya

in Perth, Western Australia
- Flag bearers: Opening: Closing:
- Medals Ranked 9thth: Gold 2 Silver 2 Bronze 1 Total 5

British Empire and Commonwealth Games appearances
- 1954; 1958; 1962; 1966; 1970; 1974; 1978; 1982; 1986; 1990; 1994; 1998; 2002; 2006; 2010; 2014; 2018; 2022; 2026; 2030

The Colony and Protectorate of Kenya competed at the 1962 British Empire and Commonwealth Games in Perth, Western Australia, from 22 November to 1 December 1962.

== Medalists ==
Medal	Name	Sport	Event	Date
Gold	Seraphino Antao	Athletics	Men's 100 yards	24 November
Gold	Seraphino Antao	Athletics	Men's 220 yards	29 November
Silver	Kimaru Songok	Athletics	Men's 440 yards hurdles	26 November

== Athletics ==
Men
Track events

Athlete	Event	Round 1		Round 2		Semifinal		Final	
Athlete	Event	Result	Rank	Result	Rank	Result	Rank	Result	Rank
Seraphino Antao	100 yd	9.4	1 Q	9.6	1 Q	9.5	1 Q	9.5	1st place, gold medalist(s)
John Owiti	100 yd	9.8	2 Q	10.2	4	did not advance			
Seraphino Antao	220 yd	21.7	1 Q	21.5	1 Q	20.9	1 Q =GR	21.1	1st place, gold medalist(s)
John Owiti	220 yd	22.4	3 Q	22.4	4	did not advance			
Arap Kiptalam Keter	440 yd	52.3	6	—N/a		did not advance			
Wilson Kiprugut	440 yd	49.0	5	—N/a		did not advance			
Kimaru Songok	440 yd	47.6	1 Q	—N/a		48.5	4	did not advance	
Stephen Chelimo	880 yd	1:54.2	4	—N/a		did not advance			
Peter Francis	880 yd	1:50.6	1 Q	—N/a		1:51.0	3 Q	1:49.9	4
Arap Kiptalam Keter	880 yd	1:51.4	3	—N/a		did not advance			
Stephen Chelimo	1 mile	4:16.8	6	—N/a				did not advance	
Peter Francis	1 mile	4:11.0	5	—N/a				did not advance	
Kipchoge Keino	1 mile	4:07.0	5	—N/a				did not advance	
Arere Anentia	3 miles	—N/a						13:47.0	10
Kipchoge Keino	3 miles	—N/a						13:50.0	11
Anthony Ngatia	3 miles	—N/a						14:33.0	13
Arere Anentia	6 miles	—N/a						29:07.0	7
James Wahome	6 miles	—N/a						30:04.0	11
Kimaru Songok	440 yd hurdles	52.6	3 Q	—N/a				51.9	2nd place, silver medalist(s)
Seraphino Antao; Peter Francis; Wilson Kiprugut; Kimaru Songok	4×440 yd relay	3:18.9	3 Q	—N/a				3:16.0	5

Field events

Athlete	Event	Final	
Athlete	Event	Distance	Rank
Joseph Leresae	High jump	6 ft 8 in (2.03 m)	5
Paul Odhiambo	Long jump	24 ft 4 in (7.42 m)	7
Paul Odhiambo	Triple jump	48 ft 11 1/2 in (14.92 m)	7

== See also ==
- Kenya at the 1960 Summer Olympics
- Kenya at the 1964 Summer Olympics
