= Scotland at the 1962 British Empire and Commonwealth Games =

- CG code: SCO
- CGA: Commonwealth Games Scotland
- Website: www.teamscotland.scot

in Perth, Western Australia
- Flag bearers: Opening: Closing:
- Medals Ranked 6th: Gold 4 Silver 7 Bronze 3 Total 14

British Empire and Commonwealth Games appearances
- 1930; 1934; 1938; 1950; 1954; 1958; 1962; 1966; 1970; 1974; 1978; 1982; 1986; 1990; 1994; 1998; 2002; 2006; 2010; 2014; 2018; 2022; 2026; 2030

Scotland competed at the 1962 British Empire and Commonwealth Games in Perth, Western Australia, from 22 November to 1 December 1962.

Scotland sent a team of 35 athletes and 5 officials at the cost of £16,000.

== Medalists ==
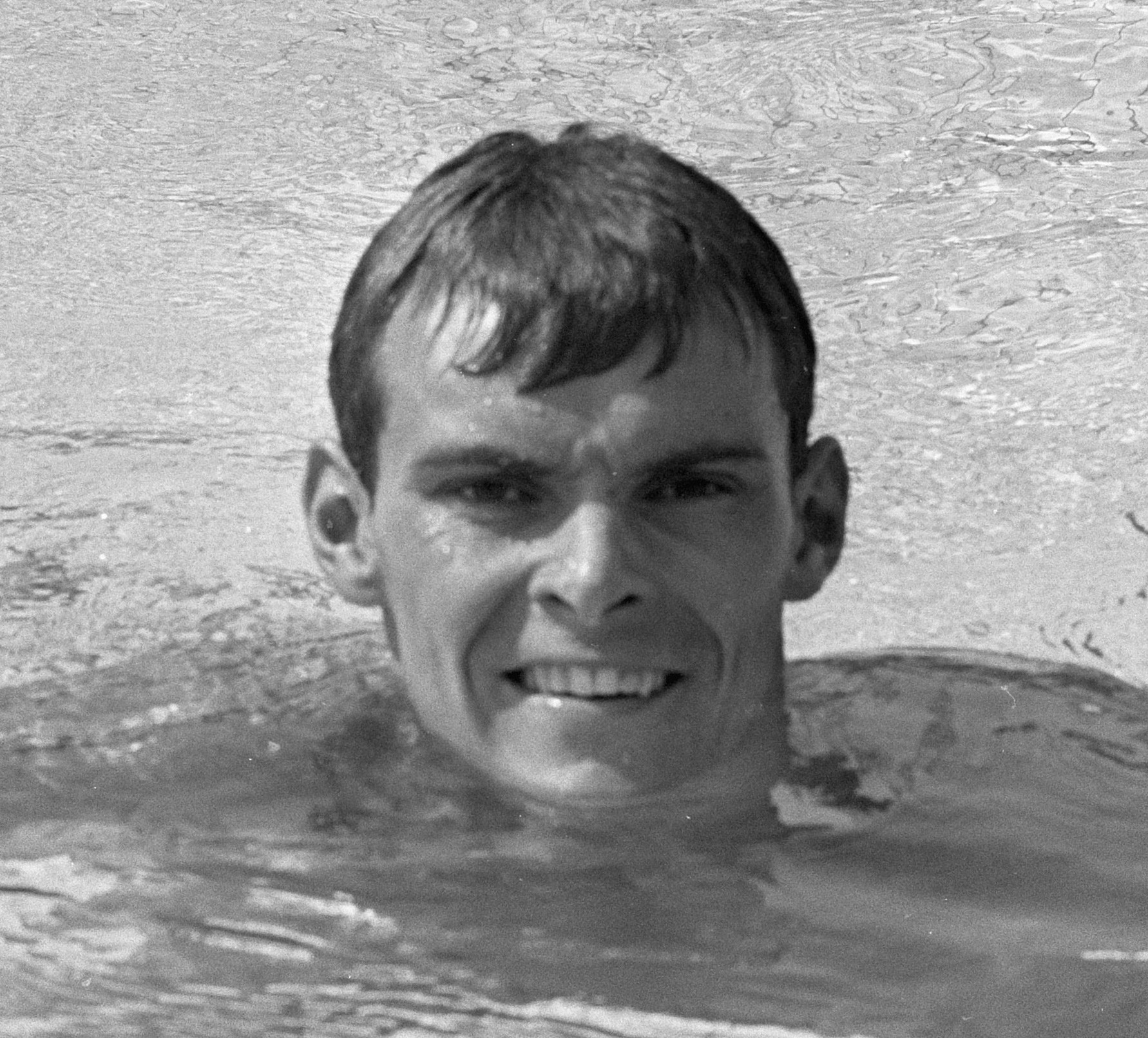
Bob McGregor won a silver medal in the 110 yards freestyle event

=== Gold ===
- Phil Caira (weightlifting)
- Sandy Leckie (fencing)
- Bobby Mallon (boxing)
- John McDermott (boxing)

=== Silver ===
- Joseph Black (lawn bowls)
- Mike Lindsay (shot put)
- Mike Lindsay (discus throw)
- Bob McGregor (swimming)
- Dick McTaggart (boxing)
- men's pairs (lawn bowls)
- men's fours/rinks (lawn bowls)

=== Bronze ===
- Tom Menzies (boxing)
- Jimmy Moir (weightlifting)
- Jim Turnbull (wrestling)

== Officials ==
- Willie C. Carmichael - General team manager
- Peter Heatly - official
- J. W. Williamson - official
- John Henderson - ABA secretary
- G. Shaw - Boxing trainer
- Crawford Fairbrother - team captain

== Team ==
=== Athletics ===
Men

Athlete	Club
Mike Berisford	Sale Harriers
Crawford Fairbrother	Victoria Park AAC
Mike Hildrey	Victoria Park AAC
Mike Lindsay	Queens Park Harriers
Alistair McIlroy	Thurrock Harriers
Dave Stevenson	Edinburgh University
John Wenk	Anglo-Scottish AAC
Alastair Wood	Aberdeen AAC

Women

Athlete	Club
Janette Neil	Mitcham AC

Men
Track & road events

Athlete	Event	Round 1		Round 2		Semifinal		Final	
Athlete	Event	Result	Rank	Result	Rank	Result	Rank	Result	Rank
Mike Hildrey	100 yd	9.7	3 Q	10.1	4	did not advance			
Alistair McIlroy	100 yd	9.5	2 Q	9.9	2 Q	9.9	6	did not advance	
Mike Hildrey	220 yd	21.5	1 Q	22.1	3 Q	21.7	5	did not advance	
Alistair McIlroy	220 yd	21.9	3 Q	22.4	5	did not advance			
John Wenk	880 yd	1:51.2	1 Q	—N/a		1:52.3	6	did not advance	
Mike Berisford	1 mile	4:13.0	5	—N/a				did not advance	
Alastair Wood	Marathon	—N/a						DNF	

Field events

Athlete	Event	Final	
Athlete	Event	Distance	Rank
Crawford Fairbrother	High jump	6 ft 6 in (1.98 m)	8
Dave Stevenson	Pole vault	13 ft 0 in (3.96 m)	10
Mike Lindsay	Shot put	59 ft 2 1/2 in (18.05 m)	2nd place, silver medalist(s)
Mike Lindsay	Discus throw	172 ft 6 in (52.58 m)	2nd place, silver medalist(s)

Women
Track events

Athlete	Event	Round 1		Semifinal		Final	
Athlete	Event	Result	Rank	Result	Rank	Result	Rank
Janette Neil	100 yd	12.0	5	did not advance			
Janette Neil	220 yd	DNS		did not advance			

Field events

Athlete	Event	Final	
Athlete	Event	Distance	Rank
Janette Neil	Long jump	17 ft 10 in (5.44 m)	8

=== Boxing ===
Athlete	Events	Club	Medals
John Fisher	75kg middleweight	Fauldhouse Miners	
Dick McTaggart	63.5kg light-welterweight	Kelvin	Silver medal
Bobby Mallon	51kg flyweight	Kelvin	Gold medal
John McDermott	57kg featherweight	Scottish National	Gold medal
Tom Menzies	81kg light-heavyweight	Monkland and Army	Bronze medal

=== Cycling ===
Athlete	Events	Club	Medals
Alfie Fairweather	road race, scratch race	Glasgow Wheelers	
Ian Thomson	road race, scratch race	VC Stella, Glasgow	

=== Diving ===
Athlete	Events	Club	Medals
Brian Davidson	10m platform	Inverness	

=== Fencing ===
Athlete	Events	Club	Medals
John King	Épée, foil, sabre	Bon Accord Fencing Club	
Sandy Leckie	foil, sabre	Scottish Fencing Union	Gold medal

=== Lawn bowls ===
Athlete	Events	Club	Medals
Joseph Black	singles, fours/rinks	Sanquhar BC	,
Thomas Hamill	pairs, fours/rinks	Rankin Park, Greenock	,
William Moore	fours/rinks	Dreghorn BC	Silver medal
Michael Purdon	pairs, fours/rinks	Rankin Park, Greenock	,

=== Swimming ===
Men

Athlete	Events	Club	Medals
Ian Blyth	110/220y butterfly, 400y medley, relay	Dundee Whitehall	
Cleve Cowie	110/220y breaststroke, relay	Gordonians	
Andrew Harrower	110/220y backstroke, 400y medley, relay	Dunfermline Carnegie	
Bob McGregor	110 Yard freestyle, relay	Otter SC, Falkirk	

Women

Athlete	Events	Club	Medals
Ann Baxter	110/220y breaststroke	Dunfermline Carnegie	
Louise Campbell	110/220y backstroke	Dunfermline Carnegie	
Sheila Watt	110y butterfly	Dee Ladies	

=== Weightlifting ===
Athlete	Events	Club	Medals
Phil Caira	82.5kg light-heavyweight	Phil Caira Physical School of Training, Kirkcaldy	Gold medal
Jimmy Moir	67.5kg lightweight	Viking WC, Glasgow	Bronze medal

=== Wrestling ===
Athlete	Events	Club	Medals
George Farquhar	74kg welterweight	Milton AWC, Edinburgh	
Alastair McNeill	82kg middleweight	Carnegie AWC, Dunfermline	
Jim Turnbull	57kg bantamweight	Milton AWC, Edinburgh	Bronze medal
