= 1960 AAA Championships =

Outdoor track and field competition

- Dates: 15–16 July 1960
- Host city: London, England
- Venue: White City Stadium
- Level: Senior
- Type: Outdoor

The 1960 AAA Championships was the 1960 edition of the annual outdoor track and field competition organised by the Amateur Athletic Association (AAA). It was held from 15 to 16 July 1960 at White City Stadium in London, England.

== Summary ==
The Championships covered two days of competition. The marathon and the decathlon events were held in Welwyn Garden City.

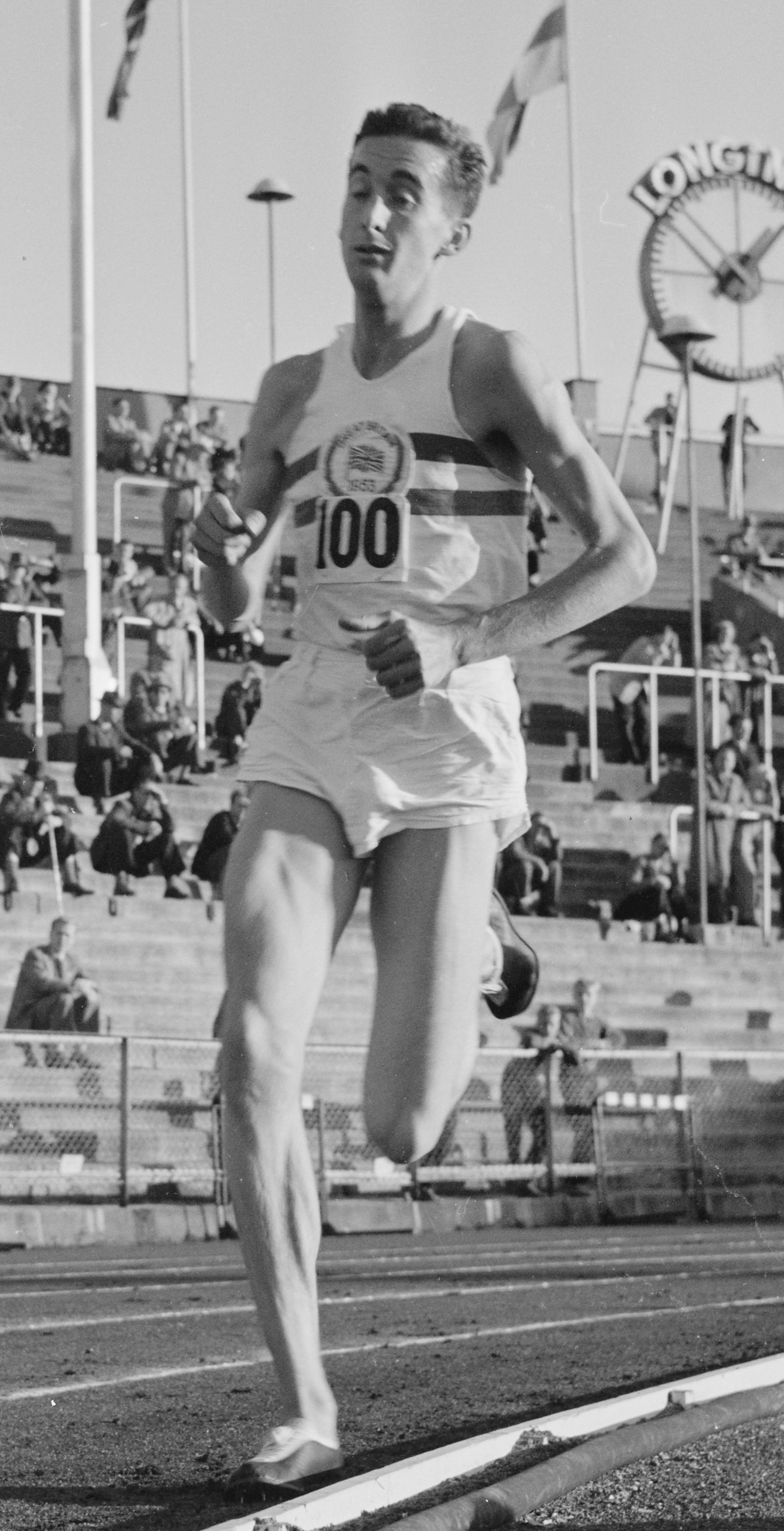
Gordon Pirie won his sixth AAA title

== Results ==
Event	Gold		Silver		Bronze	
100 yards	Peter Radford	9.62 NR	David Jones	9.70	(Wales) Nick Whitehead	9.80
220 yards	David Jones	21.31	David Segal	21.55	(Scotland) Mike Hildrey	21.67
440 yards	(India) Milkha Singh	46.56	Robbie Brightwell	47.05	Malcolm Yardley	47.36
880 yards	Tom Farrell	1:49.40	(Scotland) John Wenk	1:49.56	Brian Hewson	1:49.56
1 mile	(Hungary) László Tábori	4:01.02	Mike Wiggs	4:01.24	(France) Michel Jazy	4:01.28
3 miles	Frank Salvat	13:32.94	Bruce Tulloh	13:37.42	Laurie Reed	13:38.84
6 miles	Gordon Pirie	28:09.6	Martin Hyman	28:10.2	(Wales) John Merriman	28:10.8
10 miles	Basil Heatley	48:18.4 NR	(Scotland) Alastair Wood	49:24.6	Laurence Sykes	50:40.2
marathon	Brian Kilby	2:22:45	John Tarrant	2:25:17	Sam Hardicker	2:26:23
steeplechase	Eric Shirley	8:51.0	Dave Chapman	8:52.8	Michael Palmer	8:53.2
120y hurdles	(Pakistan) Ghulam Raziq	14.6	Mike Parker	14.8	Bob Birrell	14.9
220y hurdles	Chris Surety	24.9	Ken Wilmshurst	26.1	Paul Vine	26.1
440y hurdles	Max Boyes	52.27	John Metcalf	52.42	Tom Bryan	52.91
2 miles walk	Stan Vickers	13:02.4 NR	Ken Matthews	13:09.6	(East Germany) Dieter Lindner	13:44.4
7 miles walk	Ken Matthews	49:42.6	(East Germany) Siegfried Lefanczik	51:01.2	(East Germany) Max Weber	51:01.5
high jump	(Ghana) Robert Kotei	2.083	Gordon Miller	2.051 NR	(Scotland) Crawford Fairbrother	1.956
pole vault	Rex Porter	4.11	Ian Ward	4.11	James McManus	4.11
long jump	Fred Alsop	7.19	(Wales) Brian Woolley	7.15	John Lissaman	7.10
triple jump	Fred Alsop	15.44	(India) Mohinder Singh	15.06	Ken Wilmshurst	14.83
shot put	Arthur Rowe	18.04	(Scotland) Mike Lindsay	17.45	Martyn Lucking	17.04
discus throw	(Scotland) Mike Lindsay	52.62	Roy Hollingsworth	50.31	Eric Cleaver	47.27
hammer throw	Mike Ellis	64.19	(Pakistan) Muhammad Iqbal	60.14	Howard Payne	58.43
javelin throw	(Pakistan) Muhammad Nawaz	76.39	Roger Lane	74.32	Colin Smith	71.20
decathlon	Colin Andrews	6176 NR	Seamus McKinney	5732	(Scotland) George McLachlan	5588

== See also ==
- 1960 WAAA Championships
