= Rhodesia and Nyasaland at the 1962 British Empire and Commonwealth Games =

- Flag of the Federation of Rhodesia and Nyasaland
- CG code: FRN
- CGA: Rhodesian Olympic Committee
- Website: zoc.co.zw

in Perth, Western Australia
- Flag bearers: Opening: Closing:
- Medals Ranked =12th: Gold 0 Silver 2 Bronze 5 Total 7

British Empire and Commonwealth Games appearances
- 1962

Other related appearances
- Zimbabwe (1934–2002); Zambia (1954–pres.); Malawi (1970–pres.)

The Federation of Rhodesia and Nyasaland competed at the 1962 British Empire and Commonwealth Games in Perth, Western Australia, from 22 November to 1 December 1962.

== Medalists ==
Medal	Name	Sport	Event	Date
Silver	Danie Burger	Athletics	Men's pole vault	1 December
Bronze	Johan du Preez	Athletics	Men's 220 yards	29 November
Bronze	Terrence Sullivan	Athletics	Men's 1 mile	1 December

== Athletics ==
Men
Track events

Athlete	Event	Round 1		Round 2		Semifinal		Final	
Athlete	Event	Result	Rank	Result	Rank	Result	Rank	Result	Rank
Johan du Preez	100 yd	9.8	3 Q	10.1	4	Did not advance			
Jeffery Smith	100 yd	9.9	3 Q	10.0	4	Did not advance			
Johan du Preez	220 yd	21.8	2 Q	21.9	2 Q	21.5	3 Q	21.6	3rd place, bronze medalist(s)
Jeffery Smith	220 yd	21.8	2 Q	21.9	2 Q	21.5	3 Q	22.1	6
Jacob Ndhlovu	880 yd	1:54.3	4	—N/a		Did not advance			
Terrence Sullivan	880 yd	1:52.7	1 Q	—N/a		1:51.7	5	Did not advance	
Jacob Ndhlovu	1 mile	4:19.8	8	—N/a				Did not advance	
Terrence Sullivan	1 mile	4:06.6	1	—N/a				4:06.6	3rd place, bronze medalist(s)
Danie Burger	120 yd hurdles	14.8	3	—N/a				Did not advance	
Danie Burger; Roy Collins; Johan du Preez; Jeffery Smith	4×110 yd relay	42.6	3 Q	—N/a				42.7	4

Field events

Athlete	Event	Final	
Athlete	Event	Distance	Rank
Danie Burger	Pole vault	14 ft 6 in (4.42 m)	2nd place, silver medalist(s)
Roy Collins	Long jump	22 ft 10 1/4 in (6.97 m)	16
Roy Collins	Triple jump	DNS	

Women
Track events

Athlete	Event	Round 1		Semifinal		Final	
Athlete	Event	Result	Rank	Result	Rank	Result	Rank
Patricia Dalton	100 yd	11.8	6	Did not advance			
Patricia Dalton	220 yd	26.2	6	Did not advance			
Patricia Dalton	80 m hurdles	11.9	4	—N/a		Did not advance	

== See also ==
- Rhodesia at the 1960 Summer Olympics
- Rhodesia at the 1964 Summer Olympics
