= Athletics at the 1962 British Empire and Commonwealth Games – Men's pole vault =

Men's pole vault at the 1962 British Empire and Commonwealth Games
- Venue: Perry Lakes Stadium
- Date: 1 December 1962
- Competitors: 14 from 9 nations
- Winning height: 14 ft 9 in (4.50 m) GR

Medalists
gold medal	Trevor Bickle	Australia
silver medal	Danie Burger	Rhodesia and Nyasaland
bronze medal	Ross Filshie	Australia

The men's pole vault at the 1962 British Empire and Commonwealth Games as part of the athletics programme was held at the Perry Lakes Stadium on Saturday 1 December 1962.

The event was won by 19-year-old Australian Trevor Bickle. Bickle won by three inches ahead Danie Burger from the Federation of Rhodesia and Nyasaland and the Australian champion Ross Filshie. Bickle's jump of 14 ft 9 in (4.50 m) set three new records. It broke the British Empire and Commonwealth record by one inch, Geoff Elliott's Games record set in Vancouver eight years ago by nine inches and Filshie's Australian national record by three inches.

== Records ==
World record	Pentti Nikula (FIN)	16 ft 2 1/2 in (4.94 m)	Kauhava, Finland	22 June 1962
Commonwealth record				
Games record	Geoff Elliott (ENG)	14 ft 0 in (4.27 m)	Vancouver, Canada	7 August 1954

== Final ==
Rank	Name	Nationality	Result	Notes
1st place, gold medalist(s)	Trevor Bickle	Australia	14 ft 9 in (4.50 m)	GR, CR
2nd place, silver medalist(s)	Danie Burger	Rhodesia and Nyasaland	14 ft 6 in (4.42 m)	
3rd place, bronze medalist(s)	Ross Filshie	Australia	14 ft 6 in (4.42 m)	
4	Gerry Moro	Canada	14 ft 3 in (4.34 m)	
5	John Pfitzner	Australia	14 ft 0 in (4.27 m)	
6	Bob Watson	Canada	14 ft 0 in (4.27 m)	
7	Darcy McGonagle	New Zealand	13 ft 0 in (3.96 m)	
8	Allah Ditta	Pakistan	13 ft 0 in (3.96 m)	
9	Alf Groom	Canada	13 ft 0 in (3.96 m)	
10	Dave Stevenson	Scotland	13 ft 0 in (3.96 m)	
11	Kevin Gibbons	New Zealand	13 ft 0 in (3.96 m)	
12	Rex Porter	England	13 ft 0 in (3.96 m)	
13	Robin Barclay	Papua New Guinea	12 ft 6 in (3.81 m)	
	Ohere Asa Akuffo	Ghana		NM
