= Athletics at the 1962 British Empire and Commonwealth Games – Men's triple jump =

Men's triple jump at the 1962 British Empire and Commonwealth Games
- Venue: Perry Lakes Stadium
- Date: 29 November 1962
- Competitors: 15 from 11 nations
- Winning distance: 53 ft 2 in (16.21 m) GR

Medalists
gold medal	Ian Tomlinson	Australia
silver medal	John Baguley	Australia
bronze medal	Fred Alsop	England

The men's triple jump at the 1962 British Empire and Commonwealth Games as part of the athletics programme was held at the Perry Lakes Stadium on Thursday 29 November 1962.

The event was won by the defending champion Australian Ian Tomlinson with a jump of 53 ft 2 in (16.21 m), breaking his own Games record by over a foot. Tomlinson won by 4 3/4 in (12 cm), ahead of his compatriot John Baguley and Fred Alsop from England who won the bronze medal.

Wales' Lynn Davies who had finished fourth in the long jump failed to record a single legal jump.

== Records ==
World record	Józef Szmidt (POL)	55 ft 10 1/4 in (17.02 m)	Olsztyn, Poland	5 August 1960
Commonwealth record				
Games record	Ian Tomlinson (AUS)	51 ft 7 3/4 in (15.74 m)	Cardiff, Wales	24 July 1958

The following records were established during the competition:

Date	Event	Name	Nationality	Time	Record
29 November	Final	Ian Tomlinson	Australia	53 ft 2 in (16.21 m)	GR
29 November	Final	Fred Alsop	England	52 ft 7 in (16.03 m)	NR

== Final ==
Rank	Name	Nationality	Result	Notes
1st place, gold medalist(s)	Ian Tomlinson	Australia	53 ft 2 in (16.21 m)	GR
2nd place, silver medalist(s)	John Baguley	Australia	52 ft 9 1/4 in (16.08 m)	
3rd place, bronze medalist(s)	Fred Alsop	England	52 ft 7 in (16.03 m)	BR
4	Graham Boase	Australia	51 ft 8 3/4 in (15.77 m)	
5	Mahoney Samuels	Jamaica	50 ft 10 1/4 in (15.50 m)	
6	Dave Norris	New Zealand	50 ft 6 1/2 in (15.41 m)	
7	Paul Odhiambo	Kenya	48 ft 11 1/2 in (14.92 m)	
8	Kevin Rule	Australia	48 ft 10 1/2 in (14.90 m)	
9	Lawrence Ogwang	Uganda	48 ft 9 in (14.86 m)	
10	Gabuh Piging	British North Borneo	47 ft 5 1/2 in (14.47 m)	
11	John Howell	England	47 ft 0 in (14.33 m)	
12	Leroy Lucas	British Honduras	43 ft 7 1/4 in (13.29 m)	
	Lynn Davies	Wales		NM
	Allen Crawley	Papua New Guinea		DNS
	Roy Collins	Rhodesia and Nyasaland		DNS
