= Mike Berisford =

Scottish athlete

Personal information
- Nationality: British (Scottish)
- Born: 8 April 1936 Altrincham, England

Sport
- Sport: Athletics
- Event(s): Middle-distance, cross country
- Club: Sale Harriers

Michael R. Berisford (born 8 April 1936) is a former track and field athlete from Scotland who competed at the 1958 British Empire and Commonwealth Games and the 1962 British Empire and Commonwealth Games (now Commonwealth Games).

== Biography ==
Berisford turned down a track scholarship to Villanova University and was a member of the Sale Harriers.

He represented the Scottish Empire and Commonwealth Games team at the 1958 British Empire Games in Cardiff, Wales, participating in one event, the 1 mile race, where he reached the final.

Four years later he went to a second Games for the Scottish team at the 1962 British Empire Games in Perth, Australia, participating in one event, the 1 mile race.

Berisford, a sugar salesman by profession, was the first Scottish athlete to break the 4 minute mile barrier, by running 3 minutes 59.24 seconds during the 1962 Emsley Carr mile.
