= Tony Harris (athlete) =

Welsh athlete

Personal information
- Nationality: British (Welsh)
- Born: 1941 Bridgend, Wales

Sport
- Sport: Athletics
- Event: Middle-distance
- Club: Mitcham AC

Anthony James Harris (born 1941) is a former track and field athlete from Wales, who competed at the 1962 British Empire and Commonwealth Games and the 1966 British Empire and Commonwealth Games (now Commonwealth Games).

== Biography ==
Harris was born in Bridgend, Wales but left for England aged 5. He was a member of the Mitcham Athletics Club.

In September 1962, he just missed out on the final of the European Championships 800 metres. Shortly afterwards, he represented the 1962 Welsh team at the 1962 British Empire and Commonwealth Games in Perth, Australia, where he participated in two events; the 880 yards race and the one mile race.

In 1966, he went to his second Commonwealth Games in Kingston, Jamaica, competing for the 1966 Welsh team in the 880 yards and mile again.

He set 13 Welsh records during his career and was the first Welsh athlete to break 1 min 560 sec for 880 yards and the first Welshman to run under four minutes for the mile.
