= Trevor Bickle =

Australian pole vaulter (born 1943)

Personal information
- Born: Trevor Sydney Bickle; 17 July 1943 (age 82)

Sport
- Country: Australia
Medal record
Men's athletics
Representing Australia
Commonwealth Games
Gold medal – first place	1962 Perth	Men's Pole Vault

Trevor Sydney Bickle (born 17 July 1943 in Fremantle, Western Australia) is a former Western Australian athlete and Commonwealth pole vault champion.

At 16, Bickle was "volunteered" to contest an F-grade pole vault event at his local athletics club by his coach. He won the event and went on to a highly successful international career in the sport.

In the 1962 Commonwealth Games in Perth at Perry Lakes Stadium, he won the gold medal with a vault of 14 ft 9 in (4.50 m). In Jamaica four years later at 1966 Games he won again, retaining the Commonwealth title with a vault of 15 ft 9 in (4.80 m) – his best competition result. He won Australian titles in 1963, 1966 and 1967 but was unlucky to miss selection for the 1964 Tokyo Olympics when he broke his pole in the selection trials.

Bickle retired from competition in 1967 when he represented the Commonwealth of Nations against the United States in Los Angeles.

In 1965 he played a single game for South Fremantle in the West Australian Football League.

In 1989 Bickle was inducted into the Western Australian Hall of Champions.
