= David England (sprinter) =

Welsh athlete

Personal information
- Nationality: British (Welsh)
- Born: c.1942

Sport
- Sport: Athletics
- Event: Sprints
- Club: Small Heath Harriers, Birmingham
Medal record
Representing Wales
British Empire and Commonwealth Games
Bronze medal – third place	1962 Perth	4 × 110 yd relay

David England (born c.1942) is a former track and field athlete from Wales, who competed at the 1962 British Empire and Commonwealth Games (now Commonwealth Games).

== Biography ==
David England was a member of the Small Heath Harriers in Birmingham.

He represented the 1962 Welsh team at the 1962 British Empire and Commonwealth Games in Perth, Australia, where he participated in two events; the 220 yards race and the 4 × 110 yards relay. He won the bronze medal with Ron Jones, Berwyn Jones and Nick Whitehead in the relay.
