= Alistair McIlroy =

Scottish athlete

Personal information
- Nationality: British (Scottish)

Sport
- Sport: Athletics
- Event: Sprints
- Club: Thurrock Harriers, Essex

Alistair McIlroy was a track and field athlete from Scotland who competed at the 1962 British Empire and Commonwealth Games (now Commonwealth Games).

== Biography ==
McIlroy was a member of the Thurrock Harriers in Essex and specialised in the sprint distances of 100 and 220 yards.

He won the 1961 Scottish 220 yards AAA Championship title.

He represented the Scottish Empire and Commonwealth Games team at the 1962 British Empire Games in Perth, Australia, participating in two events, the 100 yards and 220 yards.
