= Bahamas at the 1962 British Empire and Commonwealth Games =

- Flag of the Bahamas
- CGF code: BAH
- CGA: Bahamas Olympic Committee
- Website: bahamasolympiccommittee.org

in Perth, Western Australia
- Competitors: 1 in 1 sport
- Flag bearers: Opening: Closing:
- Medals Ranked 14thth: Gold 0 Silver 1 Bronze 0 Total 1

British Empire and Commonwealth Games appearances
- 1954; 1958; 1962; 1966; 1970; 1974; 1978; 1982; 1986; 1990; 1994; 1998; 2002; 2006; 2010; 2014; 2018; 2022; 2026; 2030

The Bahamas competed at the 1962 British Empire and Commonwealth Games in Perth, Western Australia, from 22 November to 1 December 1962. It won one silver medal at the games.

== Medalists ==
Medal	Name	Sport	Event	Date
Silver	Tom Robinson	Athletics	Men's 100 yards	24 November

== Athletics ==
Men
Track events

Athlete	Event	Round 1		Round 2		Semifinal		Final	
Athlete	Event	Result	Rank	Result	Rank	Result	Rank	Result	Rank
Tom Robinson	100 yd	9.4	1 Q	9.6	1 Q	9.5	2 Q	9.6	2nd place, silver medalist(s)
Tom Robinson	220 yd	21.2	1 Q	21.6	1 Q	21.5	5	did not advance	

Key

- Note–Ranks given for track events are within the athlete's heat only
- Q = Qualified for the next round
