= Peter Snell =

New Zealand middle-distance runner (1938–2019)

Sir Peter Snell KNZM OBE
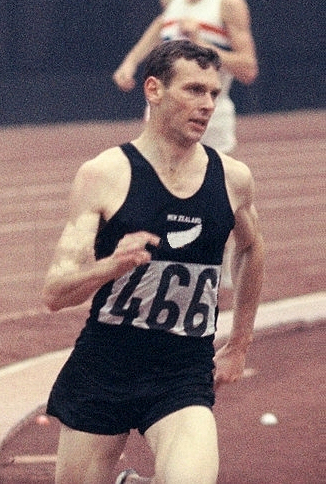
- Snell at the 1964 Summer Olympics

Personal information
- Born: Peter George Snell; 17 December 1938 Ōpunake, New Zealand
- Died: 12 December 2019 (aged 80) Dallas, Texas, United States
- Height: 1.79 m (5 ft 10 in)
- Weight: 80 kg (176.4 lb; 12.6 st)

Sport
- Sport: Athletics
- Events: 800 m, 1500 m
- Coached by: Arthur Lydiard

Achievements and titles
- Personal bests: 800 metres: 1:44.3 (WR); 880 yards: 1:45.1 WR; 1000 metres: 2:16.6 WR; 1500 metres: 3:37.6^{1} Mile: 3:54.4 WR; Mile 3:54.1 WR; 4 × 1 mile relay: 16.23.8 WR (with Murray Halberg, Gary Philpott & Barry Magee)
Medal record
Representing New Zealand
Olympic Games
Gold medal – first place	1960 Rome	800 metres
Gold medal – first place	1964 Tokyo	800 metres
Gold medal – first place	1964 Tokyo	1500 metres
Commonwealth Games
Gold medal – first place	1962 Perth	880 yards
Gold medal – first place	1962 Perth	1 mile

Sir Peter George Snell KNZM OBE (17 December 1938 – 12 December 2019) was a New Zealand middle-distance runner. He won three Olympic gold medals, and is the only man since 1920 to have won both the 800 and 1500 metres at the same Olympics, in 1964.

Snell had a relatively short career as a world-famous international sportsman, from 1960 to1965, yet achieved so much that he was voted New Zealand's "Sports Champion of the (20th) Century" and was one of 24 inaugural members of the International Association of Athletics Federations Hall of Fame named in 2012. A protégé of the New Zealand athletics coach Arthur Lydiard, Snell was known for the three Olympic and two Commonwealth Games gold medals he won, and the several world records he set.

== Early athletic career ==
Born in Ōpunake, Snell moved with his family to Waikato in 1949, where he attended Te Aroha College and became an all-around sportsman. He won several middle-distance running events in his hometown of Te Aroha, although some members of his new school lived in Ngāruawāhia. In 1955, he became a boarding student at Mount Albert Grammar School in Auckland, where he took up a wide range of team and individual sports, including rugby union, cricket, tennis, badminton, and golf. As a teenager, Snell excelled in tennis, and pursued the sport through appearances at the Auckland and New Zealand Junior Tennis Championships.

At age 19, Snell was motivated to concentrate seriously on running by the comments for his future coach, Arthur Lydiard, who told him, "Peter, with the sort of speed you've got, if you do the endurance training, you could be one of our best middle-distance runners." During his early career under the tutelage of Lydiard, he started with New Zealand titles and records for 880 yards and the mile, despite being an unusually large and powerful man by typical middle-distance runner standards.

== Olympic success ==
Snell came to international attention after winning the gold medal in the 800 metres at the Rome Olympics in 1960, setting a new national record. He was particularly dominant four years later at the Tokyo Olympics where he won gold and set a new Olympic record in the 800 metres, and as well as gold in the 1500 metres.

By winning the 800m/1500m double, Snell became the fifth male athlete to achieve this feat at the Olympics after Edwin Flack (1896 Summer Olympics), Jim Lightbody (1904 Summer Olympics), Mel Sheppard (1908 Summer Olympics), and Albert Hill in 1920,, and it has not been achieved by any male athlete at the Olympics since. It was not achieved by a male at an open global championship until Moroccan-born Rashid Ramzi of Bahrain won both golds at the World Championships in 2005 at Helsinki. (After the 2008 Olympic Games, Ramzi was stripped of his Olympic gold medal for doping, but the penalty was not applied retroactively to his World Championship gold medals.)

== World records ==
In early 1962, Snell lowered the world mile record by a tenth of a second at Cooks Gardens in Whanganui on 27 January, and one week later set new world records for both the 800 m and 880 yards (804.7 m) in Christchurch. He then won gold and set a new record in the 880 yd at the Commonwealth Games in Perth in 1962, and won gold for the mile at those same games. In all, Snell set five individual world records and joined fellow New Zealand athletes to set a new four by one mile relay record as well.

Snell's 800 m time of 1:44.3, set on 3 February 1962, remained the world record until Marcello Fiasconaro ran 1:43.7 on 27 June 1973. It was the Oceania area record until Joseph Deng ran 1:44.21 on 20 July 2018. It was also the oldest national record recognised by the IAAF for a standard track-and-field event, lasting for 62 years until James Preston ran 1:44.04 on 25 May 2024, five years after Snell's death. His time remains the fastest ever run over that distance on a grass track.

Fatigued after his Olympic buildup and second world mile record in 1964, his final track season in 1965 was characterised by a string of losses to athletes such as Olympic 1500 m silver medalist Josef Odlozil, Olympic 800 m silver medalist Bill Crothers, U.S. high schooler and future world record holder Jim Ryun, and the American Jim Grelle. Snell then announced his retirement.

== Career after retirement from sport ==
Snell worked for a tobacco company and lived in Mount Albert, before moving to the United States in 1971 to further his education. He gained a B.S. in human performance from the University of California, Davis, and then a PhD in exercise physiology from Washington State University. He joined the University of Texas Southwestern Medical Center at Dallas as a research fellow in 1981. He later become an associate professor, Department of Internal Medicine and also director of their Human Performance Centre. A member of the American College of Sports Medicine, Snell was honoured in 1999 as an Inaugural Inductee, International Scholar, into the Athlete Hall of Fame, University of Rhode Island.

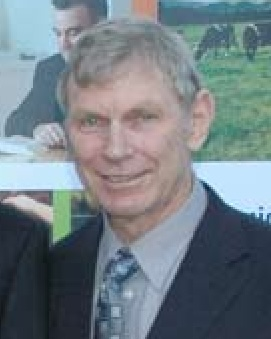
Snell in 2007

Adopting a new sport, Snell became an orienteer and won his category, men aged 65 and older, in the 2003 United States Orienteering Championship. He was a past president of the North Texas Orienteering Association and a member of the United States Orienteering Federation.

Snell also became a competitive table tennis player including competing in Texas state (finishing in the top 4 in the 75+ age category) and U.S. championship events and also the 2017 World Masters Games in Auckland.

Snell died at his home in Dallas, Texas, on 12 December 2019, just five days short of turning 81. The cause was heart failure. Miki, his wife, survived him.

== Commemorations and awards ==
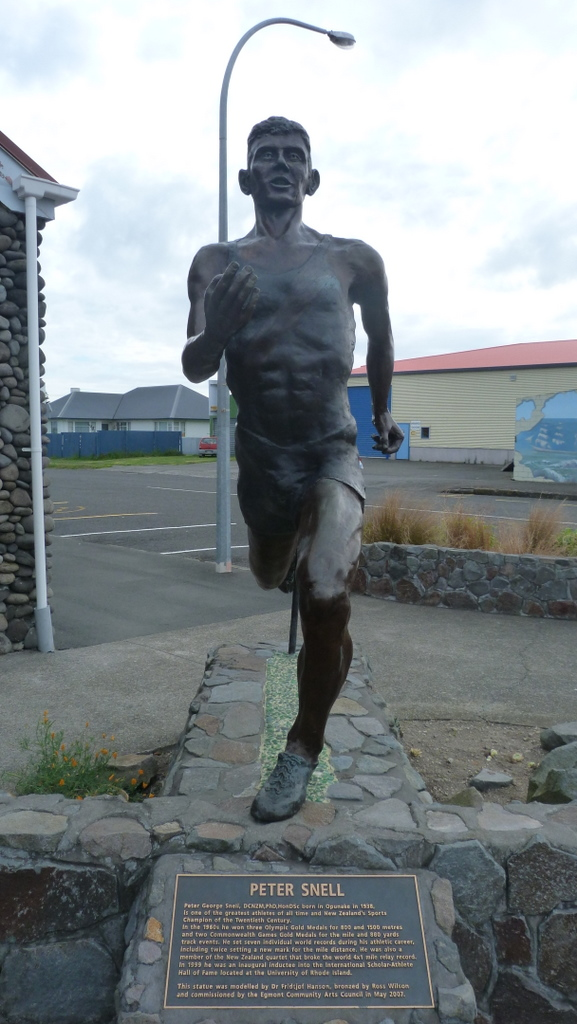
Statue of Snell erected in 2007

Following his success at the Perth Commonwealth Games in 1962, Snell was appointed a Member of the Order of the British Empire for services to athletics in the 1962 Queen's Birthday Honours. Three years later, he was elevated to Officer of the same order in the 1965 New Year Honours.

He was voted New Zealand's Sports Champion of the Century in 2000 and was knighted soon afterwards. In the 2002 New Year Honours, he was appointed a Distinguished Companion of the New Zealand Order of Merit for services to sport, and in 2009, following the restoration of titular honours by the New Zealand government, he accepted redesignation as a Knight Companion of the New Zealand Order of Merit and was invested by the Governor-General of New Zealand, Sir Anand Satyanand.

Snell was one of five Olympic athletes from New Zealand featured on a series of commemorative postage stamps issued in August 2004 to commemorate the 2004 Olympic Games. The two-dollar stamp issued by New Zealand Post features a stylised photograph of Snell snapping the tape at the finish line of the 800 metres race at the 1960 Olympics in Rome.

He was selected by Track and Field News' as their "Athlete of the '60's" and was pictured on the cover of the December 1969 issue. In 2007, he was awarded an honorary doctorate (DSc) by Massey University in recognition of his work as an exercise physiologist.

A larger than life-size bronze statue of Peter Snell was erected in his hometown of Ōpunake, Taranaki, and was unveiled on 19 May 2007. The statue is based on a photo of Snell crossing the finish line in the historic race at Wanganui's Cook's Gardens in 1962. A similar bronze statue of Snell was unveiled in Cook's Gardens on 15 August 2009 to commemorate his athletic achievements.

Interviewed by the Wanganui Chronicle after the unveiling, Snell said he was internationally known as a miler, but had never reached his potential over the mile and the 800 metres was probably his best distance. He said his greatest effort was the world 800 m/880 yard double record set on Lancaster Park a few days after his new mile record, with an 800 m time that would have won the gold medal 46 years later at the Beijing Olympics.

Snell was inducted into the Taranaki Sports Hall of Fame at the Taranaki Sports Awards 2021.

== Honorific eponyms ==
In 2001, Macleans College in Auckland created Snell House as part of its "whanau house" system.

The Peter Snell Youth Village, on the Whangaparaoa Peninsula, in North Auckland, is also named after him. They run holiday camps for young people.

Snell Drive, in the Hamilton suburb of Chartwell, is named in Snell's honour.

Peter Snell Street is a street in the Bay of Plenty town of Whakatāne. Peter Snell Drive is the location of Bream Bay College in Ruakaka in Te Tai Tokerau Northland.

== Personal bests ==
Distance	Time	Place	Year
800 m	1:44.3 WR	Christchurch	1962
1000 m	2:16.6 WR	Auckland	1964
1500 m*	3:37.6	Auckland	1964
Mile	3:54.1 WR	Auckland	1964

== Notes ==
- ^1 En route in the 3:54.1 mile.

Records
Preceded by (Belgium) Roger Moens	Men's 800 metres world record holder equalled by Ralph Doubell and Dave Wottle; 2 February 1962 – 27 June 1973	Succeeded by (Italy) Marcello Fiasconaro
Preceded by (Australia) Herb Elliott	Men's mile world record holder 27 January 1962 – 9 June 1965	Succeeded by (France) Michel Jazy
Awards and achievements
Preceded by (United States) Ralph Boston	Track & Field Athlete of the Year; 1962; 1964	Succeeded by (Chinese Taipei) Yang Chuan-kwang
Preceded by (Chinese Taipei) Yang Chuan-kwang	Track & Field Athlete of the Year; 1962; 1964	Succeeded by (Australia) Ron Clarke
Preceded by Murray Halberg	Lonsdale Cup of the New Zealand Olympic Committee; 1962; 1964	Succeeded by Bill Baillie
Preceded by Bill Baillie	Lonsdale Cup of the New Zealand Olympic Committee; 1962; 1964	Succeeded by Don Oliver
