= John Wenk =

British athlete

Personal information
- Nationality: British
- Born: 4 October 1938 (age 87) Welwyn, England
- Height: 178 cm (5 ft 10 in)
- Weight: 69 kg (152 lb)

Sport
- Sport: Athletics
- Event: Middle-distance running
- Club: Welwyn Athletic Club

John Edward Wenk (born 4 October 1938) is a British middle-distance runner who competed at the 1960 Summer Olympics.

== Biography ==
Wenk finished second behind Tom Farrell in the 880 yards event at the 1960 AAA Championships.

At the 1960 Olympic Games in Rome, he represented Great Britain in the men's 800 metres.

Wenk represented Scotland in the 880 yards event at the 1962 British Empire and Commonwealth Games in Perth, Western Australia, where he reached the semi finals.
