= Nakuru AllStars (1961) =

Kenyan football club

Nakuru AllStars was a Kenyan football team. They won the first ever Kenyan Premier League in 1963, when managed by English coach Ray Batchelor. They repeated the feat again in 1969.

In 2010, a revived and reformed club, Nakuru AllStars, was formed.
