= Aden at the 1962 British Empire and Commonwealth Games =

- Flag of the Colony of Aden
- CGF code: ADN

in Perth, Western Australia
- Competitors: 9 (all men) in 1 sport
- Flag bearers: Opening: Closing:
- Medals: Gold 0 Silver 0 Bronze 0 Total 0

British Empire and Commonwealth Games appearances
- 1962; 1966

The Colony of Aden competed at the 1962 British Empire and Commonwealth Games in Perth, Western Australia, from 22 November to 1 December 1962.

== Athletics ==
Men
Track events

Athlete	Event	Round 1		Round 2		Semifinal		Final	
Athlete	Event	Result	Rank	Result	Rank	Result	Rank	Result	Rank
Alastair Cook	100 yd	10.3	6	Did not advance					
Yassim Deria	100 yd	10.8	5	Did not advance					
Ali Abdi Matar	100 yd	10.8	5	Did not advance					
Michael Shaw	100 yd	10.3	6	Did not advance					
Alastair Cook	220 yd	23.0	6	Did not advance					
Yassim Deria	220 yd	DNS		Did not advance					
Ali Abdi Matar	220 yd	24.0	7	Did not advance					
Christopher Salole	220 yd	23.2	5	Did not advance					
Nasser Ahmed	440 yd	56.3	6	—N/a		Did not advance			
David Griffiths	880 yd	1:54.8	4	—N/a		Did not advance			
Daria Mohammed	880 yd	2:01.6	5	—N/a		Did not advance			
Said Adeeb	1 mile	DNS		—N/a				Did not advance	
David Griffiths	1 mile	4:23.5	9	—N/a				Did not advance	
Daria Mohammed	1 mile	4:33.9	9	—N/a				Did not advance	
Said Adeeb	3 miles	—N/a						DNS	
Christopher Salole	120 yd hurdles	15.8	4	—N/a				Did not advance	
Alastair Cook; Ali Abdi Matar; Christopher Salole; Michael Shaw	4×110 yd relay	43.8	4	—N/a				Did not advance	

Key

- Note–Ranks given for track events are within the athlete's heat only
- N/A = Round not applicable for the event
