= Papua and New Guinea at the 1962 British Empire and Commonwealth Games =

Papua New Guinea at the 1962 British Empire and Commonwealth Games
- CG code: PNG
- CGA: Papua New Guinea Olympic Committee
- Website: oceaniasport.com/png

in Perth, Western Australia
- Flag bearers: Opening: Closing:
- Medals Ranked =17thth: Gold 0 Silver 0 Bronze 1 Total 1

British Empire and Commonwealth Games appearances
- 1962; 1966; 1970; 1974; 1978; 1982; 1986; 1990; 1994; 1998; 2002; 2006; 2010; 2014; 2018; 2022; 2026; 2030

The Territory of Papua and New Guinea competed at the 1962 British Empire and Commonwealth Games in Perth, Western Australia, from 22 November to 1 December 1962. It won one bronze medal at the games.

== Medalists ==
Medal	Name	Sport	Event	Date
Bronze	Kenneth Hopkins	Boxing	Men's light middleweight	

== Athletics ==
Men
Track events

Athlete	Event	Round 1		Round 2		Semifinal		Final	
Athlete	Event	Result	Rank	Result	Rank	Result	Rank	Result	Rank
Allen Crawley	100 yd	10.0	5	did not advance					
Leana Gari	100 yd	10.3	5	did not advance					
Misiloarim Labert	100 yd	10.3	4 Q	10.5	6	did not advance			
Bruce Richter	100 yd	10.1	4 Q	10.5	6	did not advance			
Bruce Richter	220 yd	22.2	3 Q	22.6	6	did not advance			
John Kaputin	440 yd	51.4	5	—N/a		did not advance			
Damian Midi	440 yd	52.9	5	—N/a		did not advance			
Allen Crawley; Leana Gari; Misiloarim Labert; Bruce Richter	4×110 yd relay	43.6	5	—N/a				did not advance	

Field events

Athlete	Event	Final	
Athlete	Event	Distance	Rank
Edward Laboran	High jump	6 ft 4 in (1.93 m)	11
Robin Barclay	Pole vault	12 ft 6 in (3.81 m)	13
Allen Crawley	Long jump	23 ft 8 3/4 in (7.23 m)	12
Allen Crawley	Triple jump	DNS	
George Heriot	Javelin throw	175 ft 11 1/2 in (53.63 m)	11
Ivaharia Oe	Javelin throw	200 ft 6 1/2 in (61.13 m)	8
