= Mauritius at the 1962 British Empire and Commonwealth Games =

- CGF code: MRI
- CGA: Mauritius Olympic Committee

in Perth, Western Australia
- Competitors: 5 in 1 sport
- Flag bearers: Opening: Closing:
- Medals: Gold 0 Silver 0 Bronze 0 Total 0

British Empire and Commonwealth Games appearances
- 1958; 1962; 1966; 1970; 1974; 1978; 1982; 1986; 1990; 1994; 1998; 2002; 2006; 2010; 2014; 2018; 2022; 2026; 2030

British Mauritius competed at the 1962 British Empire and Commonwealth Games in Perth, Western Australia, from 22 November to 1 December 1962. It did not win any medals at the games.

== Athletics ==
Men
Track events

Athlete	Event	Round 1		Round 2		Semifinal		Final	
Athlete	Event	Result	Rank	Result	Rank	Result	Rank	Result	Rank
Paul Couve	100 yd	DNS		did not advance					
Jacques Dalais	100 yd	10.2	5	did not advance					
Jean Daruty	100 yd	10.2	4 Q	10.4	4	did not advance			
Guy Edmond	100 yd	10.1	5	did not advance					
Paul Couve	220 yd	DNS		did not advance					
Jacques Dalais	220 yd	22.9	5	did not advance					
Jean Daruty	220 yd	22.7	6	did not advance					
Guy Edmond	220 yd	22.5	5	did not advance					
Cyril Cure	880 yd	1:58.6	4	—		did not advance			
Cyril Cure	1 mile	DNF		—				did not advance	
Paul Couve; Jacques Dalais; Jean Daruty; Guy Edmond	4×110 yd relay	43.2	4	—				did not advance	
