= Trinidad and Tobago at the 1962 British Empire and Commonwealth Games =

- CG code: TRI
- CGA: Trinidad and Tobago Olympic Committee
- Website: ttoc.org

in Perth, Western Australia
- Flag bearers: Opening: Closing:
- Medals Ranked =15thth: Gold 0 Silver 0 Bronze 2 Total 2

British Empire and Commonwealth Games appearances
- 1934; 1938; 1950; 1954; 1958; 1962; 1966; 1970; 1974; 1978; 1982; 1986; 1990; 1994; 1998; 2002; 2006; 2010; 2014; 2018; 2022; 2026; 2030

Trinidad and Tobago competed at the 1962 British Empire and Commonwealth Games in Perth, Western Australia, from 22 November to 1 December 1962.

== Medalists ==
| Medal | Name | Sport | Event | Date |
|---|---|---|---|---|
| Bronze | Jackie Samuel | Weightlifting | Men's middle heavyweight | |
| Bronze | Brandon Bailey | Weightlifting | Men's heavyweight | |

== Athletics ==
Men
Track events

| Athlete | Event | Round 1 | | Round 2 | | Semifinal | | Final | |
| Athlete | Event | Result | Rank | Result | Rank | Result | Rank | Result | Rank |
|---|---|---|---|---|---|---|---|---|---|
| Edwin Roberts | 100 yd | 9.6 | 1 Q | 10.0 | 3 | did not advance | | | |
| Edwin Roberts | 220 yd | 21.6 | 2 Q | 22.2 | 4 | did not advance | | | |

== See also ==
- British West Indies at the 1960 Summer Olympics
- Trinidad and Tobago at the 1964 Summer Olympics
