= Mike Hildrey =

Scottish athlete

Personal information
- Nationality: British (Scottish)
- Born: 15 October 1941 Bute, Scotland

Sport
- Sport: Athletics
- Event: Sprints
- Club: Victoria Park AAC

Michael Hildrey (15 October 1941) is a former track and field athlete from Scotland who competed at the 1962 British Empire and Commonwealth Games (now Commonwealth Games).

== Biography ==
Hildrey attended school in Balfron and won the Scottish Schools titles over 100 and 220 yards. He gained the nickname the Balfron Bullet.

A member of the Victoria Park Amateur Athletic Club, he broke Eric Liddell's 1923 Scottish 220 yards record in June 1960 after running 21.5 seconds.

He represented the Scottish Empire and Commonwealth Games team at the 1962 British Empire Games in Perth, Australia, participating in two events, the 100 yards and the 220 yards.
