= Hong Kong at the 1962 British Empire and Commonwealth Games =

- CGF code: HKG
- CGA: Sports Federation and Olympic Committee of Hong Kong
- Website: hkolympic.org

in Perth, Western Australia
- Flag bearers: Opening: Closing:
- Medals: Gold 0 Silver 0 Bronze 0 Total 0

British Empire and Commonwealth Games appearances
- 1934; 1938–1950; 1954; 1958; 1962; 1966; 1970; 1974; 1978; 1982; 1986; 1990; 1994

British Hong Kong competed at the 1962 British Empire and Commonwealth Games in Perth, Western Australia, from 22 November to 1 December 1962.

== Athletics ==
Men
Track events

Athlete	Event	Round 1		Round 2		Semifinal		Final	
Athlete	Event	Result	Rank	Result	Rank	Result	Rank	Result	Rank
Ken Peters	220 yd	22.0	4 Q	22.7	5	Did not advance			
Ken Peters	440 yd	49.0	6	Did not advance					
Patrick Field	880 yd	1:57.6	4	—N/a		Did not advance			
Ken Peters	440 yd hurdles	DNS		—N/a				Did not advance	

== See also ==
- Hong Kong at the 1960 Summer Olympics
- Hong Kong at the 1964 Summer Olympics
