= John Davies (runner) =

New Zealand Olympic bronze medalist and president of the New Zealand Olympic Committee

John Davies MBE
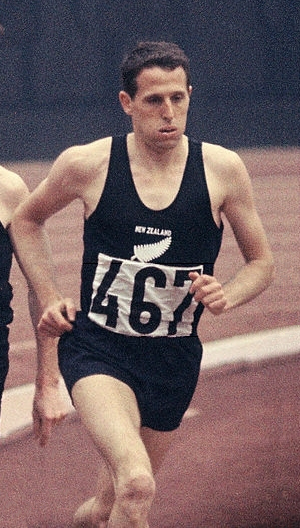
- Davies at the 1964 Olympics

Personal information
- Born: 25 May 1938 London, England
- Died: 21 July 2003 (aged 65) Auckland, New Zealand
- Height: 1.85 m (6 ft 1 in)
- Weight: 68 kg (150 lb)

Sport
- Country: New Zealand
- Sport: Athletics
- Event: 1500 m
- Club: Waikato

Achievements and titles
- Personal best: 1500 m – 3:39.6 (1964)
Medal record
Representing New Zealand
Olympic Games
| Bronze medal – third place | 1964 Tokyo | 1500 metres |
Commonwealth Games
| Silver medal – second place | 1962 Perth | 1 mile |

John Llewellyn Davies MBE (25 May 1938 – 21 July 2003) was a New Zealand Olympic bronze medallist and president of the New Zealand Olympic Committee (NZOC).

== Biography ==
Davies was born in London, England, to Welsh parents, and in 1953 moved to New Zealand with his family. The family settled in Tokoroa. He won a bronze medal in the 1500 metres at the 1964 Tokyo Olympic Games, and a silver medal in the one mile event at the 1962 Commonwealth Games in Perth.

Davies retired due to long-term injuries, and after that coached middle- and long-distance athletes, including 1976 Olympic 5000 m silver medallist Dick Quax, 1982 Commonwealth Games 3000m Gold Medalist Anne Audain who also broke the World 5000m record the same year. 1992 Olympic Marathon bronze medallist Lorraine Moller and 1996 Olympic 800 m finalist Toni Hodgkinson. He also contributed to sport as administrator and television commentator.

In the 1990 Queen's Birthday Honours, Davies was appointed a Member of the Order of the British Empire, for services to athletics. In October 2000, Davies succeeded Sir David Beattie to become the NZOC president. In 2003 he was awarded the Leonard Cuff medal by the International Olympic Academy for promoting olympism, only weeks before he died of melanoma.
