= Nick Whitehead =

Welsh sprinter (1933–2002)

Nick Whitehead OBE
Personal information
- Nationality: British (Welsh)
- Born: 29 May 1933 Wrexham, Wales
- Died: 6 October 2002 (aged 69) Newport, Wales
- Height: 180 cm (5 ft 11 in)
- Weight: 71 kg (11 st 3 lb)

Sport
- Sport: Athletics
- Event: Sprints
- Club: Birchfield Harriers
Medal record
Men's athletics
Representing Great Britain
Olympic Games
Bronze medal – third place	1960 Rome	4 × 100 m relay
Representing Wales
British Empire and Commonwealth Games
Bronze medal – third place	1962 Perth	4 × 110 yd relay

Neville Joseph Whitehead also known as Nick Whitehead OBE (29 May 1933 – 6 October 2002) was a Welsh sprinter and sports administrator.

== Biography ==
Whitehead was born in Wrexham and ran 9.9 secs during the 1957 season. He represented the Welsh team at the 1958 British Empire and Commonwealth Games in Cardiff, Wales, where he competed in the men's 100 yards event and helped Wales secure a fifth place finish in the final of the men's 4 × 110 yards relay with Ron Jones, Dewi Roberts and John Morgan.

He competed for Great Britain in the 1960 Summer Olympics in Rome in the 4 × 100 metres relay where he won the bronze medal with his teammates Peter Radford, David Jones and David Segal.

Whitehead went to a second Commonwealth Games when he represented the 1962 Welsh team at the 1962 British Empire and Commonwealth Games in Perth, Australia, where he participated in three events; the 100 yards race, the 220 yards race and the 4 × 110 yards relay. He won the bronze medal with Ron Jones, Berwyn Jones and David England in the relay.

He would later teach Physical Education at Carnegie Physical Training College in Leeds, now part of Leeds Metropolitan University. He was overall team manager of the British athletics team. He became director of the National Coaching Foundation and eventually Director of Development at the Sports Council for Wales (now Sport Wales). He was made an Officer of the Order of the British Empire (OBE) in the 1985 New Year Honours. He died, aged 69, in Newport, Pembrokeshire. He had a son Simon and two daughters; Jane and Rachel.
