= Black Aces FC =

Zimbabwean football club

Black Aces
- Full name: Black Aces Football Club
- Founded: 1972
- Dissolved: 2001
- Ground: Gwanzura Stadium; Harare, Zimbabwe
- Capacity: 5,000

Black Aces Football Club, the successor to Chibuku Shumba, was a Zimbabwean professional football club based in Harare. It was founded in 1972 and dissolved in 2001.

== History ==
Black Aces was formed from the ashes of Chibuku Shumba in 1977, which was affectionately named "Shaisa Mufaro", loosely translated to "party-poopers". They played successful games in the Castle Cup, Chibuku Trophy, BAT Rosebowl, and Rothmans Shield tournaments during the 1970s.

In the 1990s the Black Aces, coached by the Peter Nyama and later on by Swiss national Marc Duvillard, became one of the top clubs in the country.

When Black Aces lost their chief financier, Edgar Ricardo-Serafim, they vowed that they would win the BP League Cup as a fitting tribute to him. In 1999 Francis "Gaza" Jeyman captained the now struggling side to a famous BP Cup triumph.

The club was dissolved in 2001.

== Notable players and coaches ==
During its time in existence, Black Aces produced some of the household names in local football: July Sharara, Archieford Chimutanda, George Rollo, Shadreck Ngwenya, Brenna Msiska, Daniel Chikanda, Bernard Dzingayi, Byron "Piri Piri" Manuel, Rodrick Muganhiri, Fresh Chamarengah, Percy Mwase, Patrick Daka, David Muchineripi, the Mugeyi twins Wilfred and William, Stanley Mashezha, Itayi Kapini, Mike Bingandadi, Emmanuel Nyahuma, John Mbidzo, Francis Jayman, Tapuwa Kapini, Tinashe Nengomasha, Nqobizitha Ncube, Wonder Ngoko, Roy Muchuchu, Lewis Chihuri, Knowledge Zinyama, Herbert Zimbeva, Herbert Mbabvu, David Sengu, Tapfumanei Dodo, Timothy Cosmos, Alex Munawa, Vusi Lehar, Tendai Mwarura, George Takaruza and Butler Masango all made their name at Black Aces.

Byron Manuel (born c.1956), who first played for the Rhodesia Under-16 team, played and coached at his school, St John's High School. Black Aces coaches Bob Lines and Mitch Khan recruited him from there, and he was allowed to play for the club on Sundays. He was known as "Piri Piri" to his fans; manager Bruce Grobbelaar called him "the Apache Warrior" owing to his Native American ancestry. He joined Chibuku Shumba straight after leaving school in 1972, and after its demise and resurrection as the Black Aces, joined the new club. He was coached by English coach Ray Batchelor at some point in his career, and played with Rio Tinto FC in 1979. He moved to Canada in the late 1980s.

== Achievements ==
- Zimbabwe Premier Soccer League

Champions (1): 1992
Runners-up: 1980

- Zimbabwe Cup

Runners-up: 1980

- BP League Cup

Winners (1): 1999
