= Seraphino Antao =

Kenyan sprinter

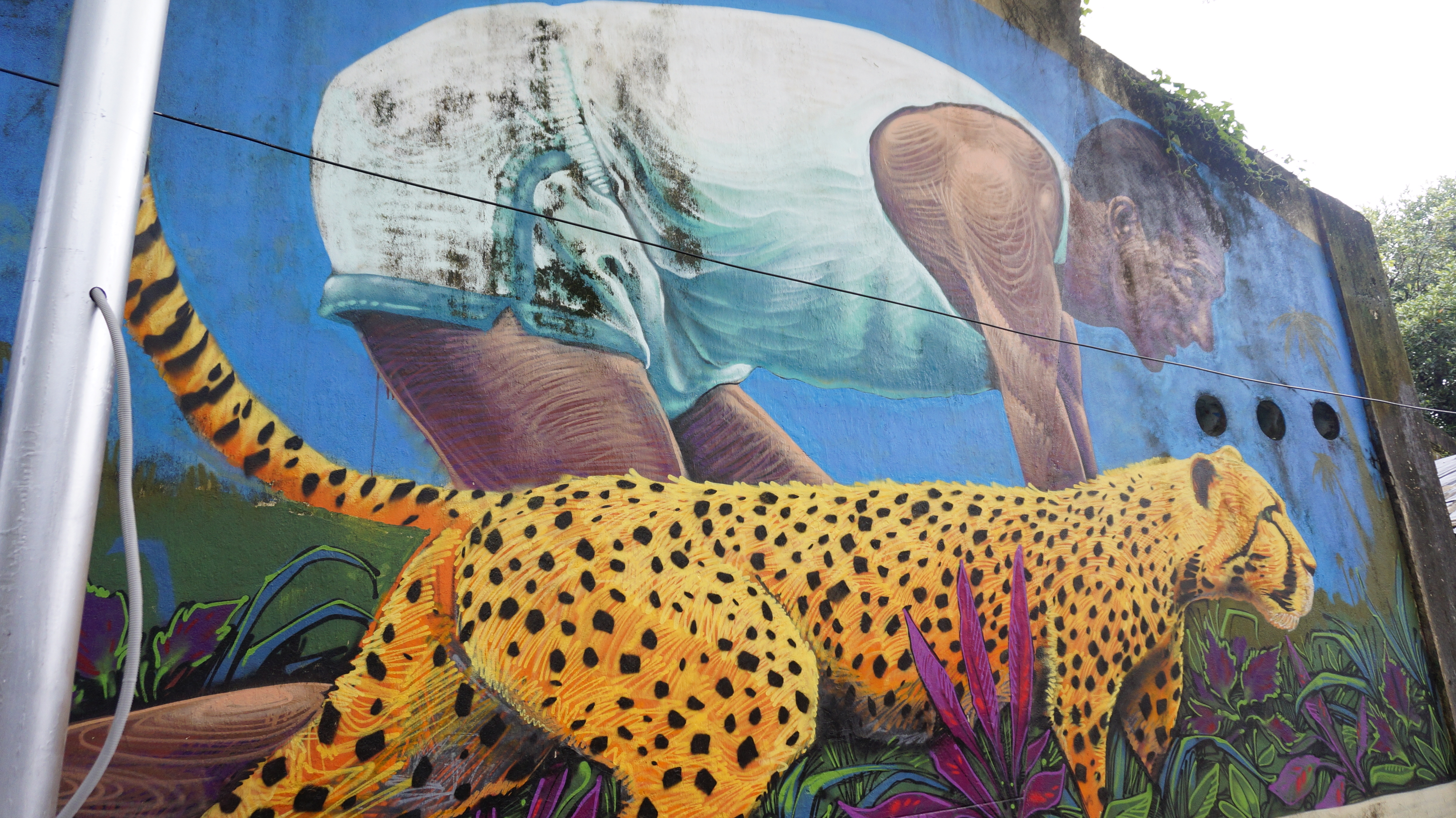
- Mural of Antao in Panaji, Goa

Personal information
- Nationality: Kenyan
- Born: 30 October 1937 Mombasa, Kenya
- Died: 6 September 2011 (aged 73) London, England
- Height: 180 cm (5 ft 11 in)
- Weight: 75 kg (165 lb)

Sport
- Sport: Athletics
- Event: Sprints
Medal record
Representing Kenya
British Empire and Commonwealth Games
Gold medal – first place	1962 Perth	100 yards
Gold medal – first place	1962 Perth	220 yards

Seraphino "Kelly" Antao (30 October 1937 – 6 September 2011) was a runner of Goan descent from Kenya. He won two events at the 1962 Commonwealth Games, making him the first Kenyan athlete to win a gold medal at an international level.

== Early life and education ==
Seraphino Antao was born in Chandor, Goa on 30 October 1937 and grew up in Mombasa. He was the son of Diego Manuel and Anna Maria, and had six siblings. He was of Asian origin, and had several athletes in his family.

While at Goan High School (now Mombasa High School), he took several sports and was a good footballer. After being spotted by an athletics coach, he took part in a local athletic event, where, running barefoot, his sprint times were only just short of national records.

In 1956, Seraphino entered an athletics carnival run by the Landing & Shipping Company (agents for East African Railways and Harbours Corporation) and won the sprint events.

He was at this time a member of the Achilles Athletics Club in Mombasa, where he trained under British coach Ray Batchelor, who had founded the Achilles Club, and remained his coach throughout his career.

While working for the Landing & Shipping Company for eight years, Antao used to train on the beach in Mombasa.

In 1957, he competed at the National Competitions in Nairobi, and there he broke the national records in the 100 and 220 yards.

He was nicknamed "Kelly" for his entire life.

== Athletic career ==
Antao competed at the 1958 Commonwealth Games in Cardiff, Wales, but without much success. Two years later Antao competed at the 1960 Summer Olympics in Rome, Italy, where he reached the 100 metres semi finals and 200 metres second round.

The 1962 Commonwealth Games in Perth, Western Australia, marked the highest point of his career, when he won 100 and 220 yards gold medals. This made him the first Kenyan athlete to win a gold medal at an international level. He was also a member of the Kenyan 4 x 440 yards relay team, which finished fifth. Other members of the relay team were Wilson Kiprugut, Kimaru Songok and Peter Francis.

Also in 1962, he won two gold medals (100 and 220 yards) at the British 1962 AAA Championships, which he attended three times. He also won several gold medals at the East and Central African Championships.

Antao trained hard in Kenya and did well in Europe in the lead-up to the 1964 Summer Olympics, winning at White City in London as well as in Czechoslovakia, Poland, Sweden, and other countries.

Kenya gained independence in December 1963, and Antao was appointed as flagbearer, the first for an independent Kenya at the 1964 Summer Olympics in Tokyo, Japan. However, he was ill and handed his duties as flag bearer to teammate Kipchoge Keino. Antao did not perform as well as expected on the track. He reached the 200 metres second round but was eliminated in the heats of the 100 metres

== Recognition ==
In 1965, Antao was awarded the Helms World Trophy for the Asian continent.

== Post-athletic life ==
In 1965, Antao retired from sport and, after giving some consideration to moving to Melbourne, Australia, moved to London, England. He took a coaching course at Loughborough College, owned a boutique in Kensington, and had a clothes stall in a market, before working as an accounts assistant with Thorn EMI.

In 2003 he made a rare visit to Kenya, attending the 50th anniversary of the Kenya Amateur Athletics Association (today Athletics Kenya).

== Retirement and death ==
Antao died on 6 September 2011, following a battle with cancer. He was buried in a grave in Hither Green Cemetery, Lewisham.
