= Ian Binnie (runner) =

Scottish runner

Personal information
- Nationality: British (Scottish)
- Born: 15 July 1929
- Died: 26 July 2007 (aged 78) Glasgow, Scotland

Sport
- Sport: Athletics
- Event: Long-distance
- Club: Victoria Park AAC, Glasgow

Ian Binnie (15 July 1929 - 26 July 2007) was a long-distance runner from Scotland who participated at two British Empire and Commonwealth Games (now Commonwealth Games) and was a seven-times Scottish champion.

== Biography ==
In 1952, Binnie became the youngest winner of the Scottish 6 miles title and between 1953 and 1955 he won three consecutive Scottish AAA title doubles after securing wins over both the 3 and 6 miles.

A member of the Victoria Park AAC of Glasgow, he helped the club win th eteam title at the English National Cross Country Championships in 1952. He also finished third at the 1953 AAA Championships behind Gordon Pirie, who broke the world record in the race.

He represented the Scottish team at the 1954 British Empire and Commonwealth Games in Vancouver, Canada, where he participated in the 3 and 6 miles events.

After the Games, Binnie went on to win his seventh Scottish Championship at New Meadowbank, Edinburgh, claiming the 6 miles race for the fourth successive year.

He would also represent the 1958 Scottish team at the 1958 British Empire and Commonwealth Games in Cardiff.
