= Sarawak at the 1962 British Empire and Commonwealth Games =

- CGF code: SAR
- CGA: Sarawak Sports Olympic Committee

in Perth, Western Australia
- Competitors: 5 in 1 sport
- Flag bearers: Opening: Closing:
- Medals: Gold 0 Silver 0 Bronze 0 Total 0

British Empire and Commonwealth Games appearances
- 1958; 1962

Other related appearances
- Malaysia (1966–pres.)

The Crown Colony of Sarawak competed at the 1962 British Empire and Commonwealth Games in Perth, Western Australia, from 22 November to 1 December 1962.

== Athletics ==
Men
Track events

Athlete	Event	Round 1		Round 2		Semifinal		Final	
Athlete	Event	Result	Rank	Result	Rank	Result	Rank	Result	Rank
William Chai Ah-Lim	100 yd	10.3	4 Q	10.5	6	did not advance			
Joseph Lee Gut-Hing	100 yd	10.0	4 Q	10.5	5	did not advance			
William Lee	100 yd	10.4	4 Q	10.7	6	did not advance			
William Chai Ah-Lim	220 yd	23.7	6	did not advance					
Joseph Lee Gut-Hing	220 yd	22.8	6	did not advance					
William Lee	220 yd	23.3	5	did not advance					
William Chai Ah-Lim	440 yd	DNS		—N/a		did not advance			
William Lee	440 yd	DNS		—N/a		did not advance			
Abdul Wahab Mohamed Salleh	880 yd	2:04.9	5	—N/a		did not advance			
Abdul Wahab Mohamed Salleh	1 mile	4:48.4	10	—N/a				did not advance	
Kuda Ditta	120 yd hurdles	DSQ		—N/a				did not advance	
Kuda Ditta	440 yd hurdles	55.7	6	—N/a				did not advance	
William Chai Ah-Lim; Kuda Ditta; Joseph Lee Gut-Hing; William Lee	4×110 yd relay	43.8	3 Q	—N/a				DSQ	

Field events

Athlete	Event	Final	
Athlete	Event	Distance	Rank
Joseph Lee Gut-Hing	Long jump	22 ft 5 1/2 in (6.85 m)	18
