= Gibraltar at the 1962 British Empire and Commonwealth Games =

- CGF code: GIB
- CGA: Commonwealth Games Association of Gibraltar

in Perth, Western Australia
- Competitors: 2 in 1 sport
- Flag bearers: Opening: Closing:
- Medals: Gold 0 Silver 0 Bronze 0 Total 0

British Empire and Commonwealth Games appearances
- 1958; 1962; 1966; 1970; 1974; 1978; 1982; 1986; 1990; 1994; 1998; 2002; 2006; 2010; 2014; 2018; 2022; 2026; 2030

Gibraltar competed at the 1962 British Empire and Commonwealth Games in Perth, Western Australia, from 22 November to 1 December 1962.

== Athletics ==
Men
Track events

Athlete	Event	Round 1		Round 2		Semifinal		Final	
Athlete	Event	Result	Rank	Result	Rank	Result	Rank	Result	Rank
Anthony Perera	100 yd	10.4	5	Did not advance					
Anthony Perera	220 yd	23.7	6	Did not advance					
Alistair Fyfe	3 miles	—N/a						15:47.0	14
Alistair Fyfe	6 miles	—N/a						DNF	
