= Sitiveni Moceidreke (athlete) =

Fijian sprinter (1937–2023)

Personal information
- Born: 1 June 1937 Yako, Nadroga-Navosa, Colony of Fiji, British Empire
- Died: November 2023 (aged 86)

Sport
- Country: Fiji
- Sport: Sprinting
- Event: 100 metres

Sitiveni Moceidreke (1 June 1937 – November 2023) was a Fijian sprinter. He competed in the men's 100 metres and men's 200 metres at the 1960 Summer Olympics. Moceidreke was eliminated in the quarter-finals of the 100 yards as well as of the 220 yards at the 1962 British Empire and Commonwealth Games. Moceidreke died in November 2023, at the age of 86.
