= Isle of Man at the 1962 British Empire and Commonwealth Games =

- Flag of the Isle of Man
- CGF code: IOM
- CGA: Commonwealth Games Association of the Isle of Man
- Website: cga.im

in Perth, Western Australia
- Flag bearers: Opening: Closing:
- Medals: Gold 0 Silver 0 Bronze 0 Total 0

British Empire and Commonwealth Games appearances
- 1958; 1962; 1966; 1970; 1974; 1978; 1982; 1986; 1990; 1994; 1998; 2002; 2006; 2010; 2014; 2018; 2022; 2026; 2030

The Isle of Man competed at the 1962 British Empire and Commonwealth Games in Perth, Western Australia, from 22 November to 1 December 1962.

== Athletics ==
Men
Track events

Athlete	Event	Round 1		Round 2		Semifinal		Final	
Athlete	Event	Result	Rank	Result	Rank	Result	Rank	Result	Rank
Brian Whitehead	100 yd	11.0	6	did not advance					
Brian Whitehead	220 yd	24.4	7	did not advance					
Peter Harraghy	440 yd	56.1	4	did not advance					
Peter Harraghy	880 yd	2:02.8	5	—N/a		did not advance			
Colin McLachlan	880 yd	2:00.0	5	—N/a		did not advance			
Colin McLachlan	440 yd hurdles	4:29.2	7	—N/a				did not advance	
