= Dave Stevenson =

Scottish athlete

David Stevenson
Personal information
- Full name: David Deas Stevenson
- Born: 28 November 1941 (age 84) Hawick, Scotland

Sport
- Country: Great Britain; Scotland
- Sport: Athletics
- Event: Pole vault
- Club: Edinburgh Southern Harriers

David Deas Stevenson CBE DL (born 28 November 1941) is a Scottish former athlete. He competed for Great Britain in the men's pole vault at the 1964 Summer Olympics, where he placed 20th. He was also a successful businessman, serving as managing director of Edinburgh Woollen Mill from 1970 to 1997.

== Athletics career ==
In addition to the Olympics (where he cleared three heights with no fails but could not achieve the qualifying mark for the final, 4.60m, from his three attempts), Stevenson also took part in the Commonwealth Games in 1962 (10th place), 1966 (4th place, matching the height of the bronze medallist) and 1970 (9th place).

At local level, he competed for Edinburgh University and Edinburgh Southern Harriers and won the Scottish Athletics Championships eight years out of nine between 1962 and 1970, claimed the gold medal at the 1965 AAA Indoor Championships (plus four silvers from other years), and two bronze at the AAA Championships. While at university, he had also challenged for the Scottish title in the long jump and triple jump.

== Business and personal life ==
Raised in Langholm, Dumfriesshire and a graduate of the University of Edinburgh Business School in 1962, he joined the textiles firm founded by his father Andrew in the 1930s and successfully expanded it as the Edinburgh Woollen Mill clothing retail company, with a catalyst for growth coming from the supply of the Scotland team's tartan uniforms at their 'home' 1970 British Commonwealth Games in Edinburgh, at which he was also a competing athlete. The company absorbed several others across Scotland to diversify its product line, and had almost 200 stores before being sold in 1997 for £69 million. He retained an interest in business with the Ashleybank Investments company which had shares in Schuh and Dobbies among others, and also set up a charitable organisation, the Stevenson Foundation, sponsoring local sports clubs and other civic causes. The Woollen Mill (in reality Stevenson's close family) owned several National Hunt racehorses, with Gordon W. Richards as trainer. His Irish son-in-law Ger Lyons is also a successful racehorse trainer, with his own daughter Kerri among his staff, while Ian Stark, Scottish Olympic medallist in Eventing, has credited Stevenson for his long-term support.

He was made a Commander of the British Empire in the 1988 New Year Honours. In 2012, Stevenson was made an Honorary Freeman of Dumfries and Galloway for "his involvement in bringing national recognition to the town [of Langholm], his generosity of spirit, and the time he has devoted to his local community". He was a baton-bearer for the 2014 Commonwealth Games held in Glasgow. At that time he was also Deputy Lord-Lieutenant for Dumfries.

His wife Alix Jamieson was a fellow competitor in the 1964 Olympics in the long jump event; they have two children and four grandchildren. His brother Neil was a top-level rugby union player with Langholm RFC in the era before professionalism in the sport, also working in the family business.
