= John Owiti =

Kenyan sprinter

Personal information
- Full name: John Owiti
- Nationality: Kenyan
- Born: 1942 (age 83–84)

Sport
- Country: Kenya
- Sport: Athletics
- Events: 100 metres; 200 metres
Medal record
Men's athletics
Representing Kenya
All-Africa Games
Silver medal – second place	1965 Brazzaville	100 m

John Owiti is a retired Kenyan sprinter.

Owiti competed for Kenya in the 1962 British Empire and Commonwealth Games in Perth finishing second in first round heat in the 100 yards with a time 9.8 seconds. In the second round, Owiti posted the slightly slower time of 10.2 seconds and finished fourth in his heat. In the 220 yards, Owiti again did not advance to the semi-finals after covering the distance in 22.4 seconds in both the first and second rounds. The same result was achieved in the 100 metres at the 1964 Summer Olympics in Mexico City where Owiti finished both of the heats in 10.6 seconds. The following year at the 1965 All-Africa Games in Brazzaville, Owiti achieved the silver medal in the 100 metres for finishing second in the final in 10.5 seconds behind the Ivoirian Gaoussou Koné.
