= Lynn Eves =

Canadian sprinter (1942–2023)

Personal information
- Nationality: Canadian
- Born: 12 March 1942 Victoria, British Columbia, Canada
- Died: 2 October 2023 (aged 81) San Tan Valley, Arizona, U.S.

Sport
- Sport: Sprinting
- Event: 100 metres

Lynn Eves (12 March 1942 – 2 October 2023) was a Canadian sprinter. He competed in the men's 100 metres at the 1960 Summer Olympics.

Eves competed for the Oregon State Beavers track and field team in the NCAA.

He was eliminated in the semi-finals of the 220 yards and in the quarter-finals of the 100 yards of the 1962 British Empire and Commonwealth Games. And he finished sixth with the 4×440 yards relay team (with Don Bertoia, George Shepherd, and Bill Crothers) at the 1962 British Empire and Commonwealth Games. Eves died on 2 October 2023, at the age of 81.
