= Victoria Park City Of Glasgow =

Scottish athletics club

- Founded: 4 April 1930
- Ground: Scotstoun Stadium
- Location: Danes Drive, Glasgow G14 9HD
- Coordinates: 55.881434°N 4.342146°W
- Website: official website

Victoria Park City Of Glasgow full name Victoria Park City Of Glasgow Athletics Club is a Scottish athletics club based in Glasgow, Scotland. The club is based primarily at the Scotstoun Stadium on Danes Drive.

== History ==
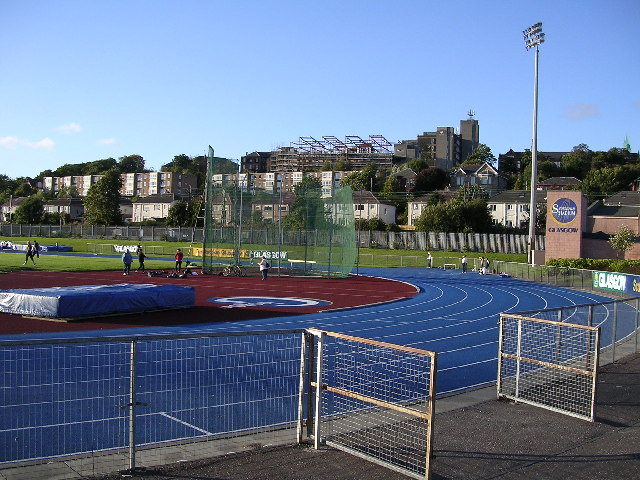
The track and throwing circle in 2013

The club was founded as the Victoria Park Amateur Athletic Club (VPAAC) on 4 April 1930 at the Unionist Rooms in Clydeview Place. The honorary president was James Crawford and the president was Peter Morrison.

Winter runs were held on Tuesdays and Thursdays and during the Summer training took place at Scotstoun Showground (the modern day site of the stadium) on Tuesdays and Thursdays.

The first significant athlete attached to the club was Sam Beattie who won the 1939 Scottish AAA National Championships.

During the 1950s the club was regarded as the leading club in Scotland.

The club's first Olympian was Alan Paterson in the high jump event at the 1948 Summer Olympics in London.

In 2007, the VPAAC merged with City Of Glasgow Athletic Club to form the Victoria Park City Of Glasgow AC.

== Notable athletes ==
=== Olympians ===
Athlete	Club	Events	Games	Medals/Ref
(United States) Alex Breckenridge	VPAAC	marathon	1960	
Crawford Fairbrother	VPAAC	high jump	1960	
Willie Jack	VPAAC	100m, 4x100m	1952	
Alan Paterson	VPAAC	high jump	1948, 1952	

- Scottish unless stated

=== Commonwealth Games ===
Athlete	Club	Events	Games	Medals/Ref
Andrew Forbes	VPAAC	1/3/6 miles	1950	Silver medal
Alan Paterson	VPAAC	High jump	1950	Silver medal
Ian Binnie	VPAAC	3/6 miles	1954, 1958	
Jim Hamilton	VPAAC	880y	1954	
Allan Dunbar	VPAAC	100y	1958	
Crawford Fairbrother	VPAAC	high jump	1958, 1962	
John MacIsaac	VPAAC	440y, 4x400	1958	
Michael Hildrey	VPAAC	100y, 220y	1962	
Susan Scott	City of Glasgow AC	800m	2002, 2006	
