= James Odongo (athlete) =

Ugandan sprinter

Personal information
- Nationality: Ugandan
- Born: 4 December 1944 (age 81)

Sport
- Sport: Sprinting
- Event: 100 metres

James Odongo Oduka (born 4 December 1944) is a Ugandan sprinter. He competed in the men's 100 metres at the 1964 Summer Olympics.
