= Bob Lay =

Australian sprinter (1944–2022)

Bob Lay AM
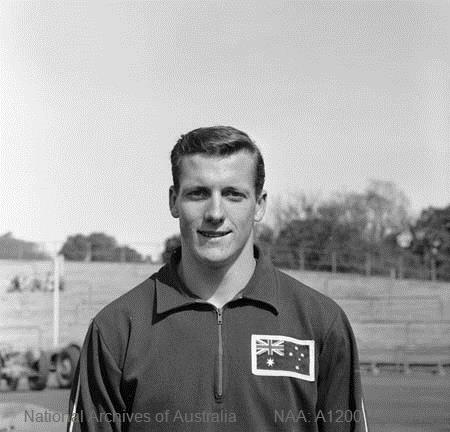
- Lay in 1964

Personal information
- Nationality: Australian
- Born: Robert William Lay; 20 March 1944 Glebe, New South Wales, Australia
- Died: 5 August 2022 (aged 78) Officer, Victoria, Australia

Sport
- Sport: Sprinting
- Events: 100 metres, 100 yards, 200 yards, 4 x 110 yards and 4 X 100 metres

Robert William Lay AM (20 March 1944 – 5 August 2022) was an Australian sprinter. He was the three time Australian 100 yards champion. Lay was regarded as the fastest man in Australia for multiple years. He is known for competing in the men's 100 metres at the 1964 Summer Olympics and his community work.

== Biography ==
Lay grew up in the suburb of Glebe in Sydney and as a youth played rugby, competing in first grade for Randwick Rugby Club. His career there included a premiership, and he also represented New South Wales, twice.

He joined Western Suburbs Amateur Athletics Club in 1960 at the age of 16. Two years later, at the age of 18, Lay represented Australia in three events at the 1962 British Empire and Commonwealth Games held in Perth. He competed in the 100 yards, 200 yards, and 4 X 110 yards relay. In 1964, he represented Australia in the 100 metres at the Tokyo Olympics, making the semi-final.

Lay held multiple records and titles over his athletic career, including the national record for the 100 yards at 9.2 seconds.

He was also a member of the 4 X 100-yard relay team that broke the world record in 1964. A plaque acknowledging this is in the pavement surrounding the warmup track at the Homebush stadium where the Sydney 2000 Olympics were held.

Lay retired at the end of 1968. He was Australian champion for the 100 yards in 1963, 1964 and 1965. In addition, he was the New South Wales 100 yards champion in 1963, 1964, 1965, 1967, and 1968, and the NSW 200 yards champion in 1963, 1964, 1966, 1967, and 1968.

After retiring from competition, Lay began his work helping the community. This career spanned 50 years, working as an executive in both sporting and business organisations.

He volunteered as a firefighter for the Glenbrook/Lapstone fire brigade in the Blue Mountains, where he helped put out the 1968 fires that burned parts of the Mountains.

In December 1968, Lay had a son, Graeme, with wife Helen.

In 1969, Lay and his family moved to Darwin, where he co-founded Little Athletics, was on the YMCA board, became President and coach of the Darwin Athletics Club and member of the Jaycees Community Group. During his few years in Darwin, Lay and wife Helen also had to more sons, Darren and Andrew.

In 1973, the family moved to Warrnambool, where Lay resurrected the Warrnambool Athletic Club, serving as both president and coach.

In 1975, he moved to Melbourne, where Lay began working for Adidas as an executive, becoming National Promotions Manager, handling athlete sponsorship.

During his time in Melbourne, Lay volunteered as President for Lyndale little athletics club, Dandenong Athletics Club, Springvale Athletics Club, and North Dandenong Junior Football Club.

After ending his career at Adidas, he spent 9 years with the Victorian Olympic Council as the General Manager organising fundraising events for the team.

Lay was also elected to the Board of Athletics Victoria where he served a total of 9 years including 6 as Vice President.

In 1995, Lay was elected onto the committee of Athletics International and in 1996 became President at the request of John Landy. He was a member of the Victorian Olympian’s Club and the Executive director of the Victorian Olympic Committee (VOC) where he was awarded life membership.

Lay was awarded the Australian Sports Medal in 2000 and the Centenary Medal in 2001.

Lays the moved to the General Manager position at The Sport Australia Hall of Fame in 2005. He helped organise its annual dinner. Lay served as general manager of the Sport Australia Hall of Fame for 11 years, before retiring in December 2016.

Whilst working for The Sport Australia Hall of Fame, Lay continued to work for Athletics International focusing on support for junior and emerging athletes. This was done through monetary grants and organising support.

In 2006, Lay was the attaché for the island nation of Saint Helena, during the Melbourne Commonwealth Games. He carried their flag during the closing ceremony.

Lay was also appointed a Member of the Order of Australia in the 2015 Australia Day Honours for his for service to sports administration and the community.

Lay died in Officer on 5 August 2022, due to a case of pulmonary fibrosis.
