= Bahamas at the 1958 British Empire and Commonwealth Games =

Sporting event delegation

The Bahamas competed at the 1958 British Empire and Commonwealth Games in Cardiff. It won one gold and one silver medal.

The colony was represented by one competitor, Tommy Robinson, who won gold in the 200 yards dash and silver in the 100 yards dash. Robinson set a British All-Comers record and an Empire Games record when he won his first round round heat in the 100 yards in 9.5 seconds. He set a second Empire Games record when he won the 220 yards in 20.9 seconds.

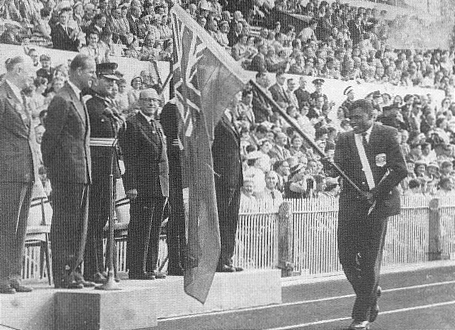
Tommy Robinson pictured during the 1958 British Empire Games in Cardiff, Wales.
