= Tony Blue =

Australian middle-distance runner (1936–2020)

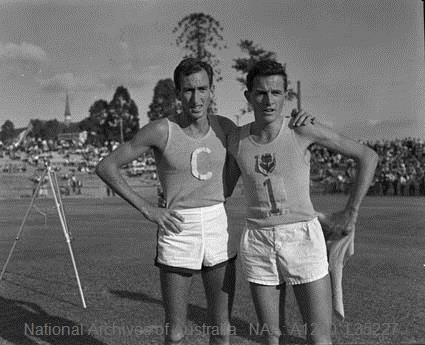
- Blue (right) with Herb Elliott in 1960

Personal information
- Nationality: Australian
- Born: Anthony Arthur Crampton Blue; 4 February 1936
- Died: 1 October 2020 (aged 84)

Sport
- Sport: Middle-distance running
- Event: 800 metres

Anthony Arthur Crampton Blue (4 February 1936 – 1 October 2020) was an Australian middle-distance runner. He competed in the 800 metres at the 1960 Summer Olympics and the 1964 Summer Olympics. Blue won a bronze medal in the 880 yards at the 1962 British Empire and Commonwealth Games.
