= Michael Okantey =

Ghanaian sprinter (born 1939)

Medal record

Men's athletics

Representing Ghana

British Empire and Commonwealth Games
Silver medal – second place	1962 Perth	4 × 110 yd relay

Michael Okantey (born 30 October 1939) is a Ghanaian former sprinter who competed in the 1960 Summer Olympics and in the 1964 Summer Olympics.
