= Terry Sullivan (athlete) =

Zimbabwean middle-distance runner (1935–2019)

Personal information
- Nationality: Zimbabwean
- Born: 7 September 1935 Johannesburg, South Africa
- Died: 7 May 2019 (aged 83) Johannesburg, South Africa

Sport
- Sport: Middle-distance running
- Event(s): 800 metres, 1500 metres

Terrence Allman Sullivan (7 September 1935 – 7 May 2019) was a South African middle-distance runner. He competed in the men's 1500 metres and 800 metres at the 1960 Summer Olympics, representing Rhodesia. He finished third in the 1962 British Empire and Commonwealth Games 1 mile competing for Rhodesia and Nyasaland. He also participated in the 880 yards in 1962, but was eliminated in the semi-finals. At the 1958 British Empire and Commonwealth Games, representing Southern Rhodesia, he finished fourth in the 880 yards and was eliminated in the heats of the 1 mile. Sullivan died in Johannesburg on 7 May 2019, at the age of 83.
