= Edwin Roberts =

Edwin or Edwyn Roberts may refer to:

- Edwin A. Roberts Jr. (born 1932), American journalist
- Edwin E. Roberts (1870–1933), American politician and lawyer
- Edwyn Roberts, singer at Eurovision
- Edwyn Cynrig Roberts (1838–1893), Welsh pioneer
- Edwin Roberts (sprinter) (born 1941), Trinidad former athlete

== See also ==
- Ed Roberts, multiple people
