= Dennis Tipping =

Australian sprinter (1939–2025)

Dennis Robert Tipping (20 September 1939 – 4 May 2025) was an Australian sprinter who competed in the 1960 Summer Olympics. Tipping died on 4 May 2025, at the age of 85.
