= Jeffery Smith (athlete) =

Zambian sprinter

Personal information
- Nationality: Northern Rhodesian
- Born: 11 June 1943 (age 83)

Sport
- Sport: Sprinting
- Event: 100 metres

Jeffery Itzen Smith (born 11 June 1943) is a former sprinter. Representing Northern Rhodesia, he competed in the men's 100 metres and men's 200 metres at the 1964 Summer Olympics. Representing Rhodesia and Nyasaland at the 1962 British Empire and Commonwealth Games, Smith finished fourth in the 4 × 110 yards relay (with Johan Du Preez, Danie Burger, and Roy Collins), fifth in the 220 yards, and was eliminated in the quarter-finals of the 100 yards in Perth.
