= Peter Radford =

British sprinter (born 1939)

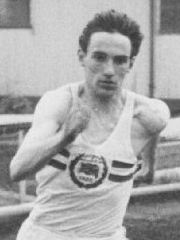
- Radford in 1960

Personal information
- Full name: Peter Frank Radford
- Nationality: British (English)
- Born: 20 September 1939 (age 87) Walsall, England
- Height: 1.80 m (5 ft 11 in)
- Weight: 61 kg (134 lb)

Sport
- Sport: Athletics
- Events: 100 metres, 200 metres
- Club: Birchfield Harriers

Achievements and titles
- Personal bests: 100 m – 10.29 (1958); 200 m – 20.4 (1960)
Medal record
Men's athletics
Representing Great Britain
Olympic Games
Bronze medal – third place	1960 Rome	100 metres
Bronze medal – third place	1960 Rome	4×100 m relay
European Championships
Silver medal – second place	1958 Stockholm	4×100 m relay
Bronze medal – third place	1958 Stockholm	100 metres
Representing England
British Empire and Commonwealth Games
Gold medal – first place	1958 Cardiff	4×110 yd relay
Gold medal – first place	1962 Perth	4×110 yd relay

Peter Frank Radford (born 20 September 1939) is a former British sprinter, who competed at 100 and 200 metres (and 100 and 220 yards), broke world records, and won Olympic medals, despite having been seriously ill as a child due to a hole in his kidney.

== Biography ==
=== Running ===
Radford took up competitive running at the age of 12, soon joining Birchfield Harriers, where he was coached by Bill Marlow, and won the English Schools intermediate 100 yard title in 1955 and seniors 100 yards in 1957. He attended Tettenhall College. At the age of 18 at the British Empire and Commonwealth Games in Cardiff in July 1958, he came fourth at 100 yards, was a semi-finalist in the 220 yards, and won a sprint relay gold medal with the England 4×110 yards relay team.

In August of that year he competed in the European Championships where he won a bronze medal in the 100 metres and a silver medal as part of the British 4×100 metres relay team. In September of the same year he equalled the European record of 20.8 seconds for 200m in Paris. On 28 May 1960, he broke the world record for 220 yards with a time of 20.5 seconds, at the Staffordshire Championships in Wolverhampton. The time and record were also accepted for the 200 metre distance.

Radford represented Great Britain in the 100 and 200 metres at the 1960 Summer Olympics held in Rome, Italy, where he won the bronze medal at 100 metres. He then teamed up with fellow British athletes David Jones, David Segal and Nick Whitehead to finish third in the 4×100 metres relay. The USA finished first in that race but were disqualified for a baton exchange outside the permitted zone which then elevated Britain to third. Videos show that Radford's baton pass to David Jones at the first changeover was also outside the permitted zone so the Britons were fortunate not to be disqualified as well.

Radford won a second British Empire and Commonwealth Games Gold medal in Perth, Western Australia in 1962 as a member of the England 4×110 yards relay team, and represented Britain as a quarter-finalist at both 100m and 200m at the 1964 Tokyo Olympics, albeit as a late selection. He was eliminated from the 100m in the second-round heats, but ran the first leg of the relay, which broke the UK record. Following Tokyo, he retired from competition, due to a recurring knee ligament problem. At that time, and for at least another two decades, he was the most successful sprinter in Birchfield Harriers' history.

Radford was twice British 100 yards champion after winning the British AAA Championships title at the 1959 AAA Championships and 1960 AAA Championships.

=== Administrator and writer ===
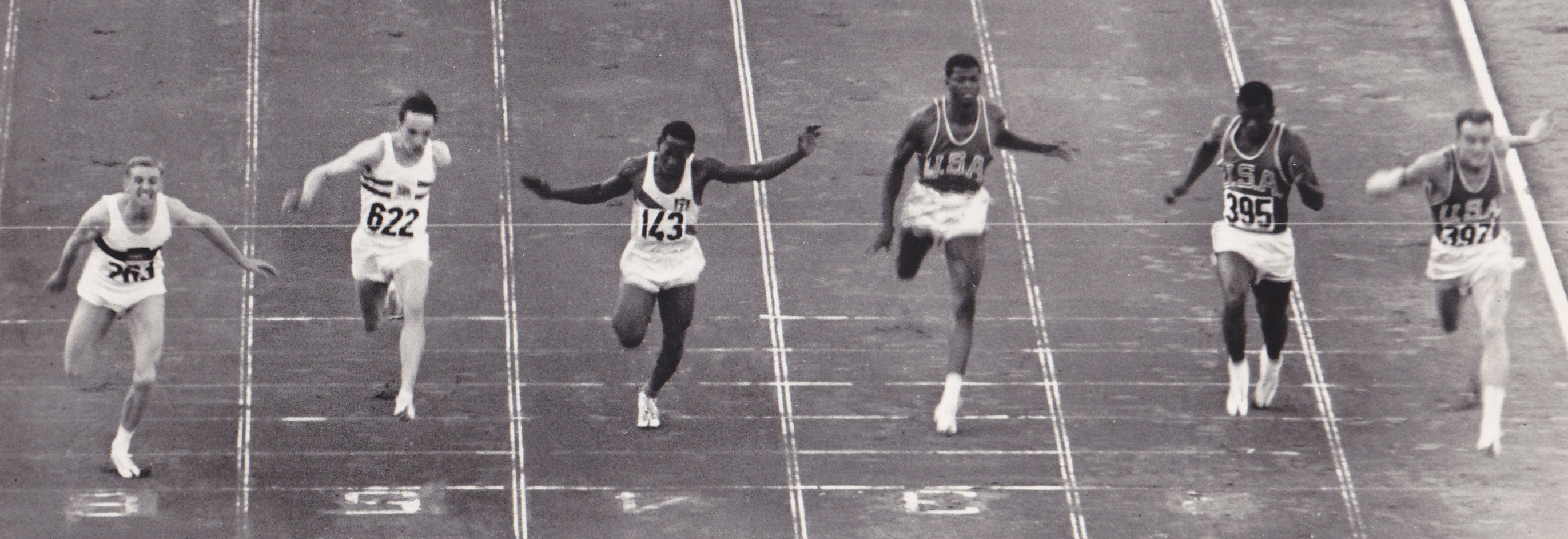
1960 Olympics, 100 m final, Radford is 2nd from left

For 12 years from 1965, he lived and worked in Canada and the USA.

He is a former Chairman of UK Athletics and chairman (in 1993) and 'executive between chairman' (1994–97) of its predecessor, the British Athletics Federation. He was founder professor of the chair of the department of physical education and sports science at Glasgow University, and is currently Professor of Sport at Brunel University. In autumn 2018, Radford was in-residence as a short-term fellow at the Folger Library's Folger Institute in Washington, DC, to study and present on "the corporeal and sporting early modern woman."

Radford wrote a biography of the 19th-century Scottish athlete Robert Barclay Allardice, entitled The celebrated Captain Barclay: sport, money and fame in Regency Britain and published in 2001.

A photograph of him running against Italy, three months before the 1960 Olympics, is featured on the cover of the 2011/2012 BT telephone directory, The Phone Book, for Birmingham North, which covers the home of Birchfield Harriers, Perry Barr Stadium.

Records
Preceded by (West Germany) Manfred Germar	European Record Holder Men's 200m 14 September 1958 - 20 September 1958	Succeeded by (West Germany) Manfred Germar
Preceded by (West Germany) Manfred Germar	European Record Holder Men's 200m 28 May 1960 - 2 September 1960	Succeeded by (Italy) Livio Berruti
