= Johan Du Preez =

Rhodesian (Zimbabwean) sprinter

Johan du Preez
Personal information
- Nationality: Rhodesian
- Born: 8 July 1936 (age 89)

Sport
- Sport: Sprinting
- Event: 100 metres

Johan du Preez (born 8 July 1936) is a former sprinter. He competed for Rhodesia in the men's 100 metres and men's 200 metres at the 1964 Summer Olympics. Representing Rhodesia and Nyasaland, he won a bronze medal in the 220 yards at the 1962 British Empire and Commonwealth Games. In 1962, he also finished fourth in the 4 × 110 yards relay (with Jeffery Smith, Danie Burger, and Roy Collins) and was eliminated in the quarter-finals of the 100 yards in Perth.
