= Allen Crawley =

Australian long & triple jumper (born 1941)

Medal record

Men's athletics

Representing Australia

British Empire and Commonwealth Games
Bronze medal – third place	1966 Kingston	4×110 yards relay

Allen David Crawley (born 15 May 1941 in Tasmania) is a former long jumper, triple jumper and sprinter who competed in the 1968 Summer Olympics, finishing sixth in the long jump, representing Australia.

Crawley won a bronze medal for Australia at the 1966 British Empire and Commonwealth Games in the 4×110 yards relay. Previously, he represented Papua and New Guinea at the 1962 British Empire and Commonwealth Games, competing in the 100 yards, the 4×110 yards relay, the long jump and the triple jump. He was educated at the Anglican Church Grammar School.
