= Danie Burger =

South African hurdler (1933–1990)

Personal information
- Nationality: South African citizenship
- Born: 25 March 1933 Lichtenburg, Transvaal, Union of South Africa
- Died: 17 January 1990 (aged 56) Johannesburg, Transvaal, South Africa
- Height: 183 cm (6 ft 0 in)
- Weight: 75 kg (165 lb)

Sport
- Sport: Track and field
- Events: 110 metres hurdles, pole vault

Michael Daniel “Danie” Burger (25 March 1933 – 17 January 1990) was a South African hurdler. He competed in the men's 110 metres hurdles at the 1956 Summer Olympics. He won a silver medal in the pole vault at the 1962 British Empire and Commonwealth Games, representing Rhodesia and Nyasaland. He also finished fourth in the 4 × 110 yards relay (with Jeffery Smith, Johan Du Preez, and Roy Collins) at the 1962 Games.

Burger won the decathlon at the British 1961 AAA Championships and finished third behind Salvatore Morale in the 220 yards hurdles event at the same Championships.
