= Kiptalam Keter =

Kenyan sprinter

Personal information
- Nationality: Kenyan
- Born: 1932
- Died: 3 December 2013 (aged 80–81)

Sport
- Sport: Sprinting
- Event: 4 × 400 metres relay

Aram Kiptalam Keter (1932 – 3 December 2013) was a Kenyan sprinter. He competed in the men's 4 × 400 metres relay at the 1956 Summer Olympics in Melbourne, Australia. He also finished sixth in the men's 4 x 440 yards relay in the 1958 British Empire and Commonwealth Games, in Cardiff, Wales.
