= 1962 British Empire and Commonwealth Games =

Multi-sport event in Perth, Western Australia

VII British Empire and Commonwealth Games
- Host city: Perth, Australia
- Nations: 35
- Athletes: 863
- Events: 104
- Opening: 22 November 1962
- Closing: 1 December 1962
- Opened by: Prince Philip, Duke of Edinburgh
- Athlete's Oath: Ivan Lund
- Main venue: Perry Lakes Stadium

The 1962 British Empire and Commonwealth Games were held in Perth, Western Australia, from 22 November to 1 December 1962. Athletic events were held at Perry Lakes Stadium in the suburb of Floreat and swimming events at Beatty Park in North Perth. It was held after the 1962 Commonwealth Paraplegic Games for wheelchair athletes.

== Venues ==
Most venues other than the specifically constructed Lake Monger Velodrome, Beatty Park, and Perry Lakes Stadium, were existing facilities.

- Athletics, opening and closing ceremonies – Perry Lakes Stadium, Floreat
- Boxing – Perry Lakes Basketball Stadium, Floreat
- Cycling (track) – Lake Monger Velodrome, Leederville
- Cycling (road) – Kings Park, Perth
- Fencing – Victoria Park Army Drill Hall, Victoria Park
- Lawn bowls – Dalkeith Nedlands Bowling Club, Dalkeith
- Rowing – Canning River, Applecross
- Swimming – Beatty Park, Leederville
- Weightlifting – South Perth City Hall, South Perth
- Wrestling – Royal King's Park Tennis Club, Perth
- Athletes' Village – Commonwealth Games Village, City Beach

== Participating teams ==
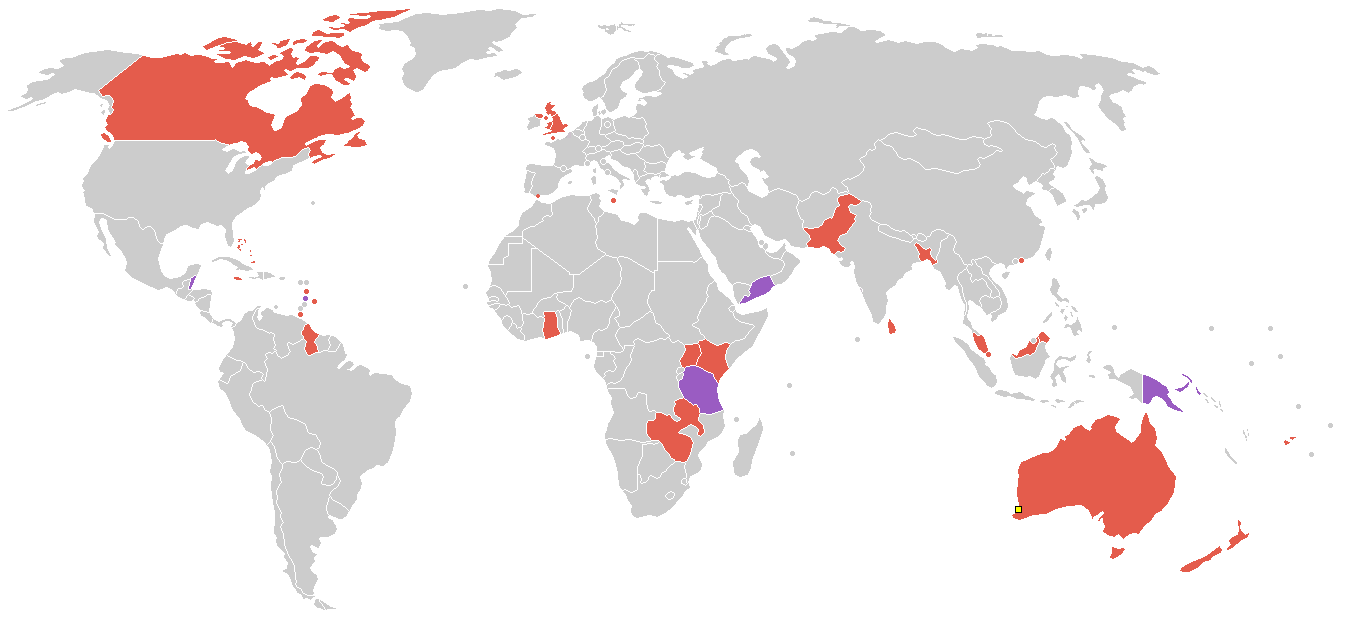
Countries that participated

35 teams were represented at the 1962 British Empire and Commonwealth Games.
(Teams competing for the first time are shown in bold).

- **Aden**—first appearance
- Australia **(host)**
- Bahamas
- Barbados
- British Guiana
- **British Honduras**—first appearance
- Canada
- Ceylon
- Dominica
- England
- Fiji
- Ghana
- Gibraltar
- Hong Kong
- Isle of Man
- Jamaica
- Jersey
- Kenya
- Malaya
- Malta
- Mauritius
- New Zealand
- North Borneo
- Northern Ireland
- Pakistan
- **Papua and New Guinea**—first appearance
- **Rhodesia and Nyasaland**—first appearance
- Sarawak
- Scotland
- Singapore
- **Saint Lucia**—first appearance
- **Tanganyika**—first appearance
- Trinidad and Tobago
- Uganda
- Wales

== Medals by country ==
Note: The medals used at these Games were the first to have a neck chain. All previous games had their medals in presentation boxes.

* Host nation (Australia)

Medals by nation, ranked and sortable, with totals
Rank	Nation	Gold	Silver	Bronze	Total
1	Australia*	38	36	31	105
2	England	29	22	27	78
3	New Zealand	10	12	10	32
4	Pakistan	8	1	0	9
5	Canada	4	12	15	31
6	Scotland	4	7	3	14
7	Ghana	3	5	1	9
8	Jamaica	3	1	1	5
9	Kenya	2	2	1	5
10	Singapore	2	0	0	2
11	Uganda	1	1	4	6
12	Rhodesia and Nyasaland	0	2	5	7
13	Wales	0	2	4	6
14	Bahamas	0	1	0	1
15	Fiji	0	0	2	2
15	Trinidad and Tobago	0	0	2	2
17	Barbados	0	0	1	1
17	British Guiana	0	0	1	1
17	Jersey	0	0	1	1
17	Malaysia	0	0	1	1
17	Northern Ireland	0	0	1	1
17	Papua and New Guinea	0	0	1	1
Totals (22 entries)		**104**	**104**	**112**	**320**

== Sports ==
- Aquatics ()
  - Diving ()
  - Swimming ()
- Athletics ()
- Boxing ()
- Cycling ()
- Fencing ()
- Lawn bowls ()
- Rowing ()
- Weightlifting ()
- Wrestling ()

== See also ==
- 1962 Commonwealth Paraplegic Games

Preceded by **Cardiff**	**British Empire and Commonwealth Games**; Perth; **VII British Empire and Commonwealth Games**	Succeeded by **Kingston**
