= Athletics at the 1962 British Empire and Commonwealth Games – Men's marathon =

Men's marathon at the 1962 British Empire and Commonwealth Games
- Venue: Perry Lakes Stadium
- Date: 29 November 1962
- Competitors: 21 from 9 nations
- Winning time: 2:21:17.0 GR

Medalists
gold medal	Brian Kilby	England
silver medal	Dave Power	Australia
bronze medal	Rod Bonella	Australia

The men's marathon at the 1962 British Empire and Commonwealth Games as part of the athletics programme was held at the Perry Lakes Stadium on Thursday 29 November 1962.

The event was won by the European champion, Englishman Brian Kilby in 2:21:17.0, setting a new Games record. Kilby won by 58.6 seconds ahead of the defending champion Australian Dave Power and another Australian Rod Bonella who won the bronze medal.

New Zealand's Barry Magee who finished fourth in the 6 mile event earlier in the meet, was ruled unfit to start the race due to blistered feet.

== Records ==
World record	Abebe Bikila (ETH)	2:15:16.2	Rome, Italy	10 September 1960
Commonwealth record				
Games record	Dave Power (AUS)	2:22:45.6	Cardiff, Wales	24 July 1958

The following records were established during the competition:

Date	Event	Name	Nationality	Time	Record
29 November	Final	Brian Kilby	England	2:21:17.0	GR

== Final ==
Rank	Name	Nationality	Time	Notes
1st place, gold medalist(s)	Brian Kilby	England	2:21:17.0	GR
2nd place, silver medalist(s)	Dave Power	Australia	2:22:15.4	
3rd place, bronze medalist(s)	Rod Bonella	Australia	2:24:07.0	
4	Keith Ollerenshaw	Australia	2:24:59	
5	Mel Batty	England	2:25:51	
6	John Stephen Akhwari	Tanganyika	2:28:39	
7	Jeff Julian	New Zealand	2:30:13	
8	Peter Wilkinson	England	2:30:51	
9	Martin Hyman	England	2:32:07	
10	Gul Muhammad	Pakistan	2:38:26	
11	Deogatius Rwabugwene	Uganda	2:42:28	
12	Gordon Dickson	Canada	2:44:17	
	Bruce Kidd	Canada		DNF
	Ian Sinfield	Australia		DNF
	Muhammad Yusaf	Pakistan		DNF
	Alastair Wood	Scotland		DNF
	Pascal Mfyomi	Tanganyika		DNF
	George Zebukire	Uganda		DNF
	Vinancio Okwera	Uganda		DNF
	John Merriman	Wales		DNF
	Barry Magee	New Zealand		DNS
