= Australia at the 1962 British Empire and Commonwealth Games =

- CG code: AUS
- CGA: Australian Commonwealth Games Association
- Website: commonwealthgames.org.au

in Perth, Western Australia
- Competitors: 208
- Flag bearers: Opening: Tony Madigan; Closing:
- Officials: 30
- Medals Ranked 1st: Gold 38 Silver 36 Bronze 31 Total 105

British Empire and Commonwealth Games appearances
- 1930; 1934; 1938; 1950; 1954; 1958; 1962; 1966; 1970; 1974; 1978; 1982; 1986; 1990; 1994; 1998; 2002; 2006; 2010; 2014; 2018; 2022; 2026; 2030

Australia hosted the 1962 British Empire and Commonwealth Games in Perth, Western Australia, from 22 November to 1 December 1962. It was Australia's seventh appearance at the Commonwealth Games, having competed at every Games since their inception in 1930.

Australia won medals in nine of the ten sports that it entered.

== Medallists ==
The following Australian competitors won medals at the games.

Medal	Name	Sport	Event	Date
Gold	Trevor Vincent	Athletics	Men's 3000 metres steeplechase	24 November
Gold	Percy Hobson	Athletics	Men's high jump	24 November
Gold	Alf Mitchell	Athletics	Men's javelin throw	24 November
Gold	Robyn Woodhouse	Athletics	Women's high jump	26 November
Gold	Ken Roche	Athletics	Men's 440 yards hurdles	26 November
Gold	Warwick Selvey	Athletics	Men's discus throw	26 November
Gold	Ian Tomlinson	Athletics	Men's triple jump	29 November
Gold	Trevor Bickle	Athletics	Men's pole vault	1 December
Gold	Dixie Willis	Athletics	Women's 880 yards	1 December
Gold	Pam Kilborn	Athletics	Women's 80 metres hurdles	1 December
Gold	Pam Kilborn	Athletics	Women's long jump	1 December
Gold	Glenys Beasley; Joyce Bennett; Brenda Cox; Betty Cuthbert	Athletics	Women's 4 × 110 yards relay	1 December
Gold	Jeff Dynevor	Boxing	Men's Bantamweight	
Gold	Tony Madigan	Boxing	Men's Light Heavyweight	
Gold	Peter Bartels	Cycling	Men's Time Trial	
Gold	Thomas Harrison	Cycling	Men's Sprint	
Gold	Maxwell Langshaw	Cycling	Men's Individual Pursuit	
Gold	Doug Adams	Cycling	Men's 10 Mile Scratch	
Gold	Susan Knight	Diving	Women's 3m Springboard	
Gold	Susan Knight	Diving	Women's 10m Platform	
Gold	Ivan Lund	Fencing	Men's Épée	
Gold	Charles Lehman David Palfreyman Dushan Stankovich Graeme McCall Ian Douglas Martin Tomanovits Paul Guest Terry Davies Walter Howell	Rowing	Men's Eights	
Gold	Murray Rose	Swimming	Men's 440 yd Freestyle	
Gold	Murray Rose	Swimming	Men's 1650 yd Freestyle	
Gold	Julian Carroll	Swimming	Men's 220 yd Backstroke	
Gold	Ian O'Brien	Swimming	Men's 110 yd Breaststroke	
Gold	Ian O'Brien	Swimming	Men's 220 yd Breaststroke	
Gold	Kevin Berry	Swimming	Men's 110 yd Butterfly	
Gold	Kevin Berry	Swimming	Men's 220 yd Butterfly	
Gold	Alex Alexander	Swimming	Men's 440 yd Individual Medley	
Gold	David Dickson Murray Rose Peter Doak Peter Phelps	Swimming	Men's 4×110 yd Freestyle Relay	
Gold	David Dickson Ian O'Brien Julian Carroll Kevin Berry	Swimming	Men's 4×110 yd Medley Relay	
Gold	Allan Wood Anthony Strahan Murray Rose Bob Windle	Swimming	Men's 4×220 yd Freestyle Relay	
Gold	Dawn Fraser	Swimming	Women's 110 yd Freestyle	
Gold	Dawn Fraser	Swimming	Women's 440 yd Freestyle	
Gold	Dawn Fraser Lynette Bell Robyn Thorn Ruth Everuss	Swimming	Women's 4×110 yd Freestyle Relay	
Gold	Dawn Fraser Linda McGill Marguerite Ruygrok Pamela Sergeant	Swimming	Women's 4×110 yd Medley Relay	
Gold	Arthur Shannos	Weightlifting	Men's Heavyweight	
Silver	Dave Power	Athletics	Men's 6 miles	24 November
Silver	Chilla Porter	Athletics	Men's high jump	24 November
Silver	Jean Roberts	Athletics	Women's shot put	24 November
Silver	Ron Clarke	Athletics	Men's 3 miles	26 November
Silver	Helen Frith	Athletics	Women's high jump	26 November
Silver	Dave Prince	Athletics	Men's 120 yards hurdles	29 November
Silver	Dave Power	Athletics	Men's marathon	29 November
Silver	John Baguley	Athletics	Men's triple jump	29 November
Silver	Joyce Bennett	Athletics	Women's 220 yards	29 November
Silver	Dick Leffler	Athletics	Men's hammer throw	1 December
Silver	Helen Frith	Athletics	Women's long jump	1 December
Silver	Rosslyn Williams	Athletics	Women's discus throw	1 December
Silver	Ian Chapman	Cycling	Men's Time Trial	
Silver	Richard Hine	Cycling	Men's Individual Pursuit	
Silver	Graham Deuble	Diving	Men's 10m Platform	
Silver	Brian McCowage; David McKenzie; Ivan Lund	Fencing	Men's Team Foil	
Silver	Ivan Lund; John Humphreys; Mike Diamond	Fencing	Men's Team Épée	
Silver	Johanna Winter	Fencing	Women's Foil	
Silver	David Ramage, Derek Norwood, David Caithness; David John, Phillip Sarah	Rowing	Men's Coxed Four	
Silver	Allan Wood	Swimming	Men's 440 yd Freestyle	
Silver	Bob Windle	Swimming	Men's 1650 yd Freestyle	
Silver	Julian Carroll	Swimming	Men's 110 yd Backstroke	
Silver	Tony Fingleton	Swimming	Men's 220 yd Backstroke	
Silver	William Burton	Swimming	Men's 110 yd Breaststroke	
Silver	William Burton	Swimming	Men's 220 yd Breaststroke	
Silver	Neville Hayes	Swimming	Men's 110 yd Butterfly	
Silver	Neville Hayes	Swimming	Men's 220 yd Butterfly	
Silver	John Oravainen	Swimming	Men's 440 yd Individual Medley	
Silver	Robyn Thorn	Swimming	Women's 110 yd Freestyle	
Silver	Ilsa Konrads	Swimming	Women's 440 yd Freestyle	
Silver	Pam Sergeant	Swimming	Women's 110 yd Backstroke	
Silver	Linda McGill	Swimming	Women's 440 yd Individual Medley	
Silver	Alan Oshyer	Weightlifting	Men's Lightweight	
Silver	Sid Marsh	Wrestling	Men's Lightweight	
Silver	Michael Benarik	Wrestling	Men's Middleweight	
Silver	Ray Mitchell	Wrestling	Men's Heavyweight	
Bronze	Michael Cleary	Athletics	Men's 100 yards	24 November
Bronze	Ron Blackney	Athletics	Men's 3000 metres steeplechase	24 November
Bronze	Nick Birks	Athletics	Men's javelin throw	24 November
Bronze	Tony Blue	Athletics	Men's 880 yards	26 November
Bronze	Brenda Cox	Athletics	Women's 100 yards	26 November
Bronze	Michele Mason	Athletics	Women's high jump	26 November
Bronze	Rod Bonella	Athletics	Men's marathon	29 November
Bronze	Margaret Burvill	Athletics	Women's 220 yards	29 November
Bronze	Anna Pazera	Athletics	Women's javelin throw	29 November
Bronze	Ross Filshie	Athletics	Men's pole vault	1 December
Bronze	Robert Brown	Athletics	Men's hammer throw	1 December
Bronze	Janet Knee	Athletics	Women's long jump	1 December
Bronze	Mary McDonald	Athletics	Women's discus throw	1 December
Bronze	Ted Stone	Boxing	Men's Featherweight	
Bronze	Graham Robinson	Boxing	Men's Heavyweight	
Bronze	Ian Browne	Cycling	Men's Sprint	
Bronze	Lorraine McArthur	Diving	Women's 3m Springboard	
Bronze	Patricia Plowman	Diving	Women's 10m Platform	
Bronze	Janet Hopner	Fencing	Women's Foil	
Bronze	Ian Tutty	Rowing	Men's Single Sculls	
Bronze	Barclay Wade Graeme Squires	Rowing	Men's Double Sculls	
Bronze	Rodger Ninham William Hatfield	Rowing	Men's Coxless Pairs	
Bronze	David Dickson	Swimming	Men's 110 yd Freestyle	
Bronze	Bob Windle	Swimming	Men's 440 yd Freestyle	
Bronze	Allan Wood	Swimming	Men's 1650 yd Freestyle	
Bronze	Wayne Vincent	Swimming	Men's 110 yd Backstroke	
Bronze	Brett Hill	Swimming	Men's 220 yd Butterfly	
Bronze	Pam Sargent	Swimming	Women's 220 yd Backstroke	
Bronze	Linda McGill	Swimming	Women's 110 yd Butterfly	
Bronze	Jennifer Corish	Swimming	Women's 440 yd Individual Medley	
Bronze	Jim Armstrong	Wrestling	Men's Light Heavyweight	

Medals by sport
Sport	1st place, gold medalist(s)	2nd place, silver medalist(s)	3rd place, bronze medalist(s)	
Swimming	15	13	8	36
Athletics	12	12	13	37
Cycling	4	2	1	7
Boxing	2	0	2	4
Diving	2	1	2	5
Weightlifting	1	1	0	2
Fencing	1	3	1	5
Rowing	1	1	3	5
Wrestling	0	3	1	4
Total	38	36	31	105

|}

== Athletics ==
Australian athletics selectors announced on 21 October 1962 a team of 78 athletes consisting of 54 men and 24 women.

Men
Track & road events

Athlete	Event	Round 1		Round 2		Semifinal		Final	
Athlete	Event	Result	Rank	Result	Rank	Result	Rank	Result	Rank
Michael Cleary	100 yd	9.4	1 Q	9.6	1 Q	9.7	2 Q	9.6	3rd place, bronze medalist(s)
Gary Holdsworth	100 yd	9.5	2 Q	9.7	1 Q	9.7	3 Q	9.7	4
Bob Lay	100 yd	9.6	3 Q	9.8	3	Did not advance			
Byron Williams	100 yd	9.8	2 Q	10.2	5	Did not advance			
Michael Cleary	220 yd	21.8	3 Q	22.0	2 Q	21.4	1 Q	22.0	5
Bob Lay	220 yd	21.7	1 Q	21.9	2 Q	21.6	4	Did not advance	
Peter Norman	220 yd	21.6	3 Q	22.0	3 Q	21.8	6	Did not advance	
Dennis Tipping	220 yd	22.0	4 Q	22.3	4	Did not advance			
John Randall	440 yd	48.7	4	—N/a		Did not advance			
Ken Roche	440 yd	48.4	1 Q	—N/a		47.9	3 Q	47.7	4
Peter Quiggan	440 yd	49.4	3	—N/a		Did not advance			
Brian Waters	440 yd	47.9	2 Q	—N/a		47.8	4	Did not advance	
Tony Blue	880 yd	1:52.0	2 Q	—N/a		1:50.7	2 Q	1:49.0	3rd place, bronze medalist(s)
Keith Wheeler	880 yd	1:52.8	2 Q	—N/a		1:51.3	4	Did not advance	
Tony Blue	1 mile	4:09.3	1 Q	—N/a				4:09.4	4
Pat Clohessy	1 mile	4:11.0	4	—N/a				Did not advance	
Gordon Noble	1 mile	4:11.3	4	—N/a				Did not advance	
Albie Thomas	1 mile	4:02.2	1 Q	—N/a				4:11.2	5
Ron Clarke	3 miles	—N/a						13:36.0	2nd place, silver medalist(s)
Pat Clohessy	3 miles	—N/a						13:42.0	7
Tony Cook	3 miles	—N/a						14:17.0	12
Albie Thomas	3 miles	—N/a						13:40.6	5
Ron Clarke	6 miles	—N/a						DNF	
Tony Cook	6 miles	—N/a						DNF	
Dave Power	6 miles	—N/a						28:34.0	2nd place, silver medalist(s)
Bob Vagg	6 miles	—N/a						30:10.0	12
Mick Daws	120 yd hurdles	14.5	1 Q	—N/a				14.9	5
Michael Devlin	120 yd hurdles	14.5	2 Q	—N/a				14.9	4
Gary Knoke	120 yd hurdles	14.6	3	—N/a				Did not advance	
Dave Prince	120 yd hurdles	14.2	2 Q	—N/a				14.4	2nd place, silver medalist(s)
Michael Devlin	440 yd hurdles	52.5	2 Q	—N/a				52.6	5
Gary Knoke	440 yd hurdles	52.1	2 Q	—N/a				52.5	4
Dave Prince	440 yd hurdles	53.7	4	—N/a				Did not advance	
Ken Roche	440 yd hurdles	52.3	1 Q	—N/a				51.5	1st place, gold medalist(s)
Ron Blackney	3000 m steeplechase	—N/a						9:00.6	3rd place, bronze medalist(s)
Ian Blackwood	3000 m steeplechase	—N/a						9:04:0	4
John Coyle	3000 m steeplechase	—N/a						9:15.0	7
Trevor Vincent	3000 m steeplechase	—N/a						8:43.4	(gold) GR
Michael Cleary; Gary Holdsworth; Bob Lay; Dennis Tipping	4×110 yd relay	41.2	1 Q	—N/a				44.7	5
Peter Quiggan; John Randall; Ken Roche; Brian Waters	4×440 yd relay	3:15.4	2 Q	—N/a				3:12.9	4
Rod Bonella	Marathon	—N/a						2:21:17.0	3rd place, bronze medalist(s)
Keith Ollerenshaw	Marathon	—N/a						2:24:59	4
Dave Power	Marathon	—N/a						2:22:15.4	2nd place, silver medalist(s)
Ian Sinfield	Marathon	—N/a						DNF	

Field events

Athlete	Event	Final	
Athlete	Event	Distance	Rank
Percy Hobson	High jump	6 ft 11 in (2.11 m)	(gold) GR
Lawrie Peckham	High jump	6 ft 8 in (2.03 m)	6
Chilla Porter	High jump	6 ft 10 in (2.08 m)	2nd place, silver medalist(s)
Tony Sneazwell	High jump	6 ft 7 in (2.01 m)	7
Trevor Bickle	Pole vault	14 ft 9 in (4.50 m)	(gold) GR, CR
Ross Filshie	Pole vault	14 ft 6 in (4.42 m)	3rd place, bronze medalist(s)
John Pfitzner	Pole vault	14 ft 0 in (4.27 m)	5
John Baguley	Long jump	25 ft 1 in (7.65 m)	5
John Blackmore	Long jump	23 ft 1 1/4 in (7.04 m)	=14
Jim McCann	Long jump	23 ft 1 1/4 in (7.04 m)	=14
Ian Tomlinson	Long jump	24 ft 6 1/4 in (7.47 m)	6
John Baguley	Triple jump	52 ft 9 1/4 in (16.08 m)	2nd place, silver medalist(s)
Graham Boase	Triple jump	51 ft 8 3/4 in (15.77 m)	4
Kevin Rule	Triple jump	48 ft 10 1/2 in (14.90 m)	8
Ian Tomlinson	Triple jump	53 ft 2 in (16.21 m)	(gold) GR
John Cochrane	Shot put	49 ft 3 1/4 in (15.02 m)	9
Merv Kemp	Shot put	52 ft 6 3/4 in (16.02 m)	5
Warren Ryan	Shot put	51 ft 8 in (15.75 m)	7
Warwick Selvey	Shot put	54 ft 6 1/2 in (16.62 m)	4
Len Chinnery	Discus throw	157 ft 3 in (47.93 m)	8
Warwick Selvey	Discus throw	185 ft 3 1/2 in (56.48 m)	(gold) GR, NR
Len Vlahov	Discus throw	158 ft 5 in (48.29 m)	6
Alan Waugh	Discus throw	152 ft 3 in (46.41 m)	9
Robert Brown	Hammer throw	189 ft 1 1/2 in (57.65 m)	3rd place, bronze medalist(s)
Mike Edwards	Hammer throw	178 ft 6 in (54.41 m)	=5
Dick Leffler	Hammer throw	196 ft 3 1/2 in (59.83 m)	2nd place, silver medalist(s)
Charlie Morris	Hammer throw	186 ft 3 1/2 in (56.78 m)	4
Nick Birks	Javelin throw	246 ft 3 1/2 in (75.07 m)	3rd place, bronze medalist(s)
Joseph Hart	Javelin throw	189 ft 8 1/2 in (57.82 m)	10
Alf Mitchell	Javelin throw	256 ft 3 in (78.11 m)	(gold) GR
Reg Spiers	Javelin throw	228 ft 8 in (69.70 m)	5

Women
Track events

Athlete	Event	Round 1		Semifinal		Final	
Athlete	Event	Result	Rank	Result	Rank	Result	Rank
Glenys Beasley	100 yd	11.0	1 Q	11.0	4	Did not advance	
Joyce Bennett	100 yd	11.1	2 Q	11.1	4	Did not advance	
Brenda Cox	100 yd	11.1	2 Q	10.9	1 Q	11.4	3rd place, bronze medalist(s)
Betty Cuthbert	100 yd	11.1	2 Q	11.0	5	Did not advance	
Joyce Bennett	220 yd	24.4	1 Q	24.0	1 Q	24.2	2nd place, silver medalist(s)
Margaret Burvill	220 yd	24.4	1 Q	24.0	2 Q	24.1	3rd place, bronze medalist(s)
Brenda Cox	220 yd	24.7	1 Q	24.1	3 Q	24.5	4
Betty Cuthbert	220 yd	24.9	2 Q	24.3	2 Q	24.6	5
Joan Beretta	880 yd	—N/a				2:12.2	5
Dixie Willis	880 yd	—N/a				2:03.7	(gold) GR
Margot Evans	80 m hurdles	11.2	3 Q	—N/a		11.9	5
Pam Kilborn	80 m hurdles	10.8	1 Q	—N/a		10.9	1st place, gold medalist(s)
Glenys Beasley; Joyce Bennett; Brenda Cox; Betty Cuthbert	4×110 yd relay	—N/a				46.6	1st place, gold medalist(s)

Field events

Athlete	Event	Final	
Athlete	Event	Distance	Rank
Helen Frith	High jump	5 ft 8 in (1.73 m)	2nd place, silver medalist(s)
Michele Mason	High jump	5 ft 8 in (1.73 m)	3rd place, bronze medalist(s)
Robyn Woodhouse	High jump	5 ft 10 in (1.78 m)	(gold) GR, CR
Carolyn Wright	High jump	5 ft 7 in (1.70 m)	6
Helen Frith	Long jump	20 ft 5 3/4 in (6.24 m)	2nd place, silver medalist(s)
Eva Kampe	Long jump	19 ft 3 3/4 in (5.89 m)	6
Pam Kilborn	Long jump	20 ft 6 3/4 in (6.27 m)	1st place, gold medalist(s)
Janet Knee	Long jump	20 ft 1 1/4 in (6.13 m)	3rd place, bronze medalist(s)
Mary Breen	Shot put	43 ft 3 3/4 in (13.20 m)	5
Larraine Hillier	Shot put	42 ft 3 1/2 in (12.89 m)	6
Jean Roberts	Shot put	47 ft 7 1/2 in (14.52 m)	2nd place, silver medalist(s)
Rosslyn Williams	Shot put	42 ft 1 3/4 in (12.85 m)	7
Mary Breen	Discus throw	140 ft 4 in (42.77 m)	5
Mary McDonald	Discus throw	151 ft 8 in (46.23 m)	3rd place, bronze medalist(s)
Rosslyn Williams	Discus throw	153 ft 1 in (46.66 m)	2nd place, silver medalist(s)
Anna Pazera	Javelin throw	159 ft 8 1/2 in (48.68 m)	3rd place, bronze medalist(s)
Pam Telfer	Javelin throw	134 ft 10 1/2 in (41.11 m)	6
Maureen Wright	Javelin throw	155 ft 4 1/2 in (47.36 m)	4

== Officials ==
Commandant & General Manager: Edgar Tanner
Assistant General Manager: Arthur Tunstall
Team Secretary: Owen Davies Attache: Kent Hughes
Section Officials: Athletics Manager - Alfred Robinson, Athletics Manageress - Maisie McQuiston, Track Coach - Stewart Embling, Field Coach - Desmond Frawley; Lawn Bowls Manager - Charles Smart; Boxing Manager - George Dickinson, Boxing Trainer/Coach - Ronald Barkli; Cycling Manager - Ronald O'Donnell, Track Coach - William Guyatt, Road Coach - Joseph Buckley; Fencing Manager - Laurence Smith, Fencing Coach - Charles Stanmore; Rowing Manager - Noel Wilkinson; Rowing Coach Singles and Double Sculls - Kevyn Webb, Rowing Coach Coxed Fours - Albert Bell, Rowing Coach Coxed Pairs and Fours - Wilhelmus Sirks, Rowing Coach Eights - Alan Jacobsen; Swimming Manager - Stuart Alldridt, Swimming Manageress - Dorothy Nordahl, Men's Swimming Coach - Don Talbot, Women's Swimming Coach - Arthur Cusack; Diving Coach - Jack Barnett; Weightlifting Manager - Bryan Marsden, Diving Coach/Trainer - Clive Morrison; Wrestling Manager - Richard Rodda, Coach /Trainer - Reginald Dowton

== See also ==
- Australia at the 1960 Summer Olympics
- Australia at the 1964 Summer Olympics
