= Athletics at the 1962 British Empire and Commonwealth Games – Men's 3000 metres steeplechase =

Men's 3000 metres steeplechase at the 1962 British Empire and Commonwealth Games
- Venue: Perry Lakes Stadium
- Date: 24 November 1962
- Competitors: 13 from 7 nations
- Winning time: 8:43.4 GR

Medalists
gold medal	Trevor Vincent	Australia
silver medal	Maurice Herriott	England
bronze medal	Ron Blackney	Australia

The men's 3000 metres steeplechase at the 1962 British Empire and Commonwealth Games as part of the athletics programme was held at the Perry Lakes Stadium on Saturday 24 November 1962.

This was the first time that the event was run at the Games, however the 2 mile steeplechase was contested in 1934 and 1938.

The event was won by Australian Trevor Vincent in 8:43.4 seconds, setting an inaugural Games record and breaking his own Australian record of 8:49.2. Vincent won by 15 yards ahead of the favoured Englishmen Maurice Herriott and fellow countryman Ron Blackney who won the bronze medal.

== Records ==
World record	Zdzisław Krzyszkowiak (POL)	8:30.4	Wałcz, Poland	26 June 1961
Commonwealth record				
Games record	N/A	N/A	N/A	N/A

The following records were established during the competition:

Date	Event	Name	Nationality	Time	Record
24 November	Final	Trevor Vincent	Australia	8:43.4	GR

== Final ==
Rank	Name	Nationality	Time	Notes
1st place, gold medalist(s)	Trevor Vincent	Australia	8:43.4	GR
2nd place, silver medalist(s)	Maurice Herriott	England	8:45.0	
3rd place, bronze medalist(s)	Ron Blackney	Australia	9:00.6	
4	Ian Blackwood	Australia	9:04:0	
5	David Chapman	England	9:05.6	
6	Edward O'Keefe	New Zealand	9:05.8	
7	John Coyle	Australia	9:15.0	
8	Hylke van der Wal	Canada	9:26.0	
9	Ludovico Amukun	Uganda	9:32.0	
10	Mubarak Shah	Pakistan	9:41.0	
11	Dilbagh Singh Kler	British North Borneo	9:45.0	
	Brian Hall	England		DNF
	Mel Batty	England		DNS
