= Athletics at the 1962 British Empire and Commonwealth Games – Men's 3 miles =

Men's 3 miles at the 1962 British Empire and Commonwealth Games
- Venue: Perry Lakes Stadium
- Date: 26 November 1962
- Competitors: 18 from 9 nations
- Winning time: 13:34.2

Medalists
gold medal	Murray Halberg	New Zealand
silver medal	Ron Clarke	Australia
bronze medal	Bruce Kidd	Canada

The men's 3 miles at the 1962 British Empire and Commonwealth Games as part of the athletics programme was held at the Perry Lakes Stadium on Monday 26 November 1962.

The event was won by the defending and Olympic champion as well as the world and Games record holder, New Zealand's Murray Halberg in 13:34.2. Halberg finished ahead of Australian Ron Clarke and Canadian Bruce Kidd who won the 6 mile event earlier in the meet.

== Records ==
World record	Murray Halberg (NZL)	13:10.0	Stockholm, Sweden	25 July 1961
Commonwealth record				
Games record	Murray Halberg (NZL)	13:15.0	Cardiff, Wales	23 July 1958

== Final ==
Rank	Name	Nationality	Time	Notes
1st place, gold medalist(s)	Murray Halberg	New Zealand	13:34.2	
2nd place, silver medalist(s)	Ron Clarke	Australia	13:36.0	
3rd place, bronze medalist(s)	Bruce Kidd	Canada	13:36.4	
4	Bruce Tulloh	England	13:37.8	
5	Albie Thomas	Australia	13:40.6	
6	Eddie Strong	England	13:41.4	
7	Pat Clohessy	Australia	13:42.0	
8	Derek Ibbotson	England	13:44.0	
9	John Anderson	England	13:44.0	
10	Arere Anentia	Kenya	13:47.0	
11	Kipchoge Keino	Kenya	13:50.0	
12	Tony Cook	Australia	14:17.0	
13	Anthony Ngatia	Kenya	14:33.0	
14	Alistair Fyfe	Gibraltar	15:47.0	
	Mubarak Shah	Pakistan		DNF
	Bill Baillie	New Zealand		DNS
	John Merriman	Wales		DNS
	Said Adeeb	Aden		DNS
