= Athletics at the 1962 British Empire and Commonwealth Games – Men's 6 miles =

Men's 6 miles at the 1962 British Empire and Commonwealth Games
- Venue: Perry Lakes Stadium
- Date: 24 November 1962
- Competitors: 18 from 8 nations
- Winning time: 28:26.6 GR

Medalists
gold medal	Bruce Kidd	Canada
silver medal	Dave Power	Australia
bronze medal	John Merriman	Wales

The men's 6 miles at the 1962 British Empire and Commonwealth Games as part of the athletics programme was held at the Perry Lakes Stadium on Saturday 24 November 1962.

The event was won by the 19-year-old Canadian Bruce Kidd finishing 100 yards ahead the defending champion, Australian Dave Power and Welshmen John Merriman. Kidd crossed the line in 28:26.6 breaking the Commonwealth Games record set by Power in Cardiff by 21.2 seconds. Such was the pace of the race that the top six place getters finished inside the Games record time.

== Records ==
World record	Sándor Iharos (HUN)	27:43.8	Budapest, Hungary	15 July 1956
Commonwealth record				
Games record	Dave Power (AUS)	28:47.8	Cardiff, Wales	20 July 1958

The following records were established during the competition:

Date	Event	Name	Nationality	Time	Record
24 November	Final	Bruce Kidd	Canada	28:26.6	GR

== Final ==
Rank	Name	Nationality	Time	Notes
1st place, gold medalist(s)	Bruce Kidd	Canada	28:26.6	GR
2nd place, silver medalist(s)	Dave Power	Australia	28:34.0	
3rd place, bronze medalist(s)	John Merriman	Wales	28:40.8	
4	Barry Magee	New Zealand	28:41.0	
5	Martin Hyman	England	28:42.2	
6	Mel Batty	England	28:44.6	
7	Arere Anentia	Kenya	29:07.0	
8	Henry Fowler	England	29:44.0	
9	Michael Bullivant	England	29:46.0	
10	Jeff Julian	New Zealand	29:50.0	
11	James Wahome	Kenya	30:04.0	
12	Bob Vagg	Australia	30:10.0	
13	John Stephen Akhwari	Tanganyika	31:08.0	
	Bill Baillie	New Zealand		DNF
	Ron Clarke	Australia		DNF
	Tony Cook	Australia		DNF
	Alistair Fyfe	Gibraltar		DNF
	Pascal Mfyomi	Tanganyika		DNF
