= Athletics at the 1962 British Empire and Commonwealth Games – Women's javelin throw =

Women's javelin throw at the 1962 British Empire and Commonwealth Games
- Venue: Perry Lakes Stadium
- Date: 29 November 1962
- Competitors: 6 from 3 nations
- Winning distance: 164 ft 10 1/2 in (50.25 m)

Medalists
gold medal	Sue Platt	England
silver medal	Rosemary Morgan	England
bronze medal	Anna Pazera	Australia

The women's javelin throw at the 1962 British Empire and Commonwealth Games as part of the athletics programme was held at the Perry Lakes Stadium on Thursday 29 November 1962.

The event was won by Englishwoman Sue Platt with a throw of 164 ft 10 1/2 in (50.25 m). Platt won by 2 ft 1 in (64 cm), ahead of her fellow countrywoman Rosemary Morgan and the defending champion Anna Pazera from Australia who won the bronze medal.

== Records ==
World record	Elvīra Ozoliņa (URS)	195 ft 4 1/2 in (59.55 m)	Bucharest, Romania	4 June 1960
Commonwealth record				
Games record	Anna Pazera (AUS)	188 ft 3 1/2 in (57.39 m)	Cardiff, Wales	24 July 1958

== Final ==
Rank	Name	Nationality	Result	Notes
1st place, gold medalist(s)	Sue Platt	England	164 ft 10 1/2 in (50.25 m)	
2nd place, silver medalist(s)	Rosemary Morgan	England	162 ft 9 1/2 in (49.62 m)	
3rd place, bronze medalist(s)	Anna Pazera	Australia	159 ft 8 1/2 in (48.68 m)	
4	Maureen Wright	Australia	155 ft 4 1/2 in (47.36 m)	
5	Pat Dobie	Canada	145 ft 9 1/2 in (44.44 m)	
6	Pam Telfer	Australia	134 ft 10 1/2 in (41.11 m)	
