= Athletics at the 1962 British Empire and Commonwealth Games – Women's discus throw =

Women's discus throw at the 1962 British Empire and Commonwealth Games
- Venue: Perry Lakes Stadium
- Date: 1 December 1962
- Competitors: 7 from 4 nations
- Winning distance: 164 ft 8 1/2 in (50.20 m) GR

Medalists
gold medal	Valerie Young	New Zealand
silver medal	Rosslyn Williams	Australia
bronze medal	Mary McDonald	Australia

The women's discus throw at the 1962 British Empire and Commonwealth Games as part of the athletics programme was held at the Perry Lakes Stadium on Saturday 1 December 1962.

The event was won by New Zealander Valerie Young who earlier won the shot put title. Young won by 11 ft 7 1/2 in (3.54 m) ahead of the Australian pairing of Rosslyn Williams and Mary McDonald and the defending champion, Englishwoman Suzanne Allday who finished in fourth. Young's throw of 164 ft 8 1/2 in (50.20 m) smashed the Games record set by Allday in Cardiff four years prior by 14 ft 1 in (4.29 m). Williams and McDonald also bettered the mark.

== Records ==
World record	Tamara Press (URS)	193 ft 6 in (58.98 m)	London, United Kingdom	20 September 1961
Commonwealth record				
Games record	Suzanne Allday (ENG)	150 ft 7 1/2 in (45.91 m)	Cardiff, Wales	27 July 1958

== Final ==
Rank	Name	Nationality	Result	Notes
1st place, gold medalist(s)	Valerie Young	New Zealand	164 ft 8 1/2 in (50.20 m)	GR
2nd place, silver medalist(s)	Rosslyn Williams	Australia	153 ft 1 in (46.66 m)	
3rd place, bronze medalist(s)	Mary McDonald	Australia	151 ft 8 in (46.23 m)	
4	Suzanne Allday	England	144 ft 3 in (43.97 m)	
5	Mary Breen	Australia	140 ft 4 in (42.77 m)	
6	Helen Thayer	New Zealand	135 ft 5 in (41.28 m)	
7	Pat Dobie	Canada	130 ft 11 in (39.90 m)	
