= Athletics at the 1962 British Empire and Commonwealth Games – Men's discus throw =

Men's discus throw at the 1962 British Empire and Commonwealth Games
- Venue: Perry Lakes Stadium
- Date: 26 November 1962
- Competitors: 14 from 7 nations
- Winning distance: 185 ft 3 1/2 in (56.48 m) GR

Medalists
gold medal	Warwick Selvey	Australia
silver medal	Mike Lindsay	Scotland
bronze medal	John Sheldrick	England

The men's discus throw at the 1962 British Empire and Commonwealth Games as part of the athletics programme was held at the Perry Lakes Stadium on Monday 26 November 1962.

The event was won by Australian Warwick Selvey with a throw of 185 ft 3 1/2 in (56.48 m), setting a new Games and Australian record. Selvey won by 12 ft 9 1/2 in (3.90 m) ahead of Scotsman Mike Lindsay and England's John Sheldrick who won the bronze medal.

== Records ==
World record	Al Oerter (USA)	204 ft 10 1/2 in (62.45 m)	Chicago, Illinois, United States	1 July 1962
Commonwealth record				
Games record	Fanie du Plessis (SAF)	183 ft 6 1/2 in (55.94 m)	Cardiff, Wales	22 July 1958

== Final ==
Rank	Name	Nationality	Result	Notes
1st place, gold medalist(s)	Warwick Selvey	Australia	185 ft 3 1/2 in (56.48 m)	GR, NR
2nd place, silver medalist(s)	Mike Lindsay	Scotland	172 ft 6 in (52.58 m)	
3rd place, bronze medalist(s)	John Sheldrick	England	166 ft 3 in (50.67 m)	
4	Robin Tait	New Zealand	165 ft 8 1/2 in (50.51 m)	
5	Les Mills	New Zealand	162 ft 0 in (49.38 m)	
6	Len Vlahov	Australia	158 ft 5 in (48.29 m)	
7	Roy Hollingsworth	England	157 ft 8 1/2 in (48.07 m)	
8	Len Chinnery	Australia	157 ft 3 in (47.93 m)	
9	Alan Waugh	Australia	152 ft 3 in (46.41 m)	
10	Muhammad Ayub	Pakistan	147 ft 8 in (45.01 m)	
11	Martyn Lucking	England	137 ft 0 1/2 in (41.77 m)	
12	Imbert Roberts	Saint Lucia	118 ft 2 1/2 in (36.03 m)	
	Gerry Moro	Canada		DNS
	Howard Payne	England		DNS
