= 1964 AAA Championships =

Outdoor track and field competition

- Dates: 10–11 July 1964
- Host city: London, England
- Venue: White City Stadium
- Level: Senior
- Type: Outdoor

The 1964 AAA Championships was the 1964 edition of the annual outdoor track and field competition organised by the Amateur Athletic Association (AAA). It was held from 10 to 11 July 1964 at White City Stadium in London, England.

== Summary ==
The Championships covered two days of competition. The marathon was held in Coventry and the decathlon event was held in Loughborough.

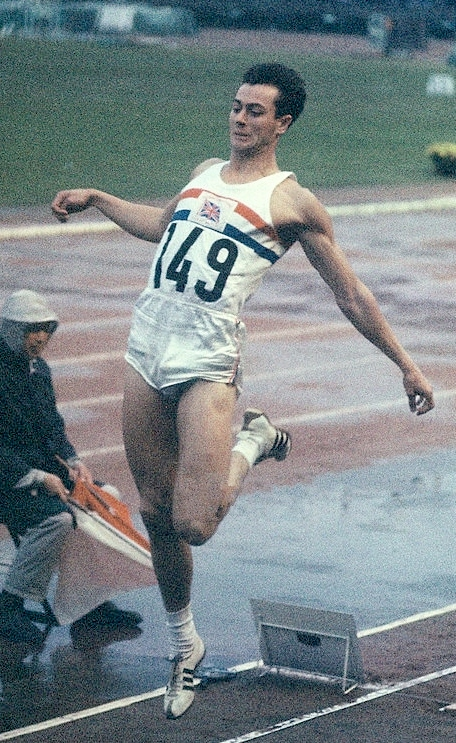
Welshman Lynn Davies won the long jump and would go on to win Olympic Gold later that year

== Results ==
Event	Gold		Silver		Bronze	
100 yards	(Cuba) Enrique Figuerola	9.66	(Wales) Lynn Davies	9.7	(Kenya) Seraphino Antao	9.7
220 yards	(Scotland) Menzies Campbell	21.1	(Kenya) Seraphino Antao	21.3	Len Carter	21.7
440 yards	Robbie Brightwell	47.5	(Jamaica) George Kerr	48.0	Tim Graham	48.3
880 yards	(Canada) Bill Crothers	1:50.1	(Republic of Ireland) Noel Carroll	:50.7	(Republic of Ireland) Derek McCleane	1:51.0
1 mile	Alan Simpson	4:01.1	Mike Wiggs	4:01.6	(United States) Ben Tucker	4:02.3
3 miles	(Poland) Lech Boguszewicz	13:24.42	(Poland) Witold Baran	13:26.77	Bruce Tulloh	13:28.05
6 miles	Mike Bullivant	27:26.44 NR	Ron Hill	27:27.01	Jim Hogan	27:35.03
10 miles	Mel Batty	47:26.8 WR	(Scotland) Fergus Murray	48:41.0	Terence Smith	50:56.0
marathon	Brian Kilby	2:23:01	Jack Haslam	2:28:35	Robin Campbell	2:29:07
steeplechase	Maurice Herriott	8:40.0	Ernie Pomfret	8:51.0	Tim Johnston	8:55.2
120y hurdles	Mike Parker	14.2	Laurie Taitt	14.2	Bob Birrell	14.3
440y hurdles	John Cooper	51.1 NR	Peter Warden	51.4	(United States) Tom Wyatt	51.9
2 miles walk	Ken Matthews	13:22.4	Colin Williams	14:44.8	Malcolm Tolley	14:49.2
7 miles walk	Ken Matthews	48:23.0 NR	Paul Nihill	51:20.0	Roy Hart	53:56.0
high jump	(Scotland) Crawford Fairbrother	2.032	Gordon Miller	2.007	(Scotland) Sandy Kilpatrick	1.981
pole vault	(United States) Fred Hansen	4.57	Trevor Burton	4.57 NR	(Scotland) Dave Stevenson; Rex Porter	4.27; 4.27
long jump	(Wales) Lynn Davies	7.95	John Morbey	7.79	Fred Alsop	7.61
triple jump	Fred Alsop	15.92	Mike Ralph	15.59	Derek Boosey	15.45
shot put	(Hungary) Vilmos Varjú	18.84	Martyn Lucking	17.96	(Scotland) Mike Lindsay	17.84
discus throw	Roy Hollingsworth	54.81	Arthur McKenzie	48.04	Bill Tancred	47.13
hammer throw	Howard Payne	59.88	Warwick Dixon	56.92	(Republic of Ireland) John Lawlor	56.30
javelin throw	John FitzSimons	74.09	Roger Lane	72.52	John Greasley	72.33
decathlon	Derek Clarke	6084	David Gaskin	5950	(Wales) Clive Longe	5809

== See also ==
- 1964 WAAA Championships
