= Trevor Vincent =

Australian long-distance runner

Trevor Vincent OAM
Personal information
- Nickname: TV
- Nationality: Australian
- Born: Trevor Anthony Vincent; 27 April 1938 (age 88) Armadale, Victoria
- Height: 174 cm (5 ft 9 in)
- Weight: 64 kg (141 lb)

Sport
- Country: Australia
- Sport: Track and field
- Events: 3000 metres steeplechase, 1500 metres, 5000 metres
- Club: Glenhuntly Athletics Club
Medal record
Men's athletics
Representing Australia
Athletic Championships
Event	1st	2nd	3rd
Commonwealth Games	1	0	0
Australian National Championships	6	4	2
Total	7	4	2
Commonwealth Games
Gold medal – first place	1962 Perth	3000 m steeplechase
Australian National Championships
Silver medal – second place	1958 Brisbane	3000 m steeplechase
Bronze medal – third place	1959 Hobart	3000 m steeplechase
Gold medal – first place	1961 Brisbane	1500 m
Gold medal – first place	1961 Brisbane	3000 m steeplechase
Gold medal – first place	1962 Sydney	3000 m steeplechase
Gold medal – first place	1963 Adelaide	5000 m
Silver medal – second place	1963 Adelaide	1500 m
Silver medal – second place	1963 Adelaide	3000 m steeplechase
Gold medal – first place	1964 Melbourne	3000 m steeplechase
Gold medal – first place	1965 Hobart	3000 m steeplechase
Silver medal – second place	1965 Hobart	1500 m
Bronze medal – third place	1965 Hobart	5000 m

Trevor Anthony Vincent, OAM (born 27 April 1938) is a former Australian long-distance runner, specialising in the 3000 metres steeplechase. In 1962 he competed for his native country at the Commonwealth Games in Perth, Western Australia, winning the gold medal in the 3000m steeplechase event, setting an inaugural Commonwealth Games record and breaking his own Australian record. He also competed at the 1964 Summer Olympics in Tokyo, Japan in the 3000 metres steeplechase event.

== Early life and family ==
Trevor Vincent was born 27 April 1938 in Armadale, Victoria.

Trevor has a wife Lois and three sons: Greg, Gary and Brett. He also has eight grandchildren: Rachel, Nicholas, Marcus, Sarah, Kate, Zahli, Rhiannon and Ebony.

== Athletic career ==
In 1962 Vincent competed for Australia at the 1962 British Empire and Commonwealth Games in Perth, Western Australia, winning the gold medal in the 3000m steeplechase event with a time of 8:43.4 seconds, setting an inaugural Commonwealth Games record and breaking his own Australian record of 8:49.2. The race was staged at Perry Lakes Stadium in Floreat, Western Australia on 24 November. Vincent won by 15 yards ahead of the favoured Englishmen Maurice Herriott and fellow countryman Ron Blackney who won the bronze medal. In the lead up to the Perth games, Vincent trained alongside Olympian Ron Clarke and Commonwealth Games bronze medallist Rod Bonella at Caulfield Racecourse, running up to 160 km a week.

He also competed at the 1964 Summer Olympics in Tokyo, Japan in the 3000m steeplechase event. Vincent set a time of 8:58.8 seconds, placing 8th, however failing to qualify for the final after being hampered by injury.

Trevor competed in numerous Australian National Athletic Championships, having continued success in the 3000 metres steeplechase event, 5000 metres and 1500 metres. He also attended the 1963 Australian Cross Country Championships, winning the gold medal in the 10 km event.

=== Personal bests ===
Event	Time	𝘓𝘰𝘊𝘢𝘵𝘪𝘰𝘯 𝘐 𝘬𝘯𝘰𝘸 𝘶𝘳 𝘨𝘳𝘢𝘯𝘥𝘥𝘢𝘶𝘨𝘩𝘵𝘦𝘳 𝘚𝘢𝘳𝘢𝘩 𝘴𝘩𝘦 𝘪𝘴 𝘮𝘺 𝘵𝘦𝘢𝘤𝘩𝘦𝘳 𝘣𝘶𝘵 𝘴𝘩𝘦 𝘸𝘦𝘯𝘵 𝘰𝘯 𝘩𝘰𝘭𝘥𝘪𝘯𝘨	Date	Note
Marathon	2:26:13	Melbourne, Australia	1970-09-26	1970 Melbourne Marathon
10K run	29:12.6	Melbourne, Australia	1963-09-15	Beating his previous personal best set in 1961
3000 m Steeplechase	8:38.9; GR	Perth, Western Australia	1962-11-24	1962 British Empire and Commonwealth Games
2 miles	8:47.4	Melbourne, Australia	1962-09-01	
10K run	30:56	Melbourne, Australia	1961-12-18	

== Competition record ==
=== International competitions ===
Year	Competition	Venue	Position	Event	Notes
Representing Australia
1962	Commonwealth Games	Perth, Western Australia	1st	3000 metres steeplechase	8:43.4
1964	Summer Olympics	Tokyo, Japan		3000 metres steeplechase	8:58.8

=== National championships ===
Year	Competition	Venue	Position	Event
1958	Australian Championships	Sydney, New South Wales	2nd	3000 metres steeplechase
1959	Australian Championships	Melbourne, Victoria	3rd	3000 metres steeplechase
1961	Australian Championships	Brisbane, Queensland	1st	1 mile
1961	Australian Championships	Sydney, New South Wales	1st	3000 metres steeplechase
1962	Australian Championships	Sydney, New South Wales	1st	3000 metres steeplechase
1963	Australian Championships	Adelaide, South Australia	2nd	1 mile
1963	Australian Championships	Adelaide, South Australia	1st	3-mile
1963	Australian Championships	Adelaide, South Australia	2nd	3000 metres steeplechase
1963	Australian Cross Country Championship	Adelaide, South Australia	3rd	10,000 metres
1964	Australian Championships	Melbourne, Victoria	1st	3000 metres steeplechase
1965	Australian Championships	Hobart, Tasmania	2nd	1 mile
1965	Australian Championships	Hobart, Tasmania	3rd	3-mile
1965	Australian Championships	Hobart, Tasmania	1st	3000 metres steeplechase

== Personal life ==
Vincent was part of the Olympic Torch Relay for the Sydney 2000 Summer Olympics. He was also a part of the Queen's Baton Relay for the Melbourne 2006 Commonwealth Games, as well as the Gold Coast 2018 Commonwealth Games.

Vincent has been awarded an Australian Sports Medal in 2000, and the Medal of the Order of Australia for service to athletics in 2008.

As at 2024, Trevor coaches a Glenhuntly Athletics Club, Melbourne.

== See also ==
- Olympic medalists in athletics
- Athletics at the 1962 British Empire and Commonwealth Games – Men's 3000 metres steeplechase
- 1962 British Empire and Commonwealth Games
- 1964 Summer Olympics
