= England at the 1962 British Empire and Commonwealth Games =

- CG code: ENG
- CGA: Commonwealth Games England
- Website: weareengland.org

in Perth, Australia
- Medals Ranked 2nd: Gold 29 Silver 22 Bronze 27 Total 78

British Empire and Commonwealth Games appearances
- 1930; 1934; 1938; 1950; 1954; 1958; 1962; 1966; 1970; 1974; 1978; 1982; 1986; 1990; 1994; 1998; 2002; 2006; 2010; 2014; 2018; 2022; 2026; 2030

England competed at the 1962 British Empire and Commonwealth Games in Perth, Western Australia, from 22 November to 1 December 1962.

England finished second in the medal table behind Australia with 29 gold medals, 22 silver medals and 27 bronze medals.

== Medal table (top three) ==
Rank	Nation	Gold	Silver	Bronze	Total
1	Australia	38	36	31	105
2	England	29	22	27	78
3	New Zealand	10	12	10	32
Totals (3 entries)		77	70	68	215

== Medalists ==
Medal	Name	Sport	Event	Date
Gold	Dorothy Hyman	Athletics	Women's 100 yards	26 November
Gold	Brian Kilby	Athletics	Men's marathon	29 November
Gold	Martyn Lucking	Athletics	Men's shot put	29 November
Gold	Dorothy Hyman	Athletics	Women's 220 yards	29 November
Gold	Sue Platt	Athletics	Women's javelin throw	29 November
Gold	Len Carter; David Jones; Alf Meakin; Peter Radford	Athletics	Men's 4 × 110 yards relay	1 December
Gold	Howard Payne	Athletics	Men's hammer throw	1 December
Silver	Maurice Herriott	Athletics	Men's 3000 metres steeplechase	24 November
Silver	Colin Smith	Athletics	Men's javelin throw	24 November
Silver	David Jones	Athletics	Men's 220 yards	29 November
Silver	Robbie Brightwell	Athletics	Men's 440 yards	29 November
Silver	Rosemary Morgan	Athletics	Women's javelin throw	29 November
Silver	Robbie Brightwell; Barry Jackson; Adrian Metcalfe; Bob Setti	Athletics	Men's 4 × 440 yards relay	1 December
Silver	Betty Moore	Athletics	Women's 80 metres hurdles	1 December
Silver	Daphne Arden; Dorothy Hyman; Betty Moore; Ann Packer	Athletics	Women's 4 × 110 yards relay	1 December
Bronze	Suzanne Allday	Athletics	Women's shot put	24 November
Bronze	John Sheldrick	Athletics	Men's discus throw	26 November
Bronze	Laurie Taitt	Athletics	Men's 120 yards hurdles	29 November
Bronze	Fred Alsop	Athletics	Men's triple jump	29 November
Bronze	Joy Jordan	Athletics	Women's 880 yards	1 December

== Sports ==
=== Athletics ===
Men

Name	Club
Fred Alsop	Hornchurch Harriers
John Anderson	Saltwell Harriers
Mel Batty	Thurrock Harriers
Bob Birrell	Loughborough Coll
Robbie Brightwell	Birchfield Harriers
Michael Bullivant	Derby County & AC
Len Carter	Ruislip & Northwood AC
David Chapman	Woodford Green AC
Mike Fleet	Croydon Harriers
Roy Fowler	Staffs and Stone AC
Brian Hall	Manchester & District LC Harriers
Maurice Herriott	Sparkhill Harriers
Roy Hollingsworth	Highgate Harriers
John Howell	Herne Hill Harriers
Martin Hyman	Portsmouth AC
Derek Ibbotson	Longwood Harriers
Barry Jackson	Lozelles Harriers
David Jones	Woodford Green AC
Brian Kilby	Coventry Godiva Harriers
Martyn Lucking	Southend AC
Alf Meakin	Thames Valley Harriers
John McSorley	Thames Valley Harriers
Adrian Metcalfe	Leeds AC & Achilles Club
Gordon Miller	South London Harriers
Nick Overhead	Watford Harriers Club
Howard Payne	Birchfield Harriers
Rex Porter	Birchfield Harriers
Sid Purkis	Romford AC
Peter Radford	Birchfield Harriers
Bob Setti	Herne Hill Harriers
John Sheldrick	Thames Valley Harriers
Alan Simpson	Rotherham Harriers & AC
Colin Smith	Thames Valley Harriers
Eddie Strong	Bristol AC
Chris Surety	Ilford AC
Laurie Taitt	Herne Hill Harriers
Stan Taylor	Manchester AC
Bruce Tulloh	Portsmouth AC
Peter Wilkinson	Derby County & AC

Women

Name	Club
Suzanne Allday	Spartan LAC
Daphne Arden	Birchfield Harriers
Joy Grieveson	Darlington
Dorothy Hyman	Hickleton Main
Joy Jordan	Spartan LAC
Linda Knowles	Hornchurch Harriers
Betty Moore	Salford Harriers
Rosemary Morgan	Ilford AC
Pat Nutting	Ruislip & Northwood AC
Ann Packer	Reading AC
Sheila Parkin	Sheffield United Harriers
Phyllis Perkins	Ilford AC
Sue Platt	London Olympiades
Dorothy Shirley	Salford Harriers
Frances Slaap	Ruislip & Northwood AC

Results

Men
Track & road events

Athlete	Event	Round 1		Round 2		Semifinal		Final	
Athlete	Event	Result	Rank	Result	Rank	Result	Rank	Result	Rank
Len Carter	100 yd	10.0	3 Q	10.2	5	Did not advance			
David Jones	100 yd	9.6	1 Q	9.9	3	Did not advance			
Alf Meakin	100 yd	9.7	3 Q	9.9	3	Did not advance			
Peter Radford	100 yd	9.7	2 Q	9.8	2 Q	9.8	5	Did not advance	
Len Carter	220 yd	22.3	4 Q	22.5	4	Did not advance			
David Jones	220 yd	21.4	1 Q	21.7	1 Q	21.4	2 Q	21.5	2nd place, silver medalist(s)
Alf Meakin	220 yd	22.0	5	Did not advance					
Peter Radford	220 yd	21.5	2 Q	21.9	3 Q	21.6	5	Did not advance	
Robbie Brightwell	440 yd	47.5	1 Q	—N/a		47.4	1 Q	46.8	2nd place, silver medalist(s)
Barry Jackson	440 yd	47.5	2 Q	—N/a		DNF		Did not advance	
Adrian Metcalfe	440 yd	48.3	3	—N/a		Did not advance			
Nick Overhead	440 yd	48.4	3	—N/a		Did not advance			
Mike Fleet	880 yd	1:51.5	2 Q	—N/a		1:51.2	3	1:50.0	5
Sid Purkis	880 yd	1:50.9	2 Q	—N/a		1:54.1	6	Did not advance	
Bob Setti	880 yd	1:52.2	3	—N/a		Did not advance			
Stan Taylor	880 yd	1:52.4	3	—N/a		Did not advance			
Brian Hall	1 mile	4:18.9	8	—N/a				Did not advance	
Alan Simpson	1 mile	4:03.0	4	—N/a				Did not advance	
Stan Taylor	1 mile	4:08.7	3 Q	—N/a				4:12.7	7
Bruce Tulloh	1 mile	4:02.5	3 Q	—N/a				4:22.1	9
John Anderson	3 miles	—N/a						13:44.0	9
Derek Ibbotson	3 miles	—N/a						13:44.0	8
Eddie Strong	3 miles	—N/a						13:41.4	6
Bruce Tulloh	3 miles	—N/a						13:37.8	4
Mel Batty	6 miles	—N/a						28:44.6	6
Michael Bullivant	6 miles	—N/a						29:46.0	9
Roy Fowler	6 miles	—N/a						29:44.0	8
Martin Hyman	6 miles	—N/a						28:42.2	5
Bob Birrell	120 yd hurdles	14.3	1 Q	—N/a				15.2	6
Laurie Taitt	120 yd hurdles	14.3	1 Q	—N/a				14.7	3rd place, bronze medalist(s)
Chris Surety	440 yd hurdles	53.8	3 Q	—N/a				53.3	6
Mel Batty	3000 m steeplechase	—N/a						DNS	
David Chapman	3000 m steeplechase	—N/a						9:05.6	5
Brian Hall	3000 m steeplechase	—N/a						DNF	
Maurice Herriott	3000 m steeplechase	—N/a						8:45.0	2nd place, silver medalist(s)
Len Carter; David Jones; Alf Meakin; Peter Radford	4×110 yd relay	41.0	1 Q	—N/a				40.6	(gold) GR, =BR
Robbie Brightwell; Barry Jackson; Adrian Metcalfe; Bob Setti	4×440 yd relay	3:13.1	1 Q	—N/a				3:11.2	2nd place, silver medalist(s)
Mel Batty	Marathon	—N/a						2:25:51	5
Martin Hyman	Marathon	—N/a						2:32:07	9
Brian Kilby	Marathon	—N/a						2:21:17.0	(gold) GR
Peter Wilkinson	Marathon	—N/a						2:30:51	8

Field events

Athlete	Event	Final	
Athlete	Event	Distance	Rank
John Howell	High jump	DNS	
Gordon Miller	High jump	6 ft 8 in (2.03 m)	4
Laurie Taitt	High jump	DNS	
Rex Porter	Pole vault	13 ft 0 in (3.96 m)	12
Fred Alsop	Long jump	24 ft 2 1/4 in (7.37 m)	9
John Howell	Long jump	24 ft 2 3/4 in (7.39 m)	8
Fred Alsop	Triple jump	52 ft 7 in (16.03 m)	(bronze) BR
John Howell	Triple jump	47 ft 0 in (14.33 m)	11
Roy Hollingsworth	Shot put	43 ft 7 3/4 in (13.30 m)	14
Martyn Lucking	Shot put	59 ft 4 in (18.08 m)	(gold) GR
John McSorley	Shot put	39 ft 0 in (11.89 m)	16
John Sheldrick	Shot put	47 ft 1 1/4 in (14.36 m)	11
Roy Hollingsworth	Discus throw	157 ft 8 1/2 in (48.07 m)	7
Martyn Lucking	Discus throw	137 ft 0 1/2 in (41.77 m)	11
Howard Payne	Discus throw	DNS	
John Sheldrick	Discus throw	166 ft 3 in (50.67 m)	3rd place, bronze medalist(s)
John McSorley	Hammer throw	DNS	
Howard Payne	Hammer throw	202 ft 3 in (61.65 m)	1st place, gold medalist(s)
John Sheldrick	Hammer throw	DNS	
Roy Hollingsworth	Javelin throw	DNS	
John McSorley	Javelin throw	190 ft 2 1/2 in (57.98 m)	9
Colin Smith	Javelin throw	255 ft 8 1/2 in (77.94 m)	2nd place, silver medalist(s)

Women
Track events

Athlete	Event	Round 1		Semifinal		Final	
Athlete	Event	Result	Rank	Result	Rank	Result	Rank
Daphne Arden	100 yd	11.1	3 Q	10.9	3 Q	11.6	5
Dorothy Hyman	100 yd	11.0	1 Q	10.7	1 Q	11.2	1st place, gold medalist(s)
Betty Moore	100 yd	11.0	1 Q	11.0	3 Q	11.7	6
Ann Packer	100 yd	11.3	2 Q	11.2	5	Did not advance	
Daphne Arden	220 yd	24.8	2 Q	24.7	4	Did not advance	
Joy Grieveson	220 yd	25.2	3 Q	25.1	6	Did not advance	
Dorothy Hyman	220 yd	24.5	1 Q	24.0	2 Q	23.8	1st place, gold medalist(s)
Ann Packer	220 yd	24.8	2 Q	24.5	4	Did not advance	
Joy Grieveson	880 yd	—N/a				DNS	
Joy Jordan	880 yd	—N/a				2:05.9	3rd place, bronze medalist(s)
Phyllis Perkins	880 yd	—N/a				2:09.4	4
Betty Moore	80 m hurdles	10.8	2 Q	—N/a		11.3	2nd place, silver medalist(s)
Pat Nutting	80 m hurdles	11.4	2 Q	—N/a		11.5	4
Ann Packer	80 m hurdles	11.4	3 Q	—N/a		11.9	6
Frances Slaap	80 m hurdles	12.0	5	—N/a		Did not advance	
Daphne Arden; Dorothy Hyman; Betty Moore; Ann Packer	4×110 yd relay	—N/a				46.6	2nd place, silver medalist(s)

Field events

Athlete	Event	Final	
Athlete	Event	Distance	Rank
Linda Knowles	High jump	5 ft 8 in (1.73 m)	4
Dorothy Shirley	High jump	5 ft 6 in (1.68 m)	7
Frances Slaap	High jump	5 ft 7 in (1.70 m)	5
Pat Nutting	Long jump	18 ft 4 in (5.59 m)	7
Sheila Parkin	Long jump	19 ft 3 1/4 in (5.87 m)	5
Suzanne Allday	Shot put	44 ft 6 in (13.56 m)	3rd place, bronze medalist(s)
Sue Platt	Shot put	37 ft 10 in (11.53 m)	8
Suzanne Allday	Discus throw	144 ft 3 in (43.97 m)	4
Rosemary Morgan	Javelin throw	162 ft 9 1/2 in (49.62 m)	2nd place, silver medalist(s)
Sue Platt	Javelin throw	164 ft 10 1/2 in (50.25 m)	1st place, gold medalist(s)

=== Boxing ===
Name	Event/s	Club	Medal/s
Peter Benneyworth	54 kg bantamweight	Caius BC, Battersea	Bronze medal
Brian Brazier	63.5 kg light welterweight	Army BC	Bronze medal
Alf Matthews	75 kg middleweight	Litherland ABC, Liverpool	
Dennis Pollard	81 kg light-heavyweight	Fitzroy Lodge ABC	
Johnny Pritchett	67 kg welterweight	Bingham & District ABC	Silver medal
Mike Pye	51 kg flyweight	Harris Lebus BC, Tottenham	Bronze medal
Brian Whelan	60 kg lightweight	Chiswick ABC	Bronze medal

=== Cycling ===
Name	Event/s	Club	Medal/s
Bob Addy	road race	Hemel Hempstead CC	
Karl Barton	match sprint & time trial	Coventry Road Club	Silver medal
Keith Butler	road race	Norwood Paragon CC	
John Clarey	scratch	Cambrian Wheelers CC	Bronze medal
Harry Jackson	scratch & time trial & pursuit	Portsmouth North End CC	Bronze medal
Wes Mason	road race	Sheffield RCC	Gold medal
Charlie McCoy	pursuit	Melling Wheelers	
Joe McLean	scratch & pursuit	Melling Wheelers	
Ken Nuttall	road race	Manchester Wheelers	
Roger Whitfield	match sprint & time trial	East Midlands CG	Bronze medal

=== Diving ===
Men

Name	Event/s	Club	Medal/s
Keith Collin	3m Springboard	Highgate DC	
Tony Kitcher	10m Platform	City of Southampton SC	Bronze medal
Brian Phelps	10m Platform & 3m Springboard	Highgate DC	,
William Wood	10m Platform	Highgate DC	
Dennis Young	3m Springboard	Nelson Baths	

Women

Name	Event/s	Club	Medal/s
Margaret Austen	10m Platform & 3m Springboard	Isleworth Penguin	Silver medal
Liz Ferris	3m Springboard	Mermaid	Silver medal
Joy Newman	10m Platform	Islander Ladies	

=== Fencing ===
Men

Name	Event/s	Medal/s
Mike Amberg	sabre individual & team	Gold medal
George Birks	sabre individual & team	Gold medal
Ralph Cooperman	foil, sabre, individual & team	,,,
Mike Howard	épée individual & team	Gold medal
Peter Jacobs	épée individual & team	,
Allan Jay	foil individual & team	,
René Paul	foil individual & team	Gold medal
John Pelling	épée individual & team	,

Women

Name	Event/s	Medal/s
Theresa Offredy	foil individual	
Gillian Sheen	foil individual	

=== Lawn bowls ===
Name	Event/s	Club	Medal/s
David Bryant	singles & rinks/fours	Clevedon BC	,
Sydney Drysdale	rinks/fours	Whitley Bay BC	Gold medal
Tom Fleming	pairs & rinks/fours	Albert Park BC, Middlesbrough	Gold medal
Les Watson	pairs & rinks/fours	Darlington East Park BC	Gold medal

=== Rowing ===
Name	Event/s	Club	Medal/s
Bill Barry	single scull	Quintin Boat Club	Silver medal
John Beveridge	coxless four & eights	Molesey BC	,
Nicholas Birkmyre	double scull	Bristol Ariel RC / Leander Club	Gold medal
Michael Clay	coxless four & eights	Molesey BC	,
Christopher Davidge	coxless four & eights	Molesey BC	,
Stewart Farquharson	coxless pair	University of London BC	Gold medal
Michael Howard-Johnston	fours & eights (cox)	Molesey BC	,
George Justicz	double scull	Birmingham RC / Leander Club	Gold medal
Richard Knight	coxed fours & eights	Molesey BC	,
David Lee Nicholson	coxless pair	University of London BC	Gold medal
Colin Porter	coxed fours & eights	Molesey BC	,
John Russell	coxed fours & eights	Molesey BC	,
John Tilbury	coxless four & eights	Molesey BC	,
John Vigurs	coxed fours & eights	Molesey BC	,

=== Swimming ===
Men

Name	Event/s	Club	Medal/s
Richard Campion	440 & 1650y freestyle & 440 medley & relay	Stoke Newington SC	Bronze medal
Stanley Clarke	110y freestyle & relay	Plaistow United SC	,
Rodney Clayden	110 & 220y backstroke, freestyle relay	York City SC	Bronze medal
Roddy Frame	440y medley	York City SC	
Terry Glenville	110 & 220y butterfly, medley relay	Hull Olympic SC	Silver medal
Peter Kendrew	110y freestyle & medley & freestyle relay	York SC	,,
John Martin-Dye	110 & 440y freestyle & relay	Penguin SC	,
Neil Nicholson	110 & 220y breaststroke, medley relay	Gateshead SC	,
Graham Sykes	110y & 220y backstroke, medley	Standard Truimph	,
Austin Verner	440y freestyle	Urmston SC	
Christopher Wilkinson	110 & 220y breaststroke	Stockport SC	

Women

Name	Event/s	Club	Medal/s
Linda Amos	110 & 440y freestyle & relay	Portsmouth Northsea SC	Bronze medal
Patricia Baines	110y butterfly	Stoke Newington SC	
Mary-Anne Cotterill	110y butterfly & medley relay	Watford SC	,
Jackie Enfield	110 & 220y breaststroke	Northampton ASC	Silver medal
Dorinda Fraser	110 & 220y breaststroke	Gateshead SC	Bronze medal
Judy Gegan	110y butterfly	Beckenham Ladies	
Sandra Keen	110y freestyle & relay	Heston SC	Bronze medal
Sylvia Lewis	110 & 220y Backstroke	Hounslow SC	,
Liz Long	440y freestyle & relay	Ilford SC	,
Anita Lonsbrough	110/220 breaststroke, 440 freestyle & medley, relay	Huddersfield SC	,,,
Linda Ludgrove	110 & 220y backstroke & medley relay	St James SC	,,
Jill Norfolk	110 & 220y backstroke	Stoke Newington SC	
Diana Wilkinson	110y freestyle & medley & freestyle relay	Stockport SC	,

=== Weightlifting ===
Name	Event/s	Medal/s
Carlton Goring	67.5 kg lightweight	Gold medal
George Manners	82.5 kg light heavyweight	Silver medal
Louis Martin	90 kg middle heavyweight	Gold medal
George Newton	60 kg featherweight	Gold medal
David Prowse	110 kg heavyweight	

=== Wrestling ===
Name	Event/s	Medal/s
Len Allen	74 kg welterweight	Bronze medal
Peter Amey	68 kg lightweight	
Bert Aspen	62 kg featherweight	Bronze medal
Tony Buck	90 kg light-heavyweight	Gold medal
Denis McNamara	100 kg heavyweight	Bronze medal
Walter Pilling	57 kg bantamweight	Silver medal
