= Athletics at the 1962 British Empire and Commonwealth Games – Women's shot put =

Women's shot put at the 1962 British Empire and Commonwealth Games
- Venue: Perry Lakes Stadium
- Date: 24 November 1962
- Competitors: 8 from 4 nations
- Winning distance: 49 ft 11 1/2 in (15.23 m)

Medalists
gold medal	Valerie Young	New Zealand
silver medal	Jean Roberts	Australia
bronze medal	Suzanne Allday	England

The women's shot put at the 1962 British Empire and Commonwealth Games as part of the athletics programme was held at the Perry Lakes Stadium on Saturday 24 November 1962.

The event was won by the defending champion New Zealand's Valerie Young with a throw of 49 ft 11 1/2 in (15.23 m), finishing ahead of Jean Roberts of Australia and Suzanne Allday from England who won the bronze medal.

== Records ==
World record	Tamara Press (URS)	60 ft 10 1/4 in (18.55 m)	Leipzig, East Germany	10 June 1962
Commonwealth record				
Games record	Valerie Sloper (NZL)	51 ft 0 in (15.54 m)	Cardiff, Wales	20 July 1958

== Final ==
Rank	Name	Nationality	Result	Notes
1st place, gold medalist(s)	Valerie Young	New Zealand	49 ft 11 1/2 in (15.23 m)	
2nd place, silver medalist(s)	Jean Roberts	Australia	47 ft 7 1/2 in (14.52 m)	
3rd place, bronze medalist(s)	Suzanne Allday	England	44 ft 6 in (13.56 m)	
4	Mary Peters	Northern Ireland	43 ft 8 in (13.31 m)	
5	Mary Breen	Australia	43 ft 3 3/4 in (13.20 m)	
6	Larraine Hillier	Australia	42 ft 3 1/2 in (12.89 m)	
7	Rosslyn Williams	Australia	42 ft 1 3/4 in (12.85 m)	
8	Sue Platt	England	37 ft 10 in (11.53 m)	
