= Chris Surety =

British hurdler

Personal information
- Nationality: British (English)
- Born: 4 January 1937 East Ham, London, England
- Died: 31 July 2017 (aged 80) Langdon Hills, Essex, England

Sport
- Sport: Athletics
- Event: Sprints / hurdles
- Club: Ilford AC

Christopher Walter Edward Surety (4 January 1937 – 31 July 2017), was a former athlete who competed for England.

== Biography ==
Surety became the British 220 yards hurdles champion after winning the British AAA Championships title at the 1960 AAA Championships.

Surety married fellow athlete Valerie Cutting in 1961. He finished runner-up in the 440 yards hurdles behind Jussi Rintamäki at the 1961 AAA Championships and was the best placed British athlete at the 1962 AAA Championships and subsequently was considered British 440 yards hurdles champion.

He represented England in the 440 yards hurdles at the 1962 British Empire and Commonwealth Games in Perth, Western Australia.

He was a member of the Ilford Athletic Club and competed in the 1962 European Athletics Championships – Men's 400 metres hurdles.
