= Michael Palmer (athlete) =

British middle-distance runner (1935–1998)

Personal information
- Nationality: British (English)
- Born: 6 November 1935 St.Albans, England
- Died: 13 February 1998 (aged 62) St.Albans, England
- Height: 183 cm (6 ft 0 in)
- Weight: 72 kg (159 lb)

Sport
- Sport: Athletics
- Events: Steeplechase; Middle-distance running
- Club: St. Albans AC

Michael John Palmer (6 November 1935 – 13 February 1998) was a British middle-distance runner who competed at the 1960 Summer Olympics.

== Biography ==
Palmer finished third behind Eric Shirley in the steeplechase event at the 1960 AAA Championships. Later that year at the 1960 Olympic Games in Rome, he represented Great Britain in the men's 3000 metres steeplechase.

Palmer improved to second place behind Maurice Herriott at the 1961 AAA Championships.
