= Nick Overhead =

English sprinter

Personal information
- Nationality: British (English)
- Born: Fourth quarter 1942 Hemel Hempstead, England

Sport
- Sport: Athletics
- Event: 400 metres
- Club: Watford Harriers Club; Polytechnic Harriers

Nicholas John Overhead (born 1942), is a male former athlete who competed for England.

== Biography ==
Overhead represented the England team at the 1962 British Empire and Commonwealth Games in Perth, Australia. He competed in the 440 yards event.

He was a member of the Watford Harriers Club and later raced for the Polytechnic Harriers.
