= Jeff Julian (runner) =

New Zealand marathon runner (1935–2026)

- Julian in 1960

Personal information
- Full name: Jeffrey Lynn Julian
- Born: 9 October 1935 Taumarunui, New Zealand
- Died: 7 November 2026 (aged 91)
- Height: 1.72 m (5 ft 8 in)
- Weight: 60 kg (132 lb)

Sport
- Country: New Zealand
- Sport: Athletics
- Club: Owairaka
- Coached by: Arthur Lydiard

Achievements and titles
- National finals: Marathon champion (1963, 1968, 1969, 1970); Cross-country champion (1959, 1965)
- Personal best: Marathon 2:14:38

Jeffrey Lynn Julian (9 October 1935 – 7 November 2026) was a New Zealand marathon runner.

== Early life ==
Julian was born in Taumarunui on 9 October 1935.

== Athletics career ==
Julian trained under Arthur Lydiard and competed in the marathon at the 1960 Summer Olympics in Rome, where he finished 18th and four years later at the 1964 Summer Olympics in Tokyo, finishing in 29th place, Julian was disappointed not to be selected for the 1968 Summer Olympics and made an unsuccessful selection bid for the 1972 Summer Olympics.

He also competed in three Commonwealth Games, starting with the 1962 British Empire and Commonwealth Games, where he finished 7th in the marathon and 10th in the 6 mile event, four years later at the 1966 British Empire and Commonwealth Games he finished 5th in the marathon and for his final appearance he finished 18th in the marathon in Edinburgh at the 1970 British Commonwealth Games.

In 1963, he won the Fukuoka Marathon. In 1969 he ran his personal best of 2:14:38 h at the Fukuoka Marathon, ranking eighth.

== Fraud ==
After working for the Bank of New Zealand for 36 years, Julian lost his job. He then tried out some business ventures, including selling live aloe vera to farmers, but was stopped by the New Zealand government. In 2000, after six weeks on remand, he was sentenced to two years in prison for conspiracy to defraud between 1996 and 1998.

== Death ==
Julian died on 7 November 2026, at the age of 91.
