= Len Carter =

British sprinter (born 1942)

Personal information
- Nationality: British (English)
- Born: 21 November 1942 (age 83) Willesden, Middlesex, England

Sport
- Sport: Athletics
- Event: Sprints
- Club: Ruislip & Northwood AC
Medal record
Men's athletics
Representing England
British Empire and Commonwealth Games
| Gold medal – first place | 1962 Perth | 4 × 110 yd relay |

Leonard Walter Carter (born 21 November 1942) is a former British sprinter.

== Biography ==
Carter finished third behind Seraphino Antao in the 2220 yards event at the 1962 AAA Championships.

Later that year at the 1962 British Empire and Commonwealth Games, he won the gold medal with the England team in the 4 x 110 yards relay.

Carter would finish third again (this time behind Menzies Campbell) at the 1964 AAA Championships.
