= Trevor Burton (athlete) =

British pole vaulter

Personal information
- Nationality: British (English)
- Born: 24 January 1943 (age 83) Stoke, England

Sport
- Sport: Athletics
- Event: pole vault
- Club: City of Stoke AC; Cheimsford A.C

Trevor P. Burton (born 24 January 1943) is a retired male pole vaulter who competed for England.

== Biography ==
Burton was born in Stoke, England, and educated at St Joseph's College, Stoke-on-Trent.

Burton finished third behind Pentti Nikula in the pole vault event at the 1962 AAA Championships. He was also on the podium at both the 1964 AAA Championships and the 1965 AAA Championships and because he was the leading British athlete was considered the British pole vault champion.

He represented England in the pole vault, at the 1966 British Empire and Commonwealth Games in Kingston, Jamaica.

He was a member of the City of Stoke Athletic Club and the Chelmsford Athletic Club.
