= Athletics at the 1966 British Empire and Commonwealth Games – Men's 3000 metres steeplechase =

Steeplechase event

Men's 3000 metres steeplechase at the 1966 British Empire and Commonwealth Games
- Venue: Independence Park, Kingston
- Dates: August 6, 1966

Medalists
gold medal	Peter Welsh	New Zealand
silver medal	Kerry O'Brien	Australia
bronze medal	Benjamin Kogo	Kenya

The men's 3000 metres steeplechase event at the 1966 British Empire and Commonwealth Games was held on 6 August at the Independence Park in Kingston, Jamaica.

== Results ==
Final results
Rank	Name	Nationality	Time	Notes
1st place, gold medalist(s)	Peter Welsh	New Zealand	8:29.44	
2nd place, silver medalist(s)	Kerry O'Brien	Australia	8:32.58	
3rd place, bronze medalist(s)	Benjamin Kogo	Kenya	8:32.81	
4	Maurice Herriott	England	8:33.2	
5	Ian Blackwood	Australia	8:41.4	
6	Ernest Pomfret	England	8:41.6	
7	John Linaker	Scotland	8:41.6	
8	Naftali Chirchir	Kenya	8:47.4	
9	Joseph Stewart	Scotland	8:57.0	
10	Gerald Stevens	England	9:01.2	
11	Omari Abdallah	Tanzania	9:14.0	
12	Dilbagh Singh Kler	Malaysia	9:53.2	
	George Kerr	Jamaica	DNS	
