= Sid Purkis =

Male athlete

Personal information
- Nationality: British (English)
- Born: 10 May 1938 Romford, east London, England
- Died: 21 December 2008 (aged 70) Wickford, Essex, England

Sport
- Sport: Athletics
- Event: middle distance
- Club: Romford AC; Thurrock Harriers

Sidney George Purkis (10 May 1938 – 21 December 2008), was a male athlete who competed for England.

== Biography ==
Purkis was born in Romford, east London, England and joined Romford Athletics Club in 1956.

Purkis finished second behind Cary Weisiger in the 880 yards event at the 1962 AAA Championships. As the best placed British athlete he was considered the British 880 yards champion.

Shortly afterwards he represented Great Britain in the 1962 European Athletics Championships in the Men's 800 metres. Later the same year he represented England in the 880 yards at the 1962 British Empire and Commonwealth Games in Perth, Western Australia.

Purkis later joined Thurrock Harriers.
