= Eddie Strong =

British long-distance runner

Personal information
- Nationality: British (English)
- Born: 2 June 1936 (age 90) Somerset, England

Sport
- Sport: Athletics
- Event: Middle distance
- Club: Bristol AC

Edward Frank Strong (born 2 June 1936), is a male former athlete who competed for England.

== Biography ==
Strong represented the England team at the 1962 British Empire and Commonwealth Games in Perth, Australia. He competed in the 3 miles event.

He competed in the 1962 European Athletics Championships – Men's 5000 metres.

He was a member of the Bristol Athletics Club.
