= 1961 AAA Championships =

Outdoor track and field competition

- Dates: 14–15 July 1961
- Host city: London, England
- Venue: White City Stadium
- Level: Senior
- Type: Outdoor

The 1961 AAA Championships was the 1961 edition of the annual outdoor track and field competition organised by the Amateur Athletic Association (AAA). It was held from 14 to 15 July 1961 at White City Stadium in London, England.

== Summary ==
The Championships covered two days of competition. The marathon was held in Enfield and the decathlon event was held in Loughborough.

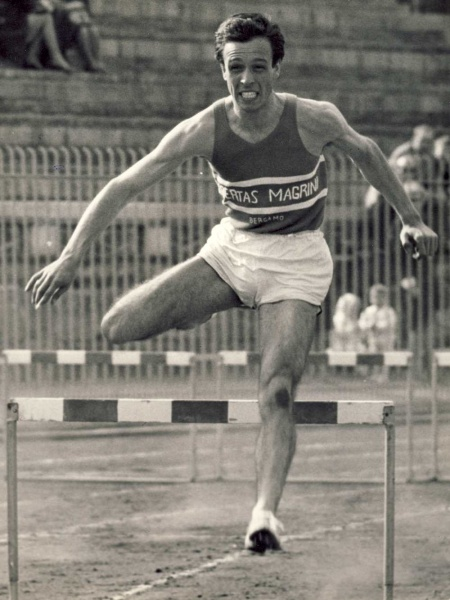
Salvatore Morale

== Results ==
Event	Gold		Silver		Bronze	
100 yards	(Canada) Harry Jerome	9.63	Seraphino Antao	9.84	David Jones	9.89
220 yards	David Jones	21.46	(Scotland) Mike Hildrey	21.53	(Nigeria) Abdul Karim Amu	21.69
440 yards	Adrian Metcalfe	47.49	Barry Jackson	47.89	Ken Wilcock	48.13
880 yards	George Kerr	1:51.59	(Republic of Ireland) Ron Delany	1:51.87	(Finland) Olavi Salonen	1:51.90
1 mile	(France) Michel Bernard	4:05.82	Ken Wood	4:06.52	Stan Taylor	4:06.66
3 miles	Gordon Pirie	13:31.10	Brian Hill-Cottingham	13:39.91	Mike Bullivant	13:45.44
6 miles	(Australia) Dave Power	27:57.8	Basil Heatley	28:03.0	Stan Eldon	28:13.4
10 miles	Basil Heatley	47:47.0 WR	Job Mayatt	49:58.8	Terence Smith	50:19.0
marathon	Brian Kilby	2:24:37	Brian Cooke	2:26:03	Ron Franklin	2:28:50
steeplechase	Maurice Herriott	8:53.6	Michael Palmer	9:00.2	Ben Grubb	9:02.8
120y hurdles	(Italy) Nereo Svara	14.4	Bob Birrell	14.5	(South Africa) Jacobus Malan	14.6
220y hurdles	(Italy) Salvatore Morale	23.9	(Australia) Dave Prince	24.3	(South Africa) Danie Burger	24.4
440y hurdles	(Finland) Jussi Rintamäki	51.46	Chris Surety	52.30	John Cooper	53.24
2 miles walk	Ken Matthews	13:24.6	(Italy) Pino Dordoni	13:45.0	Colin Williams	14:12.8
7 miles walk	Ken Matthews	49:43.6	Colin Williams	53:08.4	John Godbeer	53:20.0
high jump	(Scotland) Crawford Fairbrother	2.060 NR	(Australia) Colin Ridgway	2.007	(Scotland) Patrick Mackenzie	1.981
pole vault	(Finland) Risto Ankio	4.42	Rex Porter	3.96	(Scotland) Richard Malcolm	3.96
long jump	(Nigeria) John Oladitan	7.41	John Howell	7.31	Fred Alsop	7.24
triple jump	Fred Alsop	15.37	Mahoney Samuels	15.02	(Nigeria) John Eziashi	14.72
shot put	Arthur Rowe	18.58	(Hungary) Vilmos Varjú	17.84	Martyn Lucking	17.21
discus throw	(South Africa) Elfranco Malan	56.03	(Netherlands) Cees Koch	55.16	(Australia) Len Chinnery	50.08
hammer throw	(Republic of Ireland) John Lawlor	61.37	Howard Payne	59.07	(Australia) Robert Brown	56.33
javelin throw	(France) Michel Macquet	77.12	(Finland) Väinö Kuisma	73.81	John Greasley	70.64
decathlon	(South Africa) Danie Burger	6364	(Scotland) George McLachlan	5777	(Scotland) John Jones	5520

== See also ==
- 1961 WAAA Championships
