= Canada at the 1962 British Empire and Commonwealth Games =

- CG code: CAN
- CGA: Commonwealth Games Canada
- Website: commonwealthgames.ca

in Perth, Western Australia
- Flag bearers: Opening: Closing:
- Medals Ranked 5thth: Gold 4 Silver 12 Bronze 15 Total 31

British Empire and Commonwealth Games appearances
- 1930; 1934; 1938; 1950; 1954; 1958; 1962; 1966; 1970; 1974; 1978; 1982; 1986; 1990; 1994; 1998; 2002; 2006; 2010; 2014; 2018; 2022; 2026; 2030

Other related appearances
- Newfoundland (1930, 1934)

Canada competed at the 1962 British Empire and Commonwealth Games in Perth, Western Australia, from 22 November to 1 December 1962.

== Medallists ==
Medal	Name	Sport	Event	Date
Gold	Bruce Kidd	Athletics	Men's 6 miles	24 November
Bronze	Bruce Kidd	Athletics	Men's 3 miles	26 November
Bronze	David Steen	Athletics	Men's shot put	29 November

== Athletics ==
Men
Track & road events

Athlete	Event	Round 1		Round 2		Semifinal		Final	
Athlete	Event	Result	Rank	Result	Rank	Result	Rank	Result	Rank
Lynn Eves	100 yd	9.9	3 Q	10.2	5	Did not advance			
Robert Fisher-Smith	100 yd	10.0	4 Q	10.3	5	Did not advance			
Harry Jerome	100 yd	9.4	1 Q	9.6	1 Q	9.5	2 Q	10.0	6
Lynn Eves	220 yd	22.1	2 Q	22.0	3 Q	21.7	6	Did not advance	
Robert Fisher-Smith	220 yd	22.4	4 Q	23.0	6	Did not advance			
Harry Jerome	220 yd	DNS		Did not advance					
Bill Crothers	440 yd	48.4	2 Q	—N/a		48.2	5	Did not advance	
Don Bertoia	880 yd	1:53.3	3	—N/a		Did not advance			
Bill Crothers	880 yd	1:51.4	1 Q	—N/a		1:52.3	5	Did not advance	
Hylke van der Wal	880 yd	DNS		—N/a		Did not advance			
Don Bertoia	1 mile	4:19.0	7	—N/a				Did not advance	
Jim Irons	1 mile	4:10.8	3 Q	—N/a				4:17.4	8
Bruce Kidd	1 mile	DNS		—N/a				Did not advance	
Hylke van der Wal	1 mile	4:18.6	7	—N/a				Did not advance	
Bruce Kidd	3 miles	—N/a						13:36.4	3rd place, bronze medalist(s)
Bruce Kidd	6 miles	—N/a						28:26.6 GR	1st place, gold medalist(s)
George Shepherd	440 yd hurdles	54.3	5	—N/a				Did not advance	
Hylke van der Wal	3000 m steeplechase	—N/a						9:26.0	8
Don Bertoia; Bill Crothers; Lynn Eves; George Shepherd	4×440 yd relay	3:15.2	3 Q	—N/a				3:20.6	6
Gordon Dickson	Marathon	—N/a						2:44:17	12
Bruce Kidd	Marathon	—N/a						DNF	

Field events

Athlete	Event	Final	
Athlete	Event	Distance	Rank
Alf Groom	Pole vault	13 ft 0 in (3.96 m)	9
Gerry Moro	Pole vault	14 ft 3 in (4.34 m)	4
Bob Watson	Pole vault	14 ft 0 in (4.27 m)	6
David Steen	Shot put	58 ft 8 3/4 in (17.90 m)	3rd place, bronze medalist(s)
Gerry Moro	Discus throw	DNS	

Women
Track events

Athlete	Event	Round 1		Semifinal		Final	
Athlete	Event	Result	Rank	Result	Rank	Result	Rank
Yvonne Breeden	100 yd	11.4	3 Q	11.5	6	Did not advance	
Yvonne Breeden	220 yd	25.3	3 Q	25.5	6	Did not advance	
Abby Hoffman	880 yd	—N/a				2:21.6	7

Field events

Athlete	Event	Final	
Athlete	Event	Distance	Rank
Pat Dobie	Discus throw	130 ft 11 in (39.90 m)	7
Pat Dobie	Javelin throw	145 ft 9 1/2 in (44.44 m)	5

== See also ==
- Canada at the 1960 Summer Olympics
- Canada at the 1964 Summer Olympics
