= Dave Chapman (athlete) =

British middle-distance runner (born 1936)

Personal information
- Nationality: British (English)
- Born: 21 August 1936 (age 89) Walthamstow, London, England
- Height: 175 cm (5 ft 9 in)
- Weight: 67 kg (148 lb)

Sport
- Sport: Athletics
- Event: Middle-distance / Steeplechase
- Club: Woodford Green AC

David John Chapman (born 21 August 1936) is a British middle-distance runner who competed at the 1960 Summer Olympics.

== Biography ==
Chapman finished second behind Eric Shirley in the 3,000 metres steeplechase event at the 1960 AAA Championships At the 1960 Olympic Games in Rome, he represented Great Britain in the men's 3000 metres steeplechase.

Chapman finished second again, this time behind Maurice Herriott at the 1962 AAA Championships. He also represented England in the 3,000 metres steeplechase at the 1962 British Empire and Commonwealth Games in Perth, Western Australia.
