= John Kitching (athlete) =

English athlete

Personal information
- Nationality: British (English)
- Born: 10 December 1934 Colombo, Ceylon
- Died: 27 December 2020 (aged 85)

Sport
- Sport: Athletics
- Event: High jump / javelin throw
- Club: Burgess Hill AC; Cambridge University AC; Achilles Club

John Kitching (10 December 1934 – 27 December 2020) was a male athlete who competed for England and specialised in high jump and the javelin throw.

== Biography ==
Kitching was educated at Nuwara Eliya before moving to England and attending Brunswick School, Tonbridge School and then Manor House School. He won a scholarship to Trinity Hall, Cambridge and was later a member of the Achilles Club.

Kitching completed his National Service with the Royal Air Force and underwent pilot training in Canada. He returned to the United Kingdom in 1955 and trained at RAF Driffield and RAF Pembrey battle school, becoming a Flying Officer. He gained his athletics Blue in 1957.

He represented the England athletics team in the high jump at the 1958 British Empire and Commonwealth Games in Cardiff, Wales.

Kitching finished third behind John McSorley in the javelin throw event at the 1962 AAA Championships.

After Cambridge, Kitching went to Stanford Business School on a Harkness Scholarship, returning once again to the UK to work for McKinsey and then Standard Telephones. He later became a consultant and worked in Boston, Monaco, Berlin and Davos. He was a Governor of Tonbridge and Chairman of the Development Board at Trinity Hall.
