= John Oladipo Oladitan =

Nigerian long jumper (1930–2002)

Personal information
- Nationality: Nigerian
- Born: 28 November 1930 Ibadan, British Nigeria
- Died: 17 June 2002 (aged 71) Ibadan, Nigeria

Sport
- Sport: Athletics
- Event: Long jump

John Oladipo Oladitan (28 November 1930 – 17 June 2002) was a Nigerian athlete. He competed in the men's long jump at the 1960 Summer Olympics.

Oladitan won the British AAA Championships title in the long jump event at the 1961 AAA Championships.
