= John Anderson (runner) =

English runner

Personal information
- Nationality: British (England)
- Born: 1936 (age 89–90) Gateshead, England

Sport
- Sport: Athletics
- Event: Middle-distance
- Club: Saltwell Harriers

John Paul Anderson (born 1936), is a male former athlete who competed for England.

== Biography ==
Anderson represented the England team in the 3 miles race at the 1962 British Empire and Commonwealth Games in Perth, Western Australia.

He finished sixth in the 1962 European Athletics Championships – Men's 5000 metres.

He was a member of the Saltwell Harriers Club, where he remained unbeaten for eight-years and was club champion in 1957, 1958, 1959, 1961 and 1962. In addition he won the 1963 North of England champion in the 10,000 metres and was Northumberland and Durham champion.
