= Brian Hall (athlete) =

British athlete

Personal information
- Nationality: British (English)
- Born: 20 August 1937 Manchester, England
- Died: 30 August 2010 (aged 73)

Sport
- Sport: Athletics
- Event: middle distance
- Club: Manchester & District Lads Club Harriers

Brian Hall (20 August 1937 – 30 August 2010), was a male athlete who competed for England.

== Biography ==
Hall was born in Manchester, ran cross country at school and joined the Manchester & District Lads Club Harriers.

Hall finished second behind another Mancunian Stan Taylor in the 1 mile event at the 1962 AAA Championships.

Later that year, Hall represented England in the 3,000m Steeplechase and the 1 mile race at the 1962 British Empire and Commonwealth Games in Perth, Western Australia.

In 1972, he moved to Winsford with his family and later founded the Winsford Athletics Club (which later merged to become the Vale Royal Athletics Club). He helped improve the facilities at their base at the Knights Grange sports complex in Winsford. He was also an elected councillor to both Winsford Town Council and Vale Royal Borough Council.
