= Austin Verner =

English swimmer (born 1943)

Personal information
- Nationality: British (English)
- Born: 7 March 1943 (age 83) Manchester, England

Sport
- Sport: Swimming
- Event: Freestyle
- Club: Urmston SC

Austin David Verner (born 7 March 1943), is a male former swimmer who competed for England.

== Biography ==
Verner represented the England team at the 1962 British Empire and Commonwealth Games in Perth, Western Australia. He competed in the 440 yards freestyle event.

He swam for the Urmston Swimming Club.
