= Roddy Frame (swimmer) =

English swimmer

Personal information
- Nationality: British (English)
- Born: Fourth quarter 1941 York, England
- Height: 5 ft 8 in (173 cm)
- Weight: 14 st (196 lb; 89 kg)

Sport
- Sport: Swimming
- Event: Medley
- Club: York City SC

Roderick "Roddy" I. Frame (born 1941) is a male former swimmer who competed for England.

== Biography ==
Frame represented the England team at the 1962 British Empire and Commonwealth Games in Perth, Western Australia. he competed in the 110 yards butterfly event.

He was a member of the York City Swimming Club.
