= Bob Setti =

British athlete (1938–2005)

Personal information
- Born: 31 October 1938 Hammersmith, London, England
- Died: 11 June 2005 (aged 76) Dorset, England

Sport
- Sport: Athletics
- Event: 400/800 metres
- Club: Herne Hill Harriers
Medal record
Athletics
Representing England
British Empire & Commonwealth Games
Silver medal – second place	1962 Perth	4 x 440y relay

Robert Edward Francis Setti (31 October 1938 – 11 June 2005) was an English relay rafer.

== Biography ==
Setti was born on 31 October 1938, in Hammersmith, London and was a member of the Herne Hill Harriers, where he was awarded the best junior athlete of the year for 1957.

He represented the England team and won a silver medal in the 4 x 440y relay event at the 1962 British Empire and Commonwealth Games in Perth, Western Australia, with Adrian Metcalfe, Barry Jackson and Robbie Brightwell.
