= Sue Platt =

British former track and field athlete (born 1940)

Personal information
- Nationality: British (English)
- Born: 4 October 1940 (age 85) England
- Height: 174 cm (5 ft 9 in)
- Weight: 63 kg (139 lb)

Sport
- Sport: Athletics
- Event: Javelin
- Club: London Olympiades AC
Medal record
Representing England
Women's Athletics
British Empire and Commonwealth Games
Gold medal – first place	1962 Perth	Javelin throw

Susan Mary Platt (born 4 October 1940) is a British former track and field athlete who competed for England and Great Britain in the javelin throw. She was a three-time Olympian and competed three times at the British Empire and Commonwealth Games. She had a personal best of 55.60 m (182 ft 4 3/4 in) and was Commonwealth champion in 1962.

== Biography ==
Born and educated at Copthall County Grammar School in Mill Hill in the London suburb of Barnet, she joined the London Olympiades athletics club, which was the country's leading all-women's club. Platt emerged at national level in 1958 when finishing third behind Averil Williams in the javelin event at the 1958 WAAA Championships.

The following year Platt became the national javelin champion after winning the British WAAA Championships title at the 1959 WAAA Championships. She went on to take nine national titles in women's javelin at the WAAA Championships (one of them as best placed British athlete in 1964). She also took three titles at the regional South of England Championships.

Platt made three appearances at the Summer Olympics – 1960, 1964 and 1968 – being Great Britain's leading female javelin thrower in the 1960s. Her best finish and performance was on her debut in 1960, where she came seventh with a mark of 51.01 m (167 ft 4 1/4 in). She was among the best throwers of the period outside of Eastern Europe. She performed poorly at the 1962 European Athletics Championships, however, coming last in qualifying.

She was a three-time participant for England at the British Empire and Commonwealth Games. Her first outing in 1958 saw her finish in fourth place, one spot behind England teammate Averil Williams, but over ten metres behind winner Anna Pazera, who set a world record. With a throw of 50.26 m (164 ft 10 1/2 in), Platt topped the podium at the 1962 games, where Pazera fell to third in the rankings and Rosemary Morgan made it a 1–2 for England. Platt also competed in the shot put at that event, coming eighth in the final. In her third and final appearance for England, Platt placed sixth overall.

== International competitions ==
Year	Competition	Venue	Position	Event	Notes
1958	British Empire and Commonwealth Games	Cardiff, Wales	4th	Javelin throw	45.38 m
1960	Olympic Games	Rome, Italy	7th	Javelin throw	51.01 m
1962	European Championships	Belgrade, Yugoslavia	14th (q)	Javelin throw	44.17 m
1962	British Empire and Commonwealth Games	Perth, Western Australia	8th	Shot put	11.53 m
1962	British Empire and Commonwealth Games	Perth, Western Australia	1st	Javelin throw	50.26 m
1964	Olympic Games	Tokyo, Japan	9th	Javelin throw	48.59 m
1966	British Empire and Commonwealth Games	Kingston, Jamaica	6th	Javelin throw	42.27 m
1968	Olympic Games	Mexico City, Mexico	15th	Javelin throw	48.52 m

== National titles ==
- Women's AAA Championships
  - Javelin throw: 1959, 1960, 1961, 1962, 1964, 1966, 1967, 1968, 1969
- South of England Championships
  - Javelin throw: 1960, 1961, 1964
