= John Sheldrick =

British discus thrower

Personal information
- Nationality: British (English)
- Born: 27 June 1939 (age 87) Newmarket, England

Sport
- Sport: Athletics
- Event: Shot put / Discus throw / Hammer throw
- Club: Thames Valley Harriers
Medal record
Athletics
Representing England
British Empire & Commonwealth Games
Bronze medal – third place	1962 Perth	discus

John William Sheldrick (born 1939), is a male former athlete who competed for England.

== Biography ==
Sheldrick was a member of the Thames Valley Harriers.

He represented the England team at the 1962 British Empire and Commonwealth Games in Perth, Australia. He competed in the throwing events, winning a bronze medal in the discus throw.

During the Games he met his future wife Prue O'Connor and stayed in Australia, therefore officially emigrating. Together they had five sons.
