= Murray Halberg =

New Zealand athlete and philanthropist (1933–2022)

Sir Murray Halberg ONZ MBE
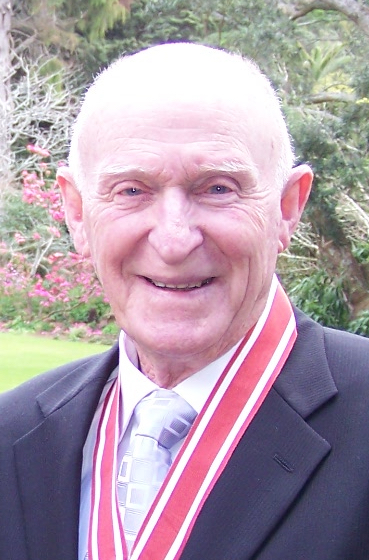
- Halberg in 2008

Personal information
- Born: Murray Gordon Halberg; 7 July 1933 Eketāhuna, New Zealand
- Died: 30 November 2022 (aged 89) Auckland, New Zealand

Sport
- Country: New Zealand
- Sport: Track and field
- Coached by: Bert Payne; Arthur Lydiard

Achievements and titles
- Personal bests: 1 mile: 3:57.5 (1958); 2 miles: 8:30.0 WR (1961); 3 miles: 13.10.0 WR (1961); 5000 m: 13:35.2 (1961); 10,000 m: 28:33.0 (1964); 4 x 1 mile relay: 16.23.8 WR (1961) (with Gary Philpott, Barry Magee & Peter Snell)
Medal record
Men's athletics
Representing New Zealand
Olympic Games
Gold medal – first place	1960 Rome	5000 metres
Commonwealth Games
Gold medal – first place	1958 Cardiff	3 miles
Gold medal – first place	1962 Perth	3 miles

Sir Murray Gordon Halberg ONZ MBE (7 July 1933 – 30 November 2022) was a New Zealand middle-distance runner who won the gold medal in the 5000 metres event at the 1960 Olympics. He also won gold medals in the 3 miles events at the 1958 and 1962 Commonwealth Games. He worked for the welfare of children with disabilities since he founded the Halberg Trust in 1963.

== Biography ==
Born in Eketāhuna on 7 July 1933, Halberg later moved to Ōwairaka in Auckland, and attended Avondale College. He was a rugby player in his youth, but suffered a severe injury during a game, leaving his left arm withered. The next year, he took up running, seemingly being only more motivated by his disability. In 1951, he met Arthur Lydiard, who became his coach. Lydiard had been a famous long-distance runner, and had new ideas on the training of athletes. Three years later, Halberg broke through, winning his first national title on the senior level.

At the 1954 British Empire and Commonwealth Games he placed fifth in the mile. At the 1956 Olympics in Melbourne, Australia, he placed eleventh in the 1500 metres. Halberg won the gold medal in the three miles at the 1958 British Empire and Commonwealth Games and later the same year became the first sub four-minute miler from New Zealand. He won the New Zealand Sportsman of the Year for 1958.

For the 1960 Rome Olympics, Halberg focused on the longer distances, entering in the 5000 and 10000 m. Halberg won the 5000 m gold, on the same day countryman Peter Snell was victorious in the 800 m. Halberg later placed fifth in the 10,000 m.

The following year, Halberg set four world records in events over imperial distances. After carrying the flag at the opening ceremonies, Halberg successfully defended his three-mile title at the 1962 British Empire and Commonwealth Games. He closed out his running career at the 1964 Summer Olympics in Tokyo, finishing seventh in the 10,000 m.

In the 1961 New Year Honours, Halberg was appointed a Member of the Order of the British Empire, for services to athletics. In the 1988 New Year Honours, he was appointed a Knight Bachelor, for services to sport and crippled children. In the 2008 Queen's Birthday Honours, Halberg was appointed to the Order of New Zealand. The following month he became only the fourth person to be awarded the Blake Medal, named after fellow countryman Sir Peter Blake, for his more than 50 years' service to athletics, and to children with disabilities. In 1963 he set up The Halberg Trust, which supports children with disabilities to be active in sport, creation and leisure. The organisation rebranded in 2012 to become the Halberg Disability Sport Foundation. For many years the organisation has managed the New Zealand Sportsman of the Year Award, which is now called the Halberg Awards.

Halberg House of Hutt International Boys' School is named after Sir Murray Halberg, and students in the house earn what are called "meter points" which relates to Sir Murray Halberg and his running career. Tauranga Boys' College also named a house after Sir Murray Halberg. Halberg Crescent, in the Hamilton suburb of Chartwell, is named in Halberg's honour.

== Personal life ==
According to a Stuff obituary, Halberg worked as a teacher, industrial chemist and shop worker, but "found his calling with his founding in 1963 of the Halberg Trust for Crippled Children, which became the Halberg Disability Sport Foundation".

He managed a soft furnishing business before moving to Waiheke Island, where he worked in a hardware store. Halberg lived in Auckland city and Waiheke Island. He died on Waiheke Island on 30 November 2022, at the age of 89. He is survived by his wife Phyllis and three children, Greta, Carl and Stefan.

== Bibliography ==
- A Clean Pair Of Heels: The Murray Halberg Story by Murray Halberg, with Garth Gilmour

Sporting positions
Preceded by (Soviet Union) Pyotr Bolotnikov	Men's 5000 m best year performance 1961–1962	Succeeded by (Soviet Union) Pyotr Bolotnikov
Awards
New award	Lonsdale Cup of the New Zealand Olympic Committee; 1961	Succeeded by Peter Snell
Preceded by Jock Hobbs	Leadership Award; 2011	Succeeded by John Wells
