= 1962 AAA Championships =

Outdoor track and field competition

- Dates: 13–14 July 1962
- Host city: London, England
- Venue: White City Stadium
- Level: Senior
- Type: Outdoor

The 1962 AAA Championships was the 1962 edition of the annual outdoor track and field competition organised by the Amateur Athletic Association (AAA). It was held from 13 to 14 July 1962 at White City Stadium in London, England.

== Summary ==
The Championships covered two days of competition. The marathon was held in Welwyn Garden City and the decathlon event was held in Loughborough. The 220 yards hurdles was held for the last time.

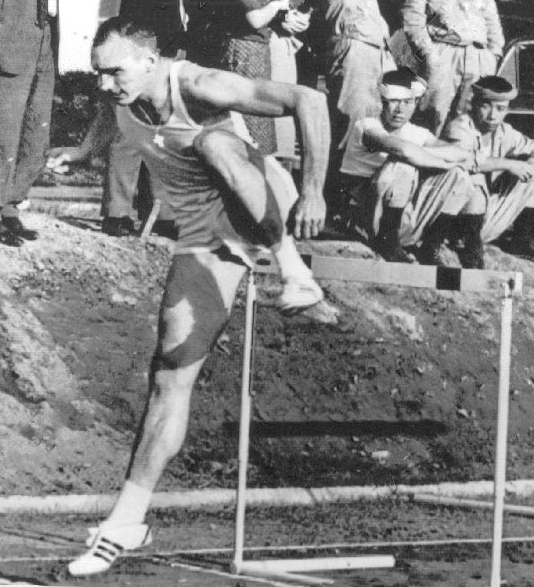
Blaine Lindgren won two titles including the last ever 220 yards hurdles event

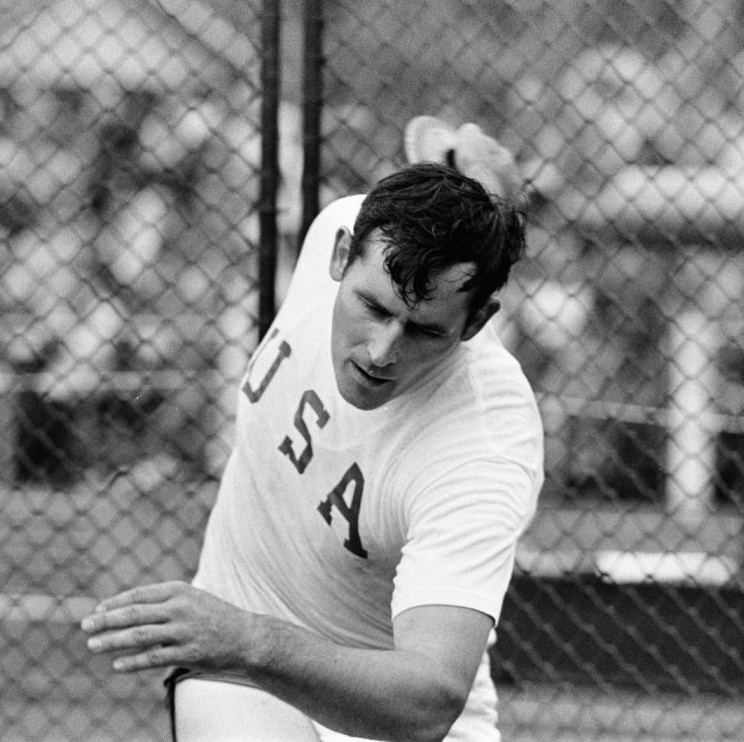
Jay Silvester won both the discus and shot

== Results ==
Event	Gold		Silver		Bronze	
100 yards	Seraphino Antao	9.8	Peter Radford	9.9	(Wales) Berwyn Jones	9.9
220 yards	Seraphino Antao	21.1	David Jones	21.4	Len Carter	21.8
440 yards	Robbie Brightwell	45.9 ER	(South Africa) Brian Davis	46.5	Ken Wilcock	47.2
880 yards	(United States) Cary Weisiger	1:50.1	Sid Purkis	1:50.3	(Wales) Tony Harris	1:50.4
1 mile	Stan Taylor	4:04.8	Brian Hall	4:05.0	Ken Smith	4:05.2
3 miles	Bruce Tulloh	13:16.0	(Canada) Bruce Kidd	13:17.0	Derek Ibbotson	13:23.4
6 miles	Roy Fowler	27:49.8 NR	Mike Bullivant	27:49.8 =NR	Martin Hyman	27:52.0
10 miles	(United States) Buddy Edelen	48:31.8	Mel Batty	48:38.0	Gerry North	48:38.2
marathon	Brian Kilby	2:26:15	(Scotland) Alastair Wood	2:26:35	Mel Batty	2:28:10
steeplechase	Maurice Herriott	8:43.8	Dave Chapman	8:46.4	Ernie Pomfret	8:54.0
120y hurdles	(United States) Blaine Lindgren	14.2	Laurie Taitt	14.3	(Nigeria) Alfred Belleh	14.7
220y hurdles	(United States) Blaine Lindgren	23.9	(United States) Russ Rogers	24.5	Raymond Barnes	25.1
440y hurdles	(United States) Russ Rogers	51.0	(Finland) Jussi Rintamäki	51.1	(South Africa) Neil MacDonald	51.9
2 miles walk	Ken Matthews	13:59.0	Colin Williams	14:26.2	John Northcott	14:32.0
7 miles walk	Colin Williams	52:15.0	Arthur Thomson	52:47.2	Ray Middleton	53:50.4
high jump	(Japan) Kuniyoshi Sugioka	2.096	(Australia) Colin Ridgway	2.032	(Scotland) Crawford Fairbrother	2.007
pole vault	(Finland) Pentti Nikula	4.65	(United States) Dave Tork	4.57	Trevor Burton	4.21
long jump	(Finland) Jorma Valkama	7.65	John Howell	7.54	(Japan) Takayuki Okazaki	7.52
triple jump	(Japan) Tomio Ota	15.66	(Japan) Koji Sakurai	15.65	Mike Ralph	15.56
shot put	(United States) Jay Silvester	18.18	Martyn Lucking	17.55	(South Africa) Hannes Botha	17.28
discus throw	(United States) Jay Silvester	60.85	(South Africa) Elfranco Malan	56.71	(Finland) Carol Lindroos	55.73
hammer throw	(Japan) Noboru Okamoto	62.19	Howard Payne	61.24	Peter Allday	57.57
javelin throw	John McSorley	79.25 NR	Clive Loveland	71.97	John Kitching	69.74
decathlon	(Australia) Zlatko Sumich	6237	(Scotland) George McLachlan	6184 NR	(Australia) John Montgomery	5792

== See also ==
- 1962 WAAA Championships
