= Michael Bullivant =

British long-distance runner

Personal information
- Nationality: British (English)
- Born: 1 March 1934 (age 92) Derby, England
- Height: 183 cm (6 ft 0 in)
- Weight: 67 kg (148 lb)

Sport
- Sport: Athletics
- Event: Long-distance running
- Club: Derby & County AC

Michael John Bullivant (born 1 March 1934) is a former British long-distance runner who competed at the 1964 Summer Olympics.

== Biography ==
Bullivant was a member of the Derby County & AC and won the Derbyshire six mile title in 1957 and 1958.

He represented England athletics team in the 3 miles race at the 1958 British Empire and Commonwealth Games in Cardiff, Wales and the following year Bullivant finished third behind Stan Eldon in the 6 miles event at the 1959 AAA Championships.

Bullivant finished third behind Gordon Pirie in the 3 miles event at the 1961 AAA Championships and runner-up to Roy Fowler in the 6 miles at the 1962 AAA Championships. Later in 1962 he represented the England team in the 6 miles race at the 1962 British Empire and Commonwealth Games in Perth, Western Australia.

Bullivant became the British 6 miles champion after winning the British AAA Championships title at the 1964 AAA Championships and at the 1964 Olympic Games in Tokyo, he represented Great Britain in the men's 10,000 metres.
