= Stan Taylor (athlete) =

British athlete

Personal information
- Nationality: British (English)
- Born: 1937 (age 88–89)

Sport
- Sport: Athletics
- Event: middle distance
- Club: Manchester AC

Stanley George Taylor (born 1937), is an athletics coach and a former athlete who competed for England.

== Biography ==
Taylor finished second behind Michel Bernard in the 1 mile event at the 1961 AAA Championships and then became the British 1 mile champion after winning the British AAA Championships title at the 1962 AAA Championships.

Taylor represented England in the 880 yards and 1 mile races at the 1962 British Empire and Commonwealth Games in Perth, Western Australia. He alson finished third in the 1962 Emsley Car Mile held at the White City Stadium.

He became a coach at Manchester Harriers (formerly Manchester AC) and then Blackpool and Wyre & Fylde AC, the latter with who he was still coaching into his eighties and was treasurer from 1990 to 2005.
