= Rosemary Morgan =

British javelin thrower

Personal information
- Nationality: British (English)
- Born: 25 August 1941 (age 84)

Sport
- Sport: Athletics
- Event: javelin
- Club: Ilford AC
Medal record
Athletics
Representing England
British Empire & Commonwealth Games
Silver medal – second place	1962 Perth	Javelin

Rosemary M Morgan (born 1941) is a former athlete who competed for England.

== Biography ==
Morgan finished second behind Sue Platt in the javelin event at the 1961 WAAA Championships and the 1962 WAAA Championships.

Later in 1962, she represented England and won a silver medal in the javelin at the 1962 British Empire and Commonwealth Games in Perth, Western Australia.

She was a member of the Ilford Athletic Club and returned to form in 1967 when she finished second behind Sue Platt in the javelin event at the 1967 WAAA Championships.
