= Ian Sinfield (athlete) =

Australian long-distance runner

Personal information
- Nationality: Australian
- Born: 3 October 1934 London, England
- Died: 12 March 2010 (aged 75) Perth, Australia

Sport
- Sport: Long-distance running
- Event: Marathon

Ian Sinfield (3 October 1934 – 12 March 2010) was an Australian long-distance runner. He competed in the marathon at the 1960 Summer Olympics.
