= Pascal Mfyomi =

Tanzanian long-distance runner

Pascal Mfyomi (2 July 1942 – before 2006) was a Tanzanian athlete who competed in the 1964 Olympics in Tokyo in the men's 10,000 meter race.
