= Peter Wilkinson (athlete) =

British athlete

Personal information
- Nationality: British (English)
- Born: 27 June 1933 Chesterfield, England
- Died: 28 March 2014 (aged 80) Toton, Nottinghamshire, England

Sport
- Sport: Athletics
- Event: Long-distance
- Club: Derby County & AC
Medal record
Athletics
Representing England
British Empire & Commonwealth Games
Bronze medal – third place	1958 Cardiff	marathon

Peter Alan Wilkinson (27 June 1933 – 28 March 2014) was a male athlete who competed for England.

== Biography ==
Wilkinson, a bank clerk in Chesterfield, was a member of the Derby County & AC and finished runner-up in the 1958 Derbyshire six mile championship and won the English national banks title.

He represented the England athletics team and won a bronze medal in the marathon at the 1958 British Empire and Commonwealth Games in Cardiff, Wales.
