= Maureen Wright =

Australian javelin thrower

Personal information
- Nationality: Australian
- Born: 20 October 1939 (age 86)

Sport
- Sport: Athletics
- Event: Javelin throw

Maureen Wright (born 20 October 1939) is an Australian athlete. She competed in the women's javelin throw at the 1956 Summer Olympics.
