= Barry Magee =

New Zealand long-distance runner (born 1934)

Barry Magee MNZM
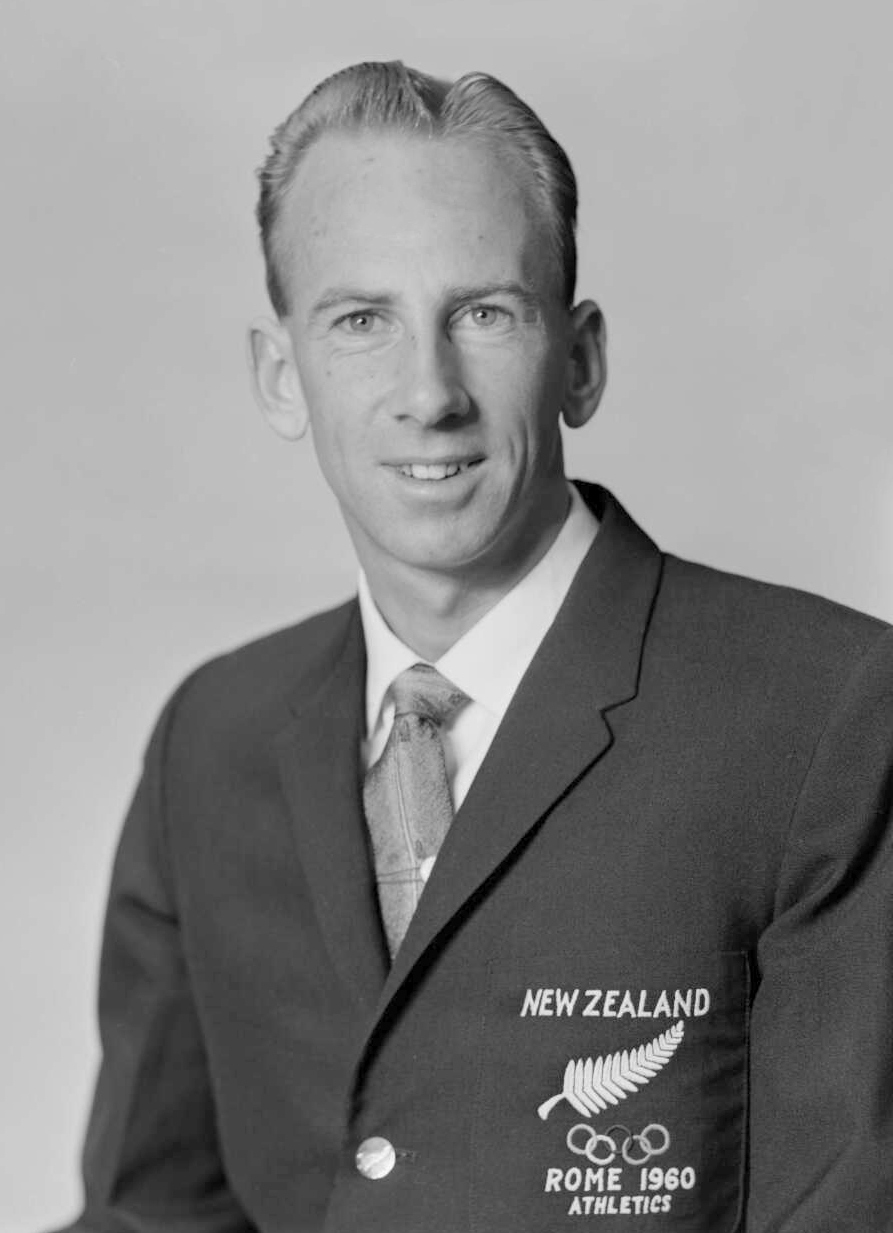
- Magee in 1960

Personal information
- Born: Arthur Barry Magee; 6 February 1934 (age 92) New Plymouth, New Zealand
- Height: 165 cm (5 ft 5 in)
- Weight: 57 kg (126 lb)

Sport
- Country: New Zealand
- Sport: Athletics
- Events: 5000 m, 10,000 m, marathon
- Club: Three Kings Athletic Club, Auckland
- Coached by: Gil Edwards; Arthur Lydiard

Achievements and titles
- Personal bests: 5000 m – 13:39.2 (1961); 10,000 m – 28:50.8 (1961); Marathon – 2:17:19 (1960)
Medal record
Representing New Zealand
Olympic Games
Bronze medal – third place	1960 Rome	Marathon

Arthur Barry Magee MNZM (born 6 February 1934) is a retired New Zealand long-distance runner. He won a bronze medal in the marathon at the 1960 Olympics and in the 10,000 m event placed 26th at the 1960 and 23rd at the 1964 games.

== Biography ==
Magee was one of the large group of athletes that New Zealand coach Arthur Lydiard used to revolutionise how the world trained for all sports. At the 1960 Olympic Games, Lydiard's pupils and Magee's training partners Murray Halberg and Peter Snell won gold medals over 5000 metres and 800 metres within one hour. Magee's bronze in the marathon further confirmed Lydiard's training methods. Magee went on to win many major international races, including the 1960 Fukuoka Marathon. But he was much more than a marathon runner; he also ran what were then the world's third-fastest time over 3 miles and fifth-fastest over 5000 metres. He also recorded the world's fastest 10,000 metres and second-fastest 5000 metres for 1961 and was part of New Zealand's world-record-breaking 4 × 1 mile relay team in 1961.

Magee always attributed his success to Lydiard, who had become something of a father figure after Magee's own father died in the same year that Lydiard started coaching him. After retiring from international competition, Magee coached several top runners himself; he currently has a number of high-achieving athletes under his wing, including former New Zealand cross country and mountain running champion Jonathan Jackson, and Lachlan Haitana, winner of the 2019 Huntly Half Marathon. Furthermore, many of his former athletes give him praise, attributing much of their success to the training that took place under his guidance at the BCG (Barry's Cricket Ground), Waitakeres (OTT/22 miler), and Lynfield (Lydiard's Hill Spring circuit).

In the 2002 Queen's Birthday and Golden Jubilee Honours, Magee was appointed a Member of the New Zealand Order of Merit for services to sport.

== Honorific eponym ==
Magee Place, in the Hamilton suburb of Chartwell, is named in Magee's honour.

== Quotes ==
- "Anyone can run 20 miles. It's the next six that count."
- "Speed kills, distance doesn't"
- "Train don't strain"
- "Hills are the shortcut to success"
- "There are horses for courses"
- "The backstraight is where boys become men"
- "The body can only do what the body is regularly accustomed to doing"
- Here's one of Barry's favourites and it is one of his twelve commandments: "Go straight to bed after training when you're sick"
