= John Baguley =

Australian triple and long jumper

John R. Baguley (born 30 June 1940) is an Australian former long jumper who competed in the 1960 Summer Olympics. He won a silver medal in the triple jump at the 1962 British Empire and Commonwealth Games.
