= Keith Ollerenshaw =

Australian long-distance runner

Keith Ollerenshaw (28 September 1928 – 15 March 2016) was an Australian long-distance runner who competed in the 1956 Summer Olympics.
