= Dave Power (runner) =

Australian long-distance runner

Personal information
- Born: David William Power; 14 July 1928 Maitland, New South Wales
- Died: 1 February 2014 (aged 85)
Medal record
Men's athletics
Representing Australia
Olympic Games
Bronze medal – third place	1960 Rome	Men's 10000 metres
Commonwealth Games
Gold medal – first place	1958 Cardiff	Men's 6 miles
Gold medal – first place	1958 Cardiff	Men's marathon

David William Power (14 July 1928 – 1 February 2014) was an Australian athlete who competed mainly in the 10,000 metres during his career.

== Biography ==
Born in Maitland, New South Wales, he competed for Australia in the 1956 Summer Olympics in Melbourne and the 1960 Summer Olympics held in Rome, Italy in the 10,000 metres where he won the bronze medal.

Quote by Herb Elliott, "Dave Power . . . is perhaps the most lion-hearted athlete I’ve known . . . " Website Racing Past says, "One of the greatest Australian runners between 1958 and 1962." Power won two gold medals at the 1958 British Empire and Commonwealth Games in Cardiff, Wales in the 6 mile and marathon races, and collected two silver medals in the same events at the 1962 British Empire and Commonwealth Games in Perth, Western Australia. At various periods of his career he was coached by Arthur Lydiard and Percy Cerutty, among others. He was inducted into the Sport Australia Hall of Fame in 1999.

Power won the British AAA Championships title at the 1961 AAA Championships.
