= Tony Cook (athlete) =

Australian long-distance runner

Personal information
- Full name: Anthony Cook
- Born: 18 September 1936 (age 89)
- Height: 183 cm (6 ft 0 in)
- Weight: 68 kg (150 lb)

Sport
- Country: Australia
- Sport: Athletics
- Club: Glenhuntly Athletics Club

Anthony Cook (born 18 September 1936) is an Australian former long-distance runner who competed in the 1964 Summer Olympics. He also competed at the 1962 and 1966 British Empire and Commonwealth Games.
