= Mel Batty =

British athlete

Personal information
- Nationality: British (English)
- Born: 9 April 1940 Grays, Essex, England
- Died: 29 August 2011 (aged 71)

Sport
- Sport: Athletics
- Event: long distance
- Club: Thurrock Harriers Club

Melvyn Richard Batty (9 April 1940 – 29 August 2011) was an athlete who competed for England.

== Biography ==
Batty finished second behind Buddy Edelen in the 10 miles event at the 1962 AAA Championships but because he was the highest placed British athlete he was considered the British 10 miles champion. He won that same race and title outright in the following two years. On the latter occasion, on 11 April 1964, he set a new world record for 10 miles, clocking a time of 47 minutes 26.8 seconds. The race took place at Hurlingham Park in London and his performance bettered the previous world record of 47:47, which had been set by fellow Briton Basil Heatley on the same track and championship three years earlier.

He represented England in the 3,000m steeplechase, 6 miles and marathon at the 1962 British Empire and Commonwealth Games in Perth, Western Australia.

He was a member of the Thurrock Harriers Club, and won two English National Cross Country Championships in 1964 and 1965.

He later coached Eamonn Martin. He suffered a heart attack on 19 August 2011 and died 10 days later.
