= Ron Blackney =

Australian middle-distance runner

Personal information
- Full name: Ronald Leslie Blackney
- Nationality: Australian
- Born: 23 April 1933
- Died: 14 June 2008 (aged 75)

Sport
- Sport: Middle-distance running
- Event: Steeplechase

Ronald Leslie Blackney (23 April 1933 – 14 June 2008) was an Australian middle-distance runner. He competed in the men's 3000 metres steeplechase at the 1956 Summer Olympics.
