= Maurice Herriott =

British track and field athlete (1939–2026)

Personal information
- Nationality: British (English)
- Born: 8 October 1939 Great Wyrley, England
- Died: 24 August 2026 (aged 86) Isle of Man
- Height: 178 cm (5 ft 10 in)
- Weight: 67 kg (148 lb)

Sport
- Sport: Athletics
- Event: steeplechase
- Club: Sparkhill Harriers
Medal record
Men's Athletics
Representing Great Britain
Olympic Games
Silver medal – second place	1964 Tokyo	3000 metre steeplechase
Representing England
British Empire & Commonwealth Games
Silver medal – second place	1962 Perth	3000 metre steeplechase

Maurice Herriott (8 October 1939 – 24 August 2026) was a British track and field athlete who competed mainly in the 3000 metres steeplechase and competed at two Olympic Games.

== Biography ==
Herriott was born in Great Wyrley, South Staffordshire on 8 October 1939.

He became the British 3000 metres steeplechase champion after winning the British AAA Championships title at the 1959 AAA Championships and claimed two more AAA titles at both the 1961 AAA Championships and 1962 AAA Championships.

Herriott also represented England at the 1962 British Empire and Commonwealth Games, taking the silver medal in the steeplechase for England.

He won his fourth and fifth AAA titles in 1963 and 1964, before he was selected to represent Great Britain in the 1964 Olympics held in Tokyo, Japan, in the 3000 metre steeplechase, where he won the silver medal.

Herriott represented the England team at the 1966 British Empire and Commonwealth Games in Kingston, Jamaica, in the 3000 metres steeplechase.

He would go on to win a remarkable eight AAA steeplechase titles with further wins in 1965, 1966 and 1967 and at the 1968 Olympic Games in Mexico City, he represented Great Britain again.

Nationally he ran for the Birmingham-based athletics club Sparkhill Harriers, of which he was made an honorary lifelong member.

Maurice Herriott died following a short illness on the Isle of Man, on 24 August 2026, aged 86.
