= Athletics at the 1962 British Empire and Commonwealth Games =

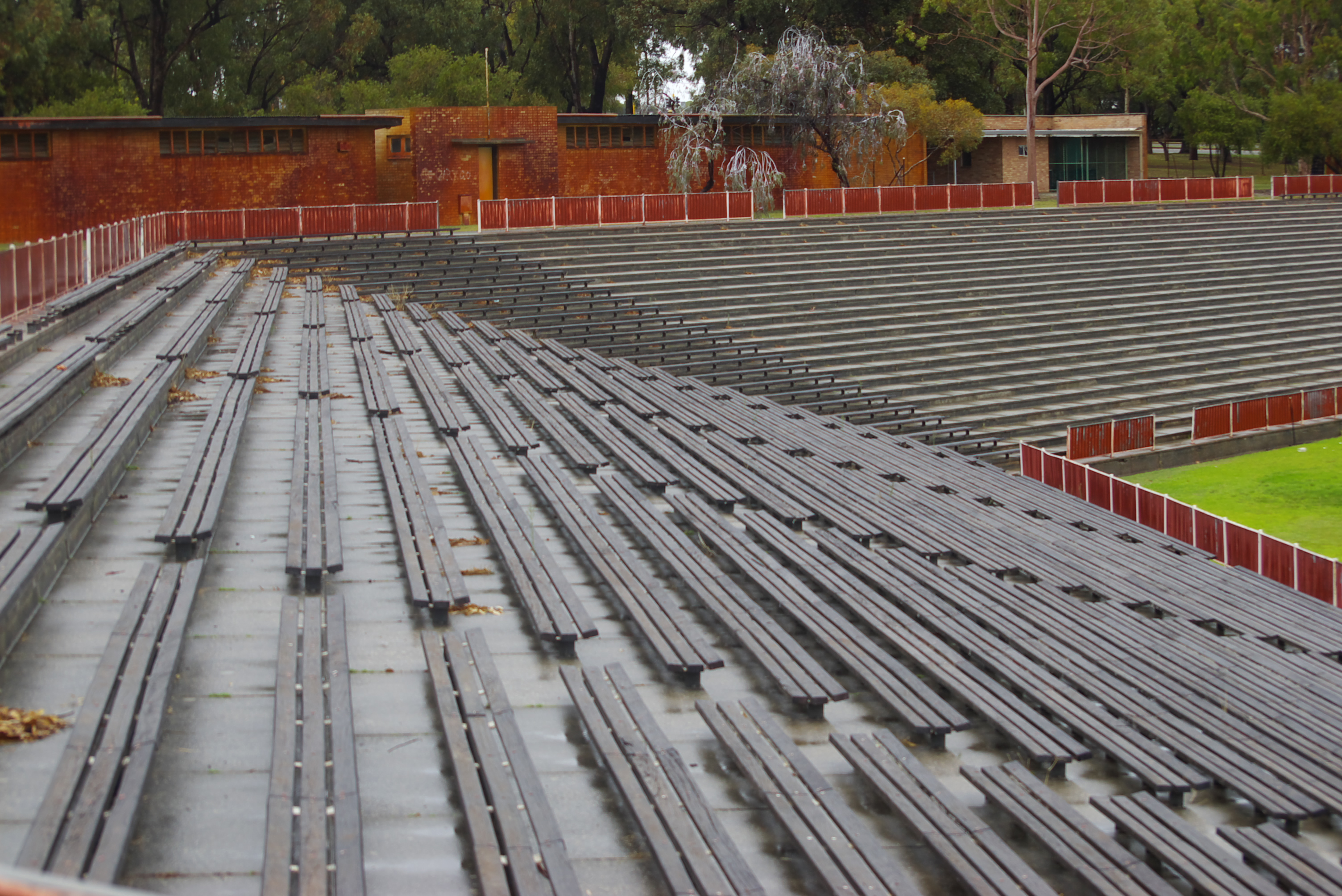
- The host stadium for the athletics events
- Dates: 22 November – 1 December 1962
- Host city: Perth, Australia
- Venue: Perry Lakes Stadium
- Level: Senior

At the 1962 British Empire and Commonwealth Games, the athletics events were held at Perry Lakes Stadium in Perth, Western Australia. The stadium, set in the suburb of Floreat, was purpose-built for the competition. A total of 31 events were contested, of which 21 by male and 10 by female athletes. The competition was affected by hot weather and soldiers from the Australian Army were called upon to supply athletes with water throughout the competition. Heavy wind also affected the programme, with the sprints and jumps most affected by the conditions.

The 1962 Games saw the reintroduction of the men's 3000 metres steeplechase and the women's 880 yards – events which had both been absent for four editions, having previously been held at the 1934 British Empire Games. Kenyan Seraphino Antao won double gold in the sprints, an achievement which marked a breakthrough in the sport for his country. Dorothy Hyman completed the same feat on the women's side. Peter Snell won gold medals in both the 880 yds and the mile run. In the men's 3 miles race, Ronald Clarke found himself outdone by reigning Olympics 5000 metres champion Murray Halberg. Women's thrower Valerie Young built upon her 1958 shot put gold with victories in both the shot put and discus throw.

== Medal summary ==
=== Men ===
Medallists in men's athletics by event, with links to event details, with times, heights and distances
Event	Gold		Silver		Bronze	
100 yards	Seraphino Antao; Kenya	9.50	Tom Robinson; Bahamas	9.63	Michael Cleary; Australia	9.78
220 yards	Seraphino Antao; Kenya	21.28	Dave Jones; England	21.59	Johan Du Preez; Rhodesia and Nyasaland	21.70
440 yards	George Kerr; Jamaica	46.74	Robbie Brightwell; England	46.86	Amos Omolo; Uganda	46.88
880 yards	Peter Snell; New Zealand	1:47.64; GR	George Kerr; Jamaica	1:47.90	Tony Blue; Australia	1:48.99
1 mile	Peter Snell; New Zealand	4:04.58	John Davies; New Zealand	4:05.12	Terry Sullivan; Rhodesia and Nyasaland	4:06.61
3 miles	Murray Halberg; New Zealand	13:34.15	Ronald Clarke; Australia	13:35.92	Bruce Kidd; Canada	13:36.37
6 miles	Bruce Kidd; Canada	28:26.13; GR	Dave Power; Australia	28:33.53	John Merriman; Wales	28:40.26
120 yards hurdles	Ghulam Raziq; Pakistan	14.34	Dave Prince; Australia	14.48	Laurie Taitt; England	14.81
440 yards hurdles	Ken Roche; Australia	51.5	Kimaru Songok; Kenya	51.9	Benson Ishiepai; Uganda	52.3
3000 metres steeplechase	Trevor Vincent; Australia	8:43.4; GR	Maurice Herriott; England	8:45.0	Ron Blackney; Australia	9:00.6
4 × 110 yards relay	England; Alf Meakin; David Jones; Len Carter; Peter Radford	40.62	Ghana; Bonner Mends; Bukari Bashiru; Michael Okantey; Michael Ahey	40.74	Wales; David England; Nick Whitehead; Ron Jones; Berwyn Jones	40.80
4 × 440 yards relay	Jamaica; George Kerr; Laurie Khan; Malcolm Spence; Mel Spence	3:10.2	England; Adrian Metcalfe; Barry Jackson; Robert Setti; Robbie Brightwell	3:11.2	Ghana; Ebenezer Quartey; Frederick Owusu; James Addy; John Asare-Antwi	3:12.3
Marathon	Brian Kilby; England	2:21:17	Dave Power; Australia	2:22:16	Rod Bonella; Australia	2:24:07
High jump	Percy Hobson; Australia	6 ft 11 in (2.11 m); GR	Chilla Porter; Australia	6 ft 10 in (2.08 m)	Anton Norris; Barbados	6 ft 8 in (2.03 m)
Pole vault	Trevor Bickle; Australia	14 ft 9 in (4.50 m)	Danie Burger; Rhodesia and Nyasaland	14 ft 6 in (4.42 m)	Ross Filshie; Australia	14 ft 6 in (4.42 m)
Long jump	Michael Ahey; Ghana	26 ft 5 in (8.05 m)	Dave Norris; New Zealand	25 ft 4 3/4 in (7.74 m)	Wellesley Clayton; Jamaica	25 ft 4 1/4 in (7.73 m)
Triple jump	Ian Tomlinson; Australia	53 ft 2 in (16.21 m)	John Baguley; Australia	52 ft 9 1/4 in (16.08 m)	Fred Alsop; England	52 ft 7 in (16.03 m)
Shot put	Martyn Lucking; England	59 ft 4 in (18.08 m)	Mike Lindsay; Scotland	59 ft 2 1/2 in (18.05 m)	Dave Steen; Canada	58 ft 8 3/4 in (17.90 m)
Discus throw	Warwick Selvey; Australia	185 ft 3 1/2 in (56.48 m)	Mike Lindsay; Scotland	172 ft 6 in (52.58 m)	John Sheldrick; England	166 ft 3 in (50.67 m)
Hammer throw	Howard Payne; England	202 ft 3 in (61.65 m)	Dick Leffler; Australia	196 ft 3 1/2 in (59.83 m)	Robert Brown; Australia	189 ft 1 1/2 in (57.65 m)
Javelin throw	Alf Mitchell; Australia	256 ft 3 in (78.11 m); GR	Colin Smith; England	255 ft 8 1/2 in (77.94 m)	Nick Birks; Australia	246 ft 3 1/2 in (75.07 m)

=== Women ===
Medallists in women's athletics by event with link to details, with times, heights and distances
Event	Gold		Silver		Bronze	
100 yards	Dorothy Hyman; England	11.2	Doreen Porter; New Zealand	11.3	Brenda Cox; Australia	11.4
220 yards	Dorothy Hyman; England	24.00	Joyce Bennett; Australia	24.21	Margaret Burvill; Australia	24.42
880 yards	Dixie Willis; Australia	2:03.85; GR	Marise Chamberlain; New Zealand	2:05.66	Joy Jordan; England	2:05.96
80 metres hurdles	Pam Kilborn; Australia	11.07	Betty Moore; England	11.40	Avis McIntosh; New Zealand	11.47
4 × 110 yards relay	Australia; Brenda Cox; Betty Cuthbert; Glenys Beasley; Joyce Bennett	46.71	England; Ann Packer; Dorothy Hyman; Daphne Arden; Betty Moore	46.81	New Zealand; Avis McIntosh; Doreen Porter; Yvonne Cowan; Nola Bond	46.93
High jump	Robyn Woodhouse; Australia	5 ft 10 in (1.78 m)	Helen Frith; Australia	5 ft 8 in (1.73 m)	Michele Mason; Australia	5 ft 8 in (1.73 m)
Long jump	Pam Kilborn; Australia	20 ft 6 3/4 in (6.27 m)	Helen Frith; Australia	20 ft 5 3/4 in (6.24 m)	Janet Knee; Australia	20 ft 1 1/4 in (6.13 m)
Shot put	Valerie Young; New Zealand	49 ft 11 1/2 in (15.23 m)	Jean Roberts; Australia	47 ft 7 1/2 in (14.52 m)	Suzanne Allday; England	44 ft 6 in (13.56 m)
Discus throw	Valerie Young; New Zealand	164 ft 8 1/2 in (50.20 m)	Rosslyn Williams; Australia	153 ft 1 in (46.66 m)	Mary McDonald; Australia	151 ft 8 in (46.23 m)
Javelin throw	Sue Platt; England	164 ft 10 1/2 in (50.25 m)	Rosemary Morgan; England	162 ft 9 1/2 in (49.62 m)	Anna Pazera; Australia	159 ft 8 1/2 in (48.68 m)

== Medal table ==
* Host nation (Australia)

Medals won by nation; ranked and sortable
Rank	Nation	Gold	Silver	Bronze	Total
1	Australia*	12	12	13	37
2	England	7	8	5	20
3	New Zealand	5	4	2	11
4	Jamaica	2	1	1	4
5	Kenya	2	1	0	3
6	Ghana	1	1	1	3
7	Canada	1	0	2	3
8	Pakistan	1	0	0	1
9	Scotland	0	2	0	2
10	Rhodesia and Nyasaland	0	1	2	3
11	Bahamas	0	1	0	1
12	Uganda	0	0	2	2
12	Wales	0	0	2	2
14	Barbados	0	0	1	1
Totals (14 entries)		31	31	31	93
