= Perry Lakes Stadium =

Was a multi-purpose stadium adjacent to Perry Lakes in Floreat, Western Australia

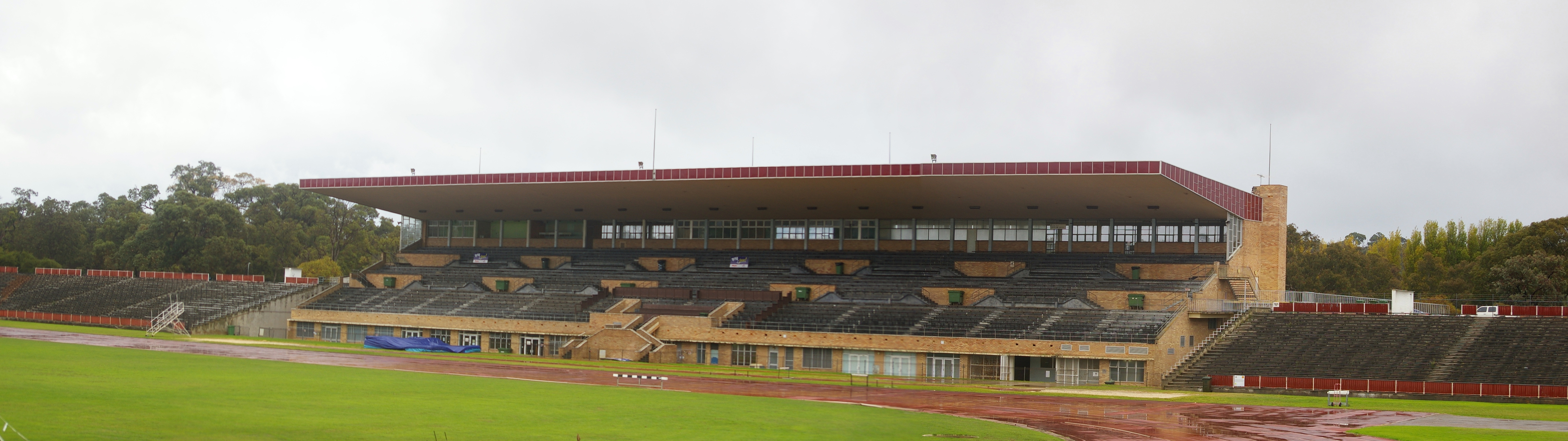
- Interactive map of Perry Lakes Stadium
- Location: Meagher Drive, Floreat, Western Australia
- Coordinates: 31°56′47″S 115°47′24″E
- Owner: Western Australian Government
- Capacity: Athletics: 30,000

Construction
- Opened: 1962
- Closed: 2009
- Demolished: 2010-2012

Perry Lakes Stadium was a multi-purpose stadium adjacent to Perry Lakes in Floreat, Western Australia.

It was built and funded by the State Government and the City of Perth in 1962 for the 1962 British Empire and Commonwealth Games and had a nominal capacity of 30,000. Many other events had been held at Perry Lakes Stadium over the years such as the athletics, soccer and rugby. It has been redeveloped into a residential site and the facility has been replaced by the Western Australian Athletics Stadium, which was constructed on the southern side of Underwood Avenue, which opened nearby in March 2009. The new facilities were funded by the Town of Cambridge and the State Government.

It was the venue of the Public Schools Association and Associated and Catholic Colleges of Western Australia (ACC) athletics carnivals and was also used for the Cancer Council of Western Australia's Relay for Life. The opening and closing ceremonies for the annual Countryweek sports carnival were also held at the stadium with most sporting events being conducted at McGillivray Oval and UWA Sports Park.

Demolition of the stadium began in April 2010, with the grandstand being demolished in September 2012.
