= Athletics at the 1958 British Empire and Commonwealth Games – Men's 440 yards =

Men's 440 yards at the Commonwealth Games

The men's 440 yards event at the 1958 British Empire and Commonwealth Games was held on 17, 22 and 24 July at the Cardiff Arms Park in Cardiff, Wales.

== Medalists ==
Gold	Silver	Bronze
Milkha Singh; India	Malcolm Spence; South Africa	Terry Tobacco; Canada

== Results ==
=== Heats ===
Qualification: First 3 in each heat (Q) qualify directly for the quarterfinals.

Rank	Heat	Name	Nationality	Time	Notes
1	1	John MacIsaac	Scotland	48.3	Q
2	1	Kevan Gosper	Australia	48.3	Q
3	1	Ignatius Okello	Uganda	48.7	Q
4	1	Gerard Leroy	Mauritius	50.5	
5	1	Charles Flower	Gibraltar	53.1	
1	2	Malcolm Spence	South Africa	47.6	Q
2	2	Basil Ince	Trinidad and Tobago	47.9	Q
3	2	Ted Sampson	England	48.4	Q
4	2	Doug Clement	Canada	49.4	
5	2	Robert Hay	Scotland	49.9	
1	3	Malcolm Spence	Jamaica	48.3	Q
2	3	John Salisbury	England	48.7	Q
3	3	Jim Paterson	Scotland	48.9	Q
4	3	Frederick Owusu	Ghana	49.2	
5	3	Rasaki Adenola	Nigeria	52.3	
1	4	George Kerr	Jamaica	48.4	Q
2	4	Derek Johnson	England	49.0	Q
3	4	John Quartey	Ghana	50.0	Q
4	4	Billy Dundas	Northern Ireland	51.0	
5	4	Francis Tommy	Sierra Leone	52.0	
1	5	Milkha Singh	India	48.9	Q
2	5	Samuel Chemweno	Kenya	48.9	Q
3	5	Wilton Jackson	Trinidad and Tobago	49.2	Q
4	5	Melville Spence	Jamaica	50.2	
5	5	I. Benjamin	Sierra Leone	52.1	
1	6	Gerald Evans	South Africa	48.9	Q
2	6	Barry Robinson	New Zealand	48.9	Q
3	6	George Shepherd	Canada	49.6	Q
4	6	Muhammad Yaqub	Pakistan	50.1	
5	6	Richard Ampadu	Ghana	50.2	
6	6	Clyde James	Trinidad and Tobago	54.6	
1	7	John Wrighton	England	49.5	Q
2	7	Kipkorir Boit Kibet	Kenya	49.6	Q
3	7	Ronald Thomson	Scotland	49.7	Q
4	7	Daljit Singh	India	50.2	
5	7	Adebayo Oladapo	Nigeria	50.7	
1	8	Terry Tobacco	Canada	48.2	Q
2	8	Bartonjo Rotich	Kenya	49.1	Q
3	8	Abdul Rahim bin Ahmed	Malaya	49.7	Q
4	8	Gerald James	Jamaica	49.9	
5	8	Tham Siew-kai	Sarawak	53.9	
	8	Clifton Bertrand	Trinidad and Tobago	DNF	

=== Quarterfinals ===
Qualification: First 3 in each heat (Q) qualify directly for the semifinals.

Rank	Heat	Name	Nationality	Time	Notes
1	1	Ted Sampson	England	46.8	Q
2	1	Kevan Gosper	Australia	47.4	Q
3	1	Gerald Evans	South Africa	47.9	Q
4	1	Ronald Thomson	Scotland	48.8	
5	1	Wilton Jackson	Trinidad and Tobago	49.2	
	1	John Quartey	Ghana	DNS	
1	2	Malcolm Spence	South Africa	46.7	Q
2	2	John Salisbury	England	47.3	Q
3	2	Kipkorir Boit Kibet	Kenya	48.0	Q
4	2	Ignatius Okello	Uganda	48.9	
5	2	Abdul Rahim bin Ahmed	Malaya	49.4	
	2	Barry Robinson	New Zealand	DNF	
1	3	Terry Tobacco	Canada	46.8	Q
2	3	John Wrighton	England	47.2	Q
3	3	George Kerr	Jamaica	47.2	Q
4	3	Basil Ince	Trinidad and Tobago	47.9	
5	3	Samuel Chemweno	Kenya	48.3	
6	3	James Paterson	Scotland	48.6	
1	4	Milkha Singh	India	47.0	Q
2	4	John MacIsaac	Scotland	47.3	Q
3	4	Bartonjo Rotich	Kenya	47.5	Q
4	4	Derek Johnson	England	47.7	
5	4	Malcolm Spence	Jamaica	48.4	
	4	George Shepherd	Canada	DNS	

=== Semifinals ===
Qualification: First 3 in each heat (Q) qualify directly for the final.

Rank	Heat	Name	Nationality	Time	Notes
1	1	Malcolm Spence	South Africa	47.3	Q
2	1	John Wrighton	England	47.5	Q
3	1	Terry Tobacco	Canada	47.9	Q
4	1	Ted Sampson	England	48.2	
5	1	George Kerr	Jamaica	48.4	
6	1	Kipkorir Boit Kibet	Kenya	49.8	
1	2	Milkha Singh	India	47.4	Q
2	2	John Salisbury	England	47.4	Q
3	2	John MacIsaac	Scotland	48.1	Q
4	2	Kevan Gosper	Australia	48.1	
5	2	Bartonjo Rotich	Kenya	48.2	
6	2	Gerald Evans	South Africa	48.96	

=== Final ===
Rank	Lane	Name	Nationality	Time	Notes
1st place, gold medalist(s)	6	Milkha Singh	India	46.71	
2nd place, silver medalist(s)	1	Malcolm Spence	South Africa	46.9	
3rd place, bronze medalist(s)	2	Terry Tobacco	Canada	47.05	
4	3	John Salisbury	England	47.1	
5	4	John Wrighton	England	47.2	
6	5	John MacIsaac	Scotland	48.9	
