= Athletics at the 1958 British Empire and Commonwealth Games – Men's 4 × 440 yards relay =

British mens relay in 1958

Men's 4 × 440 yards relay at the Commonwealth Games

The men's 4 × 440 yards relay event at the 1958 British Empire and Commonwealth Games was held on 26 July at the Cardiff Arms Park in Cardiff, Wales.

== Medalists ==
Gold	Silver	Bronze
South Africa; Gordon Day; Gerald Evans; Gert Potgieter; Malcolm Spence	England; Ted Sampson; John Wrighton; John Salisbury; Derek Johnson	Jamaica; Gerald James; Malcolm Spence; George Kerr; Keith Gardner

== Results ==
=== Heats ===
Qualification: First 3 teams of each heat (Q) qualified directly for the final.

Rank	Heat	Nation	Athletes	Time	Notes
1	1	South Africa	Gordon Day, Gerald Evans, Gert Potgieter, Malcolm Spence	3:13.4	Q
2	1	Canada	Doug Clement, Joe Mullins, George Shepherd, Terry Tobacco	3:14.2	Q
3	1	India	Milkha Singh, Daljit Singh, Wahid Usmani, Alex Silvera	3:15.5	Q
4	1	Scotland	James Paterson, John MacIsaac, Donald McDonald, Ronnie Thomson	3:17.4	
5	1	Ghana	Richard Ampadu, John Quartey, Frederick Owusu, J. Boama	3:21.4	
1	2	Jamaica	Gerald James, Malcolm Spence, George Kerr, Keith Gardner	3:13.7	Q
2	2	England	Ted Sampson, John Wrighton, John Salisbury, Derek Johnson	3:16.0	Q
3	2	Kenya	Samuel Chemweno, Bartonjo Rotich, Aram Keter, Kipkorir Boit Kibet	3:16.7	Q
4	2	Trinidad and Tobago	Basil Ince, Clyde James, Wilton Jackson, Clifton Bertrand	3:19.8	
	2	Australia		DNS	

=== Final ===
Rank	Nation	Athletes	Time	Notes
1st place, gold medalist(s)	South Africa	Gordon Day, Gerald Evans, Gert Potgieter, Malcolm Spence	3:08.21	GR
2nd place, silver medalist(s)	England	Ted Sampson, John Wrighton, John Salisbury, Derek Johnson	3:09.61	
3rd place, bronze medalist(s)	Jamaica	Gerald James, Malcolm Spence, George Kerr, Keith Gardner	3:10.08	
4	Canada	Doug Clement, Joe Mullins, George Shepherd, Terry Tobacco	3:12.8	
5	India	Milkha Singh, Daljit Singh, Wahid Usmani, Alex Silvera	3:15.3	
6	Kenya	Samuel Chemweno, Bartonjo Rotich, Aram Keter, Kipkorir Boit Kibet	3:16.7	
