= Athletics at the 1962 British Empire and Commonwealth Games – Men's 4 × 440 yards relay =

Men's 4 × 440 yards relay at the 1962 British Empire and Commonwealth Games
- Venue: Perry Lakes Stadium
- Date: 1 December 1962
- Teams: 8
- Winning time: 3:10.2

Medalists
| gold medal | Malcolm Spence; Laurie Khan; Mel Spence; George Kerr | Jamaica |
| silver medal | Adrian Metcalfe; Robert Setti; Barry Jackson; Robbie Brightwell | England |
| bronze medal | Ebenezer Quartey; James Addy; Frederick Owusu; John Asare-Antwi | Ghana |

The men's 4 × 440 yards relay at the 1962 British Empire and Commonwealth Games as part of the athletics programme was held at the Perry Lakes Stadium on Saturday 1 December 1962.

Eights nations competed in two heats in the first round, with the top three from each heat qualifying for the final.

The event was won Jamaican team of Malcolm Spence, Laurie Khan, Mel Spence and George Kerr in a time of 3:10.2. They finished a full second ahead of English team of Adrian Metcalfe, Robert Setti, Barry Jackson and Robbie Brightwell and the Ghanaian quartet of Ebenezer Quartey, James Addy, Frederick Owusu and John Asare-Antwi who won bronze.

== Records ==
| World record | United States (USA) (Eddie Southern, Earl Young, Otis Davis, Jack Yerman) | 3:05.6 | Walnut, California, United States | 12 August 1960 |
| Commonwealth record | | | | |
| Games record | South Africa (Gerald Evans, Gert Potgieter, Gordon Day, Malcolm Spence) | 3:08.1 | Cardiff, Wales | 27 July 1958 |

== Round 1 ==
=== Heat 1 ===
| Rank | Nation | Competitors | Time | Notes |
|---|---|---|---|---|
| 1 | Jamaica | George Kerr, Laurie Khan, Malcolm Spence, Mel Spence | 3:12.1 | Q |
| 2 | Australia | Brian Waters, Peter Quiggan, John Randall, Ken Roche | 3:15.4 | Q |
| 3 | Kenya | Kimaru Songok, Peter Francis, Seraphino Antao, Wilson Kiprugut | 3:18.9 | Q |
| 4 | Malaya | Karu Selvaratnam, Mazlan Hamzah, Mohamed Abdul Rahiman, Victor Asirvatham | 3:22.5 | |

=== Heat 2 ===
| Rank | Nation | Competitors | Time | Notes |
|---|---|---|---|---|
| 1 | England | Adrian Metcalfe, Barry Jackson, Robert Setti, Robbie Brightwell | 3:13.1 | Q |
| 2 | Ghana | Ebenezer Quartey, Frederick Owusu, James Addy, John Asare-Antwi | 3:14.0 | Q |
| 3 | Canada | George Shepherd, Don Bertoia, Lynn Eves, Bill Crothers | 3:15.2 | Q |
| 4 | New Zealand | Barry Robinson, Dave Norris, Gary Philpott, Peter Snell | 3:17.3 | |

== Final ==
| Rank | Nation | Competitors | Time | Notes |
|---|---|---|---|---|
| 1st place, gold medalist(s) | Jamaica | Malcolm Spence, Laurie Khan, Mel Spence, George Kerr | 3:10.2 | |
| 2nd place, silver medalist(s) | England | Adrian Metcalfe, Robert Setti, Barry Jackson, Robbie Brightwell | 3:11.2 | |
| 3rd place, bronze medalist(s) | Ghana | Ebenezer Quartey, James Addy, Frederick Owusu, John Asare-Antwi | 3:12.3 | |
| 4 | Australia | Brian Waters, Peter Quiggan, John Randall, Ken Roche | 3:12.9 | |
| 5 | Kenya | Kimaru Songok, Peter Francis, Seraphino Antao, Wilson Kiprugut | 3:16.0 | |
| 6 | Canada | George Shepherd, Don Bertoia, Lynn Eves, Bill Crothers | 3:20.6 | |
