= Athletics at the 1955 Summer International University Sports Week – Men's 400 metres =

The men's 400 metres event at the 1955 International University Sports Week was held in San Sebastián on 12, 13 and 14 August 1955.

== Medalists ==
Gold	Silver	Bronze
Grant Scruggs; United States	Jean-Jacques Hegg; Switzerland	John Wrighton; Great Britain

== Results ==
=== Heats ===
Rank	Heat	Athlete	Nationality	Time	Notes
1	1	Grant Scruggs	United States	50.5	Q
2	1	Roger Baker	Great Britain	50.6	Q
3	1	Mario Paoletti	Italy	51.0	Q
4	1	Heinrich Moser	West Germany	51.3	
5	1	Jacques Bierlaire	Belgium	51.4	
6	1	Puertas	Spain	54.8	
1	2	Juan Cruz Echeandía	Spain	51.1	Q
2	2	John Wrighton	Great Britain	51.3	Q
3	2	Rolf Ude	West Germany	52.2	Q
4	2	Walter Kratz	Saar	53.3	
1	3	Kanji Akagi	Japan	50.3	Q
2	3	Enrico Archilli	Italy	50.7	Q
3	3	Urban Cleve	West Germany	51.0	Q
4	3	Fernando Bremón	Spain	51.5	
5	3	Roger Bofferding	Luxembourg	51.6	
1	4	Jean-Jacques Hegg	Switzerland	49.6	Q
2	4	João Coutinho	Portugal	50.5	Q
3	4	Shigeharu Suzuki	Japan	50.7	Q
4	4	Jim Paterson	Great Britain	50.9	
5	4	Arie Gluck	Israel	55.4	

=== Semifinals ===
Rank	Heat	Athlete	Nationality	Time	Notes
1	1	Grant Scruggs	United States	49.5	Q
2	1	João Coutinho	Portugal	49.8	Q
3	1	Enrico Archilli	Italy	49.9	Q
4	1	Roger Baker	Great Britain	50.7	
5	1	Urban Cleve	West Germany	51.1	
6	1	Shigeharu Suzuki	Japan	53.2	
1	2	Kanji Akagi	Japan	49.9	Q
2	2	Jean-Jacques Hegg	Switzerland	50.0	Q
3	2	John Wrighton	Great Britain	50.3	Q
4	2	Mario Paoletti	Italy	50.8	
5	2	Rolf Ude	West Germany	50.9	
6	2	Juan Cruz Echeandía	Spain	54.2	

=== Final ===
Rank	Name	Nationality	Time	Notes
1st place, gold medalist(s)	Grant Scruggs	United States	48.0	
2nd place, silver medalist(s)	Jean-Jacques Hegg	Switzerland	48.2	
3rd place, bronze medalist(s)	John Wrighton	Great Britain	48.9	
4	Kanji Akagi	Japan	49.6	
5	João Coutinho	Portugal	49.9	
6	Enrico Archilli	Italy	49.9	
