= Athletics at the 1955 Summer International University Sports Week – Men's medley relay =

The men's 800+400+200+100 sprint medley relay event at the 1955 International University Sports Week was held in San Sebastián on 13 August 1955.

== Results ==
Rank	Nation	Athletes	Time	Notes
1st place, gold medalist(s)	West Germany	Olaf Lawrenz, Lothar Prinz, Karl-Heinz Naujoks, Heinrich Moser	3:14.3	
2nd place, silver medalist(s)	Great Britain	Donald Gorrie, John Wrighton, Graham Robertson, Stanley Orman	3:16.0	
3rd place, bronze medalist(s)	Spain	José María Giménez, José Alonso Peralta, Fernando Bremón, Manuel García Cabrera	3:20.3	
4	Japan	Shigeharu Suzuki, Kanji Akagi, Yoshiaki Hara, Yushiro Sonoda	3:22.9	
5	Italy	Angelo Tagliapietra, Giovanni Bonanno, Sergio D'Asnasch, Franco Panizza	3:22.9	
6	Belgium	Byl, Jacques Bierlaire, Maisin, Jacques Vanden Abeele	3:26.4	
7	Luxembourg	Roger Bofferding, Niedner, Reckinger, Schitte	?:??.?	
