= Ghana at the 1962 British Empire and Commonwealth Games =

- CG code: GHA
- CGA: Ghana Olympic Committee

in Perth, Western Australia
- Flag bearers: Opening: Closing:
- Medals Ranked 7th: Gold 3 Silver 5 Bronze 1 Total 9

British Empire and Commonwealth Games appearances
- 1954; 1958; 1962; 1966; 1970; 1974; 1978; 1982; 1986; 1990; 1994; 1998; 2002; 2006; 2010; 2014; 2018; 2022; 2026; 2030

Ghana competed at the 1962 British Empire and Commonwealth Games in Perth, Western Australia, from 22 November to 1 December 1962. Ghana won 7 gold, 5 silver, and 1 bronze medal, and ranked 7th overall.

Ghana was the leading country in the boxing events, winning 2 gold and 4 silver medals. The Ghanaians were the best all-round boxing team which was attributed to training received from Sgt. J. Roy and the former professional champion Roy Ankrah.

== Medalists ==
Medal	Name	Sport	Event	Date
Gold	Michael Ahey	Athletics	Men's long jump	26 November
Gold	Eddie Blay	Boxing	Lightweight	
Gold	Clement Quartey	Boxing	Light Welterweight	
Silver	Michael Ahey; Bukari Bashiru; Bonner Mends; Michael Okantey	Athletics	Men's 4 × 110 yards relay	1 December
Silver	Isaac Aryee	Boxing	Flyweight	
Silver	Sammy Abbey	Boxing	Bantamweight	
Silver	Thomas Arimi	Boxing	Middleweight	
Silver	Jojo Miles	Boxing	Light Heavyweight	
Bronze	James Addy; John Asare-Antwi; Frederick Owusu; Ebenezer Quartey	Athletics	Men's 4 × 440 yards relay	1 December

== Athletics ==
Men
Track events

Athlete	Event	Round 1		Round 2		Semifinal		Final	
Athlete	Event	Result	Rank	Result	Rank	Result	Rank	Result	Rank
Michael Ahey	100 yd	9.7	1 Q	9.9	2 Q	9.8	4	did not advance	
Bukari Bashiru	100 yd	9.8	2 Q	9.9	3	did not advance			
Bonner Mends	100 yd	9.7	2 Q	9.9	3	did not advance			
Michael Okantey	100 yd	9.7	2 Q	9.8	2 Q	9.7	4	did not advance	
John Geraldo	220 yd	22.3	5	did not advance					
Michael Okantey	220 yd	21.5	1 Q	21.7	1 Q	21.5	2 Q	21.9	4
James Addy	440 yd	47.8	2 Q	—N/a		48.6	5	did not advance	
Brobbey Mensah	440 yd	48.4	3	—N/a		did not advance			
Ebenezer Quartey	440 yd	48.4	3	—N/a		did not advance			
Frederick Owusu	880 yd	DNS		—N/a		did not advance			
Michael Ahey; Bukari Bashiru; Bonner Mends; Michael Okantey	4×110 yd relay	41.3	2 Q	—N/a				40.6	(silver) GR
James Addy; John Asare-Antwi; Frederick Owusu; Ebenezer Quartey	4×440 yd relay	3:14.0	2 Q	—N/a				3:12.3	3rd place, bronze medalist(s)

Field events

Athlete	Event	Final	
Athlete	Event	Distance	Rank
Ohere Asa Akuffo	Pole vault	NM	
Michael Ahey	Long jump	26 ft 5 in (8.05 m)	(gold) GR

Women
Track events

Athlete	Event	Round 1		Semifinal		Final	
Athlete	Event	Result	Rank	Result	Rank	Result	Rank
Christiana Boateng	100 yd	11.2	3 Q	10.9	2 Q	11.6	4
Rose Hart	100 yd	11.4	4	did not advance			
Grace Hogan	100 yd	12.5	6	did not advance			
Christiana Boateng	220 yd	25.5	4	did not advance			
Rose Hart	220 yd	25.6	4	did not advance			
Victoria Chinery	80 m hurdles	12.4	6	—N/a		did not advance	
Rose Hart	80 m hurdles	11.4	4	—N/a		did not advance	
Matilda Adjei; Christiana Boateng; Victoria Chinery; Rose Hart	4×110 yd relay	—N/a				49.0	5

Field events

Athlete	Event	Final	
Athlete	Event	Distance	Rank
Christiana Boateng	Long jump	17 ft 1 1/4 in (5.21 m)	9

== See also ==
- Ghana at the 1960 Summer Olympics
- Ghana at the 1964 Summer Olympics
