= Athletics at the 1954 British Empire and Commonwealth Games – Men's 440 yards =

Men's 440 yards at the Commonwealth Games
- Venue: Empire Stadium
- Dates: 6 and 7 August

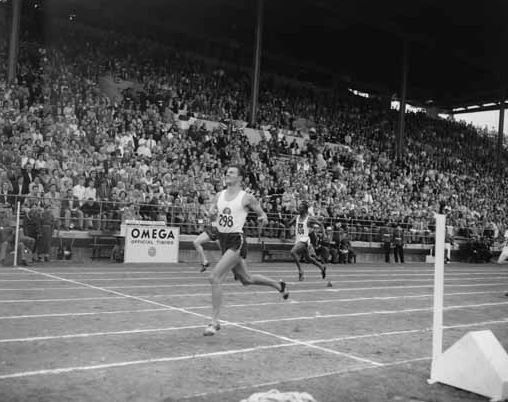
Kevan Gosper wins the first semi final Attribution:Province newspaper

The men's 440 yards event at the 1954 British Empire and Commonwealth Games was held on 6 and 7 August at the Empire Stadium in Vancouver, Canada.

== Medalists ==
Gold	Silver	Bronze
Kevan Gosper; Australia	Don Jowett; New Zealand	Terry Tobacco; Canada

== Results ==
=== Heats ===
Held on 6 August

Qualification: First 2 in each heat (Q) qualify directly for the semifinals.

Rank	Heat	Name	Nationality	Time	Notes
1	1	Kevan Gosper	Australia	47.1	Q, GR
2	1	Laird Sloane	Canada	48.5	Q
3	1	Harry Kane	England	48.7	
4	1	Musembi Mbathi	Kenya	49.4	
5	1	Peter Phillips	Wales	50.0	
6	1	John Quartey	Gold Coast	50.0	
1	2	Don Jowett	New Zealand	48.4	Q
2	2	James Rogers	British Guiana	48.6	Q
3	2	Dick Harding	Canada	49.2	
4	2	Edward Nyako	Gold Coast	51.4	
5	2	Josefa Sadulu	Fiji	52.5	
	2	Allan Moore	Jamaica	DNF	
1	3	Terry Tobacco	Canada	48.3	Q
2	3	Kipkorir Boit Kibet	Kenya	49.0	Q
3	3	Keith Davis	Bermuda	49.9	
4	3	Cyril Johnson	Bahamas	51.8	
	3	Keith Gardner	Jamaica	DNS	
	3	Mike Agostini	Trinidad and Tobago	DNS	
1	4	Louis Gooden	Jamaica	54.5	Q
2	4	Alan Dick	England	55.4	Q
	4	Joginder Dhanaor	India	DNF	
	4	Leonard Dames	Bahamas	DNS	
1	5	Peter Fryer	England	48.6	Q
2	5	Fitzroy Bates	Trinidad and Tobago	49.1	Q
3	5	David Fleming	New Zealand	49.8	
4	5	Richard Ampadu	Gold Coast	50.2	
5	5	Irrington Isaacs	Bahamas	54.3	
1	6	Peter Higgins	England	49.1	Q
2	6	Henry Ofori-Nayako	Gold Coast	49.5	Q
3	6	Joseph Foreman	Canada	49.9	
4	6	Richard Estick	Jamaica	50.1	
	4	Abdul Karim Amu	Nigeria	DNS	

=== Semifinals ===
Held on 6 August

Qualification: First 3 in each heat (Q) qualify directly for the final.

Rank	Heat	Name	Nationality	Time	Notes
1	1	Kevan Gosper	Australia	47.8	Q
2	1	Terry Tobacco	Canada	48.4	Q
3	1	James Rogers	British Guiana	48.4	Q
4	1	Henry Ofori-Nayako	Gold Coast	48.9	
5	1	Fitzroy Bates	Trinidad and Tobago	49.2	
6	1	Peter Higgins	England	50.3	
1	2	Alan Dick	England	48.8	Q
2	2	Don Jowett	New Zealand	48.9	Q
3	2	Peter Fryer	England	48.9	Q
4	2	Laird Sloane	Canada	49.2	
5	2	Kipkorir Boit Kibet	Kenya	49.6	
6	2	Louis Gooden	Jamaica	49.7	

=== Final ===
Held on 7 August

Rank	Name	Nationality	Time	Notes
1st place, gold medalist(s)	Kevan Gosper	Australia	47.2	GR
2nd place, silver medalist(s)	Don Jowett	New Zealand	47.4	
3rd place, bronze medalist(s)	Terry Tobacco	Canada	47.8	
4	Peter Fryer	England	48.4	
5	James Rogers	British Guiana	48.5	
6	Alan Dick	England	48.6	
