= Athletics at the 1955 Summer International University Sports Week – Men's 4 × 400 metres relay =

The men's 4 × 400 metres relay event at the 1955 International University Sports Week was held in San Sebastián on 14 August 1955.

== Results ==
| Rank | Nation | Athletes | Time | Notes |
|---|---|---|---|---|
| 1st place, gold medalist(s) | Great Britain | John Wrighton, Jim Paterson, Roger Baker, Jock Beesley | 3:20.0 | |
| 2nd place, silver medalist(s) | West Germany | Rolf Ude, Urban Cleve, Wolfgang Ring, Heinrich Moser | 3:20.5 | |
| 3rd place, bronze medalist(s) | Italy | Enrico Archilli, Giovanni Bonanno, Mario Paoletti, Gianfranco Fantuzzi | 3:20.5 | |
| 4 | Spain | Manuel García Cabrera, José María Giménez, Manuel Francisco González Campanal, Fernando Bremón | 3:29.0 | |
| 5 | Belgium | Maisin, Byl, Jacques Vanden Abeele, Jacques Bierlaire | 3:29.5 | |
