= Athletics at the 1953 Summer International University Sports Week =

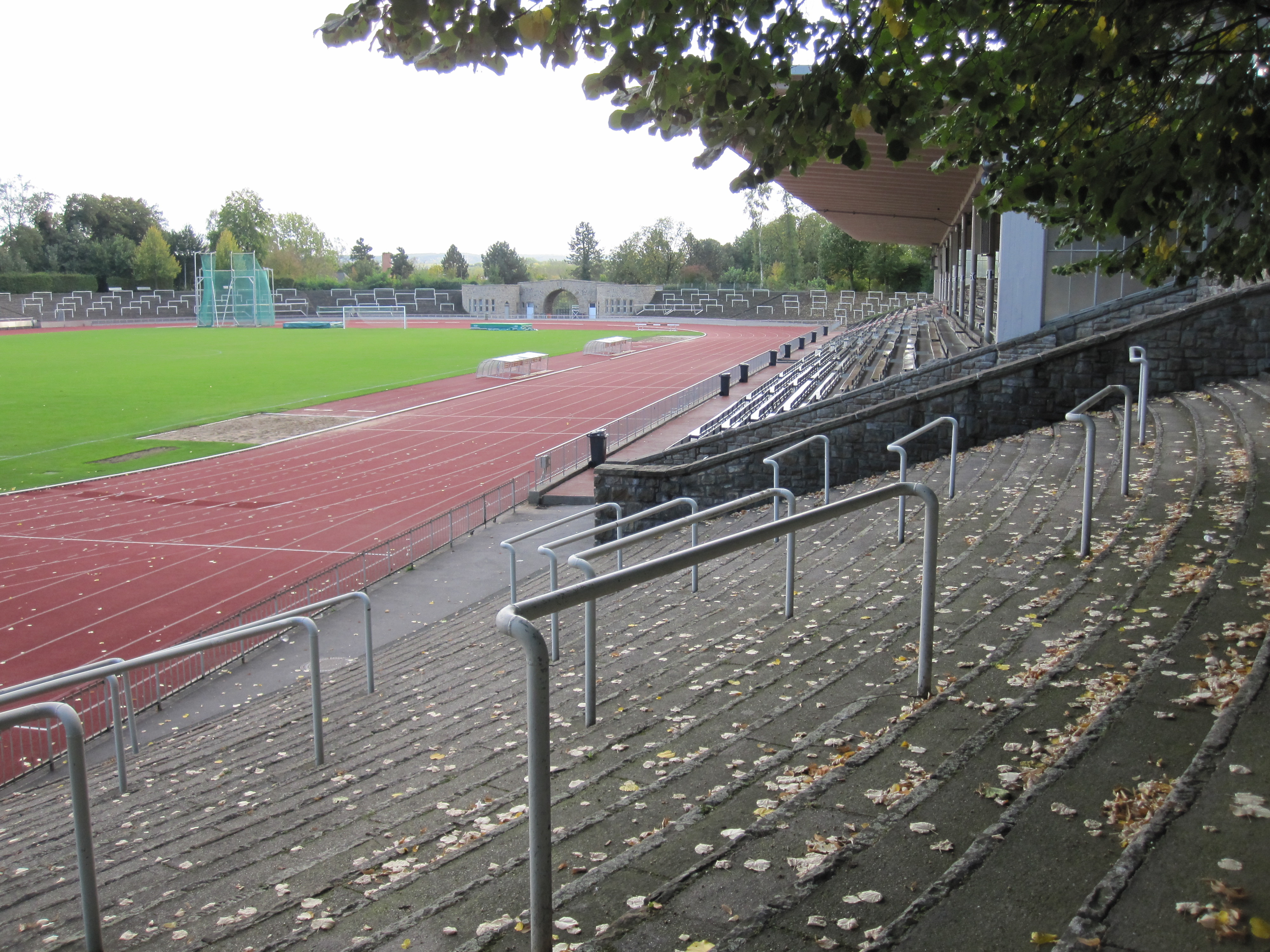
- Dates: 13–16 August
- Host city: Dortmund, West Germany
- Venue: Stadion Rote Erde
- Events: 29

The athletics competition at the 1953 Summer International University Sports Week was held at the Stadion Rote Erde in Dortmund, West Germany, between 13 and 16 August.

== Medal summary ==
=== Men ===
Event	Gold		Silver		Bronze	
100 metres	Romeo Galán (ARG)	10.7w?	Milovan Jovančić (YUG)	10.7w?	Jacques Vercruysse (BEL)	10.7w?
200 metres	Jacques Vercruysse (BEL)	21.9	Milovan Jovančić (YUG)	22.0	Austin Pinnington (GBR)	22.0
400 metres	Karl-Friedrich Haas (FRG)	47.6	Keith Whittaker (GBR)	49.6	Peter Phillips (GBR)	49.7
800 metres	Urban Cleve (FRG)	1:51.9	Brian Grogan (GBR)	1:52.2	Gérard Rasquin (LUX)	1:52.5
1500 metres	David Law (GBR)	3:50.4	Ralph Dunkley (GBR)	3:50.6	Veliša Mugoša (YUG)	3:51.6
5000 metres	Osamu Inoue (JPN)	14:48.6	Tony Weeks-Pearson (GBR)	14:49.0	Velimir Veka Ilić (YUG)	14:55.2
110 metres hurdles	Berthold Steines (FRG)	14.7	Estanislao Kocourek (ARG)	14.7	Paul Vine (GBR)	14.9
400 metres hurdles	David Gracie (GBR)	52.7	Eitaro Okano (JPN)	53.1	Georg Sallen (FRG)	53.9
4 × 100 metres relay	(Argentina) Argentina; Estanislao Kocourek; Fernando Lapuente; Romeo Galán; Jorge Ghirimoldi	42.2	(Italy) Italy; Mario Colarossi; Wolfgango Montanari; Lucio Sangermano; Carlo Vittori	42.2	(United Kingdom) Great Britain & N.I. Paul Vine; Chris Higham; John Groves; Austin Pinnington	42.2
4 × 400 metres relay	(West Germany) F.R. Germany; Urban Cleve; Karl-Friedrich Haas; Georg Wilhelm Sallen; Rolf Ude	3:16.0	(United Kingdom) Great Britain & N.I. Keith Whittaker; Peter Phillips; Harold Steggles; David Gracie	3:16.0	Belgium	3:19.3
1600 metres medley relay	(West Germany) F.R. Germany; Urban Cleve; Karl-Friedrich Haas; Günther Theilmann; Heinz Wegener	3:12.8	(United Kingdom) Great Britain & N.I. Brian Grogan; Peter Phillips; John Groves; Austin Pinnington	3:12.8	(Japan) Japan; Masaji Tajima; Michio Ueki; Toru Kiyofuji; Tomoji Ozawa	3:16.2
High jump	Jacques Delelienne (BEL)	1.90	Yukio Ishikawa (JPN)	1.90	Takehiko Nakajima (JPN)	1.85
Pole vault	Milan Milakov (YUG)	4.31	Geoff Elliott (GBR)	4.20	Hélcio da Silva (BRA)	4.00
Long jump	Masaji Tajima (JPN)	7.66	Heinz Oberbeck (FRG)	7.43	Gian Piero Druetto (ITA)	7.32
Triple jump	Adhemar da Silva (BRA)	15.92	Akira Nishimura (JPN)	14.95	Heinz Oberbeck (FRG)	14.65
Shot put	Heinz Lutter (FRG)	14.59	Mark Pharaoh (GBR)	14.34	Heinz Oberbeck (FRG)	???
Discus throw	Mark Pharaoh (GBR)	47.84	Darko Krnjajić (YUG)	46.25	Miguel de la Quadra-Salcedo (ESP)	44.87
Hammer throw	Yoshio Kojima (JPN)	50.33	Mark Pharaoh (GBR)	46.46	Willy Druyts (BEL)	45.22
Javelin throw	Gerhard Keller (FRG)	61.88	Hermann Rieder (FRG)	60.13	Hidemine Nakagawa (JPN)	59.71
Pentathlon	Gerhard Keller (FRG)	2923.00	Francisco Moura (BRA)	2774.00	Leonhard Zanier (AUT)	2621.00

=== Women ===
Event	Gold		Silver		Bronze	
100 metres	Milena Greppi (ITA)	12.3	Margaret Francis (GBR)	12.3	Friederike Harasek (AUT)	12.4
200 metres	Margaret Francis (GBR)	25.9	Friederike Harasek (AUT)	25.9	Constance Cartwright (GBR)	26.1
80 metres hurdles	Milka Babović (YUG)	11.7	Hilke Thymm (FRG)	11.8	Milena Greppi (ITA)	11.9
4 × 100 metres relay	(Italy) Italy; Vittoria Cesarini; Milena Greppi; Pier Paola De Bernardini; Angiolina Constantino	48.9	(West Germany) F.R. Germany; Ursula Ehrhardt; Else Jores; Hilke Thymm; Ursula Schitteck	48.9	(United Kingdom) Great Britain & N.I. Margaret Francis; Janet Findlater; Margaret Mellor; Constance Cartwright	49.2
High jump	Lesley Line (GBR)	1.60	Jean Macleod (GBR)	1.56	Ursula Ehrhardt (FRG)	1.56
Long jump	Else Jores (FRG)	5.55	Friederike Harasek (AUT)	5.36	Ursula Schitteck (FRG)	5.30
Shot put	Lore Klute (FRG)	12.32	Lotte Klos (FRG)	10.96	Doris Bethe (FRG)	10.72
Discus throw	Lore Klute (FRG)	39.65	Almut Brömmel (FRG)	34.97	Babette Schweizer (SUI)	34.14
Javelin throw	Almut Brömmel (FRG)	42.62	Cmiljka Kalušević (YUG)	42.46	Siegrid Lewandowski (FRG)	35.09

== Medal table ==
Rank	Nation	Gold	Silver	Bronze	Total
1	West Germany (FRG)	12	6	7	25
2	Great Britain (GBR)	5	11	6	22
3	Japan (JPN)	3	3	3	9
4	Yugoslavia (YUG)	2	4	2	8
5	Italy (ITA)	2	1	2	5
6	Argentina (ARG)	2	1	0	3
7	Belgium (BEL)	2	0	3	5
8	Brazil (BRA)	1	1	1	3
9	Austria (AUT)	0	2	2	4
10	Luxembourg (LUX)	0	0	1	1
10	Spain (ESP)	0	0	1	1
10	Switzerland (SUI)	0	0	1	1
Totals (12 entries)		29	29	29	87

== See also ==
- FISU World University Games § Precursors
- University and college sport
