= Athletics at the 1955 Summer International University Sports Week – Men's 800 metres =

The men's 800 metres event at the 1955 International University Sports Week was held in San Sebastián on 11 and 12 August 1955.

== Medalists ==
Gold	Silver	Bronze
Olaf Lawrenz; West Germany	Wolfgang Ring; West Germany	José María Giménez; Spain

== Results ==
=== Heats ===
Rank	Heat	Athlete	Nationality	Time	Notes
1	1	Olaf Lawrenz	West Germany	1:55.8	Q
2	1	Manuel García Cabrera	Spain	1:57.0	Q
3	1	Shigeharu Suzuki	Japan	1:57.7	Q
4	1	Ian Boyd	Great Britain	1:57.9	Q
5	1	Sim Sang-ok	South Korea	1:59.2	Q
6	1	Angelo Tagliapietra	Italy	1:59.5	Q
7	1	Niedner	Luxembourg	?:??.?	
8	1	Byl	Belgium	?:??.?	
9	1	Walter Kratz	Saar	?:??.?	
1	2	Heinrich Moser	West Germany	1:56.4	Q
2	2	Wolfgang Ring	West Germany	1:56.5	Q
3	2	José María Giménez	Spain	1:56.8	Q
4	2	Donald Gorrie	Great Britain	1:57.0	Q
5	2	Jock Beesley	Great Britain	1:57.2	Q
6	2	Giuliano Gelmi	Italy	1:58.4	Q
7	2	João Coutinho	Portugal	?:??.?	
8	2	Jacques Bierlaire	Belgium	?:??.?	

=== Final ===
Rank	Name	Nationality	Time	Notes
1st place, gold medalist(s)	Olaf Lawrenz	West Germany	1:51.5	GR
2nd place, silver medalist(s)	Wolfgang Ring	West Germany	1:54.9	
3rd place, bronze medalist(s)	José María Giménez	Spain	1:55.3	
4	Manuel García Cabrera	Spain	1:55.4	
5	Shigeharu Suzuki	Japan	1:55.4	
6	Ian Boyd	Great Britain	1:55.9	
7	Giuliano Gelmi	Italy	?:??.?	
8	Jock Beesley	Great Britain	?:??.?	
9	Heinrich Moser	West Germany	?:??.?	
10	Angelo Tagliapietra	Italy	?:??.?	
11	Sim Sang-ok	South Korea	?:??.?	
12	Donald Gorrie	Great Britain	?:??.?	
