= Athletics at the 1959 Pan American Games – Men's 400 metres =

Men's 400 metres at the Pan American Games

The men's 400 metres event at the 1959 Pan American Games was held at the Soldier Field in Chicago on 31 August and 1 September.

== Medalists ==
Gold	Silver	Bronze
George Kerr; British West Indies	Basil Ince; British West Indies	Malcolm Spence; British West Indies

== Results ==
=== Heats ===
Held on 31 August

Rank	Heat	Name	Nationality	Time	Notes
1	1	Eddie Southern	United States	48.4	Q
2	1	Emigdio Torres	Cuba	48.5	Q
3	1	Ovidio de Jesús	Puerto Rico	49.1	Q
4	1	Siegmar Ohlemann	Canada	49.7	
5	1	Hugo Krauss	Chile	50.3	
6	1	Heber Etcheverry	Uruguay	51.4	
7	1	Rafael Arcos	Ecuador	??.?	
1	2	Dave Mills	United States	48.0	Q
2	2	Malcolm Spence	British West Indies	48.0	Q
3	2	Anubes da Silva	Brazil	48.7	Q
4	2	Gonzalo Gonzáles	Mexico	50.6	
5	2	Guillermo Rocca	Venezuela	50.9	
6	2	George Shepherd	Canada	53.0	
	2	Anthony Seth	British Guiana	DNS	
1	3	George Kerr	British West Indies	47.9	Q
2	3	Jack Yerman	United States	48.1	Q
3	3	José Luis Villalongo	Puerto Rico	49.3	Q
4	3	Eulogio García	Peru	49.5	
5	3	Juan Cruz	Mexico	49.9	
6	3	Stan Worsfold	Canada	50.3	
7	3	Argemiro Roque	Brazil	??.?	
1	4	Iván Rodríguez	Puerto Rico	47.7	Q
2	4	Basil Ince	British West Indies	48.4	Q
3	4	Emilio Romero	Venezuela	49.3	Q
4	4	Jorge Terán	Mexico	50.8	
5	4	José Carrera	Ecuador	51.2	
6	4	Peter Ostermeyer	Brazil	??.?	

=== Semifinals ===
Held on 31 August

Rank	Heat	Name	Nationality	Time	Notes
1	1	George Kerr	British West Indies	47.5	Q
2	1	Dave Mills	United States	47.9	Q
3	1	Jack Yerman	United States	48.1	Q
4	1	Emigdio Torres	Cuba	48.5	
5	1	Ovidio de Jesús	Puerto Rico	52.5	
	1	José Luis Villalongo	Puerto Rico	DNS	
1	2	Malcolm Spence	British West Indies	47.2	Q
2	2	Iván Rodríguez	Puerto Rico	47.4	Q
3	2	Basil Ince	British West Indies	47.5	Q
4	2	Eddie Southern	United States	47.6	
5	2	Anubes da Silva	Brazil	48.4	
6	2	Emilio Romero	Venezuela	49.4	

=== Final ===
Held on 1 September

Rank	Name	Nationality	Time	Notes
1st place, gold medalist(s)	George Kerr	British West Indies	46.1	
2nd place, silver medalist(s)	Basil Ince	British West Indies	46.4	
3rd place, bronze medalist(s)	Malcolm Spence	British West Indies	46.6	
4	Dave Mills	United States	46.7	
5	Iván Rodríguez	Puerto Rico	47.0	
6	Jack Yerman	United States	47.9	
