= Athletics at the 1955 Summer International University Sports Week – Men's 100 metres =

The men's 100 metres event at the 1955 International University Sports Week was held in San Sebastián on 12, 13 and 14 August 1955.

== Medalists ==
Gold	Silver	Bronze
Jacques Vercruysse; Belgium	Lothar Prinz; West Germany	Stanley Orman; Great Britain

== Results ==
=== Heats ===
Rank	Heat	Athlete	Nationality	Time	Notes
1	1	Lothar Prinz	West Germany	11.3	Q
2	1	Kanji Akagi	Japan	11.5	Q
1	2	Mario Colarrosi	Italy	11.2	Q
2	2	Yoshiaki Hara	Japan	11.4	Q
3	2	Pierfancesco Campana	Switzerland	11.4	
4	2	Rui Trincheiras	Portugal	11.4	
1	3	Karl-Heinz Naujoks	West Germany	11.1	Q
2	3	Stanley Orman	Great Britain	11.1	Q
3	3	Raymond Perin	Belgium	11.2	
4	3	Ab. del Helio	Egypt	11.3	
1	4	Jacques Vercruysse	Belgium	11.2	Q
2	4	Francisco Tuduri	Spain	11.5	Q
3	4	John Groves	Great Britain	11.5	
1	5	Sergio D'Asnasch	Italy	11.2	Q
2	5	Graham Robertson	Great Britain	11.2	Q
3	5	José Alonso Peralta	Spain	11.3	
4	5	Reckinger	Luxembourg	11.6	
5	5	Ayad	Egypt	11.8	
1	6	Carvalhais	Portugal	11.1	Q
2	6	Peter Röthig	West Germany	11.2	Q
3	6	Maisin	Belgium	11.3	
4	6	El Eskardarani	Egypt	11.7	

=== Semifinals ===
Rank	Heat	Athlete	Nationality	Time	Notes
1	1	Jacques Vercruysse	Belgium	10.9	Q
2	1	Graham Robertson	Great Britain	11.0	Q
3	1	Mario Colarrosi	Italy	11.1	Q
4	1	Karl-Heinz Naujoks	West Germany	11.2	
5	1	Yoshiaki Hara	Japan	11.2	
6	1	Peter Röthig	West Germany	11.5	
1	2	Lothar Prinz	West Germany	11.0	Q
2	2	Stanley Orman	Great Britain	11.0	Q
3	2	Sergio D'Asnasch	Italy	11.0	Q
4	2	Francisco Tuduri	Spain	11.4	
	2	Kanji Akagi	Japan	??.?	
	2	Carvalhais	Portugal	??.?	

=== Final ===
Rank	Name	Nationality	Time	Notes
1st place, gold medalist(s)	Jacques Vercruysse	Belgium	11.0	
2nd place, silver medalist(s)	Lothar Prinz	West Germany	11.1	
3rd place, bronze medalist(s)	Stanley Orman	Great Britain	11.1	
4	Sergio D'Asnasch	Italy	11.2	
5	Mario Colarrosi	Italy	11.2	
6	Graham Robertson	Great Britain	11.3	
