= Athletics at the 1955 Summer International University Sports Week – Men's 200 metres =

The men's 200 metres event at the 1955 International University Sports Week was held in San Sebastián on 11 and 12 August 1955.

== Medalists ==
Gold	Silver	Bronze
Grant Scruggs; United States	Karl-Heinz Naujoks; West Germany	Lothar Prinz; West Germany

== Results ==
=== Heats ===
Rank	Heat	Athlete	Nationality	Time	Notes
1	1	Lothar Prinz	West Germany	22.3	Q
2	1	Wotton	Great Britain	22.3	Q
3	1	Arie Gluck	Israel	23.4	
4	1	Francisco Tuduri	Spain	23.7	
1	2	Grant Scruggs	United States	22.7	Q
2	2	Maisin	Belgium	23.0	Q
3	2	Rui Trincheiras	Portugal	23.4	
1	3	Graham Robertson	Great Britain	23.6	Q
2	3	Wolfango Montanari	Italy	27.5	Q
1	4	Kanji Akagi	Japan	22.6	Q
2	4	Karl-Heinz Naujoks	West Germany	22.7	Q
3	4	Carvalhais	Portugal	23.0	
1	5	Raymond Perin	Belgium	22.6	Q
2	5	Mario Colarrosi	Italy	22.8	Q
3	5	Gwilym Roberts	Great Britain	23.0	
3	5	Yoshiaki Hara	Japan	23.4	
1	6	Jacques Vercruysse	Belgium	22.1	Q
2	6	Sergio D'Asnasch	Italy	22.5	Q
3	6	Peter Röthig	West Germany	22.8	
4	6	Pierfancesco Campana	Switzerland	23.4	

=== Semifinals ===
Rank	Heat	Athlete	Nationality	Time	Notes
1	1	Jacques Vercruysse	Belgium	22.1	Q
2	1	Grant Scruggs	United States	22.2	Q
3	1	Sergio D'Asnasch	Italy	22.6	Q
4	1	Wotton	Great Britain	22.6	
5	1	Graham Robertson	Great Britain	22.7	
6	1	Mario Colarrosi	Italy	22.8	
1	2	Lothar Prinz	West Germany	22.2	Q
2	2	Karl-Heinz Naujoks	West Germany	22.3	Q
3	2	Kanji Akagi	Japan	22.4	Q
4	2	Raymond Perin	Belgium	22.4	
5	2	Maisin	Belgium	23.0	
	2	Wolfango Montanari	Italy	DNS	

=== Final ===
Rank	Name	Nationality	Time	Notes
1st place, gold medalist(s)	Grant Scruggs	United States	21.7	GR
2nd place, silver medalist(s)	Karl-Heinz Naujoks	West Germany	21.8	
3rd place, bronze medalist(s)	Lothar Prinz	West Germany	21.9	
4	Jacques Vercruysse	Belgium	22.3	
5	Sergio D'Asnasch	Italy	22.3	
6	Kanji Akagi	Japan	22.3	
