= Athletics at the 1955 Summer International University Sports Week – Men's 1500 metres =

The men's 1500 metres event at the 1955 International University Sports Week was held in San Sebastián on 14 August 1955.

== Results ==
| Rank | Name | Nationality | Time | Notes |
|---|---|---|---|---|
| 1st place, gold medalist(s) | John Evans | Great Britain | 3:51.9 | |
| 2nd place, silver medalist(s) | Martin Walmsley | Great Britain | 3:52.1 | |
| 3rd place, bronze medalist(s) | David Law | Great Britain | 3:53.4 | |
| 4 | Tomás Barris | Spain | 3:54.2 | |
| 5 | Klaus Retiene | West Germany | 3:54.5 | |
| 6 | Stephan Lüpfert | West Germany | 3:55.7 | |
| 7 | John Moule | Canada | ?:??.? | |
| 8 | Jiro Yamauchi | Japan | ?:??.? | |
| 9 | Giuliano Gelmi | Italy | ?:??.? | |
| 10 | Josef Sidler | Switzerland | ?:??.? | |
| 11 | Sim Sang-ok | South Korea | ?:??.? | |
