= Athletics at the 1954 British Empire and Commonwealth Games – Men's 880 yards =

Men's 880 yards at the Commonwealth Games
- Venue: Empire Stadium
- Dates: 1 and 4 August

The men's 880 yards event at the 1954 British Empire and Commonwealth Games was held on 1 and 4 August at the Empire Stadium in Vancouver, Canada.

== Medalists ==
Gold	Silver	Bronze
Derek Johnson; England	Brian Hewson; England	Ian Boyd; England

== Results ==
=== Heats ===
Qualification: First 3 in each heat (Q) qualify directly for the final.

Rank	Heat	Name	Nationality	Time	Notes
1	1	Derek Johnson	England	1:51.6	Q
2	1	Bill Baillie	New Zealand	1:52.3	Q
3	1	Bill Parnell	Canada	1:53.2	Q
4	1	Don MacMillan	Australia	1:54.5	
5	1	William Kwateng	Gold Coast	1:57.7	
6	1	Richard Estick	Jamaica	2:02.5	
8	1	Cyril Johnson	Bahamas	2:10.2	
1	2	Brian Hewson	England	1:52.7	Q
2	2	Rich Ferguson	Canada	1:53.2	Q
3	2	Jim Hamilton	Scotland	1:53.3	Q
4	2	David Law	England	1:53.4	
5	2	James Hutchins	Canada	1:55.1	
6	2	Peter Phillips	Wales	1:58.7	
	2	Victor Milligan	Northern Ireland	DNS	
1	3	Jim Bailey	Australia	1:54.2	Q
2	3	Doug Clement	Canada	1:55.1	Q
3	3	Ian Boyd	England	1:56.0	Q
4	3	Kiptalam Keter	Kenya	2:01.0	
	3	Louis Gooden	Jamaica	DNS	

=== Final ===
Rank	Name	Nationality	Time	Notes
1st place, gold medalist(s)	Derek Johnson	England	1:50.7	GR
2nd place, silver medalist(s)	Brian Hewson	England	1:51.2	
3rd place, bronze medalist(s)	Ian Boyd	England	1:51.9	
4	Bill Baillie	New Zealand	1:52.5	
5	Rich Ferguson	Canada	1:52.7	
6	Jim Hamilton	Scotland	1:52.7	
7	Bill Parnell	Canada	1:53.8	
8	Doug Clement	Canada	1:54.9	
	Jim Bailey	Australia	DNF	
