= John MacIsaac (sprinter) =

Scottish athlete

Personal information
- Nationality: British (Scottish)
- Born: 6 June 1937 (age 89)

Sport
- Sport: Athletics
- Event: 440y
- Club: Victoria Park AAC
Medal record
Representing Great Britain
athletics
European Championships
Gold medal – first place	1958 Stockholm	4 × 400 m relay

John V. MacIsaac (born 6 June 1937) is a former track and field athlete from Scotland who competed at the 1958 British Empire and Commonwealth Games (now Commonwealth Games).

== Biography ==
MacIsaac was a member of the Victoria Park Amateur Athletic Club.

In February 1958 he was named by the Scottish AAA in the 'possibles list' for the forthcoming Commonwealth and Empire Games and defeated Donald McDonald in the 440 yards at the 1958 Western District Championships.

He represented the Scottish Empire and Commonwealth Games team at the 1958 British Empire Games in Cardiff, Wales, participating in two events, the 440 yards and the 4 × 440 yards relay, with Ronnie Thomson, Jim Paterson and Donald MacDonald.

MacIsaac won a gold medal with the Great Britain 4 × 400 metres relay team at the 1958 European Athletics Championships, with John Salisbury, John Wrighton and Ted Sampson.
