= Athletics at the 1955 Summer International University Sports Week – Men's 4 × 100 metres relay =

The men's 4 × 100 metres relay event at the 1955 International University Sports Week was held in San Sebastián on 12 and 13 August 1955.

== Results ==
=== Heats ===
Rank	Heat	Nation	Athletes	Time	Notes
1	1	Italy	Mario Colarrosi, Sergio D'Asnasch, Angelo De Fraia, Franco Panizza	43.9	Q
2	1	Japan	Chono Teruya, Kanji Akagi, Yushiro Sonoda, Yoshiaki Hara	43.9	Q
3	1	Belgium	Jacques Bierlaire, Maisin, Raymond Perin, Jacques Vercruysse	44.2	Q
4	1	Spain	Sebastián Junqueras, Francisco Tuduri, Juan Manuel de Hoz, José Alonso Peralta	44.2	
1	2	West Germany	Heinz Oberbeck, Lothar Prinz, Peter Röthig, Karl-Heinz Naujoks	43.1	Q
2	2	Great Britain	Stanley Orman, Graham Robertson, Gwilym Roberts, John Groves	44.3	Q
3	2	Portugal	Rui Trincheiras, João Coutinho, Correira, Carvalhais	44.7	Q

=== Final ===
Rank	Nation	Athletes	Time	Notes
1st place, gold medalist(s)	West Germany	Heinz Oberbeck, Lothar Prinz, Peter Röthig, Karl-Heinz Naujoks	42.5	
2nd place, silver medalist(s)	Italy	Mario Colarrosi, Sergio D'Asnasch, Angelo De Fraia, Franco Panizza	42.5	
3rd place, bronze medalist(s)	Great Britain	Stanley Orman, Graham Robertson, Gwilym Roberts, John Groves	43.1	
4	Japan	Chono Teruya, Kanji Akagi, Yushiro Sonoda, Yoshiaki Hara	43.4	
5	Belgium	Jacques Bierlaire, Maisin, Raymond Perin, Jacques Vercruysse	43.4	
	Portugal		?	
