= Athletics at the 1958 British Empire and Commonwealth Games – Men's 440 yards hurdles =

Men's 440 yards hurdles at the Commonwealth Games

The men's 440 yards hurdles event at the 1958 British Empire and Commonwealth Games was held on 20 and 22 July at the Cardiff Arms Park in Cardiff, Wales.

== Medalists ==
Gold	Silver	Bronze
Gert Potgieter; South Africa	David Lean; Australia	Bartonjo Rotich; Kenya

== Results ==
=== Heats ===
Qualification: First 4 in each heat (Q) qualify directly for the semifinals.

Rank	Heat	Name	Nationality	Time	Notes
1	1	Gert Potgieter	South Africa	51.9	Q, GR
2	1	Bartonjo Rotich	Kenya	52.8	Q
3	1	Chris Goudge	England	53.3	Q
4	1	Muhammad Yaqub	Pakistan	53.6	Q
5	1	Wilton Jackson	Trinidad and Tobago	1:06.2	
1	2	David Lean	Australia	52.0	Q
2	2	Alec Hannah	Scotland	53.9	Q
3	2	John Metcalf	England	54.7	Q
4	2	Bob Shaw	Wales	55.0	Q
5	2	Jagdev Singh	India	55.4	
1	3	George Shepherd	Canada	53.3	Q
2	3	Tom Farrell	England	53.4	Q
3	3	Mark Cumming	Northern Ireland	55.4	Q
4	3	Wahid Usmani	India	55.6	Q
5	3	David Westerhout	England	55.7	

=== Semifinals ===
Qualification: First 3 in each heat (Q) qualify directly for the final.

Rank	Heat	Name	Nationality	Time	Notes
1	1	Gert Potgieter	South Africa	51.1	Q, GR
2	1	John Metcalf	England	53.4	Q
3	1	George Shepherd	Canada	53.4	Q
4	1	Alec Hannah	Scotland	53.9	
5	1	Wahid Usmani	India	57.0	
6	1	Muhammad Yaqub	Pakistan	57.0	
1	2	David Lean	Australia	51.8	Q
2	2	Bartonjo Rotich	Kenya	52.9	Q
3	2	Chris Goudge	England	53.3	Q
4	2	Bob Shaw	Wales	54.2	
5	2	Mark Cumming	Northern Ireland	59.2	
	2	Tom Farrell	England	DNF	

=== Final ===
Rank	Lane	Name	Nationality	Time	Notes
1st place, gold medalist(s)	5	Gert Potgieter	South Africa	49.73	WR
2nd place, silver medalist(s)	6	David Lean	Australia	50.59	
3rd place, bronze medalist(s)	2	Bartonjo Rotich	Kenya	51.75	
4	1	John Metcalf	England	52.4	
5	4	Chris Goudge	England	52.5	
6	3	George Shepherd	Canada	52.8	
