= Athletics at the 1955 Summer International University Sports Week – Women's javelin throw =

The women's javelin throw event at the 1955 International University Sports Week was held in San Sebastián on 12 August 1955.

== Results ==
Rank	Name	Nationality	Result	Notes
1st place, gold medalist(s)	Almut Brömmel	West Germany	45.44	GR
2nd place, silver medalist(s)	Ursula Dreimann	West Germany	38.65	
3rd place, bronze medalist(s)	Edith Schiller	West Germany	36.87	
4	Jean Elliott	Great Britain	35.25	
5	Medalia	Israel	33.43	
6	Lesley Line	Great Britain	27.47	
