= Michael Wheeler (athlete) =

British athlete (1935–2020)

Mike Wheeler
Personal information
- Nationality: British (English)
- Born: 14 February 1935 Watford, England
- Died: 15 January 2020 (aged 84) Poole, England
- Height: 187 cm (6 ft 2 in)
- Weight: 76 kg (168 lb)

Sport
- Sport: Athletics
- Event: 400m
- Club: London Athletic Club; Bournemouth AC
Medal record
Representing Great Britain
Men's Athletics
Bronze medal – third place	1956 Melbourne	4x400 metre relay

Michael Keith Valentine Wheeler (14 February 1935 – 15 January 2020) was a British athlete who competed the 1956 Summer Olympics.

== Biography ==
Wheeler was educated at Taunton School, where he played arugby and competed in athletics. He won the 1952 England schools 440 yards title at the White City Stadium. The following year he won the 100 yards and 440 yards titles at the English Schools championships.

He joined London Athletic Club in 1954 before moving to Bournemouth AC in 1955. Wheeler finished second behind Peter Fryer in the 440 yards event at the 1955 AAA Championships. Wheeler became the British 440 yards champion after winning the British AAA Championships title at the 1956 AAA Championships.

Later that year he represented Great Britain at the 1956 Olympic Games in Melbourne, where he won the bronze medal in the 4 × 400 metres relay with his teammates Peter Higgins, John Salisbury, and Derek Johnson.

In 1956, Wheeler set an 100 yards English record, recording 9.8 seconds when winning the Hampshire 100 yards title. He had eleven international appearances from 1955 to 1956 before retiring from athletics in 1966.
