= Athletics at the 1955 Summer International University Sports Week – Men's 400 metres hurdles =

The men's 400 metres hurdles event at the 1955 Summer International University Sports Week was held in San Sebastián on 11 and 13 August 1955.

== Medalists ==
Gold	Silver	Bronze
Jan Parlevliet; Netherlands	Gianfranco Fantuzzi; Italy	Clive Dennis; Great Britain

== Results ==
=== Heats ===
Rank	Heat	Athlete	Nationality	Time	Notes
1	1	Gianfranco Fantuzzi	Italy	54.2	Q
2	1	Jan Parlevliet	Netherlands	54.5	Q
3	1	Clive Dennis	Great Britain	56.2	Q
4	1	Rudolf Böck	West Germany	56.6	
5	1	Donal O'Sullivan	Great Britain	1:07.5	
1	2	Giovanni Bonanno	Italy	55.0	Q
2	2	Derek Salter	Great Britain	55.9	Q
3	2	Helmut Joho	West Germany	56.1	Q
4	2	Edgard Kloß	West Germany	56.1	
5	2	Francisco Javier Sáinz	Spain	58.2	

=== Final ===
Rank	Name	Nationality	Time	Notes
1st place, gold medalist(s)	Jan Parlevliet	Netherlands	53.8	
2nd place, silver medalist(s)	Gianfranco Fantuzzi	Italy	53.9	
3rd place, bronze medalist(s)	Clive Dennis	Great Britain	54.8	
4	Giovanni Bonanno	Italy	55.6	
5	Derek Salter	Great Britain	57.0	
6	Helmut Joho	West Germany	57.8	
