= Athletics at the 1954 British Empire and Commonwealth Games – Men's 4 × 440 yards relay =

Men's 4 × 440 yards relay at the Commonwealth Games
- Venue: Empire Stadium
- Dates: 7 August

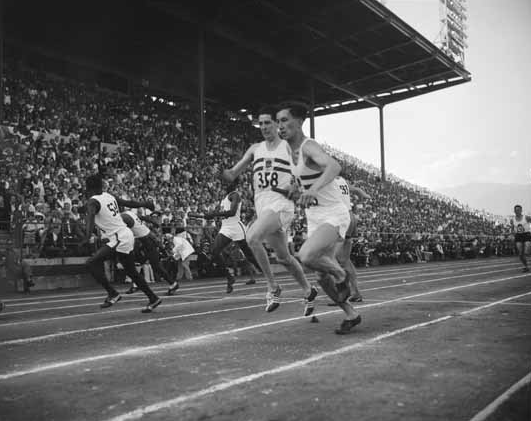
The 1 mile relay race at the games. Attribution:Province newspaper

The men's 4 × 440 yards relay event at the 1954 British Empire and Commonwealth Games was held on 7 August at the Empire Stadium in Vancouver, Canada.

== Results ==
Rank	Nation	Athletes	Time	Notes
1st place, gold medalist(s)	England	Peter Higgins, Alan Dick, Peter Fryer, Derek Johnson	3:11.2	GR
2nd place, silver medalist(s)	Canada	Laird Sloan, Douglas Clement, Joe Foreman, Terry Tobacco	3:11.6	
3rd place, bronze medalist(s)	Australia	Brian Oliver, Don MacMillan, David Lean, Kevan Gosper	3:16.0	
4	Kenya	Kiptalam Keter, Kipkorir Boit Kibet, Korigo Barno, Musembi Mbathi	3:17.6	
5	Gold Coast	Edward Nyako, Henry Ofori-Nayako, John Quartey, Richard Ampadu	3:18.6	
6	Jamaica	Keith Gardner, Les Laing, Louis Gooden, Richard Estick	3:19.0	
