= Athletics at the 1959 Pan American Games – Men's 800 metres =

Men's 800 metres at the Pan American Games

The men's 800 metres event at the 1959 Pan American Games was held at the Soldier Field in Chicago on 28, 29 and 30 August.

== Medalists ==
Gold	Silver	Bronze
Tom Murphy; United States	George Kerr; British West Indies	Tony Seth; British Guiana

== Results ==
=== Heats ===
Rank	Heat	Name	Nationality	Time	Notes
1	1	George Kerr	British West Indies	1:52.9	Q
2	1	Ernie Cunliffe	United States	1:53.7	Q
3	1	Allan Andrews	Canada	1:53.9	Q
4	1	Jossué Delgado	Puerto Rico	1:54.4	Q
5	1	Julio León	Chile	1:55.5	Q
6	1	José Heredia	Mexico	?:??.?	
	1	Peter Ostermeyer	Brazil	DNS	
1	2	Tom Murphy	United States	1:52.5	Q
2	2	Mel Spence	British West Indies	1:53.5	Q
3	2	Hugo Krauss	Chile	1:55.0	Q
4	2	Stan Worsfold	Canada	1:56.0	Q
5	2	Emigdio Torres	Cuba	1:56.3	Q
6	2	Alejandro Arroyo	Ecuador	1:58.2	
	2	Ralph Gomes	British Guiana	DNS	
	2	Anubes da Silva	Brazil	DNS	
1	3	Jerome Walters	United States	1:53.9	Q
2	3	Tony Seth	British Guiana	1:54.0	Q
3	3	Ramón Sandoval	Chile	1:54.3	Q
4	3	José Manuel Luna	Mexico	1:54.3	Q
5	3	Siegmar Ohlemann	Canada	1:55.0	Q
6	3	Argemiro Roque	Brazil	1:55.3	
	3	Guillermo Rocca	Venezuela	DNS	

=== Semifinals ===
Rank	Heat	Name	Nationality	Time	Notes
1	1	Tom Murphy	United States	1:50.9	Q
2	1	Tony Seth	British Guiana	1:51.7	Q
3	1	Mel Spence	British West Indies	1:51.9	Q
4	1	Stan Worsfold	Canada	1:52.2	Q
5	1	Jossué Delgado	Puerto Rico	1:52.7	
6	1	Hugo Krauss	Chile	1:53.5	
7	1	José Manuel Luna	Mexico	1:54.5	
8	1	Julio León	Chile	?:??.?	
1	2	Jerome Walters	United States	1:51.1	Q
2	2	George Kerr	British West Indies	1:51.6	Q
3	2	Siegmar Ohlemann	Canada	1:51.9	Q
4	2	Ernie Cunliffe	United States	1:52.1	Q
5	2	Emigdio Torres	Cuba	1:52.4	
6	2	Ramón Sandoval	Chile	1:55.0	
7	2	Allan Andrews	Canada	1:55.2	

=== Final ===
Rank	Name	Nationality	Time	Notes
1st place, gold medalist(s)	Tom Murphy	United States	1:49.4	
2nd place, silver medalist(s)	George Kerr	British West Indies	1:49.4	
3rd place, bronze medalist(s)	Tony Seth	British Guiana	1:49.7	
4	Mel Spence	British West Indies	1:50.0	
5	Ernie Cunliffe	United States	1:51.5	
6	Stan Worsfold	Canada	1:52.4	
7	Siegmar Ohlemann	Canada	1:53.3	
	Jerome Walters	United States	DNF	
