= Athletics at the 1963 Summer Universiade – Women's discus throw =

The women's discus throw event at the 1963 Summer Universiade was held at the Estádio Olímpico Monumental in Porto Alegre in September 1963.

== Results ==
Rank	Athlete	Nationality	Result	Notes
1st place, gold medalist(s)	Tamara Press	Soviet Union	55.90	
2nd place, silver medalist(s)	Jolán Kleiber-Kontsek	Hungary	50.92	
3rd place, bronze medalist(s)	Judit Bognár	Hungary	49.73	
4	Almut Brömmel	West Germany	42.68	
5	Myriam Yutronic	Chile	42.51	
6	Ana Ingrid Käbisch	Brazil	30.65	
7	Sigrid Anna Grabert	Brazil	24.77	
