= Athletics at the 1955 Summer International University Sports Week – Women's high jump =

The women's high jump event at the 1955 International University Sports Week was held in San Sebastián on 14 August 1955.

== Results ==
Rank	Name	Nationality	Result	Notes
1st place, gold medalist(s)	Lesley Line	Great Britain	1.55	
2nd place, silver medalist(s)	Ursula Schitteck	West Germany	1.45	
3rd place, bronze medalist(s)	Mary Bridgeford	Great Britain	1.40	
4	Babette Schweizer	Switzerland	1.40	
