= Athletics at the 1955 Summer International University Sports Week – Men's pentathlon =

The men's pentathlon event at the 1955 International University Sports Week was held in San Sebastián on 11 and 12 August 1955.

== Results ==
The highest mark recorded in each event is highlighted in yellow

Rank	Athlete	Nationality	LJ	JT	200m	DT	1500m	Points	Notes
1st place, gold medalist(s)	Walter Tschudi	Switzerland	6.36	45.77	23.4	32.20	4:19.2	2797	
2nd place, silver medalist(s)	Edy Egli	Switzerland	6.51	43.47	23.1	34.89	4:31.0	2784	
3rd place, bronze medalist(s)	Hans von Schnering	West Germany	5.94	55.06	23.6	33.33	4:28.6	2761	
4	Manuel Francisco González	Spain	6.39	48.49	23.5	35.43	4:52.4	2609	
5	Jacques Vanden Abeele	Belgium	6.39	35.32	23.3	33.92	4:36.2	2511	
6	Watkins	Great Britain	6.38	47.87	24.1	34.39	4:56.8	2460	
7	Leonhard Zanier	Austria	6.60	42.43	23.8	40.52	5:46.0	2453	
8	Ernst Huggel	Switzerland	6.20	49.59	24.4	35.47	4:56.2	2440	
9	Claudio Riccardi	Italy	5.55	50.62	25.7	25.38	4:15.4	2322	
10	Pierre Bultiauw	Belgium	6.31	43.19	23.8	32.51	5:05.4	2296	
11	Valerio Colatore	Italy	6.97	42.25	23.7	28.07	?	2150	
