= Athletics at the 1955 Summer International University Sports Week – Men's hammer throw =

The men's hammer throw event at the 1955 International University Sports Week was held in San Sebastián on 11 August 1955.

== Medalists ==
| Gold | Silver | Bronze |
|---|---|---|
| John Bard; United States | Takami Ogasawara; Japan | Robert Scott; Great Britain |

== Results ==
=== Qualification ===
| Rank | Athlete | Nationality | Result | Notes |
|---|---|---|---|---|
| 1 | John Bard | United States | 51.09 | Q |
| 2 | Takami Ogasawara | Japan | 47.18 | Q |
| 3 | Haroldo Guimarães | Brazil | 45.95 | Q |
| 4 | Carl Goldman | United States | 45.61 | Q |
| 5 | Peter Harpel | United States | 45.05 | Q |
| 6 | Robert Scott | Great Britain | 44.77 | Q |
| 7 | Corrado Laliscia | Italy | 41.37 | |
| 8 | Clement | West Germany | 41.18 | |
| 9 | Shinsuke Tanada | Japan | 39.91 | |
| 10 | José del Pino | Spain | 38.28 | |
| 11 | Heinz Lutter | West Germany | 33.97 | |

=== Final ===
| Rank | Name | Nationality | Result | Notes |
|---|---|---|---|---|
| 1st place, gold medalist(s) | John Bard | United States | 51.09 | |
| 2nd place, silver medalist(s) | Takami Ogasawara | Japan | 49.97 | |
| 3rd place, bronze medalist(s) | Robert Scott | Great Britain | 48.64 | |
| 4 | Haroldo Guimarães | Brazil | 48.37 | |
| 5 | Carl Goldman | United States | 45.61 | |
| 6 | Peter Harpel | United States | 45.05 | |
