= Athletics at the 1963 Summer Universiade – Women's javelin throw =

The women's javelin throw event at the 1963 Summer Universiade was held at the Estádio Olímpico Monumental in Porto Alegre in September 1963.

== Results ==
Rank	Athlete	Nationality	Result	Notes
1st place, gold medalist(s)	Almut Brömmel	West Germany	49.61	
2nd place, silver medalist(s)	Elvira Ozolina	Soviet Union	47.00	
3rd place, bronze medalist(s)	Barbara Decker	West Germany	43.91	
4	Jolán Kleiber-Kontsek	Hungary	39.60	
5	Carmen Brea	Venezuela	32.95	
6	Ana Ingrid Käbisch	Brazil	22.63	
