= Alec Hannah =

Scottish athlete

Personal information
- Nationality: British (Scottish)
- Born: c.1937.

Sport
- Sport: Athletics
- Event: Hurdles
- Club: Edinburgh University AC

Alexander H. Hannah (born c.1937) is a former track and field athlete from Scotland who competed at the 1958 British Empire and Commonwealth Games (now Commonwealth Games).

== Biography ==
Hannah attended Preston Lodge High School and studied at the University of Edinburgh and was a member of their athletic club.

Hannah won the Scottish 440 yards hurdles title at the 1956 AAA Championships and retained his 440 yards hurdles title at the 1957 at the S.A.A.A Championships.

In February 1958 he was named by the Scottish AAA in the 'possibles list' for the forthcoming Commonwealth and Empire Games and soon after set a record at the 1958 Universities national championships. He won a third consecutive 440 yards hurdles title at the 1958 Scottish A.A.A. Championships, and in addition finished second in the 120 yards hurdles.

He represented the Scottish Empire and Commonwealth Games team at the 1958 British Empire Games in Cardiff, Wales, participating in one event, the 440 yards hurdles.
