= Wilton Jackson =

Trinidad and Tobago sprinter

Personal information
- Nationality: Trinidad and Tobago
- Born: 15 November 1935 (age 90)

Sport
- Sport: Sprinting
- Event: 100 metres
Medal record
Men's athletics
Representing British West Indies
Pan American Games
Bronze medal – third place	1959 Chicago	4×100 m

Wilton Jackson (born 15 November 1935) is a Trinidad and Tobago sprinter.

Wilton Jackson took part in the 4 x 440 yards relay at the 1958 British Empire and Commonwealth Games in Cardiff. Trinidad and Tobago did not qualify for the final.

Representing the British West Indies, Jackson took bronze in the 4×100 metres relay at the 1959 Pan American Games. At the 1962 Central American and Caribbean Games, Jackson took part in both relay events with the Trinidad and Tobago team, winning silver in both events.

He competed in the men's 100 metres at the 1964 Summer Olympics, finishing fifth in his heat with a time of 10.6 seconds. Jackson appeared at the 1967 Pan American Games, this time representing Trinidad and Tobago, where his team came fourth in the final of the 4 x 100 metres relay.

== International competitions ==
Year	Competition	Venue	Position	Event	Notes
Representing Trinidad and Tobago
1958	British West Indies Championships	Port of Spain, Trinidad and Tobago	3rd	400 m	48.5
1958	British Empire and Commonwealth Games	Cardiff, United Kingdom	20th (qf)	440 y	49.2
1958	British Empire and Commonwealth Games	Cardiff, United Kingdom	15th (h)	440 y hurdles	66.2
1958	British Empire and Commonwealth Games	Cardiff, United Kingdom	8th (h)	4 × 440 y relay	3:19.8
1959	British West Indies Championships	Georgetown, British Guiana	1st	200 m	21.4
1959	Pan American Games^{1}	Chicago, United States	11th (sf)	100 m	10.6
1959	Pan American Games^{1}	Chicago, United States	9th (sf)	200 m	21.9
1959	Pan American Games^{1}	Chicago, United States	3rd	4 × 100 m relay	41.1
1960	British West Indies Championships	Kingston, Jamaica	1st	200 m	21.1
1962	Central American and Caribbean Games	Kingston, Jamaica	5th	200 m	21.7
1962	Central American and Caribbean Games	Kingston, Jamaica	2nd	4 × 100 m relay	40.7
1962	Central American and Caribbean Games	Kingston, Jamaica	2nd	4 × 400 m relay	3:12.5
1964	Olympic Games	Tokyo, Japan	22nd (h)	100 m	10.6
1967	Pan American Games^{1}	Winnipeg, Canada	4th	4 × 100 m relay	40.16

^{1}Representing the British West Indies
