= British West Indies at the 1959 Pan American Games =

- IOC code: BWI

in Chicago 28 August 28–7 September 1959.
- Medals Ranked 7th: Gold 2 Silver 4 Bronze 7 Total 13

Pan American Games appearances (overview)
- 1959

The West Indies Federation took part in the 3rd Pan American Games, held in Chicago, USA from 28 August 28 to 7 September 1959, under the name British West Indies. These were the only Pan American Games attended by the British West Indies, as the nation dissolved in 1962. British West Indies ended up 7th on the overall medal table, and 2nd on the medal table for Athletics.

== Medals ==
=== Gold ===
===== Athletics =====
- Men's 400 metres: George Kerr
- Men's 4×400 metres Relay: Mal Spence, Mel Spence, Basil Ince, and George Kerr

=== Silver ===
===== Athletics =====
- Men's 800 metres: George Kerr
- Men's 100 metres: Mike Agostini
- Men's 400 metres: Basil Ince

===== Weightlifting =====
- Featherweight (-60 kg): Maurice King

=== Bronze ===
===== Athletics =====
- Men's Long Jump: Lester Bird
- Men's High Jump: Ernle Haisley
- Men's 4×100 metres Relay: Dennis Johnson, Clifton Bertrand, Wilton Jackson, Mike Agostini
- Men's 400 metres: Mal Spence
- Men's 200 metres: Mike Agostini

===== Weightlifting =====
- Bantamweight (-56 kg): Grantley Sobers
- Middleweight (-75 kg): Fred Marville

== Other notable competitors ==
Mahoney Samuels took 8th place in the Triple Jump.
The Water Polo team included Barbadians John Burke, Reds Packer, Albert Weatherhead and Geoffrey Foster, who, apart from Fred Marville, were the only Barbadians in the West Indies contingent

== See also ==
- British West Indies at the 1960 Summer Olympics
