= Grantley Sobers =

Barbadian weightlifter (born 1937)

Personal information
- Nationality: Barbadian
- Born: 16 May 1937 (age 89)

Sport
- Sport: Weightlifting
Medal record
Men's athletics
Representing British West Indies
Pan American Games
Bronze medal – third place	1959 Chicago	Bantamweight

Grantley Sobers (born 16 May 1937) is a Barbadian weightlifter. Sobers represented the British West Indies at the 1959 Pan American Games, where he won the bronze medal in the Bantamweight competition. He competed in the men's bantamweight event at the 1960 Summer Olympics, finishing in 10th position with a lift of 307.5 kg.
