= Robert Hay (athlete) =

Scottish athlete

Personal information
- Nationality: British (Scottish)
- Born: 19 November 1938 Sunderland, England
- Died: 30 March 2022 (aged 83) Edinburgh, Scotland

Sport
- Sport: Athletics
- Event(s): Hurdles, 440y
- Club: Edinburgh University AC; Heriot's Former Pupils AC; Octavians AC, Edinburgh
Medal record
Representing Great Britain
Summer Universiade
Bronze medal – third place	1959 Turin	4x400m relay

Robert Lawrie Hay (19 November 1938 – 30 March 2022) was a track and field athlete from Scotland who competed at the 1958 British Empire and Commonwealth Games (now Commonwealth Games).

== Biography ==
Hay was educated at George Heriot's School and studied medicine at the University of Edinburgh and was a member of their athletic club. He specialised in hurdles but also ran the quarter-mile on the flat.

At the 1958 Scottish A.A.A. Championships, he finished third behind John Paterson.

He represented the Scottish Empire and Commonwealth Games team at the 1958 British Empire Games in Cardiff, Wales, participating in one event, the 440 yards race.

In June 1959 he retained his East of Scotland Championships title over 440 yards and was the 1959 Scottish 440 yards champion. Primarily a hurder, Hay won five consecutive Scottish 440 yards titles between 1959 and 1963.

He married Dr Alice Joan Whittell in March 1963 and worked at the Royal Infirmary of Edinburgh. He died in 2022.
