= Maurice King (weightlifter) =

Saint Vincentian weightlifter

Personal information
- Nationality: St Vincent and the Grenadines

Sport
- Sport: Weightlifting
- Event: Featherweight
Medal record
Men's weightlifting
Representing British West Indies
Pan American Games
Silver medal – second place	1959 Chicago	Bantamweight

Maurice King is a Vincentian former weightlifter.

King represented the British West Indies at the 1959 Pan American Games in Chicago, USA, taking silver in the Bantamweight division.
At the 1966 British Empire and Commonwealth Games in Kingston, Jamaica, King represented St Vincent and the Grenadines in the 67.5 kg Combined competition.
