= 1957 British West Indies Championships =

The 1957 British West Indies Championships was the first edition of the track and field competition between British colony nations in the Caribbean. Held in Kingston, Jamaica, it was supported by retired Olympic sprint medallist Herb McKenley. A total of eighteen events were contested, all of them by men – women's events were not added until two years later.

Two athletes completed individual doubles: Jamaica's Ernle Haisley won the high jump and pole vault, while George de Peana of British Guiana had a long-distance running double. Also among the medallists was Lester Bird of Antigua who would later go on to be the Prime Minister of Antigua and Barbuda (succeeding his father, Vere Bird).

== Medal summary ==
Event	Gold		Silver		Bronze	
100 metres	Hendrickson Harewood (TRI)	10.4	Joe Goddard (TRI)	10.6	Tom Robinson (BAH)	10.6
200 metres	Clifton Bertrand (TRI)	21.2	Joe Goddard (TRI)	21.3	Hendrickson Harewood (TRI)	21.3
400 metres	Mal Spence (JAM)	47.3	Mel Spence (JAM)	47.6	George Kerr (JAM)	47.7
800 metres	George Kerr (JAM)	1:50.5	Mel Spence (JAM)	1:51.1	Knolly Barnes (TRI)	1:51.2
1500 metres	McDonald Philbert (TRI)	4:05.5	Hugh Hyland (TRI)	4:06.7	Ken Hyland (TRI)	4:06.9
5000 metres	George de Peana (BGU)	15:42.0	Levi Modeste (JAM)	15:49.6	Mervyn Wanliss (JAM)	15:52.8
10,000 metres	George de Peana (BGU)	31:19.5	Joseph Roberts (TRI)	31:34.2	Mervyn Wanliss (JAM)	32:35.0
110 m hurdles	Louis Knight (JAM)	14.6	Keith Gardner (JAM)	14.7	Bill Phillips (JAM)	14.9
400 m hurdles	Leroy Keane (JAM)	55.3	Charles Boney (TRI)	55.6	Horace Hart (TRI) Bill Phillips (JAM)	57.8
4×100 m relay	Jamaica (JAM); Keith Gardner; Mel Spence; Horsham; Louis Knight	41.9	Trinidad and Tobago (TTO)	42.2	Bahamas (BAH)	44.2
4×400 m relay	Jamaica (JAM); Mel Spence; George Kerr ? Mal Spence	3:14.0	Trinidad and Tobago (TTO); Hart; Yamme; Knolly Barnes; Edmund Turton	3:17.0	Bahamas (BAH)	3:35.2
High jump	Ernle Haisley (JAM)	2.04 m	Roy Burgess (BHO)	1.93 m	Learie Scipio (TRI)	1.88 m
Pole vault	Ernle Haisley (JAM)	3.35 m	Bill Phillips (JAM)	3.27 m	Roy Burgess (BHO)	3.12 m
Long jump	Paul Foreman (JAM)	7.36 m	Learie Scipio (TRI)	7.24 m	Lester Bird (ATG)	7.20 m
Triple jump	James Monteith (JAM)	14.08 m	Leroy Williams (TRI)	13.99 m	Paul Foreman (JAM)	13.83 m
Shot put	Conrad Derrick (TRI)	12.65 m	Milton Bernard (JAM)	12.20 m	Calvin Downie (JAM)	11.19 m
Discus throw	Calvin Downie (JAM)	38.57 m	Leroy Williams (TRI)	37.33 m	William Hall (JAM)	36.03 m
Javelin throw	Hugh Garrick (TRI)	49.89 m	Carlton Clarke (TRI)	49.40 m	C. Isaacs (JAM)	46.14 m
