= Donald McDonald (athlete) =

Scottish athlete

Personal information
- Nickname: Donnie
- Nationality: British (Scottish)

Sport
- Sport: Athletics
- Event(s): Sprints, Middle-distance
- Club: Garscube Harriers

Donald A. McDonald is a former track and field athlete from Scotland who competed at the 1958 British Empire and Commonwealth Games (now Commonwealth Games).

== Biography ==
McDonald was a member of the Garscube Harriers and won three titles at the 1958 Dunbartonshire Championships (the 100, 220 and 440 yards). He was defeated by John MacIsaac in the 440 yards but won the 880 yards at the 1958 Western District Championships.

At the 1958 Scottish A.A.A. Championships, he finished runner-up behind Jim Paterson in the 440 yards final but became the Scottish half-mile champion, defeating both Lesley Locke and Jim Paterson.

He represented the Scottish Empire and Commonwealth Games team at the 1958 British Empire Games in Cardiff, Wales, participating in two events, the 880 yards race and the 4 × 440 yards relay, with John MacIsaac, Ronnie Thomson and Jim Paterson.

He later became the Garscube Harriers coach.
