= Keith Parker (athlete) =

England international athlete (1932–2024)

Personal information
- Nationality: British (English)
- Born: 14 September 1932 Morecambe, England
- Died: 27 September 2024 (aged 92) Bahamas

Sport
- Sport: Athletics
- Event: Decathlon / Long jump
- Club: Loughborough College; Lunedsale AC

Keith Holland Parker (14 September 1932 – 27 September 2024) was an athlete who competed for England and later the Bahamas and was a coach for the Bahamas who had a profound impact on their sporting community.

== Athletics career ==
Parker finished second behind Les Pinder in the decathlon event at the 1954 AAA Championships and third behind Malcolm Dodds at the 1955 AAA Championships.

Parker represented the England athletics team in the long jump at the 1958 British Empire and Commonwealth Games in Cardiff, Wales.

== Coaching ==
Parker coached the Bahamas national teams at four Olympic Games, five World Championships, six Pan American Games and four Commonwealth Games.

== Personal life and death ==
Parker moved to the Bahamas in 1959 to teach. He played many sports (Tennis, squash, etc.). Parker died on 27 September 2024, at the age of 92.
