= Mark Cumming (hurdler) =

Northern Irish athlete (born c.1935)

Personal information
- Nationality: British (Northern Irish)
- Born: c.1935

Sport
- Sport: Athletics
- Event: Hurdles / middle-distance
- Club: Queen's Univ, Belfast AC

J. Mark Cumming (born c.1935) is a former athlete from Northern Ireland, who represented Northern Ireland at the British Empire and Commonwealth Games (now Commonwealth Games).

== Biography ==
Cumming attended Queen's University Belfast and was a member of their Athletics Club. He ran middle-distance events and finished runner-up in the half-mile at the 1958 varsity match. He also recorded two minutes flat for the mile in the early part of 1958.

Cumming came to the attention of the NIAAA selectors in May 1958 when he broke the Northern Ireland record over 440 yards hurdles setting a time of 57.2 seconds. At the trials he lowered his 440 yards hurdles record, running 57.2 seconds.

He was named by the Northern Ireland AAA in the final 1958 Northern Irish Team for the forthcoming Empire and Commonwealth Games. He subsequently competed at the 1958 British Empire and Commonwealth Games in Cardiff, Wales, participating in the one athletics event; the 440 yards hurdles.
