= Laurie Khan =

Jamaican sprinter

Personal information
- Nationality: Jamaican
- Born: 14 June 1943 (age 83)

Sport
- Sport: Sprinting
- Event: 400 metres

Laurie Khan (born 14 June 1943) is a Jamaican sprinter. He competed in the men's 400 metres at the 1964 Summer Olympics. He won a gold medal in the 1962 British Empire and Commonwealth Games 4 x 440 yards relay.
