= Tom Murphy (runner) =

American middle-distance runner (1935–2025)

Personal information
- Born: November 21, 1935 New York City, U.S.
- Died: June 18, 2025 (aged 89)
Medal record
Men's Athletics
Representing the United States
Pan American Games
Gold medal – first place	1959 Chicago	800 metres

Thomas Joseph Murphy (November 21, 1935 – June 18, 2025) was an American middle-distance runner, who represented his native country at the 1960 Summer Olympics in Rome, Italy. He is best known for winning the gold medal in the men's 800 metres event at the 1959 Pan American Games in Chicago.

Murphy graduated from Manhattan College in 1958. He died on June 18, 2025, at the age of 89.

== Sources ==
- Tom Murphy at Olympics at Sports-Reference.com (archived)
