= Fred Marville =

Barbadan weightlifter

Personal information
- Nationality: Barbadian

Sport
- Sport: Weightlifting
- Event: Middleweight
Medal record
Men's weightlifting
Representing British West Indies
Pan American Games
Bronze medal – third place	1959 Chicago	Middleweight

Maurice King is a former Barbadan weightlifter.

Marville represented the British West Indies at the 1959 Pan American Games in Chicago, USA, taking bronze in the Middleweight division.
He was the lone Barbadan on the weightlifting team. .
