= Athletics at the 1962 British Empire and Commonwealth Games – Men's long jump =

Men's long jump at the 1962 British Empire and Commonwealth Games
- Venue: Perry Lakes Stadium
- Date: 26 November 1962
- Competitors: 19 from 13 nations
- Winning distance: 26 ft 5 in (8.05 m) GR

Medalists
gold medal	Michael Ahey	Ghana
silver medal	Dave Norris	New Zealand
bronze medal	Wellesley Clayton	Jamaica

The men's long jump at the 1962 British Empire and Commonwealth Games as part of the athletics programme was held at the Perry Lakes Stadium on Saturday 24 November 1962.

The event was won by Ghanaian Michael Ahey with a jump of 26 ft 5 in (8.05 m), setting a new Games record. Ahey won by 1 ft 3/4 in (32 cm), ahead of New Zealand's Dave Norris and Wellesley Clayton from Jamaica who won the bronze medal.

== Medalists ==
Gold	Silver	Bronze
Michael Ahey; Ghana Ghana	Dave Norris; New Zealand	Wellesley Clayton; Jamaica

== Records ==
Prior to the competition, the records were as follows:

World record	Ralph Boston (USA)	27 ft 1 3/4 in (8.27 m)	Moscow, Soviet Union	16 July 1961
Commonwealth record				
Games record	Ken Wilmshurst (ENG)	24 ft 8 3/4 in (7.54 m)	Vancouver, Canada	6 August 1954

The following new championship (games) and national records were set during the competition:

Date	Event	Athlete	Distance	Notes
24 November	Final	Ghana	26 ft 5 in (8.05 m)	GR
24 November	Final	Wales	25 ft 4 in (7.72 m)	NR

== Final ==
Rank	Name	Nationality	Result	Notes
1st place, gold medalist(s)	Michael Ahey	Ghana	26 ft 5 in (8.05 m)	GR
2nd place, silver medalist(s)	Dave Norris	New Zealand	25 ft 4 3/4 in (7.74 m)	
3rd place, bronze medalist(s)	Wellesley Clayton	Jamaica	25 ft 4 1/4 in (7.73 m)	
4	Lynn Davies	Wales	25 ft 4 in (7.72 m)	NR
5	John Baguley	Australia	25 ft 1 in (7.65 m)	
6	Ian Tomlinson	Australia	24 ft 6 1/4 in (7.47 m)	
7	Paul Odhiambo	Kenya	24 ft 4 in (7.42 m)	
8	John Howell	England	24 ft 2 3/4 in (7.39 m)	
9	Fred Alsop	England	24 ft 2 1/4 in (7.37 m)	
10	William Kamanyi	Uganda	23 ft 11 1/2 in (7.30 m)	
11	Sev Obura	Uganda	23 ft 9 1/4 in (7.25 m)	
12	Allen Crawley	Papua New Guinea	23 ft 8 3/4 in (7.23 m)	
13	Victor Brooks	Jamaica	23 ft 8 1/2 in (7.23 m)	
=14	Jim McCann	Australia	23 ft 1 1/4 in (7.04 m)	
=14	John Blackmore	Australia	23 ft 1 1/4 in (7.04 m)	
16	Roy Collins	Rhodesia and Nyasaland	22 ft 10 1/4 in (6.97 m)	
17	Gabuh Piging	British North Borneo	22 ft 7 in (6.88 m)	
18	Joseph Lee Gut-Hing	Sarawak	22 ft 5 1/2 in (6.85 m)	
19	Leroy Lucas	British Honduras	21 ft 9 1/2 in (6.64 m)	
