= Paul Foreman =

Jamaican long jumper (1939–2020)

Paul Foreman (25 January 1939 – 15 December 2020) was a Jamaican long jumper who competed in the 1960 Summer Olympics. He was the gold medallist in that event at the 1958 British Empire and Commonwealth Games. Born in Kingston, Jamaica, He was twice a winner at the British West Indies Championships (1957 and 1960) and also won a triple jump at the former event.

Foreman competed for the Illinois Fighting Illini track and field team in the United States, finishing 4th in the long jump and triple jump at the 1952 NCAA Division I Outdoor Track and Field Championships.
