= Ronnie Thomson =

Scottish rugby player and athlete

- Born: 12 October 1936 (age 90) Finchley, London, England
- School: University College School
- University: University of Cambridge

Rugby union career
- Position: Wing
International career
Years	Team	Apps	(Points)
1960–64	Scotland	15	(9)

Ronald Hew Thomson (born 12 October 1936) is a Scottish former international rugby union player and a former track and field athlete from Scotland who competed at the 1958 British Empire and Commonwealth Games (now Commonwealth Games).

== Biography ==
Thomson was born in Finchley and raised in London and attended University College School. He studied at the University of Cambridge, choosing athletics rather than rugby as his varsity sport. In 1958, Thomson was the inter-varsity 440-yards champion.

He represented the Scottish Empire and Commonwealth Games team at the 1958 British Empire Games in Cardiff, Wales, participating in two events, the 440 yards race and the 4 × 440 yards relay, with John MacIsaac, Jim Paterson and Donnie McDonald.

Thomson played rugby as a wing three-quarter and after a stint with UCS Old Boys joined London Scottish, from where he gained his Scotland call up in 1960. His try on debut helped Scotland defeat Ireland at Lansdowne Road for the first time in 27 years and he finished with 15 caps for the country. He scored the last minute try which won Scotland a 1963 Five Nations match in Paris, where he was based for the latter part of his international career. Although working in Geneva, Thomson would travel to Paris and play for Paris Université Club on weekends.

An entrepreneur, Thomson is a former Philip Morris International executive.

== See also ==
- List of Scotland national rugby union players
