= Jim Hamilton (runner) =

Scottish athlete

Personal information
- Nationality: British (Scottish)

Sport
- Sport: Athletics
- Event: Middle-distance
- Club: Victoria Park AAC, Glasgow

James S. Hamilton was a track and field athlete from Scotland who competed at the 1954 British Empire and Commonwealth Games (now Commonwealth Games).

== Biography ==
Hamilton began running just after World War II and as a junior won the 1946 SAAA 880 yards junior champion.

He ran for Victoria Park AAC in Glasgow and was the Scottish 440 yards champion. However, in 1950 he was living in Canada and decided that if he was not picked to represent Scotland at the forthcoming Empire Games, that he would run for Canada.

Subsequently, he was selected to represent the Scottish Empire and Commonwealth Games team at the 1954 British Empire Games in Vancouver, Canada, participating in one event, the 880 yards, where he reached the final.

At some time later in his life he returned home to live in Milngavie in Glasgow.
