= Peter Phillips (runner) =

Welsh athlete

Personal information
- Nationality: British (Welsh)

Sport
- Sport: Athletics
- Event: middle-distance
- Club: Polytechnic Harriers; London University; Rhondda AC

Peter John Phillips is a former Welsh athlete who specialised in the middle-distance events and appeared at the Commonwealth Games.

== Biography ==
In May 1954, Phillips was named as a possible for the 1954 British Empire and Commonwealth Games in Vancouver, Canada. Living at 'Brooklyn' Matexa Street in Ton Pentre at the time, he was studying Estate Management at the University of London.

He was educated at Rhondda County Grammar School and in 1950, won the Rhondda, Glamorgan and Welsh Schools AAA Junior Championships. Additionally he finished runner-up in the British Junior AAA Championship. He made the final of the 1953 AAA Championships and ran for the Polytechnic Harriers in their British relay win. He was the 1954 Welsh 440 yards champion.

After competing in the Maindy meeting he was duly selected for the Welsh athletics team for the 1954 British Empire and Commonwealth Games. He participated in the 440 yards and the 880 yards event.

After the Games he represented Rhondda AC.
