= Malcolm Spence (Jamaican athlete) =

Jamaican sprinter

Personal information
- Full name: Malcolm Emanuel Augustus Spence
- Nickname: Mal
- Born: 2 January 1936 Kingston, Jamaica
- Died: 30 October 2017 (aged 81) Boca Raton, Florida
- Height: 1.77 m (5 ft 10 in)
- Weight: 71 kg (157 lb)
Medal record
Men's athletics
Representing British West Indies
Olympic Games
Bronze medal – third place	1960 Rome	4×400 metres relay
Pan American Games
Gold medal – first place	1959 Chicago	4×400 m
Bronze medal – third place	1959 Chicago	400 m
Representing Jamaica
Commonwealth Games
Gold medal – first place	1962 Perth	4×440 yards
Bronze medal – third place	1958 Cardiff	4×440 yards
Central American and Caribbean Games
Gold medal – first place	1962 Kingston	4×400 m
Bronze medal – third place	1962 Kingston	400 metres

Malcolm A. E. Spence (2 January 1936 – 30 October 2017) was a Jamaican athlete who mainly competed in the 400 metres. His twin brother Melville also competed in track and field.

Spence competed for the British West Indies in the 1960 Summer Olympics held in Rome, Italy, where he won the bronze medal in the men's 4×400 metres relay with his teammates James Wedderburn, Keith Gardner and George Kerr. Curiously, there were two people named Malcolm Spence running the 400 meters distance at both the 1956 and the 1960 Olympics, both getting a bronze medal in 1960. Malcolm Spence from South Africa took the bronze medal in the Open race, while the South African relay team finished in fourth, one second behind Mal Spence's British West Indian relay team. Both twins returned to run the 4×400 relay in 1964 as members of the first independent Jamaican team.

Living in Florida, he served as a torchbearer for the 1996 Olympics in nearby Atlanta.

Both Mal and his twin brother were recruited to run for Arizona State University during the civil rights movement of the late 1950s, among the first international athletes to come to the US for athletics.

He is the author of The Lives and Times of Mal and Mel: Three Times Jamaican Olympians published in 2011.

== International competitions ==
Year	Competition	Venue	Position	Event	Notes
Representing Jamaica
1956	Olympic Games^{1}	Melbourne, Australia	15th (h)	200 m	21.86
1956	Olympic Games^{1}	Melbourne, Australia	9th (sf)	400 m	47.52
1956	Olympic Games^{1}	Melbourne, Australia	8th (h)	4 × 400 m relay	3:11.0^{1}
1957	British West Indies Championships	Kingston, Jamaica	1st	400 m	47.3
1957	British West Indies Championships	Kingston, Jamaica	1st	4 × 400 m relay	3:14.0
1958	British Empire and Commonwealth Games	Cardiff, United Kingdom	16th (sf)	440 y	48.4
1958	British Empire and Commonwealth Games	Cardiff, United Kingdom	3rd	4 × 440 y relay	3:10.08
1959	British West Indies Championships	Georgetown, British Guiana	2nd	400 m	
1959	British West Indies Championships	Georgetown, British Guiana	1st	4 × 400 m relay	3:09.5
1959	Pan American Games^{2}	Chicago, United States	3rd	400 m	46.6
1959	Pan American Games^{2}	Chicago, United States	1st	4 × 400 m relay	3:05.3
1960	British West Indies Championships	Kingston, Jamaica	1st	400 m	46.7
1960	Olympic Games^{2}	Rome, Italy	10th (sf)	400 m	46.99
1960	Olympic Games^{2}	Rome, Italy	3rd	4 × 400 m relay	3:04.13
1962	Central American and Caribbean Games	Kingston, Jamaica	3rd	400 m	47.4
1962	Central American and Caribbean Games	Kingston, Jamaica	1st	4 × 400 m relay	3:11.6
1962	British Empire and Commonwealth Games	Perth, Australia	5th	440 y	47.7
1962	British Empire and Commonwealth Games	Perth, Australia	1st	4 × 440 y relay	3:10.2
1963	Pan American Games	São Paulo, Brazil	3rd	4 × 400 m relay	3:12.61
1964	British West Indies Championships	Kingston, Jamaica	2nd	400 m	48.2
1964	Olympic Games	Tokyo, Japan	4th	4 × 400 m relay	3:02.3
1966	Central American and Caribbean Games	San Juan, Puerto Rico	9th (sf)	400 m	49.4
1966	British Empire and Commonwealth Games	Kingston, Jamaica	22nd (h)	440 y	48.7

^{1}Disqualified in the final
^{2}Representing British West Indies
