= Barry Robinson (sprinter) =

New Zealand architect

Personal information
- Born: Barry Clyde Robinson; 8 March 1937 (age 89) Auckland, New Zealand
- Height: 1.87 m (6 ft 2 in)
- Weight: 76 kg (168 lb)
- Spouse: Jill Elizabeth White (m. 1962)

Sport
- Country: New Zealand
- Sport: Athletics

Achievements and titles
- National finals: 220 yd hurdles champion (1957); 440 yd champion (1958, 1959, 1960, 1962)
- Personal bests: 200 m – 21.2 s 400 m – 46.9 s

Barry Clyde Robinson (born 8 March 1937) is a former New Zealand athlete and architect, who represented his country at one Olympic and two Commonwealth Games.

== Early life and family ==
Born in Auckland on 8 March 1937, Robinson was educated at Auckland Grammar School. He then studied at Auckland University College, graduating Bachelor of Architecture with distinction in 1962. He was later awarded a Diploma of Valuation by the University of Auckland in 1974.

In 1962 Robinson married Jill Elizabeth White, and the couple went on to have three children.

== Athletics ==
As a junior, Robinson won national athletics titles under-19 120 yards hurdles and under-19 long jump in 1956. He went on to win senior titles in the 220 yards hurdles in 1957, and the 440 yards in 1958, 1959, 1960 and 1962.

Robinson was a New Zealand Universities athletics representative between 1955 and 1960, captaining the team in 1960 when they visited Australia. He represented New Zealand at the 1958 British Empire and Commonwealth Games in the 440 yards, but did not progress beyond the quarter-finals. At the 1960 Summer Olympics in Rome, Robinson competed in both the men's 200 m and 400 m events, being eliminated in the first round of the 200 m and reaching the quarter-finals of the 400 m. At the 1962 British Empire and Commonwealth Games, he reached the semi-finals of the 440 yards, and was eliminated in the heats of the men's 4 x 440 yards relay (running with Dave Norris, Peter Snell and Gary Philpott).

== Career ==
Between 1962 and 1964 Robinson practised as an architect in Australia, before returning to Auckland where he was an architect for the Auckland City Council. From 1977 to 1987 he was a director of the Auckland Building Society.
