= George Kerr (runner) =

Jamaican athlete (1937–2012)

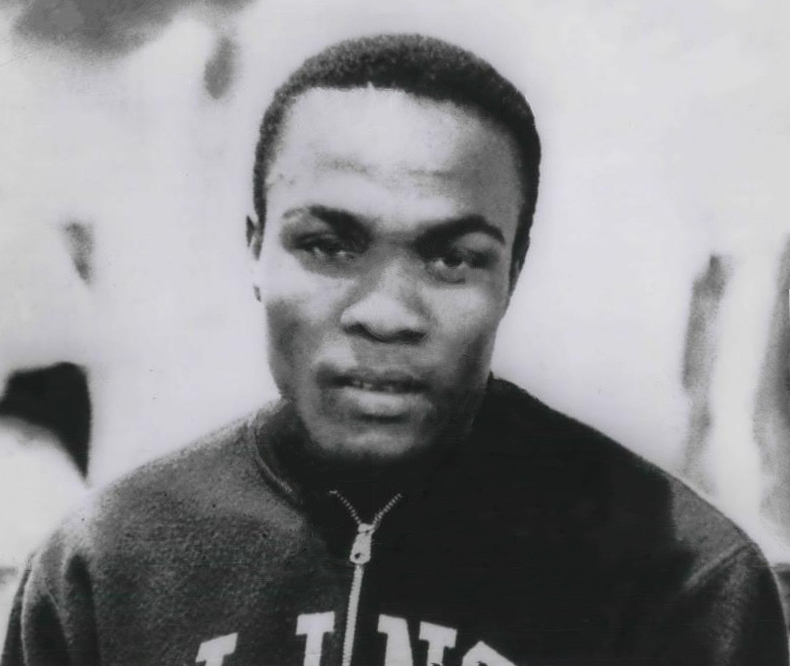
- Kerr in 1961

Personal information
- Born: 16 October 1937 Hanover Parish, Jamaica
- Died: 15 June 2012 (aged 74) Kingston, Jamaica
- Height: 180 cm (5 ft 11 in)
- Weight: 70 kg (154 lb)

Sport
- Sport: Athletics
- Events: 400 m, 800 m
- Club: Knockalva Agricultural School, Hanover, Jamaica; University of Illinois, Champaign (USA)

Achievements and titles
- Personal bests: 400 – 45.7y (1960); 800 m – 1:45.8y (1964)
Medal record
Representing British West Indies
Olympic Games
Bronze medal – third place	1960 Rome	4×400 m relay
Bronze medal – third place	1960 Rome	800 metres
Pan American Games
Gold medal – first place	1959 Chicago	400 metres
Gold medal – first place	1959 Chicago	4×400 m relay
Silver medal – second place	1959 Chicago	800 metres
Representing Jamaica
Commonwealth Games
Gold medal – first place	1962 Perth	440 yards
Gold medal – first place	1962 Perth	4×440 yd relay
Silver medal – second place	1962 Perth	880 yards
Bronze medal – third place	1958 Cardiff	4×440 yd relay
Bronze medal – third place	1966 Kingston	880 yards
Central American and Caribbean Games
Gold medal – first place	1962 Kingston	400 metres
Gold medal – first place	1962 Kingston	800 metres
Gold medal – first place	1962 Kingston	4×400 m relay

George Ezekiel Kerr (16 October 1937 – 15 June 2012) was a Jamaican athlete who competed in the 400 and 800 metres. He competed for the British West Indies at the 1960 Summer Olympics, where he won the bronze medal in the 800 metres. He then teamed up with Keith Gardner, Malcolm Spence and James Wedderburn to win the bronze medal in the 4×400 metres relay.

In 1962, he became the first Jamaican athlete to have the national flag flown in recognition of winning a gold when he won double gold in the 400 m and 800 m at the Central American and Caribbean Games held at Kingston's National Stadium. At the 1964 Olympics, representing Jamaica, he finished fourth both in the 800 m and the 4 × 400 m relay. He broke the Olympic record for the 800 m in the semi-finals but lost the bronze by less than one-tenth of a second with 1:45.9, his fastest ever time.

Kerr won five medals at three Commonwealth Games. In 1958 he won a bronze in the 4 × 440 yards relay. He won gold medals in the 440 yards and in the 4 × 440 yards relay and silver in the 880 yards in 1962. His final medal, a bronze for the 880 yards, came in 1966 in Kingston, Jamaica.

Kerr won the British AAA Championships title in the 880 yards event at the 1961 AAA Championships.

On 4 June 2012, Kerr had a heart attack and underwent heart surgery at the University Hospital of the West Indies. He remained in the intensive care unit until he succumbed to complications. He had a wife, Fay Kerr, five children, Karyn, Margaret, Roger, Candice and William and seven grandchildren.

== International competitions ==
Year	Competition	Venue	Position	Event	Notes
Representing Jamaica
1956	Olympic Games	Melbourne, Australia	14th (qf)	400 m	47.79
1956	Olympic Games	Melbourne, Australia	8th (h)	4 × 400 m relay	3:11.0^{1}
1957	British West Indies Championships	Kingston, Jamaica	3rd	400 m	47.7
1957	British West Indies Championships	Kingston, Jamaica	1st	800 m	1:50.5
1957	British West Indies Championships	Kingston, Jamaica	1st	4 × 400 m relay	3:14.0
1958	British Empire and Commonwealth Games	Cardiff, United Kingdom	10th (sf)	440 y	48.4
1958	British Empire and Commonwealth Games	Cardiff, United Kingdom	3rd	4 × 440 y relay	3:10.08
1959	British West Indies Championships	Georgetown, British Guiana	1st	400 m	46.8
1959	British West Indies Championships	Georgetown, British Guiana	1st	800 m	1:53.6
1959	British West Indies Championships	Georgetown, British Guiana	1st	4 × 400 m relay	3:09.5
1959	Pan American Games^{2}	Chicago, United States	1st	400 m	46.1
1959	Pan American Games^{2}	Chicago, United States	2nd	800 m	1:49.4
1959	Pan American Games^{2}	Chicago, United States	1st	4 × 400 m relay	3:05.3
1960	British West Indies Championships	Kingston, Jamaica	2nd	400 m	46.8
1960	British West Indies Championships	Kingston, Jamaica	1st	800 m	1:49.8
1960	Olympic Games^{2}	Tokyo, Japan	3rd	800 m	1:47.25
1960	Olympic Games^{2}	Tokyo, Japan	3rd	4 × 400 m relay	3:04.13
1962	Central American and Caribbean Games	Kingston, Jamaica	1st	400 m	45.9
1962	Central American and Caribbean Games	Kingston, Jamaica	1st	800 m	1:51.0
1962	Central American and Caribbean Games	Kingston, Jamaica	1st	4 × 400 m relay	3:11.6
1962	British Empire and Commonwealth Games	Perth, Australia	1st	440 y	46.7
1962	British Empire and Commonwealth Games	Perth, Australia	2nd	880 y	1:47.8
1962	British Empire and Commonwealth Games	Perth, Australia	1st	4 × 440 y relay	3:10.2
1964	British West Indies Championships	Kingston, Jamaica	1st	1500 m	3:52.6
1964	Olympic Games	Tokyo, Japan	4th	800 m	1:45.9
1964	Olympic Games	Tokyo, Japan	4th	4 × 400 m relay	3:02.3
1965	British West Indies Championships	Bridgetown, Barbados	3rd	5000 m	16:00.8
1966	Central American and Caribbean Games	San Juan, Puerto Rico	1st (h)	800 m	1:53.0^{3}
1966	Central American and Caribbean Games	San Juan, Puerto Rico	7th	5000 m	NT
1966	British Empire and Commonwealth Games	Kingston, Jamaica	3rd	880 y	1:47.2
1966	British Empire and Commonwealth Games	Kingston, Jamaica	4th	4 × 440 y relay	3:06.8

^{1}Disqualified in the final
^{2}Representing British West Indies
^{3}Did not finish in the final
