= Jerome Walters =

American middle-distance runner

- Born: 9 April 1930
- Died: 5 March 1998 (aged 67)
- Citizenship: United States
- Known for: Middle-distance runner during the 1956 Summer Olympics

Jerome Walters (9 April 1930 – 5 March 1998) was an American middle distance runner who competed in the 1956 Summer Olympics.
