= Alan Dick =

British sprinter (1930–2002)

Personal information
- Nationality: British (English)
- Born: 15 April 1930 Sunderland, England
- Died: 5 January 2002 (aged 71)
- Height: 185 cm (6 ft 1 in)
- Weight: 73 kg (161 lb)

Sport
- Sport: Sprinting
- Event: 400 metres
- Club: Achilles Club
Medal record
Athletics
Representing England
British Empire and Commonwealth Games
| Gold medal – first place | 1954 Vancouver | 4 x 440 Relay |

Alan Dick (15 April 1930 – 5 January 2002) was a British sprinter who competed at the 1952 Summer Olympics.

== Biography ==
At the 1952 Olympic Games in Helsinki, he competed men's 400 metres event.

He also represented England and participated in the 440 yards event at the 1954 British Empire and Commonwealth Games in Vancouver, Canada.

He also won the gold medal in the 4 x 440 yards event with Peter Higgins, Peter Fryer and Derek Johnson.
