= John Asare-Antwi =

Ghanaian sprinter (born 1935)

Personal information
- Nationality: Ghanaian
- Born: 28 November 1935 (age 90) Begoro, Ghana

Sport
- Sport: Sprinting
- Event: 400 metres
Medal record
Men's Athletics
Representing Ghana
Commonwealth Games
Bronze medal – third place	1962 Perth	4 × 440 yards relay

John Asare-Antwi (born 28 November 1935) is a Ghanaian sprinter. He competed in the men's 400 metres at the 1960 Summer Olympics.
