= Michael Ahey =

Ghanaian former sprinter and long jumper

Medal record

Men's athletics

Representing Ghana

British Empire and Commonwealth Games
Gold medal – first place	1962 Perth	Long jump
Silver medal – second place	1962 Perth	4 × 110 yd relay

British Commonwealth Games
Gold medal – first place	1970 Edinburgh	4 x 100 m relay

Michael Kofi Ahey (born 22 November 1939) is a Ghanaian former sprinter and long jumper who competed in the 1964 Summer Olympics, in the 1968 Summer Olympics, and in the 1972 Summer Olympics.
