= Abdul Rahim Ahmad =

Malaysian sprinter

Personal information
- Nationality: Malaysian
- Born: 6 June 1933 (age 92)

Sport
- Sport: Sprinting
- Event: 400 metres

Abdul Rahim bin Ahmad (born 9 June 1933) is a Malaysian sprinter. He competed in the men's 400 metres at the 1956 Summer Olympics.
