= Malcolm Spence (South African athlete) =

South African sprinter

Personal information
- Nationality: South African
- Born: 4 September 1937 Johannesburg, South Africa
- Died: 30 December 2010 (aged 73) Howick, South Africa
- Height: 187 cm (6 ft 2 in)
- Weight: 76 kg (168 lb)

Sport
- Sport: Athletics
- Event: 400m
Medal record
Men's athletics
Representing South Africa
Olympic Games
Bronze medal – third place	1960 Rome	400 metres
British Empire and Commonwealth Games
Silver medal – second place	1958 Cardiff	440 yards
Gold medal – first place	1958 Cardiff	4×440 yards relay

Malcolm Clive Spence (4 September 1937 – 30 December 2010) was a South African athlete who competed at two Olympic Games.

== Biography ==
Spence ran for South Africa in the 1956 Summer Olympics held in Melbourne, Australia, finishing sixth in the 400 metres.

Spence finished second behind John Salisbury in the 440 yards event at the British 1958 AAA Championships. Shortly afterwards at the 1958 British Empire and Commonwealth Games in Cardiff, Wales, he won silver in the individual event and was part of the team that won gold in the relay. The latter was won with teammates Gordon Day, Gerald Evans and Gert Potgieter.

He also represented his country in the 400 metres in the 1960 Summer Olympics held in Rome, Italy, where he won the bronze medal. Curiously, there were two people named Malcolm Spence running the 400 meters distance at the 1960 Olympics, both getting a bronze medal. Malcolm Spence from Jamaica was unable to get out of the semi-final round in the Open race. But the Jamaican, who shortened his name to Mal Spence, led off his British West Indian relay team which finished a second ahead of the South African relay team anchored by this Malcolm Spence.

All sixteen of Malcolm Spence's great, great-grandparents emigrated to South Africa from Kent, England.
