= Brobbey Mensah =

Ghanaian sprinter (born 1934)

Personal information
- Full name: Owusu Mensah
- Nationality: Ghanaian
- Born: 25 December 1934 (age 91)

Sport
- Sport: Sprinting
- Event: 4 × 400 metres relay

Owusu "Brobbey" Mensah (born 25 December 1934) is a Ghanaian sprinter. He competed in the men's 4 × 400 metres relay at the 1964 Summer Olympics.
