= 1955 Summer International University Sports Week =

Multi-sport event in San Sebastián, Spain

- Host city: San Sebastián, Spain
- Nations: 24
- Events: 20 sports
- Opening: August 7, 1955
- Closing: August 14, 1955
- Opened by: Francisco Franco

The 1955 Summer International University Sports Week were organised by the International University Sports Federation (FISU) and held in San Sebastián, Spain, between 7 and 14 August.

== Sports ==
- Athletics
- Basketball
- Diving
- Fencing
- Field hockey
- Football
- Swimming
- Tennis
- Volleyball
- Water polo
