= Basil Ince =

Trinidadian sprinter and politician (1933–2026)

Personal information
- Born: Basil Ince; 1 May 1933
- Died: 15 October 2026 (aged 93)
Medal record
Men's athletics
Representing British West Indies
Pan American Games
Gold medal – first place	1959 Chicago	4×400 m
Silver medal – second place	1959 Chicago	400 m

Basil André Ince (1 May 1933 – 15 October 2026) was a Trinidadian sprinter, academic and politician.

== Sports career ==
At the 1958 British Empire and Commonwealth Games, Ince represented Trinidad and Tobago in the 440 yards relay, the 440 yards and the 220 yards. He was most successful in the 440 yards, where he came second in his heat before narrowly missing out on moving beyond the quarterfinals.

The following year, Ince represented the British West Indies at the 1959 Pan American Games, participating in the 200 metres, 400 metres, and 4x400 metres relay. He won silver in the 400 metres, and took gold as part of the successful relay team.

Ince competed for the Tufts Jumbos track and field team in the NCAA.

== Academic career ==
Ince began studying History and Political Science at Tufts University in 1956, and then completed a master's degree and PhD at New York University in the 1960s. He later worked in academia including as a Senior Lecturer in International Relations at the University of the West Indies for ten years.

== Political career ==
From 1981 to 1985, Ince was the Minister of External Affairs, and from 1985 to 1986, was the Minister of Sport, Culture and Youth Affairs. He also was a Senator during his time as a Minister, and was affiliated with the People's National Movement. He then served as High Commissioner to the United Kingdom.

== Death ==
Basîl Ince died on 15 October 2026, at the age of 93.
