= Peter Higgins (athlete) =

British sprinter (1928–1993)

Personal information
- Nationality: British (English)
- Born: 16 November 1928 Stockton-on-Tees, England
- Died: 8 September 1993 (aged 64)
- Height: 179 cm (5 ft 10 in)
- Weight: 67 kg (148 lb)

Sport
- Sport: Athletics
- Event: 400m
- Club: Northern Counties; Southgate Harriers
Medal record
Athletics
Representing Great Britain
Olympic Games
Bronze medal – third place	1956 Melbourne	4x400m relay
Representing England
British Empire & Commonwealth Games
Gold medal – first place	1954 Vancouver	4x440y relay

Francis Peter Higgins (16 November 1928 – 8 September 1993) was a British athlete who mainly competed in the 400 metres, who competed at the 1956 Summer Olympics.

== Biography ==
Higgins finished third behind Peter Fryer in the 440 yards event at the 1954 AAA Championships. Shortly afterwards he represented the England team at the 1954 British Empire and Commonwealth Games in Vancouver, where he won a gold medal in the 4 x 440 yards event with Peter Fryer, Alan Dick and Derek Johnson.

Higgins was third again behind Fryer at the 1955 AAA Championships, improving to second behind Michael Wheeler at the 1956 AAA Championships.

Later that year in 1956 he represented Great Britain at the 1956 Olympic Games in Melbourne, Australia, where he won the bronze medal in the 4 x 400 metre relay with his team mates Michael Wheeler, John Salisbury and Derek Johnson.

Higgins finally became the British 440 yards champion after winning the British AAA Championships title at the 1957 AAA Championships.
