= Dave Norris (athlete) =

New Zealand athlete (born 1939)

Dave Norris ONZM
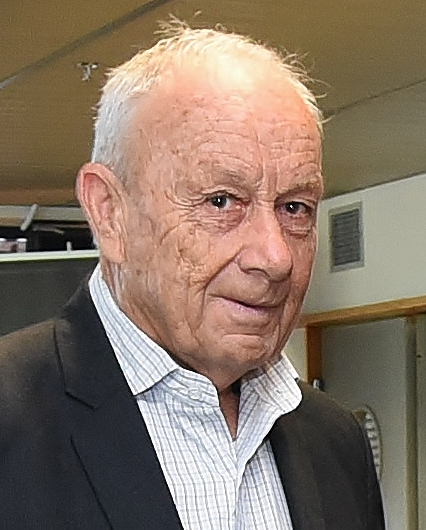
- Norris in 2017

Personal information
- Full name: David Stanley Norris
- Born: 14 December 1939 (age 86) Birkenhead, New Zealand

Sport
- Country: New Zealand
- Sport: Athletics
- Events: Triple jump; long jump

Achievements and titles
- National finals: 220 yd champion (1961, 1962); Long jump champion (1960, 1961, 1963, 1964, 1966, 1968, 1970, 1971); Triple jump champion (1957, 1958, 1959, 1960, 1961, 1962, 1963, 1964, 1965, 1966, 1967, 1968, 1969, 1970, 1971, 1974, 1975, 1977)
Medal record
Men's athletics
Representing New Zealand
British Empire and Commonwealth Games
Silver medal – second place	1962 Perth	Long jump
Bronze medal – third place	1958 Cardiff	Triple jump

David Stanley Norris ONZM (born 14 December 1939) is a former New Zealand athlete who specialised in the long jump and triple jump.

== Biography ==
Norris became New Zealand national champion in the triple jump at the age of 17 years-old in 1957, becoming the youngest New Zealand male national champion in an athletics event, a record that stood until beaten by a 15 year-old Sam Ruthe in 2025.

Norris competed at five British Empire and Commonwealth Games from 1958 to 1974. At the 1962 British Empire and Commonwealth Games he won the silver medal in the men's long jump. At the 1958 British Empire and Commonwealth Games in Cardiff he had won the bronze medal in the triple jump. At the 1960 Summer Olympics he competed in both the long jump and triple jump. Norris won a total of 28 national titles and broke 11 records in jumping and hurdling events over his career.

Norris also won the British AAA Championships title at the 1958 AAA Championships.

Norris also played 31 games of basketball for New Zealand. He was later the chief executive of North Harbour Basketball in Auckland.

After retiring from competitive athletics in 1978, Norris worked as a coach. He spent most of his working life as a school teacher in the Auckland area, teaching at Avondale College, Waiuku College and Kelston Boys' High School, before becoming deputy principal at Rangitoto College and then principal of Glenfield College.

Norris was part of a dedicated team who, led by Sir Graeme Avery, created the Millennium Institute of Sport and Health on Auckland's North Shore. He managed the New Zealand team at the 1996 Atlanta Olympics. In the 2002 Queen's Birthday and Golden Jubilee Honours, Norris was appointed an Officer of the New Zealand Order of Merit, for services to athletics and the community.
