= Ebenezer Quartey =

Ghanaian sprinter (born 1934)

Personal information
- Nationality: Ghanaian
- Born: 25 August 1934 (age 91)

Sport
- Sport: Sprinting
- Event: 400 metres

Ebenezer Quartey (born 25 August 1934) is a Ghanaian sprinter. He competed in the men's 400 metres at the 1964 Summer Olympics.
