= Sim Sang-ok =

South Korean middle-distance runner

Personal information
- Nationality: South Korean
- Born: 16 September 1933 (age 92)

Sport
- Sport: Middle-distance running
- Event: 800 metres

Sim Sang-ok (born 16 September 1933) is a South Korean middle-distance runner. He competed in the men's 800 metres at the 1956 Summer Olympics.
