= Peter Fryer (athlete) =

English sprinter

Personal information
- Nationality: British (English)
- Born: 2 July 1928 Peterborough, England
- Died: 20 December 1999 (aged 71) Northamptonshire, England

Sport
- Sport: Athletics
- Event: 440y/400m
- Club: London Athletic Club
Medal record
Athletics
Representing England
British Empire & Commonwealth Games
Gold medal – first place	1954 Vancouver	4 x 440y yards

Peter Goodwin Fryer (1928-1999), was a male athlete who competed for England.

== Biography ==
Fryer became the British 440 yards champion after winning the British AAA Championships title at the 1953 AAA Championships.

Shortly after retaining his AAA title at the 1954 AAA Championships, Fryer represented England at the 1954 British Empire and Commonwealth Games in Vancouver, Canada. He won gold medal in the 4 x 440 yards event with Peter Higgins, Alan Dick and Derek Johnson.

Fryer won a third consecutive AAA title at the 1955 AAA Championships.
