= Gianfranco Fantuzzi =

Italian engineer

- Born: 6 November 1959 (age 66); Modena, Italy
- Citizenship: Italian
- Occupation: Engineer
- Years active: 1976 - 2019
- Employer(s): Scuderia Toro Rosso, Toyota Racing, Minardi, Scuderia Ferrari

Gianfranco Fantuzzi (born 6 November 1959) is a retired Italian Formula One and motorsport engineer and former mechanic. He is best known for his long tenure with Scuderia Toro Rosso as Team Manager, as well as his earlier career with Scuderia Ferrari, Minardi and Toyota Racing.

== Career ==
Fantuzzi began his motorsport career at the age of 17 as a mechanic with Scuderia Ferrari in 1976. He later progressed into the team's research and development department as an R&D technician, where he developed his technical skills as an engineer. He subsequently worked as a race engineer for Jean Alesi during the 1991 season and Ivan Capelli in 1992, before working with Gerhard Berger during the early part of the 1993 season, prior to being replaced by Luigi Mazzola. Fantuzzi then moved to the United States, becoming Ferrari's service manager in San Francisco, before later returning to Formula One to rejoin Ferrari's R&D department.

In 1998, Fantuzzi joined Minardi as a race engineer, working with Luca Badoer in 1999 and Gastón Mazzacane in 2000. He then moved to Toyota Racing in 2001 as logistics manager, overseeing freight and transport and during Toyota's early Formula One campaigns. Fantuzzi rejoined the Faenza team, now called Scuderia Toro Rosso in 2006 as general manager and progressed to team manager in 2009. In these roles, he was responsible for trackside operations, team logistics and coordination across the Faenza-based team's Formula One programme. From 2013 onwards transitioned into infrastructure and special projects roles within Toro Rosso, departing the team at the end of 2019.
