= Bartonjo Rotich =

Kenyan sprinter and hurdler (1938–2019)

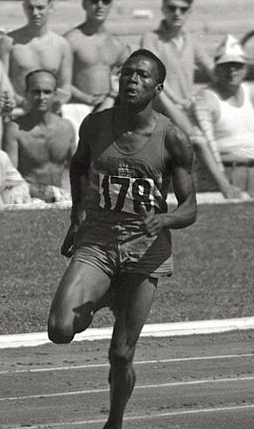
- Bartonjo Rotich at the 1960 Olympics

Personal information
- Born: 25 May 1938 Baringo District, Kenya
- Died: 30 September 2019 (aged 81)
- Height: 1.65 m (5 ft 5 in)
- Weight: 63 kg (139 lb)

Sport
- Sport: Athletics
- Events: 400 m, 400 m hurdles

Achievements and titles
- Personal bests: 400 m – 47.0y (1960); 400 mH – 51.39 (1960)
Medal record
Representing Kenya
British Empire and Commonwealth Games
Bronze medal – third place	1958 Cardiff	440 yard hurdles

Bartonjo Rotich (25 May 1938 – 30 September 2019) was a runner from Kenya who specialised in 400 metres and 400 metres hurdles.

He went to Alliance High School. Rotich competed at the 1956 Summer Olympics, but failed to advance past 400 metres heats and 4x400 metres relay heats.

At the 1958 British Empire and Commonwealth Games, he finished third in the 440 yards hurdles race. By this result he became the first Kenyan athlete to win a medal at any intercontinental championships alongside Arere Anentia, who won bronze medal over 6 miles race. He competed at the 1960 Summer Olympics and he reached 400 metres hurdles semifinals and 400 metres quarterfinals.

He was the chairman of Athletics Kenya from 1968 to 1972.
