= Richard Estick =

Jamaican sprinter (born 1934)

Personal information
- Nationality: Jamaican
- Born: 15 July 1934 (age 92)

Sport
- Sport: Sprinting
- Event: 200 metres

Richard Clement Estick (born 15 July 1934) is a Jamaican sprinter. He competed in the men's 200 metres at the 1956 Summer Olympics. Estick finished sixth in the 1954 British Empire and Commonwealth Games 4×440 yards relay (with Keith Gardner, Les Laing, and the non-Olympian Louis Gooden). In the 1954 British Empire and Commonwealth Games 440 yards as well as in the 880 yards he was eliminated in the heats.
