= Shigeharu Suzuki =

Japanese sprinter (1934–2012)

Personal information
- Nationality: Japanese
- Born: 5 April 1934
- Died: 27 February 2012 (aged 77) Fuchu, Tokyo

Sport
- Sport: Sprinting
- Events: 800 meters, 4 × 400 metres relay

Shigeharu Suzuki (鈴木 重晴, Suzuki Shigeharu; 5 April 1934 – 27 February 2012) was a Japanese sprinter. He competed in the men's 800 metres and the men's 4 × 400 metres relay events at the 1956 Summer Olympics. He served as the coach for the Waseda University track and field team for 19 years starting in 1984.
