= Jim Paterson (athlete) =

Scottish athlete (1934–2012)

Personal information
- Nationality: British (Scottish)
- Born: 29 March 1934 Edinburgh, Scotland
- Died: 24 June 2012 (aged 78) Drumnadrochit, Scotland

Sport
- Sport: Athletics
- Event(s): 440y, Middle-distance
- Club: Edinburgh University AC

James Veitch Paterson (29 March 1934 – 24 June 2012) was a Scottish track and field athlete who competed at the 1958 British Empire and Commonwealth Games (now Commonwealth Games).

== Biography ==
Paterson was born in Edinburgh on 29 March 1934. He studied at the University of Edinburgh and was a member of their athletics team. Paterson was the Scottish two miles steeplechase champion in 1953 and won the Scottish half-mile title at the 1956 SAAA Championships.

In 1957 he won both the 440 and 880 yards titles at the S.A.A.A Championships and in February 1958 he was named by the Scottish AAA in the 'possibles list' for the forthcoming Commonwealth and Empire Games.

At the 1958 Scottish A.A.A. Championships, he finished runner-up to Donald MacDonald in the half-mile but defeated the same athlete in the 440 yards.

He represented the Scottish Empire and Commonwealth Games team at the 1958 British Empire Games in Cardiff, Wales, participating in three events, the 440 yards race, the 880 yards and the 4 × 440 yards relay, with John MacIsaac, Ronnie Thomson and Donald MacDonald.

Paterson died in Drumnadrochit on 24 June 2012, at the age of 78.
