= David Law (athlete) =

British athlete (1930–2011)

Personal information
- Nationality: British (English)
- Born: 9 September 1930 Sheffield, England
- Died: 17 May 2011 (aged 80)

Sport
- Sport: Athletics
- Event: Middle-distance
- Club: Hallamshire Harriers; Oxford University AC; Achilles Club

David Charles Law (9 September 1930 – 17 May 2011) was an English athlete.

== Biography ==
David Charles Law was born in Sheffield, England on 9 September 1930. He was educated at King Edward VII School, Sheffield and Brasenose College, Oxford.

He finished third behind Bill Nankeville in the 1 mile event at the 1952 AAA Championships and third behind Roger Bannister at the 1954 AAA Championships.

Law represented England in the 880 yards and 1 mile at the 1954 British Empire and Commonwealth Games in Vancouver, Canada.

Law died on 17 May 2011, aged 80.
