= John Wrighton =

British athlete

Personal information
- Nationality: British (English)
- Born: 10 March 1933 (age 93) Ilford, England
- Height: 189 cm (6 ft 2 in)
- Weight: 80 kg (176 lb)

Sport
- Sport: Athletics
- Event: 400 m
- Club: Southgate Harriers
Medal record
Representing Great Britain
Men's athletics
European Championships
Gold medal – first place	1958 Stockholm	400 m
Gold medal – first place	1958 Stockholm	4 × 400 m relay
Representing England
British Empire & Commonwealth Games
Silver medal – second place	1958 Cardiff	4 × 440 y Relay

John Derek Wrighton MB, BS, FRCS (born 10 March 1933) is a retired track and field athlete who competed at the 1960 Summer Olympics.

== Biography ==
Wrighton finished third behind Peter Higgins in the 440 yards event at the 1957 AAA Championships.

He represented the England athletics team and won a silver medal in the 4 × 440 yards relay at the 1958 British Empire and Commonwealth Games in Cardiff, Wales. Shortly afterwards he won two gold medals at the 1958 European Championships in Stockholm, Sweden: in the men's individual 400 metres and in the 4 × 400 metres relay, alongside Ted Sampson, John MacIsaac, and John Salisbury. Known for both his pronounced lean when running and his erratic pacing, John Wrighton and John Salisbury marked the beginning of the renaissance of British quarter miling after the second World War.

Wrighton became the British 440 yards champion after winning the British AAA Championships title at the 1959 AAA Championships and then at the 1960 Olympic Games in Rome, he represented Great Britain in the 400 metres and 4 × 400 metres relay events.

== Personal life ==
From 1958, Wrighton served on a short-service commission with the Royal Navy, achieving the rank of Surgeon Lieutenant, after which he was placed on the emergency list and retired in May 1961. He then completed his medical training becoming FRCS in 1967 and made his home in Dorset where he worked for many years as an orthopaedic surgeon.

Wrighton was awarded an honorary Doctor of Science degree by the University of Bournemouth in 2007. Wrighton served on the board of the university for seven years.
