= Almut Brömmel =

German athlete

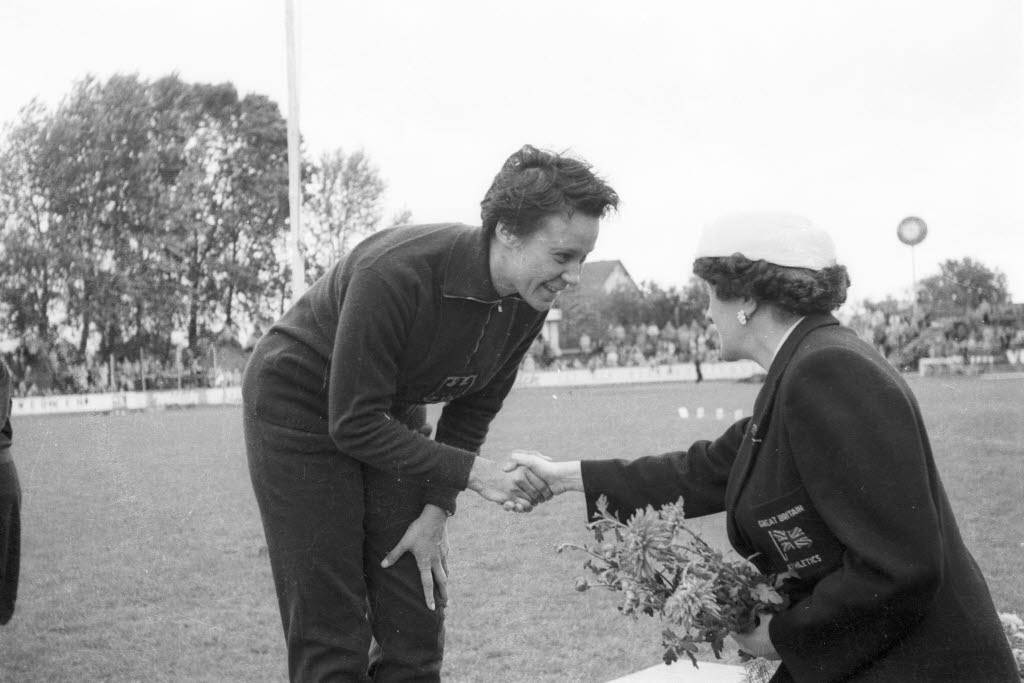
- Almut Brömmel (left) in 1957

Personal information
- Born: 5 May 1935 (age 91) Markranstädt, Saxony, West Germany

Sport
- Sport: Track and field
Medal record
Representing West Germany
World Student Games
Gold medal – first place	1955 San Sebastián	Discus throw
Gold medal – first place	1955 San Sebastián	Javelin throw
Gold medal – first place	1963 Porto Alegre	Javelin throw
Silver medal – second place	1955 San Sebastián	Shot put
Bronze medal – third place	1961 Sofia	Javelin throw

Almut Brömmel (born 5 May 1935) is a retired female javelin thrower and discus thrower from Germany, who represented her native country twice at the Summer Olympics: 1956 and 1960. She set her personal best (55.16 metres) in the women's javelin throw in 1968.

== International competitions ==
Year	Competition	Venue	Position	Notes
Representing West Germany
1956	Olympic Games	Melbourne, Australia	22nd	Discus
1956	Olympic Games	Melbourne, Australia	13th	Javelin
1960	Olympic Games	Rome, Italy	16th	Javelin
1963	World Student Games	Porto Alegre, Brazil	1st	Javelin
