= Gert Potgieter (athlete) =

Medal record

Men's Athletics

Representing South Africa

British Empire and Commonwealth Games
Gold medal – first place	1958 Cardiff	440 yards hurdles
Gold medal – first place	1958 Cardiff	4×440 yards relay

Gerhardus Cornelius Potgieter (born 16 April 1937 in Pietermaritzburg, Natal, South Africa) is a retired South African Track and field athletics competitor, primarily known for the 400-metre and 440-yard hurdles. His innovation was to run 14 steps between the hurdles (alternating legs at each). For perspective, 1980's legend Edwin Moses' innovation was to run 13 steps. Former world record holder Kevin Young was able to achieve 12 steps between some hurdles.

He did participate in the 1956 Summer Olympics at the age of 19 and was in third position until he fell over the final hurdle, ultimately finishing sixth.

In 1957 he ran the 440-yard hurdles in 50.7 at an event in Queenstown, Eastern Cape. Only two days later was the public informed that it was a new world record.

At the 1958 Commonwealth Games, he improved his record to 49.73. At 23 he, had achieved the world's best time in the event: 49.3, but on a single turn, oversized track which disqualified any official world record. Potgeiter was a favorite for the gold medal at the 1960 Summer Olympics, but was seriously injured in an automobile accident in Germany two weeks before, effectively ending his career at the age of 23. Despite a partial loss of sight, after years of physical therapy, he did manage to return to win the South African championship in the decathlon in 1966. After 1956's disappointment in Melbourne, he proceeded to hit the world record four times.

He married German Olympian Renate Junker in 1962. A guest of the wedding was politician Pik Botha, who had his car stolen during the wedding.
