= Urban Cleve =

German middle-distance runner

Personal information
- Nationality: German
- Born: 24 November 1930 (age 95) Dortmund, Germany

Sport
- Sport: Middle-distance running
- Event: 800 metres

Urban Cleve (born 24 November 1930) is a German middle-distance runner. He competed in the men's 800 metres at the 1952 Summer Olympics.
