= Frederick Owusu =

Ghanaian sprinter (born 1936)

Personal information
- Nationality: Ghanaian
- Born: 23 September 1936 (age 89)

Sport
- Sport: Sprinting
- Event: 4 × 400 metres relay

Frederick Akuffo Owusu (born 23 September 1936) is a Ghanaian sprinter. He competed in the men's 4 × 400 metres relay at the 1960 Summer Olympics.
