= Ted Sampson =

British athlete

Personal information
- Nationality: British (English)
- Born: 2 December 1935 (age 90)

Sport
- Sport: Athletics
- Event: 400m/440y
- Club: Blackheath Harriers
Medal record
Men's athletics
Representing Great Britain
European Championships
Gold medal – first place	1958 Stockholm	4×400 m
Representing England
British Empire & Commonwealth Games
Silver medal – second place	1958 Cardiff	4×440 yards

Edward John Sampson (born 2 December 1935), is a male former athlete who competed for England.

== Biography ==
Sampson was a member of the Blackheath Harriers.

He represented the England athletics team and won a silver medal in the 4 × 440 yard relay at the 1958 British Empire and Commonwealth Games in Cardiff, Wales. He obtained the English 440yards record in a heat of that event at Cardiff Arms Park on 22 July 1958, in a time of 46.8 seconds, and was the first British athlete to run below 47seconds for that event.

He missed out on a place for the 1960 Summer Olympics in Rome after a poor performance at the 1960 AAA Championships.
