= Terry Tobacco =

Canadian Olympic athlete (1936–2026)

Personal information
- Nationality: Canadian
- Born: Charles Terence Tobacco; March 2, 1936 Cumberland, British Columbia, Canada
- Died: March 2, 2026 (aged 90) Vancouver, British Columbia, Canada
- Height: 1.88 m (6 ft 2 in)
- Weight: 63 kg (139 lb)

Sport
- Country: Canada
- Sport: Athletics
- Club: Cumberland
Medal record
Men's Athletics
Representing Canada
British Empire and Commonwealth Games
Silver medal – second place	1954 Vancouver	4×440 yards relay
Bronze medal – third place	1954 Vancouver	440 yards
Bronze medal – third place	1958 Cardiff	440 yards

Charles Terence Tobacco (March 2, 1936 – March 2, 2026) was a Canadian Olympic athlete.

== Biography ==
Originally from the village of Cumberland on Vancouver Island, Tobacco first got noticed at the age of 15 when he won both the 100 and 220 yard races at the Island high school championships.

Taken under the tutelage of Victoria "Flying Y" coach Bruce Humber he was just 17 when made the national team for the 1954 British Empire and Commonwealth Games, held locally in Vancouver. During the games he won two medals, a bronze in the 440 yard race and a silver in the 4×440 yard relay, in which he ran the anchor leg. For these performances he was honoured with British Columbia's "Top Male Athlete" of the year award in 1954.

Tobacco was a member of the Canadian team at the 1956 Summer Olympics in Melbourne. In the 400 metres individual race he won his heat, before being eliminated in the quarter-final stage, but participated in the final of the 400 metres relay. The Canadians finished fifth, behind the United States, Australia, Great Britain, and Germany. He ran his semi-final leg in 45.3 seconds.

At the 1958 British Empire and Commonwealth Games in Cardiff he was a bronze medallist again in the men's 440 yards race. He was a member of the relay team that finished fourth in the 4×440.

He also represented Canada at the 1960 Summer Olympics in Rome. Once again he made it through to the second round and he was also part of both the 4×100 and 4×400 relay teams which were semi-finalists.

An NCAA athlete for the University of Washington, Tobacco was a two-time Pacific Coast Conference champion in the 440.

Tobacco was inducted into the Greater Victoria Sports Hall of Fame in 2007. He died on March 2, 2026, his 90th birthday.
