= John Salisbury (athlete) =

British former athlete (born 1934)

Personal information
- Nationality: British (English)
- Born: 26 January 1934 (age 92) Birmingham, England
- Height: 180 cm (5 ft 11 in)
- Weight: 70 kg (154 lb)

Sport
- Sport: Athletics
- Event: 400 metres
- Club: Loughbrough Colleges AC; Birchfield Harriers
Medal record
Men's athletics
Representing Great Britain
Olympic Games
| Bronze medal – third place | 1956 Melbourne | 4×400 m |
European Championships
| Gold medal – first place | 1958 Stockholm | 4×400 m |
| Silver medal – second place | 1958 Stockholm | 400 m |

John Edward Salisbury (born 26 January 1934) is a British former 400 metres runner who competed at the 1956 Summer Olympics.

== Biography ==
Salisbury finished third behind Mike Wheeler in the 440 yards event at the 1956 AAA Championships.

Later that year he represented Great Britain at the 1956 Olympic Games in Melbourne, where he won the bronze medal in the 4 × 400 metres relay with his teammates Peter Higgins, Mike Wheeler and Derek Johnson.

Salisbury improved to second position at the 1957 AAA Championships behind Peter Higgins before he became the British 440 yards champion after winning the British AAA Championships title at the 1958 AAA Championships.

At the 1958 European Athletics Championships in Stockholm, Salisbury won the silver medal after completing the 400 metres in 46.5 seconds, as well as a gold medal in the 4 × 400 metres relay having recorded a time of 3 minutes 7.9 seconds. In the same year he represented the England team at the Commonwealth Games in Cardiff and won silver in the 4 × 440 yards relay with team members Derek Johnson, Edward Sampson, and John Wrighton. They recorded a time of 3 minutes 9.6 seconds.
