= George Shepherd (hurdler) =

Canadian hurdler (1938–2022)

Personal information
- Born: 23 April 1938 Port Colborne, Ontario, Canada
- Died: 19 May 2022 (aged 84)

Sport
- Sport: Track and field
- Event: 400 metres hurdles

George Shepherd (23 April 1938 – 19 May 2022) was a Canadian hurdler. He competed in the men's 400 metres hurdles at the 1960 Summer Olympics.
