= Sergio D'Asnasch =

Italian sprinter

Personal information
- Nationality: Italian
- Born: August 5, 1934 (age 92) La Spezia, Italy

Sport
- Country: Italy
- Sport: Athletics
- Event: Sprint
- Club: Atletica Riccardi

Achievements and titles
- Personal best: 200 m: 21.37 (1957)
Medal record
Mediterranean Games
Gold medal – first place	1955 Barcelona	4×100 metres relay

Sergio D'Asnasch (born 5 August 1934) is an Italian former sprinter.

== Biography ==
He competed in the 1956 Summer Olympics, he has 12 caps in national team from 1953 to 1958.

== Achievements ==
Year	Competition	Venue	Position	Event	Performance	Notes
1955	Mediterranean Games	(Spain) Barcelona	1st	4×100 metres relay	41.0	
1956	Olympic Games	(Australia) Melbourne	QF	200 metres	22.82	

== See also ==
- Italy national relay team
