= Derek Johnson (runner) =

British athlete (1933–2004)

Personal information
- Nationality: British (English)
- Born: 5 January 1933 East Ham, London, England
- Died: 30 August 2004 (aged 71) England
- Height: 176 cm (5 ft 9 in)
- Weight: 66 kg (146 lb)

Sport
- Sport: Athletics
- Events: 400m, 800m
- Club: Woodford Green AC
Medal record
Representing Great Britain
Athletics
Olympic Games
Silver medal – second place	1956 Melbourne	800 metres
Bronze medal – third place	1956 Melbourne	4x400 metre relay
Representing England
British Empire and Commonwealth Games
Gold medal – first place	1954 Vancouver	880 yards
Gold medal – first place	1954 Vancouver	4×440 yards relay
Silver medal – second place	1958 Cardiff	4×440 yards relay

Derek James Neville Johnson (5 January 1933 – 30 August 2004) was a British track and field athlete who competed at the 1956 Summer Olympics.

== Biography ==
Johnson was born in East Ham, London, and educated at East Ham Grammar School. He did his National Service in Egypt before going up to Lincoln College, Oxford, to read medicine in 1953.

He pursued an athletics career and finished second behind Peter Fryer in the 440 yards event at the 1954 AAA Championships. This led to selection for the 1954 British Empire and Commonwealth Games in Vancouver, where he subsequently represented England in the 880 yards and the 4 x 440 yards relay. He won two gold medals in the individual 880 yards event and the 4 x 440 yards relay event with Peter Higgins, Peter Fryer and Alan Dick.

Johnson became the British 880 yards champion after winning the British AAA Championships title at the 1955 AAA Championships, and went on to win a silver and bronze medal representing Great Britain at the 1956 Olympic Games in Melbourne, in the 800 metres and a bronze in the 4 x 400 metres relay respectively.

In 1958 he won a silver medal in the 4 x 440 yards relay in the 1958 British Empire and Commonwealth Games in Cardiff.

He was a leading light in the setting up of the "athletes' union", the International Athletes' Club, he led opposition to Margaret Thatcher's call for sportsmen to boycott the 1980 Moscow Olympics.

Johnson competed for Woodford Green AC, where he was coached to his success by Ken Bone and was later awarded Life Membership. In the 1980s he also became a member of the Serpentine Running Club and ran several London Marathons. A great ally of David Bedford and a leading administrator in athletics.
