= Kanji Akagi =

Japanese sprinter

Personal information
- Native name: 赤木 完次
- Nationality: Japanese
- Born: 3 April 1933 (age 93)

Sport
- Sport: Athletics
- Event: Sprinting

Achievements and titles
- Olympic finals: 1956 Summer Olympics

Kanji Akagi (赤木 完次, Akagi Kanji; born 3 April 1933) is a Japanese former sprinter who competed in the 1956 Summer Olympics.

Akagi won three Asian Games gold medals—two in athletics at the 1954 Asian Games and one in athletics at the 1958 Asian Games.
