= Athletics at the 1955 Summer International University Sports Week =

- Dates: 11–14 August
- Host city: San Sebastián, Spain
- Events: 29
- Participation: 22 nations

The athletics events at the 1955 Summer International University Sports Week were held in San Sebastián, Spain, between 11 and 14 August.

== Medal summary ==
=== Men ===
Event	Gold		Silver		Bronze	
100 metres	Jacques Vercruysse (BEL)	11.0	Lothar Prinz (FRG)	11.1	Stanley Orman (GBR)	11.1
200 metres	Grant Scruggs (USA)	21.7	Karl-Heinz Naujoks (FRG)	21.8	Lothar Prinz (FRG)	21.9
400 metres	Grant Scruggs (USA)	48.0	Jean-Jacques Hegg (SUI)	48.2	John Wrighton (GBR)	48.9
800 metres	Olaf Lawrenz (FRG)	1:51.5	Wolfgang Ring (FRG)	1:54.9	José María Giménez (ESP)	1:55.3
1500 metres	John Evans (GBR)	3:51.9	Martin Walmsley (GBR)	3:52.1	David Law (GBR)	3:53.4
5000 metres	Adrian Jackson (GBR)	15:04.4	Alan Gordon (GBR)	15:09.8	Stephan Lüpfert (FRG)	15:11.6
110 metres hurdles	Ezio Nardelli (ITA)	15.2	Jan Parlevliet (NED)	15.4	Vic Matthews (GBR)	15.4
400 metres hurdles	Jan Parlevliet (NED)	53.8	Gianfranco Fantuzzi (ITA)	53.9	Clive Dennis (GBR)	54.8
4 × 100 metres relay	(West Germany) F.R. Germany; Heinz Oberbeck; Lothar Prinz; Peter Röthig; Karl-Heinz Naujoks	42.5	(Italy) Italy; Mario Colarrosi; Sergio D'Asnasch; Angelo De Fraia; Franco Panizza	42.5	(United Kingdom) Great Britain & N.I. Stanley Orman; Graham Robertson; Gwilym Roberts; John Groves	43.1
4 × 400 metres relay	(United Kingdom) Great Britain & N.I. John Wrighton; Jim Paterson; Roger Baker; Jock Beesley	3:20.0	(West Germany) F.R. Germany; Rolf Ude; Urban Cleve; Wolfgang Ring; Heinrich Moser	3:20.5	(Italy) Italy; Enrico Archilli; Giovanni Bonanno; Mario Paoletti; Gianfranco Fantuzzi	3:20.5
Medley relay	(West Germany) F.R. Germany; Olaf Lawrenz; Lothar Prinz; Karl-Heinz Naujoks; Heinrich Moser	3:14.3	(United Kingdom) Great Britain & N.I. Donald Gorrie; John Wrighton; Graham Robertson; Stanley Orman	3:16.0	(Spain) Spain; José María Giménez; José Alonso Peralta; Fernando Bremón; Manuel García Cabrera	3:20.3
High jump	Mario Roveraro (ITA)	1.90	Yukio Ishikawa (JPN)	1.85	Juan Ignacio Ariño (ESP)	1.80
Pole vault	Edmondo Ballotta (ITA)	3.80	Wolfgang Goldenbohm (FRG)	3.70	Kenneth North (NZL)	3.70
Long jump	Ary de Sá (BRA)	7.50	Heinz Oberbeck (FRG)	7.37	Chiyoko Teruya (JPN)	7.17
Triple jump	Adhemar da Silva (BRA)	15.99	Akaru Abe (JPN)	15.18	Antonio Trogu (ITA)	14.96
Shot put	Heinz Lutter (FRG)	14.46	Alfred Meyer (SUI)	14.35	Piero Monguzzi (ITA)	13.74
Discus throw	Martin Bührle (FRG)	47.65	Luitpold Maier (FRG)	46.61	Luis Ortiz Urbina (ESP)	44.54
Hammer throw	John Bard (USA)	51.09	Takami Ogasawara (JPN)	49.97	Robert Scott (GBR)	48.64
Javelin throw	Hermann Rieder (FRG)	69.90	Peter Cullen (GBR)	64.15	Gian Luigi Farina (ITA)	62.12
Pentathlon	Walter Tschudi (SUI)	2797.00	Edy Egli (SUI)	2784.00	Hans von Schnering (FRG)	2761.00

=== Women ===
Event	Gold		Silver		Bronze	
100 metres	Giuseppina Leone (ITA)	12.0	Friederike Harasek (AUT)	12.5	Hilke Thymm (FRG)	12.6
200 metres	Giuseppina Leone (ITA)	24.8	Ann Cartwright (GBR)	25.8	L. Barr (GBR)	26.4
80 metres hurdles	Milena Greppi (ITA)	11.5	Hilke Thymm (FRG)	11.5	Ursula Schitteck (FRG)	12.5
4 × 100 metres relay	(Italy) Italy; Angiolina Costantino; Giuseppina Leone; Luciana Cecchi; Milena Greppi	49.0	(West Germany) F.R. Germany; Hilde Ostermann; Hilke Thymm; Ilse Schauwienhold; Ursula Schitteck	49.5	(United Kingdom) Great Britain & N.I. L. Barr; W. Bowden; Ann Cartwright; Mary Bridgeford	50.5
High jump	Lesley Line (GBR)	1.55	Ursula Schitteck (FRG)	1.45	Mary Bridgeford (GBR)	1.40
Long jump	Friederike Harasek (AUT)	5.54	Ursula Schitteck (FRG)	5.48	Ilse Schauwienhold (FRG)	5.40
Shot put	Lore Klute (FRG)	13.13	Almut Brömmel (FRG)	11.63	Ursula Dreimann (FRG)	11.26
Discus throw	Almut Brömmel (FRG)	43.48	Lore Klute (FRG)	41.51	Maya Giri (GBR)	41.39
Javelin throw	Almut Brömmel (FRG)	45.44	Ursula Dreimann (FRG)	38.65	Edith Schiller (FRG)	36.87

== Medal table ==
Rank	Nation	Gold	Silver	Bronze	Total
1	West Germany (FRG)	9	14	8	31
2	Italy (ITA)	7	2	4	13
3	Great Britain (GBR)	4	5	11	20
4	United States (USA)	3	0	0	3
5	Brazil (BRA)	2	0	0	2
6	Switzerland (SUI)	1	3	0	4
7	Austria (AUT)	1	1	0	2
7	Netherlands (NED)	1	1	0	2
9	Belgium (BEL)	1	0	0	1
10	Japan (JPN)	0	3	1	4
11	Spain (ESP)	0	0	4	4
12	New Zealand (NZL)	0	0	1	1
Totals (12 entries)		29	29	29	87

== See also ==
- FISU World University Games § Precursors
- University and college sport
