= Athletics at the 1964 Summer Olympics – Men's 4 × 100 metres relay =

Men's 4 × 100 metres relay at the Games of the XVIII Olympiad
- Venue: Olympic Stadium
- Dates: 20–21 October 1964
- Competitors: 85 from 21 nations

Medalists
| 1st place, gold medalist(s) | | Paul Drayton; Gerry Ashworth; Richard Stebbins; Bob Hayes | United States |
| 2nd place, silver medalist(s) | | Andrzej Zieliński; Wieslaw Maniak; Marian Foik; Marian Dudziak | Poland |
| 3rd place, bronze medalist(s) | | Paul Genevay; Bernard Laidebeur; Claude Piquemal; Jocelyn Delecour | France |

Official Video Highlights @54:25 Video on YouTube

The men's 4 × 100 metres relay was the shorter of the two men's relays on the Athletics at the 1964 Summer Olympics program in Tokyo. It was held on 20 October and 21 October 1964. 21 teams, for a total of 85 athletes, from 21 nations competed, with 1 team of 4 not starting in the first round. The first round and the semifinals were held on 20 October with the final on 21 October.

The traditionally strong American team was weakened by the injuries to Mel Pender and Trent Jackson. The defending champions United Team of Germany (with no returning members) failed to get out of the semi-finals.

The final began with Andrzej Zieliński out fast, making up the stagger on American substitute Paul Drayton on his outside. The Poles exchanged smoothly and their 4th place runner from the finals Wieslaw Maniak held a foot advantage on (plus the stagger) on Gerry Ashworth. Inside of them, France and Jamaica were making strong showings. Claude Piquemal put France into the lead through the turn with Jamaica, USSR and Poland all ahead when substitute Richard Stebbins handed off to Bob Hayes 3 meters behind France's Jocelyn Delecour. Hayes making up the gap halfway down the straightaway then pulled away to a clear American victory and new world record. 3 meters behind Hayes, Poland's Marian Dudziak was able to out lean Delecour for silver. The United States' Bob Hayes ran the final 100m of the relay in 8.6 seconds according to some estimate. This remains the fastest anchor leg of all time.

Delecour famously said to Drayton before the relay final that, "You can't win, all you have is Bob Hayes." Drayton was able to reply afterwards, "That's all we need."

== Results ==
=== First round ===
The top four teams in each of the 3 heats as well as the four fastest remaining team advanced.

==== First round, heat 1 ====
| Place | Nation | Athletes | Time (hand) | Time (automatic) |
|---|---|---|---|---|
| 1 | Italy | Livio Berruti, Ennio Preatoni, Sergio Ottolina, Pasquale Giannattasio | 39.7 | 39.74 |
| 2 | Poland | Andrzej Zieliński, Wiesław Maniak, Marian Foik, Marian Dudziak | 39.9 | 39.96 |
| 3 | Great Britain | Peter Radford, Ronald Jones, Menzies Campbell, Lynn Davies | 40.1 | 40.13 |
| 4 | Hungary | Huba Rozsnyai, Csaba Csutoras, Laszlo Mihalyfi, Gyula Rabai | 40.3 | 40.32 |
| 5 | Nigeria | Sydney Asiodu, Folu Erinle, James Omagbemi, Abdul Amu | 40.4 | 40.44 |
| 6 | Malaysia | Mazlan Hamzah, John Daukom, Canagasabai Kunalan, Mani Jegathesan | 41.4 | – |
| — | Iraq | Jasim Karim Kuraishi, Samir Vincent, Khalid Tawfik Lazim, Khudher Zalada | Did not finish | – |

==== First round, heat 2 ====
| Place | Nation | Athletes | Time (hand) | Time (automatic) |
|---|---|---|---|---|
| 1 | United States | Paul Drayton, Gerry Ashworth, Richard Stebbins, Bob Hayes | 39.8 | 39.83 |
| 2 | Venezuela | Arquímedes Herrera, Lloyd Murad, Rafael Romero, Hortensio Fucil | 40.1 | 40.10 |
| 3 | United Team of Germany | Heinz Erbstosser, Rainer Berger, Peter Wallach, Volker Löffler | 40.2 | 40.21 |
| 4 | Senegal | Malang Mané, Bassirou Doumbia, Malick Diop, Alioune Sow | 40.5 | 40.55 |
| 5 | India | Anthony Coutinho, Makhan Singh, Kenneth Powell, Rajasekaran Pichaya | 40.6 | 40.68 |
| 6 | Japan | Iijima Hideo, Kamata Masaru, Kiyoshi Asai, Yojiro Muro | 41.0 | – |
| 7 | Thailand | Taweesit Arjtaweekul, Suthi Manyakass, Maitri Vilaikit, Chalit Kanitasut | 41.8 | – |

==== First round, heat 3 ====
| Place | Nation | Athletes | Time (hand) | Time (automatic) |
|---|---|---|---|---|
| 1 | France | Paul Genevay, Bernard Laidebeur, Claude Piquemal, Jocelyn Delecour | 39.8 | 39.84 |
| 2 | Jamaica | Pablo McNeil, Patrick Robinson, Lynn Headley, Dennis Johnson | 40.1 | 40.11 |
| 3 | Soviet Union | Edvin Ozolin, Boris Zubov, Gusman Kosanov, Boris Savchuk | 40.1 | 40.19 |
| 4 | Australia | Bob Lay, Eric Bigby, William Earle, Gary Holdsworth | 40.6 | 40.64 |
| 5 | Ghana | Michael Okantey, Michael Ahey, Ebenezer Addy, Stanley Fabian Allotey | 40.8 | 40.85 |
| 6 | Uganda | Aggrey Awori, Erasmus Amukun, James Odongo Oduka, Amos Omolo | 41.4 | – |
| 7 | Philippines | Arnulfo Valles, Miguel Ebreo, Claro Pellosis, Rogelio Onofre | 41.7 | – |

=== Semifinals ===
The top four teams in each of the two semifinals advanced to the final.

==== Semifinal 1 ====
Okorafor took Amu's place for Nigeria.

The American team tied the old Olympic record at 39.5.

| Place | Nation | Athletes | Time (hand) | Time (automatic) |
|---|---|---|---|---|
| 1 | United States | Paul Drayton, Gerry Ashworth, Richard Stebbins, Bob Hayes | 39.5 =OR | 39.50 |
| 2 | France | Paul Genevay, Bernard Laidebeur, Claude Piquemal, Jocelyn Delecour | 39.6 | 39.66 |
| 3 | Jamaica | Pablo McNeil, Patrick Robinson, Lynn Headley, Dennis Johnson | 39.6 | 39.68 |
| 4 | Great Britain | Peter Radford, Ronald Jones, Menzies Campbell, Lynn Davies | 40.1 | 40.13 |
| 5 | Australia | Robert William Lay, Eric James Bigby, William Joseph Earle, Gary Alfred Holdsworth | 40.1 | 40.19 |
| 6 | Nigeria | Sydney Asiodu, Folu Erinle, James Omagbemi, Lawrence Okoroafor | 40.1 | 40.19 |
| 7 | Hungary | Huba Rozsnyai, Csaba Csutoras, Laszlo Mihalyfi, Gyula Rabai | 40.3 | 40.31 |
| 8 | Ghana | Michael Okantey, Michael Ahey, Ebenezer Addy, Stanley Fabian Allotey | 40.7 | – |

==== Semifinal 2 ====
| Place | Nation | Athletes | Time (hand) | Time (automatic) |
|---|---|---|---|---|
| 1 | Italy | Livio Berruti, Ennio Preatoni, Sergio Ottolina, Pasquale Giannattasio | 39.6 | 39.63 |
| 2 | Poland | Andrzej Zieliński, Wiesław Maniak, Marian Foik, Marian Dudziak | 39.6 | 39.63 |
| 3 | Venezuela | Arquimedes Herrera, Lloyd Murad, Rafael Romero, Hortensio Herrera Fucil | 39.6 | 39.65 |
| 4 | Soviet Union | Edvin Ozolin, Boris Zubov, Gusman Kosanov, Boris Savchuk | 39.7 | 39.70 |
| 5 | United Team of Germany | Heinz Erbstosser, Rainer Berger, Peter Wallach, Volker Loffler | 40.1 | 40.16 |
| 6 | Senegal | Malang Mané, Bassirou Doumya, Malick Diop, Alioune Sow | 40.2 | 40.26 |
| 7 | India | Anthony Francis Coutinho, Makhan Singh, Kenneth Lawrence Powell, Rajasekaran Pichaya | 40.5 | – |
| 8 | Japan | Iijima Hideo, Kamata Masaru, Asai Kiyoshi, Muro Yojiro | 40.6 | – |

=== Final ===
Venezuela and Italy tied the old Olympic record. The United States, Poland, France, Jamaica, and the Soviet Union all broke it, with the U.S. also breaking the world record. The United States' Bob Hayes ran the final 100m of the relay in 8.6, passing three teams and bringing the U.S. from 4th to 1st place. This was considered the fastest anchor leg of all time until the 1980s.

| Place | Lane | Nation | Athletes | Time (hand) | Time (automatic) |
|---|---|---|---|---|---|
| 1 | 7 | United States | Paul Drayton, Gerry Ashworth, Richard Stebbins, Bob Hayes | 39.0 WR | 39.06 |
| 2 | 6 | Poland | Andrzej Zieliński, Wiesław Maniak, Marian Foik, Marian Dudziak | 39.3 | 39.36 |
| 3 | 2 | France | Paul Genevay, Bernard Laidebeur, Claude Piquemal, Jocelyn Delecour | 39.3 | 39.36 |
| 4 | 4 | Jamaica | Pablo McNeil, Patrick Robinson, Lynn Headley, Dennis Johnson | 39.4 | 39.49 |
| 5 | 8 | Soviet Union | Edvin Ozolin, Boris Zubov, Gusman Kosanov, Boris Savchuk | 39.4 | 39.50 |
| 6 | 5 | Venezuela | Arquimedes Herrera, Lloyd Murad, Rafael Romero, Hortensio Herrera Fucil | 39.5 | 39.53 |
| 7 | 3 | Italy | Livio Berruti, Ennio Preatoni, Sergio Ottolina, Pasquale Giannattasio | 39.5 | 39.54 |
| 8 | 1 | Great Britain | Peter Radford, Ronald Jones, Menzies Campbell, Lynn Davies | 39.6 | 39.69 |
