= 1962 European Athletics Championships – Men's 100 metres =

Men's 100 metres at the 1962 European Athletics Championships
- Venue: JNA Stadium
- Location: Belgrade
- Dates: 12 September (heats); 13 September (semifinals & final)
- Competitors: 29 from 18 nations
- Winning time: 10.4

Medalists
gold medal	Claude Piquemal	France
silver medal	Jocelyn Delecour	France
bronze medal	Peter Gamper	West Germany

The men's 100 metres at the 1962 European Athletics Championships was held in Belgrade, then Yugoslavia, at JNA Stadium on 12 and 13 September 1962.

== Participation ==
According to an unofficial count, 29 athletes from 14 countries participated in the event.

- Bulgaria (2)
- Czechoslovakia (1)
- France (3)
- Hungary (3)
- Italy (1)
- Malta (1)
- Norway (1)
- Poland (3)
- Soviet Union (3)
- Sweden (3)
- Switzerland (1)
- Turkey (1)
- Great Britain (3)
- West Germany (3)

== Results ==
=== Heats ===
12 September

==== Heat 1 ====
Wind: 0 m/s

Rank	Name	Nationality	Time	Notes
1	Heinz Schumann	West Germany	10.4	Q
2	Nikolay Politiko	Soviet Union	10.5	Q
3	Vilém Mandlík	Czechoslovakia	10.5	Q
4	Jean-Louis Descloux	Switzerland	10.5	
5	Gyula Rábai	Hungary	10.6	
6	Eucharist Agreach	Malta	11.8	
			Wind: 0.0 m/s	

==== Heat 2 ====
Wind: 0.2 m/s

Rank	Name	Nationality	Time	Notes
1	Marian Foik	Poland	10.3	CR, Q
2	Peter Radford	Great Britain	10.4	Q
3	Guy Lagorce	France	10.6	Q
4	Veselin Valov	Bulgaria	10.7	
			Wind: +0.2 m/s	

==== Heat 3 ====
Rank	Name	Nationality	Time	Notes
1	Peter Gamper	West Germany	10.3	CR, Q
2	Jerzy Juskowiak	Poland	10.4	Q
3	Armin Tuyakov	Soviet Union	10.5	Q
4	László Mihályfi	Hungary	10.6	
5	Sven Hortewall	Sweden	10.6	
6	Ferruh Oygur	Turkey	11.0	
			Wind: 0.0 m/s	

==== Heat 4 ====
Rank	Name	Nationality	Time	Notes
1	Alfred Hebauf	West Germany	10.3	CR, Q
2	Edvin Ozolin	Soviet Union	10.5	Q
3	Andrzej Zieliński	Poland	10.6	Q
4	Sven-Åke Lövgren	Sweden	10.7	
			Wind: 0.0 m/s	

==== Heat 5 ====
Rank	Name	Nationality	Time	Notes
1	Jocelyn Delecour	France	10.5	Q
2	Mikhail Bachvarov	Bulgaria	10.6	Q
3	Alf Meakin	Great Britain	10.6	Q
4	Carl Fredrik Bunæs	Norway	10.7	
			Wind: 0.0 m/s	

==== Heat 6 ====
Rank	Name	Nationality	Time	Notes
1	Claude Piquemal	France	10.5	Q
2	Livio Berruti	Italy	10.5	Q
3	Berwyn Jones	Great Britain	10.5	Q
4	Owe Jonsson	Sweden	10.5	
5	Csaba Csutorás	Hungary	10.6	
			Wind: 0.0 m/s	

=== Semi-finals ===
12 September

==== Semi-final 1 ====
Rank	Name	Nationality	Time	Notes
1	Alfred Hebauf	West Germany	10.4	Q
2	Claude Piquemal	France	10.4	Q
3	Livio Berruti	Italy	10.5	
4	Peter Radford	Great Britain	10.5	
5	Mikhail Bachvarov	Bulgaria	10.5	
6	Nikolay Politiko	Soviet Union	23.4	
			Wind: -0.6 m/s	

==== Semi-final 2 ====
Rank	Name	Nationality	Time	Notes
1	Peter Gamper	West Germany	10.3	CR, Q
2	Marian Foik	Poland	10.4	Q
3	Guy Lagorce	France	10.5	
4	Andrzej Zieliński	Poland	10.6	
5	Armin Tuyakov	Soviet Union	10.6	
6	Alf Meakin	Great Britain	10.7	
			Wind: -0.3 m/s	

==== Semi-final 3 ====
Rank	Name	Nationality	Time	Notes
1	Jerzy Juskowiak	Poland	10.4	Q
2	Jocelyn Delecour	France	10.4	Q
3	Heinz Schumann	West Germany	10.4	
4	Edvin Ozolin	Soviet Union	10.5	
5	Berwyn Jones	Great Britain	10.5	
6	Vilém Mandlík	Czechoslovakia	10.6	
			Wind: -0.4 m/s	

=== Final ===
13 September

Rank	Name	Nationality	Time	Notes
1st place, gold medalist(s)	Claude Piquemal	France	10.4	
2nd place, silver medalist(s)	Jocelyn Delecour	France	10.4	
3rd place, bronze medalist(s)	Peter Gamper	West Germany	10.4	
4	Alfred Hebauf	West Germany	10.4	
5	Jerzy Juskowiak	Poland	10.4	
6	Marian Foik	Poland	10.5	
			Wind: -0.6 m/s	
