= 1962 European Athletics Championships – Men's 4 × 100 metres relay =

Men's 4 × 100 metres relay at the European Athletics Championships

The men's 4 × 100 metres relay at the 1962 European Athletics Championships was held in Belgrade, then Yugoslavia, at JNA Stadium on 14 and 16 September 1962.

== Medalists ==
Gold	Klaus Ulonska; Peter Gamper; Joachim Bender; Manfred Germar; West Germany
Silver	Jerzy Juskowiak; Andrzej Zieliński; Zbigniew Syka; Marian Foik; Poland
Bronze	Alf Meakin; Ron Jones; Berwyn Jones; David Jones; Great Britain

== Results ==
=== Final ===
16 September

Rank	Nation	Competitors	Time	Notes
1st place, gold medalist(s)	West Germany	Klaus Ulonska; Peter Gamper; Joachim Bender; Manfred Germar	39.5	CR NR
2nd place, silver medalist(s)	Poland	Jerzy Juskowiak; Andrzej Zieliński; Zbigniew Syka; Marian Foik	39.5	CR NR
3rd place, bronze medalist(s)	Great Britain	Alf Meakin; Ron Jones; Berwyn Jones; David Jones	39.8	NR
4	France	Jean-Paul Lambrot; Guy Lagorce; Claude Piquemal; Jocelyn Delecour	40.0	
5	Italy	Livio Berruti; Sergio Ottolina; Armando Sardi; Flavio Colani	40.3	
6	Hungary	Imre Babos; Csaba Csutorás; László Mihályfi; Gyula Rábai	40.5	

=== Heats ===
14 September

==== Heat 1 ====
Rank	Nation	Competitors	Time	Notes
1	France	Jean-Paul Lambrot; Guy Lagorce; Claude Piquemal; Jocelyn Delecour	40.0	CR Q
2	Hungary	Imre Babos; Csaba Csutorás; László Mihályfi; Gyula Rábai	40.5	Q
3	Italy	Livio Berruti; Sergio Ottolina; Armando Sardi; Flavio Colani	40.6	Q
4	Soviet Union	Amin Tuyakov; Edvin Ozolin; Slava Prokhorovskiy; Igor Ter-Ovanesyan	40.8	

==== Heat 2 ====
Rank	Nation	Competitors	Time	Notes
1	Great Britain	Alf Meakin; Ron Jones; Berwyn Jones; David Jones	39.8	CR NR Q
2	West Germany	Klaus Ulonska; Peter Gamper; Joachim Bender; Manfred Germar	39.9	Q
3	Poland	Jerzy Juskowiak; Andrzej Zieliński; Zbigniew Syka; Marian Foik	39.9	NR Q
4	Sweden	Sven Hortewall; Bo Althoff; Sven-Åke Lövgren; Owe Jonsson	40.1	NR
5	Bulgaria	Yordan Glukhchov; Veselin Valov; Todor Stalev; Mikhail Bachvarov	41.3	NR

== Participation ==
According to an unofficial count, 36 athletes from 9 countries participated in the event.

- Bulgaria (4)
- France (4)
- Hungary (4)
- Italy (4)
- Poland (4)
- Soviet Union (4)
- Sweden (4)
- Great Britain (4)
- West Germany (4)
