= Athletics at the 1964 Summer Olympics – Men's 200 metres =

Men's 200 metres at the Games of the XVIII Olympiad
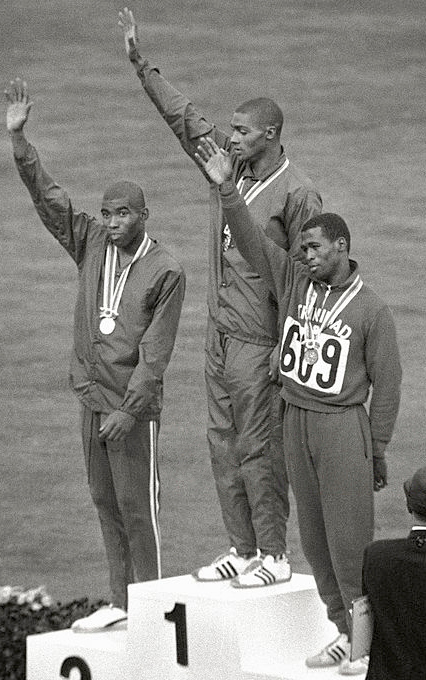
- Paul Drayton, Henry Carr and Edwin Roberts
- Venue: Olympic Stadium
- Dates: 16–17 October 1964
- Competitors: 57 from 42 nations
- Winning time: 20.3 OR

Medalists
1st place, gold medalist(s)		Henry Carr; United States
2nd place, silver medalist(s)		Paul Drayton; United States
3rd place, bronze medalist(s)		Edwin Roberts; Trinidad and Tobago

The men's 200 metres was the second-shortest of the men's track races in the Athletics at the 1964 Summer Olympics program in Tokyo. 63 athletes from 48 nations entered, with 6 not starting in the first round. The maximum number of athletes per nation had been set at 3 since the 1930 Olympic Congress. The first two rounds were held on 16 October, with the semifinals and the final on 17 October. The event was won by 0.2 seconds by Henry Carr of the United States, the nation's 11th victory in the event. Fellow American Paul Drayton took silver; it was the fifth time in six Games that the United States had the top two finishers. Edwin Roberts gave Trinidad and Tobago its first medal in the men's 200 metres with his bronze.

== Background ==
This was the 14th appearance of the event, which was not held at the first Olympics in 1896 but has been on the program ever since. Two of the six finalists from the 1960 Games returned: gold medalist Livio Berruti of Italy and fourth-place finisher Marian Foik of Poland. The American team, however, was favored: Henry Carr had won the AAU championship in 1964, Paul Drayton had won in 1961 and 1962, and the two had tied in 1963. Carr held the world record of 20.2 seconds (set in a 220 yards race).

Cameroon, Colombia, Hong Kong, Iran, Madagascar, Northern Rhodesia, Rhodesia, and Senegal each made their debut in the event. The United States made its 14th appearance, the only nation to have competed at each edition of the 200 metres to date.

== Competition format ==
The competition used the four round format introduced in 1920: heats, quarterfinals, semifinals, and a final. The "fastest loser" system introduced in 1960 was not used, with the number of heats in each round make it unnecessary. The 1964 competition made the 8 person heat standard.

There were 8 heats of between 7 and 8 runners each (before withdrawals), with the top 4 men in each advancing to the quarterfinals. The quarterfinals consisted of 4 heats of 8 athletes each; the 4 fastest men in each heat advanced to the semifinals. There were 2 semifinals, each with 8 runners. Again, the top 4 athletes advanced. The final had 8 runners. The races were run on a 400 metre track.

== Records ==
Prior to the competition, the existing world and Olympic records were as follows.

World record	Henry Carr (USA)	20.2y	Tempe, United States	4 April 1964
Olympic record	Livio Berruti (ITA)	20.5	Rome, Italy	3 September 1960

Paul Drayton matched the Olympic record of 20.5 seconds in the first semifinal. He ran the same time in the final, but Henry Carr won in 20.3 seconds to set a new Olympic record.

== Schedule ==
All times are Japan Standard Time (UTC+9)

Date	Time	Round
Friday, 16 October 1964	10:30; 14:30	Heats; Quarterfinals
Saturday, 17 October 1964	14:30; 16:00	Semifinals; Final

== Results ==
=== Heats ===
The top four runners in each of the 8 heats advanced.

==== Heat 1 ====
Wind: +0.6 m/s

Rank	Athlete	Nation	Time (hand)	Time (automatic)	Notes
1	Paul Drayton	United States	20.7	20.70	Q
2	Andrzej Zielinski	Poland	21.2	21.24	Q
3	Clifton Bertrand	Trinidad and Tobago	21.3	21.39	Q
4	Johan du Preez	Rhodesia	21.4	21.45	Q
5	Jean-Louis Descloux	Switzerland	21.5	21.52	
6	F. J. Gutierrez Hernandez	Colombia	21.8	21.88	
7	Gerardo di Tolla	Peru	22.1	–	
8	Somsak Thongsuk	Thailand	22.6	–	

==== Heat 2 ====
Wind: +0.2 m/s

Rank	Athlete	Nation	Time (hand)	Time (automatic)	Notes
1	Roger Bambuck	France	21.2	21.29	Q
2	Arquímedes Herrera	Venezuela	21.3	21.38	Q
3	Boris Zubov	Soviet Union	21.4	21.46	Q
4	Peter Radford	Great Britain	21.5	21.52	Q
5	Erasmus Amukun	Uganda	21.5	21.55	
6	Carlos Lorenzo Manueco	Mexico	21.6	21.60	
—	Levy Psawkin	Israel	DNS	–	
—	Iijima Hideo	Japan	DNS	–	

==== Heat 3 ====
Wind: +0.3 m/s

Rank	Athlete	Nation	Time (hand)	Time (automatic)	Notes
1	Menzies Campbell	Great Britain	21.3	21.33	Q
2	Serafino Antao	Kenya	21.5	21.52	Q
3	Csaba Csutoras	Hungary	21.5	21.54	Q
4	B. El Maachi Bouchaib	Morocco	21.5	21.58	Q
5	David Njitock	Cameroon	22.5	–	
6	Wesley Johnson	Liberia	24.7	–	
—	Eric James Bigby	Australia	DNS	–	
—	Pablo McNeil	Jamaica	DNS	–	

==== Heat 4 ====
Wind: 0.0 m/s

Rank	Athlete	Nation	Time (hand)	Time (automatic)	Notes
1	Marian Foik	Poland	21.1	21.11	Q
2	Sergio Ottolina	Italy	21.2	21.27	Q
3	Edvin Ozolin	Soviet Union	21.3	21.32	Q
4	Jeffery Smith	Northern Rhodesia	21.7	21.77	Q
5	Jassim Karim Kuraishi	Iraq	22.6	–	
6	Lee Ar-tu	Taiwan	23.0	–	
—	Enrique Figuerola	Cuba	DNS	–	

==== Heat 5 ====
Wind: 0.0 m/s

Rank	Athlete	Nation	Time (hand)	Time (automatic)	Notes
1	Harry Jerome	Canada	20.9	20.95	Q
2	M. Jegathesan	Malaysia	20.9	20.99	Q
3	Paul Genevay	France	21.0	21.08	Q
4	Franciscus Luitjes	Netherlands	21.1	21.13	Q
5	Heinz Erbstosser	United Team of Germany	21.4	21.40	
6	Tegegn Bezabih	Ethiopia	22.0	22.03	
7	Abdolvahab Shahkhoreh	Iran	22.3	–	
—	Borys Savchuk	Soviet Union	DSQ	–	

==== Heat 6 ====
Wind: +0.1 m/s

Rank	Athlete	Nation	Time (hand)	Time (automatic)	Notes
1	Edwin Roberts	Trinidad and Tobago	20.8	20.89	Q
2	Bob Lay	Australia	21.3	21.34	Q
3	Pedro Grajales	Colombia	21.4	21.48	Q
4	David Ejoke	Nigeria	21.4	21.48	Q
5	George Reginald Collie	Bahamas	21.9	21.91	
6	Kenneth Lawrence Powell	India	21.9	21.94	
7	Aggrey Sheroy Awori	Uganda	22.2	–	
8	William Hill	Hong Kong	22.5	–	

==== Heat 7 ====
Wind: -1.4 m/s

Rank	Athlete	Nation	Time (hand)	Time (automatic)	Notes
1	Heinz Schumann	United Team of Germany	21.0	21.09	Q
2	Henry Carr	United States	21.1	21.12	Q
3	Jocelyn Delecour	France	21.3	21.38	Q
4	Ivan Moreno	Chile	21.5	21.55	Q
5	Alioune Sow	Senegal	21.9	21.91	
6	Michael Okantey	Ghana	21.9	21.97	
7	Rogelio Onofre	Philippines	22.1	22.17	
—	Tom Robinson	Bahamas	DNS	–	

==== Heat 8 ====
Wind: +0.9 m/s

Rank	Athlete	Nation	Time (hand)	Time (automatic)	Notes
1	Livio Berruti	Italy	21.1	21.11	Q
2	Richard Stebbins	United States	21.1	21.17	Q
3	Fritz Roderfeld	United Team of Germany	21.5	21.58	Q
4	Gary Holdsworth	Australia	21.6	21.65	Q
5	Jose Fernandes da Rocha	Portugal	21.7	21.79	
6	Valeriu Jurca	Romania	21.8	21.82	
7	Chung Ki Sun	South Korea	22.3	–	
8	Jean-Louis Ravelomanantsoa	Madagascar	22.4	–	

=== Quarterfinals ===
The four fastest runners in each of the four heats advanced to the semifinals.

==== Quarterfinal 1 ====
Wind: -0.9 m/s

Rank	Athlete	Nation	Time (hand)	Time (automatic)	Notes
1	Paul Drayton	United States	20.9	20.98	Q
2	Livio Berruti	Italy	21.2	21.24	Q
3	M. Jegathesan	Malaysia	21.4	21.40	Q
4	Jocelyn Delecour	France	21.5	21.58	Q
5	Andrzej Zielinski	Poland	21.5	21.59	
6	Boris Zubov	Soviet Union	21.8	21.86	
7	Jeffery Smith	Northern Rhodesia	22.0	22.05	
8	Serafino Antao	Kenya	22.1	22.11	

==== Quarterfinal 2 ====
Wind: -1.2 m/s

Rank	Athlete	Nation	Time (hand)	Time (automatic)	Notes
1	Henry Carr	United States	21.0	21.02	Q
2	Sergio Ottolina	Italy	21.1	21.16	Q
3	Heinz Schumann	United Team of Germany	21.2	21.25	Q
4	Arquimedes Herrera	Venezuela	21.2	21.29	Q
5	Bob Lay	Australia	21.4	21.49	
6	Csaba Csutoras	Hungary	21.4	21.50	
7	Ivan Moreno	Chile	21.7	21.74	
8	Johan du Preez	Rhodesia	21.8	21.87	

==== Quarterfinal 3 ====
Wind: -2.9 m/s

Rank	Athlete	Nation	Time (hand)	Time (automatic)	Notes
1	Harry Jerome	Canada	21.2	21.23	Q
2	Richard Stebbins	United States	21.2	21.28	Q
3	Roger Bambuck	France	21.4	21.47	Q
4	B. El Maachi Boushaib	Morocco	21.6	21.66	Q
5	Clifton Bertrand	Trinidad and Tobago	21.6	21.69	
6	Menzies Campbell	Great Britain	21.7	21.74	
7	P. A. Grajales Escobar	Colombia	21.7	21.78	
8	Friedrich Roderfeld	United Team of Germany	22.2	22.29	

==== Quarterfinal 4 ====
Wind: -2.2 m/s

Rank	Athlete	Nation	Time (hand)	Time (automatic)	Notes
1	Edwin Roberts	Trinidad and Tobago	20.9	20.90	Q
2	Marian Foik	Poland	21.0	21.08	Q
3	Paul Genevay	France	21.3	21.35	Q
4	Franciscus Luitjes	Netherlands	21.4	21.40	Q
5	Edvin Ozolin	Soviet Union	21.4	21.47	
6	Peter Radford	Great Britain	21.5	21.53	
7	Gary Holdsworth	Australia	22.1	22.13	
—	David Ejoke	Nigeria	DNS	–	

=== Semifinals ===
The top four runners in each of the two semifinals qualified for the final.

==== Semifinal 1 ====
Drayton tied the Olympic record in this semifinal, three-tenths of a second short of the world record.

Wind: +0.4 m/s

Rank	Athlete	Nation	Time (hand)	Time (automatic)	Notes
1	Paul Drayton	United States	20.5	20.58	Q, =OR
2	Sergio Ottolina	Italy	20.7	20.76	Q
3	Richard Stebbins	United States	20.8	20.88	Q
4	Marian Foik	Poland	20.9	20.94	Q
5	Paul Genevay	France	20.9	21.00	
6	Arquimedes Herrera	Venezuela	21.0	21.07	
7	Franciscus Luitjes	Netherlands	21.1	21.16	
8	B. El Maachi Bouchaib	Morocco	21.6	21.61	

==== Semifinal 2 ====
The second semifinal was the fourth race of the 200 metres in which an American won and an Italian took second place.

Wind: +0.5 m/s

Rank	Athlete	Nation	Time (hand)	Time (automatic)	Notes
1	Henry Carr	United States	20.6	20.69	Q
2	Livio Berruti	Italy	20.7	20.78	Q
3	Edwin Roberts	Trinidad and Tobago	20.8	20.86	Q
4	Harry Jerome	Canada	21.0	21.01	Q
5	Roger Bambuck	France	21.0	21.06	
6	Heinz Schumann	United Team of Germany	21.1	21.18	
7	Jocelyn Delecour	France	21.2	21.26	
8	M. Jegathesan	Malaysia	21.2	21.26	

=== Final ===
Drayton matched his semifinal time, which had tied the Olympic record at 20.5 seconds, but Carr did even better, setting a new Olympic record of 20.3 seconds to bump Drayton to the silver medal. Carr's time was only one-tenth of a second off the world record.

Wind: -0.8 m/s

Rank	Athlete	Nation	Time (hand)	Time (automatic)	Notes
1st place, gold medalist(s)	Henry Carr	United States	20.3	20.36	OR
2nd place, silver medalist(s)	Paul Drayton	United States	20.5	20.58	
3rd place, bronze medalist(s)	Edwin Roberts	Trinidad and Tobago	20.6	20.63	
4	Harry Jerome	Canada	20.7	20.79	
5	Livio Berruti	Italy	20.8	20.83	
6	Marian Foik	Poland	20.8	20.83	
7	Richard Stebbins	United States	20.8	20.89	
8	Sergio Ottolina	Italy	20.9	20.94	
