= 1962 European Athletics Championships – Men's 200 metres =

Men's 200 metres at the 1962 European Athletics Championships
- Venue: JNA Stadium
- Location: Belgrade
- Dates: 15 August (heats); 16 August (semi-finals); 17 August (final)
- Competitors: 26 from 15 nations
- Winning time: 20.7

Medalists
gold medal	Owe Jonsson	Sweden
silver medal	Marian Foik	Poland
bronze medal	Sergio Ottolina	Italy

The men's 200 metres at the 1962 European Athletics Championships was held in Belgrade, then Yugoslavia, at JNA Stadium on 14, 15, and 16 September 1962.

== Participation ==
According to an unofficial count, 26 athletes from 15 countries participated in the event.

- Austria (1)
- Czechoslovakia (2)
- France (2)
- Great Britain (3)
- Hungary (2)
- Italy (2)
- Norway (1)
- Poland (3)
- Romania (1)
- Soviet Union (2)
- Sweden (1)
- Switzerland (1)
- Turkey (1)
- West Germany (3)
- Yugoslavia (1)

== Results ==
=== Heats ===
14 September

==== Heat 1 ====
Rank	Name	Nationality	Time	Notes
1	Paul Genevay	France	21.1	Q
2	Peter Radford	Great Britain	21.3	Q
3	Edvin Ozolin	Soviet Union	21.4	Q
4	Andrzej Karcz	Poland	21.5	
			Wind: +1.9 m/s	

==== Heat 2 ====
Rank	Name	Nationality	Time	Notes
1	Sergio Ottolina	Italy	21.0	Q
2	Michael Hildrey	Great Britain	21.4	Q
3	Manfred Germar	West Germany	21.6	Q
4	Jean-Louis Descloux	Switzerland	21.7	
			Wind: +3.1 m/s	

==== Heat 3 ====
Rank	Name	Nationality	Time	Notes
1	Marian Foik	Poland	20.9	Q
2	David Jones	Great Britain	20.9	Q
3	Klaus Ulonska	West Germany	21.3	Q
4	Amin Tuyakov	Soviet Union	21.8	
			Wind: +5.8 m/s	

==== Heat 4 ====
Rank	Name	Nationality	Time	Notes
1	Owe Jonsson	Sweden	20.8	Q, CR
2	Jocelyn Delecour	France	20.9	Q
3	Valeriu Jurcă	Romania	21.8	Q
4	Josip Šarić	Yugoslavia	22.1	
			Wind: +1.1 m/s	

==== Heat 5 ====
Rank	Name	Nationality	Time	Notes
1	Heinz Schumann	West Germany	21.0	Q
2	Csaba Csutorás	Hungary	21.1	Q
3	Armando Sardi	Italy	21.6	Q
4	Josef Trousil	Czechoslovakia	21.7	
			Wind: +0.9 m/s	

==== Heat 6 ====
Rank	Name	Nationality	Time	Notes
1	Andrzej Zieliński	Poland	21.2	Q
2	Vilém Mandlík	Czechoslovakia	21.3	Q
3	László Mihályfi	Hungary	21.3	Q
4	Carl Fredrik Bunæs	Norway	21.4	
5	Heinz-Georg Kamler	Austria	21.7	
6	Ferruh Oygur	Turkey	22.1	
			Wind: +2.3 m/s	

=== Semi-finals ===
15 September

==== Heat 1 ====
Rank	Name	Nationality	Time	Notes
1	Owe Jonsson	Sweden	21.0	Q
2	Heinz Schumann	West Germany	21.2	Q
3	Vilém Mandlík	Czechoslovakia	21.5	
4	Paul Genevay	France	21.7	
5	Michael Hildrey	Great Britain	21.8	
6	Valeriu Jurcă	Romania	22.1	
			Wind: -3.1 m/s	

==== Heat 2 ====
Rank	Name	Nationality	Time	Notes
1	Marian Foik	Poland	21.1	Q
2	David Jones	Great Britain	21.4	Q
3	Klaus Ulonska	West Germany	21.5	
4	Csaba Csutorás	Hungary	21.5	
5	Armando Sardi	Italy	21.9	
	László Mihályfi	Hungary	DNF	
			Wind: -3.1 m/s	

==== Heat 3 ====
Rank	Name	Nationality	Time	Notes
1	Sergio Ottolina	Italy	21.0	Q
2	Jocelyn Delecour	France	21.0	Q
3	Manfred Germar	West Germany	21.3	
4	Andrzej Zieliński	Poland	21.5	
5	Edvin Ozolin	Soviet Union	21.5	
6	Peter Radford	Great Britain	21.6	
			Wind: -2.8 m/s	

=== Final ===
16 September

Rank	Name	Nationality	Time	Notes
1st place, gold medalist(s)	Owe Jonsson	Sweden	20.7	CR
2nd place, silver medalist(s)	Marian Foik	Poland	20.8	
3rd place, bronze medalist(s)	Sergio Ottolina	Italy	20.8	
4	Jocelyn Delecour	France	21.0	
5	David Jones	Great Britain	21.0	
6	Heinz Schumann	West Germany	21.2	
			Wind: 0.0 m/s	
