= Athletics at the 1964 Summer Olympics – Men's 100 metres =

Men's 100 metres at the Games of the XVIII Olympiad
- Venue: Olympic Stadium; Tokyo, Japan
- Dates: 14 October 1964 (heats, quarterfinals); 15 October 1964 (semifinals, finals)
- Competitors: 73 from 49 nations
- Winning time: 10.0 seconds

Medalists
| 1st place, gold medalist(s) | | Bob Hayes | United States |
| 2nd place, silver medalist(s) | | Enrique Figuerola | Cuba |
| 3rd place, bronze medalist(s) | | Harry Jerome | Canada |

Official Video Highlights

The men's 100 metres was the shortest of the men's track races in the Athletics at the 1964 Summer Olympics program in Tokyo, Japan. It was held at the Olympic Stadium on 14 and 15 October 1964. 76 athletes from 49 nations entered, with three not starting in the first round. Nations were limited to three athletes each, per rules in force since the 1930 Olympic Congress. The first two rounds were held on Wednesday, 14 October, with the semifinals and final on the following day.

In the final, American Bob Hayes tied the world record of 10.0 seconds and won the gold medal. Enrique Figuerola of Cuba and Harry Jerome of Canada tied the previous Olympic record time (10.2 seconds). It was Cuba's first medal in the event; Canada earned its first men's 100 metres medal since 1928.

== Background ==
This was the fifteenth time the event was held, having appeared at every Olympics since the first in 1896. Neither of the top two runners from 1960 returned, but Rome bronze medalist Brit Peter Radford and fourth-place finisher Cuban Enrique Figuerola did. Other notable entrants were American Bob Hayes (the favorite who was unbeaten in the event, including the 100 yards variant, since 1962) and Canadian Harry Jerome (a 1960 semifinalist who held a share of the world record). A muscle strain prevented Venezuelan Horacio Esteves (another 1960 semifinalist with a share of the world record) from competing.

Cameroon, the Republic of the Congo, the Dominican Republic, Iran, the Ivory Coast, Madagascar, Mali, Northern Rhodesia, Rhodesia, Senegal, and Vietnam were represented in the event for the first time. The new federation of Malaysia also competed for the first time, though both Malaya and Singapore had previously appeared. The United States was the only nation to have appeared at each of the first fifteen Olympic men's 100 metres events.

== Competition format ==
The event retained the same basic four round format from 1920–1960: heats, quarterfinals, semifinals, and a final. However, after an extremely static format from 1936 to 1956, the format was modified for a second time in 1964 after 1960's tweaks. The changes generally increased the number of athletes in each race; for the first time in Olympic men's 100 metres history, 8 runners competed at a time.

| | | 1936–56 | 1960 | 1964 |
|---|---|---|---|---|
| Heats | Number of heats | 12 | 9 | 10 |
| Heats | Athletes per heat | Up to 7 | 6–7 | 7–8 |
| Heats | Qualifiers per heat | 2 | 3 | 3 |
| Quarterfinals | Number of heats | 4 | 4 | 4 |
| Quarterfinals | Athletes per heat | 6 | 6–7 | 7–8 |
| Quarterfinals | Qualifiers per heat | 3 | 3 | 4 |
| Semifinals | Number of heats | 2 | 2 | 2 |
| Semifinals | Athletes per heat | 6 | 6 | 8 |
| Semifinals | Qualifiers per heat | 3 | 3 | 4 |
| Finals | Number of heats | 1 | 1 | 1 |
| Finals | Athletes per heat | 6 | 6 | 8 |

== Records ==
Prior to the competition, the existing World and Olympic records were as follows.

| World record | 10.0 | (Germany) Armin Hary | Zürich, Switzerland | 21 June 1960 |
| World record | 10.0 | (Canada) Harry Jerome | Saskatoon, Canada | 15 July 1960 |
| World record | 10.0 | (Venezuela) Horacio Esteves | Caracas, Venezuela | 15 August 1964 |
| Olympic record | 10.2 | (Germany) Armin Hary | Rome, Italy | 31 August 1960 |
| Olympic record | 10.3 | (Germany) Armin Hary | Rome, Italy | 31 August 1960 |
| Olympic record | 10.3 | (United States) Dave Sime | Rome, Italy | 31 August 1960 |

Bob Hayes had an official time of 10.0 seconds in the final, breaking the Olympic record by 0.2 seconds and matching the world record. His official time of 9.9 seconds in the semifinals did not count for records purposes because of wind assistance.

== Results ==
=== First round ===
The top three runners in each of the 10 heats advanced. The Official Report describes the weather for these heats as 'rainy'. The wind varied widely, between a 2.85 m/s headwind (in heat 3) and a 1.60 m/s tailwind (in heat 6).

==== Heat 1 ====
Wind: +0.6 m/s

| Rank | Athlete | Nation | Time (hand) | Time (automatic) | Notes |
|---|---|---|---|---|---|
| 1 | Hideo Iijima | Japan | 10.3 | 10.40 | Q |
| 2 | Bernard Laidebeur | France | 10.5 | 10.51 | Q |
| 3 | Edvin Ozolin | Soviet Union | 10.5 | 10.52 | Q |
| 4 | Kenneth Powell | India | 10.7 | 10.74 | |
| 5 | Zbigniew Syka | Poland | 10.7 | 10.79 | |
| 6 | Jean-Louis Ravelomanantsoa | Madagascar | 10.8 | 10.89 | |
| 7 | Sara Camara | Mali | 11.3 | – | |

==== Heat 2 ====
Wind: -2.5 m/s

| Rank | Athlete | Nation | Time (hand) | Time (automatic) | Notes |
|---|---|---|---|---|---|
| 1 | Trenton Jackson | United States | 10.5 | 10.53 | Q |
| 2 | Peter Radford | Great Britain | 10.6 | 10.69 | Q |
| 3 | B. El Maachi Bouchaib | Morocco | 10.6 | 10.70 | Q |
| 4 | Csaba Csutorás | Hungary | 10.7 | 10.72 | |
| 5 | Johan Du Preez | Rhodesia | 10.7 | 10.79 | |
| 6 | Jeong Gi-seon | South Korea | 11.0 | 11.08 | |
| 7 | Arnulfo Valles | Philippines | 11.1 | 11.21 | |

==== Heat 3 ====
Wind: -2.8 m/s

| Rank | Athlete | Nation | Time (hand) | Time (automatic) | Notes |
|---|---|---|---|---|---|
| 1 | Gaoussou Koné | Ivory Coast | 10.5 | 10.50 | Q |
| 2 | Mel Pender | United States | 10.5 | 10.53 | Q |
| 3 | Michael Ahey | Ghana | 10.6 | 10.61 | Q |
| 4 | Franciscus Luitjes | Netherlands | 10.6 | 10.69 | |
| 5 | Wilton Jackson | Trinidad and Tobago | 10.6 | 10.70 | |
| 6 | Lynn Davies | Great Britain | 10.7 | 10.78 | |
| 7 | Gerardo di Tolla | Peru | 10.9 | 10.99 | |
| 8 | Lee Ar-tu | Taiwan | 11.2 | – | |

==== Heat 4 ====
Wind: -0.7 m/s

| Rank | Athlete | Nation | Time (hand) | Time (automatic) | Notes |
|---|---|---|---|---|---|
| 1 | Marian Dudziak | Poland | 10.6 | 10.60 | Q |
| 2 | Stanley Fabian Allotey | Ghana | 10.6 | 10.62 | Q |
| 3 | John Owiti | Kenya | 10.6 | 10.64 | Q |
| 4 | Carlos Lorenzo | Mexico | 10.7 | 10.74 | |
| 5 | George Collie | Bahamas | 10.9 | 10.90 | |
| 6 | Masaru Kamata | Japan | 10.9 | 10.94 | |
| 7 | Ho Thành Chinh | Vietnam | 11.9 | – | |
| — | Nikolay Politiko | Soviet Union | DNS | – | |

==== Heat 5 ====
Wind: +0.3 m/s

| Rank | Athlete | Nation | Time (hand) | Time (automatic) | Notes |
|---|---|---|---|---|---|
| 1 | Harry Jerome | Canada | 10.5 | 10.51 | Q |
| 2 | Claude Piquemal | France | 10.5 | 10.58 | Q |
| 3 | Lloyd Murad | Venezuela | 10.8 | 10.86 | Q |
| 4 | James Odongo | Uganda | 10.9 | 10.91 | |
| 5 | Gusman Kosanov | Soviet Union | 10.9 | 10.94 | |
| 6 | Abdoulaye N'Diaye | Senegal | 11.0 | 11.06 | |
| 7 | Levi Psavkin | Israel | 11.1 | 11.13 | |

==== Heat 6 ====
Wind: +1.6 m/s

| Rank | Athlete | Nation | Time (hand) | Time (automatic) | Notes |
|---|---|---|---|---|---|
| 1 | Heinz Schumann | United Team of Germany | 10.5 | 10.52 | Q |
| 2 | Dennis O. Johnson | Jamaica | 10.6 | 10.61 | Q |
| 3 | William Earle | Australia | 10.7 | 10.79 | Q |
| 4 | Serafino Antao | Kenya | 10.7 | 10.79 | |
| 5 | Huba Rozsnyai | Hungary | 10.8 | 10.84 | |
| 6 | Alf Meakin | Great Britain | 10.8 | 10.91 | |
| 7 | David Njitock | Cameroon | 11.1 | 11.13 | |
| 8 | Akbar Babakhanloo | Iran | 11.1 | 11.14 | |

==== Heat 7 ====
Wind: -1.8 m/s

| Rank | Athlete | Nation | Time (hand) | Time (automatic) | Notes |
|---|---|---|---|---|---|
| 1 | Wiesław Maniak | Poland | 10.5 | 10.57 | Q |
| 2 | Arquímedes Herrera | Venezuela | 10.5 | 10.59 | Q |
| 3 | Mani Jegathesan | Malaysia | 10.6 | 10.60 | Q |
| 4 | José de Rocha | Portugal | 11.0 | 11.02 | |
| 5 | Bassirou Doumbia | Senegal | 11.0 | 11.02 | |
| 6 | Francisco Gutiérrez | Colombia | 11.0 | 11.03 | |
| 7 | Iftikhar Shah | Pakistan | 11.4 | 11.49 | |

==== Heat 8 ====
Wind: +0.2 m/s

| Rank | Athlete | Nation | Time (hand) | Time (automatic) | Notes |
|---|---|---|---|---|---|
| 1 | Bob Hayes | United States | 10.4 | 10.41 | Q |
| 2 | Tom Robinson | Bahamas | 10.5 | 10.50 | Q |
| 3 | Bob Lay | Australia | 10.5 | 10.53 | Q |
| 4 | Ito Jiani | Italy | 10.6 | 10.69 | |
| 5 | Rogelio Onofre | Philippines | 10.7 | 10.78 | |
| 6 | Khudher Zalada | Iraq | 11.1 | 11.17 | |
| — | David Ejoke | Nigeria | DNS | – | |

==== Heat 9 ====
Wind: +0.2 m/s

| Rank | Athlete | Nation | Time (hand) | Time (automatic) | Notes |
|---|---|---|---|---|---|
| 1 | Fritz Obersiebrasse | United Team of Germany | 10.4 | 10.47 | Q |
| 2 | Iván Moreno | Chile | 10.5 | 10.59 | Q |
| 3 | Pablo McNeil | Jamaica | 10.5 | 10.60 | Q |
| 4 | László Mihályfi | Hungary | 10.6 | 10.65 | |
| 5 | Gary Holdsworth | Australia | 10.6 | 10.69 | |
| 6 | Max Barandun | Switzerland | 10.7 | 10.79 | |
| 7 | Jeffery Smith | Northern Rhodesia | 10.8 | 10.86 | |
| – | Wesley Johnson | Liberia | DNF | – | |

==== Heat 10 ====
Wind: -0.5 m/s

| Rank | Athlete | Nation | Time (hand) | Time (automatic) | Notes |
|---|---|---|---|---|---|
| 1 | Enrique Figuerola | Cuba | 10.5 | 10.50 | Q |
| 2 | Lynn Headley | Jamaica | 10.5 | 10.57 | Q |
| 3 | Roger Bambuck | France | 10.6 | 10.62 | Q |
| 4 | Manfred Knickenberg | United Team of Germany | 10.7 | 10.74 | |
| 5 | Léon Yombe | Republic of the Congo | 10.8 | 10.87 | |
| 6 | Alberto Torres | Dominican Republic | 10.9 | 10.93 | |
| 7 | Suthi Manyakass | Thailand | 10.9 | 10.98 | |
| 8 | Rogelio Rivas | Spain | 11.1 | 11.12 | |

=== Quarterfinals ===
The top four runners in each of the four second round heats advanced to the semifinals. The weather was cloudy and winds were tailwinds throughout.

==== Quarterfinal 1 ====
Wind: +1.9 m/s

| Rank | Athlete | Nation | Time (hand) | Time (automatic) | Notes |
|---|---|---|---|---|---|
| 1 | Harry Jerome | Canada | 10.3 | 10.32 | Q |
| 2 | Trenton Jackson | United States | 10.4 | 10.41 | Q |
| 3 | Fritz Obersiebrasse | United Team of Germany | 10.4 | 10.44 | Q |
| 4 | Gaoussou Koné | Ivory Coast | 10.4 | 10.45 | Q |
| 5 | Dennis O. Johnson | Jamaica | 10.5 | 10.51 | |
| 6 | Marian Dudziak | Poland | 10.5 | 10.52 | |
| 7 | Bernard Laidebeur | France | 10.5 | 10.59 | |
| 8 | William Joseph Earle | Australia | 10.6 | 10.60 | |

==== Quarterfinal 2 ====
Wind: +1.7 m/s

| Rank | Athlete | Nation | Time (hand) | Time (automatic) | Notes |
|---|---|---|---|---|---|
| 1 | Enrique Figuerola | Cuba | 10.3 | 10.31 | Q |
| 2 | Wiesław Maniak | Poland | 10.3 | 10.35 | Q |
| 3 | Bob Lay | Australia | 10.4 | 10.42 | Q |
| 4 | Claude Piquemal | France | 10.4 | 10.48 | Q |
| 5 | Edvin Ozolin | Soviet Union | 10.4 | 10.48 | |
| 6 | B. El Maachi Bouchaib | Morocco | 10.5 | 10.57 | |
| 7 | John Owiti | Kenya | 10.6 | 10.64 | |

==== Quarterfinal 3 ====
Wind: +1.0 m/s

| Rank | Athlete | Nation | Time (hand) | Time (automatic) | Notes |
|---|---|---|---|---|---|
| 1 | Tom Robinson | Bahamas | 10.3 | 10.38 | Q |
| 2 | Mel Pender | United States | 10.4 | 10.44 | Q |
| 3 | Iijima Hideo | Japan | 10.5 | 10.50 | Q |
| 4 | Pablo McNeil | Jamaica | 10.5 | 10.54 | Q |
| 5 | Mani Jegathesan | Malaysia | 10.6 | 10.62 | |
| 6 | Iván Moreno | Chile | 10.6 | 10.69 | |
| 7 | Stanley Fabian Allotey | Ghana | 10.7 | 10.73 | |
| 8 | Lloyd Murad | Venezuela | 10.7 | 10.77 | |

==== Quarterfinal 4 ====
Wind: +1.7 m/s

| Rank | Athlete | Nation | Time (hand) | Time (automatic) | Notes |
|---|---|---|---|---|---|
| 1 | Bob Hayes | United States | 10.3 | 10.37 | Q |
| 2 | Arquimedes Herrera | Venezuela | 10.4 | 10.43 | Q |
| 3 | Lynn Headley | Jamaica | 10.4 | 10.50 | Q |
| 4 | Heinz Schumann | United Team of Germany | 10.5 | 10.55 | Q |
| 5 | Peter Radford | Great Britain | 10.5 | 10.59 | |
| 6 | Roger Bambuck | France | 10.5 | 10.60 | |
| 7 | Michael Ahey | Ghana | 10.6 | 10.67 | |

=== Semifinals ===
The top four runners in each of the two semifinals advanced to the final. The weather was described as "fine," with lower humidity than the first two rounds and a temperature of 23.8 degrees Celsius. There was a strong tailwind for the first semifinal and a moderate headwind for the second.

==== Semifinal 1 ====
The tailwind speed of 5.28 m/s meant this semifinal was ineligible for record purposes.

| Rank | Athlete | Nation | Time (hand) | Time (automatic) | Notes |
|---|---|---|---|---|---|
| 1 | Bob Hayes | United States | 9.9 | 9.91 | Q |
| 2 | Wiesław Maniak | Poland | 10.1 | 10.15 | Q |
| 3 | Tom Robinson | Bahamas | 10.2 | 10.22 | Q |
| 4 | Heinz Schumann | United Team of Germany | 10.3 | 10.30 | Q |
| 5 | Robert William Lay | Australia | 10.3 | 10.35 | |
| 6 | Pablo McNeil | Jamaica | 10.3 | 10.39 | |
| 7 | Arquimedes Herrera | Venezuela | 10.4 | 10.42 | |
| 8 | Trenton Jackson | United States | 10.6 | 10.66 | |

==== Semifinal 2 ====
Wind: -1.3 m/s

| Rank | Athlete | Nation | Time (hand) | Time (automatic) | Notes |
|---|---|---|---|---|---|
| 1 | Harry Jerome | Canada | 10.3 | 10.37 | Q |
| 2 | Gaoussou Koné | Ivory Coast | 10.4 | 10.48 | Q |
| 3 | Enrique Figuerola | Cuba | 10.4 | 10.48 | Q |
| 4 | Mel Pender | United States | 10.4 | 10.49 | Q |
| 5 | Claude Piquemal | France | 10.5 | 10.56 | |
| 6 | Lynn Headley | Jamaica | 10.5 | 10.59 | |
| 7 | Iijima Hideo | Japan | 10.6 | 10.63 | |
| 8 | Fritz Obersiebrasse | United Team of Germany | 10.6 | 10.68 | |

=== Final ===
Until the Tokyo Olympics world records were measured by officials with stopwatches, measured to the nearest tenth of a second. Although fully automatic timing was used in Tokyo, the times were given the appearance of manual timing. This was done by subtracting 0.05 seconds from the automatic time and rounding to the nearest tenth of a second, making Hayes' time of 10.06 seconds convert to 10.0 seconds (a new Olympic record and matching the existing world record), despite the fact that the officials with stopwatches had measured Hayes' time to be 9.9 seconds, and the average difference between manual and automatic times was typically 0.15 to 0.20 seconds. This unique method of determining the official time therefore denied Hayes the record of being the first to officially record 9.9 seconds for the 100 meters. The first official times of 9.9 seconds were recorded at the "Night of Speed" in 1968.

The final was run in "fine" weather, with a tailwind of just over a metre per second. Hayes ran on lane one, which had been damaged by competitors in the men's 10,000 metres and the men's 20 km walk. Nevertheless, his "margin of victory was described by Track & Field News as 'insulting to an Olympic final field.'"

Wind: +1.0 m/s

| Rank | Athlete | Nation | Time (hand) | Time (automatic) | Notes |
|---|---|---|---|---|---|
| 1st place, gold medalist(s) | Bob Hayes | United States | 10.0 | 10.06 | =WR |
| 2nd place, silver medalist(s) | Enrique Figuerola | Cuba | 10.2 | 10.25 | |
| 3rd place, bronze medalist(s) | Harry Jerome | Canada | 10.2 | 10.27 | |
| 4 | Wiesław Maniak | Poland | 10.4 | 10.42 | |
| 5 | Heinz Schumann | United Team of Germany | 10.4 | 10.46 | |
| 6 | Gaoussou Koné | Ivory Coast | 10.4 | 10.47 | |
| 6 | Mel Pender | United States | 10.4 | 10.47 | |
| 8 | Tom Robinson | Bahamas | 10.5 | 10.57 | |

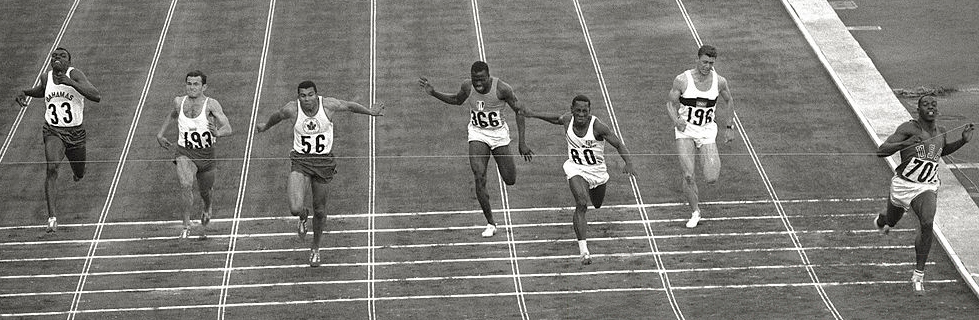
The 100 m final. Left-right: Tom Robinson, Wiesław Maniak, Harry Jerome, Gaoussou Koné, Enrique Figuerola, Heinz Schumann, Bob Hayes
