= Abdoulaye Ndiaye =

Abdoulaye Ndiaye may refer to:

- Abdoulaye Ndiaye (businessman)
- Abdoulaye Ndiaye (footballer)
- Abdoulaye N'Diaye, Senegalese sprinter
