= Vahab =

Vahab or Vehab is both a given name and a surname. Notable people with the name include:

- Amir Vahab, Iranian Sufi musician and educator in Persian culture and traditional music
- Vahab Saalabi, Iranian paralympic athlete
- Vahab Shahkhordeh (born 1936), Iranian sprinter

== See also ==
- Vahabism, alternate expression for Wahhabism
