= Lazimi (disambiguation) =

Lazimi is a regular litany in Sufism.

Lazimi or Lazim may also refer to:

- Haji Mohd Lazim Bridge, a river bridge in Malaysia.
- Khalid Tawfik Lazim, an Iraqi sprinter.
