= Gerry Ashworth =

American sprinter (born 1942)

Personal information
- Full name: Gerald Howard Ashworth
- Born: May 1, 1942 (age 84) Haverhill, Massachusetts, U.S.
- Education: Dartmouth College 1963, Harvard Business School
- Height: 180 cm (5 ft 11 in)
- Weight: 75 kg (165 lb)
- Spouse: Jeanne Leslie Oshry
- Children: 2

Sport
- Club: Southern California Striders (Anaheim)
- Coached by: Elliot Noyes (Dartmouth)

Achievements and titles
- Personal bests: 100 y – 9.4 s (1962); 100 m – 10.3 s (1964); 220 y – 21.2 s (1964).
Medal record
Men's athletics
Representing the United States
Olympic Games
Gold medal – first place	1964 Tokyo	4 × 100 m relay
Maccabiah Games
Gold medal – first place	1965 Tel Aviv	100 m
Gold medal – first place	1965 Tel Aviv	4 × 100 m relay

Gerald Howard "Gerry" Ashworth (born May 1, 1942 in Haverhill, Massachusetts to Earl Ashworth) is an American former track athlete and a gold medalist in the 4 × 100 meter relay in the 1964 Tokyo Olympics. He won two gold medals sprinting in the 1964 Maccabiah Games in Tel Aviv, Israel. Recognized internationally, in 1963 Ashworth was rated seventh in the World in indoor competition and in 1964 had an eighth world rating in the outdoor 100 Yards and 100 Meters distances.

Gerry was born one of three children on May 1, 1942, to Gladys Brown Ashforth and Earl Ashforth in Haverhill, Massachusetts. His father, who was originally from nearby Lawrence, was a manufacturer for shoe products, and after purchasing his first shoe company in Maine at age 20, he eventually owned a number of shoe manufacturing companies operating in Massachusetts, Maine, and Vermont. Active in the community, Earl had been a President of Temple Emmanuel in Haverhill, and the Haverhill Country Club, before retiring to Sarasota, Florida with his wife Gladys in 1974. In 1964, the couple donated the first electronic timing device ever used at Dartmouth's Leverone Field House, which electronically displayed both scores and electronic times to spectators.

== Early track career ==
Ashworth began his track career as a Freshman at Haverhill High School under Coach Charlie White, and then around his junior year transferred to the Holderness School in Plymouth N.H., a private college preparatory school where he acquired the academic skills required for the challenges of Dartmouth College which he would attend after graduation. While competing in High School Track, he ran a noteworthy 9.9 seconds in the 100-yard dash, but the North's cold weather may have kept him from competing with the nation's best, and from being noticed by top track schools outside the Northeast.

=== Dartmouth track highlights ===
At Dartmouth, he studied Engineering Science and Economics, and was a member of Phi Delta Alpha fraternity. Setting records early, in 1961, he tied the World record in the 60-Yard Dash with a time of 6.1 seconds. Not yet his fastest, in 1962, he broke the school record at the Dartmouth track for the 50-yard dash with a time of 5.3 seconds. On April 22, 1962, as a Junior, he broke the Dartmouth record for the 220 yard dash with a time of 21.2 seconds. When as a Junior at Dartmouth, he ran a winning 100-yard time of 9.4 seconds in the Ivy League Heptagonal Championships around May 12, 1962, the track community began to take notice, and at only 20, Ashworth looked to be one of the top competitors in the event in New England, with the fastest time in the Ivy League. The time became his personal best for the event. Subsequently, in the 200-meter at the Ivy League Heptagonals, Ashworth injured a left leg muscle, but with insight his coach remarked, "It doesn't necessarily mean he is through for the season...Ashworth hasn't reached his potential." With the guidance of Coach Elliot B. "Ellie" Noyes, who had headed Dartmouth track since 1945, Ashworth gained recognition as one of the country's top runners after winning the IC4A championship in the 100-yard dash. Injuries prevented him from competing in the NCAA outdoor championships as a junior.

Still plagued by occasional injury in his Senior year at Dartmouth, he was unable to compete in the National Championships but showing remarkable resilience, was nearly undefeated in both indoor and outdoor collegiate meets. Though suffering injuries that affected his performance, he competed and won races against top professionals in indoor meets at such venues as Madison Square Garden. In his final year at Dartmouth, he was elected Captain of the Track team. Not long after graduating Dartmouth in 1963, he was invited to join the Striders Running Club in the Los Angeles area, and he moved there to train with the club.

== Track career highlights ==
Ashworth is Jewish. He set the World record for the 100 Yard dash, 9.4 s, in 1962, and showing consistency, matched his record again in 1964 after graduating Dartmouth.

In the 1963 Pan American Games, he was an alternate in the relay but did not get the opportunity to compete, and a few press accounts considered him inexperienced in relay competitions. An injury while running in Brazil may also have hampered his chances of participating in the Games as a relay member. His performance in the Olympics indicated he could learn to run relays effectively without years of training.

=== 1964 Olympic qualifiers ===
Ashforth claimed he qualified initially for the 1964 Olympic rundown at New Jersey's Rutger's Stadium, and was second running the semi-finals at New York's Randall Island, which qualified him to attend the final Olympic qualifiers in Los Angeles. He disliked his start in the final qualifiers in Los Angeles in September, 1964, but with an incredible effort, he claimed to run the race of his life, and his time of 10.4 s, ranked him fourth in the 100-meter event which won him a place on the American 4 × 100 relay team at Tokyo. Bob Hayes's qualifying time was 10.1 s to tie the American record. Trent Jackson qualified with a second place 10.2 seconds, but he was later cut from the relay due to an injury while running a race in Tokyo on October 15, only a week before the relay finals, cementing Ashforth's place on the 4 × 100 m relay team.

== 1964 Olympic gold medal, 4 × 100 m relay ==
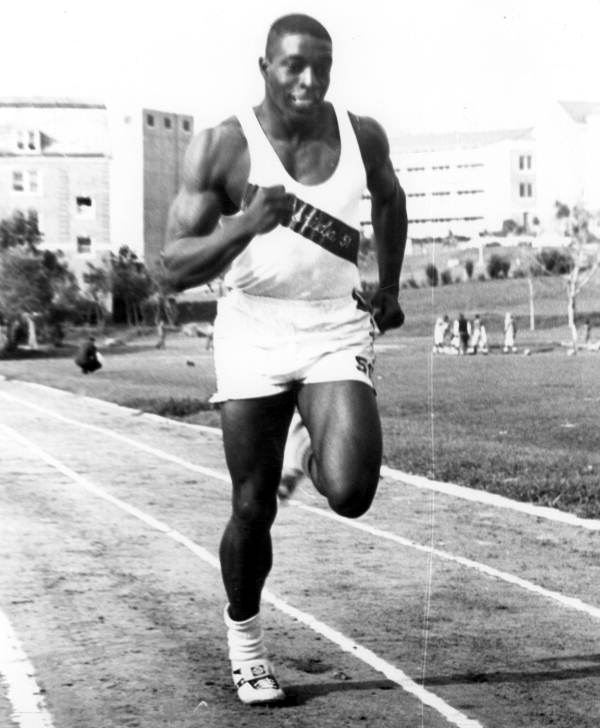
Hayes, 1962

In his most noteworthy career accomplishment, he ran the second leg of the gold medal performance of the American 4 × 100 m relay team at the Tokyo Olympics, on October 21, 1964, setting a new world record of 39.06. Paul Drayton, Richard Stebbins and Bob Hayes ran the other legs. After receiving his handoff from the starter Drayton, Ashworth's performance in the straightaway was adequate but his exchange to Stebbins was less effective, and the Americans were not leading. Stebbins gave the baton to Hayes at the beginning of the handoff lane rather than near the end, requiring Hayes to run an additional ten meters. Hayes's speed was invaluable in leading the American team to the gold, taking the American relay team from around fifth to first place and securing the gold medal. Impressively, Hayes may have completed one of the top ten fastest Olympic relay times for an anchor leg, as it was hand-timed between 8.5 and 8.9 seconds, though the time never became official.

== 1965 Maccabiah Game gold medals ==
With a total 40,000 in attendance, Ashworth ran in the 1965 Maccabiah Games in Tel Aviv, Israel in late August, winning a gold medal in the 400 m relay, with a time of 42.4 seconds, shaving .6 of a second off the old record. Ashforth also won the 100-meter dash in 10.6 seconds, taking a gold and beating Raoul Solomon of France by three feet. The Americans took 75 gold medals, the most of any country, with Israel second at 31 golds.

=== Life after track ===
Ashworth was a 1963 graduate of Dartmouth College. He later earned an MBA from Harvard Business School. Not long after the Maccabiah Games, he married Jeanne Leslie Oshry at Boston's Hotel Somerset in August 1965, before moving to Cambridge, where his wife would teach school in Boston and he would begin his studies at Harvard Business School.

Using his education in engineering science and business management, he served as President of General Metals and Smelting, in Andover, Massachusetts, which specialized in scrap metal, commodity brokering, lead casting, and long-distance trucking. Andover was not far from his former home in Haverhill. He had two sons with wife Jeanne, and enjoyed summering in Maine. In 2004, he and his wife were residents of York, Maine, and he attended an event to support a track race in nearby Portland, Maine in 2015.

== See also ==
- List of notable Jewish track and field athletes
