= Juskowiak =

Juskowiak is a Polish surname. Notable people with the surname include:

- Andrzej Juskowiak (born 1970), Polish footballer
- Erich Juskowiak (1926–1983), German footballer
- Jerzy Juskowiak (1939–1993), Polish sprinter
