= William Earle =

William Earle may refer to:

- Bill Earle (1911–1983), Australian rules footballer
- Billy Earle (1867–1946), American baseball player
- William A. Earle (1919–1988), American philosopher
- William Earle (athlete) (born 1941), Australian sprinter
- William Earle (shipping), engineer and one of the founders in 1845 of Earle's Shipbuilding in Kingston upon Hull, England
- William Earle (USS Merrimac), Acting Master of the US Civil War steamer USS Merrimac when it sank on February 15, 1865
- William Earle, fictional character from the 2005 film Batman Begins
- Major General William Earle (soldier) (1833–1885), British Commander at the Battle of Kirbekan
- William Rawlinson Earle (c. 1703–1774), British Member of Parliament for Cricklade, Malmesbury and Newport, Isle of Wight
- William Earle (MP) (1728–1774), British Member of Parliament for Cricklade
- William Earle (Newfoundland politician) (1884–1968), Newfoundland politician
- William Benson Earle (1740–1796), English philanthropist
- William P. S. Earle (1882–1972), American film director
- William Earle (slave trader), 18th century slave trader

== See also ==
- Bill Earley (born 1956), American baseball pitcher
