= David Njitock =

Cameroonian sprinter (born 1942

Personal information
- Nationality: Cameroonian
- Born: 17 June 1942 (age 84)

Sport
- Sport: Sprinting
- Events: 100 metres, 200 metres

David Njitock (born 17 June 1942), also spelled as David Njitok, is a Cameroonian sprinter. He was selected be the sole Cameroonian athlete to compete at the 1964 Summer Olympics, which would be the first appearance of the nation at an Olympic Games. Njitock was the first Cameroonian Olympian.

He competed in the heats of the men's 100 metres and men's 200 metres. He placed sixth in the heats of the former while fifth in the latter, not advancing to the finals. He did not medal though he later broke his personal bests in the event some time after the Summer Games.

== Biography ==
David Njitock was born on 17 June 1942. He was selected to compete for Cameroon at the 1964 Summer Olympics in Tokyo, Japan. It would be the nation's first appearance at an Olympic Games, making Njitock the first Cameroonian athlete to compete at an Olympic Games.

Njitock first competed in the heats of the men's 100 metres on 14 October. He raced against seven other athletes in the sixth heat. He ran in a time of 11.1 seconds and placed sixth; he did not advance to the final. The eventual winner of the event on the following day was Bob Hayes of the United States. During an interview after his race, he remained positive: "Just to compete in the Olympic Games was the thing from my point of view."

He then competed in the heats of the men's 200 metres two days later. He raced against seven other athletes in the third heat. He ran in a time of 22.5 seconds and placed fifth; he did not advance to the final. The eventual winner of the event on the following day was Henry Carr of the United States. Some time after the 1964 Summer Games, he broke his personal best in the 200 metres with a time of 21.8 seconds. Two years later, he broke his personal best in the 100 metres with a time of 10.6 seconds.
