= Chalit Kanitasut =

Thai sprinter

Personal information
- Nationality: Thai
- Born: 5 December 1940 (age 85)

Sport
- Sport: Sprinting
- Event: 4 × 100 metres relay

Chalit Kanitasut (born 5 December 1940) is a Thai sprinter. He competed in the men's 4 × 100 metres relay at the 1964 Summer Olympics.
