= Miguel Ebreo =

Filipino sprinter

Personal information
- Nationality: Filipino
- Born: November 21, 1939 (age 86)
- Height: 5 ft 9 in (175 cm)
- Weight: 126 lb (57 kg)

Sport
- Sport: Sprinting
- Event: 4 × 100 metres relay

Miguel I. Ebreo (born November 21, 1939) is a Filipino sprinter. He competed in the men's 4 × 100 metres relay at the 1964 Summer Olympics.
