= Lawrence Okoroafor =

Nigerian sprinter

Personal information
- Nationality: Nigerian
- Born: 10 January 1939 (age 87)

Sport
- Sport: Sprinting
- Event: 4 × 100 metres relay

Lawrence Okoroafor (born 10 January 1939) is a Nigerian sprinter. He competed in the men's 4 × 100 metres relay at the 1964 Summer Olympics.
