= Sedili Besar River =

River of Johor, Malaysia

Coordinates: 1°55′N 104°07′E

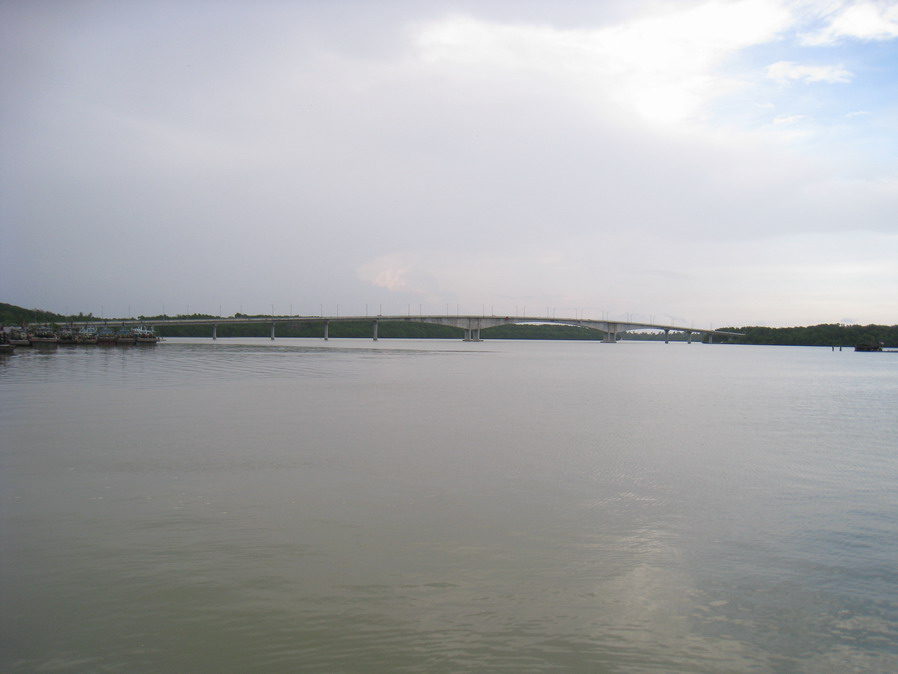
- Native name: Sungai Sedili Besar (Malay)

Location
- Country: Malaysia
- State: Johor
- District: Kota Tinggi

Physical characteristics
- Mouth: Teluk Mahkota
  - location: Kota Tinggi District
- Basin size: 271 km^{2}
- Discharge
  - location: Teluk Mahkota

Basin features
- Bridges: Haji Mohd Lazim Bridge

The Sedili Besar River (Malay: Sungai Sedili Besar) is a river in Kota Tinggi District, Johor, Malaysia.

== Name ==
The word besar means large. At the southern end of Teluk Mahkota bay is a smaller river known as Sungai Sedili Kechil. The word kechil means small in Malay language.

== Geology ==
The river mouth is situated at the northern end of Teluk Mahkota bay, and empties into the South China Sea. The river has a total drainage basin area of 271 km^{2}.

== Bridges ==
- Haji Mohd Lazim Bridge

== See also ==
- Geography of Malaysia
