= Sara Camara =

Malian sprinter (born 1940)

Sara Camara (born 18 June 1940) is an athlete from Mali

He started at the Summer Olympics 1964 in Tokyo in Men's 100 metres. He finished seventh and last in his heat in the first round.
