= John Daukom =

Malaysian sprinter

Personal information
- Nationality: Malaysian
- Born: 1937
- Died: 28 September 2010 (aged 72–73)

Sport
- Sport: Sprinting
- Event: 4 × 100 metres relay

John Daukom (1937 – 28 September 2010) was a Malaysian sprinter. He competed in the men's 4 × 100 metres relay at the 1964 Summer Olympics. He was the first Murut person to compete at the Olympics.
