= Marian Foik =

Polish sprinter

Medal record

Men's athletics

Representing Poland

Olympic Games
Silver medal – second place	1964 Tokyo	4x100 metres relay

European Championships
Silver medal – second place	1962 Belgrade	200 m
Silver medal – second place	1962 Belgrade	4 x 100 m relay

Marian Foik (6 October 1933, in Bielszowice, now Ruda Śląska – 20 May 2005, in Warsaw) was a Polish athlete who mainly competed in the 100 metres.

He competed at the 1964 Summer Olympics held in Tokyo, Japan, participating in the 4 x 100 metre relay. With his teammates Andrzej Zieliński, Wiesław Maniak and Marian Dudziak, he won the silver medal.

== International competitions ==
Year	Competition	Venue	Position	Event	Notes
Representing Poland
1956	Olympic Games	Melbourne, Australia	7th (sf)	100 m	10.84
1956	Olympic Games	Melbourne, Australia	6th	4 × 100 m relay	40.75
1957	World Festival of Youth and Students	Moscow, Soviet Union	1st	100 m	10.5
1957	World Festival of Youth and Students	Moscow, Soviet Union	2nd	4 × 100 m relay	40.8
1958	European Championships	Stockholm, Sweden	6th	100 m	10.9
1958	European Championships	Stockholm, Sweden	7th (h)	4 × 100 m relay	41.3
1960	Olympic Games	Rome, Italy	9th (sf)	100 m	10.66
1960	Olympic Games	Rome, Italy	4th	200 m	20.90
1960	Olympic Games	Rome, Italy	– (h)	4 × 100 m relay	DQ
1962	European Championships	Belgrade, Yugoslavia	6th	100 m	10.5
1962	European Championships	Belgrade, Yugoslavia	2nd	200 m	20.8
1962	European Championships	Belgrade, Yugoslavia	2nd	4 × 100 m relay	39.5
1964	Olympic Games	Tokyo, Japan	6th	200 m	20.83
1964	Olympic Games	Tokyo, Japan	2nd	4 × 100 m relay	39.36

== Personal bests ==
- 100 metres – 10.2h (Szczecin 1961)
- 200 metres – 20.6h (Łódź 1960)
- 200 metres – 20.83 (Tokyo 1964)
- 400 metres – 48.9h (Warsaw 1963)
