= Volker Löffler =

German sprinter

Personal information
- Nationality: German
- Born: 27 June 1942 (age 84)

Sport
- Sport: Sprinting
- Event: 4 × 100 metres relay

Volker Löffler (born 27 June 1942) is a German sprinter. He competed in the men's 4 × 100 metres relay at the 1964 Summer Olympics.
