= Peter Gamper =

German sprinter

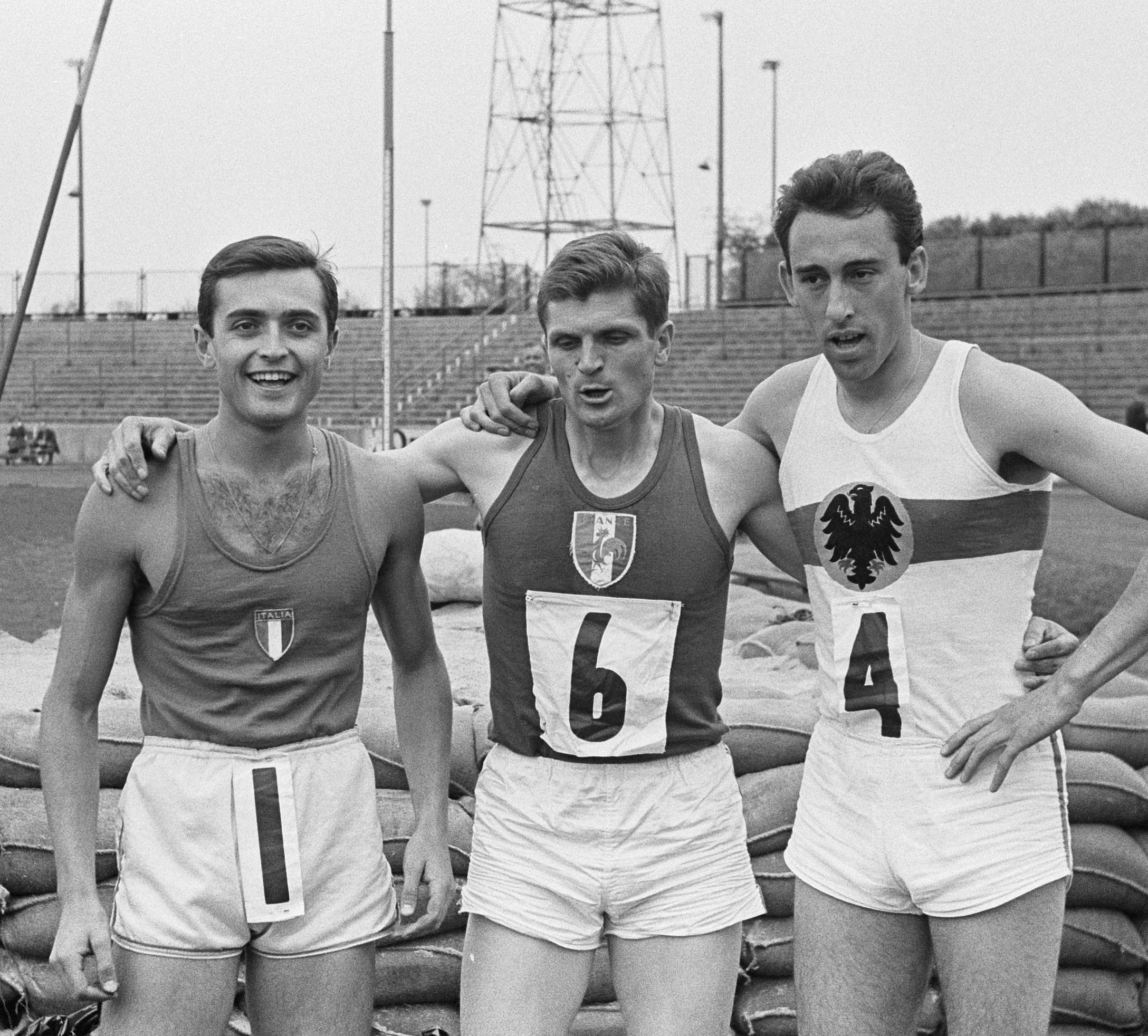
- Sergio Ottolina, Jocelyn Delecour and Peter Gamper in 1963

Personal information
- Born: 30 November 1940 (age 85) Ditzingen, Germany

Sport
- Sport: Sprint running
Medal record
Men's athletics
Representing West Germany
European Athletics Championships
| Gold medal – first place | 1962 Belgrade | 4×100 m |
| Bronze medal – third place | 1962 Belgrade | 100 m |

Peter Gamper (born 30 November 1940) is a retired German sprinter. He won a European title in the 4 × 100 m relay at the 1962 European Athletics Championships, together with Manfred Germar, Hans-Joachim Bender and Klaus Ulonska. Individually, he finished third in the 100 m, behind Claude Piquemal and Jocelyn Delecour.
