= Zbigniew Syka =

Polish sprinter

Personal information
- Full name: Zbigniew Stanisław Syka
- Nationality: Polish
- Born: 24 March 1936 Bydgoszcz, Poland
- Died: 2 August 1996 (aged 60) Bydgoszcz, Poland
- Height: 1.76 m (5 ft 9 in)
- Weight: 71 kg (157 lb)

Sport
- Sport: Sprinting
- Event: 100 metres
- Club: Pogoń Szczecin
Medal record
Men's athletics
Representing Poland
European Championships
| Silver medal – second place | 1962 Belgrade | 4×100 m |

Zbigniew Stanisław Syka (24 March 1936 – 2 August 1996) was a Polish sprinter. He competed in the men's 100 metres at the 1964 Summer Olympics.

== International competitions ==
| Year | Competition | Venue | Position | Event | Notes |
Representing Poland
| 1962 | European Championships | Belgrade, Yugoslavia | 2nd | 4 × 100 m relay | 39.5 |
| 1964 | Olympic Games | Tokyo, Japan | 40th (h) | 100 m | 10.79 |

== Personal bests ==
Outdoor

- 100 metres – 10.3h (Bydgoszcz 1963)
- 200 metres – 21.1h (Bydgoszcz 1963)
- 400 metres – 48.3h
