= Patrick Robinson (athlete) =

Jamaican sprinter

Personal information
- Nationality: Jamaican
- Born: 12 November 1943 (age 82)
- Height: 1.85 m (6 ft 1 in)
- Weight: 82 kg (181 lb)

Sport
- Sport: Sprinting
- Event: 100 metres
Medal record
Men's athletics
Representing Jamaica
Central American and Caribbean Games
Bronze medal – third place	1962 Kingston	4×100 m relay

Patrick Robinson (born 12 November 1943) is a retired Jamaican sprinter. He competed in the men's 4 × 100 metres relay at the 1964 Summer Olympics.

== International competitions ==
Year	Competition	Venue	Position	Event	Notes
Representing Jamaica
1962	Central American and Caribbean Games	Kingston, Jamaica	3rd	4 × 100 m relay	40.8
1964	Olympic Games	Tokyo, Japan	4th	4 × 100 m relay	39.4

== Personal bests ==
- 100 metres – 10.4h (1964)
