= Somsak Thongsuk =

Thai sprinter (born 1939)

Personal information
- Nationality: Thai
- Born: 9 January 1939 (age 87)

Sport
- Sport: Sprinting
- Event: 200 metres

Somsak Thongsuk (born 9 January 1939) is a Thai sprinter. He competed in the men's 200 metres at the 1964 Summer Olympics.
