= Andrzej Zieliński (athlete) =

Polish sprinter (1936–2021)

Medal record

Men's athletics

Representing Poland

Olympic Games
Silver medal – second place	1964 Tokyo	4 x 100 m relay

European Championships
Silver medal – second place	1962 Belgrade	4 x 100 m relay

Andrzej Franciszek Zieliński (20 August 1936 – 7 December 2021) was a Polish athlete who mainly competed in the 100 metres.

== Career ==
Zieliński was born in Warsaw, Poland, on 20 August 1936. He competed for Poland in the 4 x 100 metre relay at the 1964 Summer Olympics held in Tokyo, Japan, where he won the silver medal with his teammates Wiesław Maniak, Marian Foik and Marian Dudziak. Zieliński died on 7 December 2021, at the age of 85.

== International competitions ==
Year	Competition	Venue	Position	Event	Notes
Representing Poland
1958	European Championships	Stockholm, Sweden	7th (h)	4 × 100 m relay	41.3
1962	European Championships	Belgrade, Yugoslavia	14th (sf)	100 m	10.6
1962	European Championships	Belgrade, Yugoslavia	8th (sf)	200 m	21.5
1962	European Championships	Belgrade, Yugoslavia	2nd	4 × 100 m relay	39.5
1964	Olympic Games	Tokyo, Japan	20th (qf)	200 m	21.59
1964	Olympic Games	Tokyo, Japan	2nd	4 × 100 m relay	39.36
1965	European Cup Final	Stuttgart, West Germany	2nd	4 × 100 m relay	39.5

== Personal bests ==
- 100 metres – 10.2h (Prague 1962)
- 200 metres – 20.7h (Warsaw 1962)
