= Peter Wallach =

German sprinter

- Wallach in 1962

Personal information
- Nationality: German
- Born: 30 October 1938 (age 87)

Sport
- Sport: Sprinting
- Event: 4 × 100 metres relay

Peter Wallach (born 30 October 1938) is a German former sprinter. He competed in the men's 4 × 100 metres relay at the 1964 Summer Olympics.
