= Rajasekaran Pichaya =

Indian sprinter

Personal information
- Nationality: Indian
- Born: 3 January 1941 (age 85) Vaduvur, Tamil Nadu, India

Sport
- Sport: Sprinting
- Event: 4 × 100 metres relay

Rajasekaran Pichaya (born 3 January 1941) is an Indian sprinter. He competed in the men's 4 × 100 metres relay at the 1964 Summer Olympics.
