= Henry Carr =

American track and field athlete (1941–2015)

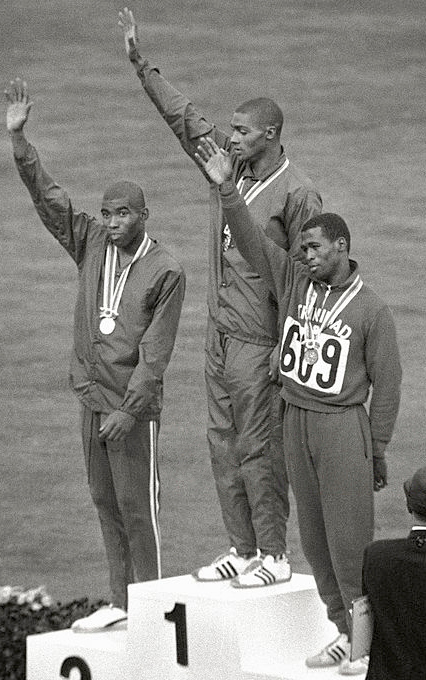
- Carr (center) at the 1964 Summer Olympics

Personal information
- Born: November 27, 1942 Montgomery, Alabama, U.S.
- Died: May 29, 2015 (aged 73) Griffin, Georgia, U.S.
- Height: 6 ft 3 in (1.91 m)
- Weight: 185 lb (84 kg)
- Football career

No. 28
- Position: Safety

Personal information
- Listed height: 6 ft 3 in (1.91 m)
- Listed weight: 190 lb (86 kg)

Career information
- College: Arizona State
- NFL draft: 1965: 4th round, 43rd overall pick
- AFL draft: 1965: 3rd round, 21st overall pick

Career history
- New York Giants (1965–1967)
- Stats at Pro Football Reference

Sport
- Sport: Sprint running
- Club: Phoenix Olympic Club

Achievements and titles
- Personal bests: 100 yd – 9.3 (1963); 100 m – 10.2 (1964); 200 m – 20.1 (1964); 400 – 45.4 (1963)
Medal record
Men's athletics
Representing the United States
Olympic Games
Gold medal – first place	1964 Tokyo	200 m
Gold medal – first place	1964 Tokyo	4 × 400 m relay

Henry Carr (November 27, 1942 – May 29, 2015) was an American track and field athlete who won two gold medals at the 1964 Summer Olympics in Tokyo, Japan.

== Early life ==
Born in Montgomery, Alabama, in 1941, Carr moved with his family to Detroit, Michigan when he was young.

Prior to bringing his athletic talents to Arizona State University (ASU), Carr was a state champion sprinter for Northwestern High School in Detroit having posted a 100-yard time of 9.3 seconds. While competing for the ASU Sun Devils, he won three national titles; along the way setting world records at 220 yards and as a member of the Sun Devil 4 × 440 yard relay team.

Henry Carr won the 1963 NCAA title at 200 meters in 20.5; the same year he ran 20.69 to tie Paul Drayton for the USA title. Twice that season Carr ran world records; a non-ratified 20.4 for 220 yards and, three days later in a college triangular meet, a 20.3 for 220 yards. Henry Carr ran even faster in 1964; setting a world record of 20.2 for 220 yards. He also defeated Drayton into second place to win the national title.

== Olympics ==
It was at the 1964 Olympics where Carr would achieve his greatest fame; Carr won the 200 meters (in an Olympic Record time) and anchored the winning 4 × 400 meter relay team to a world record 3:00.7 (with Ollan Cassell, Mike Larrabee and Ulis Williams).

Carr had a fright in his qualification for the Olympics. He had won the semi-final trials held in New York in July and only had to prove his fitness at the final trials in September in Los Angeles. However, he was well beaten into fourth place in the final there and with only 3 to qualify he could have been eliminated. His earlier win was enough though to convince the selectors that he should go to the Olympics.

== Professional football career ==
Following the Olympics, Carr played American football in the National Football League. He was drafted in the fourth round of the 1965 NFL draft by the New York Giants and played three seasons as a safety and cornerback with the Giants. In his last year with them he was hampered by a knee injury.

In 1969, he had a try-out with the Detroit Lions but quit their training camp.

== Personal life ==
After he left the NFL he found difficulty in adjusting and finding work. He found new purpose in 1973 when he became a Jehovah's Witness. In the mid-1970s he was described as living a simple life with his family outside Atlanta, Georgia. In later life, Carr became a Jehovah's Witness elder, and was reported to have done contracting work and owned a restaurant. He died of cancer on May 29, 2015, in Griffin, Georgia.

== Accolades and awards ==
Carr was a 1975 Charter inductee in the Arizona State Sun Devils Athletics Hall of Fame. In 1997, he was inducted into the USA Track and Field Hall of Fame.

== World records ==
Carr set the following world records during his track career:

- 220 y of 20.3 s at Tempe, Arizona on March 23, 1963, in a tri Meet ASU-Utah-USC;
- 4 × 440 y of 3:04.5 at Walnut, California on April 27, 1963, at the Mt. SAC Relays for the ASU;
- 220 y of 20.2 s at Tempe, Arizona on April 4, 1964, in a dual meet ASU-SC Striders;
- 4 × 400 m of 3:00.7 at Tokyo, Japan on October 21, 1964, in the Olympic final.

Note: he also ran a 20.4 s for 220 y on March 19, 1963, that was never ratified as a world record.

== World rankings ==
Carr was ranked among the best in the US and the world in the 100, 200 and 400 m sprint events in the period 1962–64, according to the votes of the experts of Track and Field News.

100 meters
Year	World rank	US rank
1962	6th	4th
1963	3rd	2nd
1964	6th	3rd

200 meters
Year	World rank	US rank
1962	-	-
1963	1st	1st
1964	1st	1st

400 meters
Year	World rank	US rank
1962	-	-
1963	5th	4th
1964	-	5th
