= Malick Diop =

Senegalese sprinter

Personal information
- Nationality: Senegalese
- Born: 24 August 1942 (age 83)

Sport
- Sport: Sprinting
- Event: 4 × 100 metres relay

Malick Diop (born 24 August 1942) is a Senegalese sprinter. He competed in the men's 4 × 100 metres relay at the 1964 Summer Olympics.
