= Taweesit Arjtaweekul =

Thai sprinter

Personal information
- Nationality: Thai
- Born: 9 January 1941 (age 85)

Sport
- Sport: Sprinting
- Event: 4 × 100 metres relay

Taweesit Arjtaweekul (born 9 January 1941) is a Thai sprinter. He competed in the men's 4 × 100 metres relay at the 1964 Summer Olympics.
