= Maitri Vilaikit =

Thai sprinter (born 1944)

Personal information
- Nationality: Thai
- Born: 18 January 1944 (age 82)

Sport
- Sport: Sprinting
- Event: 4 × 100 metres relay

Maitri Vilaikit (born 18 January 1944) is a Thai sprinter. He competed in the men's 4 × 100 metres relay at the 1964 Summer Olympics.
