= Anthony Coutinho =

Indian sprinter

Personal information
- Full name: Anthony Francis Coutinho
- Nationality: Indian
- Born: 25 August 1940 (age 85)

Sport
- Sport: Sprinting
- Event: 4 × 100 metres relay

Anthony Francis Coutinho (born 25 August 1940) is an Indian former sprinter. He competed in the men's 4 × 100 metres relay at the 1964 Summer Olympics.
