= Masaru Kamata =

Japanese sprinter (born 1940)

Personal information
- Nationality: Japanese
- Born: 21 April 1940 (age 86)

Sport
- Sport: Sprinting
- Events: 100 metres 4 × 100 metres relay

Masaru Kamata (蒲田 勝, Kamata Masaru; born 21 April 1940) is a Japanese sprinter. He competed in the men's 100 metres and the men's 4 × 100 metres relay at the 1964 Summer Olympics.
