= Jassim Karim Kuraishi =

Iraqi sprinter

Personal information
- Nationality: Iraqi
- Born: 14 August 1938 (age 87)

Sport
- Sport: Sprinting
- Event: 200 metres

Jassim Karim Kuraishi (born 14 August 1938) is an Iraqi sprinter. He competed in the men's 200 metres and men's 4 × 100 metres relay at the 1964 Summer Olympics.
