= David Jones (runner) =

British sprinter (1940–2023)

Personal information
- Nationality: British (English)
- Born: 11 March 1940 Brookmans Park, Hertfordshire, England
- Died: 1 June 2023 (aged 83) England
- Height: 179 cm (5 ft 10 in)
- Weight: 76 kg (168 lb)

Sport
- Sport: Athletics
- Event: Sprints
- Club: Woodford Green AC
Medal record
Men's athletics
Representing Great Britain
Olympic Games
Bronze medal – third place	1960 Rome	4 × 100 m relay
European Championships
Bronze medal – third place	1962 Belgrade	4 × 100 m relay
Representing England
British Empire and Commonwealth Games
Gold medal – first place	1962 Perth	4 × 110 yd relay
Silver medal – second place	1962 Perth	220 yards

David Henry Jones (11 March 1940 – 1 June 2023) was a British athlete who competed in the 100 & 200 metres who competed at the 1960 Summer Olympics.

== Biography ==
Jones, a son of a farmer, was educated at Felsted School.

Jones became the British 220 yards champion after winning the British AAA Championships title at the 1959 AAA Championships and successfully defened the title the following year at the 1960 AAA Championships.

At the 1960 Olympic Games in Rome, he represented Great Britain in the 4 x 100 metre relay where he won the bronze medal with his teammates Peter Radford, David Segal and Nick Whitehead. He reached the 100 metres semi-final where he was denied a place in the final in a photo finish with Ray Norton of the USA although there are photos that seem to suggest he finished ahead of Norton.

He won his third consecutive AAA titles over 220 yards at the 1961 AAA Championships but lost out to Kenyan Seraphino Antao in 1962. He was the holder of World Best performance over 150 yards in time of 13.9 secs in May 1961 at Southend-on-Sea and subsequently won a gold medal in the 4 x 110 yards relay in the England team, with Peter Radford, Alf Meakin, Len Carter, as well as winning a silver medal in the 220 yards event in the 1962 British Empire and Commonwealth Games in Perth, Western Australia.

Jones won a fourth AAA title at the 1963 AAA Championships and was part of the 4 x 110 yards relay team (Peter Radford, Ron Jones & Berwyn Jones were his teammates) who defeated the USA team (which included Bob Hayes) at the White City Stadium in 1963 during the GB v USA match.

David was also part of the ITV Track & Field commentary team for the 1964 Tokyo Olympics. He was a significant hockey player, appearing for Southgate Hockey Club.

Jones moved to Mallorca in 2003, where he died of liver cancer on 1 June 2023, at the age of 83.
