= Sergio Ottolina =

Italian sprinter (1942–2023)

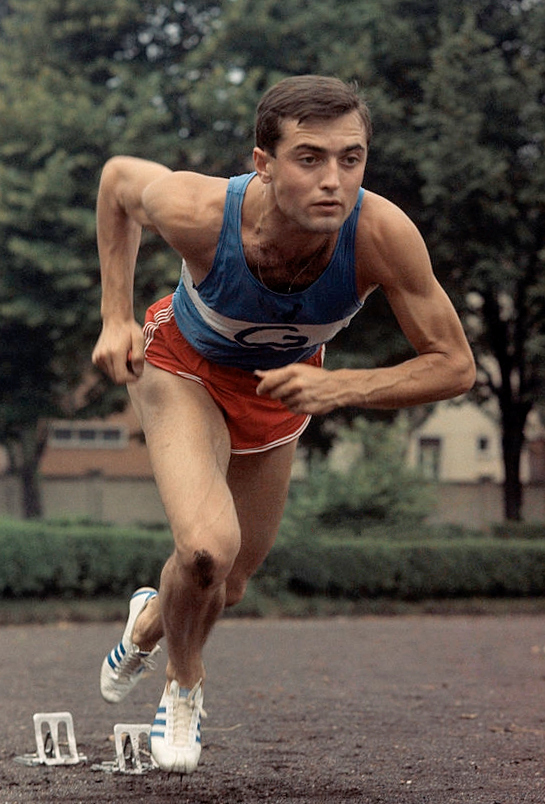
- Ottolina in 1964

Personal information
- Nationality: Italian
- Born: 23 November 1942 Lentate sul Seveso, Italy
- Died: 28 April 2023 (aged 80)
- Height: 1.74 m (5 ft 9 in)
- Weight: 68 kg (150 lb)

Sport
- Country: Italy
- Sport: Athletics
- Event: Sprint
- Club: C.S. Esercito
- Coached by: Peppino Russo
- Retired: 1972

Achievements and titles
- Personal bests: 100 m: 10"3 (1962); 200 m: 20"4 (1964); 400 m: 46"2 (1965)
Medal record
Men's athletics
Representing Italy
European Championships
Bronze medal – third place	1962 Belgrade	200 m
European Indoor Championships
Silver medal – second place	1966 Dortmund	Medley relay
Mediterranean Games
Gold medal – first place	1963 Naples	4×100 m
Gold medal – first place	1967 Tunis	4×400 m
Bronze medal – third place	1963 Naples	200 m

Sergio Ottolina (23 November 1942 – 28 April 2023) was an Italian sprinter. He won a bronze medal in the 200 m at the 1962 European Athletics Championships and a silver medal in the sprint medley relay at the 1966 European Indoor Games.

On 24 June 1964, he set a European record in the 200 m at 20.4 seconds that stood for three years. He competed at the 1964 and 1968 Summer Olympics in five individual and team sprint events in total, with the best achievements of seventh place in the 4 × 100 m relay (1964 and 1968) and in the 4 × 400 m relay (1968). Ottolina retired from competitions shortly before the 1972 Games due to a motorcycle accident.

Ottolina died on 28 April 2023, at the age of 80.

== International competitions ==
Year	Competition	Venue	Position	Event	Notes
1962	European Championships	Belgrade, Yugoslavia	3rd	200 metres	20.8
1964	Olympic Games	Tokyo, Japan	8th	200 metres	20.9
1964	Olympic Games	Tokyo, Japan	7th	4×100 relay	38.5
1966	European Indoor Games	Dortmund, West Germany	2nd	Medley relay	3:22.2
1968	Olympic Games	Mexico City, Mexico	7th	4×100 relay	39.2
1968	Olympic Games	Mexico City, Mexico	7th	4×400 relay	3:04.6

== National titles ==
- Two titles in the 100 metres at the Italian Athletics Championships (1963, 1964)

== See also ==
- Italy national relays team at the international athletics championships
