= Bassirou Doumbia =

Senegalese sprinter

Personal information
- Nationality: Senegalese
- Born: 12 May 1942 (age 84)

Sport
- Sport: Sprinting
- Event: 100 metres

Bassirou Doumbia (born 12 May 1942) is a Senegalese sprinter. He participated at the 1964 Olympic Games in Tokyo.
