= Ron Jones (sprinter) =

British sprinter (1934–2021)

Personal information
- Nationality: British (Welsh)
- Born: 19 August 1934 Aberdare, Wales
- Died: 30 December 2021 (aged 87) Cambridge, England
- Height: 180 cm (5 ft 11 in)
- Weight: 78 kg (172 lb)

Sport
- Sport: Athletics
- Event: Sprints
- Club: Birchgrove Harriers; Woodford Green AC; Enfield Harriers
Medal record
Men's athletics
Representing Great Britain
European Championships
Bronze medal – third place	1962 Belgrade	4×100 m
Representing Wales
British Empire and Commonwealth Games
Bronze medal – third place	1962 Perth	4×110 yd

Ronald Jones (19 August 1934 – 30 December 2021) was a British track and field athlete who competed at two Olympic Games.

== Biography ==
Jones was born on 19 August 1934 in Aberdare, Rhondda Cynon Taf. Jones was running for the Birchgrove Harriers when he finished fourth in the 100 yards event at the 1958 AAA Championships. By being the highest placed British athlete in the event he was considered the British 100 yards champion. The following year he finished third behind Peter Radford in the 100 yards at the 1959 AAA Championships.

Jones won the bronze medal in the men's 4x100 metres relay at the 1962 European Championships in Belgrade, Yugoslavia, alongside Alf Meakin, Berwyn Jones, and David Jones. He also won a bronze medal with David England, Nick Whitehead and Berwyn Jones in the 4 x 110 yards relay while competing for Wales at the 1962 British Empire and Commonwealth Games in Perth, Australia. He combined with Peter Radford, David Jones and Berwyn Jones to equal the world 4 x 110 yds world record in 1963 with 40.0 secs. Ron held the Welsh 100m record for 27 years until it was beaten by future world 110m hurdles record holder Colin Jackson with 10.29 in 1990.

Jones represented Great Britain at two consecutive Summer Olympics, starting with the 1964 Tokyo Games. He was Britain's team captain in the 1968 Mexico Games.

He represented the 1966 Welsh team at the 1966 British Empire and Commonwealth Games in Kingston, Jamaica, participating in one event; the 100 yards.

Jones won another British AAA Championships title at the 1969 AAA Championships, having previously been classified as British champion in 1968 because of a second-place finish behind Paul Nash.

After his athletics career, he became either the CEO or MD of three major football clubs in the English leagues. He was also a member of both the Welsh Athletics Hall of Fame and the Welsh Sports Hall of Fame.

He died in Cambridge on 30 December 2021, at the age of 87.

== Sources ==
- British Olympic Committee
- Sports Reference
