= Jerzy Juskowiak =

Polish sprinter

Personal information
- Nationality: Polish
- Born: 3 May 1939 Bojanowo, Poland
- Died: 10 December 1993 (aged 54) Poznań, Poland
- Height: 1.74 m (5 ft 9 in)
- Weight: 65 kg (143 lb)

Sport
- Sport: Sprinting
- Event: 4 × 100 metres relay
- Club: ZawiszA Bydgoszcz; Orkan Poznań
Medal record
Men's athletics
Representing Poland
European Championships
| Silver medal – second place | 1962 Belgrade | 4×100 m |

Jerzy Juskowiak (3 May 1939 – 10 December 1993) was a Polish sprinter. He competed in the men's 4 × 100 metres relay at the 1960 Summer Olympics.

== International competitions ==
| Year | Competition | Venue | Position | Event | Notes |
Representing Poland
| 1959 | World Festival of Youth and Students | Vienna, Austria | 1st | 100 m | 10.5 |
| 1960 | Olympic Games | Rome, Italy | – | 4 × 100 m relay | DQ |
| 1962 | European Championships | Belgrade, Yugoslavia | 5th | 100 m | 10.4 |
| 1962 | European Championships | Belgrade, Yugoslavia | 2nd | 4 × 100 m relay | 39.5 |

== Personal bests ==
Outdoor

- 100 metres – 10.3h (Olsztyn 1962)
- 200 metres – 21.2h (Łódź 1962)

Indoor

- 60 metres – 6.5h (Warsaw 1962)
