= Abdoulaye N'Diaye =

Senegalese sprinter

Personal information
- Nationality: Senegalese
- Born: 28 April 1941 (age 85)

Sport
- Sport: Sprinting
- Event: 100 metres

Abdoulaye N'Diaye (born 28 April 1941) is a Senegalese sprinter. He competed in the men's 100 metres at the 1964 Summer Olympics.
