= Khalid Tawfik Lazim =

Iraqi sprinter

Personal information
- Nationality: Iraqi
- Born: 9 March 1944 (age 82)

Sport
- Sport: Sprinting
- Event: 4 × 100 metres relay

Khalid Tawfik Lazim (born 9 March 1944) is an Iraqi sprinter. He competed in the men's 4 × 100 metres relay at the 1964 Summer Olympics.
