= Haji Mohd Lazim Bridge =

Tanjung Sedili Bridge Jambatan Haji Mohd Lazim جمبتن حاج محمد لازيم
- Coordinates: 1°56′06″N 104°06′25″E
- Carries: Motor vehicles, Pedestrians
- Crosses: Sedili Besar River
- Locale: Jalan Sedili Besar
- Official name: Haji Mohd Lazim Bridge
- Maintained by: Malaysian Public Works Department (JKR) Kota Tinggi

Characteristics
- Design: box girder bridge
- Total length: 600 m
- Width: --
- Longest span: --

History
- Designer: Malaysian Public Works Department (JKR)
- Opened: 2009

Haji Mohd Lazim Bridge or Tanjung Sedili Bridge (Malay: Jambatan Haji Mohd Lazim Jawi: جمبتن حاج محمد لازيم) is a river bridge in Sedili, Johor, Malaysia. The bridges crosses Sedili Besar River. A road bridge spans the river near its mouth close to the village of Tanjung Sedili. It spans 600 metres across the river and links the coastal regions to the north and south of the river. Its construction was completed in around 2006 and it opened in 2009. It was named after Ustaz Haji Mohd Lazim bin Saim, an Islamic religious school teacher of the Madrasah Arabiah Kluang.
