= Amir Vahab =

Amir Alan Vahab is a Sufi musician and educator in Persian culture and traditional music.

== Biography ==
Amir Vahab was born in Tehran. Vahab started his musical education at an early age; by the time he turned 13, he had become a skilled player and instructor of the tanbur, setar, daf, saz and ney. Vahab moved to London in 1976 at the age of 17 to further his education. Travelling through Europe, Vahab completed a degree in linguistics at the University of Paris and studied horology and jewelry design in Switzerland, before moving to New York City in 1981. In New York Vahab established himself as a professional musician and jeweler before abandoning the latter business to focus on music.

== Music ==
In addition to solo work, Vahab performs with the Soroosh Ensemble, a traditional Persian music ensemble of approximately 40 to 50 members which he founded in 1981. Vahab sings and performs on a variety of traditional Persian musical instruments including the tanbur, ney, daf and tonbak as well as classical guitar. His music is noted for its spirituality, improvisation, and use of lyrics from medieval Sufi poets; he has been described as "one of the world's most revered players and composers of Persian folk music".

Vahab has composed and performed music for Iranian film and theatrical performances since 1990, and has performed on Iranian television in the United States; he has released seven albums as of August 2010.
