= Alioune Sow =

Senegalese sprinter

Personal information
- Nationality: Senegalese
- Born: 19 December 1936 (age 89)

Sport
- Sport: Sprinting
- Event: 200 metres

Alioune Sow (born 19 February 1936) is a Senegalese sprinter. He competed in the men's 200 metres at the 1964 Summer Olympics.
