= Abdoulaye Ndiaye (businessman) =

Senegalese businessman and entrepreneur (born 1952)

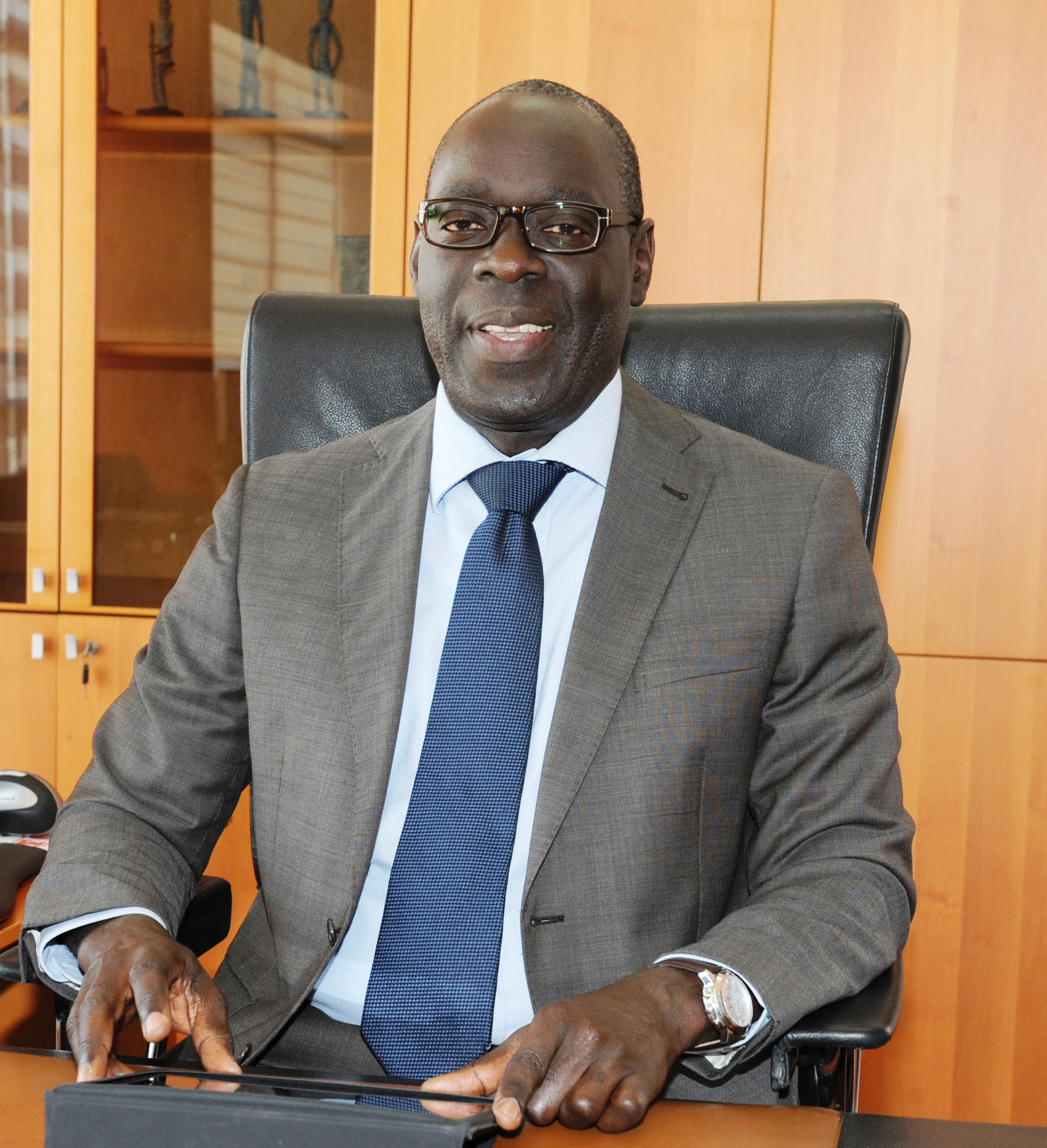
- Born: Abdoulaye Ndiaye; 15 March 1952 (age 74); Médina Gounass, Senegal
- Other name: Gounass
- Occupations: Entrepreneur; gemologist
- Years active: 1972–present

Abdoulaye Ndiaye (born 15 March 1952) is a Senegalese businessman and entrepreneur based in Kitwe, Zambia.

== Career ==
Abdoulaye's companies have created employment and business opportunities for more than 800 people in Zambia and Senegal, this in turn contributes significantly towards government revenue, in terms of various taxes.

Abdoulaye came to Zambia in 1972 and started his business of buying and selling of emeralds from Lufwanya on the Copperbelt of Zambia until he bought an emerald mine in 1997. The major product that Abdoulaye's mine produces is raw and partially processed emeralds and beryl (Zambian emeralds often have a distinct shade of bluish-tinged green).

Abdoulaye is also a principal shareholder in International companies such as Ontario Group of Companies S.A., a real estate company based in Dakar, Senegal, and Gounasse International Inc., a company involved in real estate as well as in the hospitality industry.

=== Gemcanton ===
Gemcanton is based in Kitwe and owned by Abdoulaye. The company contributes in gemstone mining including emerald and beryl production.

The company focuses on improving the lives of indigenous people residing within the vicinity of mine-sites. Gemcanton has invested in education by constructing two community schools in the district, one of which has since been handed over to the Ministry of Education. The company is involved in the annual road maintenance throughout the district. Gemcanton is the principal sponsor of Kitwe Afrisport Club since 2012, which is now playing in division 2. Kitwe United were sponsored up to December 2012.

=== Grizzly Mining ===
Grizzly Mining Limited was incorporated as mining company by Abdoulaye in 1997 and subsequently other companies were incorporated. The company is headquartered at Kitwe. Grizzly Mining Limited is engaged in the production, processing, grading, marketing and supply of emeralds and beryl.

==== Zambian emeralds ====
Zambian emeralds tend to have more of a bluish cast than either Brazilian or Colombian emeralds, and tend towards a slight grayish cast, which is not present in either Colombian or Brazilian emeralds.

Zambian and Brazilian emeralds may also be coloured by trace vanadium, whereas Colombian emeralds usually are colored by trace chromium.

== Personal life ==
Abdoulaye was born in 1952, in the village of Médina Gounass, Senegal, where he attended an Islamic school. His nickname "Gounass", is from the town where he grew up.

After the purchase of his emerald mine, Abdoulaye settled in Kitwe, Zambia, where he established his other businesses.

Abdoulaye has been married several times and has 13 children.
