= Abdolvahab Shahkhoreh =

Iranian sprinter

Personal information
- Nationality: Iranian
- Born: 16 March 1936 Khorramshahr, Iran
- Died: 24 December 2006 (aged 70) Tehran, Iran

Sport
- Sport: Sprinting
- Event: 200 metres

Abdolvahab Shahkhorehnejad (Persian: عبدالوهاب شاهخوره‌نژاد; 16 March 1936 – 24 December 2006) was an Iranian sprinter. He competed in the men's 200 metres at the 1964 Summer Olympics.
