= Jeong Gi-seon =

South Korean sprinter

Personal information
- Nationality: South Korean
- Born: 25 April 1937 (age 89)

Sport
- Sport: Sprinting
- Event: 100 metres

Jeong Gi-seon (born 25 April 1937) is a South Korean sprinter. He competed in the men's 100 metres at the 1964 Summer Olympics.

Jeong held the last South Korean record in the 100 m before the advent of fully automatic timing, running 10.3 seconds at Hyochang Stadium in 1968. He was noted for his short stature at only 1.68 metres (5 ft 6 in) tall.
