= Valeriu Jurcă =

Romanian sprinter (born 1939)

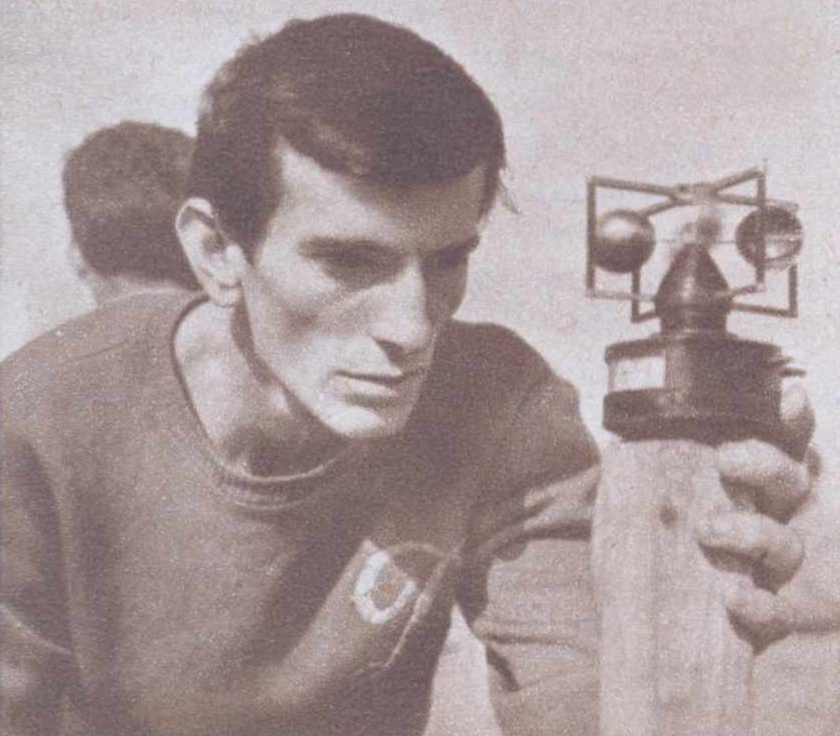
- Jurcă in 1963

Personal information
- Nationality: Romanian
- Born: 8 April 1939 (age 87) Ploiești, Romania

Sport
- Sport: Sprinting
- Event: 200 metres

Valeriu Jurcă (born 8 April 1939) is a Romanian sprinter. He competed in the men's 200 metres at the 1964 Summer Olympics.
