= Carlos Lorenzo =

Mexican sprinter (born 1942)

Carlos Lorenzo Mañueco
Personal information
- Full name: Carlos Lorenzo Mañueco
- Nationality: Mexican
- Born: 25 February 1942 (age 84)

Sport
- Sport: Sprinting
- Event: 100 metres

Carlos Lorenzo Mañueco (born 25 February 1942) is a Mexican sprinter. He competed in the men's 100 metres as well as the mens 200 meters at the 1964 Summer Olympics.
