= Malang Mané =

Senegalese sprinter

Personal information
- Nationality: Senegalese
- Born: 30 November 1943
- Died: 19 March 2024 (aged 80)

Sport
- Sport: Sprinting
- Event: 4 × 100 metres relay

Malang Mané (30 November 1943 – 19 March 2024) was a Senegalese sprinter. He competed in the 4 × 100 metres relay at the 1964 Summer Olympics and the 1972 Summer Olympics.
