= William Earle (athlete) =

Australian sprinter

Personal information
- Nationality: Australian
- Born: 4 March 1941 (age 85)

Sport
- Sport: Sprinting
- Event: 100 metres

William Earle (born 4 March 1941) is an Australian sprinter. He competed in the men's 100 metres at the 1964 Summer Olympics.
