= 1962 European Athletics Championships =

7th European Athletics Championships
- Dates: 12 – 16 September
- Host city: Belgrade, Yugoslavia
- Venue: JNA Stadium
- Level: Senior
- Type: Outdoor
- Events: 36
- Participation: 670 athletes from 29 nations

The 7th European Athletics Championships were held from 12–16 September 1962 in the JNA Stadium in Belgrade, Yugoslavia (present-day Serbia). Contemporaneous reports on the event were given in the Glasgow Herald. Just before the meet, the IAAF council approved the use of glass fibre poles for pole vaulting. As a consequence, competitors were able to use them during the meet if they wished.

== Medal summary ==
Complete results were published.

=== Men ===
Event	Gold		Silver		Bronze	
100 metres	Claude Piquemal (FRA)	10.4	Jocelyn Delecour (FRA)	10.4	Peter Gamper (FRG)	10.4
200 metres	Owe Jonsson (SWE)	20.7 CR	Marian Foik (POL)	20.8	Sergio Ottolina (ITA)	20.8
400 metres	Robbie Brightwell (GBR)	45.9 CR	Manfred Kinder (FRG)	46.1	Joachim Reske (FRG)	46.4
800 metres	Manfred Matuschewski (GDR)	1:50.5	Valeriy Bulyshev (URS)	1:51.2	Paul Schmidt (FRG)	1:51.2
1500 metres	Michel Jazy (FRA)	3:40.9 CR	Witold Baran (POL)	3:42.1	Tomáš Salinger (TCH)	3:42.2
5000 metres	Bruce Tulloh (GBR)	14:00.6	Kazimierz Zimny (POL)	14:01.8	Pyotr Bolotnikov (URS)	14:02.6
10,000 metres	Pyotr Bolotnikov (URS)	28:54.0 CR	Friedrich Janke (GDR)	29:01.6	Roy Fowler (GBR)	29:02.0
110 metres hurdles	Anatoly Mikhailov (URS)	13.8	Giovanni Cornacchia (ITA)	14.0	Nikolay Berezutskiy (URS)	14.2
400 metres hurdles	Salvatore Morale (ITA)	49.2 CR, WR	Jörg Neumann (FRG)	50.3	Helmut Janz (FRG)	50.5
3000 metres steeplechase	Gaston Roelants (BEL)	8:32.6 CR	Zoltan Vamoș (ROU)	8:37.6	Nikolay Sokolov (URS)	8:40.6
4 × 100 metres relay	West Germany; Klaus Ulonska; Peter Gamper; Hans-Joachim Bender; Manfred Germar	39.5 CR	Poland; Jerzy Juskowiak; Andrzej Zieliński; Zbigniew Syka; Marian Foik	39.5	Great Britain; Alf Meakin; Ron Jones; Berwyn Jones; David Jones	39.8
4 × 400 metres relay	West Germany; Wilfried Kindermann; Johannes Schmitt; Joachim Reske; Manfred Kinder	3:05.8 CR	Great Britain; Barry Jackson; Ken Wilcock; Adrian Metcalfe; Robbie Brightwell	3:05.9	Switzerland; Bruno Galliker; Jean-Louis Descloux; Marius Theiler; Hans-Rüdi Bruder	3:07.0
Marathon	Brian Kilby (GBR)	2:23:18.8	Aurèle Vandendriessche (BEL)	2:24:02.0	Viktor Baykov (URS)	2:24:19.8
20 kilometres walk	Ken Matthews (GBR)	1:35:54.8	Hans-Georg Reimann (GDR)	1:36:14.2	Vladimir Golubnichiy (URS)	1:36:37.6
50 kilometres walk	Abdon Pamich (ITA)	4:19:46.6	Grigoriy Panichkin (URS)	4:24:35.6	Donald Thompson (GBR)	4:29:00.2
High jump	Valeriy Brumel (URS)	2.21 m CR	Stig Pettersson (SWE)	2.13 m	Robert Shavlakadze (URS)	2.09 m
Pole vault	Pentti Nikula (FIN)	4.80 m CR	Rudolf Tomášek (TCH)	4.60 m	Kauko Nyström (FIN)	4.60 m
Long jump^{[nb]}	Igor Ter-Ovanesyan (URS)	8.19 m (+3.2) (7.87 m CR)	Rainer Stenius (FIN)	7.85 m	Pentti Eskola (FIN)	7.85 m
Triple jump	Józef Szmidt (POL)	16.55 m CR	Vladimir Goryaev (URS)	16.39 m	Oleg Fyodoseyev (URS)	16.24 m
Shot put	Vilmos Varjú (HUN)	19.02 m CR	Viktor Lipsnis (URS)	18.38 m	Alfred Sosgórnik (POL)	18.26 m
Discus throw	Vladimir Trusenyev (URS)	57.11 m CR	Kees Koch (NED)	55.96 m	Lothar Milde (GDR)	55.47 m
Javelin throw	Jānis Lūsis (URS)	82.04 m CR	Viktor Tsybulenko (URS)	77.92 m	Władysław Nikiciuk (POL)	77.66 m
Hammer throw	Gyula Zsivótzky (HUN)	69.64 m CR	Aleksey Baltovskiy (URS)	66.93 m	Yuriy Bakarinov (URS)	66.57 m
Decathlon	Vasili Kuznetsov (URS)	8026 pts CR	Werner von Moltke (FRG)	8022 pts	Manfred Bock (FRG)	7835 pts

- ^{nb} Igor Ter-Ovanesyan's championship record of 7.81 metres, set at the previous edition in 1958, was bettered by all the medalling athletes in 1962. Ter-Ovanesyan's winning jump of 8.19 metres was wind-assisted – although Finns Rainer Stenius and Pentti Eskola cleared 7.85 m, Ter-Ovanesyan's non-wind-assisted jump of 7.82 m in qualification round (13 September) and Ter-Ovanesyan's best non-wind-assisted jump of 7.87 m in final (14 September) were ratified as the new championship marks.

=== Women ===
Event	Gold		Silver		Bronze	
100 metres^{[nb2]} (wind: +2.3 m/s)	Dorothy Hyman (GBR)	11.3 w	Jutta Heine (FRG)	11.3 w	Teresa Ciepły (POL)	11.4 w
200 metres	Jutta Heine (FRG)	23.5 CR	Dorothy Hyman (GBR)	23.7	Barbara Sobotta (POL)	23.9
400 metres	Maria Itkina (URS)	53.4 CR	Joy Grieveson (GBR)	53.9	Tilly van der Zwaard (NED)	54.4
800 metres	Gerda Kraan (NED)	2:02.8 CR	Waltraud Kaufmann (GDR)	2:05.0	Olga Kazi (HUN)	2:05.0
4 × 100 metres relay	Poland; Teresa Ciepły; Barbara Sobotta; Elżbieta Szyroka; Maria Piątkowska	44.5 CR	West Germany; Erika Fisch; Martha Pensberger; Maren Collin; Jutta Heine	44.6	Great Britain; Ann Packer; Dorothy Hyman; Daphne Arden; Mary Rand	44.9
80 metres hurdles	Teresa Ciepły (POL)	10.6 CR	Karin Balzer (GDR)	10.6	Maria Piątkowska (POL); Erika Fisch (FRG)	10.6
High jump	Iolanda Balaş (ROU)	1.83 m CR	Olga Gere (YUG)	1.76 m	Linda Knowles (GBR)	1.73 m
Long jump	Tatyana Shchelkanova (URS)	6.36 m CR	Elżbieta Krzesińska (POL)	6.22 m	Mary Rand (GBR)	6.22 m
Shot put	Tamara Press (URS)	18.55 m CR	Renate Garisch (GDR)	17.17 m	Galina Zybina (URS)	16.95 m
Discus throw	Tamara Press (URS)	56.91 m CR	Doris Müller (GDR)	53.60 m	Jolán Kontsek (HUN)	52.82 m
Javelin throw	Elvīra Ozoliņa (URS)	54.93 m	Maria Diaconescu (ROU)	52.10 m	Alevtina Shastitko (URS)	51.80 m
Pentathlon	Galina Bystrova (URS)	4833 pts CR	Denise Guénard (FRA)	4735 pts	Helga Hoffmann (FRG)	4676 pts

- ^{nb2} The women's 100 metres silver medallist Jutta Heine bettered the championship record twice in qualifying, running 11.5, then 11.4 seconds. Both times were ratified as championship records. In the final Dorothy Hyman and Heine ran 11.3 but this was wind-assisted.

== Medal table ==
Rank	Nation	Gold	Silver	Bronze	Total
1	Soviet Union (URS)	13	6	10	29
2	Great Britain (GBR)	5	3	6	14
3	West Germany (FRG)	3	5	7	15
4	Poland (POL)	3	5	5	13
5	France (FRA)	2	2	0	4
6	Italy (ITA)	2	1	1	4
7	Hungary (HUN)	2	0	2	4
8	East Germany (GDR)	1	6	1	8
9	Romania (ROU)	1	2	0	3
10	Finland (FIN)	1	1	2	4
11	Netherlands (NED)	1	1	1	3
12	Belgium (BEL)	1	1	0	2
12	Sweden (SWE)	1	1	0	2
14	Czechoslovakia (TCH)	0	1	1	2
15	Yugoslavia (SFR Yugoslavia)	0	1	0	1
16	Switzerland (SUI)	0	0	1	1
Totals (16 entries)		36	36	37	109

== Participation ==
According to an unofficial count, 668 athletes from 29 countries participated in the event, two athletes less than the official number of 670 as published. There was a joint German team comprising athletes from both East and West Germany. Assignment to their respective country was accomplished using the database of Deutsche Gesellschaft für Leichtathletik-Dokumentation 1990 e.V.

- Austria (9)
- Belgium (11)
- Bulgaria (21)
- Czechoslovakia (25)
- Denmark (4)
- Finland (29)
- France (42)
- Germany (96)
  - East Germany (50)
  - West Germany (46)
- Great Britain (74)
- Greece (11)
- Hungary (40)
- Iceland (4)
- Ireland (4)
- Italy (36)
- Liechtenstein (2)
- Luxembourg (3)
- Malta (1)
- Netherlands (8)
- Norway (14)
- Poland (50)
- Portugal (3)
- Romania (18)
- Soviet Union (74)
- Spain (6)
- Sweden (18)
- Switzerland (16)
- Turkey (11)
- Yugoslavia (38)
