= Alf Meakin =

British sprinter & rugby league player (1938–2025)

Personal information
- Nationality: British (English)
- Born: 30 August 1938 Swinton, England
- Died: 13 December 2025 (aged 87) Blackpool, England

Sport
- Sport: Men's athletics
- Event: 100 metres
- Club: Thames Valley Harriers

Achievements and titles
- Personal best: 10.4 (1963)
Medal record
Men's athletics
Representing Great Britain
European Championships
Bronze medal – third place	1962 Belgrade	4 × 100 m relay
Representing England
British Empire and Commonwealth Games
Gold medal – first place	1962 Perth	4 × 110 yd relay
- Rugby league career

Playing information
- Position: Wing
Club
Years	Team	Pld	T	G	FG	P
1964	Leeds	1	0	0	0	0
1965–67	Blackpool Borough	53	14	0	0	42
	Total	54	14	0	0	42

Alfred F. Meakin (30 August 1938 – 13 December 2025) was a British track and field athlete and rugby league footballer.

== Background ==
Meakin was born in Swinton, England on 30 August 1938. He died in Blackpool on 13 December 2025 at the age of 87.

== Athletics career ==
Meakin represented Great Britain in the men's 100 metres at the 1964 Summer Olympics in Tokyo, Japan.

He won the bronze medal in the men's 4 × 100 meters relay at the 1962 European Athletics Championships in Belgrade, Yugoslavia, alongside Ron Jones, Berwyn Jones, and David Jones.

Meakin represented England and won a gold medal in the 4 x 110 yards relay with Peter Radford, Len Carter and David Jones, at the 1962 British Empire and Commonwealth Games in Perth, Western Australia.

== Rugby league career ==
After the 1964 Olympics, Meakin began playing rugby league. He made one appearance for Leeds as a triallist before later joining Blackpool Borough.

== Sources ==
- British Olympic Committee
