= Frans Luitjes =

Dutch sprinter (1944–1965)

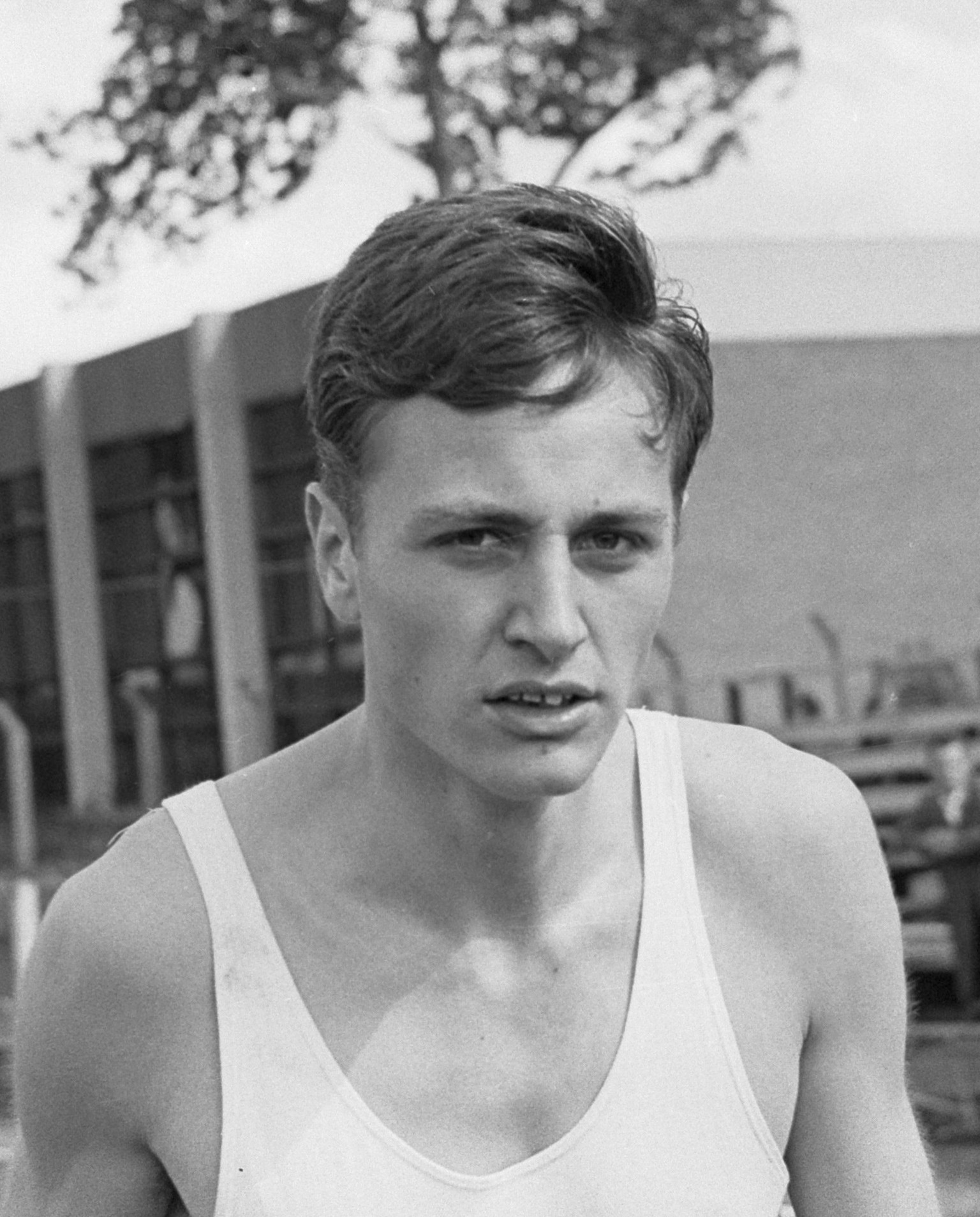
- Frans Luitjes in 1963

Personal information
- Born: 21 June 1944 Utrecht, the Netherlands
- Died: 27 October 1965 (aged 21) The Hague, the Netherlands
- Height: 1.83 m (6 ft 0 in)
- Weight: 72 kg (159 lb)

Sport
- Sport: Athletics (sprint)
- Club: De Trekvogels, Den Haag

Franciscus Jacobus "Frans" Luitjes (21 June 1944 – 27 October 1965) was a Dutch sprinter. He competed at the 1964 Summer Olympics in the 100 m and 200 m events, but failed to reach the finals.

In 1964, Luitjes was selected the KNAU Athlete of the Year. He died in 1965, aged 21, as a result of neglected lymph node inflammation.

Awards
| Preceded by Henk Evers | Herman van Leeuwen Cup; 1964 | Succeeded by Fred van Herpen |
