= Owe Jonsson =

Swedish sprinter, ice hockey player and bandy player (1940–1962)

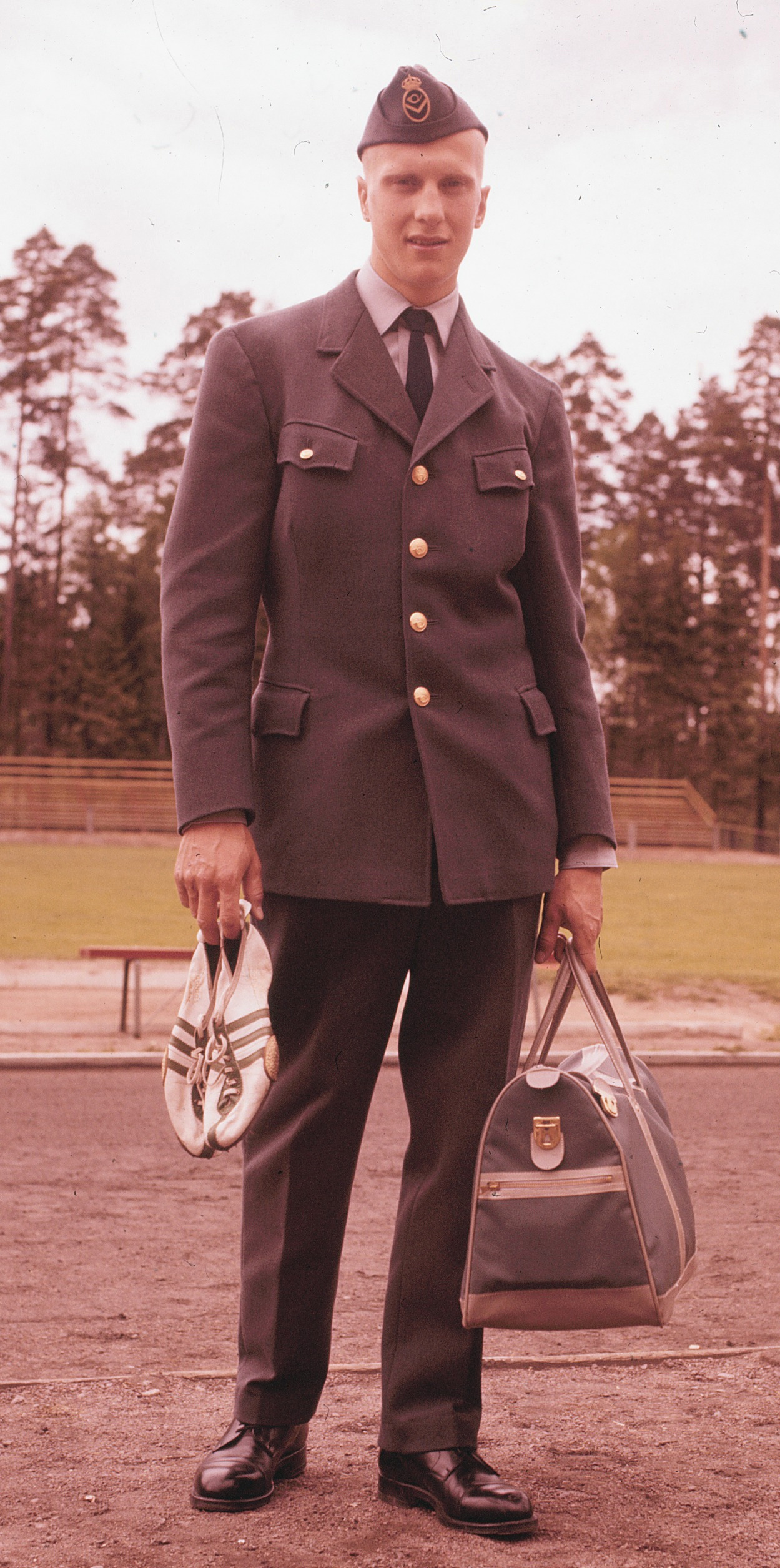
- Jonsson in 1961

Personal information
- Born: 23 November 1940 Albacken, Sweden
- Died: 29 September 1962 (aged 21)

Sport
- Sport: Athletics
- Event: Sprint
- Club: IFK Växjö

Achievements and titles
- Personal best: 200 m – 20.7 (1962)
Medal record
Men's athletics
Representing Sweden
European Championships
Gold medal – first place	1962 Belgrade	200 m

Owe Jonsson (23 November 1940 – 29 September 1962) was a Swedish sprinter, ice hockey player and bandy player.

Jonsson mostly competed in 100–400 m sprint events, winning seven national titles in 1960–1962. His favorite distance was 200 m, in which he broke the Swedish national record six times and won the European champion title in Belgrade in September 1962 with a new record of 20.7. Less than two weeks after that he died in a car accident on the road between his hometown, Växjö, and Alvesta. A street near the athletics track in Växjö is named after him. Besides athletics, Jonsson also played ice hockey and bandy for Nässjö IF.
