= Paul Drayton (athlete) =

American sprinter (1939–2010)

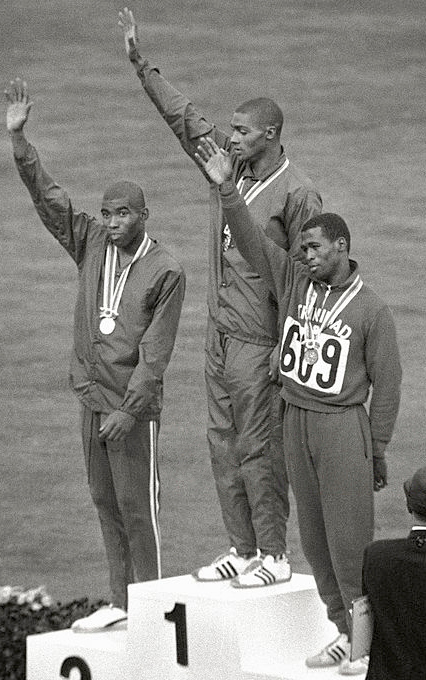
- Paul Drayton (left) at the 1964 Olympics

Personal information
- Born: May 8, 1939 Glen Cove, New York, U.S.
- Died: March 2, 2010 (aged 70) Cleveland, Ohio, U.S.
- Height: 1.83 m (6 ft 0 in)
- Weight: 73 kg (161 lb)

Sport
- Sport: Sprint running
- Club: U.S. Army; Villanova Wildcats

Achievements and titles
- Personal bests: 100 yd – 9.3 (1961); 100 m – 10.2 (1962); 200 m – 20.55 (1962); 440 yd – 47.2 (1964)
Medal record
Representing the United States
Olympic Games
| Gold medal – first place | 1964 Tokyo | 4 × 100 m relay |
| Silver medal – second place | 1964 Tokyo | 200 m |

Otis Paul Drayton (May 8, 1939 – March 2, 2010) was an American sprint runner.

== Career ==
He was an AAU champion in the 220 yd (200 m) sprint from 1961 to 1963. In 1961, he was a member of the world record of 39.1 seconds setting American 4 × 100 m relay team, and equaled the 200 m world record of 20.5 s in 1962. At the 1964 Olympics, Drayton won a silver medal in the 200 m and ran the opening leg for the gold medal-winning American 4 × 100 m relay team, which set a world record at 39.06 seconds.

Pathe Highlights of 1964 Olympic Trials @1:20 Video on YouTube

In retirement, Drayton lived with his wife near Cleveland, Ohio, where he worked as deputy project director for the city's Division of Recreation and then at the sheriff's department. He died on March 2, 2010, of a pulmonary embolism following cancer surgery.
