= Richard Stebbins =

American athlete (born 1945)

Personal information
- Born: Richard Vaughn Stebbins; June 14, 1945 (age 81) Los Angeles, California, U.S.
Medal record
Men's athletics
Representing the United States
Olympic Games
Gold medal – first place	1964 Tokyo	4 × 100 m relay

Richard Vaughn Stebbins (born June 14, 1945) is an American former athlete, winner of gold medal in 4 × 100 m relay at the 1964 Summer Olympics.

At the Tokyo Olympics, Richard Stebbins finished seventh in 200 m and ran the third leg in the gold medal winning American 4 × 100 m relay team, which set a new world record of 39.0. At the medal ceremony, he got carried by his team to receive this gold medal.

Stebbins was born and raised in Los Angeles, and later attended Grambling State University, where he played football and ran track. Following his college career, he was drafted as an end (wide receiver) by the New York Giants in 1967.
