= Gyula Rábai =

Hungarian sprinter

Personal information
- Born: 2 June 1942 (age 84) Székesfehérvár, Hungary

Sport
- Sport: Track and field
Medal record
Representing Hungary
Summer Universiade
Gold medal – first place	1963 Porto Alegre	4x100m relay
Silver medal – second place	1965 Budapest	4x400m relay

Gyula Rábai (born 2 June 1942) is a Hungarian former sprinter who competed in the 1964 Summer Olympics.
