= Berwyn Jones =

GB international rugby league footballer & athlete

Personal information
- Born: 13 February 1940 Rhymney, Monmouthshire, Wales
- Died: 11 January 2007 (aged 66) Ross-on-Wye, Herefordshire, England

Playing information

Rugby union
- Position: Wing
Club
Years	Team	Pld	T	G	FG	P
1964–67	Rhymney

Rugby league
- Position: Wing
Club
Years	Team	Pld	T	G	FG	P
1964–67	Wakefield Trinity	189	47
1967–69	Bradford Northern
1969	St. Helens	4	2	0	0	6
	Total	193	49	0	0	6
Representative
Years	Team	Pld	T	G	FG	P
≤1965–≥65	Commonwealth XIII	≥1
1965	Other Nationalities	1
1964–66	Great Britain	3	3	0	0	9
Medals
Men's athletics
Representing Great Britain
European Championships
Bronze medal – third place	1962 Belgrade	4 × 100 m relay
Summer Universiade
Silver medal – second place	1961 Sofia	100m
Representing Wales
British Empire and Commonwealth Games
Bronze medal – third place	1962 Perth	4 × 110 yd relay

Thomas Berwyn Jones (13 February 1940 – 13 January 2007) was a Welsh sprint athlete, and rugby union, and professional rugby league footballer who played in the 1960s. He played club level rugby union (RU) for Rhymney RFC, as a wing, and representative level rugby league (RL) for Great Britain, Other Nationalities and Commonwealth XIII, and at club level for Wakefield Trinity, Bradford Northern and St Helens, as a wing.

== Early career ==
Jones Jones was born in Rhymney, Monmouthshire, Wales and had a brief career in rugby union with hometown club Rhymney RFC in the South Wales Valleys, but it was in athletics that he looked set to excel until switching to rugby league.

Jones won the bronze medal in the men's 4 x 100 metres relay at the 1962 European Championships in Belgrade, Yugoslavia, alongside Alf Meakin, Ron Jones and David Jones. He also won a bronze medal in the 4 x 100 metres relay while competing for Wales at the 1962 British Empire and Commonwealth Games.

The following year he became the British 100 yards champion after winning the British AAA Championships title at the 1963 AAA Championships.

He had been touted as a potential Olympian for 1964 but was invited to try out for Wakefield Trinity in 1964. He had been a member of the Great Britain 4 x 110 yards relay team and a British record-holder (10.3 seconds).

== Rugby league career ==
Playing under the ironic alias 'A. Walker', he impressed for Wakefield Trinity in reserve team games against Huddersfield and Doncaster and soon took to the sport. Within nine months he was playing for Great Britain, and scored on his international début against France in Perpignan.

Berwyn Jones represented Other Nationalities (RL) while at Wakefield Trinity, he played right wing in the 2–19 defeat by St. Helens at Knowsley Road, St. Helens on Wednesday 27 January 1965, to mark the switching-on of new floodlights, represented Commonwealth XIII while at Wakefield Trinity in 1965 against New Zealand at Crystal Palace National Recreation Centre, London on Wednesday 18 August 1965, and was selected for the 1966 tour of Australia and New Zealand but did not make the Test team due to the form of Barrow's William "Bill" Burgess and Geoffrey "Geoff" Wriglesworth of Leeds.

Berwyn Jones played right wing and scored 2-tries in Wakefield Trinity's 18–2 victory over Leeds in the 1964–65 Yorkshire Cup Final during the 1964–65 season at Fartown Ground, Huddersfield on Saturday 31 October 1964.

He transferred from Wakefield Trinity to Bradford Northern in 1967/68 for £3,000, where he was joined by Leeds' Geoff Wrigglesworth. The pair formed a potent right wing/centre partnership. Jones scored 26 tries that season, his best haul.

== Retirement ==
He transferred from Bradford Northern to St. Helens during 1969 but scored just two tries before announcing a premature retirement.

Jones died on 13 January 2007 at his home in [Ross-on-Wye],[Hertfordshire] at the age of 66 after suffering with motor neurone disease.
