= Heinz Schumann =

German sprinter

Personal information
- Nationality: German
- Born: 6 August 1936 (age 89) São Paulo, Brazil

Sport
- Sport: Sprinting
- Event: 100 metres

Heinz Schumann (born 6 August 1936) is a German sprinter. He competed in the men's 100 metres at the 1964 Summer Olympics. He was born in Brazil to German parents.
