= Csaba Csutorás =

Hungarian sprinter

Personal information
- Born: 13 September 1937 Budapest, Hungary
- Died: 25 August 2014 (aged 76)

Sport
- Sport: Track and field
Medal record
Representing Hungary
Summer Universiade
Gold medal – first place	1963 Porto Alegre	4x100m relay
Silver medal – second place	1965 Budapest	4x400m relay

Csaba Csutorás (13 September 1937 – 25 August 2014) was a Hungarian sprinter who competed in the 1960 Summer Olympics and in the 1964 Summer Olympics.
