= Athletics at the 1956 Summer Olympics – Men's 200 metres =

Men's 200 metres at the Games of the XVI Olympiad
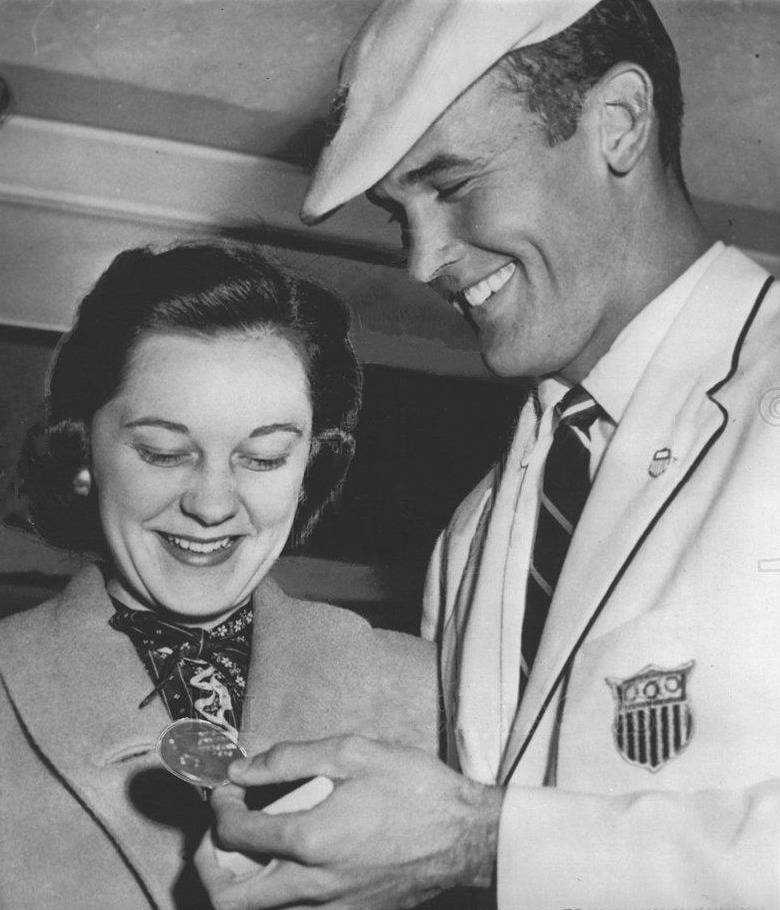
- Bobby Morrow (right)
- Venue: Melbourne Cricket Ground
- Dates: 26 November 1956 & 27 November 1956
- Competitors: 67 from 32 nations
- Winning time: 20.6 =WR OR

Medalists
1st place, gold medalist(s)		Bobby Morrow; United States
2nd place, silver medalist(s)		Andy Stanfield; United States
3rd place, bronze medalist(s)		Thane Baker; United States

Video on YouTube Official Video @20:55

The men's 200 metres was an event at the 1956 Summer Olympics in Melbourne. There were 67 competitors from 32 countries. The first and second rounds were held on Monday 26 November and the semifinals and final on Tuesday 27 November. The maximum number of athletes per nation had been set at 3 since the 1930 Olympic Congress.

Even though it had been a part of the Olympics, the IAAF had only certified world records for the 200 meters around the bend since 1951. Both claimants to the record Andy Stanfield and Thane Baker were in this final. Stanfield took a slight lead from the gun, making up the stagger on Jose Telles da Conceicao to his outside just past halfway through the turn. Inside of him, 100 meter champion Bobby Morrow slowly accelerated and caught Stanfield. Coming off the turn, Morrow had almost a meter advantage. Two meters back, Baker was in a battle with Michael Agostini. Down the final straight, Morrow opened up another meter to take the win by 0.22 seconds. Baker separated from Agostini and made a late run at Stanfield, coming up a couple of feet short.

Morrow's hand time of 20.6 second equalled the world record. The American sweep was the second consecutive and fourth overall sweep for the United States; Morrow's gold was the fifth consecutive and 10th overall for the nation. Stanfield and Baker were the third and fourth men to earn multiple medals in the 200 metres.

== Background ==
This was the 12th appearance of the event, which was not held at the first Olympics in 1896 but has been on the program ever since. Two of the six finalists from the 1952 Games returned: gold medalist Andy Stanfield and silver medalist Thane Baker, both of the United States. The third member of the 1952 American sweep, James Gathers, had been replaced by Bobby Morrow. Morrow and Dave Sime had been favorites early in the year, but Sime was injured and did not make the Olympic team.

The Bahamas, Ethiopia, Guyana, Liberia, Malaya, Puerto Rico, Singapore, and Uganda each made their debut in the event; East and West Germany competed as the United Team of Germany for the first time. The United States made its 12th appearance, the only nation to have competed at each edition of the 200 metres to date.

== Competition format ==
The competition used the four round format introduced in 1920: heats, quarterfinals, semifinals, and a final. There were 12 heats of between 2 and 7 runners each, with the top 2 men in each advancing to the quarterfinals. The quarterfinals consisted of 4 heats of 6 athletes each; the 3 fastest men in each heat advanced to the semifinals. There were 2 semifinals, each with 6 runners. In that round, the top 3 athletes advanced. The final had 6 runners. The races were run on a 400 metre track.

== Records ==
Prior to the competition, the existing world (curved track) and Olympic records were as follows.

World record	Andy Stanfield (USA)	20.6	Los Angeles, United States	28 June 1952
Olympic record	Jesse Owens (USA)	20.7	Berlin, Germany	5 August 1936

Bobby Morrow's hand-timed final run of 20.6 seconds was equal to the world record and set a new Olympic record.

== Schedule ==
All times are Australian Eastern Standard Time (UTC+10)

Date	Time	Round
Tuesday, 26 November 1956	14:30; 17:40	Heats; Quarterfinals
Wednesday, 27 November 1956	15:00; 17:00	Semifinals; Final

== Results ==
=== Heats ===
Twelve heats were held, the two fastest in each would qualify for the quarterfinals.

==== Heat 1 ====
Rank	Athlete	Nation	Time	Notes
1	Jose Telles da Conceicao	Brazil	21.61	Q
2	Manfred Germar	United Team of Germany	21.88	Q
3	René Ahumada	Mexico	21.96	
4	Mel Spence	Jamaica	22.13	
5	Jean-Pierre Goudeau	France	22.13	
—	Voitto Hellsten	Finland	DNS	

==== Heat 2 ====
Rank	Athlete	Nation	Time	Notes
1	Karl-Friedrich Haas	United Team of Germany	21.56	Q
2	Václav Janeček	Czechoslovakia	21.85	Q
3	Douglas Winston	Australia	22.20	
4	Milkha Singh	India	22.47	
5	Kyohei Ushio	Japan	22.64	
—	Carlos Sierra	Colombia	DNS	
—	Zenon Baranowski	Poland	DNS	

==== Heat 3 ====
Rank	Athlete	Nation	Time	Notes
1	Mike Agostini	Trinidad and Tobago	21.80	Q
2	Vincenzo Lombardo	Italy	21.94	Q
3	Yuriy Konovalov	Soviet Union	22.09	
4	Josef Trousil	Czechoslovakia	22.54	
5	Legesse Beyene	Ethiopia	23.63	
6	Manun Bumroongpruck	Thailand	24.59	
—	James Roberts	Liberia	DSQ	

==== Heat 4 ====
Rank	Athlete	Nation	Time	Notes
1	Andy Stanfield	United States	21.69	Q
2	Sergio D'Asnasch	Italy	22.35	Q
3	Muhammad Sharif Butt	Pakistan	22.38	
4	Fred Hammer	Luxembourg	22.73	
5	Negussie Roba	Ethiopia	23.89	
—	Apolinar Solórzano	Venezuela	DSQ	
—	Norberto Cruz	Puerto Rico	DNS	

==== Heat 5 ====
Rank	Athlete	Nation	Time	Notes
1	Abdul Khaliq	Pakistan	21.32	Q
2	Maurice Rae	New Zealand	21.57	Q
3	Joao Pires Sobrinho	Brazil	21.67	
4	Tom Robinson	Bahamas	21.76	
5	Sándor Jakabfy	Hungary	21.78	
6	Malcolm Spence	Jamaica	21.86	
—	René Farine	Switzerland	DNS	

==== Heat 6 ====
Rank	Athlete	Nation	Time	Notes
1	Kanji Akagi	Japan	22.26	Q
2	Jorge Machado de Barros	Brazil	22.30	Q
—	Bruno Urben	Switzerland	DNS	
—	Stan Levenson	Canada	DNS	
—	Géza Varasdi	Hungary	DNS	
—	Hilmar Þorbjörnsson	Iceland	DNS	
—	Sinnayah Karuppiah Jarabalan	Malaya	DNS	

==== Heat 7 ====
Rank	Athlete	Nation	Time	Notes
1	Thane Baker	United States	21.92	Q
2	Béla Goldoványi	Hungary	22.08	Q
3	Bjørn Nilsen	Norway	22.33	
4	Oliver Hunter	Guyana	22.54	
5	Giovanni Ghiselli	Italy	22.68	
6	Hailou Abbebe	Ethiopia	23.25	
—	Alfonso Bruno	Venezuela	DNS	

==== Heat 8 ====
Rank	Athlete	Nation	Time	Notes
1	Vilem Mandlik	Czechoslovakia	21.79	Q
2	Hector Hogan	Australia	21.97	Q
3	David Segal	Great Britain	22.22	
4	Joseph Foreman	Canada	22.28	
5	Kesavan Soon	Singapore	23.33	
6	Lee Kah Fook	Malaya	23.94	

==== Heat 9 ====
Rank	Athlete	Nation	Time	Notes
1	Bobby Morrow	United States	21.95	Q
2	Edward Szmidt	Poland	22.03	Q
3	Graham Gipson	Australia	22.06	
4	Akira Kiyofuji	Japan	22.56	
5	Abdul Aziz	Pakistan	22.98	
—	Ghanim Mahmoud	Iraq	DNS	

==== Heat 10 ====
Rank	Athlete	Nation	Time	Notes
1	Boris Tokarev	Soviet Union	21.62	Q
2	Brian Shenton	Great Britain	21.85	Q
3	Rafael Romero	Venezuela	21.87	
4	Janusz Jarzembowski	Poland	21.91	
5	Joseph Goddard	Trinidad and Tobago	22.23	
6	Eero Kivelä	Finland	22.56	
7	Benjamin Kiyini Nduga	Uganda	22.89	

==== Heat 11 ====
Rank	Athlete	Nation	Time	Notes
1	Constantin Lissenko	France	22.06	Q
2	Iván Rodríguez	Puerto Rico	22.06	Q
3	Roy Sandstrom	Great Britain	22.18	
4	Pentti Rekola	Finland	22.22	
5	Jack Parrington	Canada	22.61	
6	Montri Srinaka	Thailand	23.88	
7	Emmanuel Putu	Liberia	24.33	

==== Heat 12 ====
Rank	Athlete	Nation	Time	Notes
1	Leonhard Pohl	United Team of Germany	21.78	Q
2	Leonid Bartenev	Soviet Union	21.94	Q
3	Yves Camus	France	22.37	
4	Paiboon Vacharapan	Thailand	23.92	
5	Richard Estick	Jamaica	25.81	
—	Edmund Turton	Trinidad and Tobago	DNS	

=== Quarterfinals ===
Four heats were held, the three fastest in each would qualify for the semifinals.

==== Quarterfinal 1 ====
Rank	Athlete	Nation	Time	Notes
1	Abdul Khaliq	Pakistan	21.34	Q
2	Michael Agostini	Trinidad and Tobago	21.35	Q
3	Leonhard Pohl	United Team of Germany	21.49	Q
4	Leonid Bartenev	Soviet Union	21.53	
5	Béla Goldoványi	Hungary	21.64	
6	Edward Szmidt	Poland	21.73	

==== Quarterfinal 2 ====
Rank	Athlete	Nation	Time	Notes
1	Andy Stanfield	United States	21.22	Q
2	Boris Tokarev	Soviet Union	21.42	Q
3	Jose Telles da Conceicao	Brazil	21.46	Q
4	Vincenzo Lombardo	Italy	21.53	
5	Kanji Akagi	Japan	22.03	
—	Constantin Lissenko	France	DNS	

==== Quarterfinal 3 ====
Rank	Athlete	Nation	Time	Notes
1	Thane Baker	United States	21.34	Q
2	Vilem Mandlik	Czechoslovakia	21.56	Q
3	Karl-Friedrich Haas	United Team of Germany	21.68	Q
4	Hector Hogan	Australia	21.90	
5	Iván Rodríguez	Puerto Rico	22.16	
6	Sergio D'Asnasch	Italy	22.82	

==== Quarterfinal 4 ====
Rank	Athlete	Nation	Time	Notes
1	Bobby Morrow	United States	22.03	Q
2	Maurice Rae	New Zealand	22.12	Q
3	Brian Shenton	Great Britain	22.15	Q
4	Václav Janeček	Czechoslovakia	22.26	
5	Jorge Machado de Barros	Brazil	23.88	
—	Manfred Germar	United Team of Germany	DNS	

=== Semifinals ===
Two semifinals were held, the three fastest of which would qualify for the final.

==== Semifinal 1 ====
Rank	Athlete	Nation	Time	Notes
1	Thane Baker	United States	21.21	Q
2	Bobby Morrow	United States	21.43	Q
3	Jose Telles da Conceicao	Brazil	21.53	Q
4	Abdul Khaliq	Pakistan	21.58	
5	Karl-Friedrich Haas	United Team of Germany	21.74	
6	Maurice Rae	New Zealand	21.75	

==== Semifinal 2 ====
Rank	Athlete	Nation	Time	Notes
1	Andy Stanfield	United States	21.35	Q
2	Michael Agostini	Trinidad and Tobago	21.48	Q
3	Boris Tokarev	Soviet Union	21.50	Q
4	Leonhard Pohl	United Team of Germany	21.64	
5	Vilem Mandlik	Czechoslovakia	21.74	
6	Brian Shenton	Great Britain	22.08	

=== Final ===
Rank	Athlete	Nation	Time	Notes
1st place, gold medalist(s)	Bobby Morrow	United States	20.75	=WR, OR
2nd place, silver medalist(s)	Andy Stanfield	United States	20.97	
3rd place, bronze medalist(s)	Thane Baker	United States	21.05	
4	Michael Agostini	Trinidad and Tobago	21.35	
5	Boris Tokarev	Soviet Union	21.42	
6	Jose Telles da Conceicao	Brazil	21.56	
