= Athletics at the 1956 Summer Olympics – Men's 100 metres =

Men's 100 metres at the Games of the XVI Olympiad
- Venue: Melbourne Cricket Ground; Melbourne, Australia
- Dates: 23 November 1956 (heats, quarterfinals); 24 November 1956 (semifinals, final)
- Competitors: 65 from 31 nations
- Winning time: 10.5 seconds

Medalists
| 1st place, gold medalist(s) | | Bobby Morrow | United States |
| 2nd place, silver medalist(s) | | Thane Baker | United States |
| 3rd place, bronze medalist(s) | | Hec Hogan | Australia |

Video on YouTube Official Video @24:28

The men's 100 metres event at the 1956 Olympic Games in Melbourne, Australia, was held at the Melbourne Cricket Ground on 23 and 24 November. Sixty-five athletes from 31 nations competed; each nation was limited to three athletes. The final was won by American Bobby Morrow, marking the fifth consecutive victory by a different American. Hec Hogan of Australia won that country's first medal in the event since 1900. The competition took place in strong winds, with the final run into a 2.5 m/s (5.6 mph) headwind.

== Background ==
This was the thirteenth time the event was held, having appeared at every Olympics since the first in 1896. None of the finalists from 1952 returned. Notable entrants were Americans Bobby Morrow (NCAA champion, U.S. Olympic trial champion, and heavy favorite) and Ira Murchison (world record co-holder); Dave Sime was injured and did not make the American team.

The Bahamas, Ethiopia, Indonesia, Liberia, Malay, Singapore, and Ethiopia were represented in the event for the first time. In addition, German athletes competed as the "United Team" for the first time, though pre-World War II Germany had competed many times and West Germany had competed as "Germany" in 1952. The United States was the only nation to have appeared at each of the first thirteen Olympic men's 100 metres events.

== Competition format ==
The event retained the four round format from 1920 to 1952: heats, quarterfinals, semifinals, and a final. There were 12 heats, of 4–6 athletes each, with the top 2 in each heat advancing to the quarterfinals. The 24 quarterfinalists were placed into 4 heats of 6 athletes. The top 3 in each quarterfinal advanced to the semifinals. There were 2 heats of 6 semifinalists, once again with the top 3 advancing to the 6-man final.

== Records ==
Prior to the competition, the existing World and Olympic records were as follows.

| World record | 10.1 | (United States) Willie Williams | Berlin, Germany | 3 August 1956 |
| World record | 10.1 | (United States) Ira Murchison | Berlin, Germany | 4 August 1956 |
| World record | 10.1 | (United States) Leamon King | Ontario, United States | 20 October 1956 |
| World record | 10.1 | (United States) Leamon King | Santa Ana, United States | 27 October 1956 |
| Olympic record | 10.3 | (United States) Eddie Tolan | Los Angeles, USA | 1 August 1932 |
| Olympic record | 10.3 | (United States) Ralph Metcalfe | Los Angeles, USA | 1 August 1932 |
| Olympic record | 10.3 | (United States) Jesse Owens | Berlin, Germany | 2 August 1936 |
| Olympic record | 10.3 | (United States) Harrison Dillard | London, United Kingdom | 31 July 1948 |

Despite headwinds, Ira Murchison and Bobby Morrow each equalled the Olympic record of 10.3 seconds (hand-timed) in the quarterfinals. Morrow did it again in the semifinals.

== Results ==
=== Heats ===
The fastest two runners in each of the twelve heats advanced to the quarterfinal round.

==== Heat 1 ====
Wind: 0.0 m/s

| Rank | Athlete | Nation | Time | Notes |
|---|---|---|---|---|
| 1 | Ira Murchison | United States | 10.67 | Q |
| 2 | Jan Jarzembowski | Poland | 10.95 | Q |
| 3 | Hilmar Þorbjörnsson | Iceland | 11.12 | |
| 4 | Mario Colarossi | Italy | 11.14 | |
| 5 | René Ahumada | Mexico | 11.26 | |
| 6 | Raja bin Ngah Ali | Malaya | 11.41 | |
| — | René Farine | Switzerland | DNS | |

==== Heat 2 ====
Wind: -1.2 m/s

| Rank | Athlete | Nation | Time | Notes |
|---|---|---|---|---|
| 1 | Mike Agostini | Trinidad and Tobago | 10.98 | Q |
| 2 | Luigi Gnocchi | Italy | 11.01 | Q |
| 3 | Titus Erinle | Nigeria | 11.09 | |
| 4 | Jorge de Barros | Brazil | 11.15 | |
| 5 | Vanchak Voradilok | Thailand | 11.78 | |
| 6 | Negussie Roba | Ethiopia | 12.07 | |

==== Heat 3 ====
Wind: -2.8 m/s

| Rank | Athlete | Nation | Time | Notes |
|---|---|---|---|---|
| 1 | Maurice Rae | New Zealand | 10.84 | Q |
| 2 | Abdul Khaliq | Pakistan | 10.97 | Q |
| 3 | Manfred Steinbach | United Team of Germany | 10.99 | |
| 4 | Rafael Romero | Venezuela | 11.14 | |
| 5 | Evaristo Iglesias | Cuba | 11.50 | |
| — | Walter Tschudi | Switzerland | DNS | |

==== Heat 4 ====
Wind: 0.0 m/s

| Rank | Athlete | Nation | Time | Notes |
|---|---|---|---|---|
| 1 | Ben Nduga | Uganda | 10.88 | Q |
| 2 | Ken Box | Great Britain | 10.96 | Q |
| 3 | Kyohei Ushio | Japan | 11.09 | |
| 4 | Kesavan Soon | Singapore | 11.35 | |
| 5 | Jack Parrington | Canada | 11.62 | |
| — | Norberto Cruz | Puerto Rico | DNS | |

==== Heat 5 ====
Wind: 0.1 m/s

| Rank | Athlete | Nation | Time | Notes |
|---|---|---|---|---|
| 1 | Marian Foik | Poland | 10.88 | Q |
| 2 | Boris Tokarev | Soviet Union | 11.09 | Q |
| 3 | Franco Galbiati | Italy | 11.13 | |
| 4 | Tom Robinson | Bahamas | 11.30 | |
| 5 | Jalal Gozal | Indonesia | 11.45 | |
| 6 | James Roberts | Liberia | 11.45 | |

==== Heat 6 ====
Wind: -0.5 m/s

| Rank | Athlete | Nation | Time | Notes |
|---|---|---|---|---|
| 1 | Manfred Germar | United Team of Germany | 10.91 | Q |
| 2 | Ray Land | Australia | 11.05 | Q |
| 3 | Keith Gardner | Jamaica | 11.22 | |
| 4 | Alain David | France | 11.24 | |
| 5 | Emmanuel Putu | Liberia | 11.44 | |
| 6 | Beyene Legesse | Ethiopia | 11.94 | |

==== Heat 7 ====
Wind: -0.6 m/s

| Rank | Athlete | Nation | Time | Notes |
|---|---|---|---|---|
| 1 | Leonid Bartenyev | Soviet Union | 10.93 | Q |
| 2 | Béla Goldoványi | Hungary | 11.02 | Q |
| 3 | Clive Bonas | Venezuela | 11.17 | |
| 4 | Gavin Carragher | Australia | 11.36 | |
| 5 | Thomas Obi | Nigeria | 11.47 | |
| 6 | Bjørn Nilsen | Norway | 11.58 | |

==== Heat 8 ====
Wind: 0.0 m/s

| Rank | Athlete | Nation | Time | Notes |
|---|---|---|---|---|
| 1 | Hector Hogan | Australia | 10.72 | Q |
| 2 | René Bonino | France | 10.96 | Q |
| 3 | Géza Varasdi | Hungary | 11.00 | |
| 4 | Akira Kiyofuji | Japan | 11.00 | |
| — | Edward Szmidt | Poland | DNS | |
| — | Alfonso Bruno | Venezuela | DNS | |

==== Heat 9 ====
Wind: -0.9 m/s

| Rank | Athlete | Nation | Time | Notes |
|---|---|---|---|---|
| 1 | Thane Baker | United States | 10.93 | Q |
| 2 | Edmund Turton | Trinidad and Tobago | 11.38 | Q |
| 3 | Sinnayah Karuppiah Jarabalan | Malaya | 11.56 | |
| 4 | Tan Eng Yoon | Singapore | 11.63 | |
| — | László Kiss | Hungary | DNS | |
| — | Ghanim Mahmoud | Iraq | DNS | |

==== Heat 10 ====
Wind: -1.2 m/s

| Rank | Athlete | Nation | Time | Notes |
|---|---|---|---|---|
| 1 | Stan Levenson | Canada | 10.94 | Q |
| 2 | Heinz Fütterer | United Team of Germany | 11.10 | Q |
| 3 | João Pires Sobrinho | Brazil | 11.14 | |
| 4 | Joe Goddard | Trinidad and Tobago | 11.19 | |
| 5 | Oliver Hunter | Guyana | 11.22 | |
| 6 | Ghulam Raziq | Pakistan | 11.26 | |

==== Heat 11 ====
Wind: -0.7 m/s

| Rank | Athlete | Nation | Time | Notes |
|---|---|---|---|---|
| 1 | Edward Ajado | Nigeria | 11.01 | Q |
| 2 | Roy Sandstrom | Great Britain | 11.05 | Q |
| 3 | Dick Harding | Canada | 11.20 | |
| 4 | Muhammad Sharif Butt | Pakistan | 11.26 | |
| 5 | Abebe Hailou | Ethiopia | 11.54 | |
| 6 | Sneh Wongchaoom | Thailand | 11.95 | |

==== Heat 12 ====
Wind: 0.0 m/s

| Rank | Athlete | Nation | Time | Notes |
|---|---|---|---|---|
| 1 | Bobby Morrow | United States | 10.90 | Q |
| 2 | Yuriy Konovalov | Soviet Union | 11.04 | Q |
| 3 | David Segal | Great Britain | 11.19 | |
| 4 | Paiboon Vacharapan | Thailand | 11.27 | |
| 5 | Lee Kah Fook | Malaya | 11.84 | |
| — | Fritz Vogelsang | Switzerland | DNS | |

=== Quarterfinals ===
The fastest three runners in each of the four heats advanced to the semifinal round.

==== Quarterfinal 1 ====
Wind: -1.4 m/s

| Rank | Athlete | Nation | Time | Notes |
|---|---|---|---|---|
| 1 | Bobby Morrow | United States | 10.55 | Q, =OR (10.3 hand) |
| 2 | Mike Agostini | Trinidad and Tobago | 10.75 | Q |
| 3 | Maurice Rae | New Zealand | 10.78 | Q |
| 4 | Béla Goldoványi | Hungary | 10.95 | |
| 5 | Heinz Fütterer | United Team of Germany | 10.99 | |
| 6 | Ray Land | Australia | 11.15 | |

==== Quarterfinal 2 ====
Wind: 0.0 m/s

| Rank | Athlete | Nation | Time | Notes |
|---|---|---|---|---|
| 1 | Ira Murchison | United States | 10.55 | Q, =OR (10.3 hand) |
| 2 | Abdul Khaliq | Pakistan | 10.78 | Q |
| 3 | Yuriy Konovalov | Soviet Union | 10.93 | Q |
| 4 | Luigi Gnocchi | Italy | 10.96 | |
| 5 | Edmund Turton | Trinidad and Tobago | 11.37 | |
| 6 | Ben Nduga | Uganda | 12.95 | |

==== Quarterfinal 3 ====
Wind: -1.0 m/s

| Rank | Athlete | Nation | Time | Notes |
|---|---|---|---|---|
| 1 | Hec Hogan | Australia | 10.78 | Q |
| 2 | Boris Tokarev | Soviet Union | 10.87 | Q |
| 3 | Stan Levenson | Canada | 10.93 | Q |
| 4 | Jan Jarzembowski | Poland | 10.98 | |
| 5 | Edward Ajado | Nigeria | 11.02 | |
| 6 | Ken Box | Great Britain | 11.45 | |

==== Quarterfinal 4 ====
Wind: -2.2 m/s

| Rank | Athlete | Nation | Time | Notes |
|---|---|---|---|---|
| 1 | Thane Baker | United States | 10.62 | Q |
| 2 | Manfred Germar | Germany | 10.80 | Q |
| 3 | Marian Foik | Poland | 10.83 | Q |
| 4 | Leonid Bartenev | Soviet Union | 10.84 | |
| 5 | René Bonino | France | 10.96 | |
| 6 | Roy Sandstrom | Great Britain | 11.03 | |

=== Semifinals ===
The fastest three runners in each of the two heats advanced to the final round.

==== Semifinal 1 ====
Wind: -2.3 m/s

| Rank | Athlete | Nation | Time | Notes |
|---|---|---|---|---|
| 1 | Ira Murchison | United States | 10.79 | Q |
| 2 | Mike Agostini | Trinidad and Tobago | 10.79 | Q |
| 3 | Manfred Germar | United Team of Germany | 10.85 | Q |
| 4 | Abdul Khaliq | Pakistan | 10.93 | |
| 5 | Stan Levenson | Canada | 10.94 | |
| 6 | Yuriy Konovalov | Soviet Union | 11.11 | |

==== Semifinal 2 ====
Wind: -1.1 m/s

| Rank | Athlete | Nation | Time | Notes |
|---|---|---|---|---|
| 1 | Bobby Morrow | United States | 10.52 | Q, =OR (10.3 hand) |
| 2 | Thane Baker | United States | 10.61 | Q |
| 3 | Hec Hogan | Australia | 10.62 | Q |
| 4 | Maurice Rae | New Zealand | 10.68 | |
| 5 | Marian Foik | Poland | 10.84 | |
| 6 | Boris Tokarev | Soviet Union | 10.91 | |

=== Final ===
In lane 4, Bobby Morrow was out fast, sandwiched by his teammates Thane Baker in lane 6 and Ira Murchison in lane 1. Morrow just ran away from the field. Baker edged ahead of Murchison to get silver, and running before an Australian crowd, Hec Hogan came from behind to nip Murchison at the line. While Morrow was almost two metres ahead of Baker at the finish, the hand timing of the day gave them the same time of 10.5; the electronic timing system showed the margin to be a more accurate 0.15 of a second.

Wind: -2.5 m/s

| Rank | Athlete | Nation | Time (hand) | Time (automatic) |
|---|---|---|---|---|
| 1st place, gold medalist(s) | Bobby Morrow | United States | 10.5 | 10.62 |
| 2nd place, silver medalist(s) | Thane Baker | United States | 10.5 | 10.77 |
| 3rd place, bronze medalist(s) | Hec Hogan | Australia | 10.6 | 10.77 |
| 4 | Ira Murchison | United States | 10.6 | 10.79 |
| 5 | Manfred Germar | United Team of Germany | 10.7 | 10.86 |
| 6 | Mike Agostini | Trinidad and Tobago | 10.7 | 10.88 |
