= Athletics at the 1956 Summer Olympics – Men's 4 × 100 metres relay =

Men's 4 × 100 metres relay at the Games of the XVI Olympiad
- Venue: Melbourne Cricket Ground
- Dates: 30 November 1956 (round 1); December 1, 1956 (semi-finals & final)
- Competitors: from 18 nations
- Teams: 72
- Winning time: 39.60 WR

Medalists
1st place, gold medalist(s)		Ira Murchison, Leamon King, Thane Baker, Bobby Morrow	United States
2nd place, silver medalist(s)		Leonid Bartenev, Boris Tokarev, Yuriy Konovalov, Vladimir Sukharev	Soviet Union
3rd place, bronze medalist(s)		Lothar Knörzer, Leonhard Pohl, Heinz Fütterer, Manfred Germar	United Team of Germany

Video on YouTube Official Video @1:14:55

The men's 4 × 100 metres relay was an event at the 1956 Summer Olympics in Melbourne, Australia. Eighteen nations took part in the competition.

== Results ==
=== Heats ===
Rank	Heat	Nation	Athletes	Time (hand)	Time (automatic)	Notes
1	1	United States	Ira Murchison, Leamon King, Thane Baker, Bobby Morrow	40.5	40.53	Q
2	2	Australia	Gavin Carragher, Edward McGlynn, Raymond Land, Hector Hogan	40.6	40.72	Q
3	3	Soviet Union	Leonid Bartenev, Boris Tokarev, Yuriy Konovalov, Vladimir Sukharev	40.7	40.77	Q
4	4	Poland	Marian Foik, Janusz Jarzembowski, Edward Szmidt, Zenon Baranowski	40.9	40.97	Q
5	2	France	René Bonino, Constantin Lissenko, Jocelyn Delecourt, Alain David	40.8	40.99	Q
6	2	United Team of Germany	Lothar Knörzer, Leonhard Pohl, Heinz Fütterer, Manfred Germar	40.8	41.00	Q
7	3	Italy	Franco Galbiati, Giovanni Ghiselli, Luigi Gnocchi, Vincenzo Lombardo	40.9	41.07	Q
8	1	Great Britain	Kenneth Box, Roy Sandstrom, David Segal, Brian Shenton	41.2	41.30	Q
9	1	Pakistan	Muhammad Sharif Butt, Ghulam Raziq, Abdul Aziz, Abdul Khaliq	41.3	41.42	Q
10	4	Hungary	Sandor Jakabfy, Geza Varasdi, György Csanyi, Béla Goldoványi	41.5	41.45	Q
11	3	Brazil	João Pires Sobrinho, José Telles da Conceição, Ary de Sá, Jorge de Barros	41.6	41.70	Q
12	3	Canada	Stanley Levenson, Richard Harding, John Parrington, Joseph Foreman	41.7	41.75	
13	1	Venezuela	Alfonso Bruno, Apolinar Solórzano, Clive Bonas, Rafael Romero	42.0	42.10	
14	4	Japan	Masaji Tajima, Kanji Akagi, Akira Kiyofuji, Kyohei Ushio	42.2	42.30	Q
15	2	Thailand	Vanchak Voradilok, Phaibulya Vacharabhan, Montri Srinaka, Snay Wongchaoom	44.2	44.37	
16	3	Ethiopia	Beyene Legesse, Bekele Haile, Robba Nigouse, Abebe Hailou	44.3	44.47	
17	1	Liberia	Edward Martins, Emmanuel Gbecy Putu, George Johnson, James Roberts	44.7	44.96	
	4	Nigeria	Titus Abimbola Erinle, Rafio Adio Oluwa, Edward Alabi Ajado, Abdul Karim Amu	DQ	–	
	–	Trinidad and Tobago		DNS	–	

=== Semifinals ===
Rank	Heat	Nation	Athletes	Time (hand)	Time (automatic)	Notes
1	1	United States	Ira Murchison, Leamon King, Thane Baker, Bobby Morrow	40.3	40.34	Q
2	2	Soviet Union	Leonid Bartenev, Boris Tokarev, Yuriy Konovalov, Vladimir Sukharev	40.3	40.36	Q
3	2	United Team of Germany	Lothar Knörzer, Leonhard Pohl, Heinz Fütterer, Manfred Germar	40.5	40.64	Q
4	2	Great Britain	Kenneth Box, Roy Sandstrom, David Segal, Brian Shenton	40.6	40.68	Q
5	2	Australia	Gavin Carragher, Edward McGlynn, Raymond Land, Hector Hogan	40.8	40.72	
6	2	Pakistan	Muhammad Sharif Butt, Ghulam Raziq, Abdul Aziz, Abdul Khaliq	40.8	40.78	
7	1	Poland	Marian Foik, Janusz Jarzembowski, Edward Szmidt, Zenon Baranowski	41.0	41.12	Q
8	1	Italy	Franco Galbiati, Giovanni Ghiselli, Luigi Gnocchi, Vincenzo Lombardo	41.1	41.14	Q
9	1	France	René Bonino, Constantin Lissenko, Jocelyn Delecourt, Alain David	41.3	41.37	
10	1	Hungary	Sandor Jakabfy, Geza Varasdi, György Csanyi, Béla Goldoványi	41.5	41.51	
11	2	Japan	Masaji Tajima, Kanji Akagi, Akira Kiyofuji, Kyohei Ushio	41.3	41.57	
12	1	Brazil	João Pires Sobrinho, José Telles da Conceição, Ary de Sá, Jorge de Barros	43.8	43.87	

=== Final ===
Rank	Nation	Athletes	Time (hand)	Time (automatic)	Notes
1st place, gold medalist(s)	United States	Ira Murchison, Leamon King, Thane Baker, Bobby Morrow	39.5	39.60	WR
2nd place, silver medalist(s)	Soviet Union	Leonid Bartenev, Boris Tokarev, Yuriy Konovalov, Vladimir Sukharev	39.8	39.93	
3rd place, bronze medalist(s)	United Team of Germany	Lothar Knörzer, Leonhard Pohl, Heinz Fütterer, Manfred Germar	40.3	40.34	
4	Italy	Franco Galbiati, Giovanni Ghiselli, Luigi Gnocchi, Vincenzo Lombardo	40.3	40.43	
5	Great Britain	Kenneth Box, Roy Sandstrom, David Segal, Brian Shenton	40.6	40.74	
6	Poland	Marian Foik, Janusz Jarzembowski, Edward Szmidt, Zenon Baranowski	40.6	40.75	
