= 1958 European Athletics Championships – Men's 100 metres =

Men's 100 metres at the 1958 European Athletics Championships
- Venue: Stockholms Olympiastadion
- Location: Stockholm
- Dates: 19 August (heats); 20 August (semifinals & final)
- Competitors: 29 from 18 nations
- Winning time: 10.35

Medalists
gold medal	Armin Hary	West Germany
silver medal	Manfred Germar	West Germany
bronze medal	Peter Radford	Great Britain

The men's 100 metres at the 1958 European Athletics Championships was held in Stockholm, Sweden, at Stockholms Olympiastadion on 19 and 20 August 1958.

== Participation ==
According to an unofficial count, 29 athletes from 18 countries participated in the event.

- Austria (2)
- Belgium (1)
- Bulgaria (1)
- Czechoslovakia (2)
- Denmark (1)
- France (2)
- Greece (1)
- Hungary (2)
- Iceland (1)
- Italy (2)
- Norway (1)
- Poland (2)
- Soviet Union (2)
- Sweden (2)
- Switzerland (2)
- Turkey (1)
- Great Britain (2)
- West Germany (2)

== Results ==
=== Heats ===
19 August

==== Heat 1 ====
Wind: 1.1 m/s

Rank	Name	Nationality	Time	Notes
1	Manfred Germar	West Germany	10.9	Q
2	Livio Berruti	Italy	10.9	Q
3	Sven-Olof Westlund	Sweden	11.0	Q
4	Nikolaos Georgopoulos	Greece	11.1	
5	Hans Wehrli	Switzerland	11.4	
			Wind: +1.1 m/s	

==== Heat 2 ====
Rank	Name	Nationality	Time	Notes
1	Bjørn Nilsen	Norway	10.8	Q
2	Heinz Müller	Switzerland	10.8	Q
3	Roy Sandstrom	Great Britain	10.8	Q
4	Jacques Vercruysse	Belgium	10.9	
5	Edward Szmidt	Poland	11.0	
			Wind: +0.3 m/s	

==== Heat 3 ====
Rank	Name	Nationality	Time	Notes
1	Peter Radford	Great Britain	10.6	Q
2	Marian Foik	Poland	10.8	Q
3	Mikhail Bachvarov	Bulgaria	11.0	Q
4	Václav Janeček	Czechoslovakia	11.1	
5	Aydın Onur	Turkey	11.3	
			Wind: +0.5 m/s	

==== Heat 4 ====
Rank	Name	Nationality	Time	Notes
1	Jocelyn Delecour	France	10.4	CR, Q
2	Björn Malmroos	Sweden	10.8	Q
3	Salvatore Giannone	Italy	10.8	Q
4	Sándor Jakabfy	Hungary	10.9	
5	Richard Schwarzgruber	Austria	11.1	
			Wind: +1.0 m/s	

==== Heat 5 ====
Rank	Name	Nationality	Time	Notes
1	Leonid Bartenyev	Soviet Union	11.0	Q
2	Béla Goldoványi	Hungary	11.1	Q
3	Jan Stesso	Czechoslovakia	11.2	Q
4	Hilmar Þorbjörnsson	Iceland	11.3	
5	Peter Rasmussen	Denmark	11.3	
			Wind: +2.0 m/s	

==== Heat 6 ====
Rank	Name	Nationality	Time	Notes
1	Armin Hary	West Germany	10.7	Q
2	Yuriy Konovalov	Soviet Union	10.7	Q
3	Constantin Lissenko	France	10.9	Q
4	Adolf Huber	Austria	11.0	
			Wind: +1.3 m/s	

=== Semi-finals ===
20 August

==== Semi-final 1 ====
Rank	Name	Nationality	Time	Notes
1	Jocelyn Delecour	France	10.5	Q
2	Marian Foik	Poland	10.7	Q
3	Bjørn Nilsen	Norway	10.8	
4	Livio Berruti	Italy	10.8	
5	Heinz Müller	Switzerland	10.9	
6	Sven-Olof Westlund	Sweden	11.0	
			Wind: +0.6 m/s	

==== Semi-final 2 ====
Rank	Name	Nationality	Time	Notes
1	Peter Radford	Great Britain	10.5	Q
2	Armin Hary	West Germany	10.6	Q
3	Constantin Lissenko	France	10.8	
4	Leonid Bartenyev	Soviet Union	10.8	
5	Jan Stesso	Czechoslovakia	11.1	
6	Salvatore Giannone	Italy	11.1	
			Wind: +1.2 m/s	

==== Semi-final 3 ====
Rank	Name	Nationality	Time	Notes
1	Manfred Germar	West Germany	10.5	Q
2	Yuriy Konovalov	Soviet Union	10.6	Q
3	Roy Sandstrom	Great Britain	10.7	
4	Béla Goldoványi	Hungary	10.7	
5	Björn Malmroos	Sweden	10.8	
6	Mikhail Bachvarov	Bulgaria	10.8	
			Wind: +0.8 m/s	

=== Final ===
20 August

Rank	Name	Nationality	Time	Notes
1st place, gold medalist(s)	Armin Hary	West Germany	10.35	CR
2nd place, silver medalist(s)	Manfred Germar	West Germany	10.4	
3rd place, bronze medalist(s)	Peter Radford	Great Britain	10.4	
4	Jocelyn Delecour	France	10.5	
5	Yuriy Konovalov	Soviet Union	10.7	
6	Marian Foik	Poland	10.9	
			Wind: +1.5 m/s	
