= 1958 European Athletics Championships – Men's 200 metres =

Men's 200 metres at the 1958 European Athletics Championships
- Venue: Stockholm
- Location: Stockholms Olympiastadion
- Dates: 22 August (heats & semi-finals); 23 August (final)
- Competitors: 25 from 18 nations
- Winning time: 21.0

Medalists
gold medal	Manfred Germar	West Germany
silver medal	David Segal	Great Britain
bronze medal	Jocelyn Delecour	France

The men's 200 metres at the 1958 European Athletics Championships was held in Stockholm, Sweden, at Stockholms Olympiastadion on 22 and 23 August 1958.

== Participation ==
According to an unofficial count, 25 athletes from 18 countries participated in the event.

- Austria (2)
- Belgium (1)
- Bulgaria (1)
- Czechoslovakia (1)
- Denmark (1)
- Finland (1)
- France (2)
- Great Britain (2)
- Greece (2)
- Hungary (2)
- Italy (1)
- Norway (1)
- Poland (1)
- Soviet Union (2)
- Sweden (1)
- Switzerland (1)
- Turkey (1)
- West Germany (2)

== Results ==
=== Heats ===
22 August

==== Heat 1 ====
Rank	Name	Nationality	Time	Notes
1	Leonid Bartenyev	Soviet Union	21.7	Q
2	Ernst Vogel	Switzerland	22.2	Q
3	Mikhail Bachvarov	Bulgaria	22.5	Q
4	Aydın Onur	Turkey	22.6	
5	Edmund Burg	West Germany	23.2	
			Wind: +1.0 m/s	

==== Heat 2 ====
Rank	Name	Nationality	Time	Notes
1	György Gyuricza	Hungary	22.4	Q
2	Habib Thiam	France	23.0	Q
3	Adolf Huber	Austria	24.9	Q
			Wind: +1.0 m/s	

==== Heat 3 ====
Rank	Name	Nationality	Time	Notes
1	Vilém Mandlík	Czechoslovakia	21.6	Q
2	Yuriy Konovalov	Soviet Union	21.7	Q
3	Nikolaos Georgopoulos	Greece	21.9	Q
4	Richard Schwarzgruber	Austria	22.4	
			Wind: +0.5 m/s	

==== Heat 4 ====
Rank	Name	Nationality	Time	Notes
1	Manfred Germar	West Germany	21.4	Q
2	Edward Szmidt	Poland	21.9	Q
3	Robbie Brightwell	Great Britain	21.9	Q
4	Jacques Vercruysse	Belgium	22.0	
5	Börje Strand	Finland	22.0	
			Wind: +0.5 m/s	

==== Heat 5 ====
Rank	Name	Nationality	Time	Notes
1	Jocelyn Delecour	France	22.2	Q
2	Béla Goldoványi	Hungary	22.2	Q
3	Vasilios Syllis	Greece	23.1	Q
			Wind: +0.6 m/s	

==== Heat 6 ====
Rank	Name	Nationality	Time	Notes
1	David Segal	Great Britain	21.0	Q
2	Livio Berruti	Italy	21.6	Q
3	Bjørn Nilsen	Norway	21.6	Q
4	Björn Malmroos	Sweden	21.8	
5	Peter Rasmussen	Denmark	22.2	
			Wind: +0.8 m/s	

=== Semi-finals ===
22 August

==== Heat 1 ====
Rank	Name	Nationality	Time	Notes
1	Jocelyn Delecour	France	21.3	Q
2	Robbie Brightwell	Great Britain	21.7	Q
3	Leonid Bartenyev	Soviet Union	21.7	
4	Edward Szmidt	Poland	21.9	
5	György Gyuricza	Hungary	22.4	
6	Ernst Vogel	Switzerland	22.4	
			Wind: 0.0 m/s	

==== Heat 2 ====
Rank	Name	Nationality	Time	Notes
1	Vilém Mandlík	Czechoslovakia	21.0	Q
2	David Segal	Great Britain	21.1	Q
3	Béla Goldoványi	Hungary	21.7	
4	Habib Thiam	France	22.3	
5	Vasilios Syllis	Greece	22.4	
–	Livio Berruti	Italy	DNF	
			Wind: 0.0 m/s	

==== Heat 3 ====
Rank	Name	Nationality	Time	Notes
1	Manfred Germar	West Germany	21.2	Q
2	Yuriy Konovalov	Soviet Union	21.3	Q
3	Bjørn Nilsen	Norway	21.5	
4	Nikolaos Georgopoulos	Greece	21.7	
5	Mikhail Bachvarov	Bulgaria	22.2	
6	Adolf Huber	Austria	22.8	
			Wind: +0.2 m/s	

=== Final ===
23 August

Rank	Name	Nationality	Time	Notes
1st place, gold medalist(s)	Manfred Germar	West Germany	21.0	
2nd place, silver medalist(s)	David Segal	Great Britain	21.3	
3rd place, bronze medalist(s)	Jocelyn Delecour	France	21.3	
4	Vilém Mandlík	Czechoslovakia	21.4	
5	Robbie Brightwell	Great Britain	21.9	
6	Yuriy Konovalov	Soviet Union	22.0	
			Wind: +0.1 m/s	
