= Athletics at the 1955 World Festival of Youth and Students =

The 5th World Festival of Youth and Students featured an athletics competition among its programme of events. The events were contested in Warsaw, Poland, in August 1955. Mainly contested among Eastern European athletes, it served as an alternative to the more Western European-oriented 1955 Summer International University Sports Week held in San Sebastián the same year.

Following the one-off stand-alone athletics tournament held by the Union Internationale des Étudiants (the 1954 World Student Games), the resumption of the UIE athletics tournament within the World Festival marked a return to top level competitions. The men's winners of the 1954 European Athletics Championships were greatly represented at the competition, with the eleven champions being: Ardalion Ignatyev, Lajos Szentgáli, Emil Zátopek, Yevgeniy Bulanchik, Anatoliy Yulin, Josef Doležal, Ödön Földessy, Leonid Shcherbakov, Mikhail Krivonosov, Janusz Sidło and Vasili Kuznetsov. Triple jumper Leonid Shcherbakov retained his position as the sole man to win that event at the festival; extending his streak from 1949, his fourth straight win at the festival made him the most successful individual male athlete of the competition's history.

In the women's events, the appearance of Australia's Shirley Strickland (a 1952 Olympic champion) added a global element to the normally European contests. She won both the 100 metres and 80 metres hurdles events, as well as taking the 200 metres bronze. Women's European champion Nina Otkalenko won the 800 metres, while reigning Olympic champion Nina Ponomaryova won her fourth straight discus throw title at this competition (only one of two women ever to achieve that feat at the competition, after Iolanda Balaș). Fellow Soviet Olympic champion Galina Zybina took her third world student title in the shot put. Aleksandra Chudina took her ninth career title at the tournament across all events, winning in the javelin throw. Iolanda Balaș won the high jump, following her win at the 1954 World Student Games, and fellow 1954 winner Ursula Donath won the 400 metres in Warsaw.

== Medal summary ==
=== Men ===
Event	Gold		Silver		Bronze	
100 metres	Leonid Bartenyev (URS)	10.4	Boris Tokarev (URS)	10.4	Béla Goldoványi (HUN)	10.5
200 metres	Václav Janeček (TCH)	21.2	Edward Szmidt (POL)	21.3	Leonid Bartenyev (URS)	21.3
400 metres	Ardalion Ignatyev (URS)	47.2	Zbigniew Makomaski (POL)	47.9	Zoltán Adamik (HUN)	48.0
800 metres	Lajos Szentgáli (HUN)	1:51.9	Roman Kreft (POL)	1:52.4	Ludvík Liška (TCH)	1:52.6
1500 metres	László Tábori (HUN)	3:41.6	István Rózsavölgyi (HUN)	3:42.0	Siegfried Herrmann (GDR)	3:42.6
5000 metres	Jerzy Chromik (POL)	13:55.2	Sándor Iharos (HUN)	13:56.6	József Kovács (HUN)	13:57.6
10,000 metres	Emil Zátopek (TCH)	29:34.4	Grigoriy Basalyev (URS)	29:50.6	Stanisław Ożóg (POL)	29:51.8
Marathon	Ivan Filin (URS)	2:28:42	Boris Grishayev (URS)	2:28:42	Drahomír Pechánek (TCH)	2:34:20
110 m hurdles	Boris Stolyarov (URS)	14.6	Vyacheslav Bogatov (URS)	14.6	Yevgeniy Bulanchik (URS)	14.7
400 m hurdles	Ilie Savel (ROM)	52.1	Anatoliy Yulin (URS)	52.2	Yuriy Lituyev (URS)	52.8
3000 metres steeplechase	Vasiliy Vlasenko (URS)	8:49.4	Vlastimil Brlica (TCH)	8:54.0	Mikhail Saltykov (URS)	9:01.2
20 km walk	Josef Doležal (TCH)	1:32:55	Mikhail Lavrov (URS)	1:35:32	Dumitru Paraschivescu (ROM)	1:40:10
50 km walk	Mikhail Lavrov (URS)	4:16:52	Josef Doležal (TCH)	4:29:09	Yevgeniy Maskinskov (URS)	4:32:54
4 × 100 m relay	Hungary (HUN); László Zarándi; Géza Varasdi; György Csányi; Béla Goldoványi	40.7	Soviet Union (URS); Boris Tokarev; Leonid Bartenyev; Levan Sanadze; Yuriy Konovalov	40.8	Poland (POL); Zenon Baranowski; Edward Szmidt; Janusz Jarzembowski; Emil Kiszka	40.9
4 × 400 m relay	Soviet Union (URS); Mikhail Nikolskiy; Viesturs Kumuška; Yuriy Lituyev; Ardalion Ignatyev	3:11.6	Poland (POL); Edward Brabański; Gerard Mach; Stanisław Swatowski; Zbigniew Makomaski	3:11.8	East Germany (GDR); Hans Dittner; Horst Mann; Gerhard Berg; Wilhelm Kustak	3:14.2
High jump	Jaroslav Kovář (TCH)	1.99 m	Volodymyr Sitkin (URS)	1.99 m	Ioan Soter (ROM)	1.96 m
Pole vault	Vitaliy Chernobay (URS)	4.35 m	Zenon Ważny (POL)	4.30 m	Vladimir Bulatov (URS)	4.30 m
Long jump	Ödön Földessy (HUN)	7.42 m	Kazimierz Kropidłowski (POL)	7.29 m	Vladimir Popov (URS)	7.23 m
Triple jump	Leonid Shcherbakov (URS)	16.35 m AR	Yevgeniy Chen (URS)	15.80 m	Martin Řehák (TCH)	15.46 m
Shot put	Otto Grigalka (URS)	17.05 m	Jiří Skobla (TCH)	16.94 m	Feliks Pirts (URS)	16.58 m
Discus throw	Boris Matveyev (URS)	54.41 m	Karel Merta (TCH)	53.01 m	József Szécsényi (HUN)	52.56 m
Hammer throw	Mikhail Krivonosov (URS)	64.33 m WR	József Csermák (HUN)	61.48 m	Nikolay Ryedkin (URS)	60.20 m
Javelin throw	Janusz Sidło (POL)	77.93 m	Aleksandr Gorshkov (URS)	75.02 m	Vladimir Kuznetsov (URS)	72.08 m
Decathlon	Vasili Kuznetsov (URS)	7262 pts	Walter Meier (GDR)	6834 pts	Boris Stolyarov (URS)	6700 pts

=== Women ===
Event	Gold		Silver		Bronze	
100 metres	Shirley Strickland de la Hunty (AUS)	11.3 WR	Vera Neszmélyi (HUN)	11.5	Zinaida Safronova (URS)	11.6
200 metres	Zinaida Safronova (URS)	24.2	Mariya Itkina (URS)	24.5	Shirley Strickland de la Hunty (AUS)	24.5
400 metres	Ursula Donath (GDR)	54.4 WB	Nina Otkalenko (URS)	55.5	Alexandra Sicoe (ROM)	56.0
800 metres	Nina Otkalenko (URS)	2:09.4	Lyudmila Lisenko (URS)	2:10.0	Ursula Donath (GDR)	2:10.2
80 m hurdles	Shirley Strickland de la Hunty (AUS)	11.1	Galina Grinvald (URS)	11.2	Gisela Köhler (GDR)	11.2
4 × 100 m relay	East Germany (GDR); Gisela Köhler; Bärbel Mayer; Annemarie Claussner ?	47.0	Hungary (HUN); Veronika Neszmélyi; Ibolya Tilkovszky; Dora Copindeanu; Irén Orbán	47.3	Poland (POL); Celina Jesionowska; Barbara Janiszewska; Genowefa Minicka; Halina Górecka	47.4
High jump	Iolanda Balaș (ROM)	1.66 m	Olga Modrachová (TCH)	1.64 m	Mariya Pisareva (URS)	1.64 m
Long jump	Galina Vinogradova (URS)	6.27 m AR	Maria Kusion (POL)	5.92 m	Valentina Lituyeva (URS)	5.90 m
Shot put	Galina Zybina (URS)	15.43 m	Zinaida Doinikova (URS)	14.91 m	Johanna Lüttge (GDR)	14.12 m
Discus throw	Nina Ponomaryova (URS)	49.28 m	Irina Beglyakova (URS)	47.12 m	Štepánka Mertová (TCH)	46.74 m
Javelin throw	Aleksandra Chudina (URS)	51.60 m	Maria Ciach (POL)	48.99 m	Jadwiga Majka (POL)	47.89? m
Pentathlon	Galina Grinvald (URS)	4575 pts	Galina Dolzhenkova (URS)	4486 pts	Nina Martinenko (URS)	4470 pts

== Medal table ==
Rank	Nation	Gold	Silver	Bronze	Total
1	Soviet Union (URS)	20	17	15	52
2	Czechoslovakia (TCH)	4	5	4	13
2	Hungary (HUN)	4	5	4	13
4	Poland (POL)	2	8	4	14
5	East Germany (GDR)	2	1	5	8
6	Romania (ROM)	2	0	3	5
7	Australia (AUS)	2	0	1	3
Totals (7 entries)		36	36	36	108

== See also ==
- FISU World University Games § Precursors
- University and college sport
