= 1958 European Athletics Championships – Men's 4 × 100 metres relay =

Men's 4 × 100 metres relay at the European Athletics Championships

The men's 4 × 100 metres relay at the 1958 European Athletics Championships was held in Stockholm, Sweden, at Stockholms Olympiastadion on 23 and 24 August 1958.

== Medalists ==
Gold	Walter Mahlendorf; Armin Hary; Heinz Fütterer; Manfred Germar; West Germany
Silver	Peter Radford; Roy Sandstrom; David Segal; Adrian Breacker; Great Britain
Bronze	Boris Tokarev; Edvin Ozolin; Yuriy Konovalov; Leonid Bartenyev; Soviet Union

== Results ==
=== Final ===
24 August

Rank	Nation	Competitors	Time	Notes
1st place, gold medalist(s)	West Germany	Walter Mahlendorf; Armin Hary; Heinz Fütterer; Manfred Germar	40.2	CR
2nd place, silver medalist(s)	Great Britain	Peter Radford; Roy Sandstrom; David Segal; Adrian Breacker	40.2	CR NR
3rd place, bronze medalist(s)	Soviet Union	Boris Tokarev; Edvin Ozolin; Yuriy Konovalov; Leonid Bartenyev	40.4	
4	Czechoslovakia	Václav Janeček; František Mikluščak; Vilém Mandlík; Václav Kynos	40.7	
5	France	Bernard Cahen; Joël Caprice; Constantin Lissenko; Jocelyn Delecour	41.0	
	Italy	Pier Giorgio Cazzola; Sergio D'Asnasch; Livio Berruti; Giorgio Mazza	DQ	

=== Heats ===
23 August

==== Heat 1 ====
Rank	Nation	Competitors	Time	Notes
1	Great Britain	Peter Radford; Roy Sandstrom; David Segal; Adrian Breacker	40.9	Q
2	Soviet Union	Boris Tokarev; Edvin Ozolin; Yuriy Konovalov; Leonid Bartenyev	41.1	Q
3	France	Bernard Cahen; Joël Caprice; Constantin Lissenko; Jocelyn Delecour	41.3	Q
4	Poland	Zenon Baranowski; Marian Foik; Andrzej Zieliński; Edward Szmidt	41.3	
5	Switzerland	Emil Weber; Erwin Müller; Hans Wehrli; René Weber	42.0	

==== Heat 2 ====
Rank	Nation	Competitors	Time	Notes
1	Italy	Pier Giorgio Cazzola; Sergio D'Asnasch; Livio Berruti; Giorgio Mazza	40.9	Q
2	West Germany	Walter Mahlendorf; Armin Hary; Heinz Fütterer; Manfred Germar	41.0	Q
3	Czechoslovakia	Václav Janeček; František Mikluščak; Vilém Mandlík; Václav Kynos	41.1	Q
	Sweden	Per-Ove Trollsås; Björn Malmroos; Sven-Olof Westlund; Sven-Åke Löfgren	DNF	
	Hungary	György Gyuricza; Béla Tóth; Sándor Jakabfy; Béla Goldoványi	DQ	

== Participation ==
According to an unofficial count, 40 athletes from 10 countries participated in the event.

- Czechoslovakia (4)
- France (4)
- Hungary (4)
- Italy (4)
- Poland (4)
- Soviet Union (4)
- Sweden (4)
- Switzerland (4)
- Great Britain (4)
- West Germany (4)
