= Edward Martins =

Liberian sprinter

Personal information
- Nationality: Liberian
- Born: Edward Dio Martins; 17 April 1933 (age 93)

Sport
- Sport: Sprinting
- Event: 4 × 100 metres relay

Edward Dio Martins (born 17 April 1933) is a Liberian sprinter and long jumper. Martins would compete at the 1956 Summer Olympics in Melbourne, Australia, representing Liberia in athletics. He would be one of the first athletes to represent the nation at the Summer Games as the nation made its debut here.

He would first compete in the qualifying round of the men's long jump. There, he would place 31st in the round and would not qualify for the finals. He would then compete in the men's 4 × 100 metres relay alongside his teammates. They would place in their heat and would not advance to the finals as well.

== Biography ==
Edward Dio Martins was born on 17 April 1933. Martins would compete at the 1956 Summer Olympics in Melbourne, Australia, representing Liberia in two athletics events. He would be one of the first Liberian athletes to compete at an Olympic Games.

Martins would first compete in the qualifying round of the men's long jump on 24 November against 31 other competitors in the event. There, he would jump successive marks of 5.79 metres, 6.01 metres, and 5.96 metres. His highest mark of 6.01 metres would be credited to him and would make him place 31st overall. He would not advance to the finals held in the same day.

Martins would also be part of the Liberian men's 4 × 100 metres relay team alongside compatriots George Johnson, James Roberts, and Emmanuel Putu. There, they would compete in the first round on 30 November against four other teams. The team would finish with a time of 44.96 seconds. They would place last in their round and would not advance to the finals of the event.

He was also entered to compete in the men's 4 × 400 metres relay but did not start in the event.
