= George Johnson (athlete) =

Liberian athlete

George N. Johnson (born 12 June 1938 in Monrovia) is a Liberian track and field athlete. He competed for Liberia in the country's first Olympic appearance in 1956(Melbourne, Australia) and again at the 1960 Summer Olympics (Roma, Italy). He competed individually in the 400 metres and 800 metres. In 1956 Johnson competed with Edward Martins, Emmanuel Putu, and James Roberts in the 4×100 metres relay. His personal best for 400 metres is 51.54 (1960) and his personal best for 800 metres is 1:56.04 (1960).

Olympic Games	Event	Position	Time (Round 1)	Time (Quarterfinal)	Time (Semifinal)	Time (Final)
1956 Summer	400 Metres, Men	6 h7	54.8 seconds	-	-	-
	800 Metres, Men	7 h4	-	-	-	-
	1,500 Metres, Men	DNS	-	-	-	-
	4×100 Metres Relay, Men	5 h1	44.7 seconds	-	-	-
	4×400 Metres Relay, Men	DNS	-	-	-	-
1960 Summer	400 Metres, Men	6 h5	51.4 seconds	-	-	-
	800 Metres, Men	6 h1	1 min 55.9 sec	-	-	-
	4×100 Metres, Men	DNS	-	-	-	-

DNS: Did Not Start
