= Andy Stanfield =

American athletics competitor (1927–85)

Medal record

Men's athletics

Representing the United States

Olympic Games
Gold medal – first place	1952 Helsinki	200 metres
Gold medal – first place	1952 Helsinki	4 × 100 m relay
Silver medal – second place	1956 Melbourne	200 metres

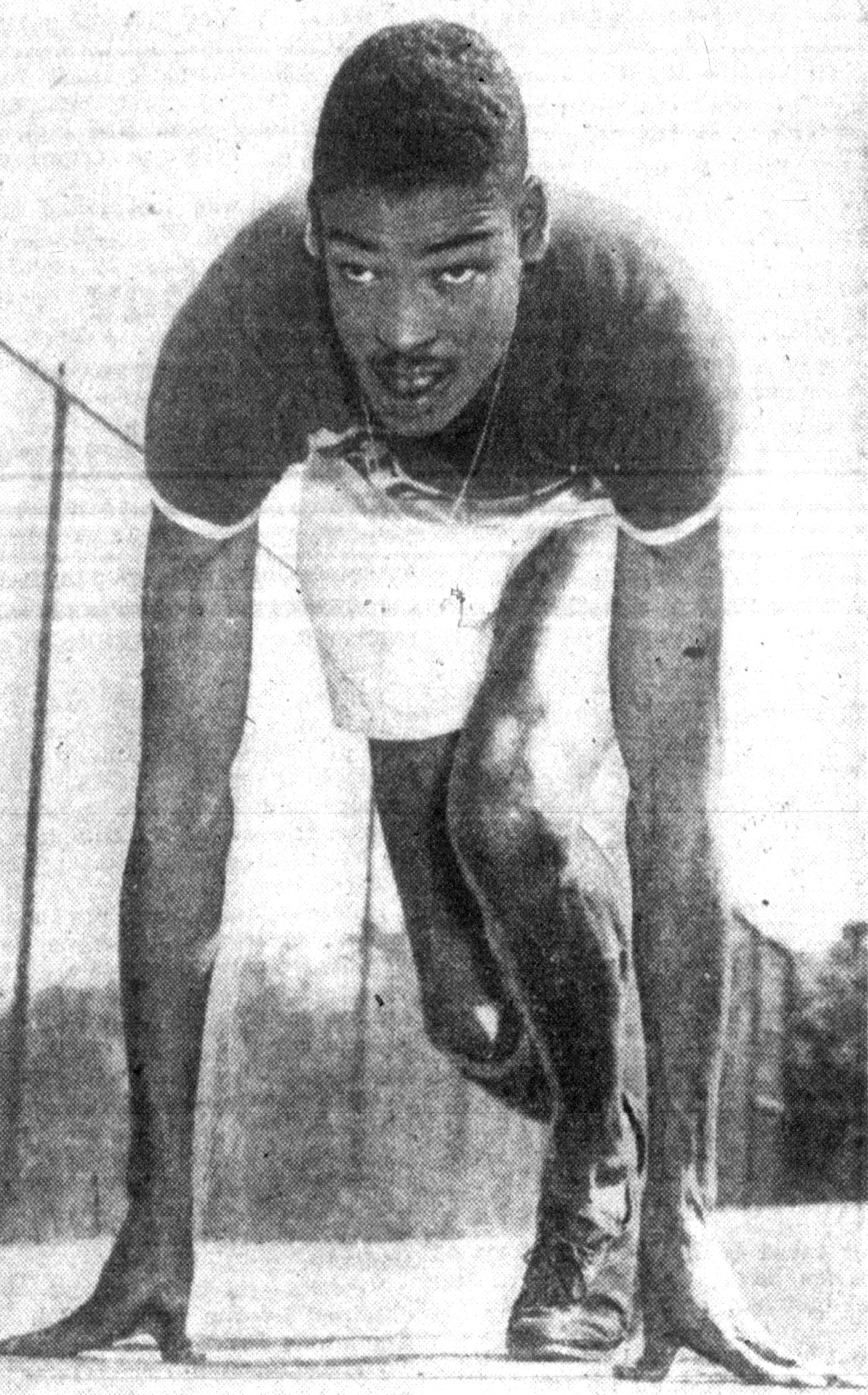
Stanfield, circa 1950

Andrew William Stanfield (December 29, 1927 – June 15, 1985) was an American sprinter and Olympic gold and silver medallist.

== Biography ==
Andy Stanfield born in Washington, D.C., but moved to Jersey City as a child. He graduated from Lincoln High School in 1946, where he was already a talented athlete, excelling in the sprints and long jump. After his army service, Stanfield entered Seton Hall University in 1948. The following year, he won his first of a long list of national titles. His list includes six AAU titles (1949: 100 and 200 m; 1950: 60 y; 1951: long jump; 1952: 200 m; 1953: 220 y) and nine IC4A titles (both indoor and outdoor). He was coached by Johnny Gibson, a former world record holder in 400 m hurdles.

Internationally, the 200 m was Stanfield's strongest distance. In 1951, at the ICAAAA Championships, Stanfield—in the outside lane—won the Turn 220-Yard Dash in 20.6. The Turn-220 had never been commonly contested in the US. 220s were normally raced on "NoTurn" or "Straight" courses. In 1951 the IAAF commenced to establish world records for the Turn-200-Meters: the initial listing accepted was by Willie Applegarth of Great Britain in 21 1/5, set in London in 1914. That spring of 1951, Stanfield's Intercollegiate 220-Yard Dash in 20.6 was established by the IAAF as a new World-Record for the 200 m with 20.6 (220 yards is more than one meter longer than 200 meters).

Then, there was no "official" world record for the Turn-220. But in the United States, Ralph Metcalfe was generally agreed to have the American record at 21-flat set in Berlin 1933 (no wind). Then Jack Wierhauser of Stanford University clocked 20.9 (no wind) in 1936 at a US Olympics Trials at Randalls Island. Jesse Owens clocked 20.7 at the Berlin '36 Games with wind. Barney Ewell, at the US Nationals in 1939 at Lincoln, Nebraska, on the partial bend course on that track, clocked what was likely an AAU record of 21.1, but that course was never well-delineated. At the 1948 US Olympic Trials, Mel Patton beat Barney Ewell, both clocked in 20.7 (no wind). None of these were ratified for the simple reason that the IAAF did not distinguish between records made on a turn from those on a straight.

Stanfield would equal this performance twice, running 20.6 in 1952 and 1956. The '56 performance occurred at the AAU Championships, where Stanfield finished 2nd behind Thane Baker, the champion. As the world record holder, Stanfield in 1952 was not a surprise winner of the gold medal at the 1952 Summer Olympics, equalling the Olympic Record in the final. As a member of the American 4 × 100 m relay team, Stanfield won a second Olympic gold medal. He attempted to defend his 200 m title in the 1956 Games, but lost it, finishing second to Bobby Morrow.

Stanfield was a member of Alpha Phi Alpha fraternity.
