= Jan Jarzembowski =

Polish sprinter

Personal information
- Nationality: Polish
- Born: 29 November 1933 Poznań, Poland
- Died: 14 June 1961 (aged 27) Poznań, Poland
- Height: 1.75 m (5 ft 9 in)
- Weight: 69 kg (152 lb)

Sport
- Sport: Sprinting
- Event: 100 metres
- Club: Warta Poznań

Janusz (Jan) Jarzembowski (29 November 1933 – 14 June 1961) was a Polish sprinter. He competed in the men's 100 metres at the 1956 Summer Olympics, exiting the competition at the quarter-final stage. At the same games, he competed in the Men's 200 metres, failing to qualify from his heat, and as a member of the Polish team in the Men's 4 × 100 metres relay, where Poland finished 6th in the final.

In 1960, Jarzembowski was the Polish national champion in the men's 200 metres, with a time of 21.7 seconds. In the same year, he was part of Poland's 4 x 100 metres relay team at the 1960 Summer Olympics; they were disqualified in the heats.

Jarzembowski was born in Poznań, the son of Bronisław and Joanna Jarzembowski, and trained at a Mechanical Technical School. He joined an athletics club in Poznań and in 1954 became a member of Legia Warsaw. He was a member of the 4 x 100 metres relay team that were national champions in 1954 and 1955. He twice won medals at international youth athletics championships as part of Poland's 4 x 100 metres relay team: bronze in Warsaw in 1955 and silver in Moscow in 1957.

His personal best times were 10.5 seconds in the 100 metres (1958) and 21.5 in the 200 metres (1959).

Jarzembowski died in Poznań, aged 27.

== International competitions ==
Year	Competition	Venue	Position	Event	Notes
Representing Poland
1955	World Festival of Youth and Students	Warsaw, Poland	3rd	4 × 100 m relay	40.9
1956	Olympic Games	Melbourne, Australia	17th (qf)	100 m	10.98
1956	Olympic Games	Melbourne, Australia	18th (h)	200 m	21.91
1956	Olympic Games	Melbourne, Australia	6th	4 × 100 m relay	40.75
1957	World Festival of Youth and Students	Moscow, Soviet Union	2nd	4 × 100 m relay	40.8
1960	Olympic Games	Rome, Italy	9th (sf)	100 m	10.66
1960	Olympic Games	Rome, Italy	4th	200 m	20.90
1960	Olympic Games	Rome, Italy	– (h)	4 × 100 m relay	DQ

== Personal bests ==
- 100 metres – 10.5h (Łódź 1958)
- 200 metres – 21.5h (Poznań 1959)
