= Edmund Turton =

Edmund Turton may refer to:

- Sir Edmund Turton, 1st Baronet (1857–1929), British politician
- Edmund Turton (athlete) (born 1932), Olympic runner from Trinidad and Tobago
