= Breacker =

Breacker is a surname. Notable people with the surname include:

- Adrian Breacker (1934–2023), English athlete
- Tim Breacker (born 1965), English footballer and manager
