= Oliver Hunter =

Guyanese sprinter (born 1934)

Personal information
- Nationality: Guyanese
- Born: 1934 (age 91–92)

Sport
- Sport: Sprinting
- Event: 100 metres

Oliver Stanford Hunter (born 1934) is a Guyanese sprinter. He competed in the men's 100 metres and men's 200 metres at the 1956 Summer Olympics.
