= 5th World Festival of Youth and Students =

1955 youth festival in Warsaw, Polish People's Republic

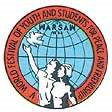
- Host country: Polish People's Republic
- Dates: 31 July - 15 August 1955
- Motto: For Peace and Friendship – Against the Aggressive Imperialist Pacts
- Cities: Warsaw
- Participants: 30,000+ people from 114 countries
- Follows: 6th World Festival of Youth and Students
- Precedes: 4th World Festival of Youth and Students

The 5th World Festival of Youth and Students (WFYS) was held from 31 July to 15 August 1955 in Warsaw, capital city of the then Polish People's Republic.

== Organisation and events ==
The World Federation of Democratic Youth organized this festival during the rise of the peaceful coexistence concept introduced by Nikita Khrushchev among the socialist bloc. At the end of the 1950s, the colonialism was in its last years, and in the same year, the Bandung Conference was held. The conference strongly criticized the western powers for keeping their colonial possessions. The need for a struggle against the danger of nuclear annihilation and for the end of colonialism dominated the festival.

More than 30,000 young people from 114 countries participated in this edition of the festival.

The motto of the festival was For Peace and Friendship – Against the Aggressive Imperialist Pacts.

The festival's sports programme featured an athletics competition. The Arsenał art exhibition opened at the festival, featuring striking works by young Polish painters. This exhibition was the subject of debate among art critics over its use of expressionist styles.

== Influence ==
Designed to be a vast propaganda exercise, a meeting place for Eastern European communists and their comrades from Western Europe, Asia, Africa, and South America. This event brought hundred of thousands of Polish spectators to Warsaw for the five days, watching dancing, theater and other attractions. However, the real attractions for the Polish people were the foreigners, of whom many were from Western Europe and contrasted starkly with local Poles because they shared similar culture but were much richer and more open. Deeply stricken, many Poles realized that a decades' worth of anti-Western rhetoric was false. Poles, Germans, Hungarians, Czechs and others from the Communist bloc actively socialized with one another. With the more exotic visitors, Poles also socialized in private apartments all around the city. College students even held debate meetings with foreigners, many of whom turned out not to be communists.

The event may be viewed as a precursor of Polish October.
