= Eero Kivelä =

Finnish sprinter (born 1930)

Personal information
- Nationality: Finnish
- Born: 1 May 1930 Myrskylä, Finland
- Died: 9 September 2026 (aged 96) Lahti, Finland

Sport
- Sport: Sprinting
- Event: 200 metres

Eero Olavi Kivelä (1 May 1930 – 9 September 2026) was a Finnish sprinter. He competed in the men's 200 metres at the 1956 Summer Olympics.
