= Zenon Baranowski =

Polish sprinter

Personal information
- Full name: Zenon Franciszek Baranowski
- Nationality: Polish
- Born: 21 November 1930 Swarzędz, Poland
- Died: 12 October 1980 (aged 49) Poznań, Poland
- Height: 1.71 m (5 ft 7 in)
- Weight: 70 kg (154 lb)

Sport
- Sport: Sprinting
- Events: 100 metres, 200 metres
- Club: Olimpia Poznań

Zenon Franciszek Baranowski (21 November 1930 – 12 October 1980) was a Polish sprinter. He competed in the men's 4 × 100 metres relay at the 1956 Summer Olympics.

== International competitions ==
Year	Competition	Venue	Position	Event	Notes
Representing Poland
1954	World Student Games	Budapest, Hungary	3rd	200 m	21.7
1954	World Student Games	Budapest, Hungary	2nd	4 × 100 m relay	41.4
1955	World Festival of Youth and Students	Warsaw, Poland	3rd	4 × 100 m relay	40.9
1956	Olympic Games	Melbourne, Australia	6th	4 × 100 m relay	40.75
1957	World Festival of Youth and Students	Moscow, Soviet Union	2nd	4 × 100 m relay	40.8
1958	European Championships	Stockholm, Sweden	7th (h)	4 × 100 m relay	41.3

== Personal bests ==
- 100 metres – 10.3h (Szczecin 1958)
- 200 metres – 21.4h (Budapest 1955)
