= Leamon King =

American athlete (1936–2001)

Personal information
- Born: February 13, 1936 Tulare, California, U.S.
- Died: May 22, 2001 (aged 65) Delano, California, U.S.
- Height: 5 ft 11 in (180 cm)
- Weight: 141 lb (64 kg)
Medal record
Men's athletics
Representing the United States
Olympic Games
| Gold medal – first place | 1956 Melbourne | 4 × 100 metres relay |

Leamon King (February 13, 1936 – May 22, 2001) was an American athlete who jointly held the world record for the 100-meter sprint for men from 1956 to 1960.

King, a graduate of the University of California, Berkeley, became joint holder of the record on October 20, 1956 in Ontario, California, with a time of 10.1 seconds, equal with Willie Williams and Ira Murchison, and repeated the time a week later in Santa Ana, California. (In 1956, times were only recorded to the nearest tenth of a second.) Ray Norton also recorded a time of 10.1 seconds in 1959. The first person to run unambiguously faster in competition was Armin Hary in 1960.

He also jointly held the world 100 yard record with a time of 9.3 seconds.

King, along with Murchison, Thane Baker, and Bobby Morrow, won a gold medal at the 1956 Summer Olympics in Melbourne in the 4 × 100 metre relay. He ran the second leg of the race.

After retiring from athletics, King returned to his job as a schoolteacher, living in Delano, California. He had been a successful student athlete, breaking and making records, at Delano High School, making the finals at the CIF California State Meet in both the 100 yard dash and 220 yard dash each of his four years, winning the 100 once and the 220 twice.
