= Kyohei Ushio =

Japanese sprinter

Personal information
- Nationality: Japanese
- Born: 12 December 1934 Shimane, Japan
- Died: 25 March 2010 (aged 75) Tokyo, Japan

Sport
- Sport: Sprinting
- Event: 100 metres

Kyohei Ushio (Japanese: 潮 喬平, Hepburn: Ushio Kyōhei; 12 December 1934 – 25 March 2010), also spelled Kyoshei Ushio, was a Japanese sprinter. He competed in the men's 100 metres, the men's 200 metres, and the men's 4×100 metres relay at the 1956 Summer Olympics.

Ushio ran 10.5 seconds in the 100 metres on two occasions, both in 1956 (in Nerima) and in 1957 (in Kumamoto), both times winning performances.
