= Lothar Knörzer =

German sprinter

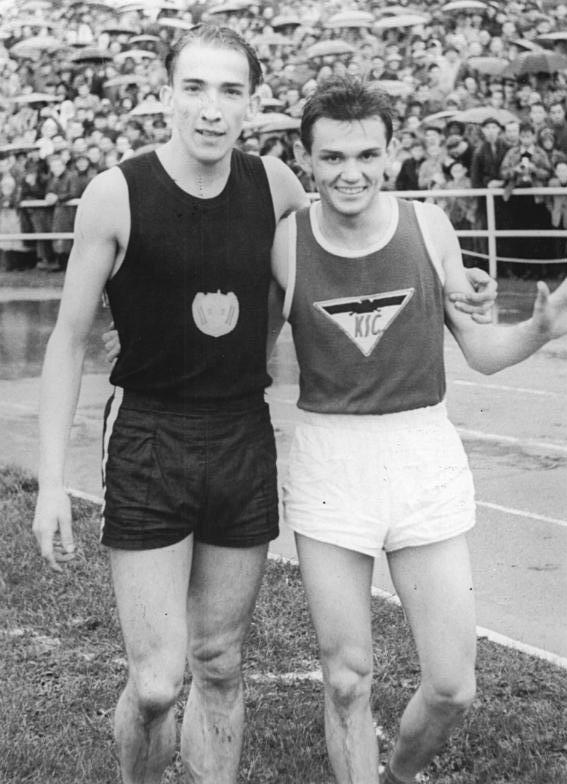
- Lothar Knörzer (right) with Manfred Steinbach, 1957

Medal record

Men's Athletics

Representing Germany
Bronze medal – third place	1956 Melbourne	4 × 100 metre relay

Lothar Knörzer (born 4 August 1933, in Karlsruhe) is a West German athlete who competed mainly in the 100 metres.

He competed for the United Team of Germany in the 1956 Summer Olympics held in Melbourne in the 4 × 100-metre relay where he won the bronze medal with his team mates Leonhard Pohl, Heinz Fütterer and Manfred Germar.
