= Raja bin Ngah Ali =

Malaysian sprinter

Personal information
- Nationality: Malaysian
- Born: 1933 (age 92–93) Kuala Kangsar

Sport
- Sport: Sprinting
- Event: 100 metres

Raja bin Ngah Ali (born 1933) is a Malaysian sprinter. He competed in the men's 100 metres at the 1956 Summer Olympics.
