= Athletics at the 1956 Summer Olympics =

Athletics at the Games of the XVI Olympiad
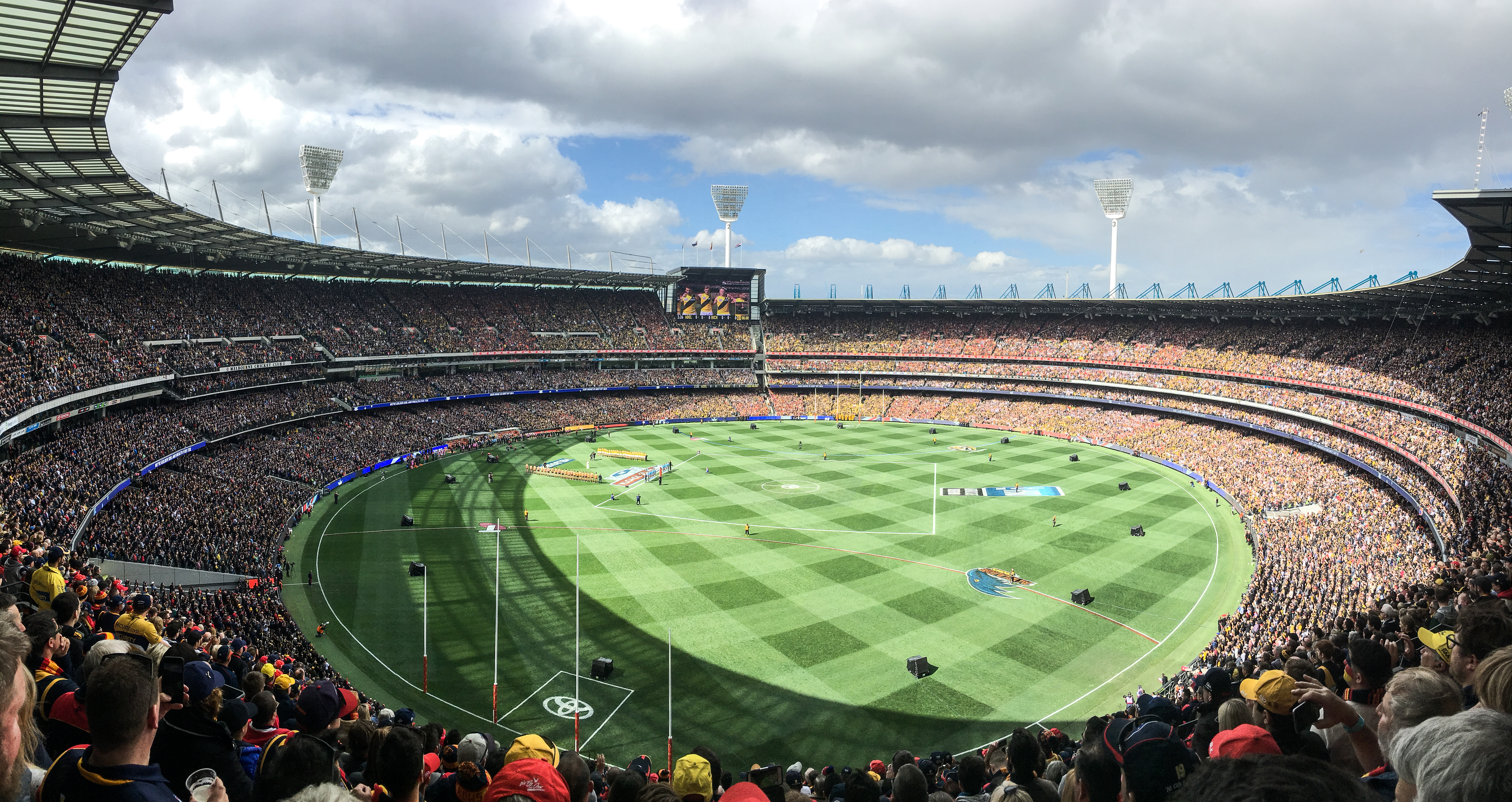
- Host stadium (shown in 2017)
- Dates: 23 November – 1 December
- No. of events: 33
- Competitors: 720 from 61 nations

At the 1956 Summer Olympics in Melbourne, 33 athletics events were contested, 24 for men and 9 for women. There were a total number of 720 participating athletes from 61 countries.

== Medal summary ==
=== Men ===
Event	Gold		Silver		Bronze	
100 metres	Bobby Morrow; United States	10.5	Thane Baker; United States	10.5	Hector Hogan; Australia	10.6
200 metres	Bobby Morrow; United States	20.6 (OR)	Andy Stanfield; United States	20.7	Thane Baker; United States	20.9
400 metres	Charles Jenkins; United States	46.7	Karl-Friedrich Haas; United Team of Germany	46.8	Voitto Hellsten; Finland	47.0
400 metres	Charles Jenkins; United States	46.7	Karl-Friedrich Haas; United Team of Germany	46.8	Ardalion Ignatyev; Soviet Union	47.0
800 metres	Tom Courtney; United States	1:47.7 (OR)	Derek Johnson; Great Britain	1:47.8	Audun Boysen; Norway	1:48.1
1500 metres	Ron Delany; Ireland	3:41.2 (OR)	Klaus Richtzenhain; United Team of Germany	3:42.0	John Landy; Australia	3:42.0
5000 metres	Vladimir Kuts; Soviet Union	13:39.6 (OR)	Gordon Pirie; Great Britain	13:50.6	Derek Ibbotson; Great Britain	13:54.4
10,000 metres	Vladimir Kuts; Soviet Union	28:45.6 (OR)	József Kovács; Hungary	28:52.4	Al Lawrence; Australia	28:53.6
110 metres hurdles	Lee Calhoun; United States	13.5 (OR)	Jack Davis; United States	13.5 (OR)	Joel Shankle; United States	14.1
400 metres hurdles	Glenn Davis; United States	50.1 (=OR)	Eddie Southern; United States	50.8	Josh Culbreath; United States	51.6
3000 metres steeplechase	Chris Brasher; Great Britain	8:41.2 (OR)	Sándor Rozsnyói; Hungary	8:43.6	Ernst Larsen; Norway	8:44.0
4 × 100 metres relay	United States; Ira Murchison; Leamon King; Thane Baker; Bobby Morrow	39.5 (WR)	Soviet Union; Leonid Bartenyev; Boris Tokarev; Yuriy Konovalov; Vladimir Sukharev	39.8	United Team of Germany; Lothar Knörzer; Leonhard Pohl; Heinz Fütterer; Manfred Germar	40.3
4 × 400 metres relay	United States; Lou Jones; Jesse Mashburn; Charles Jenkins; Tom Courtney	3:04.8	Australia; Leon Gregory; David Lean; Graham Gipson; Kevan Gosper	3:06.2	Great Britain; John Salisbury; Michael Wheeler; Peter Higgins; Derek Johnson	3:07.2
Marathon	Alain Mimoun; France	2:25:00	Franjo Mihalić; Yugoslavia	2:26:32	Veikko Karvonen; Finland	2:27:47
20 kilometres walk	Leonid Spirin; Soviet Union	1:31:27.4 (OR)	Antanas Mikėnas; Soviet Union	1:32:03.0	Bruno Junk; Soviet Union	1:32:12.0
50 kilometres walk	Norman Read; New Zealand	4:30:42.8	Yevgeny Maskinskov; Soviet Union	4:32:57.0	John Ljunggren; Sweden	4:35:02.0
High jump	Charles Dumas; United States	2.12 m (OR)	Chilla Porter; Australia	2.10 m	Igor Kashkarov; Soviet Union	2.08 m
Pole vault	Bob Richards; United States	4.56 m (OR)	Bob Gutowski; United States	4.53 m	Georgios Roubanis; Greece	4.50 m
Long jump	Greg Bell; United States	7.83 m (OR)	John Bennett; United States	7.68 m	Jorma Valkama; Finland	7.48 m
Triple jump	Adhemar da Silva; Brazil	16.35 m (OR)	Vilhjálmur Einarsson; Iceland	16.26 m	Vitold Kreyer; Soviet Union	16.02 m
Shot put	Parry O'Brien; United States	18.57 m (OR)	Bill Nieder; United States	18.18 m	Jiří Skobla; Czechoslovakia	17.65 m
Discus throw	Al Oerter; United States	56.36 m (OR)	Fortune Gordien; United States	54.81 m	Des Koch; United States	54.40 m
Hammer throw	Hal Connolly; United States	63.19 m (OR)	Mikhail Krivonosov; Soviet Union	63.03 m	Anatoliy Samotsvetov; Soviet Union	62.56 m
Javelin throw	Egil Danielsen; Norway	85.71 m (WR)	Janusz Sidło; Poland	79.98 m	Viktor Tsybulenko; Soviet Union	79.50 m
Decathlon	Milt Campbell; United States	7937 (OR)	Rafer Johnson; United States	7587	Vasili Kuznetsov; Soviet Union	7465

=== Women ===
Event	Gold		Silver		Bronze	
100 metres	Betty Cuthbert; Australia	11.5	Christa Stubnick; United Team of Germany	11.7	Marlene Mathews; Australia	11.7
200 metres	Betty Cuthbert; Australia	23.4 (=OR)	Christa Stubnick; United Team of Germany	23.7	Marlene Mathews; Australia	23.8
80 metres hurdles	Shirley Strickland de la Hunty; Australia	10.7 (OR)	Gisela Köhler; United Team of Germany	10.9	Norma Thrower; Australia	11.0
4 × 100 metres relay	Australia; Shirley Strickland de la Hunty; Norma Croker; Fleur Mellor; Betty Cuthbert	44.5 (WR)	Great Britain; Anne Pashley; Jean Scrivens; June Paul; Heather Armitage	44.7	United States; Mae Faggs; Margaret Matthews; Wilma Rudolph; Isabelle Daniels	44.9
High jump	Mildred McDaniel; United States	1.76 m (WR)	Thelma Hopkins; Great Britain; Mariya Pisareva; Soviet Union	1.67 m	none awarded	
Long jump	Elżbieta Krzesińska; Poland	6.35 m (=WR)	Willye White; United States	6.09 m	Nadezhda Dvalishvili; Soviet Union	6.07 m
Shot put	Tamara Tyshkevich; Soviet Union	16.59 m (OR)	Galina Zybina; Soviet Union	16.53 m	Marianne Werner; United Team of Germany	15.61 m
Discus throw	Olga Fikotová; Czechoslovakia	53.69 m (OR)	Irina Beglyakova; Soviet Union	52.54 m	Nina Ponomaryova; Soviet Union	52.02 m
Javelin throw	Inese Jaunzeme; Soviet Union	53.86 m (OR)	Marlene Ahrens; Chile	50.38 m	Nadezhda Konyayeva; Soviet Union	50.28 m

== Medal table ==
Rank	Nation	Gold	Silver	Bronze	Total
1	United States	16	10	5	31
2	Soviet Union	5	7	10	22
3	Australia	4	2	6	12
4	Great Britain	1	4	2	7
5	Poland	1	1	0	2
6	Norway	1	0	2	3
7	Czechoslovakia	1	0	1	2
8	Brazil	1	0	0	1
8	France	1	0	0	1
8	Ireland	1	0	0	1
8	New Zealand	1	0	0	1
12	United Team of Germany	0	5	2	7
13	Hungary	0	2	0	2
14	Chile	0	1	0	1
14	Iceland	0	1	0	1
14	Yugoslavia	0	1	0	1
17	Finland	0	0	3	3
18	Greece	0	0	1	1
18	Sweden	0	0	1	1
Totals (19 entries)		33	34	33	100

== Participating nations ==
- Argentina (2)
- Australia (79)
- Austria (3)
- Bahamas (1)
- Belgium (6)
- Brazil (6)
- Bulgaria (1)
- Burma (1)
- Canada (18)
- Ceylon (1)
- Chile (6)
- Republic of China (4)
- Colombia (4)
- Cuba (2)
- Czechoslovakia (16)
- Denmark (2)
- Ethiopia (13)
- Fiji (1)
- Finland (19)
- France (29)
- United Team of Germany (45)
- Great Britain (56)
- Greece (6)
- Guyana (2)
- Hungary (19)
- Iceland (2)
- India (8)
- Indonesia (3)
- Iran (2)
- Iraq (1)
- Ireland (3)
- Israel (1)
- Italy (21)
- Jamaica (5)
- Japan (20)
- Kenya (9)
- South Korea (8)
- Liberia (5)
- Luxembourg (3)
- Malaya (7)
- Mexico (1)
- New Zealand (9)
- Nigeria (10)
- North Borneo (2)
- Norway (5)
- Pakistan (18)
- Philippines (4)
- Poland (25)
- Puerto Rico (8)
- Romania (5)
- Singapore (5)
- South Africa (9)
- Soviet Union (77)
- Sweden (18)
- Thailand (9)
- Trinidad and Tobago (3)
- Uganda (3)
- United States (83)
- Uruguay (1)
- Venezuela (5)
- Yugoslavia (7)
