= Akira Kiyofuji =

Japanese sprinter

Personal information
- Nationality: Japanese
- Born: 24 April 1932 (age 94)

Sport
- Sport: Sprinting
- Event: 100 metres

Akira Kiyofuji (清藤 亨, Kiyofuji Akira; born 24 April 1932) is a Japanese sprinter. He competed in the men's 100 metres, the men's 200 metres, and the men's 4×100 metres relay at the 1956 Summer Olympics.
