= Maurice Rae =

New Zealand athlete

Morrie Rae
Personal information
- Nationality: New Zealander
- Born: 12 March 1935 (age 91) Auckland, New Zealand
- Occupation: Patternmaker
- Height: 178 cm (5 ft 10 in)
- Weight: 68 kg (150 lb)

Sport
- Sport: Track and field
- Events: 100 m, 200 m
- Coached by: Joe McManemin

Maurice Leslie Rae (born 12 March 1935) is a former New Zealand athlete who competed at the 1956 Summer Olympics.

== Biography ==
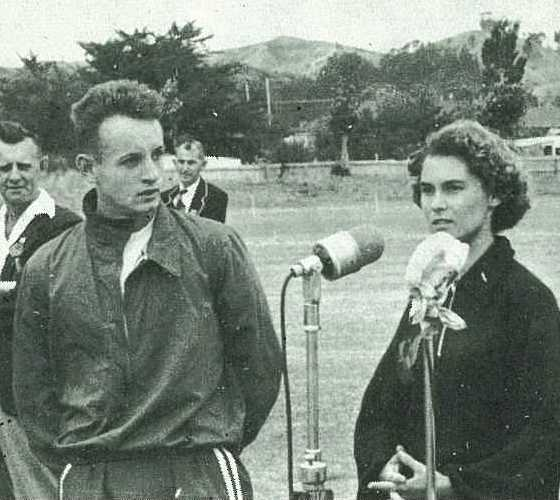
NZ sprinters Rae and Beverly Weigel in 1957

Rae was a sprinter, he represented New Zealand at the 1956 Melbourne Olympics and 1958 British Empire and Commonwealth Games in Cardiff, reaching the semifinals of the 100 m and 200 m at Melbourne and the 100 yards and 220 yards at Cardiff.

On 20 February 1955, Rae defeated Australian Hector Hogan, at that time the world record holder for the 100 yards, in races over 100 yards and 220 yards. Rae's time of 9.7 seconds for the 100 yards broke the New Zealand resident record for the distance, which had stood for 63 years. At the Australian track and field championships in Melbourne in 1956, Rae was second behind Hogan in both the 100 yards and 220 yards finals.

Rae finished second behind Jimmy Omagbemi in the 100 yards event at the British 1958 AAA Championships.
