= Negussie Roba =

Ethiopian sprinter

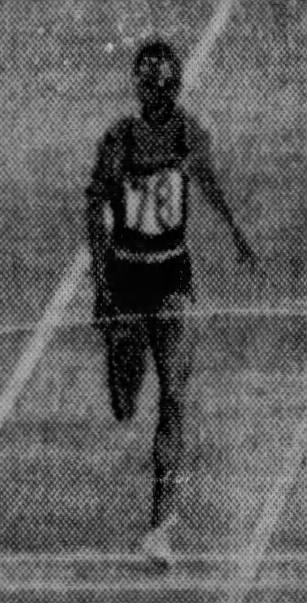
- Negussie at the 1960 Summer Olympics

Personal information
- Nationality: Ethiopian
- Born: 10 September 1936 FereAd, Jijiga, Hararghe, Ethiopian Empire
- Died: 14 April 1992 (aged 55)
- Education: Charles University
- Height: 168 cm (5 ft 6 in)
- Weight: 61 kg (134 lb)

Sport
- Sport: Sprinting
- Events: 100 metres 200 metres 4 × 100 metres relay 4 × 400 metres relay

Negussie Roba (Amharic: ንጉሴ ሮባ; 10 September 1936 – 14 April 1992), (Note: Although Olympedia reports his date of death to be in 1993, other sources list the date as occurring in 1992.) also known as Roba Negousse and Robba Neggousse, was an Ethiopian sprinter and coach. A two-time Olympian, he was one of the first representatives from his country at the games and later became regarded as one of the country's best athletics coaches.

== Early life ==
Negussie was born on 10 September 1936 in FereAd, Jijiga, Hararghe, and grew up in Addis Ababa, the capital of Ethiopia. After having received primary and secondary education at the Teferri Mekonnen School, he attended the Addis Ababa commercial school and later received a master's degree in sports and physical training from Charles University of Czechoslovakia.

== Sporting career ==
Negussie was both a sprinter and football player; he was selected to participate at the 1956 Summer Olympics in Melbourne, Australia, being among the 12 competitors on Ethiopia's first Olympic team. He was chosen to partake in four events: the 100 metres, the 200 metres, the 4 × 100 metres relay and the 4 × 400 metres relay, although he did not compete in the last one. In the 100 metres and 200 metres, Negussie finished last in his heat each time, while the Ethiopian team in the 4 × 100 metres relay was also eliminated in the heat. Four years later, Negussie competed in the 100 metres in the 1960 Summer Olympics, held in Rome, Italy, again placing last in his heat.

== Coaching career ==
After his appearance at the 1960 Olympics, Negussie entered coaching and became regarded as one of the best athletics coaches in Ethiopian history. He became the head coach of the Ethiopian Athletics Federation (EAF) in 1968 and remained in that role until his death in April 1992.

Negussie achieved "glory and fame" as Ethiopian athletics coach, according to the website Sport Memory, and was described by The Sydney Morning Herald as having had "as much influence as anybody in launching his nation as the greatest seat of long distance running the world has known." MEDIAEthiopia noted that he was a "sensational national coach" and said that he is "widely acknowledged as the man behind the success of every Ethiopian long-distance runner from the Mexico City Olympics [in 1968] all the way to the Moscow Olympics in 1980." Negussie was reported in the Salem News as having been "renowned for producing great athletes" and trained athletes to six Olympic medals; among them was Abebe Bikila, the first person to win two Olympic marathons, and Mamo Wolde, who won the marathon directly after Bikila.

Negussie coached athletes in other African countries as well, and was the coach of teams representing the continent at several international events, helping them win medals in competitions in Australia, Germany and the Americas. He coached the African team at the IAAF Continental Cup on at least one occasion. He was on the executive committee of the African Amateur Athletics Federation and was a part of the International Amateur Athletic Federation (IAAF). Negussie was given the Black Nile medal by the Ethiopian government and received a diploma and "veteran pin" from the IAAF. He was also awarded an automobile for being the trainer of Belayneh Dinsamo, who held a long-standing marathon world record.

== Death and legacy ==
Negussie died in April 1992; he was succeeded as Ethiopian athletics coach by his friend and student Woldemeskel Kostre, who went on to be another of Ethiopia's greatest athletics coaches. MEDIAEthiopia said that "Ethiopia will always remember this fine coach for the pride he brought to his people."
