= Edward Szmidt =

Polish sprinter (1931–2018)

Personal information
- Full name: Edward Jan Szmidt
- Other names: Eberhard Schmidt
- Nationality: Polish
- Born: 4 August 1931 Zabrze
- Died: 29 April 2018 (aged 86) Hamm, North Rhine-Westphalia, Germany
- Height: 1.82 m (6 ft 0 in)
- Weight: 73 kg (161 lb)

Sport
- Sport: Sprinting
- Event: 200 metres
- Club: Górnik Zabrze

Edward Jan Szmidt (4 August 1931 – 29 April 2018) was a Polish sprinter. He competed in the men's 200 metres at the 1956 Summer Olympics.

He was the older brother of the triple jumper Józef Szmidt.

== International competitions ==
Year	Competition	Venue	Position	Event	Notes
Representing Poland
1955	World Festival of Youth and Students	Warsaw, Poland	2nd	200 m	21.3
1955	World Festival of Youth and Students	Warsaw, Poland	3rd	4 × 100 m relay	40.9
1956	Olympic Games	Melbourne, Australia	13th (qf)	200 m	21.73
1956	Olympic Games	Melbourne, Australia	6th	4 × 100 m relay	40.75
1958	European Championships	Stockholm, Sweden	16th (h)	100 m	11.0
1958	European Championships	Stockholm, Sweden	11th (sf)	200 m	21.9
1958	European Championships	Stockholm, Sweden	7th (h)	4 × 100 m relay	41.3

== Personal bests ==
- 100 metres – 10.4h (Poznań 1958)
- 200 metres – 21.3h (Warsaw 1955)
