= Men's 200 metres European record progression =

The following table shows the European record progression in the men's 200 metres, as ratified by the EAA

== Hand timing ==
Time	Athlete	Nationality	Venue	Date
21.2*	Willie Applegarth	United Kingdom	London, England	4 July 1914
20.9	McDonald Bailey	United Kingdom	Paris, France	10 September 1950
20.9	McDonald Bailey	United Kingdom	Belgrade, Yugoslavia	26 August 1951
20.9	McDonald Bailey	United Kingdom	London, England	24 May 1952
20.9	McDonald Bailey	United Kingdom	Berlin, Germany	21 September 1952
20.9	Heinz Futterer	West Germany	Bern, Switzerland	29 August 1954
20.8	Heinz Futterer	West Germany	Osaka, Japan	16 October 1954
20.8	Heinz Futterer	West Germany	Yokohama, Japan	31 October 1954
20.8	Manfred Germar	West Germany	Hanover, West Germany	15 September 1957
20.8	Manfred Germar	West Germany	Oslo, Norway	5 September 1958
20.8	Peter Radford	United Kingdom	Paris, France	14 September 1958
20.8	Manfred Germar	West Germany	Augsburg, West Germany	21 September 1958
20.6	Manfred Germar	West Germany	Wuppertal, West Germany	1 October 1958
20.5*	Peter Radford	United Kingdom	Wolverhampton, England	28 May 1960
20.5	Livio Berruti	Italy	Rome, Italy	3 September 1960
20.5	Livio Berruti	Italy	Rome, Italy	3 September 1960
20.4	Sergio Ottolina	Italy	Saarbrücken, West Germany	21 June 1964
20.4	Jan Werner	Poland	Warsaw, Poland	3 June 1967
20.4	Roger Bambuck	France	Paris, France	30 July 1967
20.4	Roger Bambuck	France	Mexico City, Mexico	16 October 1968
20.4	Jochen Eigenherr	Germany	Mexico City, Mexico	16 October 1968
20.3	Philippe Clerc	Switzerland	Zürich, Switzerland	4 July 1969
20.2	Valeriy Borzov	Soviet Union	Moscow, Soviet Union	18 July 1971
20.2	Pietro Mennea	Italy	Milan, Italy	17 June 1972
20.0	Valeriy Borzov	Soviet Union	Munich, West Germany	4 September 1972

(*) Performance timed over 220 yards

== Automatic timing ==
Time	Athlete	Nationality	Venue	Date
20.00	Valeriy Borzov	Soviet Union	Munich, West Germany	4 September 1972
19.96	Pietro Mennea	Italy	Mexico City, Mexico	10 September 1979
19.72	Pietro Mennea	Italy	Mexico City, Mexico	12 September 1979
