= Edward McGlynn (athlete) =

Australian sprinter

Personal information
- Nationality: Australian
- Born: 27 August 1931
- Died: 24 April 2012 (aged 80)

Sport
- Sport: Sprinting
- Event: 4 × 100 metres relay

Edward McGlynn (27 August 1931 – 24 April 2012) was an Australian sprinter. He competed in the men's 4 × 100 metres relay at the 1956 Summer Olympics.
