= Walter Mahlendorf =

German sprinter (born 1935)

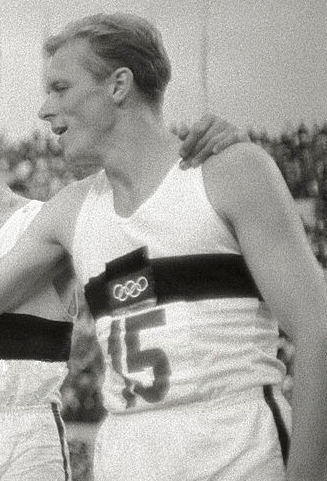
- Mahlendorf at the 1960 Olympics

Personal information
- Born: 4 January 1935 (age 91) Sarstedt, Germany
- Height: 1.82 m (6 ft 0 in)
- Weight: 81 kg (179 lb)

Sport
- Sport: Athletics
- Event: 100 m
- Club: Hannover 96

Achievements and titles
- Personal best: 100 m – 10.4 (1958)
Medal record
Men's athletics
Representing Germany
Olympic Games
Gold medal – first place	1960 Rome	4×100 m
Representing West Germany
European Championships
Gold medal – first place	1958 Stockholm	4×100 m

Walter Mahlendorf (born 4 January 1935) is a German former sprinter who won a gold medal in the 4 × 100 m relay at the 1960 Summer Olympics. The German team finished second behind the American team, equaling its own world record of 39.5, but the Americans were later disqualified for an incorrect exchange.

Mahlendorf was also a member of the German's 4 × 100 m relay team that won a gold medal at the 1958 European Championships. Mahlendorf never won a national sprint title. After retiring from competitions he worked as a director of a sports complex in Bochum.
