= Sinnayah Karuppiah Jarabalan =

Malaysian sprinter

Personal information
- Nationality: Malaysian
- Born: 1937
- Died: 1990 (aged 52–53)

Sport
- Sport: Sprinting
- Event: 100 metres

Sinnayah Karuppiah Jarabalan (1937 – 1990) was a Malaysian sprinter. He competed in the men's 100 metres at the 1956 Summer Olympics.
