= Franco Galbiati =

Italian sprinter

Personal information
- Nationality: Italian
- Born: 22 May 1938 Monza, Italy
- Died: 2 April 2013 (aged 74)

Sport
- Sport: Sprinting
- Event: 100 metres

Franco Galbiati (22 May 1938 – 2 April 2013) was an Italian sprinter. He competed in the men's 100 metres at the 1956 Summer Olympics.
