= Ray Land =

Australian sprinter (1930–2020)

Personal information
- Nationality: Australian
- Born: 14 November 1930
- Died: 14 May 2020 (aged 89)

Sport
- Sport: Sprinting
- Event: 100 metres

Ray Land (14 November 1930 – 14 May 2020) was an Australian sprinter. He competed in the men's 100 metres at the 1956 Summer Olympics.
