= Jootje Gozal =

Indonesian sprinter (1936–2020)

Personal information
- Nationality: Indonesian
- Born: 16 March 1936 Pontianak, West Kalimantan
- Died: 30 April 2020 (aged 84) Tondano, Indonesia

Sport
- Sport: Sprinting
- Event: 100 metres

Johannes Edouard Willem Gozal (16 March 1936 – 30 April 2020) was an Indonesian sprinter. He competed in the 100 metres at the 1956 Summer Olympics and the 1960 Summer Olympics.
