= Alfonso Bruno =

Venezuelan sprinter

Personal information
- Full name: Alvin Alfonso Bruno Óscar
- Born: 30 October 1933 Caracas, Venezuela
- Died: 7 August 2016 (aged 82) Caracas, Venezuela

Sport
- Sport: Sprinting
- Events: 100 metres, 200 metres

Alvin Alfonso Bruno Óscar (30 October 1933 – 7 August 2016) was a Venezuelan sprinter. He competed in the men's 4 × 100 metres relay at the 1956 Summer Olympics.

== International competitions ==
Year	Competition	Venue	Position	Event	Notes
Representing Venezuela
1956	Olympic Games	Melbourne, Australia	13th (h)	4 × 100 m relay	42.0
1959	Central American and Caribbean Games	Caracas, Venezuela	8th (h)	200 m	22.7

== Personal bests ==
- 100 metres – 10.5h (1956)
