= Lee Kah Fook =

Malaysian sprinter

Personal information
- Nationality: Malaysian
- Born: 1935 (age 90–91)

Sport
- Sport: Sprinting
- Event: 100 metres

Lee Kah Fook (born 1935) is a Malaysian sprinter. He competed in the men's 100 metres at the 1956 Summer Olympics.
