= Vanchak Voradilok =

Thai sprinter

Personal information
- Nationality: Thai
- Born: 1934
- Died: October 2017

Sport
- Sport: Sprinting
- Event: 100 metres

Vanchak Voradilok (1934 – October 2017) was a Thai sprinter. He competed in the men's 100 metres at the 1956 Summer Olympics. He was later part of the organising committee for the 1995 Southeast Asian Games, held in Thailand.
