= Roy Sandstrom =

British sprinter (1931–2019)

Personal information
- Nationality: British (English)
- Born: 11 September 1931 Kingston upon Hull, England
- Died: 19 May 2019 (aged 87) Australia
- Height: 174 cm (5 ft 9 in)
- Weight: 65 kg (143 lb)

Sport
- Sport: Athletics
- Event: Sprints
- Club: Leichtathletik Club
Medal record
Men's athletics
Representing Great Britain
European Championships
Silver medal – second place	1958 Stockholm	4 × 100 m relay
Representing England
British Empire and Commonwealth Games
Gold medal – first place	1958 Cardiff	4 × 110 yd relay

Eric Roy Sandstrom (11 September 1931 – 19 May 2019) was a track and field sprinter who competed at the 1956 Summer Olympics.

== Biography ==
Sandstrom was born in Kingston upon Hull and was educated at Kingston High School and Hull University. In 1951 he finished runner-up to Brian Shenton in the Yorkshire Championships over 100 and 220 yards. Sandstrom then went to Carnegie College, Leeds, to study physical education before joining the Royal Air Force physical fitness unit in 1954.

Sandstrom became the British 100 yards champion after winning the British AAA Championships title at the 1955 AAA Championships. He also finished runner-up behind George Ellis in the 220 yards event.

The following year Sandstrom finished third behind John Young in the 100 yards event at the 1956 AAA Championships Later that year he represented Great Britain at the 1956 Olympic Games in Melbourne, where he participated in the men's 100, 200 metres and 4 x 100 metres relay at the in Melbourne, Australia.

Sandstrom won the silver medal in the 4x100 metres relay at the 1958 European Championships in Stockholm, Sweden, alongside Peter Radford, David Segal and Adrian Breacker. He was selected for the England athletics team at the 1958 British Empire and Commonwealth Games in Cardiff, Wales, where he won gold with the same trio.

He was 1.74 m tall, weighed 65 kg, and was associated with Leichtathletik Club during his career. Sandstrom earned the rank of flight lieutenant before he emigrated to Australia, becoming a senior lecturer in physical education at the University of Melbourne. He retired in 1988 and died on 19 May 2019.
