= Abebe Hailou =

Ethiopian sprinter

Personal information
- Nationality: Ethiopian
- Born: 19 September 1933 (age 92)

Sport
- Sport: Sprinting
- Event: 100 metres

Abebe Hailou (born 19 September 1933) is an Ethiopian sprinter. He competed in the men's 100 metres at the 1956 Summer Olympics.
