= Ghanim Mahmoud =

Iraqi sprinter

Personal information
- Nationality: Iraqi
- Died: unknown

Sport
- Sport: Sprinting
- Event: 4 × 100 metres relay

Ghanim Mahmoud was an Iraqi sprinter. He competed in the men's 4 × 100 metres relay at the 1960 Summer Olympics. He was the national record holder in the 100 metres and was described as a "hero" of Iraqi sport.
