= Thane Baker =

American sprinter (born 1931)

Personal information
- Full name: Walter Thane Baker
- Born: October 4, 1931 (age 94) Elkhart, Kansas, U.S.
Medal record
Men's athletics
Representing the United States
Olympic Games
Gold medal – first place	1956 Melbourne	4 × 100 m relay
Silver medal – second place	1952 Helsinki	200 metres
Silver medal – second place	1956 Melbourne	100 metres
Bronze medal – third place	1956 Melbourne	200 metres

Walter Thane Baker (born October 4, 1931) is an American former sprinter and winner of the gold medal in the 4 × 100 m relay at the 1956 Summer Olympics in Melbourne, Australia, with a new world record of 39.5 seconds. At those Olympics, Baker also won a silver medal in the 100-meter and a bronze in the 200-meter. At the 1952 Summer Olympics in Helsinki, he won a silver medal in the 200-meter.

== Biography ==
Baker was born in Elkhart, Kansas. In 1953, as a Kansas State University student, Baker won the NCAA championship in the 220 yards (200 m), and in 1956 he won the AAU championships in 200 m. Baker also won numerous conference titles at Kansas State, and was a four-time All American.

Before the Melbourne Olympics, Baker equaled Jesse Owens's long-standing 100 m world record time of 10.2 seconds, and also twice equaled the 200 m world record of 20.6. He tied the world record in the 100 yd in 9.3 seconds, twice tied the world record in 60 yd indoor events at 6.1 seconds, and set the world record in the 300 yd at 29.4 seconds. He co-held several world records in relays.

After turning forty, Baker participated in the Masters Track and Field program and held numerous world records in the 100 yd, 100 m, 220 y, 200 m, and several relays in the age groups categories of 40–44, 45–49, and 50–54 years of age. Baker is enshrined in the USATF Masters Hall of Fame and the Kansas Sports Hall of Fame. He is also in the Kansas State University Sports Hall of Fame and the Kansas State High School Activities Hall of Fame. In 1978, he was named a "Silver Athletics Top Ten" for personal achievement.

Baker began as a track meet "starter" in 1959 and has started NCAA National Championships and National Federation Championships. The year 2010 was his forty-fourth year of serving at the Texas Relays. He was selected "Outstanding Official" by the Texas Relays Committee in 2010 and inducted into the Texas Track and Field Coaches Hall of Fame, Class of 2011. He also has the track named after him in his home town of Elkhart, Kansas.

Baker retired in 1983 as a colonel from the United States Air Force after serving thirty years of active and reserve status. Additionally, in 1992, he retired from Mobil Research and Development after thirty-nine years of employment. His civic involvement included serving as president of a Rotary Club chapter, a member of the Cotton Bowl Athletic Association board of directors, the United States Olympians board of directors, and volunteered on other boards and associations.

Thane Baker's daughter, Catherine Baker Nicholson JD, wrote a book about his first Olympics called Running in Borrowed Shoes: Thane Baker and the 1952 Summer Games, which Texas Christian University Press published in Summer 2024. Because he did not expect to make the 1952 Olympic team, Baker competed in the Men's 200 meters and won a silver medal wearing borrowed socks and borrowed shoes.

BYUtv produced a video about Thane Baker's experiences in 2024.

Baker is the oldest living United States Olympic medalist in track, and ranks third in the world in the same category.
