= Paiboon Vacharapan =

Thai sprinter

Personal information
- Nationality: Thai
- Born: 23 November 1933 (age 92)

Sport
- Sport: Sprinting
- Event: 100 metres

Paiboon Vacharapan (born 23 November 1933) is a Thai sprinter. He competed in the men's 100 metres at the 1956 Summer Olympics.
