= Leonhard Pohl =

German sprinter (1929–2014)

Personal information
- Born: 18 July 1929 Allenstein, Germany
- Died: 23 April 2014 (aged 84) Pfungstadt, Germany
Medal record
Men's athletics
Representing Germany
Olympic Games
Bronze medal – third place	1956 Melbourne	4 × 100 metre relay

Leonhard "Leo" Pohl (18 July 1929 – 23 April 2014) was a German athlete who mainly competed in the 100 metres. He was born in Allenstein (today Olsztyn, Poland) and died in Pfungstadt, Germany.

He competed for the United Team of Germany in the 1956 Summer Olympics held in Melbourne, Australia where he won the bronze medal in the 4 × 100 metre relay with his teammates Lothar Knörzer, Heinz Fütterer and Manfred Germar.
