= Stan Levenson =

Canadian sprinter (1938–2016)

Personal information
- Born: Stanley Allen Levenson; 6 February 1938 Toronto, Ontario, Canada
- Died: January 8, 2016 (aged 77) Toronto, Ontario, Canada

Sport
- Sport: Sprinting
- Event: 100 metres
Medal record
Maccabiah Games
Gold medal – first place	1961 Tel Aviv	100 m

Stanley Allen Levenson (6 February 1938 – 8 January 2016) was a Canadian sprinter. He competed in the men's 100 metres at the 1956 Summer Olympics.

He achieved success by winning the 100 m sprint at the 1961 Maccabiah Games in Israel.
