= Jack Parrington =

Canadian sprinter (1933–2024)

Personal information
- Born: 24 October 1933 Winnipeg, Manitoba, Canada
- Died: 5 March 2024 (aged 90)

Sport
- Sport: Sprinting
- Event: 100 metres

John Dempster Parrington (24 October 1933 – 5 March 2024) was a Canadian sprinter. He competed in the men's 100 metres at the 1956 Summer Olympics. That year, he tied the world record for the 100-metres dash at 10.2 seconds. He attended the University of Houston, where he was a business administration student. Parrington died at his home on 5 March 2024, at the age of 90.
