= Heinz Fütterer =

German sprinter (1931–2019)

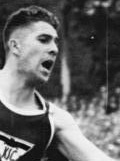
- Heinz Fütterer in 1956

Medal record

Men's athletics

Representing Germany

Olympic Games
Bronze medal – third place	1956 Melbourne	4×100 m

Representing West Germany

European Championships
Gold medal – first place	1954 Bern	100 m
Gold medal – first place	1954 Bern	200 m
Gold medal – first place	1958 Stockholm	4×100 m

Heinrich Ludwig Fütterer (German pronunciation: [haɪnts ˈfʏtəʁɐ]; 14 October 1931 – 10 February 2019) was a German athlete, who mainly competed in sprint events.

== Early life ==
He was born in Illingen.

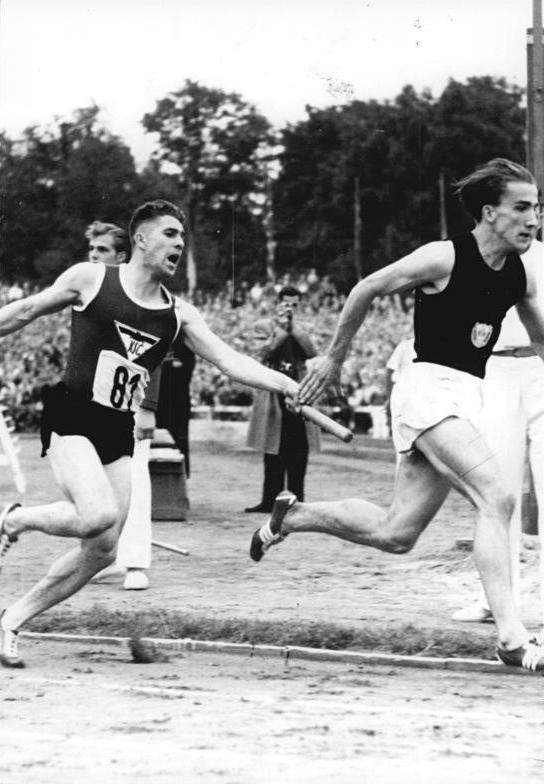
Fütterer (left) running in a 4 × 100 metres relay race with Manfred Steinbach (right) in 1956

Fütterer competed for the United Team of Germany in the 1956 Summer Olympics held in Melbourne, Australia, where he won the bronze medal in the 4 × 100 metre relay with his teammates Lothar Knörzer, Leonhard Pohl and Manfred Germar but didn't reach the 100 m final.

In 1954 he won two gold medals at the European Championships in Bern, Switzerland, in 1958 he won the relay with Germany.

His nickname was "weißer Blitz" ("white lightning").

His best time in the 100 meters was 10.2 seconds, equalling the world record held by Jesse Owens and a number of other sprinters. He ran the race in Japan (1954). His best in the 200 meters was 20.8 seconds. He was part of the German world record 4 × 100 m relay of 1958.

Fütterer died in Illingen on 10 February 2019 at the age of 87.

Awards
Preceded by (Germany) Werner Haas	German Sportsman of the Year; 1954	Succeeded by (Germany) Hans Günter Winkler
Records
Preceded by (United Kingdom) McDonald Bailey	European Record Holder Men's 100 m 31 October 1954 – 30 July 1957	Succeeded by (West Germany) Manfred Germar
Preceded by (United Kingdom) McDonald Bailey	European Record Holder Men's 200 m 29 August 1954 – 14 September 1957	Succeeded by (West Germany) Manfred Germar
