= Edmund Turton (athlete) =

Trinidad and Tobago sprinter

Edmund Albert Turton (born 29 November 1932) is a retired athlete from Trinidad and Tobago who competed mainly in the middle-distance events. He was born in San Fernando, Trinidad and Tobago. He was a member of Trinidad and Tobago team at the 1956 Summer Olympics in Melbourne, Australia. He competed in the men's 100 metres and went out in the second round.
