= Adrian Breacker =

English athlete (1934–2023)

Personal information
- Nationality: British (English)
- Born: 28 March 1934 Carshalton, Surrey
- Died: 23 February 2023 (aged 88) St Neots, Cambridgeshire

Sport
- Sport: Athletics
- Event: Sprints
- Club: Mitcham AC
Medal record
Men's athletics
Representing Great Britain
European Championships
Silver medal – second place	1958 Stockholm	4×100 m
Representing England
British Empire & Commonwealth Games
Gold medal – first place	1958 Cardiff	4×110 yards

Adrian Francis Breacker (28 March 1934 – 23 February 2023) was a male athlete who competed for England.

== Biography ==
Breacker finished second behind Ken Box in the 100 yards event at the 1957 AAA Championships.

Breacker represented England and won a gold medal running the last leg in the 4 × 110 yards relay at the 1958 British Empire and Commonwealth Games in Cardiff, Wales.

He won a silver medal at the European Championships in Stockholm in August 1958 in the 4×110yds relay.
