= Manfred Steinbach =

German sprinter and long jumper (1933–2026)

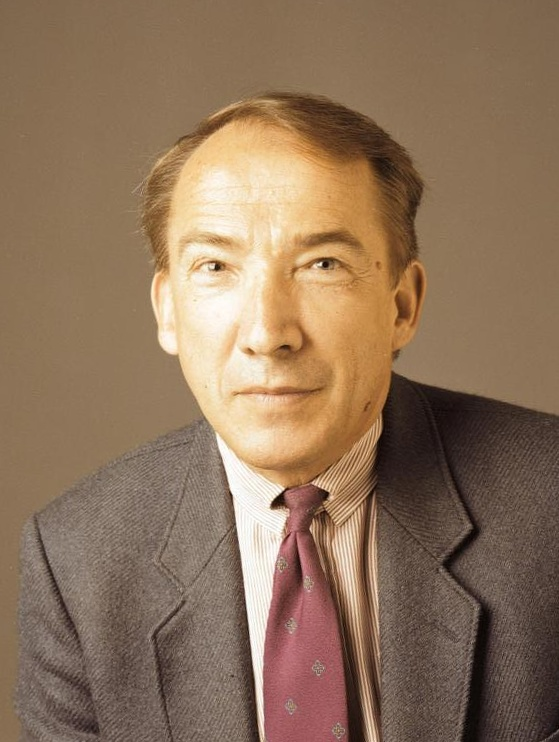
- Steinbach in 1990

Personal information
- Born: 18 August 1933 Sprottau, Lower Silesia, Prussia, Germany
- Died: 13 May 2026 (aged 92) Bad Neuenahr-Ahrweiler, Rhineland-Palatinate, Germany
- Height: 1.82 m (6 ft 0 in)
- Weight: 73 kg (161 lb)

Sport
- Sport: Sprint, long jump
- Club: HSG Wissenschaft Halle; VfL Wolfsburg

Manfred Steinbach (18 August 1933 – 13 May 2026) was a German sprinter, long jumper, professor of sport medicine and government official. He competed at the 1956 Summer Olympics in the 100 m, but failed to reach the final. In 1960 he finished in fourth place in the long jump, setting his personal best at 8.00 m. Shortly before the Olympics, in July 1960 he jumped 8.14 m, 1 cm above the 1935 record by Jesse Owens, but this jump was discounted because of lacking wind measurement. He set another, officially recognized world record in August 1958, by running the 4×100 m relay in 39.5 seconds together with Martin Lauer, Heinz Fütterer and Manfred Germar.

Steinbach was born and raised in East Germany, but in April 1958 fled to West Germany, following his parents who did so in 1953. After that his coach was accused of complicity and imprisoned.

In 1959 Steinbach graduated from a medical school in Göttingen. Two years later he became a professor of sports medicine in Mainz. In 1967 he ended his sports career and worked at the Summer Universiade in Tokyo as the German team doctor. From 1973 to 1993 he served on the board of the German Athletics Federation, and between 1965 and 1970 headed the Institute of Sports Medicine of the University of Mainz. In 1970 he moved to Wiesbaden, where until 1977 he served as Assistant Secretary at the Ministry of Social Affairs. From 1977 to 6 October 1993 he was head of the pharmacy and drugs department at the Ministry of Health. He had to resign after a scandal, in which ministry officials concealed hundreds of HIV cases resulted from transfusion of contaminated blood. Later, between 1999 and 2008 he was president of the German Spa Association and subsequently its honorary president. He also continued to be a professor of sports medicine and first aid at the University of Darmstadt.

He died on 13 May 2026, at the age of 92.
