= Bobby Morrow =

American sprinter (1935–2020)

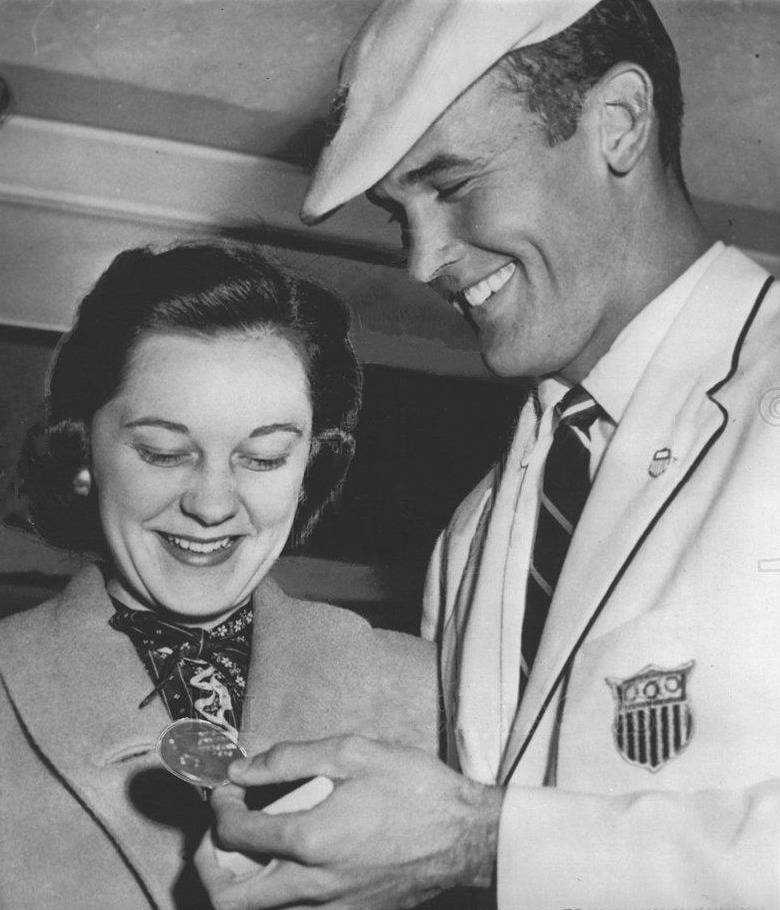
- Morrow with wife Jo Ann in 1956

Personal information
- Born: October 15, 1935 Harlingen, Texas, U.S.
- Died: May 30, 2020 (aged 84) San Benito, Texas, U.S
- Resting place: Restlawn Memorial Park; La Feria, Texas
- Height: 186 cm (6 ft 1 in)
- Weight: 75 kg (165 lb)

Sport
- Sport: Athletics
- Event: 100–400 m
- Club: ACU Wildcats, Abilene

Achievements and titles
- Personal bests: 100 m – 10.2 (1956); 200 m – 20.75 (1956); 400 m – 47.7 (1959)
Medal record
Men's athletics
Representing the United States
Olympic Games
| Gold medal – first place | 1956 Melbourne | 100 meters |
| Gold medal – first place | 1956 Melbourne | 200 meters |
| Gold medal – first place | 1956 Melbourne | 4 × 100 m relay |

Bobby Joe Morrow (October 15, 1935 – May 30, 2020) was an American sprinter who won three gold medals at the 1956 Olympics. He has been called "the dominant sprinter of the 1950s" and "the most relaxed sprinter of all time, even more so than his hero Jesse Owens".

== Early life ==
Morrow was born in Harlingen, Texas, on October 15, 1935, and raised on a cotton and carrot farm on the outskirts of San Benito, Texas. Before becoming a sprinter, Morrow played football for San Benito High School. Morrow also was a sprinter at Abilene Christian University, and became a member of the men's club Frater Sodalis in 1955.

== Career ==
Morrow won the 1955 AAU 100-yard title. His most successful season was in 1956, when he was chosen by Sports Illustrated as "Sportsman of the Year". Morrow won the sprint double in the national college championships and defended his AAU title. Morrow then went to the 1956 Summer Olympics in Melbourne, where he won three gold medals and was the leader of the American sprint team. First, he was victorious in the 100-meter dash. He then led an American sweep of the medals in the 200-meter dash, while equaling the world record at that distance with a time of 20.6 seconds (unofficially auto-timed at 20.75). He won his third gold by anchoring the 4 × 100-meter relay team to a world record time. He was the first sprinter since Jesse Owens in 1936 to win gold medals in those three events.

Morrow achieved great fame after winning his three gold medals, and was featured on the covers of Life and SPORT, as well as Sports Illustrated. He appeared on The Ed Sullivan Show, To Tell The Truth and Arthur Godfrey and His Friends, and addressed a joint session of the Texas legislature.

Morrow's success on a national level continued after the Olympics, but he retired in 1958 to become a farmer and a woodworker. He made a short comeback before the 1960 Olympic Games, but failed to qualify for the U.S. Olympic team.

== Legacy ==
In October 2006, San Benito High School named its new 12,000 seat sporting facility in San Benito, used for football and soccer, Bobby Morrow Stadium. Morrow was on hand to help dedicate the new facility. He was inducted into the National Track and Field Hall of Fame in 1989 and into the Texas Track and Field Coaches Hall of Fame in 2016.

== Personal life ==
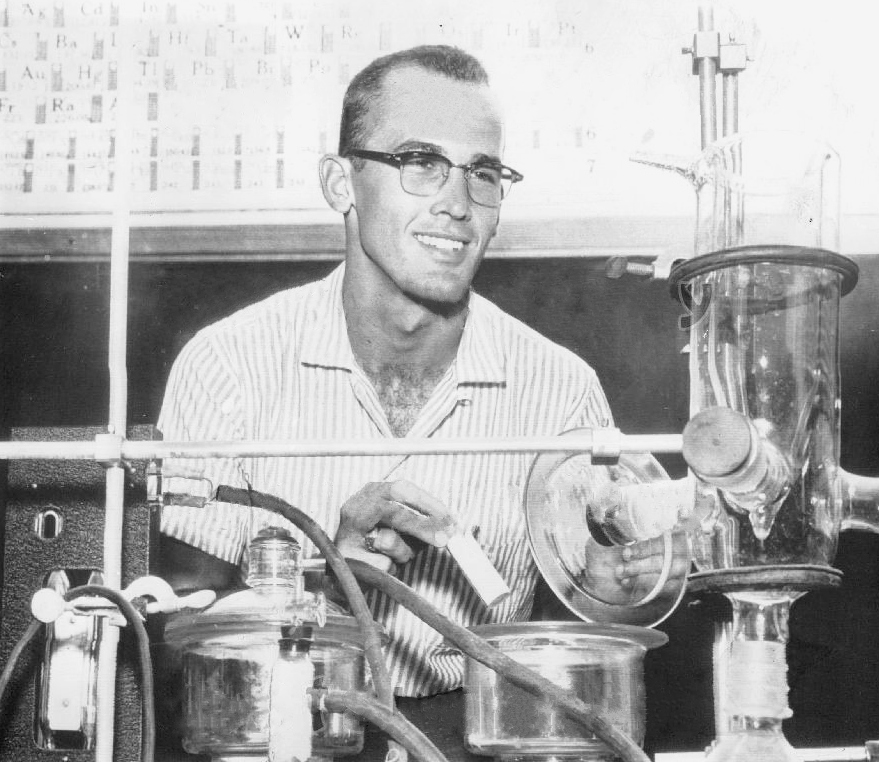
Morrow in a college chemistry lab. in 1956

Morrow was married to Jo Ann Strickland, whom he met in high school, in what was described as a "fairy-tale marriage". They moved to Odessa, and later to Houston, where he restarted his career in banking that he had put on hold to train for the 1960 Olympics. They had twins together. They divorced around 1968. He subsequently moved to Ohio, where he met and married Judy.

Morrow died of natural causes on May 30, 2020, at his home in Harlingen, Texas, at the age of 84.
