= Boris Tokarev (athlete) =

Soviet sprinter

Medal record

Men's athletics

Representing the Soviet Union

Olympic Games
Silver medal – second place	1952 Helsinki	4x100 m
Silver medal – second place	1956 Melbourne	4x100 m

European Championships
Bronze medal – third place	1954 Bern	4×100 m
Bronze medal – third place	1958 Stockholm	4×100 m

Boris Tokarev (Russian: Борис Токарев; May 16, 1927 – December 17, 2002) was a Soviet athlete who competed mainly in the 100 and 200 metres. He trained in Leningrad and later in Moscow at the Armed Forces sports society.

== Biography ==
He competed for the USSR in the 1952 Summer Olympics held in Helsinki, Finland in the 4 x 100 metre relay where he won the silver medal with his teammates Levan Kalyayev, Levan Sanadze and Vladimir Sukharev.

At the 1956 Summer Olympics held in Melbourne, Australia Boris teamed up with Vladimir Sukharyev again ran in the 4 x 100 metres relay with a new team of Leonid Bartenev and Yuriy Konovalov who again managed to finish second. He also managed a fifth place over 200 metres in Melbourne.
