= Manfred Germar =

West German sprinter (born 1935)

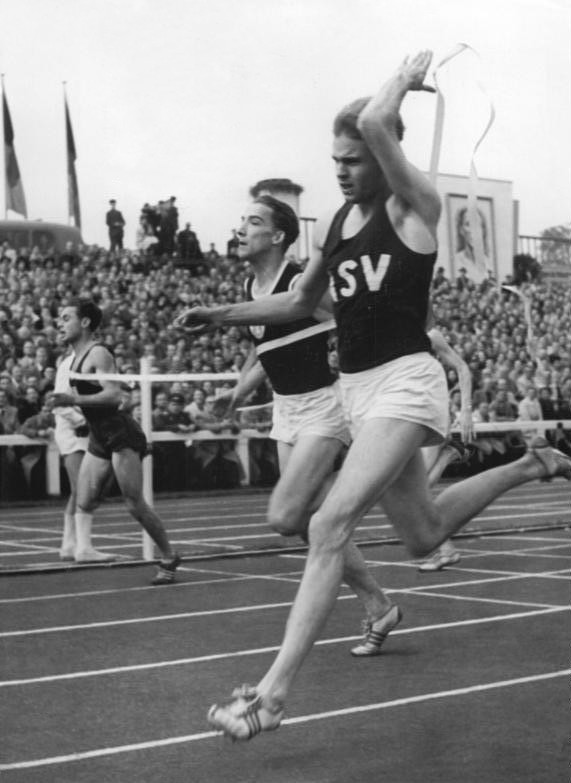
- Manfred Germar (in the front) with Manfred Steinbach, 1955

Medal record

Men's athletics

Representing Germany

Olympic Games
Bronze medal – third place	1956 Melbourne	4×100 m

Representing West Germany

European Championships
Gold medal – first place	1958 Stockholm	200 m
Gold medal – first place	1958 Stockholm	4×100 m
Gold medal – first place	1962 Belgrade	4×100 m
Silver medal – second place	1958 Stockholm	100 m

Manfred ("Manni") Germar (German pronunciation: [ˈmanˌfʁeːt ˈɡɛʁ.maːɐ̯]; born 10 March 1935 in Cologne) is a West German athlete who mainly competed in sprint events.

He competed for the United Team of Germany in the 1956 Summer Olympics held in Melbourne, Australia where he won the bronze medal in the 4 × 100 metre relay with his teammates Lothar Knörzer, Leonhard Pohl and Heinz Fütterer. In September 1957 he set a European record for 200 m in Hannover.

Awards
Preceded by (Germany) Hans Günter Winkler	German Sportsman of the Year; 1957	Succeeded by (Germany) Fritz Thiedemann
Records
Preceded by (West Germany) Heinz Futterer	European Record Holder Men's 100 m 31 July 1957 - 25 May 1960	Succeeded by (Italy) Livio Berruti
Preceded by (West Germany) Heinz Futterer	European Record Holder Men's 200 m 15 September 1957 - 13 September 1958	Succeeded by (United Kingdom) Peter Radford
Preceded by (United Kingdom) Peter Radford	European Record Holder Men's 200 m 21 September 1958 - 27 May 1960	Succeeded by (United Kingdom) Peter Radford
