= Hilmar Þorbjörnsson =

Icelandic sprinter

Personal information
- Nationality: Icelandic
- Born: 23 October 1934 Reykjavík, Iceland
- Died: 29 January 1999 (aged 64) Reykjavík, Iceland

Sport
- Sport: Sprinting
- Event: 100 metres

Hilmar Þorbjörnsson (23 October 1934 – 29 January 1999) was an Icelandic sprinter. He competed in the 100 metres at the 1956 Summer Olympics and the 1960 Summer Olympics.
