= Bjørn Nilsen (athlete) =

Norwegian sprinter

Personal information
- Nationality: Norwegian
- Born: 15 June 1937 Stavanger, Norway
- Died: 6 February 1966 (aged 28)

Sport
- Sport: Sprinting
- Event: 100 metres
- Club: IL Skjalg

Bjørn Nilsen (15 June 1937 – 6 February 1966) was a Norwegian sprinter. He competed in the men's 100 metres at the 1956 Summer Olympics.
