= Vilém Mandlík =

Czech runner (1936–2023)

Vilém Mandlík (7 April 1936 – 6 October 2023) was a Czech runner. At the 1956 Summer Olympics in Melbourne, he was a semifinalist in the 200 metres and ran for the 4 × 400m relay. He also ran in the 1960 Olympic Games in Rome. He was the father of tennis player Hana Mandlíková and the grandfather of Elizabeth Mandlik. Vilém Mandlík died on 6 October 2023, at the age of 87.
