= Livio Berruti =

Italian athlete (1939–2026)

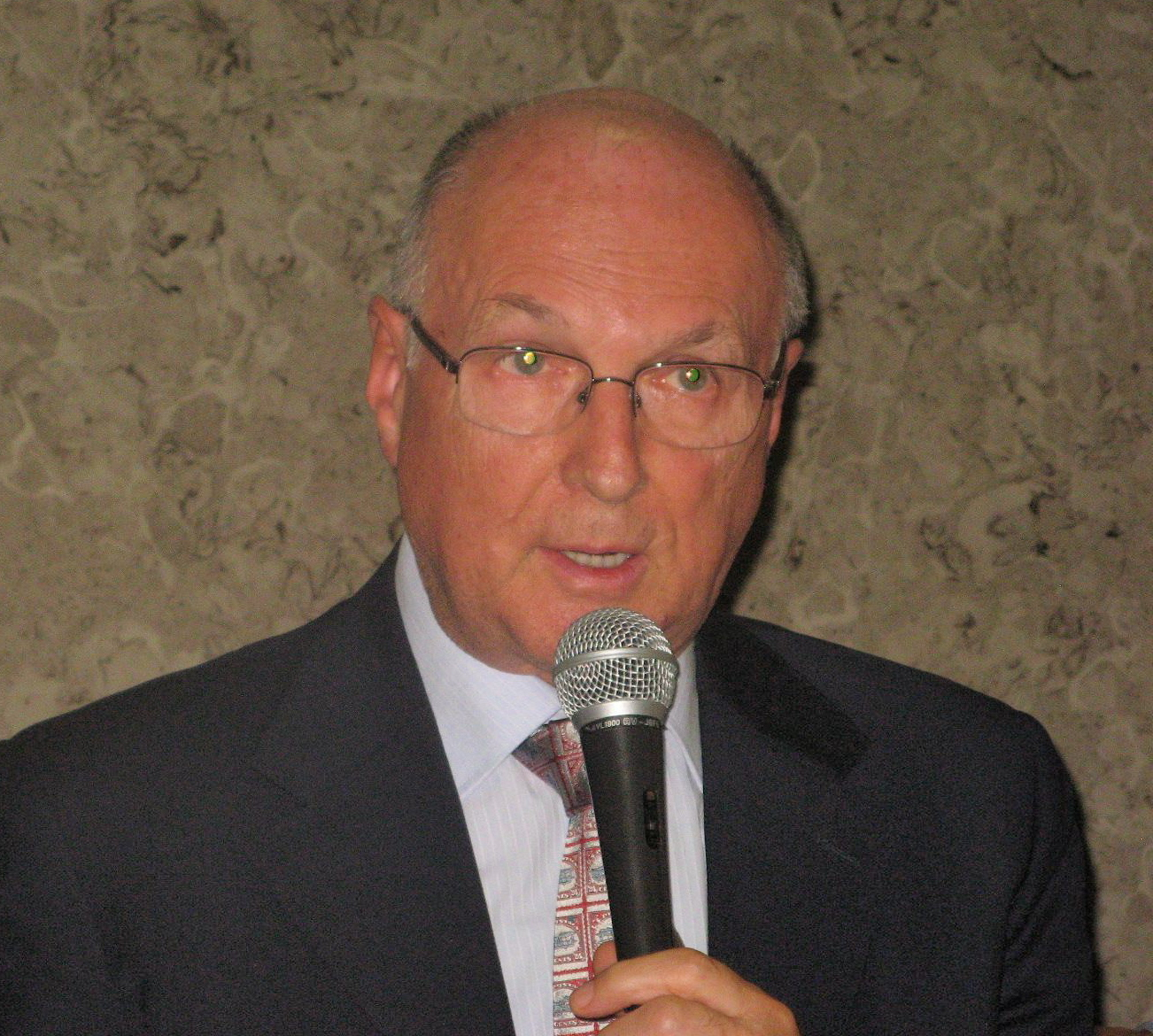
- Berruti in 2010

Personal information
- Nationality: Italian
- Born: 19 May 1939 Turin, Italy
- Died: 9 August 2026 (aged 87) Turin, Italy
- Height: 1.80 m (5 ft 11 in)
- Weight: 66 kg (146 lb)

Sport
- Country: Italy
- Sport: Athletics
- Event: Sprint
- Club: G.S. Fiamme Oro
- Coached by: Peppino Russo

Achievements and titles
- Personal bests: 100 m: 10.2 (1960); 200 m: 20.5 (1960)
Medal record
Olympic Games
Gold medal – first place	1960 Rome	200 metres
Summer Universiade
Gold medal – first place	1959 Turin	100 metres
Gold medal – first place	1959 Turin	200 metres
Gold medal – first place	1959 Turin	4 × 100 m relay
Gold medal – first place	1967 Tokyo	4 × 100 m relay
Bronze medal – third place	1963 Porto Alegre	100 metres
Bronze medal – third place	1963 Porto Alegre	200 metres
Mediterranean Games
Gold medal – first place	1963 Naples	200 metres
Gold medal – first place	1963 Naples	4 × 100 m relay
Silver medal – second place	1963 Naples	100 metres
Silver medal – second place	1967 Tunis	200 metres

Livio Berruti (19 May 1939 – 9 August 2026) was an Italian athlete who was the winner of the 200-meter dash in the 1960 Summer Olympics.

Berruti won five medals, at individual level, and three medals with the national relay team at the International athletics competitions.

== Biography ==
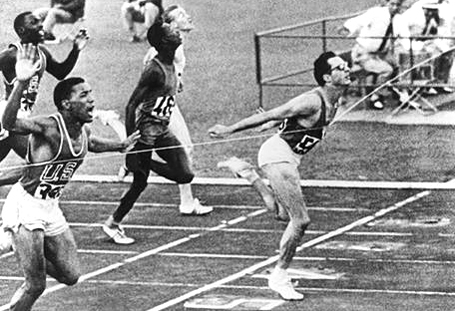
The victorious finish of the 200 metres final at 1960 Summer Olympics

Berruti was born in Turin where he attended Liceo Classico "Cavour". After high school, while pursuing a degree in chemistry, he competed in the 1960 Rome Olympics. In the semi-finals of the 200 m, spurred by the home crowd, he unexpectedly ran in 20.5 seconds, equalling the then world record for that distance. This made him a surprise outsider for the final, later that day. In that race, Berruti, who was noted for always running with black glasses and white socks, once again clocked 20.5, beating the American favourites to the gold medal.

Anchoring the Italian 4 × 100 m relay team, Berruti narrowly missed out on a second Olympic medal, finishing in 4th. His world record was not beaten until June 1962, but his performance remained a European record for a further two years, until 21 June 1964.

His Olympic victory, at the beginning of his career, would remain his best achievement. His three appearances at the European Championships only brought him a 7th place in the 1966 200 m final. He did, however, win Italian titles in both the 100 and 200 m from 1957 until 1962, and two more 200 m titles in 1965 and 1968. Berruti also made two more Olympic appearances, in 1964 and 1968. On both occasions, he reached the final of the 4 × 100 m relay, and also placed 5th in the 200 m final of 1964.

Berruti died on 9 August 2026, at the age of 87.

== Olympic results ==
Year	Competition	Venue	Position	Event	Performance	Note
1960	Olympic Games	(Italy) Rome	1st	200 metres	20.5	=
1960	Olympic Games	(Italy) Rome	4th	4 × 100 m relay	40.2	
1964	Olympic Games	(Japan) Tokyo	5th	200 metres	20.8	
1964	Olympic Games	(Japan) Tokyo	7th	4 × 100 m relay	39.5	
1968	Olympic Games	Mexico City	QF	200 metres	21.0	
1968	Olympic Games	Mexico City	7th	4 × 100 m relay	39.2	

== National titles ==
Berruti won 14 times the individual national championship.

- 6 wins in the 100 metres (1957, 1958, 1959, 1960, 1961, 1962)
- 8 wins in the 200 metres (1957, 1958, 1959, 1960, 1961, 1962, 1965, 1968)

== Awards ==
On 7 May 2015, in the presence of the President of Italian National Olympic Committee (CONI), Giovanni Malagò, was inaugurated in the Olympic Park of the Foro Italico in Rome, along Viale delle Olimpiadi, the Walk of Fame of Italian sport, consisting of 100 tiles that chronologically report names of the most representative athletes in the history of Italian sport. On each tile is the name of the sportsman, the sport in which he distinguished himself and the symbol of CONI. One of these tiles is dedicated to Livio Berruti.

== See also ==
- Italy national relay team
- Men's 100 metres European record progression
- Men's 200 metres European record progression
- Men's 200 metres world record progression
- FIDAL Hall of Fame
- Legends of Italian sport - Walk of Fame

== Bibliography ==
- Gregori, Claudio (2009). Livio Berruti—Il romanzo di un campione e del suo tempo [Livio Berruti—The romance of a champion and his time] (in Italian). Cassina de' Pecchi (Milan), Italy: Edizioni Roberto Vallardi. ISBN 978-88-95684-31-4.

Records
Preceded by Ray Norton	Men's 200 metres World Record Holder; 3 September 1960 - 23 June 1962	Succeeded by Paul Drayton
Preceded by Manfred Germar	European Record Holder Men's 100 m 26 May 1960 – 20 June 1960	Succeeded by Armin Hary
Preceded by Peter Radford	European Record Holder Men's 200 m 3 September 1960 – 20 June 1964	Succeeded by Sergio Ottolina
