= Leonid Bartenyev =

Soviet sprinter (1933–2021)

Personal information
- Born: 10 October 1933 Poltava, Soviet Union
- Died: 17 November 2021 (aged 88)

Sport
- Sport: Track and field
Medal record
Representing Soviet Union
Olympic Games
Silver medal – second place	1956 Melbourne	4×100 m
Silver medal – second place	1960 Rome	4×100 m
European Championships
Bronze medal – third place	1954 Bern	4×100 m
Bronze medal – third place	1958 Stockholm	4×100 m
Summer Universiade
Gold medal – first place	1961 Sofia	4x100m

Leonid Vladimirovich Bartenyev (Russian: Леонид Владимирович Бартенев) (10 October 1933 – 17 November 2021) was a Soviet athlete who competed mainly in the 100 metres.

== Athletic career ==
He trained at Burevestnik in Kiev. He competed for the USSR at the 1956 Summer Olympics held in Melbourne in the 4 x 100 metre relay where he won the silver medal with his teammates Boris Tokarev, Yuriy Konovalov, and Vladimir Sukharev. He teamed up with Yuriy Konovalov again four years later in the 1960 Summer Olympics held in Rome in the 4 x 100 metre relay where they won their second silver medals with new teammates Gusman Kosanov and Edvin Ozolin.
