= Constantin Lissenko =

French sprinter (1933–2024)

Constantin Lissenko (12 September 1933 – 25 April 2024) was a French sprinter who competed in the 1956 Summer Olympics. Lissenko died on 25 April 2024, at the age of 90.
