= David Segal (athlete) =

British sprinter (born 1937)

Personal information
- Nationality: British (English)
- Born: 20 March 1937 (age 89) London, England
- Height: 179 cm (5 ft 10 in)
- Weight: 1,000 kg (2,205 lb)

Sport
- Sport: Athletics
- Event: Sprints
- Club: Thames Valley Harriers
Medal record
Men's athletics
Representing Great Britain
Olympic Games
Bronze medal – third place	1960 Rome	4 × 100 m relay
European Championships
Silver medal – second place	1958 Stockholm	200 metres
Silver medal – second place	1958 Stockholm	4 × 100 m relay
Representing England
British Empire and Commonwealth Games
Gold medal – first place	1958 Cardiff	4 × 110 yd relay

David Hugh Segal (born 20 March 1937) is a British former track and field athlete who competed in the sprints who competed at the 1956 Summer Olympics and the 1960 Summer Olympics.

== Biography ==
Segal had best times of 9.5 seconds for the 100 yards and 21.0 seconds for the 220 yards. While competing in the United States, he ran a time of 20.4 seconds for the straight 220 yards. At one time, he held the English Native Record for the 220 yards and the 300 yards, running the later in 30.0 seconds. On rare occasions, he ran the 400 meters with his best time of 48.2 seconds.

Segal became the British 220 yards champion after winning the British AAA Championships titles at the 1957 AAA Championships and the 1958 AAA Championships.

In between he represented Great Britain at the 1956 Olympic Games in Melbourne, in the 4 × 100 m relay and placed 5th in the final. He was a European 200m silver medalist in 1958.

Segal was selected for the England athletics team at the 1958 British Empire and Commonwealth Games in Cardiff, Wales and won a gold medal in the relay.

Segal missed out on the title at the 1959 AAA Championships and 1960 AAA Championships, losing to David Jones. At the 1960 Olympic Games in Rome, he represented Great Britain, in the 4 x 100 metre relay where he won the bronze medal with his teammates Peter Radford, David Jones and Neville Whitehead. In Rome he was in the 200m semi-final but was disqualified for two false starts. While not his favorite distance, he had been ranked as high as 8th in the world in the 200m by Track and Field News.

Following the 1960 Olympics, Segal left the Unite Kingdom for Furman University in Greenville, South Carolina, where he continued his track career. He continued to live in the United States since then. In 2008 Segal was inducted into the Athletic Hall of Fame at his alma mater, Furman University, where as a competitor in the Southern Conference Championships he won nine individual titles and five relay championships.

At the 1961 Maccabiah Games in Israel, he won the 200 m race, and took a gold medal in the 1600 m relay.
