= Emmanuel Putu =

Liberian sprinter

Personal information
- Nationality: Liberian
- Born: 5 December 1938 (age 86) Sasstown Territory, Liberia

Sport
- Sport: Sprinting
- Event: 100 metres

Emmanuel Putu (born 5 December 1938) is a Liberian sprinter. He competed in the 100 metres at the 1956 Summer Olympics and the 1960 Summer Olympics.
