= James Roberts (Liberian athlete) =

Liberian sprinter

Personal information
- Nationality: Liberian
- Born: 29 September 1936 (age 89) Montserrado, Liberia

Sport
- Sport: Sprinting
- Event: 100 metres

James Roberts (born 29 September 1936) is a Liberian sprinter. He competed in the 100 metres at the 1956 Summer Olympics and the 1960 Summer Olympics.

Roberts was one of the first four Liberian athletes to compete at the Olympics in 1956, and he was one of three to return in 1960.
