= Béla Goldoványi =

Hungarian sprinter (1925–1972)

Medal record

Men's athletics

Representing Hungary

Olympic Games
Bronze medal – third place	1952 Helsinki	4×100 m

European Championships
Gold medal – first place	1954 Bern	4×100 m

Béla Goldoványi (20 December 1925 in Budapest – 16 November 1972 in Budapest) was a Hungarian athlete, who mainly competed in the 100 metres.

He competed for Hungary in the men's 4 × 100 metres relay at the 1952 Summer Olympics held in Helsinki, Finland, where he won the bronze medal with his teammates László Zarándi, Géza Varasdi and György Csányi.

== Competition record ==
Year	Competition	Venue	Position	Event	Notes
Representing Hungary
1948	Olympics	London, England	5th, QF 2	100 m	
