= Yuriy Konovalov (athlete) =

Soviet sprinter

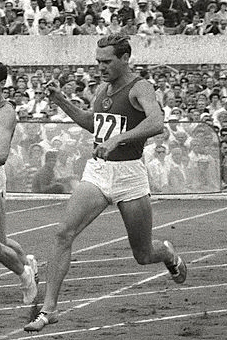
- Yuriy Konovalov at the 1960 Olympics

Personal information
- Born: 30 December 1929 Baku, Transcaucasian SFSR, Soviet Union
- Died: 25 May 2008 (aged 78) Smolensk, Russia
- Height: 1.83 m (6 ft 0 in)
- Weight: 77 kg (170 lb)

Sport
- Sport: Athletics
- Event: Sprint running
- Club: Neftçi Baku

Achievements and titles
- Personal bests: 100 m – 10.3 (1957); 200 m – 20.9 (1960)
Medal record
Men's athletics
Representing Soviet Union
Olympic Games
Silver medal – second place	1956 Melbourne	4×100 m
Silver medal – second place	1960 Rome	4×100 m
European Championships
Bronze medal – third place	1958 Stockholm	4×100 m

Yuriy Semyonovich Konovalov (Russian: Юрий Семёнович Коновалов, 30 December 1929 – 25 May 2008) was a Soviet sprinter.

== Career ==
He competed at the 1956 and 1960 Olympics in the 100 m, 200 m and 4 × 100 m relay events and won two silver medals, both in the relay. He also won a bronze medal in the relay at the 1958 European Championships. Domestically he won two titles, in the 100 m in 1957, and in the 200 m in 1958.
