= Athletics at the 1954 British Empire and Commonwealth Games – Men's 220 yards =

Men's 220 yards at the Commonwealth Games
- Venue: Empire Stadium
- Dates: 4 and 6 August

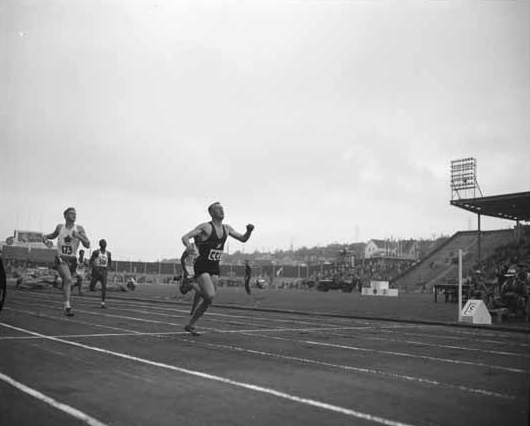
A 220 yards race at the games. Attribution:Province newspaper

The men's 220 yards event at the 1954 British Empire and Commonwealth Games was held on 4 and 6 August at the Empire Stadium in Vancouver, Canada.

== Medalists ==
Gold	Silver	Bronze
Don Jowett; New Zealand	Brian Shenton; England	Ken Jones; Wales

== Results ==
=== Heats ===
Held on 5 August

Qualification: First 2 in each heat (Q) qualify directly for the semifinals.

Rank	Heat	Name	Nationality	Time	Notes
1	1	Don Jowett	New Zealand	21.8	Q
2	1	Harry Nelson	Canada	22.1	Q
3	1	Ben Nduga	Uganda	22.3	
4	1	Les Laing	Jamaica	22.9	
5	1	Abdul Aziz	Pakistan	23.8	
	1	Alan Lillington	England	DNS	
1	2	Hector Hogan	Australia	22.2	Q
2	2	Estefaino Xavier	Hong Kong	22.7	Q
3	2	Henry Ofori-Nayako	Gold Coast	22.9	
4	2	Pat Walker	Canada	22.9	
5	2	Titus Erinle	Nigeria	24.1	
1	3	Mike Agostini	Trinidad and Tobago	22.2	Q
2	3	Bruce Springbett	Canada	22.5	Q
3	3	John Quartey	Gold Coast	22.9	
4	3	Leonard Dames	Bahamas	23.9	
	3	Ken Box	England	DNS	
1	4	George Ellis	England	22.2	Q
2	4	Ronald Horsham	Jamaica	22.5	Q
3	4	Muslim Arogundade	Nigeria	22.6	
4	4	Mohamed Aslam	Pakistan	23.2	
5	4	Orien Young	Bermuda	23.8	
1	5	Brian Shenton	England	22.2	Q
2	5	Muhammad Sharif Butt	Pakistan	22.9	Q
3	5	Frank Hall	Jamaica	23.6	
4	5	Alfred Brown	Southern Rhodesia	24.0	
	5	Edward Ajado	Nigeria	DNS	
1	6	Ken Jones	Wales	22.4	Q
2	6	Abdul Karim Amu	Nigeria	22.5	Q
3	6	Don McFarlane	Canada	22.6	
4	6	Fitzroy Bates	Trinidad and Tobago	23.1	
	6	Allan Moore	Jamaica	DNS	

=== Semifinals ===
Held on 5 August

Qualification: First 3 in each heat (Q) qualify directly for the final.

Rank	Heat	Name	Nationality	Time	Notes
1	1	Don Jowett	New Zealand	21.9	Q
2	1	Brian Shenton	England	22.1	Q
3	1	Hector Hogan	Australia	22.3	Q
4	1	Ronald Horsham	Jamaica	22.3	
5	1	Bruce Springbett	Canada	22.4	
6	1	Abdul Karim Amu	Nigeria	22.7	
1	2	George Ellis	England	22.0	Q
2	2	Ken Jones	Wales	22.1	Q
3	2	Harry Nelson	Canada	22.3	Q
4	2	Mike Agostini	Trinidad and Tobago	22.3	
5	2	Muhammad Sharif Butt	Pakistan	22.9	
6	2	Estefaino Xavier	Hong Kong	23.2	

=== Final ===
Held on 6 August

Rank	Name	Nationality	Time	Notes
1st place, gold medalist(s)	Don Jowett	New Zealand	21.5	
2nd place, silver medalist(s)	Brian Shenton	England	21.5	
3rd place, bronze medalist(s)	Ken Jones	Wales	21.9	
4	Harry Nelson	Canada	22.0	
5	Hector Hogan	Australia	22.0	
6	George Ellis	England	22.2	
