= Athletics at the 1954 British Empire and Commonwealth Games – Men's 4 × 110 yards relay =

Men's 4 × 110 yards relay at the Commonwealth Games
- Venue: Empire Stadium
- Dates: 7 August

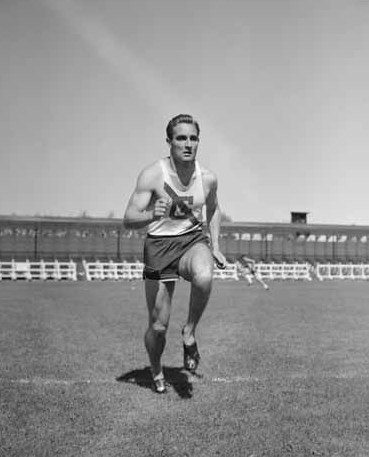
Don Stonehouse of Canada was part of the gold medal winning team Attribution:Province newspaper

The men's 4 × 110 yards relay event at the 1954 British Empire and Commonwealth Games was held on 7 August at the Empire Stadium in Vancouver, Canada.

== Medalists ==
Gold	Silver	Bronze
Canada; Bruce Springbett; Don Stonehouse; Harry Nelson; Don McFarlane	Nigeria; Muslim Arogundade; Abdul Karim Amu; Karim Olowu; Edward Ajado	Australia; David Lean; Hector Hogan; Brian Oliver; Kevan Gosper

== Results ==
=== Heats ===
Qualification: First 3 teams of each heat (Q) qualified directly for the final.

Rank	Heat	Nation	Athletes	Time	Notes
1	1	Nigeria	Muslim Arogundade, Abdul Karim Amu, Karim Olowu, Edward Ajado	41.8	Q
2	1	Canada	Bruce Springbett, Don Stonehouse, Harry Nelson, Don McFarlane	41.9	Q
3	1	Australia	David Lean, Hector Hogan, Brian Oliver, Kevan Gosper	?	Q
4	1	Fiji	Arthur Eustace, Josefa Sadulu, Mesulame Rakuro, Tito Ele	44.5	
1	2	England	Brian Shenton, George Ellis, Alan Lillington, Ken Box	42.3	Q
2	2	Jamaica	Keith Gardner, Frank Hall, Ron Horsham, Les Laing	42.3	Q
3	2	Pakistan	Abdul Aziz, Mohamed Aslam, Muhammad Sharif Butt, Abdul Khaliq	42.5	Q
4	2	Uganda	Benjamin Kiyini Nduga, John Agoro, Lawrence Ogwang, Yekoyasi Kasango	43.1	

=== Final ===
Rank	Nation	Athletes	Time	Notes
1st place, gold medalist(s)	Canada	Bruce Springbett, Don Stonehouse, Harry Nelson, Don McFarlane	41.3	GR
2nd place, silver medalist(s)	Nigeria	Muslim Arogundade, Abdul Karim Amu, Karim Olowu, Edward Ajado	41.3	
3rd place, bronze medalist(s)	Australia	David Lean, Hector Hogan, Brian Oliver, Kevan Gosper	41.7	
4	England	Brian Shenton, George Ellis, Alan Lillington, Ken Box	41.9	
5	Pakistan	Abdul Aziz, Mohamed Aslam, Muhammad Sharif Butt, Abdul Khaliq	42.0	
6	Jamaica	Keith Gardner, Frank Hall, Ron Horsham, Les Laing	?	
