= Athletics at the 1954 British Empire and Commonwealth Games – Men's 100 yards =

Event in the 1954 British Empire and Commonwealth Games

Men's 100 yards at the 1954 British Empire and Commonwealth Games
- Venue: Empire Stadium
- Date: 1 August
- Competitors: 31 from 13 nations
- Winning time: 9.6

Medalists
gold medal	Mike Agostini	Trinidad and Tobago
silver medal	Don McFarlane	Canada
bronze medal	Hector Hogan	Australia

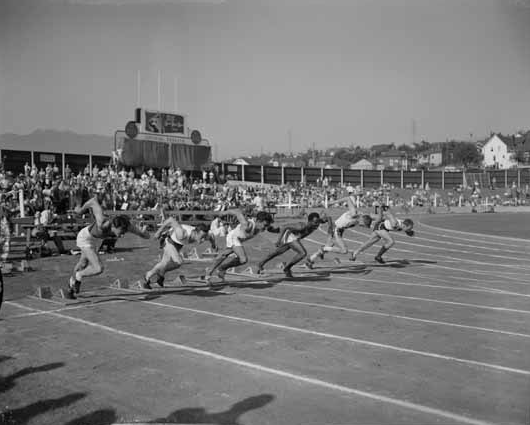
110 yards race at the games. Attribution:Province newspaper

The men's 100 yards event at the 1954 British Empire and Commonwealth Games was held on 1 August at the Empire Stadium in Vancouver, Canada.

== Results ==
=== Heats ===
Qualification: First 2 in each heat (Q) qualify directly for the semifinals.

Rank	Heat	Name	Nationality	Time	Notes
1	1	Harry Nelson	Canada	9.8	Q
2	1	Hector Hogan	Australia	9.8	Q
3	1	Abdul Khaliq	Pakistan	9.9	Q
4	1	Karim Olowu	Nigeria	10.0	
5	1	Alan Lillington	England	10.0	
6	1	Orien Young	Bermuda	10.2	
7	1	Yekoyasi Kasango	Uganda	10.3	
	1	Louis Knight	Jamaica	DNS	
1	2	Mike Agostini	Trinidad and Tobago	9.8	Q
2	2	George Ellis	England	9.8	Q
3	2	Bruce Springbett	Canada	9.9	Q
4	2	Abdul Karim Amu	Nigeria	10.0	
5	2	Mohamed Aslam	Pakistan	10.2	
6	2	Estefaino Xavier	Hong Kong	10.2	
	2	Josefa Sadulu	Fiji	DNS	
	2	Frank Hall	Jamaica	DNS	
1	3	Edward Ajado	Nigeria	9.9	Q
2	3	Ken Jones	Wales	10.0	Q
3	3	Ben Nduga	Uganda	10.0	Q
4	3	Ken Box	England	10.1	
5	3	James Warner	Canada	10.1	
6	3	Les Laing	Jamaica	10.4	
7	3	Irrington Isaacs	Bahamas	10.7	
	3	Kevan Gosper	Australia	DNS	
1	4	Don McFarlane	Canada	9.9	Q
2	4	Brian Shenton	England	9.9	Q
3	4	Mohamed Sharif Butt	Pakistan	10.0	Q
4	4	Ronald Horsham	Jamaica	10.0	
5	4	Muslim Arogundade	Nigeria	10.1	
6	4	Leonard Dames	Bahamas	10.3	
	4	Fitzroy Bates	Trinidad and Tobago	DNS	

=== Semifinals ===
Qualification: First 3 in each heat (Q) qualify directly for the final.

Rank	Heat	Name	Nationality	Time	Notes
1	1	Edward Ajado	Nigeria	9.7	Q
2	1	Hector Hogan	Australia	9.7	Q
3	1	Don McFarlane	Canada	9.8	Q
4	1	Ben Nduga	Uganda	9.8	
5	1	George Ellis	England	9.9	
6	1	Abdul Khaliq	Pakistan	10.0	
1	2	Mike Agostini	Trinidad and Tobago	9.7	Q
2	2	Harry Nelson	Canada	9.8	Q
3	2	Ken Jones	Wales	9.8	Q
4	2	Bruce Springbett	Canada	9.9	
5	2	Brian Shenton	England	9.9	
6	2	Mohamed Sharif Butt	Pakistan	9.9	

=== Final ===
Rank	Name	Nationality	Time	Notes
1st place, gold medalist(s)	Mike Agostini	Trinidad and Tobago	9.6	=GR
2nd place, silver medalist(s)	Don McFarlane	Canada	9.7	
3rd place, bronze medalist(s)	Hector Hogan	Australia	9.7	
4	Edward Ajado	Nigeria	9.7	
5	Harry Nelson	Canada	9.7	
6	Ken Jones	Wales	9.8	
