= Athletics at the 1954 British Empire and Commonwealth Games – Men's long jump =

Men's long jump at the Commonwealth Games
- Venue: Empire Stadium
- Dates: 6 August

The men's long jump event at the 1954 British Empire and Commonwealth Games was held on 6 August at the Empire Stadium in Vancouver, Canada.

== Results ==
Rank	Name	Nationality	#1	#2	#3	#4	#5	#6	Result	Notes
1st place, gold medalist(s)	Ken Wilmshurst	England	7.23	7.31	x	7.29	x	7.54	24 ft 8 3/4 in (7.54 m)	GR
2nd place, silver medalist(s)	Karim Olowu	Nigeria							24 ft 3 in (7.39 m)	
3rd place, bronze medalist(s)	Sylvanus Williams	Nigeria							23 ft 8 1/2 in (7.23 m)	
4	Derek Cox	England							23 ft 7 3/4 in (7.21 m)	
5	Hector Hogan	Australia							23 ft 2 in (7.06 m)	
6	Alfred Brown	Northern Rhodesia							23 ft 1 1/2 in (7.05 m)	
7	Benjamin Laryea	Gold Coast							22 ft 2 1/4 in (6.76 m)	
8	Graham Turnbull	Canada							22 ft 1 1/2 in (6.74 m)	
9	Keith Gardner	Jamaica							21 ft 10 1/4 in (6.66 m)	
10	Benjamin Brooks	Canada							21 ft 6 3/4 in (6.57 m)	
11	David Stafford	Canada							21 ft 2 3/4 in (6.47 m)	
12	Lenwood Goodine	Canada							20 ft 11 3/4 in (6.39 m)	
	Brian Oliver	Australia							DNS	
	Ken Box	England							DNS	
	Louis Knight	Jamaica							DNS	
	Lawrence Ogwang	Uganda							DNS	
