= Nigeria at the 1956 Summer Olympics =

- IOC code: NGR
- NOC: Nigeria Olympic Committee

in Melbourne/Stockholm
- Medals: Gold 0 Silver 0 Bronze 0 Total 0

Summer Olympics appearances (overview)
- 1952; 1956; 1960; 1964; 1968; 1972; 1976; 1980; 1984; 1988; 1992; 1996; 2000; 2004; 2008; 2012; 2016; 2020; 2024

Nigeria competed at the 1956 Summer Olympics in Melbourne, Australia.

== Results by event ==
=== Athletics ===
==== 100 m ====
- Edward Ajado
- Round 1: in the Heat 11 (rank 1) qualified for the quarterfinals, 10.8 seconds (hand-stopped), 11.01 seconds (automatically stopped)
- Quarterfinals: eliminated in the 3rd Run (rank 5), 10.9 seconds (hand-stopped), 11.02 seconds (automatically stopped)
- Titus Erinle
- 1. Round: eliminated in the 2nd Run (rank 3), 10.9 seconds (hand-stopped), 11.09 seconds (automatically stopped)
- Thomas Obi
- 1. Round: eliminated in the 7th Run (rank 5), 11.0 seconds (hand-stopped), 11.10 seconds (automatically stopped)

==== 4 × 100 meters relay ====
- Edward Ajado, Abdul Amu, Titus Erinle and Rafiu Oluwa
- Round one: eliminated in the 4th Run, 47.3 seconds (hand-stopped), 47.39 seconds (automatically stopped), disqualified

==== 400 m ====
- Abdul Amu
- 1. Round: eliminated in the 3rd Run (rank 5), 49.4 seconds (hand-stopped), 49.57 seconds (automatically stopped)

==== Triple jump ====
- Paul Bamela Engo
- Qualification round: 14.81 meters, qualified for the final
- Try one: 14.81 meters
- Try two: omitted
- Try three: omitted
- Final: 15.03 meters, rank 17
- Try one: 14.98 meters
- Try two: 15.03 meters
- Try three: 14.87 meters
- Peter Esiri
- Qualification round: 14.93 meters, 16th place qualified for the final
- Try one: 14.93 meters
  Try two: omitted
  Try three: omitted
- Final round: no valid distance, rank 22
- Try one: invalid
  Try two: invalid
  Try three: omitted

==== High jump ====
- Julius Chigbolu
- Qualification round: 1.92 meters, rank 4, qualified for the final
- 1.70 meters: valid, without failed attempt
- 1.78 meters: omitted
- 1.82 meters: valid, without failed attempt
- 1.88 meters: omitted
- 1.92 meters: valid, without failed attempt
- Final round: 2.00 meters, rank 9
- 1.80 meters: omitted
- 1.86 meters: valid, a failed attempt
- 1.92 meters: valid, two failed attempts
- 1.96 meters: valid, a failed attempt
- 2.00 meters: valid, without failed attempt
- 2.03 meters: invalid, three failed attempts
- Vincent Gabriel
- Qualification round: 1.92 meters, 22nd place qualified for the final
- 1.70 meters: valid, without failed attempt
- 1.78 meters: omitted
- 1.82 meters: omitted
- 1.88 meters: valid, two failed attempts
- 1.92 meters: valid, a failed attempt
- Final round: 1.92 meters, rank 19
- 1.80 meters: valid, without failed attempt
- 1.86 meters: valid, without failed attempt
- 1.92 meters: valid, two failed attempts
- 1.96 meters: invalid, three failed attempts

==== Long jump ====
- Karim Olowu
- Qualification round: 7.29 meters, rank 10, qualified for the final
- Try one: 7.05 meters
- Try two: 7.29 meters
- Try three: omitted
- Final round: 7.36 meters, rank 5
- Try one: 7.28 meters
- Try two: 6.77 meters
- Try three: 7.36 meters
- Try four: 6.42 meters
- Try five: invalid
- Attempt six: 6.91 meters
- Rafiu Oluwa
- Qualification round: 6.53 meters, rank 29
- Try one: invalid
- Try two: 6.53 meters
- Try three: invalid
