= 1956 AAA Championships =

Outdoor track and field competition

- Dates: 13–14 July 1956
- Host city: London, England
- Venue: White City Stadium
- Level: Senior
- Type: Outdoor

The 1956 AAA Championships was the 1956 edition of the annual outdoor track and field competition organised by the Amateur Athletic Association (AAA). It was held from 13 to 14 July 1956 at White City Stadium in London, England.

== Summary ==
The Championships covered two days of competition. The marathon was held in Port Sunlight, Merseyside and the decathlon event was held in Loughborough.

== Results ==
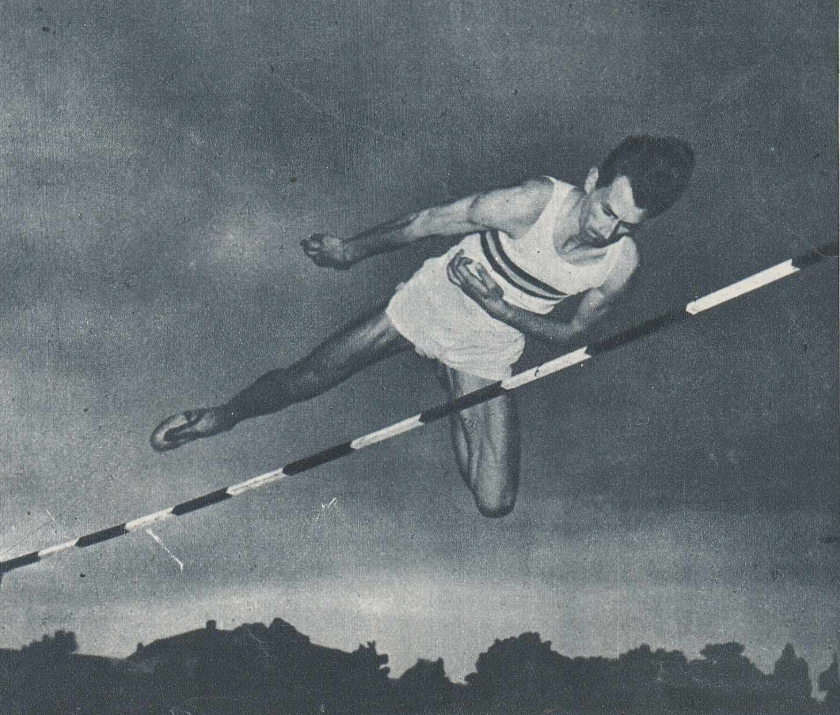
Ion Soeter won the high jump

Event	Gold		Silver		Bronze	
100 yards	John Young	9.9	Titus Erinle	9.9	Roy Sandstrom	10.0
220 yards	Brian Shenton	21.8	(Romania) Ion Wiesenmayer	21.9	Mike Ruddy	22.0
440 yards	Mike Wheeler	47.7	Peter Higgins	48.5	John Salisbury	48.7
880 yards	Mike Rawson	1:51.3	Mike Farrell	1:52.2	Ron Henderson	1:52.5
1 mile	Ken Wood	4:06.8	Brian Hewson	4:07.4	Ian Boyd	4:09.6
3 miles	Derek Ibbotson	13:32.6	Chris Chataway	13:32.6	Fred Wyatt	13:50.2
6 miles	Ken Norris	28:13.6 NR	Frank Sando	28:14.2	Hugh Foord	28:30.6
marathon	Harry Hicks	2:26:15.0	Stan Cox	2:27:17	Eric L. Smith	2:27:35
steeplechase	Eric Shirley	8:51.6	(Wales) John Disley	8:53.4	Chris Brasher	9:02.6
120y hurdles	Peter Hildreth	14.5	(Republic of Ireland) Eamonn Kinsella	14.6	Jack Parker	14.6
220y hurdles	Paul Vine	24.5	David R Kay	24.9	Donal O'Sullivan	25.0
440y hurdles	(Romania) Ilie Savel	52.2	Tom Farrell	53.0	John Metcalf	54.6
2 miles walk	Bob Goodall	14:20.8	Gareth Howell	14:25.0	George Williams	14:34.8
7 miles walk	George Coleman	50:19.0	Stan Vickers	52:45.2	Alf Poole	53:11.8
high jump	(Romania) Ion Soeter	1.930	Oladipo Okuwobi	1.905	(Republic of Ireland) Brendan O'Reilly	1.880
pole vault	Ian Ward	3.96	Geoff Elliott	3.81	George Broad	3.81
long jump	Roy Cruttenden	7.25	Ken Box	7.02	Ken Wilmshurst	7.01
triple jump	Ken Wilmshurst	15.16	(Malaysia) Tan Eng Yoon	14.67	Paul Engo	14.36
shot put	Barclay Palmer	16.51	John Savidge	15.11	Arthur Rowe	14.63
discus throw	Mark Pharaoh	50.02	Gerry Carr	48.82	Eric Cleaver	45.06
hammer throw	Peter Allday	57.28	Don Anthony	56.94	(Scotland) Ewan Douglas	55.68
javelin throw	Peter Cullen	65.28	Clive Loveland	61.98	Raymond Davies	61.30
decathlon	(Rhodesia) Gerald Brown	4934	Vic Matthews	4862	Graham Millar	4465

== See also ==
- 1956 WAAA Championships
