= Athletics at the 1954 British Empire and Commonwealth Games – Men's triple jump =

Men's triple jump at the Commonwealth Games
- Venue: Empire Stadium
- Dates: 4 August

The men's triple jump event at the 1954 British Empire and Commonwealth Games was held on 4 August at the Empire Stadium in Vancouver, Canada.

== Results ==
Rank	Name	Nationality	Result	Notes
1st place, gold medalist(s)	Ken Wilmshurst	England	50 ft 1 1/2 in (15.28 m)	
2nd place, silver medalist(s)	Peter Esiri	Nigeria	50 ft 0 1/2 in (15.25 m)	
3rd place, bronze medalist(s)	Brian Oliver	Australia	49 ft 8 1/4 in (15.14 m)	
4	George Armah	Gold Coast	47 ft 3 1/2 in (14.41 m)	
5	Robert McLaughlin	Canada	47 ft 0 3/4 in (14.34 m)	
6	Lawrence Ogwang	Uganda	46 ft 4 1/4 in (14.13 m)	
7	Jack Smyth	Canada	44 ft 6 in (13.56 m)	
8	Victor Cassis	Canada	43 ft 7 in (13.28 m)	
9	Thomas Skimming	Canada	43 ft 5 1/4 in (13.24 m)	
