= 1957 AAA Championships =

Outdoor track and field competition

- Dates: 12–13 July 1957
- Host city: London, England
- Venue: White City Stadium
- Level: Senior
- Type: Outdoor

The 1957 AAA Championships was the annual outdoor track and field competition organised by the Amateur Athletic Association (AAA). The event took place from 12 to 13 July 1957 at White City Stadium in London, England.

== Summary ==
The Championships spanned two days of competition, with the marathon held in Watford and the decathlon taking place in Loughborough.

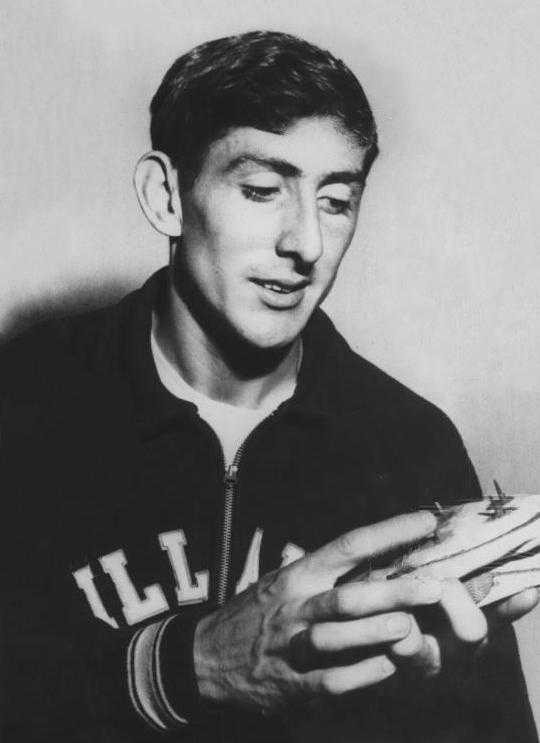
Ron Delany

== Results ==
Event	Gold		Silver		Bronze	
100 yards	Ken Box	10.0	Adrian Breacker	10.0	Charlie Williams	10.1
220 yards	David Segal	21.9	(Australia) Brian Randall	22.1	Alan Playle	22.3
440 yards	Peter Higgins	47.6	John Salisbury	47.8	John Wrighton	47.9
880 yards	(Republic of Ireland) Ron Delany	1:49.6	Mike Rawson	1:50.0	Ted Buswell	1:51.0
1 mile	Brian Hewson	4:06.7	(Scotland) Mike Berisford	4:07.5	(Scotland) Graham Everett	4:07.5
3 miles	Derek Ibbotson	13:20.8 NR	Roger Dunkley	13:41.0	Kevin Gilligan	13:42.0
6 miles	George Knight	28:50.4	Stan Eldon	28:50.8	Alan Perkins	28:53.0
marathon	Eddie Kirkup	2:22:27.8	Arthur Keily	2:22:34	Jack Haslam	2:24:00
steeplechase	(Wales) John Disley	8:56.8	Eric Shirley	9:05.0	Anthony Llewellyn	9:06.0
120y hurdles	(Republic of Ireland) Eamonn Kinsella	14.7	Peter Hildreth	14.7	David Carrington	15.0
220y hurdles	John Scott-Oldfield	24.2	Paul Vine	24.6	Colin Andrews	24.9
440y hurdles	Tom Farrell	52.1	John Metcalf	52.8	Harry Kane	53.4
2 miles walk	Stan Vickers	14:05.6	Bob Goodall	14:12.0	Colin Williams	14:17.8
7 miles walk	Stan Vickers	51:34.4	Eric Hall	51:49.0	Bob Goodall	53:06.0
high jump	Oladipo Okuwobi	1.956	Dave Wilson	1.880	Peter Hogben	1.880
pole vault	Ian Ward	4.09	George Broad	3.81	Rex Porter	3.81
long jump	Roy Cruttenden	7.26	Ronald Coleman	7.06	Peter Whaley	7.02
triple jump	Ken Wilmshurst	14.86	Paul Engo	14.77	John Whall	14.55
shot put	Arthur Rowe	16.38	John Savidge	16.08	Martyn Lucking	15.59
discus throw	(Scotland) Mike Lindsay	50.76	Gerry Carr	50.72	(Scotland) Peter Isbester	47.34
hammer throw	Mike Ellis	60.28 NR	Don Anthony	57.08	Percy Porter	52.32
javelin throw	Peter Cullen	72.12 NR	Colin Smith	71.00 NR	Clive Loveland	67.72
decathlon	(Wales) Hywel Williams	5370	(Switzerland) Hans Graf	4817	(Rhodesia) Gerald Brown	4798

== See also ==
- 1957 WAAA Championships
