= 1953 AAA Championships =

Outdoor track and field competition

- Dates: 10–11 July 1953
- Host city: London, England
- Venue: White City Stadium
- Level: Senior
- Type: Outdoor

The 1953 AAA Championships was the 1953 edition of the annual outdoor track and field competition organised by the Amateur Athletic Association (AAA). It was held from 10 to 11 July 1953 at White City Stadium in London, England.

== Summary ==
The Championships covered two days of competition. The marathon was held in Cardiff and the decathlon event was held in Uxbridge.

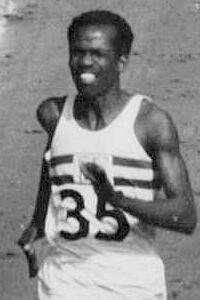
McDonald Bailey won both the 100 and 200 for his 13th & 14th titles

== Results ==
| Event | Gold | | Silver | | Bronze | |
|---|---|---|---|---|---|---|
| 100 yards | McDonald Bailey | 9.8 | Karim Olowu | 10.0 | (Bermuda) Orien Young | 10.2 |
| 220 yards | McDonald Bailey | 21.4 | Brian Shenton | 21.9 | Clay Gibbs | 22.3 |
| 440 yards | Peter Fryer | 48.9 | Len Smith | 49.4 | David Rawe | 49.5 |
| 880 yards | Brian Hewson | 1:54.2 | Desmond Williamson | 1:54.6 | Tom White | 1:54.8 |
| 1 mile | Roger Bannister | 4;05.2 | Don Seaman | 4:08.0 | Bill Nankeville | 4;10.4 |
| 3 miles | Gordon Pirie | 13:43.4 | Fred Green | 13:46.0 | Len Eyre | 14:02.0 |
| 6 miles | Gordon Pirie | 28:19.4 WR | Frank Sando | 28:47.2 | (Scotland) Ian Binnie | 28:53.4 |
| marathon | Jim Peters | 2:22:29.0 | Alan Lawton | 2:29:38 | Geoff Iden | 2:30:54 |
| steeplechase | Eddie Ellis | 10:02.8 | Ken Johnson | 10:03.6 | Walter Berry | 10:14.2 |
| 120y hurdles | Peter Hildreth | 14.6 | Paul Vine | 15.0 | Donal O'Sullivan | 15.1 |
| 220y hurdles | Harry Whittle | 24.2 | Peter Hildreth | 24.4 | Paul Vine | 24.4 |
| 440y hurdles | Harry Whittle | 52.7 NR | Alec Hardy | 53.1 | (Puerto Rico) Amadeo Francis | 54.2 |
| 2 miles walk | George Coleman | 14:02.2 | Bryan Hawkins | 14:05.8 | Bob Richards | 14:10.2 |
| 7 miles walk | Roland Hardy | 51:47.0 | Bryan Hawkins | 54:23.0 | John Proctor | 54:59.0 |
| high jump | Derek Cox | 1.905 | (Republic of Ireland) Brendan O'Reilly | 1.880 | Kinnaird Cunningham | 1.854 |
| pole vault | Geoff Elliott | 4.11 | (Socialist Federal Republic of Yugoslavia) Milan Milakov | 4.11 | Ian Ward | 3.81 |
| long jump | Karim Olowu | 7.15 | Peter Whaley | 7.14 | Roy Cruttenden | 6.99 |
| triple jump | Ken Wilmshurst | 14.36 | William Laing | 14.28 | (Saar Protectorate) Willi Burgard | 14.13 |
| shot put | John Savidge | 16.17 | (Socialist Federal Republic of Yugoslavia) Petar Sarcevic | 14.99 | Mark Pharaoh | 13.88 |
| discus throw | Mark Pharaoh | 47.96 | (Socialist Federal Republic of Yugoslavia) Vitomir Krivokapić | 47.28 | John Savidge | 44.65 |
| hammer throw | Don Anthony | 53.24 | Peter Allday | 52.86 | (Scotland) Ewan Douglas | 52.72 |
| javelin throw | Michael Denley | 63.58 | (Socialist Federal Republic of Yugoslavia) Branko Dangubić | 63.38 | Kevin Flanagan | 61.78 |
| decathlon | Les Pinder | 5321 | Hywel Williams | 5035 | Vic Matthews | 4806 |

== See also ==
- 1953 WAAA Championships
