= Nigeria at the 1952 Summer Olympics =

- IOC code: NGR
- NOC: Nigeria Olympic Committee

in Helsinki
- Competitors: 9 in 1 sport
- Medals: Gold 0 Silver 0 Bronze 0 Total 0

Summer Olympics appearances (overview)
- 1952; 1956; 1960; 1964; 1968; 1972; 1976; 1980; 1984; 1988; 1992; 1996; 2000; 2004; 2008; 2012; 2016; 2020; 2024

Nigeria competed in the Summer Olympic Games for the first time at the 1952 Summer Olympics in Helsinki, Finland.

== Results by event ==
=== Athletics ===
Men's 100M

- Edward Ajado

- First Round — 11.25s DNQ

- Titus Erinle

- First Round — 11.12 DNQ

Men's 200M

- Edward Ajado

- First Round — 22.92s DNQ

- Muslim Arogundade

- First Round — 22.71 DNQ

- Rafiu Oluwa

- First Round — 22.89 (Q)
- Quarterfinals — 22.69 DNQ

Men's 4x100 relay

- First Round — (Muslim Arongudade, Titus Erinle, Karim Olowu, Rafiu Oluwa) 42.4s (Q)
- Semifinals — 41.9 5th DNQ

Long Jump

- Karim Olowu

- First Round — 6.96 DNQ

- Sylvanus Williams

- First Round — 6.98 DNQ

High Jump

- Josiah Majekodunmi

- First Round — 1.87m (Qualified)
- Final — 1.90m 9th

- Nafiu Osagie

- First Round — 1.87m (Qualified)
- Final — 1.90m 18th

- Boniface Guobadia

- First Round — 1.87m (Qualified)
- Final — 1.80m 20th
