= Clive Roberts =

Clive Roberts may refer to:

- Clive Roberts (rower)
- Clive Roberts (cricketer)
- Clive Roberts (javelin thrower)
