= 1954 AAA Championships =

Outdoor track and field competition

- Dates: 9–10 July 1954
- Host city: London, England
- Venue: White City Stadium
- Level: Senior
- Type: Outdoor

The 1954 AAA Championships was the 1954 edition of the annual outdoor track and field competition organised by the Amateur Athletic Association (AAA). It was held from 9 to 10 July 1954 at White City Stadium in London, England.

== Summary ==
The Championships covered two days of competition. The marathon was held from Windsor to Chiswick and the decathlon event was held in Uxbridge. The steeplechase was run as the 3,000 metres steeplechase for the first time instead of the 2 miles steeplechase.

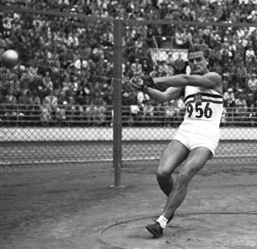
József Csermák

== Results ==
Event	Gold		Silver		Bronze	
100 yards	George Ellis	9.9	Karim Olowu	9.9	Ken Box	9.9
220 yards	Brian Shenton	21.5	George Ellis	21.5	Clay Gibbs	21.6
440 yards	Peter Fryer	48.4	Derek Johnson	48.6	Peter Higgins	48.7
880 yards	Brian Hewson	1:52.2	Ron Henderson	1:52.2	Bill Aylett	1:53.4
1 mile	Roger Bannister	4:07.6	Ian Boyd	4:10.4	David Law	4:10.6
3 miles	Fred Green	13:32.2 WR	Chris Chataway	13:32.2 =WR	Nyandika Maiyoro	13:54.8
6 miles	Peter Driver	28:34.8	Frank Sando	28:38.2	Ken Norris	28:46.0
marathon	Jim Peters	2:17:39.4 WR	Stan Cox	2:23:08	Eric L. Smith	2:27:04
steeplechase	Ken Johnson	9:00.8	(Hungary) László Jeszenszky	9:00.8	Eric Shirley	9:04.0
120y hurdles	Jack Parker	14.7	Peter Hildreth	14.7	(Republic of Ireland) Eamonn Kinsella	14.8
220y hurdles	Peter Hildreth	24.6	Michael Jenkins	25.1	Donal O'Sullivan	25.5
440y hurdles	Harry Kane	53.4	(Wales) Bob Shaw	53.4	(Scotland) David Gracie	53.7
2 miles walk	George Coleman	13:52.6	Bob Richards	14:06.6	Terry Whitlock	14:17.6
7 miles walk	George Coleman	51:22.8	Bryan Hawkins	52:26.4	Bob Goodall	54:18.4
high jump	(Republic of Ireland) Brendan O'Reilly	1.956	Patrick Etolu	1.930	Jonathan Lenemuria	1.905
pole vault	(Hungary) Tamás Homonnay	4.26	Geoff Elliott	4.11	Geoffrey Schmidt	3.81
long jump	(Hungary) Ödön Földessy	7.48	Roy Cruttenden	7.22	Karim Olowu	7.17
triple jump	Ken Wilmshurst	14.87	Paul Engo	14.83	Peter Esiri	14.65
shot put	John Savidge	15.54	Mark Pharaoh	14.27	Robert Wilkins	13.89
discus throw	(Hungary) Ferenc Klics	51.34	Mark Pharaoh	47.76	John Savidge	46.16
hammer throw	(Hungary) József Csermák	59.42	(Scotland) Alec Valentine	53.92	Don Anthony	52.58
javelin throw	Maurice Morrell	60.60	Raymond Davies	60.30	Maboria Kirogu	60.10
decathlon	Les Pinder	5415	Keith Parker	4753	Deric Bareford	4555

== See also ==
- 1954 WAAA Championships
