= Athletics at the 1955 Summer International University Sports Week – Men's 110 metres hurdles =

The men's 110 metres hurdles event at the 1955 Summer International University Sports Week was held in San Sebastián on 11, 12 and 14 August 1955.

== Medalists ==
Gold	Silver	Bronze
Ezio Nardelli; Italy	Jan Parlevliet; Netherlands	Vic Matthews; Great Britain

== Results ==
=== Heats ===
Rank	Heat	Athlete	Nationality	Time	Notes
1	1	Chris Higham	Great Britain	15.8	Q
2	1	Sebastián Junqueras	Spain	17.0	Q
1	2	Jan Parlevliet	Netherlands	15.2	Q
2	2	Vic Matthews	Great Britain	15.8	Q
3	2	Valerio Colatore	Italy	15.9	Q
4	2	Heinrich Casper	West Germany	16.2	
1	3	Mustapha Marhoum	Egypt	15.9	Q
2	3	Pierre Bultiauw	Belgium	16.1	Q
3	3	Donal O'Sullivan	Great Britain	17.6	Q
1	4	Ezio Nardelli	Italy	15.2	Q
2	4	Rudolf Böck	West Germany	15.3	Q
3	4	Emilio Francisco Campra	Spain	16.8	Q
4	4	Schiltz	Luxembourg	18.8	

=== Semifinals ===
Rank	Heat	Athlete	Nationality	Time	Notes
1	1	Chris Higham	Great Britain	14.7	Q, =GR
2	1	Rudolf Böck	West Germany	15.4	Q
3	1	Mustapha Marhoum	Egypt	15.5	Q
4	1	Sebastián Junqueras	Spain	15.5	
	1	Valerio Colatore	Italy	?	
1	2	Ezio Nardelli	Italy	15.1	Q
2	2	Jan Parlevliet	Netherlands	15.1	Q
3	2	Vic Matthews	Great Britain	15.4	Q
4	2	Donal O'Sullivan	Great Britain	15.7	
5	2	Pierre Bultiauw	Belgium	15.8	
	2	Emilio Francisco Campra	Spain	DNF	

=== Final ===
Rank	Name	Nationality	Time	Notes
1st place, gold medalist(s)	Ezio Nardelli	Italy	15.2	
2nd place, silver medalist(s)	Jan Parlevliet	Netherlands	15.4	
3rd place, bronze medalist(s)	Vic Matthews	Great Britain	15.4	
4	Mustapha Marhoum	Egypt	15.6	
	Chris Higham	Great Britain	DQ	FS
	Rudolf Böck	West Germany	DQ	FS
