= Athletics at the 1954 British Empire and Commonwealth Games – Men's marathon =

Men's marathon at the Commonwealth Games
- Venue: Empire Stadium (start and finish)
- Dates: 7 August

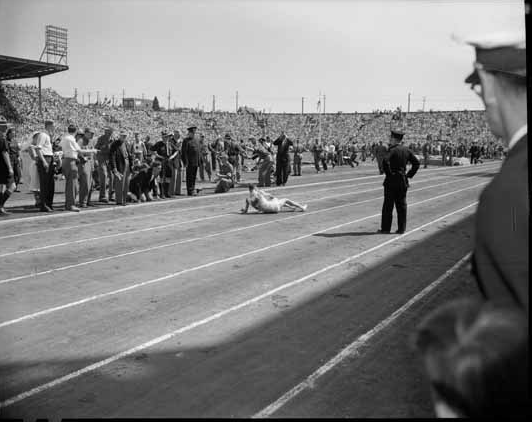
Jim Peters collapses again in the final stages Attribution:Province newspaper

The men's marathon event at the 1954 British Empire and Commonwealth Games was held on 7 August in Vancouver, Canada with a start and finish at the Empire Stadium.

Jim Peters, then the world record holder in the marathon, entered the stadium in first place, believed to be 17 minutes ahead of the next runner and 10 minutes ahead of the Games record but he collapsed seven times (one of the times laying down for over 2 minutes) and he eventually failed to finish, being disqualified after collapsing into the arms of an official. After covering just 200 metres in 11 minutes, he was stretchered away and never raced again. "I was lucky not to have died that day", he later said.

The race was won by Scotsman Joe McGhee.

== Results ==
Rank	Name	Nationality	Time	Notes
1st place, gold medalist(s)	Joe McGhee	Scotland	2:39:36	
2nd place, silver medalist(s)	Jackie Mekler	South Africa	2:40:57	
3rd place, bronze medalist(s)	Jan Barnard	South Africa	2:51:50	
4	Barry Lush	Canada	2:52:48	
5	George Hillier	Canada	2:58:44	
6	Bob Crossan	Northern Ireland	3:00:13	
	Al Lawrence	Australia	DNF	
	Bryce Mackay	Australia	DNF	
	Rowland Guy	Australia	DNF	
	Gérard Côté	Canada	DNF	
	George Norman	Canada	DNF	
	Keith Dunnet	Canada	DNF	
	Les Stokell	Canada	DNF	
	Stan Cox	England	DNF	
	Jim Peters	England	DNF	
	John Kay	Northern Rhodesia	DNF	
