= Athletics at the 1954 British Empire and Commonwealth Games – Men's javelin throw =

Men's javelin throw at the Commonwealth Games
- Venue: Empire Stadium
- Dates: 6 August

The men's javelin throw event at the 1954 British Empire and Commonwealth Games was held on 6 August at the Empire Stadium in Vancouver, Canada.

== Results ==
Rank	Name	Nationality	Result	Notes
1st place, gold medalist(s)	James Achurch	Australia	224 ft 9 1/2 in (68.52 m)	GR
2nd place, silver medalist(s)	Muhammad Nawaz	Pakistan	223 ft 4 1/2 in (68.08 m)	
3rd place, bronze medalist(s)	Jalal Khan	Pakistan	221 ft 5 1/2 in (67.50 m)	
4	Dennis Tucker	England	216 ft 7 in (66.01 m)	
5	John Veitch	South Africa	204 ft 6 in (62.33 m)	
6	Maboria Tesot	Kenya	203 ft 0 1/2 in (61.89 m)	
7	Kevin Flanagan	Northern Ireland	202 ft 4 in (61.67 m)	
8	Viliame Liga	Fiji	199 ft 8 in (60.86 m)	
9	Semi Qio	Fiji	194 ft 9 in (59.36 m)	
10	William Donawa	Trinidad and Tobago	182 ft 1 1/2 in (55.51 m)	
11	Clive Roberts	Wales	180 ft 7 1/2 in (55.05 m)	
12	Tito Ele	Fiji	176 ft 8 1/2 in (53.86 m)	
13	Ian Hume	Canada	174 ft 5 in (53.16 m)	
14	Ted Cadell	Canada	158 ft 3 1/2 in (48.25 m)	
	John Pavelich	Canada	DNS	
	Robert Johnson	Canada	DNS	
