= 1955 AAA Championships =

Outdoor track and field competition

- Dates: 15–16 July 1955
- Host city: London, England
- Venue: White City Stadium
- Level: Senior
- Type: Outdoor

The 1955 AAA Championships was the 1955 edition of the annual outdoor track and field competition organised by the Amateur Athletic Association (AAA). It was held from 15 to 16 July 1955 at White City Stadium in London, England.

== Summary ==
The Championships covered two days of competition. The marathon was held in Reading and the decathlon event was held in Loughborough.

== Results ==
Event	Gold		Silver		Bronze	
100 yards	Roy Sandstrom	10.0	(Romania) Ion Wiesenmayer	10.1	Alan Thomas	10.1
220 yards	George Ellis	22.0	Roy Sandstrom	22.0	(Scotland) Willie Henderson	22.1
440 yards	Peter Fryer	47.7	Mike Wheeler	47.7	Peter Higgins	48.5
880 yards	Derek Johnson	1:51.4	Ron Henderson	1:51.4	Jack Douglas	1:51.9
1 mile	Brian Hewson	4:05.4	Ken Wood	4:06.2	Brian Jackson	4:08.6
3 miles	Chris Chataway	13:33.6	Derek Ibbotson	13:37.0	Tony Barrett	13:46.6
6 miles	Ken Norris	29:00.6	Frank Sando	29:31.0	Jack Heywood	29:31.8
marathon	Bill McMinnis	2:39:35.0	Geoff Iden	2:50:06.6	(South Africa) Jackie Mekler	2:50:49
steeplechase	(Wales) John Disley	8:56.6	Chris Brasher	8:59.4	Eric Shirley	9:03.4
120y hurdles	Jack Parker	14.6	(Romania) Ion Opris	14.6	Peter Hildreth	14.7
220y hurdles	Paul Vine	23.7 NR	(Wales) Bob Shaw	23.8	Dennis Merrett	24.7
440y hurdles	(Wales) Bob Shaw	52.2	(Romania) Ilie Savel	52.6	Tom Farrell	53.0
2 miles walk	George Coleman	14:01.0	Alf Poole	14:15.8	George Williams	14:47.0
7 miles walk	Roland Hardy	53:04.6	George Coleman	53:32.2	Alf Poole	54:26.2
high jump	(Scotland) William Piper	1.905	Oladipo Okuwobi	1.905	Charles Van Dyck	1.854
pole vault	Geoff Elliott	4.11	(Norway) Hermund Hogheim	3.96	Geoffrey Schmidt	3.81
long jump	Karim Olowu	7.36	Roy Cruttenden	6.93	David Brigden	6.87
triple jump	Ken Wilmshurst	15.17	Paul Engo	14.97	David Field	14.39
shot put	Barclay Palmer	15.11	Mark Pharaoh	14.50	William Robbins	13.64
discus throw	Mark Pharaoh	47.72	Gerry Carr	44.50	(Norway) Erling Helle	42.82
hammer throw	(Scotland) Ewan Douglas	56.52	(Romania) Constantin Dumitru	54.90	Peter Allday	54.26
javelin throw	(Romania) Dumitru Zamfir	67.90	Dennis Tucker	64.18	Peter Cullen	62.56
decathlon	Malcolm Dodds	4690	Deric Bareford	4516	Keith Parker	4375

== See also ==
- 1955 WAAA Championships
