= Leslie Laing =

Jamaican sprinter (1925–2021)

Personal information
- Nationality: Jamaican
- Born: 19 February 1925 Linstead, Saint Catherine, Jamaica
- Died: 7 February 2021 in (aged 95) Clermont, Florida, USA
- Height: 164 cm (5 ft 5 in)
- Weight: 55 kg (121 lb)

Sport
- Sport: Athletics
- Event: Sprints
- Club: Polytechnic Harriers
Medal record
Athletics
Representing Jamaica
Olympic Games
Gold medal – first place	1952 Helsinki	4 × 400 m relay
Central American and Caribbean Games
Silver medal – second place	1950 Guatemala City	4 × 100 m relay
Bronze medal – third place	1950 Guatemala City	4 × 400 m relay

Leslie Alphonso "Les" Laing (19 February 1925 – 7 February 2021) was a Jamaican athlete and a winner of gold medal in 4 × 400 m relay at the 1952 Summer Olympics.

== Biography ==
Born in Linstead, Jamaica, Laing previously competed in the 1948 Summer Olympics, where he finished sixth in 200 m and was eliminated in the heats of 100 m. He probably missed a medal when Arthur Wint pulled a muscle in the 4 × 400 m relay final.

Laing finished second behind McDonald Bailey in both the 100 yards and 220 yards events at the British 1949 AAA Championships.

At the Helsinki Olympics, Laing was fifth in the 200 m and ran the second leg in the Jamaican 4 × 400 m relay team, which won the gold medal with a new world record of 3:03.9.

Laing was an All-American sprinter for the Fresno State Bulldogs track and field team, finishing 3rd in the 100 m and 200 m at the 1953 NCAA track and field championships.

Laing married Fresno State classmate Carmen Phipps in August 1953. In 2005 he was inducted into the Central American and Caribbean Confederation Hall of Fame. He died twelve days short of his 96th birthday.

== Competition record ==
Year	Competition	Venue	Position	Event	Notes
Representing Jamaica
1948	Olympic Gamess	London, United Kingdom	24th (h)	100 m	11.0
1948	Olympic Gamess	London, United Kingdom	6th	200 m	22.02
1948	Olympic Gamess	London, United Kingdom	2nd (h)	4 × 400 m relay	3:14.0^{1}
1950	Central American and Caribbean Games	Guatemala City, Guatemala	5th	100 m	10.6
1950	Central American and Caribbean Games	Guatemala City, Guatemala	4th	200 m	NT
1950	Central American and Caribbean Games	Guatemala City, Guatemala	2nd	4 × 100 m relay	41.6
1950	Central American and Caribbean Games	Guatemala City, Guatemala	3rd	4 × 400 m relay	3:19.0
1952	Olympic Games	Helsinki, Finland	5th	200 m	21.45
1952	Olympic Games	Helsinki, Finland	1st	4 × 400 m relay	3:04.04
1954	Central American and Caribbean Games	Mexico City, Mexico	2nd	100 m	10.66
1954	Central American and Caribbean Games	Mexico City, Mexico	1st	200 m	21.66
1954	Central American and Caribbean Games	Mexico City, Mexico	1st	4 × 100 m relay	41.06
1954	Central American and Caribbean Games	Mexico City, Mexico	1st	4 × 400 m relay	3:12.25
1954	British Empire and Commonwealth Games	Vancouver, Canada	25th (h)	100 y	10.4
1954	British Empire and Commonwealth Games	Vancouver, Canada	15th (h)	220 y	22.9
1954	British Empire and Commonwealth Games	Vancouver, Canada	6th	4 × 110 y relay	NT
1954	British Empire and Commonwealth Games	Vancouver, Canada	6th	4 × 440 y relay	3:19.0

^{1}Did not finish in the final
