= Jackie Mekler =

South African long-distance runner (1932–2019)

Personal information
- Nationality: South African
- Born: 4 March 1932 Johannesburg, South Africa
- Died: 1 July 2019 (aged 87)

Sport
- Sport: Athletics
- Event: long distance
Medal record
Representing South Africa
Silver medal – second place	1954 Vancouver	Marathon

Jack Mekler (4 March 1932 – 1 July 2019) was a South African long-distance runner.

== Biography ==
Mekler was born in Johannesburg, South Africa. His parents emigrated to South Africa from Eastern Europe in the 1920s. His mother developed Parkinson's disease and at the age of nine he was sent by his father to live at the Arcadia Orphanage. His early life was spent in Johannesburg, where he attended Parktown Boys' High School.

At the age of thirteen, Mekler decided to improve his health and fitness by running. When he was sixteen, he joined the Germiston Callies club and started serious long-distance running. He won the Comrades Marathon five times as well as various other marathons around the world. He competed for South Africa in various international games.

Mekler finished seventh in the 1952 Comrades Marathon, became the Southern Transvaal Marathon Champion in 2:42:57 and won the Durban Athletic Club Marathon. In 1953 he finished fifth in the Comrades Marathon and defended his two marathon titles.

In 1954, he improved in a marathon in Port Elizabeth at 2:28:58 and one week later was the South African marathon champion in 2:35:26. He represented South Africa at the 1954 British Empire and Commonwealth Games in Vancouver, where he won the silver medal behind Scotland's Joe McGhee in marathon competition, and in the fall he again won the South Transvaal Championship and the Durban Athletic Club marathon.

Mekler finished third behind Bill McMinnis and Geoff Iden in the marathon event at the British 1955 AAA Championships.

In 1957, he was again national marathon champion. In 1958 followed a third place in the South African Marathon Championship, his first victory in the Comrades Marathon. In 1959 he was third in the Comrades Marathon. In 1960, he finished second in the South African Marathon Championship, remained at the Comrades Marathon at 5:56:32 h, first on the up-run track under six hours and won the London to Brighton Race.

In 1962, he was second in the Comrades Marathon, and in 1963 he set a track record of 5:51:20. In 1964, he was with his personal best of 2:27:54 h second in the South African Marathon Championship for whites. At the Comrades Marathon he won for the fourth time. In 1965, he finished second there, in 1968 he moved with his fifth triumph with the previous record winners Arthur FH Newton, Hardy Ballington and Wally Hayward equal, and in 1969 he was third.

In May 2019, Mekler published his autobiography Running Alone. Mekler died in Cape Town on 1 July 2019 aged 87 years old. During his running career, he finished 41 marathons, winning 14, and 32 ultramarathons, winning 13. In addition, he raced in 403 races under the marathon distance.

A 25 km Jackie Mekler race is held annually in Gauteng in his honour.
