= Clive Loveland =

English athlete (born 1934)

Personal information
- Nationality: British (English)
- Born: 19 November 1934 (age 90) Manchester, England

Sport
- Sport: Athletics
- Event: javelin throw
- Club: Army AC; London Athletic Club

Clive Norbert Loveland (born 19 November 1934) is a former athlete who competed for England.

== Biography ==
Loveland finished second behind Peter Cullen in the javelin throw event at the 1956 AAA Championships and third behind Cullen at the 1957 AAA Championships.

Loveland represented the England athletics team in the javelin at the 1958 British Empire and Commonwealth Games in Cardiff, Wales.

Loveland reached the podium twice more at the AAA Championships, finishing second behind John McSorley at the 1962 AAA Championships and third behind Dave Travis at the 1965 AAA Championships.

In later life he lived in Banbury, Oxfordshire.
