= Athletics at the 1955 Summer International University Sports Week – Men's discus throw =

The men's discus throw event at the 1955 International University Sports Week was held in San Sebastián on 13 August 1955.

== Medalists ==
Gold	Silver	Bronze
Martin Bührle; West Germany	Luitpold Maier; West Germany	Luis Ortiz Urbina; Spain

== Results ==
=== Qualification ===
Rank	Athlete	Nationality	Result	Notes
1	Martin Bührle	West Germany	47.37	Q
2	Luitpold Maier	West Germany	45.85	Q
3	Luis Ortiz Urbina	Spain	42.12	Q
4	Christian Dewaay	Belgium	41.37	Q
5	Alfonso Vidal-Quadras	Spain	41.03	Q
6	Budd	Great Britain	40.65	Q
7	Heinz Lutter	West Germany	40.33	
8	Vic Matthews	Great Britain	34.87	
	Robbins	Great Britain	NM	

=== Final ===
Rank	Name	Nationality	Result	Notes
1st place, gold medalist(s)	Martin Bührle	West Germany	47.65	
2nd place, silver medalist(s)	Luitpold Maier	West Germany	46.61	
3rd place, bronze medalist(s)	Luis Ortiz Urbina	Spain	44.54	
4	Christian Dewaay	Belgium	43.03	
5	Alfonso Vidal-Quadras	Spain	41.48	
6	Budd	Great Britain	40.65	
