= Raymond Davies (athlete) =

English javelin thrower

Personal information
- Nationality: British (English)
- Born: 9 September 1933 Romford, Essex, England
- Died: 12 July 2018 (aged 84) Gloucester, England

Sport
- Sport: Athletics
- Event: javelin
- Club: London University AC; Hornchurch Harriers

Raymond Arthur Charles Davies (9 September 1933–12 July 2018) was a male athlete who competed for England.

== Biography ==
Davies was born in Romford during 1933 to Arthur Davies, a London dock official, and Elsie, a chiropodist. Davied grew up in Hornchurch and was educated at Brentwood School. He studied medicine at London University. He was a member of the Hornchurch Harriers.

Davies started studying in 1953 and finished second behind Maurice Morrell in the javelin throw event at the 1954 AAA Championships.

At the 1956 AAA Championships, he finished third behind Peter Cullen. He completed his BSc in anatomy in 1956.

He was selected for the England athletics team in the javelin at the 1958 British Empire and Commonwealth Games in Cardiff, Wales.

In 1959 he finished his studies with a MB in surgery. In 1970, he became a consultant orthopaedic surgeon at Gloucestershire Royal Hospital and retired in 1998.
