= Athletics at the 1954 British Empire and Commonwealth Games – Men's 120 yards hurdles =

Men's 120 yards hurdles at the Commonwealth Games
- Venue: Empire Stadium
- Dates: 6 August

The men's 120 yards hurdles event at the 1954 British Empire and Commonwealth Games was held on 6 August at the Empire Stadium in Vancouver, Canada.

== Medalists ==
Gold	Silver	Bronze
Keith Gardner; Jamaica	Chris Higham; England	Norman Williams; Canada

== Results ==
=== Heats ===
Qualification: First 3 in each heat (Q) qualify directly for the final.

Rank	Heat	Name	Nationality	Time	Notes
1	1	Ken Doubleday	Australia	14.5	Q
2	1	Chris Higham	England	14.7	Q
3	1	Norman Williams	Canada	14.9	Q
4	1	Bob Shaw	Wales	15.4	
	1	Louis Knight	Jamaica	DNF	
1	2	Keith Gardner	Jamaica	14.7	Q
2	2	Jack Parker	England	14.7	Q
3	2	David Lean	Australia	??.?	Q
4	2	Sarwan Bangham	India	15.5	
5	2	John McRoberts	Canada	15.9	
6	2	Korigo Barno	Kenya	16.3	

=== Final ===
Rank	Name	Nationality	Time	Notes
1st place, gold medalist(s)	Keith Gardner	Jamaica	14.2	GR
2nd place, silver medalist(s)	Chris Higham	England	14.9	
3rd place, bronze medalist(s)	Norman Williams	Canada	14.9	
4	Jack Parker	England	15.0	
5	David Lean	Australia	15.1	
	Ken Doubleday	Australia	DNF	
