= Dennis Tucker =

British athlete

Personal information
- Nationality: British (English)
- Born: 31 May 1928 (age 98) Lambeth, London, England

Sport
- Sport: Athletics
- Event: Javelin throw
- Club: Herne Hill Harriers

Dennis Edwin Tucker (31 May 1928), is a former javelin thrower who competed for England at the Commonwealth Games.

== Biography ==
Tucker was a junior champion of Surrey and studied modern languages at Jesus College, Oxford. He was a member of Herne Hill Harriers and broke the javelin throw club record in March 1950, throwing 187 feet.

After winning the javelin for Oxford at the 1950 annual varsity match he won the Herne Hill Harriers senior championships. He enjoyed a successful 1952, becoming only the sixth British athlete to throw over 200 feet and finishing third behind Michael Denley and Dick Miller at the 1952 AAA Championships, which meant that he only just missed out on Olympic selection for the 1952 Summer Olympics.

After Oxford, he took a teaching position at Caterham School and was selected to represent the English team at the 1954 British Empire and Commonwealth Games in Vancouver, Canada, where finished fourth in the javelin throw event.

At the 1955 AAA Championships he finished runner-up behind Romanian Dumitru Zamfir but by virtue of being the highest placed British athlete, he was declared British champion.
