= Fred Green (athlete) =

British athlete

Personal information
- Nationality: British (English)
- Born: 25 July 1926 Birmingham, England
- Died: 17 July 2006 (aged 79) Perth, Western Australia

Sport
- Sport: Athletics
- Event: long-distance
- Club: Birchfield Harriers
Medal record
Athletics
Representing England
British Empire & Commonwealth Games
Silver medal – second place	1954 Vancouver	3 miles

Frederick Green (25 July 1926–17 July 2006), was a male athlete who competed for England and 3 miles world record holder.

== Biography ==
Green finished second behind Gordon Pirie in the 3 miles event at the 1953 AAA Championships.

On 10 July 1954 Green defeated Christopher Chataway in the 1954 AAA Championships at White City Stadium and broke the three miles world record held by Gunder Hägg by recording 13 minutes 32.2 sec; Chataway's time was also under the world record.

Shortly afterwards, he represented England and won a silver medal in the 3 miles at the 1954 British Empire and Commonwealth Games in Vancouver, Canada.

Later that year Green was voted best champion of 1954 and duly retired from athletics to take up coaching.
