= Derek Cox (athlete) =

English shot putter

Personal information
- Nationality: British (English)
- Born: 24 July 1931 West Ham, East London, England
- Died: 7 August 2008 (aged 77)

Sport
- Sport: Athletics
- Events: shot put, long jump, high jump
- Club: Eton Manor A.C.

Derek Richard John Cox (24 July 1931 – 7 August 2008) was a male athlete who competed for England.

== Biography ==
Cox became the British high jump champion after winning the British AAA Championships title at the 1953 AAA Championships.

He represented the English team at the 1954 British Empire and Commonwealth Games held in Vancouver, Canada, where he finished in fourth place in the long jump event.
