= Ian Boyd (athlete) =

British middle-distance runner

Personal information
- Nationality: British (English)
- Born: 8 December 1933 (age 92) Epsom, England
- Height: 174 cm (5 ft 9 in)
- Weight: 58 kg (128 lb)

Sport
- Sport: Athletics
- Event: Middle-distance running
- Club: Herne Hill Harriers
Medal record
Athletics
Representing England
British Empire & Commonwealth Games
Bronze medal – third place	1954 Vancouver	880 yards

Ian Hugh Boyd (born 8 December 1933) is a British middle-distance runner who competed at the 1956 Summer Olympics.

== Biography ==
Boyd finished second behind Roger Bannister in the 1 mile event at the 1954 AAA Championships. Shortly afterwards he represented England and won a bronze medal in the 880 yards race at the 1954 British Empire and Commonwealth Games in Vancouver, Canada.

After finishing third at the 1956 AAA Championships, he competed in the men's 1500 metres at the 1956 Olympic Games in Melbourne.

Boyd was awarded the best senior athlete of the year for 1957 by his club, the Herne Hill Harriers.

Two years later he represented the England athletics team in the 1 mile race at the 1958 British Empire and Commonwealth Games in Cardiff, Wales.
