= Lawrence Ogwang =

Ugandan athlete

Personal information
- Full name: Lawrence Ogwang
- Nationality: Ugandan
- Born: 17 December 1932 Uganda
- Died: 1970s

Sport
- Country: Uganda
- Sport: Athletics
- Event(s): Long and Triple Jump

Achievements and titles
- Personal best(s): 7.36 m (24 ft 2 in) - Long Jump; 15.64 m (51 ft 4 in) - Triple Jump

Lawrence Ogwang (17 December 1932 – 1970s) was a Ugandan long and triple jumper. He was the brother of the Olympic athlete John Akii-Bua and was murdered during the reign of Idi Amin.

== Career ==
He won a gold medal in the long jump at the 1953 Central African Games. Ogwang competed internationally at the 1954 British Empire and Commonwealth Games in Vancouver, British Columbia, Canada where he finished in sixth place in the triple jump with a jump of 14.13 m (46 ft 4 1/2 in) and was eliminated in the heats of 4×110 yards relay (with Ben Nduga, John Agoro and Yekoyasi Kasango).
