= Kevin Flanagan =

Northern Irish athlete

Personal information
- Nationality: British (Northern Irish)
- Born: c.1933

Sport
- Sport: Athletics
- Event(s): Javelin throw, Shot put
- Club: Albert Foundry AC; Royal Ulster Constabulary

Kevin Edward Flanagan (born c.1933) is a former athlete from Northern Ireland, who represented Northern Ireland at the British Empire Games (now Commonwealth Games).

== Biography ==
Flanagan attended St Mary's Christian Brothers' Grammar School, Belfast and St Mary's University College, Belfast.

He was a member of the Albert Foundry Athletics Club and the athletics club of the Royal Ulster Constabulary. He was a RUC policeman in Belfast and represented Great Britain at international level.

He represented the 1954 Northern Irish Team at the 1954 British Empire and Commonwealth Games in Vancouver, Canada, participating in the javelin throw and shot put events. He reached the final of the javelin throw and finished seventh.

After the games, the Northern Ireland team were given a civic reception by the Lord and Mayor and Lady Mayoress at the Belfast City Hall but Flanagan missed the reception because he was competing in the World Police Championships in Sweden.
