= Eamonn Kinsella =

Irish hurdler

Personal information
- Nationality: Irish
- Born: 8 October 1932 Carlow, Ireland
- Died: 8 August 1991 (aged 58) Dublin, Ireland
- Height: 195 cm (6 ft 5 in)
- Weight: 83 kg (183 lb)

Sport
- Sport: Athletics
- Event: hurdles
- Club: Donore Harriers, Dublin

Eamonn Edward Francis Kinsella (8 October 1932 – 8 August 1991), was an Irish track and field athlete who specialised in the hurdles and competed at the 1956 Summer Olympics.

== Biography ==
Kinsella was born in Carlow, Ireland and became a member of the Donore Harriers of Dublin.

Kinsella finished third behind Jack Parker in the 12o yards hurdles event at the British 1954 AAA Championships and second behind Peter Hildreth at the 1956 AAA Championships.

Later that year he represented Ireland at the 1956 Olympic Games in Melbourne, competing in the 110 metres hurdles event in the 1956 Melbourne Olympics, failing to progress beyond the heats.

In 1957, Kinsella gained revenge on Peter Hildreth by winning the British AAA Championships title at the 1957 AAA Championships.
