= Dave Wilson (high jumper) =

British athlete

Personal information
- Nationality: British (English)
- Born: 8 April 1938 (age 87) London, England

Sport
- Sport: Athletics
- Event: high jump
- Club: Hercules AC

Dave Wilson is a male former athlete who competed for England.

== Biography ==
Wilson finished second behind Oladipo Okuwobi in the high jump event at the 1957 AAA Championships and by virtue of being the highest placed British athlete was considered the British high jump champion.

He represented the England athletics team in the high jump at the 1958 British Empire and Commonwealth Games in Cardiff, Wales.
