= Mike Agostini =

Trinidad and Tobago sprinter (1935–2016)

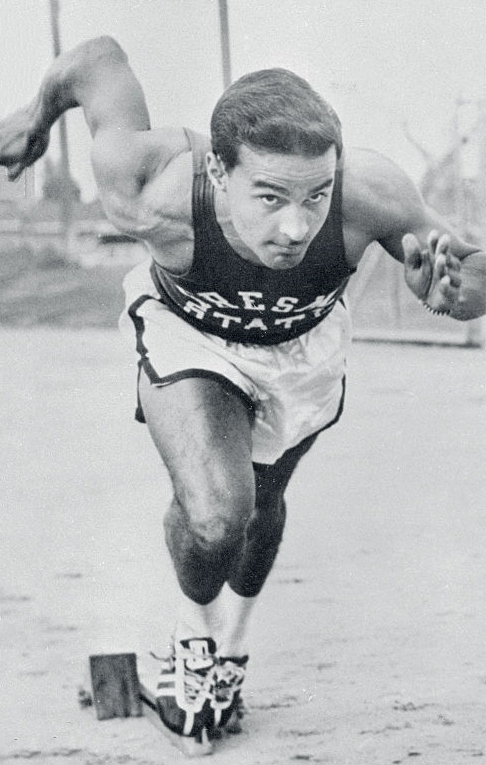
- Agostini in 1956

Personal information
- Full name: Michael George Raymond Agostini
- Born: 23 January 1935 Port-of-Spain, Trinidad and Tobago
- Died: 12 May 2016 (aged 81) Sydney, Australia
- Height: 171 cm (5 ft 7 in)
- Weight: 66 kg (146 lb)

Sport
- Country: Trinidad and Tobago
- Sport: Athletics
- Event: Sprint
- Club: Villanova Wildcats

Achievements and titles
- Personal bests: 100 m – 10.2 (1958); 200 m – 20.5 (1956)
Medal record
Representing Trinidad and Tobago
Commonwealth Games
Gold medal – first place	1954 Vancouver	100 yd
Bronze medal – third place	1958 Cardiff	100 yd
Pan American Games
Silver medal – second place	1955 Mexico City	100 m
Bronze medal – third place	1955 Mexico City	200 m
Representing British West Indies
Pan American Games
Silver medal – second place	1959 Chicago	100 m
Bronze medal – third place	1959 Chicago	200 m
Bronze medal – third place	1959 Chicago	4×100 m

Michael George Raymond Agostini (23 January 1935 – 12 May 2016) was a Trinidadian track and field athlete. He was the first athlete from his country to win a gold medal at what is now known as the Commonwealth Games, when he won the 100 yards final in Vancouver, British Columbia, Canada, on 31 July 1954.

== Early life ==
Michael Agostini was born on 23 January 1935 at Port-of-Spain, Trinidad. He was of Corsican, according to other sources of Portuguese and Italian descent. His family had interests in sports: his father played football, his mother played hockey, and all his siblings participated in football and athletics events at St. Mary's College, where they studied.

== Athletics career ==
Agostini participated in athletics, football, and boxing in his school days. In 1952, at Kingston, he defeated Jamaican sprinter Herb McKenley, who had won one gold and two silver medals at the 1952 Helsinki Olympics. On a scholarship, Agostini enrolled at Villanova University, where he received training from Jumbo Elliott. On 23 January 1954, his 19th birthday, he set a world indoor record for over 100 yards at Washington, beating Olympic champion Lindy Remigino. The same year, he competed in the 1954 Commonwealth Games at Vancouver, Canada, and won gold in the 100 yards race (9.6). He defeated Canadian Don McFarlane (9.7) and Australian Hec Hogan (9.7), becoming the first athlete from Trinidad and Tobago to win gold at the Commonwealth Games. Hogan was then in the news for tying the world records of 100 yards (9.3) and 100 m (10.2) and was the most anticipated winner. Reports suggest that Hogan's performance was hampered after he was informed that Agostini had ironically stated in a pre-Games interview, "Who the heck is Hogan?" when questioned about him.

In 1955 Agostini participated in the Pan American Games held in Mexico and won a silver and a bronze in the 100 m and 200 m races, respectively. He also won silver at the 1959 Chicago Pan American Games in the 100 m, a bronze in the 200 m, and another bronze in the 4 × 100 m relay.

Agostini was an All American sprinter for the Fresno State Bulldogs track and field team, finishing 3rd in the 100 m at the 1956 NCAA track and field championships.

In the next Commonwealth Games at Cardiff in 1958, he stood third in the 100 yards run behind Keith Gardner of Jamaica and Tom Robinson of Bahamas. Agostini won another gold in the 1959 British West Indies Championships in the 100 m and a bronze in the 200 m.

Agostini had also represented Trinidad and Tobago at the Men's 100 m and Men's 200 m at the 1956 Summer Olympics, ranking 6th and 4th, respectively.

== Post-retirement ==
Agostini retired from active sports in the late 1950s. He graduated with a degree in economics from Fresno State University, California, in 1958. In the late 1950s Agostini moved to Australia and married Pamela, with whom he had two daughters and two sons. He received Australian citizenship in 1961. He coached various sprinters, including Ralph Doubell, Andrew Ratcliffe, Peter Vassella, and Jenny Lamy. He worked as a freelance journalist and as a teacher for a brief time, and also served as editor and publisher for Track and Field magazine in the mid-1960s. He edited numerous periodicals and authored nine books. In 2007, Mike Agostini was inducted into the Fresno County Athletic Hall of Fame. In his later years, he suffered from arthritis and pancreatic cancer. He died on 12 May 2016 of cancer in Sydney.
