= Eddie Kirkup =

British athlete

Personal information
- Nationality: British (English)
- Born: 27 July 1929 Wakefield, England
- Died: 1 June 2008 (aged 78) Rotherham, England

Sport
- Sport: Athletics
- Event: Long-distance
- Club: Rotherham Harriers

Ernest Kirkup (27 July 1929 – 1 June 2008) was an English athlete.

== Biography ==
Kirkup was a member of the Rotherham Harriers and became the British marathon champion when winning the 1957 AAA Championships in Watford.

Kirkup represented the England athletics team in the marathon at the 1958 British Empire and Commonwealth Games in Cardiff, Wales.

He died in Rotherham on 5 January 2008, at the age of 78.
