= Titus Erinle =

Nigerian sprinter

Personal information
- Nationality: Nigerian
- Born: 23 June 1927 Ado Ekiti, Nigeria
- Died: 21 October 1993 Lagos, Nigeria
- Height: 175 cm (5 ft 9 in)
- Weight: 64 kg (141 lb)

Sport
- Sport: Sprinting
- Event: 100 metres
- Club: Loughborough University

Titus Abimbola Erinle (23 June 1927–21 october 1993) was a Nigerian sprinter who competed at the 1952 Summer Olympics and 1956 Summer Olympics.

== Biography ==
Erinle represented the Nigeria at the 1952 Olympic Games in Helsinki, where he participated in the 100 metres and 4 x 100 metres relay events.

In 1954, he represented Nigeria at the 1954 British Empire and Commonwealth Games in Vancouver, Canada, where he was eliminated in the heats.

Erinle finished second behind John Young in the 100 yards event at the British 1956 AAA Championships. Later that year he represented Nigeria again at the 1956 Olympic Games in Melbourne.

== Competition record ==
Year	Competition	Venue	Position	Event	Notes
Representing Nigeria
1952	Olympics	Helsinki, Finland	3rd, Heat 10	100 m	11.12/10.9
Representing Nigeria
1956	Olympics	Melbourne, Australia	3rd, Heat 3	100 m	11.09
