= Clive Roberts (cricketer) =

English cricketer and soldier

Personal information
- Full name: Clive Lionel Chatfield Roberts
- Born: 2 February 1912; Kensington, London, England
- Died: 30 April 1962 (aged 50); Charlton Kings, Gloucestershire, England
- Batting: Unknown

Domestic team information
- Years: Team
- 1936/37–1937/38: Europeans

Career statistics
Competition	First-class
Matches	2
Runs scored	80
Batting average	20.00
100s/50s	–/–
Top score	37
Catches/stumpings	–/–
- Source: Cricinfo, 25 December 2023

Clive Lionel Chatfield Roberts MBE (2 February 1912 – 30 April 1962) was an English first-class cricketer and an officer in the British Army.

The son of William Lionel Lloyd Robert, he was born at Kensington in February 1912. He was educated at Cheltenham College, where he played for the college cricket eleven. From there, entered into the Territorial Army with the 3rd City of London Regiment, and was commissioned into the British Army as a second lieutenant with the Gloucestershire Regiment in February 1935. While serving in British India, he made two appearances in first-class cricket for the Europeans cricket team against the Indians in the 1936–37 and 1937–38 Madras Presidency Matches. In these, he scored 80 runs with a highest score of 37.

In the military, he was promoted to lieutenant in February 1938. Roberts served with the regiment in the Second World War, seeing action in the British defeat in Burma in 1942–43. In recognition of his gallant and distinguished service during the Japanese invasion, he was made an MBE in October 1942. In January 1943, he was promoted to captain, Following the end of the war, he was mentioned in dispatches in April 1946 for his service during the campaign to liberate North-West Europe in 1944–45. He was promoted to major in February 1948, prior to his retirement as a lieutenant colonel in January 1958. Roberts died in April 1962 at Charlton Kings, Gloucestershire.
