= Joe McGhee =

Scottish marathon runner

Joseph McGhee
Personal information
- Nationality: British (Scottish)
- Born: 9 July 1929 Falkirk, Scotland
- Died: 17 April 2015 (aged 85)

Sport
- Sport: Athletics
- Event: Marathon
- Club: Shettleston Harriers
Medal record
Representing Scotland
Gold medal – first place	1954 Vancouver	Marathon

Joseph McGhee (9 July 1929 – 17 April 2015) was a Scottish marathon runner, who won a gold medal at the 1954 British Empire and Commonwealth Games in Vancouver, Canada.

== Career ==
McGhee was a member of Shettleston Harriers athletics club, and also the Glasgow University Hares and Hounds.

McGhee won the marathon event at the 1954 British Empire and Commonwealth Games in Vancouver, Canada. The event was run in sublime heat, and Englishman Jim Peters had been leading the race by 17 minutes coming into the stadium, but collapsed. Only six runners finished the race, out of 16 starters. McGhee had been the only Scot in the race, and his victory was overshadowed in the press by coverage of Peters' collapse. McGhee won the 1954, 1955 and 1956 Scottish National Championships, making him the first Scotsman to win three successive marathon championships. Fraser Clyne later achieved the same feat in 1992–94.

== Personal life ==
McGhee attended St Francis' RC Primary school, and St Modan's High School in Stirling. He later studied at the University of Glasgow from 1946 until 1951. McGhee later became a flight lieutenant in the RAF. McGhee also worked as a teacher, during which time he taught Mike Ryan. Ryan later said he thought of McGhee as he won his bronze medal at the 1968 Summer Olympics in Mexico City. McGhee wrote an autobiography entitled The Forgotten Winner, which has now been published.

He married in 1960, and has five children, six grandchildren and four great grandchildren.
