= Peter Esiri =

Nigerian triple jumper (born 1928)

Personal information
- Nationality: Nigerian
- Born: 11 September 1928

Sport
- Sport: Athletics
- Event: triple jump
Medal record
Representing Nigeria
British Empire and Commonwealth Games
Silver medal – second place	1954 Vancouver	Triple jump

Peter Esiri (born 11 September 1928) is a Nigerian former athlete. He represented Nigeria in the triple jump event at the 1956 Olympics held in Melbourne.

== Biography ==
Esiri finished third behind Ken Wilmshurst in the triple jump event at the 1954 AAA Championships.

Shortly afterwards, Esiri represented Nigeria at the 1954 British Empire and Commonwealth Games in Vancouver and won a silver medal in the triple jump competition, beaten again by Ken Wilmshurst who claimed the gold.

Esiri represented Nigeria at the 1956 Olympic Games in Melbourne, where he qualified for the final round with a jump of 14.93 in the event but overstepped the board in his final attempts.
