= Clive Roberts (javelin thrower) =

Welsh athlete

Personal information
- Nationality: British (Welsh)

Sport
- Sport: Athletics
- Event: Javelin throw
- Club: Swansea AC

John Clive Roberts is a former Welsh athlete who specialised in the javelin throw and appeared at the Commonwealth Games.

== Biography ==
Roberts attended Swansea Grammar School and set a new javelin record of 158 ft 9in at the 1951 Welsh AAA Youth Championships. He was a member of the Swansea Athletics Club.

In May 1956, after competing in the Maindy Stadium meeting he was duly selected for the Welsh athletics team for the 1954 British Empire and Commonwealth Games, where he participated in the javelin throw event.

Roberts threw over 202 feet in 1958.
