= Chris Higham =

British

Personal information
- Nationality: British (English)
- Born: 1930 Richmond, Surrey, England
- Died: 2020 (aged 89) Hampshire, England

Sport
- Sport: Athletics
- Event: Hurdles
- Club: Achilles Club
Medal record
Athletics
Representing England
British Empire & Commonwealth Games
Silver medal – second place	1954 Vancouver	120y hurdles

Christopher Eric Edward Higham (1930–2020) was an English athlete who competed at the Commonwealth Games.

== Biography ==
Higham represented the English team at the 1954 British Empire and Commonwealth Games held in Vancouver, Canada, where he won the silver medal in the 120 yards hurdles event.

Higham died in Hampshire in 2020, at the age of 89.
