= Don Jowett =

New Zealand sprinter and rugby union player

Don Jowett OAM
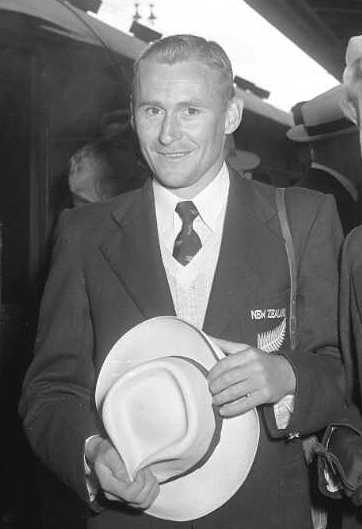
- Jowett in 1954

Personal information
- Born: 4 March 1931
- Died: 21 July 2011 (aged 80)
- Relative: Sue Jowett (daughter)

Sport
- Country: New Zealand
- Sport: Track and field
- Event: Sprint

Achievements and titles
- National finals: 220 yards champion (1952, 1953, 1954); 440 yards champion (1953, 1954, 1955, 1957)
- Personal bests: 200 m – 21.1 (1954); 400 m – 47.1 (1954)
Medal record
Representing New Zealand
British Empire and Commonwealth Games
| Gold medal – first place | 1954 Vancouver | 220 yards |
| Silver medal – second place | 1954 Vancouver | 440 yards |
| Bronze medal – third place | 1950 Auckland | 220 yards |

Donald Winston Jowett OAM (4 March 1931 – 21 July 2011) was a New Zealand sprinter and rugby union player who represented his country at the 1950 and 1954 British Empire and Commonwealth Games, winning a bronze medal in 1950, and gold and silver medals in 1954.

Jowett won seven New Zealand national athletics titles: the 220 yards in 1952, 1953, and 1954; and the 440 yards in 1953, 1954, 1955, and 1957. He also won five national titles at under-19 level: the 440 yards in 1945, 1946, and 1947; and the 880 yards in 1946 and 1947.

Besides athletics, Jowett played rugby for Otago in 1957. He later moved to Queensland where he was involved in rugby and athletics administration, coaching and refereeing. In the 2005 Australia Day Honours, Jowett was awarded the Order of Australia Medal for service to sport, particularly athletics, as an administrator, technical official and coach, and to the community through church and welfare organisations. His daughter Sue Jowett became an Olympic sprinter.

Don Jowett died on 21 July 2011.
