= Paul Engo =

Cameroonian athlete and jurist

Personal information
- Nationality: Nigerian
- Born: 5 October 1931 Ebolowa, Cameroon
- Died: 26 April 2010 (aged 78) Yaoundé, Cameroon

Sport
- Sport: Athletics
- Event: triple jump
- Club: London Athletic Club

Paul Bamela Engo (21 October 1931 – 26 April 2010) was a Cameroonian diplomat, judge and triple jumper who represented Nigeria at the 1956 Summer Olympics in Melbourne.

== Biography ==
Engo was born in Ebolowa, Cameroon to the family of Fredrick Engo Mimbe and Elizabeth Ekoto Nku’u. His mother died when he was six and the family moved to Warri, Nigeria where his father worked. Engo attended Edo College, Benin.

He studied law at the Middle Temple in London and was affiliated with the London Athletic Club prior to the Olympics. Esiri finished second behind Ken Wilmshurst in the triple jump event at the 1954 AAA Championships and second behind Wilmshurst at the 1955 AAA Championships.

At the 1956 Olympic Games in Melbourne, Engo qualified for the final round and improved on his previous attempts with a final round leap of 15.03m.

Engo also finished ninth in the 1958 British Empire and Commonwealth Games triple jump. After he finished studies in U.K. and qualified as a lawyer, he started work at the Federal Ministry of Justice, Lagos. Later he returned to Cameroon where he joined the foreign service and rose to the position of the Ambassador to the United Nations in New York.

He was also a justice of the International Tribunal for the Law of the Sea.
