= Edward Ajado =

Nigerian sprinter (1929–1980)

Personal information
- Nationality: Nigerian
- Born: 1 March 1929 Abeokuta, British Nigeria
- Died: 26 December 1980 (aged 51) Lagos, Nigeria

Sport
- Sport: Sprinting
- Event: 100 metres
Medal record
Men's athletics
Representing Nigeria
British Empire and Commonwealth Games
Silver medal – second place	1954 Vancouver	4 × 110 yards relay

Edward Alabi Ajado (1 March 1929 – 26 December 1980) was a Nigerian sprinter. He competed in the 100 metres and 200 metres at the 1952 Summer Olympics and in the 100 metres and 4 × 100 metres at the 1956 Summer Olympics. At the 1954 British Empire and Commonwealth Games, Ajado won a silver medal in the 4 × 110 yards relay (with Muslim Arogundade, Abdul Karim Amu, and Karim Olowu) and finished fourth in the 100 yards.
