= Ken Jones (rugby union, born 1921) =

British Lions & Wales international rugby union footballer & sprinter (1921-2006)

Ken Jones OBE
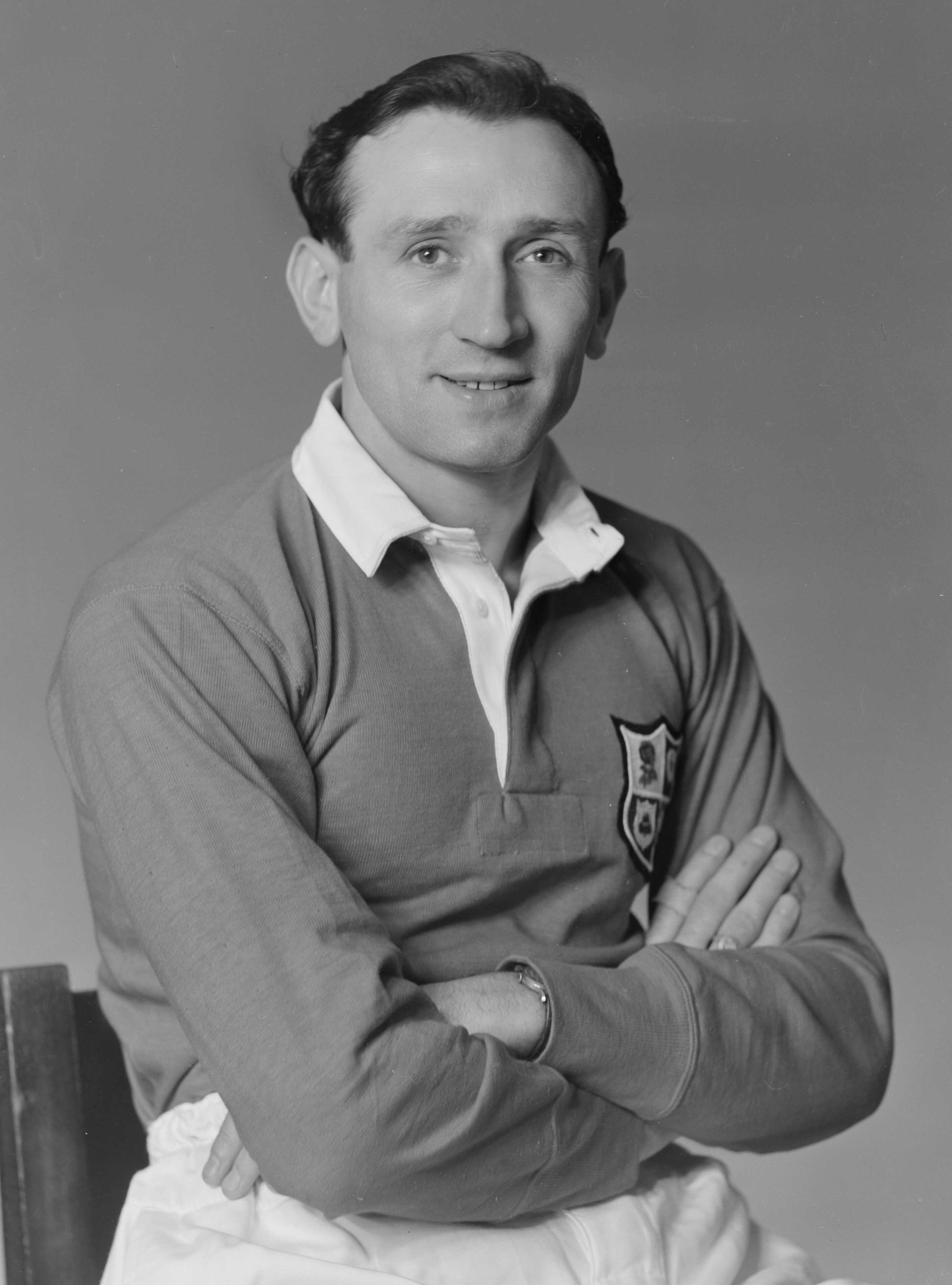
- Jones in 1950

Personal information
- Born: Kenneth Jeffrey Jones; 30 December 1921 Blaenavon, Wales
- Died: 18 April 2006 (aged 84) Newport, Wales
- Education: West Monmouth Grammar School; St. Paul's Training College, Cheltenham; Loughborough College
- Occupation: Teacher
- Height: 5 ft 11 in (1.80 m)
- Weight: 12 st 4 lb (172 lb; 78 kg)

Sport
- Sport: Athletics
- Events: Sprint, long jump
- Club: Newport Athletic Club

Achievements and titles
- Personal best: 100 m – 10.6 (1948)
Medal record
Men's athletics
Representing Great Britain
Olympic Games
| Silver medal – second place | 1948 London | 4×100 m |
European Championships
| Silver medal – second place | 1954 Bern | 4×100 m |
Representing Wales
British Empire and Commonwealth Games
| Bronze medal – third place | Vancouver 1954 | 220 yd |

Rugby union career
- Position: Wing
Senior career
| Years | Team | Apps | (Points) |
- Talywain
| 1945–46 | Blaenavon | | |
| 1945–46 | Pontypool | | |
| 1946–58 | Newport | 294 | (443) |
| 1948–49 | Leicester | 1 | (0) |
International career
| Years | Team | Apps | (Points) |
| 1947–57 | Wales | 44 | (51) |
| 1949–56 | Barbarians | 5 | (12) |
| 1950 | British Lions | 3 | (6) |

Kenneth Jeffrey Jones OBE (30 December 1921 – 18 April 2006) was a Welsh sprinter and record breaking Welsh international rugby union footballer. He played for both Wales and the British Isles. He is best known in Wales for his contribution to Welsh rugby, but most notably for his winning try against the All Blacks in 1953.

== Early life ==
Jones was born in Blaenavon, Monmouthshire on 30 December 1921 and as a youth attended West Monmouth Grammar School in Pontypool. There, under the guidance of Gilbert Garnett, he nurtured a skill in rugby union, representing his school and during the holidays he would play for Talywain. During the 1939–40 season, he was selected for the Welsh Secondary School XV, his first Welsh cap and later that year he attended St. Paul's Training College in Cheltenham. Jones served his country towards the end of World War II and was stationed in India with the Royal Air Force. It was while on service that Jones developed his sprinting.

== Track and field career ==
Jones was well known as a sprinter. Before he competed at the 1948 Summer Olympics he was already Welsh and Amateur Athletic Association champion and won the silver medal at the 1948 Olympics in the 4×100 metres relay, together with teammates Jack Archer, John Gregory and Alastair McCorquodale. In 1954 he ran in the British Empire and Commonwealth Games in Vancouver and won a bronze medal in the 220 yard sprint. In the same year was given the honour of captaining the British team in the European Championships in Bern. It was at these championships that Jones was again part of a 100-metre relay, silver medal team. On this occasion the team comprised Jones, George Ellis, Kenneth Box and Brian Shenton, losing in the final to Hungary.

== Club rugby ==
After returning from the war, Jones looked for rugby clubs to join. During the end of the 1945–46 season Jones managed to play a few games for both Blaenavon and Pontypool, and when the 1946–47 season opened he applied for a trial for Newport at Rodney Parade and managed to get a place in the first XV. Jones spent the rest of his career with Newport, playing just one game for the Leicester Tigers during the 1948–49 season. Jones captained Newport over two seasons in 1950–51 and 1953–54. His captaincy during the 1950–51 season was particularly memorable when Newport won the Welsh Club Championship for the first time since 1922–23.

== Welsh international rugby career ==
=== 1947–1950 ===
Jones was first capped for his country in an international game against England on 18 January 1947 under the captaincy of Haydn Tanner. The match was the first international for both countries since the start of the war, and unsurprisingly both sides were filled with new caps. Tanner and Howard Davies were the only players from Wales with any experience at this level, though Jones did have the benefit of starting with two of his Newport teammates, Reg Blackmore and George Parsons. Wales lost the game and although Blackmore and Parsons wouldn't represent their country again, Jones would play in all three remaining games of the championship. In the next game against Scotland, Jones repaid the selector's belief in him when he scored two tries. Wales ran out 22–8 winners, the highest scoring victory against Scotland since 1911.

1949 was a poor year for Wales, and in that year's Championship, although scoring a try in the final game against France, Jones let his opposite wing in for the decisive score. That try relegated Wales to last place in the league and gave them the wooden spoon. The next season saw an incredible turn-around in Welsh fortunes which made Jones's world-class reputation. In the opening game of the Championship, Wales achieved a rare victory over England at Twickenham and in the next game against Scotland, Jones scored a try in another win. On 11 March at Ravenhill, Belfast Jones was again on the score sheet as Wales beat Ireland to win their eighth Triple Crown. Though celebrations were short lived when a day later, a plane carrying jubilant supporters back to Wales crashed at Llandow, killing eighty. It was therefore a somber occasion when Wales faced France on 25 March at the Cardiff Arms Park. The match itself was a walkover for Wales, with Jones scoring two of the four tries in a 21–0 score line. This was the first time Wales had won the Grand Slam since 1911.

=== 1951–1953 ===
Much was expected of the Welsh team in the 1951 season after the Grand Slam had been taken the year before, but the resulting championship was made up of mixed performances. Jones scored a try in an emphatic win against England in January, but found himself on the losing team when an unfancied Scotland beat Wales 19–0 at Murrayfield. After a draw against Ireland, Jones scored with a try against France in the last game of the season, but these was the only Welsh points in an 8–3 loss.

The next season saw a resurgent Wales, in which Jones scored against all three home nation teams. The opening game with England turned out to be the championship decider. While Lewis Jones was off the pitch receiving treatment for an injury, England took the numerical advantage scoring two tries through Albert Agar and Ted Woodward. In the second half the Welsh forwards dominated, especially in the line out, and in the resulting pressure Jones scored two tries, one converted by Malcolm Thomas, which gave Wales victory. The matches against Ireland and Scotland were won without Wales hitting their best form, and the final match against France was won despite the poor Welsh kicking. Jones had now collected his second Grand Slam trophy with Wales, and had played 25 consecutive games for his country.

The 1953 Five Nations Championship saw another good Welsh run, losing only to eventual champions England. Jones was again picked for all four games, but only managed a single try against Scotland. 1953 also saw the arrival in Wales of the touring New Zealand team. On 19 December, Wales and the All Blacks met at the Cardiff Arms Park with the New Zealand team so far unbeaten in the tour. Welsh hopes were raised after two New Zealand draws against Swansea and Ulster, and Wales were favourites to win the contest. The game did not start as was expected, and Wales were chasing the game after New Zealand took an early lead. In the last twenty minutes Wales appeared to raise their game and started playing offensive rugby. Gareth Griffiths returned to the field despite dislocating his shoulder and Clem Thomas moved back into the pack and the Welsh play became more focused. Gwyn Rowlands kicked a penalty to bring the scores level and with five minutes to go Clem Thomas made a dash down the left hand touchline. With his path cut off by the All Black defense, Thomas cross-kicked the ball for Jones to take it on the bounce. Jones rounded Ron Jarden on the inside and scored his most memorable and final try of his Welsh career. With Rowlands converting the score Wales had beaten New Zealand 13–8.

=== 1954–1957 ===
Jones was again one of the first-choice players in the 1954 Welsh squad, and in a repeat of the previous season Wales lost their opening fixture to England. A last minute try from Chris Winn gave England the victory, but not the Championship after Wales won the final three games of the tournament to lift the Five Nations trophy. Jones played in all four matches, but finished the campaign without a single score to his name, though he did receive the honour of captaining his country for his only time in the game against Scotland. The 1955 Five Nations Championship started on a more positive note for both Wales and Jones; Wales beat England in the opening game while Jones became Wales's most-capped player in the same match, playing in his 36th appearance. Although Wales lost the next fixture against Scotland, they would beat Ireland and France to win the tournament for the fourth time in the last six years. Jones again played in all four games, taking him to 39 caps.

The 1956 Championship was a very tight competition with most matches decided by one or two scores. Wales, under the captaincy of Cliff Morgan, played excellent rugby, deserving of the title. Wales took the Championship title again, but on this occasion losing to Ireland to prevent a Welsh Grand Slam and Triple Crown. Jones again played all four games, and again failed to score a try in any of them, though in the last match of the campaign against France on 24 March, Jones won his 43rd cap. This made him the most-capped player in world rugby, beating the record held by Ireland's George Stephenson. The next season, in the opening game against England, Wales ran out for the first time since rugby resumed in 1947 without Ken Jones. Jones was dropped by the selectors breaking his consecutive run of 43 matches. The next match, in a Welsh loss against Scotland, Jones played his very last international game for Wales. Jones was once quoted as saying, 'People ask me often which match I enjoyed most, the truth is I enjoyed them all. It was a marvellous experience playing for Wales.'

=== International matches played for Wales ===
Wales

- Australia 1947
- England 1947, 1948, 1949, 1950, 1951, 1952, 1953, 1954, 1955, 1956
- France 1947, 1948, 1949, 1950, 1951, 1952, 1953, 1954, 1955, 1956
- Ireland 1947, 1948, 1949, 1950, 1951, 1952, 1953, 1954, 1955, 1956
- New Zealand 1953
- Scotland 1947, 1948, 1949, 1950, 1951, 1952, 1953, 1954, 1955, 1956, 1957
- South Africa 1951

== British Lions ==
Throughout his career, Jones suffered a lack of scoring opportunities, at club and international level. Even when alongside the likes of Welsh midfield star players such as Bleddyn Williams and Cliff Morgan, Jones scored very few tries for a wing of his class. This would change when Jones was selected to play in the 1950 tour of Australia and New Zealand. Selected for 17 of the games, including three of the four tests against New Zealand, Jones scored 17 tries and was chosen as one of the five Players of the Year for the tour.

Jones's greatest moment in the tour came in the Fourth Test against New Zealand. In this match Jones found himself playing against an equally fast track sprinter in the All Black's Peter Henderson. During the test, Jones found himself outside fellow Welsh international Lewis Jones, following a break from the Lions' 25 yard line. Henderson was running between the two Joneses, but with Bob Scott closing in on Lewis Jones, he threw a pass over Henderson's head which Ken Jones collected the ball skillfully at shoulder level. With 50 yards to the try line, and with four All Blacks giving chase, Jones showed his Olympic sprinting finesse to just keep ahead of his opponents to score a magnificent try. Unfortunately for Jones, although he scored one of the tries of his career, he found himself on the losing side. A fact made worse when in the last minute, with the Lions 11–8 down, Jones chased a kick head and looked to score a certain winning try when the ball turned away from him on the bounce, and the chance was lost.

=== International matches played for the British Lions ===
- New Zealand 1950, 1950, 1950

== Later life and awards ==
Jones was a high school teacher for most of his life. From 1948 to 1985, he was also a sports reporter for Welsh newspaper, the Sunday Express, dealing mainly with rugby and athletics.

In the 1960 Queen's Birthday Honours he was appointed an Officer of the Order of the British Empire (OBE), "For services to Welsh Rugby Football".

Jones has also been honoured by the sporting and journalist communities. In 1954 he was the inaugural winner of the BBC Wales Sports Personality of the Year and was also chosen as the first rugby union inductee into the Welsh Sports Hall of Fame in 1990, ahead of more well known players such as Gareth Edwards or J. P. R. Williams.

In his late years Jones served as a board member and president of the Newport rugby club, resigning in 1995 in protest of the introduction of professionalism to rugby. After a stroke, he used a wheelchair. He died in 2006, at the age of 84.

== Competition record ==
| Year | Competition | Venue | Position | Event | Notes |
Representing Great Britain
| 1948 | Olympics | London, England | 6th, SF 2 | 100 m | |

== Bibliography ==
- Godwin, Terry (1984). The International Rugby Championship 1883–1983. London: Willow Books. ISBN 0-00-218060-X.
- Smith, David; Williams, Gareth (1980). Fields of Praise: The Official History of The Welsh Rugby Union. Cardiff: University of Wales Press. ISBN 0-7083-0766-3.
- Thomas, Wayne (1979). A Century of Welsh Rugby Players. Ansells.
