= Peter Cullen (athlete) =

British javelin thrower (1932–2010)

Personal information
- Nationality: British (English)
- Born: 24 August 1932 Lincoln, England
- Died: October 2010 (age 78) Loughborough, England
- Height: 188 cm (6 ft 2 in)
- Weight: 82 kg (181 lb)

Sport
- Sport: Athletics
- Event: Javelin throw
- Club: Loughborough College AC; Rotherham Harriers

Peter Sydney Cullen (24 August 1932 – October 2010) was a British athlete who competed at the 1956 Summer Olympics.

== Biography ==
Cullen was born in Lincoln, England but grew up in Yorkshire. In 1949 he was the English Schools long jump champion and the following year was English Schools high jump champion.

Cullen finished third behind Dumitru Zamfir in the javelin throw event at the 1955 AAA Championships and won a silver medal at the 1955 World Student Games.

Cullen became the British javelin throw champion after winning the British AAA Championships title at the 1956 AAA Championships. Later that year he represented Great Britain at the 1956 Olympic Games in Melbourne, where he participated in the men's javelin throw competition.

Cullen successfully retained his AAA title at the 1957 AAA Championships.

He was also selected for the England athletics team in the javelin at the 1958 British Empire and Commonwealth Games in Cardiff, Wales.

Cullen was an English and physical education teacher after his athletics career.
