= Eric Shirley =

British steeplechase athlete (born 1929)

Personal information
- Nationality: British (English)
- Born: 3 April 1929 (age 97) Epsom, England
- Height: 180 cm (5 ft 11 in)
- Weight: 70 kg (154 lb)

Sport
- Sport: Athletics
- Event: steeplechase
- Club: Finchley Harriers

Eric Shirley (born 3 April 1929) is a British former steeplechase athlete who competed at the 1956 Summer Olympics and 1960 Summer Olympics.

== Biography ==
Shirley finished third behind Ken Johnson in the 3,000 metres steeplechase event at the 1954 AAA Championships.

Shirley became the British 3,000 metres steeplechase champion after winning the British AAA Championships title at the 1956 AAA Championships. Later that year he ran the 3,000 metres steeplechase final at the 1956 Olympics Games in Melbourne, Australia for Great Britain, with team mates Chris Brasher and John Disley, coming in 8th with a time of 8.57. He also competed in the 1960 Olympics in Rome Italy.

Shirley was a member of Finchley Harriers and won a third AAA title at the 1960 AAA Championships. At the 1960 Olympic Games in Rome, he represented Great Britain for the second time in the steeplechase event.

By trade, Shirley was a property developer but also took administration roles in the sport of athletics.
