= Vic Matthews =

British hurdler and decathlete (1934–2026)

Personal information
- Nationality: British (English)
- Born: Victor Charles Matthews; 23 June 1934 Motspur Park, Surrey, England
- Died: 3 August 2026 (aged 92) Hamilton, New Zealand
- Height: 180 cm (5 ft 11 in)
- Weight: 76 kg (168 lb)

Sport
- Sport: Athletics
- Event: Decathlon/110 metres hurdles
- Club: London Athletic Club

Victor Charles Matthews (23 June 1934 – 3 August 2026) was a British hurdler and decathlete who competed at the 1960 Summer Olympics.

== Biography ==
As a teenager, Vic Matthews competed in both decathlons and hurdles. He was the Surrey junior 120 yards hurdles champion in 1952 and 1953. He was third in the senior AAA decathlon in 1953, behind Les Pinder at the 1953 AAA Championships.

Between 1955 and 1959, Matthews won seven senior Surrey hurdles titles at both 120 and 220 yards. In 1956 he won the AAA decathlon title after finishing second to the non-British national, Gerald Brown at the 1956 AAA Championships, but by virtue of being the highest placed 'local' athlete he was considered the British champion.

Matthews represented the England athletics team in the 120 yards hurdles at the 1958 British Empire and Commonwealth Games in Cardiff, Wales. He was eliminated in his 120 yards heat after finishing fourth. The following year he was the AAA 120 champion. At the 1960 Olympic Games in Rome, he represented Great Britain in the men's 110 metres hurdles. In the heats Matthews ran 14.9s and progressed to the quarter finals where he ran 15.0s.

Matthews emigrated to New Zealand in 1963, alongside his wife, Hilary, and his two sons, Roger and Paul. They settled in Hamilton, where he worked as a woodwork and metalwork teacher at St Paul's Collegiate School. He returned to the UK from 1975–1976 to attend Loughborough University, where he obtained an honours degree in Design Education and a diploma in wood and metal crafts. Following this, he returned to his teaching position in Hamilton. He later became a well-known New Zealand designer and manufacturer of quality furniture.

Matthews died in Hamilton on 3 August 2026, aged 92.
