= Brian Shenton =

English sprinter (1927–1987)

- Shenton in 1950 British running kit with his trainer

Personal information
- Nationality: British (English)
- Born: 15 March 1927 Doncaster, England
- Died: 9 May 1987 (aged 60)
- Height: 175 cm (5 ft 9 in)
- Weight: 70 kg (154 lb)

Sport
- Sport: Athletics
- Event: Sprints
- Club: Polytechnic Harriers; Doncaster AC
Medal record
Men's athletics
Representing Great Britain
European Championships
Gold medal – first place	1950 Brussels	200 m
Silver medal – second place	1954 Berne	4×100 m
Representing England
British Empire Games
Silver medal – second place	1950 Auckland	4×110 yd
British Empire and Commonwealth Games
Silver medal – second place	1954 Vancouver	220 yd

Brian Shenton (15 March 1927 – 9 May 1987) was a track and field sprinter. He represented Great Britain in the men's 200 metres and men's 4 × 100 metres relay at two consecutive Summer Olympics (1952 and 1956).

== Biography ==
Born in Doncaster from a working-class background, he was a member of the Doncaster Plant Works Athletic Club, later having a successful career in the city and reaching the position of Chairman of Noble Lowndes. He died in a car crash soon after retirement.

Shenton came to public attention in 1950 with a series of good performances, culminating in a place at the European Championships as a replacement. Described as the "boy from nowhere", he set a new personal best in the semi-finals of 21.6s, in the finals beating off the challenge of Étienne Bally.

He won the gold medal at the 1950 European Athletics Championships in Brussels, Belgium in the men's 200 metres in a time of 21.5s as part of the British team that first topped the medal table with a medal count that would not be matched for a further 40 years. Representing the England athletics team he won the silver medal at the 1950 British Empire Games in Auckland, New Zealand, in the 4 × 110 yard relay and represented the English team, winning an individual silver medal in the 220 yard dash at the 1954 British Empire and Commonwealth Games in Vancouver, British Columbia, Canada.

He won the silver medal at the 1954 European Athletics Championships in Berne, Switzerland in the men's 4 × 100 metres relay, alongside George Ellis, Kenneth Jones and Kenneth Box.

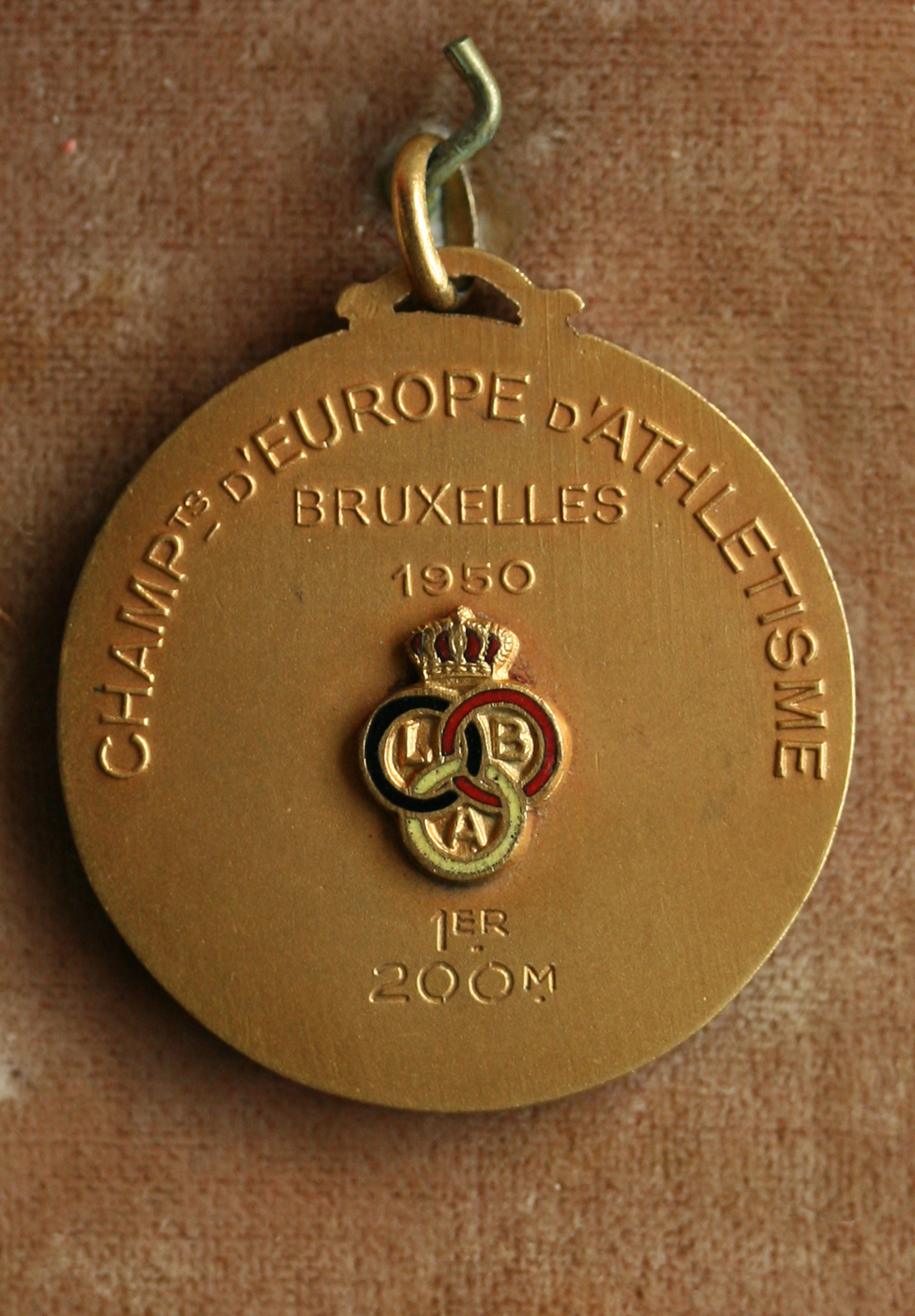
1950 European Athletics Championships Gold Medal 200 m

Shenton was the British 220 yards champion after winning the British AAA Championships title at the 1954 AAA Championships and the 1956 AAA Championships.

In 1957 Brian Shenton was timed as having set the English 100 yards native record in a time of 9.7 seconds. However, this was disallowed following a ruling that he had had a "flier". Shenton appealed and received a personal hearing at the AAA.

Memorabilia from Brian Shenton's athletic career was included in an exhibition of Doncaster's local Olympians in celebration of the London 2012 Olympics.
