= Brian Oliver (triple jumper) =

Australian triple jumper

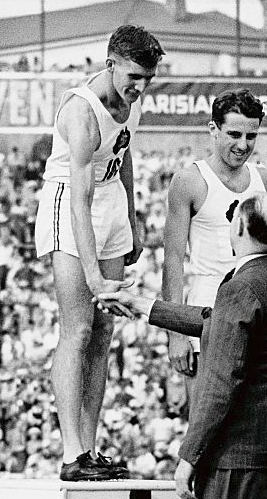
- Oliver (left) at the 1950 British Empire Games

Personal information
- Born: 26 September 1929 Northam, Western Australia
- Died: 20 October 2015 (aged 86) Perth, Western Australia
- Height: 186 cm (6 ft 1 in)
- Weight: 74 kg (163 lb)

Sport
- Sport: Athletics
- Event(s): Triple jump, long jump, sprint
- Club: Royal Australian Air Force, Canberra

Achievements and titles
- Personal best: TJ – 15.61 m (1950)
Medal record
Representing Australia
British Empire Games
Gold medal – first place	1950 Auckland	Triple Jump
Bronze medal – third place	1954 Vancouver	4×110 yard relay
Bronze medal – third place	1954 Vancouver	4×440 yard relay

Brian Thomas Oliver (26 September 1929 – 20 October 2015) was an Australian Olympic athlete who specialised in the triple jump, long jump and sprint running. He won the triple jump event at the 1950 British Empire Games and placed 23rd at the 1956 Summer Olympics. Oliver won the national triple jump title in 1953–54 and 1956, and the long jump title in 1953 and 1956. He was ranked #3 in the world in 1950 and #4 in 1953 in the triple jump.
