= Don McFarlane (athlete, born 1931) =

Canadian sprinter (born 1931)

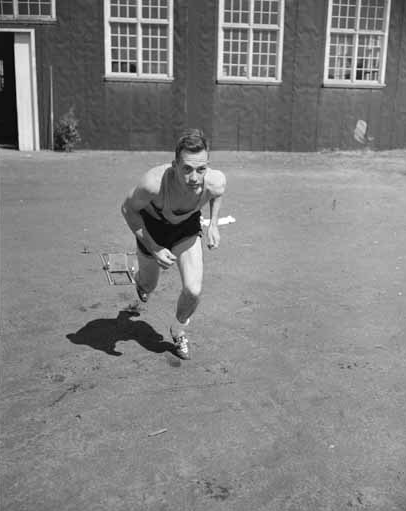
- At the 1954 British Empire and Commonwealth Games; Attribution:Province newspaper

Personal information
- Born: June 10, 1931 (age 95) Toronto, Ontario, Canada

Sport
- Sport: Sprinter
Medal record
Men's athletics
Representing Canada
British Empire and Commonwealth Games
Gold medal – first place	1954 Vancouver	4×110 yards relay
Silver medal – second place	1954 Vancouver	100 yards

James Donald McFarlane (born June 10, 1931) is a Canadian former sprinter.

== Life ==
McFarlane attended McMaster University where he won the 100 and 220 yard races in all four years. McFarlane established a new record of 9.9 seconds in the 100 yd. sprint during the Senior Intercollegiate Championship in 1951. He also competed as a member of the Hamilton Olympic Club and won several junior and senior Canadian Championships.

== Highlights ==
- 1948 M.M. Robinson Athletic Scholarship Medal Awarded to BCHS Athlete of Year
- 1951 Hec Philips Memorial Trophy – Awarded to the Most Outstanding Performance in the Senior Intercollegiate Track and Field Championships
- 1952 and 1954 Awarded the Trophy as the Most Outstanding Athlete in the Hamilton Olympic Club
- 1954 Silver Medal – 100 yard Sprint – British Empire Games – Vancouver, BC
- 1954 Gold Medal – 4×100 yard Relay – British Empire Games – Vancouver, BC
- 1974 Awarded a Provincial Sport Citation by the Province of Ontario
- 1991 Inducted into the McMaster University Sports Hall of Fame
- 2011 Inducted into the Burlington Sports Hall of Fame
