= John Savidge =

British athlete (1924–1979)

Personal information
- Nationality: British (English)
- Born: 18 December 1924 Nottingham, England
- Died: 26 December 1979 (aged 55) Chester, England
- Height: 200 cm (6 ft 7 in)
- Weight: 105 kg (231 lb)

Sport
- Sport: Athletics
- Event: Shot put/Discus
- Club: London Athletic Club
Medal record
Athletics
Representing England
British Empire & Commonwealth Games
Gold medal – first place	1954 Vancouver	Shot put

John Andrew Savidge (18 December 1924 – 26 December 1979) was a British track and field athlete who specialised in the shot put and competed at the 1952 Summer Olympics.

== Biography ==
Savidge was born in Nottingham but was a member of the London Athletic Club.

Savidge finished third behind John Giles in the shot put event at the 1949 AAA Championships The following year he missed out on a spot on the England Empire Games team and shortly afterwards finished second behind Petar Sarcevic at the 1950 AAA Championships. His second place earned him the title of British champion because he was the highest placed athlete in the event. Another second place in 1951 was followed by winning the title outright at the 1952 AAA Championships.

Shortly after his AAA title success he represented the Great Britain team at the 1952 Olympic Games in Helsinki, finishing in a creditable sixth place in the Olympic final. He was Britain's undisputed shot put champion at this time and retained his AAA title in 1953 and 1954. He also reached the podium in the discus throw event at the same Championships.

Savidge represented the England team at the 1954 British Empire and Commonwealth Games and won the shot put title with a games record mark of 16.77 m (55 ft 0 in). He was England's first ever champion in the event.

He also competed at the European Athletics Championships for Great Britain in 1950 and 1954.
