= Ben Nduga =

Ugandan sprinter

Personal information
- Nationality: Ugandan
- Born: 1930

Sport
- Sport: Sprinting
- Event: 100 metres

Benjamin Kiyini Nduga (born 1930) is a Ugandan sprinter. He competed in the men's 100 metres and men's 200 metres at the 1956 Summer Olympics.
