= Ken Box =

British sprinter (1930–2022)

Personal information
- Nationality: British (English)
- Born: 1 December 1930 West Derby, Liverpool, England
- Died: 1 September 2022 (aged 91) Maroochydore, Queensland, Australia
- Height: 174 cm (5 ft 9 in)
- Weight: 70 kg (154 lb)

Sport
- Sport: Athletics
- Event: Sprints/long jump
- Club: Loughborough College; Liverpool Harriers
Medal record
Representing Great Britain
Men's athletics
European Championships
Silver medal – second place	1954 Bern	4×100 m relay

Kenneth James Box (1 December 1930 – 1 September 2022 was a track and field sprinter who competed at the 1956 Summer Olympics.

== Biography ==
Box was born in West Derby and was a member of the Liverpool Harriers.

Box finished third behind George Ellis in the 100 metres event at the 1954 AAA Championships. Shortly afterwards, he represented the England team at the 1954 British Empire and Commonwealth Games in Vancouver, where he was fourth in the relay, having been eliminated in the 100 yards heats.

Also in 1954, he won the silver medal at the 1954 European Athletics Championships in Berne, Switzerland in the men's 4×100 metres relay, alongside George Ellis, Kenneth Jones and Brian Shenton.

Box represented Great Britain at the 1956 Olympic Games in Melbourne in the men's 100 metres and 4×100 metres relay. The year after he became the British 100 yards champion after winning the British AAA Championships title at the 1957 AAA Championships.
