= Muslim Arogundade =

Nigerian sprinter

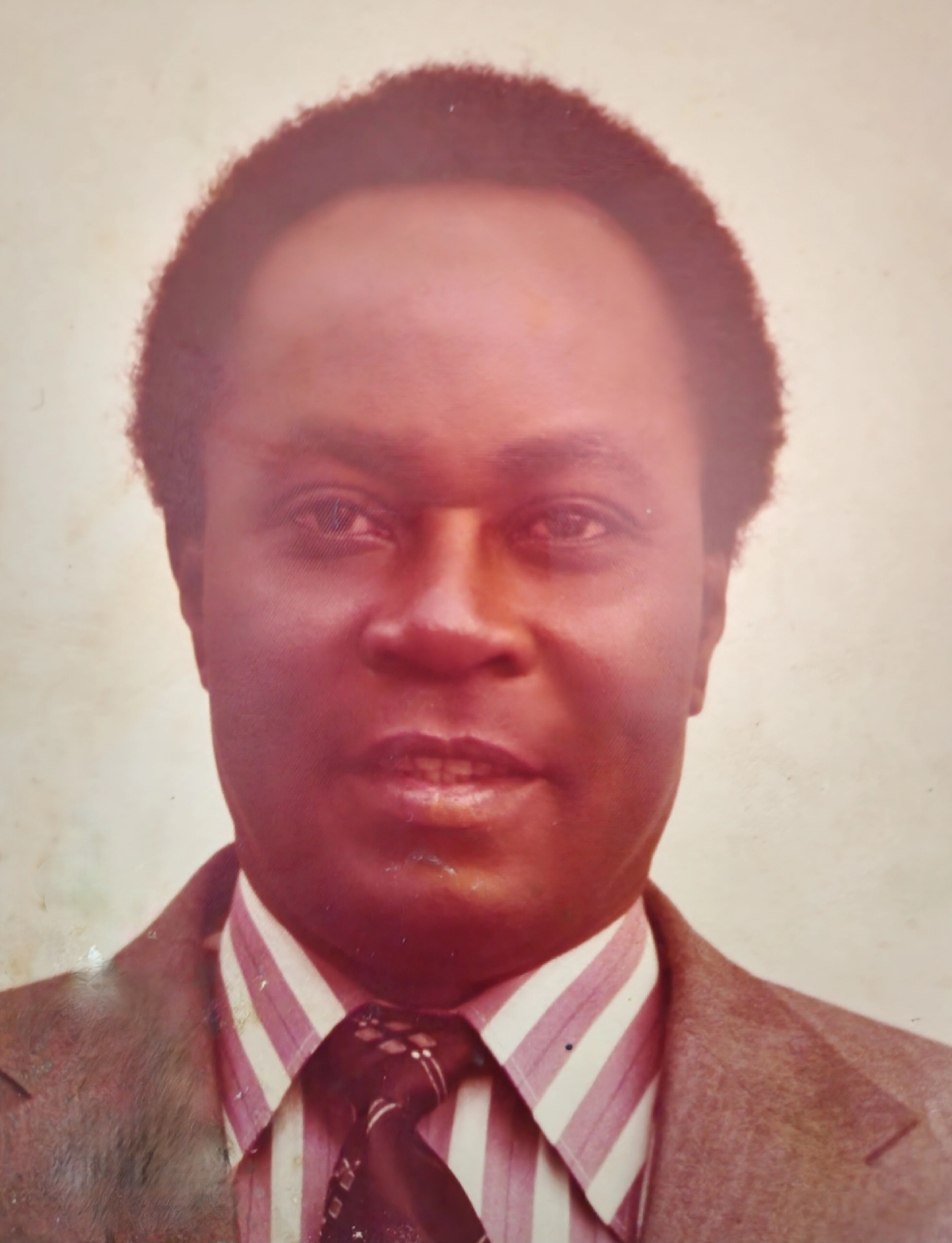
- Arogundade

Personal information
- Nationality: Nigerian
- Born: 24 June 1926 Ibadan, British Nigeria
- Died: unknown Lagos, Nigeria

Sport
- Sport: Sprinting
- Event: 200 metres
Medal record
Men's athletics
Representing Nigeria
British Empire and Commonwealth Games
Silver medal – second place	1954 Vancouver	4×110 yards relay

Muslim Aremu Arogundade (born 24 June 1926, date of death unknown) was a Nigerian sprinter. Domestically, he represented the Lagos United African Company Club. Arogundade would go on and represent Nigeria for their first appearance at an Olympic Games, competing at the 1952 Summer Olympics.

He competed in the men's 200 metres and the men's 4 × 100 metres relay but did not medal. Arogundade also competed at the 1954 British Empire and Commonwealth Games, finishing second in the men's 4 × 110 yards relay.

== Biography ==
Muslim Aremu Arogundade was born on 24 June 1926 in Ibadan, British Nigeria. Domestically, he represented the sports club Lagos United African Company Club. He would be one of the first Nigerian athletics competitors and one of the first Nigerian sportspeople overall to compete at an Olympic Games, as the nation would make its official debut at the Olympic Games at this edition of the competition.

Arogundade first competed in the heats of the men's 200 metres on 22 July against four other athletes. In his heat, he would place last with a time of 22.71 seconds and did not advance further to the quarterfinals. Alongside three other Nigerian sprinters, they would compete in the heats of the men's 4 × 100 metres relay on 26 July against three other relay teams. There, they would place second with a time of 42.4 seconds and advanced to the semifinals the following day. In the semifinals, they would place last out of the five teams in their round, recording a time of 41.9 seconds and did not advance to the finals.

Two years later, he would be part of the Nigerian team at the 1954 British Empire and Commonwealth Games held in Vancouver, Canada. Individually, he would compete in the 100 yards and 220 yards but was eliminated in the heats. Though, he won a silver medal in the men's 4 × 110 yards relay alongside his relay team. He later died in Lagos, Nigeria, though other details of his death are unknown.
