= Hector Hogan =

Australian sprinter (1931–1960)

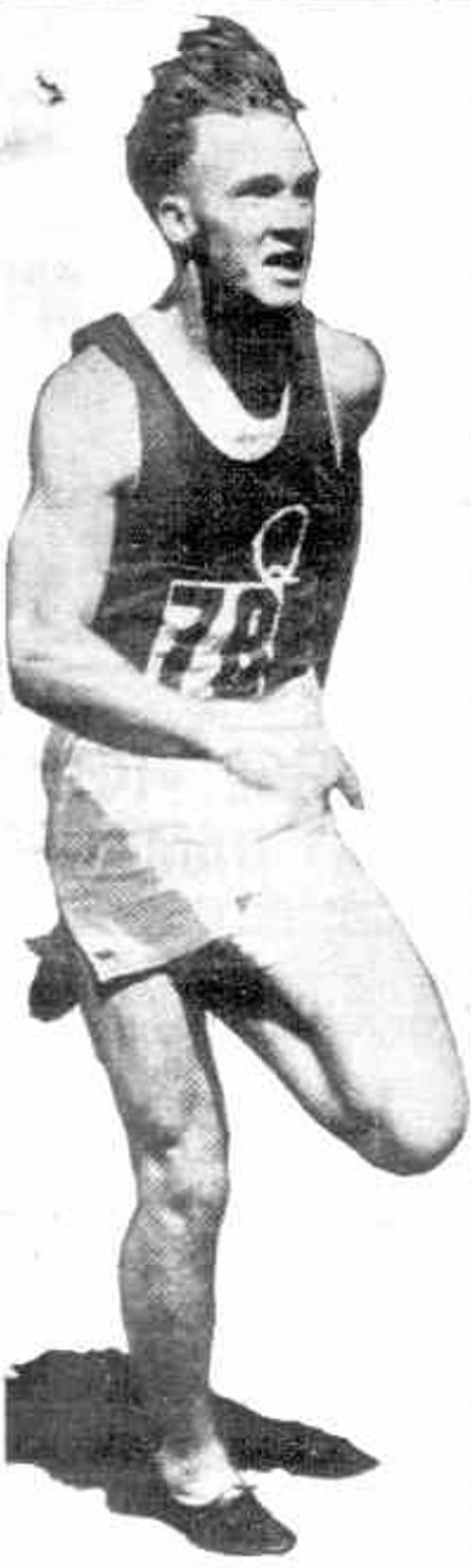
- Hec Hogan, 1954

Personal information
- Nickname: Hec
- Born: 15 July 1931 Rockhampton, Queensland
- Died: 2 September 1960 (aged 29) Brisbane, Queensland
- Resting place: Nudgee Cemetery
- Education: Marist Brothers College, Rosalie
- Spouse: Maureen Hogan

Sport
- Country: Australia
- Sport: Men's Australian Athletics
- Events: 100 yards/100 metres; 220 yards/200 metres; 4 × 100 yards relay; Long jump; Triple jump

Achievements and titles
- Olympic finals: 1956 Melbourne
- National finals: 1952 Athletics Championships: Men's 100-yard dash – Gold; 1953 Athletics Championships: Men's 100-yard dash – Gold; 1954 Athletics Championships: Men's 100-yard dash – Gold; Men's 220 yards – Gold; Men's Long jump – Gold; 1955 Athletics Championships: Men's 100-yard dash – Gold; 1956 Athletics Championships: Men's 100-yard dash – Gold; Men's 220 yards – Gold; 1957 Athletics Championships: Men's 100-yard dash – Gold; 1958 Athletics Championships: Men's 100-yard dash – Gold
- Commonwealth finals: 1954 Vancouver; 1958 Cardiff
Medal record
Men's athletics
Representing Australia
Olympic Games
Bronze medal – third place	1956 Melbourne	100 metres
Commonwealth Games
Bronze medal – third place	1954 Vancouver	4 × 110 yards relay
Bronze medal – third place	1954 Vancouver	100 yards dash
Bronze medal – third place	1958 Cardiff	4 × 110 yards relay

Hector "Hec" Denis Hogan (15 July 1931, Rockhampton – 2 September 1960, Brisbane) was an Australian athlete who competed mainly in the 100 yards and 100 metres sprint, where he was seven-times Australian 100 yards champion. He also competed in the 220 yards/200 metres, which he won twice in the Australian Championships, and the long jump which he won in 1954. He also competed in the triple jump.

In March 1954, he equalled the world record for the 100 yards (9.3 seconds) and 100 metres (10.2 seconds) on a grass track in Sydney. He won bronze medals in the 100 yards and 4 × 100 yards relay at the 1954 Commonwealth Games in Vancouver. His time for the 100 yards was 9.7 seconds. In the 1958 Commonwealth Games at Cardiff he won a bronze for the 4 × 100 yards relay.

He competed for Australia in the 1956 Summer Olympics held in Melbourne, where he won the bronze medal in the 100 metres.

Hogan died on 2 September 1960 of leukaemia, leaving his wife, Maureen, and a son. He was buried in Nudgee Cemetery.

Hogan is related to Callum Davies, the 2023 Australian 1500 m and 5000 m champion.
