= Abdul Karim Amu =

Nigerian sprinter (1933–2010)

Personal information
- Nationality: Nigerian
- Born: 13 November 1933 Lagos, Nigeria
- Died: 9 February 2010 (aged 76) Lagos, Nigeria
- Height: 185 cm (6 ft 1 in)
- Weight: 77 kg (170 lb)

Sport
- Sport: Athletics
- Event: Sprints/400m
Medal record
Men's athletics
Representing Nigeria
British Empire and Commonwealth Games
Silver medal – second place	1954 Vancouver	4×110 yards relay

Abdul Karim Ohimai Amu (13 November 1933 – 9 February 2010) was a Nigerian athlete who mainly competed in the 400m and 4 × 100 meters relay. He was a former president of the Athletics Federation of Nigeria.

== Life ==
By the age of 17, Amu was already a good athlete. He was educated at King's College where his athletic ability brought national attention. In the Grier Cup held at Ijebu-Ode in 1952, Amu won the 100 and 440 yards. In addition, he played for the King's College hockey team and was a member of Nigerian team in an inter-colonial hockey competition held in the Gold Coast. His first major international competition was the 1954 Commonwealth Games held in Vancouver. He competed in the 100m, 200m and 4 × 100 m relay events and was part of Nigeria's relay team that clocked 41.3 to earn a silver at the games. In the 220 yard, he reached the semi-final. He enrolled at University of Ibadan in 1955.

In 1956, he was a member of the University of Ibadan athletic club when he represented Nigeria at the 1956 Summer Olympics in the 400 and 4 × 100 relay events. Nigeria did not medal at the event and the relay team which was formidable dropped the baton and did not finish. In 1960, he was the vice-captain of the Nigerian athletics team to the 1960 Summer Olympics in Rome, once again, he was in the 400m and 4 × 100 m relay team. He reached the semi-finals of the 400m event but the relay team had a baton mixup in the semi-final and did not finish.

In 1964, he was captain of the athletics team to the 1964 Summer Olympics in Tokyo. Amu set a national record in the 220 yard dash that lasted for 16 years.
