= Ken Wilmshurst =

English athlete (1931–1992)

Personal information
- Nationality: British (English)
- Born: 9 April 1931 Calcutta, West Bengal, India
- Died: 3 October 1992 (aged 61) Cobham, England
- Height: 187 cm (6 ft 2 in)
- Weight: 75 kg (165 lb)

Sport
- Sport: Athletics
- Event: triple jump/long jump
- Club: Walton AC
Medal record
Men's Athletics
Representing England
British Empire and Commonwealth Games
Gold medal – first place	1954 Vancouver	Long jump
Gold medal – first place	1954 Vancouver	Triple jump

Kenneth Stanley David Wilmshurst (9 April 1931 – 3 October 1992) was an Olympic athlete from England who competed at the 1956 Summer Olympics.

== Biography ==
Born in Calcutta, West Bengal (India), he specialised in the long jump and triple jump events during his career.

Wilmshurst became the British triple jump champion after winning the British AAA Championships title at the 1953 AAA Championships and successfully retained the title at the 1954 AAA Championships.

He represented England and won double gold in the long jump and triple jump at the 1954 British Empire and Commonwealth Games in Vancouver, Canada.

After securing two more AAA triple jump titles at the 1955 AAA Championships and the 1956 AAA Championships, he represented Great Britain at the 1956 Olympic Games in Melbourne, for which he also served as athletics captain.

Wilmshurst won a fifth consecutive triple jump title at the 1957 AAA Championships. He then represented the England athletics team in the long jump and triple jump at the 1958 British Empire and Commonwealth Games in Cardiff, Wales.

He was the series champion in The Krypton Factor, made by Granada Television, shown on ITV in 1978.

He died in Cobham, Surrey, aged 61.
