= George Ellis (athlete) =

English sprinter (1932–2023)

Personal information
- Nationality: British (English)
- Born: 7 September 1932
- Died: 17 January 2023 (aged 90)

Sport
- Sport: Athletics
- Event: Sprints
- Club: Cumberland Grammar School; London Athletic Club
Medal record
Men's athletics
Representing Great Britain
European Championships
Silver medal – second place	1954 Bern	4×100 m
Bronze medal – third place	1954 Bern	100 m
Bronze medal – third place	1954 Bern	200 m

George Stuart Ellis (7 September 1932 – 17 January 2023) was an athlete who competed for England.

== Biography ==
He attended Keswick Grammar School (now Keswick School). He finished third in both the 100 yards and 220 yards events at the 1951 AAA Championships (both won by McDonald Bailey).

Ellis had a sensational year in 1954, he became the British 100 yards champion after winning the British AAA Championships title at the 1954 AAA Championships and later that month he represented England in the sprint disciplines at the 1954 British Empire and Commonwealth Games in Vancouver, Canada. One month later in August, he won three medals at the 1954 European Athletics Championships in Bern and was the British number one for 1954.

Ellis became the British 220 yards champion after winning the AAA title at the 1955 AAA Championships.

Ellis died on 17 January 2023, at the age of 90.
