= Athletics at the 1954 British Empire and Commonwealth Games =

Athletics at the 5th British Empire and Commonwealth Games
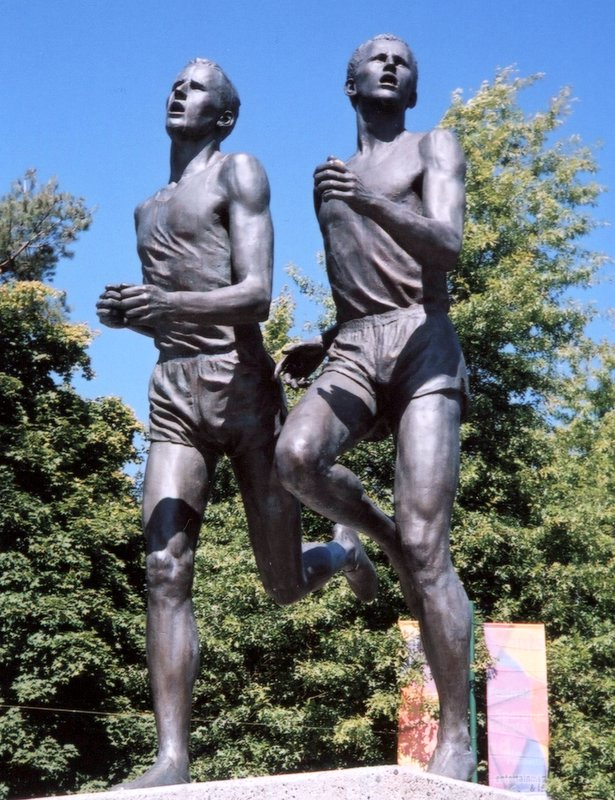
- A sculpture of Bannister and Landy was placed outside the Empire Stadium to commemorate the Miracle Mile.
- Dates: 31 July – 7 August 1954
- Host city: Vancouver, British Columbia, Canada
- Venue: Empire Stadium
- Level: Senior
- Events: 29
- Participation: 249 athletes from 23 nations

At the 1954 British Empire and Commonwealth Games, the athletics events were held at Empire Stadium in Vancouver, British Columbia, Canada in July and August 1954. A total of 29 athletics events were contested at the Games, 20 by men and 9 by women. A total of twenty-four Games records were set or improved over the competition, leaving just five previous best marks untouched. The 1954 edition saw the introduction of the shot put and discus throw for women, as well as the first 4 × 110 yards relay for women (which replaced a medley relay).

The men's mile run competition – dubbed The Miracle Mile – represented a landmark in the history of the Four-minute mile. Roger Bannister had been the first to have broken the barrier earlier that year, but Landy followed soon after with sub-4 minute (and world record time) of his own. The games offered the first time that two sub-4 minute runners had duelled against each other. Landy led until the final curve, at which point he turned to gauge Bannister's position. Bannister took the opportunity to overtake him on his blind side and he edged out a victory over Landy with a time of 3:58.8 minutes. Landy also ran under four minutes, representing the first time two men had done so in the same race. A sculpture of the race-deciding moment was later placed outside the stadium in memory of the duel.

Jim Peters, then the world record holder in the marathon, entered the stadium some seventeen minutes ahead of his nearest rival in the Games marathon. However, he collapsed several times in his final lap of the stadium and did not finish the race which was won by Joe McGhee.

A new Commonwealth record for the high jump was established at the games by Emmanuel Ifeajuna of Nigeria, who became the first Commonwealth athlete to clear six feet and eight inches. Ifeajuna was also the first black African to win a gold medal at the Commonwealth Games.

== Medal summary ==
=== Men ===
Medallists in the men's events with times, heights and distances; link to details of each event
Event	Gold		Silver		Bronze	
100 yards	Mike Agostini (TRI)	9.6 =GR	Don McFarlane (CAN)	9.7	Hector Hogan (AUS)	9.7
220 yards	Don Jowett (NZL)	21.5	Brian Shenton (ENG)	21.5	Ken Jones (WAL)	21.9
440 yards	Kevan Gosper (AUS)	47.2 GR	Don Jowett (NZL)	47.4	Terry Tobacco (CAN)	47.8
880 yards	Derek Johnson (ENG)	1:50.7 GR	Brian Hewson (ENG)	1:51.2	Ian Boyd (ENG)	1:51.9
1 mile	Roger Bannister (ENG)	3:58.8 GR	John Landy (AUS)	3:59.6	Rich Ferguson (CAN)	4:04.6
3 miles	Chris Chataway (ENG)	13:35.2 GR	Fred Green (ENG)	13:37.2	Frank Sando (ENG)	13:37.4
6 miles	Peter Driver (ENG)	29:09.4 GR	Frank Sando (ENG)	29:10.0	Jim Peters (ENG)	29:20.0
Marathon	Joe McGhee (SCO)	2:39:36	Jack Mekler (SAF)	2:40:57	Johannes Barnard (SAF)	2:51:50
120 yards hurdles	Keith Gardner (JAM)	14.2 GR	Chris Higham (ENG)	14.9	Norman Williams (CAN)	14.9
440 yards hurdles	David Lean (AUS)	52.4 GR	Harry Kane (ENG)	53.3	Bob Shaw (WAL)	53.3
4 × 110 yards relay	Canada (CAN); Bruce Springbett; Don Stonehouse; Harry Nelson; Don McFarlane	41.3 GR	Nigeria (NGR); Muslim Arogundade; Abdul Karim Amu; Karim Olowu; Edward Ajado	41.3	Australia (AUS); David Lean; Hector Hogan; Brian Oliver; Kevan Gosper	41.7
4 × 440 yards relay	England (ENG); Peter Higgins; Alan Dick; Peter Fryer; Derek Johnson	3:11.2 GR	Canada (CAN); Laird Sloan; Douglas Clement; Joe Foreman; Terry Tobacco	3:11.6	Australia (AUS); Brian Oliver; Don MacMillan; David Lean; Kevan Gosper	3:16.0
High jump	Emmanuel Ifeajuna (NGR)	2.03 m GR	Patrick Etolu (UGA)	1.99 m NR	Nafiu Osagie (NGR)	1.99 m
Pole vault	Geoff Elliott (ENG)	4.26 m GR	Ron Miller (CAN)	4.20 m	Andries Burger (SAF)	4.13 m
Long jump	Ken Wilmshurst (ENG)	7.54 m GR	Karim Olowu (NGR)	7.39 m	Sylvanus Williams (NGR)	7.22 m
Triple jump	Ken Wilmshurst (ENG)	15.28 m	Peter Esiri (NGR)	15.25 m	Brian Oliver (AUS)	15.14 m
Shot put	John Savidge (ENG)	16.77 m GR	John Pavelich (CAN)	14.95 m	Stephanus du Plessis (SAF)	14.93 m
Discus throw	Stephanus du Plessis (SAF)	51.70 m GR	Roy Pella (CAN)	49.53 m	Mark Pharaoh (ENG)	47.84 m
Hammer throw	Muhammad Iqbal (PAK)	55.37 m GR	Jakobus Dreyer (SAF)	54.75 m	Ewan Douglas (SCO)	52.81 m
Javelin throw	James Achurch (AUS)	68.52 m GR	Muhammad Nawaz (PAK)	68.09 m	Jalal Khan (PAK)	67.50 m

=== Women ===
Medallists in the women's events with times, heights and distances; link to details of each event
Event	Gold		Silver		Bronze	
100 yards	Marjorie Jackson-Nelson (AUS)	10.7w	Winsome Cripps (AUS)	10.8w	Edna Maskell (NRH)	10.8w
220 yards	Marjorie Jackson-Nelson (AUS)	24.0 GR	Winsome Cripps (AUS)	24.5	Shirley Hampton (ENG)	25.0
80 metres hurdles (wind: +4.5 m/s)	Edna Maskell (NRH)	10.9w	Gwen Hobbins (CAN)	11.2w	Jean Desforges (ENG)	11.2w
4 × 110 yards relay	Australia (AUS); Gwen Wallace; Winsome Cripps; Nancy Fogarty; Marjorie Jackson	46.8 GR	England (ENG); Anne Pashley; Heather Armitage; Shirley Burgess; Shirley Hampton	46.9	Canada (CAN); Margery Squires; Dorothy Kozak; Annabelle Murray; Geraldine Bemister	47.8
High jump	Thelma Hopkins (NIR)	1.67 m GR	Dorothy Tyler (ENG)	1.60 m	Alice Whitty (CAN)	1.60 m
Long jump	Yvette Williams (NZL)	6.08 m GR	Thelma Hopkins (NIR)	5.84 m	Jean Desforges (ENG)	5.84 m
Shot put	Yvette Williams (NZL)	13.96 m GR	Jackie MacDonald (CAN)	12.98 m	Magdalena Swanepoel (SAF)	12.81 m
Discus throw	Yvette Williams (NZL)	45.01 m GR	Suzanne Allday (ENG)	40.02 m	Marie Dupree (CAN)	38.66 m
Javelin throw	Magdalena Swanepoel (SAF)	43.83 m GR	Pearl Fisher (NRH)	41.97 m	Shirley Couzens (CAN)	38.98 m

== Medal table ==
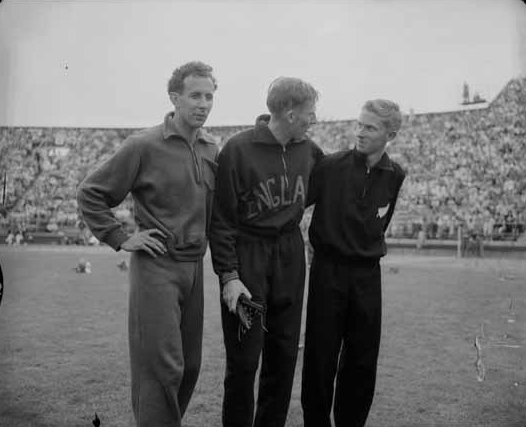
The one mile medallists left to right - Landy, Bannister, Halberg. Attribution:Province newspaper

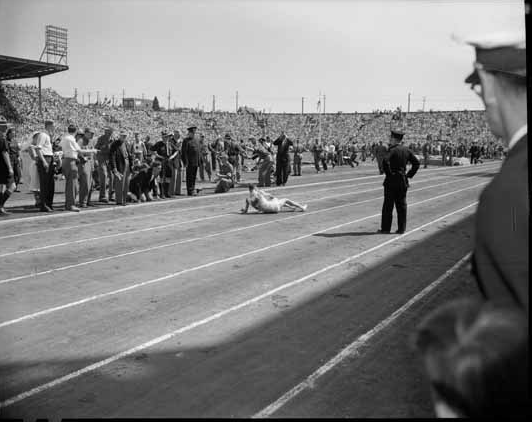
Jim Peters collapses again during the final stages of the marathon Attribution:Province newspaper

* Host nation (Canada)

Medals won by nation, with totals
Rank	Nation	Gold	Silver	Bronze	Total
1	England (ENG)	9	9	7	25
2	Australia (AUS)	6	3	4	13
3	New Zealand (NZL)	4	1	0	5
4	South Africa (SAF)	2	2	4	8
5	Canada (CAN)*	1	7	7	15
6	Nigeria (NGR)	1	3	2	6
7	Northern Rhodesia (NRH)	1	1	1	3
7	Pakistan (PAK)	1	1	1	3
9	Northern Ireland (NIR)	1	1	0	2
10	Scotland (SCO)	1	0	1	2
11	Jamaica (JAM)	1	0	0	1
11	Trinidad and Tobago (TRI)	1	0	0	1
13	Uganda (UGA)	0	1	0	1
14	Wales (WAL)	0	0	2	2
Totals (14 entries)		29	29	29	87

== Participating nations ==
- Australia (27)
- Bahamas (3)
- Bermuda (3)
- British Guiana (1)
- Canada (69)
- England (39)
- Fiji (11)
- Gold Coast (7)
- Hong Kong (1)
- India (4)
- Jamaica (8)
- Kenya (9)
- New Zealand (14)
- Nigeria (9)
- Northern Ireland (5)
- Northern Rhodesia (3)
- Pakistan (8)
- Scotland (6)
- South Africa (7)
- Southern Rhodesia (1)
- Trinidad and Tobago (3)
- Uganda (5)
- Wales (6)
