= Karim Olowu =

Nigerian long jumper and sprinter (1924–2019)

Alhaji Karim Ayinla Babalola Olowu OON OLY
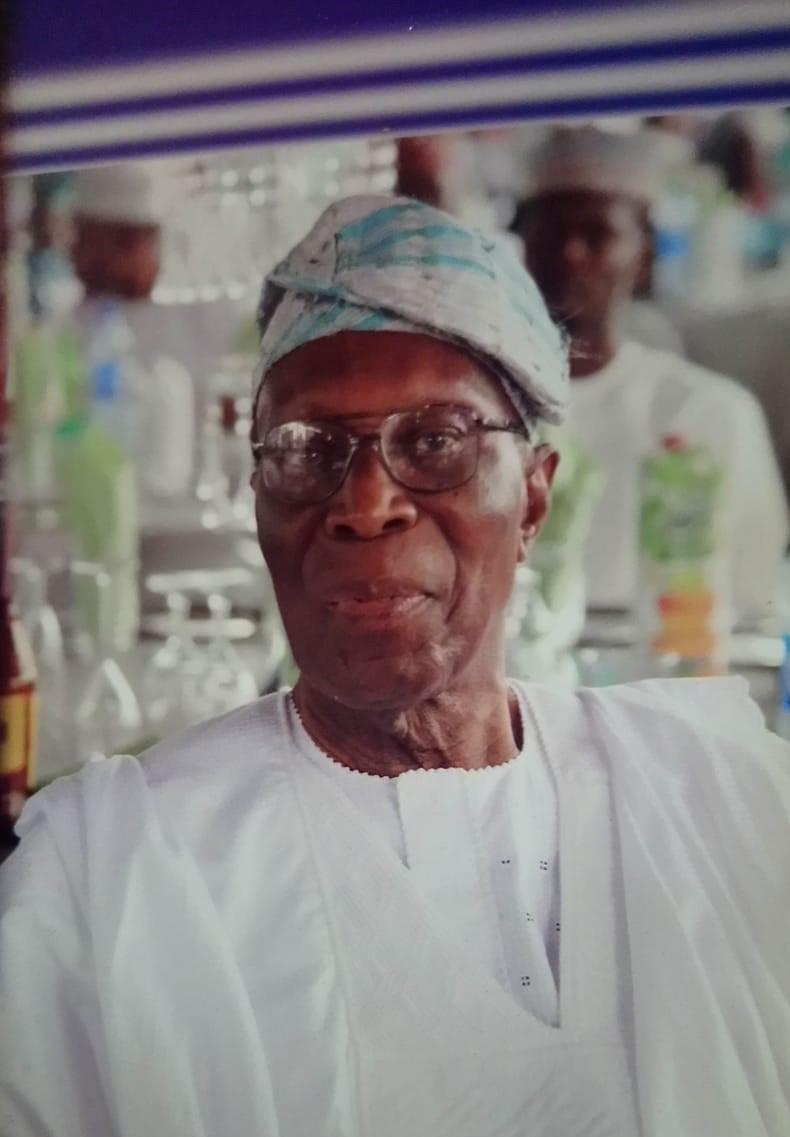

Personal information
- Nicknames: KAB, Capee
- Born: 7 June 1924 Lagos, Nigeria
- Died: 14 August 2019 (aged 95) Lagos, Nigeria
- Education: Loughborough College

Sport
- Sport: Track and field
- Events: 100 meters, 4×100 meters, 4×110 yards, Long jump
- University team: Loughborough University Athletics Club

Achievements and titles
- Olympic finals: Helsinki 1952, Melbourne 1956
- Commonwealth finals: Auckland 1950, Canada 1954
Medal record
Men's athletics
Representing Nigeria
Event / 1st / 2nd / 3rd; Commonwealth Games / 0 / 2 / 0
British Empire and Commonwealth Games
Silver medal – second place	1954 Vancouver	4×110 yards relay
Silver medal – second place	1954 Vancouver	Long jump

Alhaji Karim Ayinla Babalola "KAB" Olowu (7 June 1924 – 14 August 2019) was a Nigerian sprinter and long jumper who was part of Nigeria's first delegation to the Olympic Games and the Commonwealth Games.

Olowu participated in the 1952 Summer Olympics and in the 1956 Summer Olympics. Two years prior to his appearance at the Olympics, he participated in the 1950 British Empire Games (now the Commonwealth Games) in Auckland, New Zealand. At the 1954 British Empire and Commonwealth Games held in Canada, he won silver medals in long jump and the 4×110 yards relay, becoming the first Nigerian athlete to win two medals at the Commonwealth Games. At the 1992 Barcelona Olympics he became the first Nigerian Olympic torch bearer. He was one of Africa's oldest living Olympians.

== Early life ==
Olowu was born in Lagos, Nigeria on 7 June 1924 to B. M. S. Olowu and R. A. Olowu (née Tinubu). He is the first grandson of Madam Tinubu and Saka Tinubu, part of a wealthy Yoruba family. He attended Saint Paul's Primary School, Breadfruit Lagos where in 1936 he began his sporting career represented his school in the Empire Day Athletics in commemoration of the British Empire Day, which was celebrated in Britain and its colonies before the independence in 1960. He later attended CMS Grammar School, Lagos where he was the sports prefect (Prefectus Ludorum). He started working as a civil servant before he won a Federal Government scholarship to study Physical Education in Loughborough College Leicestershire, England in 1952. He graduated with honors in 1955

== Athletic career ==
Olowu was among the first group of Nigerians to participate in the Olympic Games. He represented the country twice at the Olympics in 1952 and 1956 respectively in long jump and relay race. He also took part in the Commonwealth Games of 1950, 1954 and 1958. He won silver medals in the long jump and sprint relay at the 1958 edition.

Olowu won three British AAA Championships titles at the 1953 AAA Championships, 1955 AAA Championships, and 1958 AAA Championships.

=== Athletics official ===
Olowu served in athletics in many other capacities. He was a prominent member of the Athletics Federation of Nigeria (AFN) for several years. He was an official at the 8th Commonwealth Games in Kingston, Jamaica in 1966. He was the Nigerian team manager to the 1976 Summer Olympics, Montréal, Canada. All the African countries eventually boycotted the Canada games because of the presence of the then apartheid South Africa at the games. He served as the chairman, Lagos State Sports Council. He was the chief starter at the 1973 All-Africa Games held in Lagos, Nigeria. He also served as captain and as a coach of the national teams at various times.

== Later life ==
After he retired from his athletics career, Olowu worked in the Nigerian Prison system but his love for sports was never far behind. He set up the sports complex at the Nigerian Prison in Kirikiri, Lagos where he worked for some years and set up the then Prisons Athletics club which produced many athletes for Nigeria. Olowu was married to Aminat Olowu (née Abina) until her death. He was the Chairman of the Olowu descendants Union and he was also the head of the Tinubu Family. He had many children, grandchildren and great-grandchildren. Olowu died on 14 August 2019 at his daughters family hospital and was buried the next day according to Muslim rites.

== Recognition ==
- The Nigerian Olympic Committee Inc Award (1995)
- Ten years merit award from the Athletic Federation of Nigeria AFN (1996)
- National Sports Award (1987)
- OGS Merit Awards for contribution and service to CMS Grammar School in particular and Nigeria as a federation (2003)
- Special awards and meritorious service to the development of sports in Nigeria by Football College(2001)
- Officer of the Order of Niger (OON) (2006)
