= Athletics at the 1952 Summer Olympics – Men's 4 × 100 metres relay =

Men's 4 × 100 metres relay at the Games of the XV Olympiad
- Dates: July 26, 1952 (heats); July 27, 1952 (semifinals, final)
- Competitors: from 22 nations
- Teams: 22
- Winning time: 40.1

Medalists
1st place, gold medalist(s)		Dean Smith; Harrison Dillard; Lindy Remigino; Andy Stanfield	United States
2nd place, silver medalist(s)		Boris Tokarev; Levan Kalyayev; Levan Sanadze; Vladimir Sukharev	Soviet Union
3rd place, bronze medalist(s)		László Zarándi; Géza Varasdi; György Csányi; Béla Goldoványi	Hungary

The men's 4 × 100 metres relay event at the 1952 Olympic Games took place on July 26 and July 27. The United States team won the final.

== Results ==
=== Heats ===
The first round was held on July 26. The three fastest teams from each heat qualified to the semifinals.

Video on YouTube amateur film of Heat 1

Heat 1

Rank	Nation	Competitors	Time (hand)	Time (automatic)	Notes
1	United States	Harrison Dillard, Lindy Remigino, Dean Smith, Andy Stanfield	40.3	40.34	Q
2	France	Étienne Bally, René Bonino, Yves Camus, Alain Porthault	40.8	40.98	Q
3	Poland	Zygmunt Buhl, Emil Kiszka, Zdobysław Stawczyk, Dominik Sucheński	41.8	42.00	Q
4	Finland	Issi Baran, Voitto Hellstén, Pauli Tavisalo, Adolf Turakainen	42.0	42.20	
5	Canada	Gordon Crosby, Robert Hutchinson, Don McFarlane, Walter Sutton	42.6	42.73	
6	Portugal	Fernando Casimiro, Eugénio Eleuterio, Rui Maia, Tomás Paquete	42.8	43.01	
7	Egypt	Fawzi Chaaban, Youssef Ali Omar, Emad El-Din Shafei, Fouad Yazgi	42.9	43.02	

Heat 2

Rank	Nation	Competitors	Time (hand)	Time (automatic)	Notes
1	Great Britain	McDonald Bailey, Jack Gregory, William Jack, Brian Shenton	41.2	41.43	Q
2	Italy	Franco Leccese, Antonio Siddi, Giorgio Sobrero, Carlo Vittori	41.5	41.73	Q
3	Cuba	Samuel Anderson, Rafael Fortún, Angel García, Evelio Planas	41.9	42.14	Q
4	Ghana	George Acquaah, Gabriel Lareya, Augustus Lawson, John Owusu	42.1	42.27	
5	Australia	Edwin Carr, Jr., Morris Curotta, Ken Doubleday, Ray Weinberg	42.3	42.38	
6	Thailand	Pongamat Amatayakul, Boonterm Pakpuang, Aroon Sakosik, Adul Wanasatith	44.5	44.81	

Heat 3

Rank	Nation	Competitors	Time (hand)	Time (automatic)	Notes
1	Hungary	György Csányi, Béla Goldoványi, Géza Varasdi, László Zarándi	41.0	41.15	Q
2	Czechoslovakia	František Brož, Jiří David, Miroslav Horčic, Zdeněk Pospíšil	41.5	41.49	Q
3	Argentina	Mariano Acosta, Enrique Beckles, Gerardo Bönnhoff, Romeo Galán	41.5	41.56	Q
4	Germany	Franz Happernagel, Josef Heinen, Peter Kraus, Werner Zandt	41.5	41.63	
5	Switzerland	Willy Eichenberger, Ernst Mühlethaler, Willy Schneider, Hans Wehrli	41.6	41.81	

Heat 4

Rank	Nation	Competitors	Time (hand)	Time (automatic)	Notes
1	Soviet Union	Levan Kalyayev, Levan Sanadze, Vladimir Sukharev, Boris Tokarev	41.3	41.45	Q
2	Nigeria	Muslim Arogundade, Titus Erinle, Karim Olowu, Rafiu Oluwa	42.4	42.63	Q
3	Pakistan	Muhammad Aslam, Abdul Aziz, Muhammad Shariff Butt, Muhammad Fazil	42.8	42.91	Q
4	Iceland	Ásmundur Bjarnason, Hörður Haraldsson, Pétur Sigurðsson, Ingi Þorsteinsson	DSQ		

=== Semifinals ===
The semifinals were held on July 27. The three fastest teams from each heat advanced to the final

Heat 1

Rank	Country	Time (hand)	Time (automatic)	Notes
1	United States	40.4	40.51	Q
2	Soviet Union	40.7	41.01	Q
3	Great Britain	41.0	41.24	Q
4	Argentina	41.4	41.61	
5	Poland	41.8	41.91	
6	Pakistan	42.0	42.15	

Heat 2

Rank	Country	Time (hand)	Time (automatic)	Notes
1	Hungary	40.9	40.99	Q
2	France	40.9	41.02	Q
3	Czechoslovakia	41.3	41.46	Q
4	Cuba	41.5	41.67	
5	Nigeria	41.9	42.01	
–	Italy	DNS	–	

Podium

=== Final ===
Rank	Country	Time (hand)	Time (automatic)	Notes
1st place, gold medalist(s)	United States	40.1	40.26	
2nd place, silver medalist(s)	Soviet Union	40.3	40.58	
3rd place, bronze medalist(s)	Hungary	40.5	40.83	
4	Great Britain	40.6	40.85	
5	France	40.9	41.10	
6	Czechoslovakia	41.2	41.41	
