= Athletics at the 1953 World Festival of Youth and Students =

The 4th World Festival of Youth and Students featured an athletics competition among its programme of events. The events were contested in Bucharest, Romania in August 1953. Mainly contested among Eastern European athletes, it served as an alternative to the more Western European-oriented 1953 Summer International University Sports Week held in Dortmund the same year.

The event reached new peaks, in particular with men's long-distance battles between multiple Olympic champion Emil Zátopek and future Olympic champion Vladimir Kuts (Zátopek won both contests). Ardalion Ignatyev, Yevgeniy Bulanchik, Anatoliy Yulin, Josef Doležal, Ödön Földessy, Leonid Shcherbakov all went on to claim gold medals at the 1954 European Athletics Championships a year later. The men's hammer throw saw European champion Sverre Strandli take on and defeat the reigning Olympic champion József Csermák.

The women's events contained similarly high profile athletes. Aleksandra Chudina defended three of her four titles from the previous edition and won a different fourth title in the javelin throw (having won the 80 metres hurdles in 1951 instead). Nina Otkalenko won the 800 metres – a feat she would repeat at the 1954 European Championships – and Maria Golubnichaya did the same in the 80 m hurdles. The 1948 Olympic championOlga Gyarmati returned but was again held off the long jump podium by Chudina. Having won the Olympic title since her previous runner-up performance at the tournament, shot putter Galina Zybina went on better and won the world student title. Nina Ponomaryova defended her discus throw title, having also become Olympic champion in the meantime.

Yevgeniy Bulanchik (110 m hurdles), Leonid Shcherbakov (triple jump), Ferenc Klics (discus) and Aleksandra Chudina (high jump) became the first athletes to win three consecutive titles in a discipline at the World Festival of Youth and Students. The Soviet Union and East Germany won most of the women's medals, while the men's events were dominated by Soviet, Czechoslovak and Hungarian athletes.

== Medal summary ==
=== Men ===
Event	Gold		Silver		Bronze	
100 metres	Angel Gavrilov (BUL) Václav Janeček (TCH)	10.6	Not awarded		Vladimir Sukharev (URS)	10.7
200 metres	Václav Janeček (TCH)	21.0	Ardalion Ignatyev (URS)	21.1	Ewald Schröder (GDR)	21.3
400 metres	Ardalion Ignatyev (URS)	46.8	Milan Fillo (TCH)	48.0	Edmunds Pīlāgs (URS)	48.3
800 metres	Stanislav Jungwirth (TCH)	1:51.4	Jenő Bakos (HUN)	1:51.8	Edmund Potrzebowski (POL)	1:51.9
1500 metres	Stanislav Jungwirth (TCH)	3:46.2	Ernő Béres (HUN)	3:46.6	Sándor Iharos (HUN)	3:48.8
5000 metres	Emil Zátopek (TCH)	14:03.0	Vladimir Kuts (URS)	14:04.0	József Kovács (HUN)	14:04.2
10,000 metres	Emil Zátopek (TCH)	29:25.8	Vladimir Kuts (URS)	29:41.4	Aleksandr Anufriyev (URS)	30:03.4
3000 metres steeplechase	Fyodor Marulin (URS)	8:56.2	László Jeszenszky (HUN)	8:57.4	József Apró (HUN)	9:03.0
110 m hurdles	Yevgeniy Bulanchik (URS)	14.4	Jan Mrázek (TCH)	14.7	Sergey Popov (URS)	14.7
400 m hurdles	Yuriy Lituyev (URS)	51.5	Anatoliy Yulin (URS)	51.8	Antal Lippay (HUN)	52.4
4 × 100 m relay	Hungary (HUN); György Csányi; Géza Varasdi; László Zarándi; Béla Goldoványi	41.5	Czechoslovakia (TCH); František Brož; Milan Fillo; Václav Janeček; Zdeněk Pospíšil	41.5	Soviet Union (URS); Lev Kalyayev; Levan Sanadze; Vladimir Sukharev; Boris Tokarev	41.6
4 × 400 m relay	Soviet Union (URS); Edmunds Pīlāgs; Ivan Bondarenko; Yuriy Lituyev; Ardalion Ignatyev	3:10.8	Hungary (HUN); Ferenc Bánhalmi; Zoltán Adamik; Egon Solymosi; Lajos Szentgáli	3:11.2	East Germany (GDR); Werner Schneider; Willi Bromberger; Rolf Bäslack; Gerhard Brauch	3:13.8
10,000 m walk	Josef Doležal (TCH)	44:09.8	Sándor László (HUN)	46:09.8	Ion Baboie (ROM)	46:15.4
50 km walk	Antal Róka (HUN)	4:26:19	Ion Baboie (ROM)	4:29:41	Ivan Yarmish (URS)	4:35:36
High jump	Ioan Soter (ROM)	2.00 m	Jaroslav Kovář (TCH)	1.93 m	Yuriy Ilyasov (URS)	1.93 m
Pole vault	Petro Denysenko (URS)	4.25 m	Tamás Homonnay (HUN)	4.20 m	Vladimir Brazhnik (URS)	4.20 m
Long jump	Ödön Földessy (HUN)	7.63 m	Viktor Leskyevich (URS)	7.34 m	Horst Ihlenfeld (GDR)	7.33 m
Triple jump	Leonid Shcherbakov (URS)	15.63 m	Martin Řehák (TCH)	15.02 m	Georg Frister (GDR)	14.90 m
Shot put	Jiří Skobla (TCH)	16.76 m	Otto Grigalka (URS)	16.23 m	Georgiy Fyodorov (URS)	16.09 m
Discus throw	Ferenc Klics (HUN)	49.27 m	Mikhail Krivosonov (URS)	48.90 m	Karel Merta (TCH)	48.43 m
Hammer throw	Sverre Strandli (NOR)	58.49 m	József Csermák (HUN)	58.49 m	Mikhail Krivosonov (URS)	57.90 m
Javelin throw	Vladimir Kuznetsov (URS)	74.76 m	Viktor Tsybulenko (URS)	73.47 m	Zbigniew Radziwonowicz (POL)	69.51 m
Decathlon	Vladimir Volkov (URS)	6308 pts	Walter Meier (GDR)	6194 pts	Gheorghe Zimbresteanu (ROM)	6188 pts

=== Women ===
Event	Gold		Silver		Bronze	
100 metres	Christa Seliger (GDR)	11.7	Nadezhda Dvalishvili (URS)	11.8	Alice Karger (GDR)	11.9
200 metres	Christa Seliger (GDR)	23.9	Nadezhda Dvalishvili (URS)	24.1	Alice Karger (GDR)	24.5
400 metres	Polina Solopova (URS)	56.3	Nina Otkalenko (URS)	56.7	Ursula Jurewitz (GDR)	57.1
800 metres	Nina Otkalenko (URS)	2:10.5	Nina Chernoshchuk (URS)	2:12.7	Aranka Kazi (HUN)	2:13.5
80 m hurdles	Mariya Golubnichaya (URS)	11.2	Olga Gyarmati (HUN)	11.3	Zlata Lobintseva (URS)	11.4
4 × 100 m relay	East Germany (GDR); Christa Stubnick; Alice Köckritz-Karger; Roselinde Anders; Annemarie Claussner	46.5	Soviet Union (URS); Flora Kazantseva; Olga Kosheleva; Lidiya Polinichenko; Valentina Sopova	47.8	Hungary (HUN); Aranka Szabó-Bartha; Klára Soós; Ibolya Tilkovszky; Irén Lohász	47.9
4 × 200 m relay	Soviet Union (URS) "A"; Vera Krepkina; Flora Kazantseva; Nadezhda Khnykina-Dvalishvili; Zinaida Safronova	1:36.4	East Germany (GDR); Gisela Köhler; Christa Stubnick; Alice Köckritz-Karger; Annemarie Claussner	1:37.0	Soviet Union (URS) "B"; Galina Bystrova; Olga Kosheleva; Polina Solopova; Zlata Lobintseva	1:40.1
High jump	Aleksandra Chudina (URS)	1.64 m	Olga Modrachová (TCH)	1.61 m	Nina Kosova (URS)	1.58 m
Long jump	Aleksandra Chudina (URS)	5.98 m	Galina Segen (URS)	5.76 m	Olga Gyarmati (HUN)	5.69 m
Shot put	Galina Zybina (URS)	15.34 m	Tamara Tyshkevich (URS)	15.16 m	Mariya Kuznetsova (URS)	13.91 m
Discus throw	Nina Ponomaryova (URS)	52.63 m	Yevgeniya Arzumanova (URS)	46.75 m	Valentina Sbitnyeva (URS)	44.38 m
Javelin throw	Aleksandra Chudina (URS)	49.39 m	Lyudmila Vasilyeva (URS)	47.53 m	Nadezhda Korneyeva (URS)	46.70 m
Pentathlon	Aleksandra Chudina (URS)	4888 pts	Galina Segen (URS)	4109 pts	Lyudmila Aralova (URS)	4043 pts

== Medal table ==
Rank	Nation	Gold	Silver	Bronze	Total
1	Soviet Union (URS)	19	18	17	54
2	Czechoslovakia (TCH)	8	6	1	15
3	Hungary (HUN)	4	8	7	19
4	East Germany (GDR)	3	2	7	12
5	Romania (ROM)	1	1	2	4
6	Bulgaria (BUL)	1	0	0	1
6	Norway (NOR)	1	0	0	1
8	Poland (POL)	0	0	2	2
Totals (8 entries)		37	35	36	108

== See also ==
- FISU World University Games § Precursors
- University and college sport
