= 1954 European Athletics Championships – Men's 4 × 100 metres relay =

Men's 4 × 100 metres relay at the European Athletics Championships

The men's 4 × 100 metres relay at the 1954 European Athletics Championships was held in Bern, Switzerland, at Stadion Neufeld on 27 and 29 August 1954.

== Medalists ==
| Gold | László Zarándi; Géza Varasdi; György Csányi; Béla Goldoványi; Hungary |
| Silver | Ken Box; George Ellis; Ken Jones; Brian Shenton; Great Britain |
| Bronze | Boris Tokarev; Viktor Ryabov; Levan Sanadze; Leonid Bartenyev; Soviet Union |

== Results ==
=== Final ===
29 August

| Rank | Nation | Competitors | Time | Notes |
|---|---|---|---|---|
| 1st place, gold medalist(s) | Hungary | László Zarándi; Géza Varasdi; György Csányi; Béla Goldoványi | 40.6 | CR |
| 2nd place, silver medalist(s) | Great Britain | Ken Box; George Ellis; Ken Jones; Brian Shenton | 40.8 | |
| 3rd place, bronze medalist(s) | Soviet Union | Boris Tokarev; Viktor Ryabov; Levan Sanadze; Leonid Bartenyev | 40.9 | |
| 4 | Czechoslovakia | František Brož; Bohuslav Hlídek; Václav Janeček; František Šimánek | 40.9 | NR |
| 5 | Italy | Wolfgango Montanari; Sergio D'Asnasch; Lucio Sangermano; Luigi Gnocchi | 41.0 | |
| 6 | Sweden | Börje Andersson; Kaj Månsson; Sven Olof Westlund; Jan Carlsson | 41.3 | |

=== Heats ===
27 August

==== Heat 1 ====
| Rank | Nation | Competitors | Time | Notes |
|---|---|---|---|---|
| 1 | Soviet Union | Boris Tokarev; Viktor Ryabov; Levan Sanadze; Leonid Bartenyev | 41.0 | Q |
| 2 | Great Britain | Ken Box; George Ellis; Ken Jones; Brian Shenton | 41.0 | Q |
| 3 | Poland | Nikodem Goździalski; Wiesław Holajn; Zdobysław Stawczyk; Emil Kiszka | 41.5 | NR |
| 4 | Saar | Gert Lemmes; Werner Kiefer; Kurt Heidrich; Erich Ladwein | 42.3 | NR |

==== Heat 2 ====
| Rank | Nation | Competitors | Time | Notes |
|---|---|---|---|---|
| 1 | Czechoslovakia | František Brož; Bohuslav Hlídek; Václav Janeček; František Šimánek | 41.1 | NR Q |
| 2 | Italy | Wolfgango Montanari; Sergio D'Asnasch; Lucio Sangermano; Luigi Gnocchi | 41.2 | |
| 3 | France | René Bonino; Yves Camus; Ernest Wanko; Alain David | 41.4 | |
| 4 | Yugoslavia | Milovan Jovančić; Aleksandar Benjak; Petar Pecelj; Veljko Petrović | 42.2 | |
| | West Germany | Leonhard Pohl; Peter Kraus; Heinz Fütterer; Manfred Germar | DQ | |

==== Heat 3 ====
| Rank | Nation | Competitors | Time | Notes |
|---|---|---|---|---|
| 1 | Hungary | László Zarándi; Géza Varasdi; György Csányi; Béla Goldoványi | 40.8 | CR Q |
| 2 | Sweden | Börje Andersson; Kaj Månsson; Sven Olof Westlund; Jan Carlsson | 41.1 | NR Q |
| 3 | Netherlands | Teun Aret; Theo Saat; Hayo Rulander; Aad van Hardeveld | 41.3 | NR |
| 4 | Belgium | Jacques Vercruysse; Carlos Germonprez; Roland Vercruysse; Isidoor Vandewiele | 41.5 | NR |
| 5 | Switzerland | Joseph Huber; Willy Eichenberger; Pierfrancesco Campana; Hans Wehrli | 41.9 | |

== Participation ==
According to an unofficial count, 56 athletes from 14 countries participated in the event.

- Belgium (4)
- Czechoslovakia (4)
- France (4)
- Hungary (4)
- Italy (4)
- Netherlands (4)
- Poland (4)
- Saar (4)
- Soviet Union (4)
- Sweden (4)
- Switzerland (4)
- Great Britain (4)
- West Germany (4)
- Yugoslavia (4)
