= 1950 European Athletics Championships – Men's 200 metres =

Men's 200 metres at the 1950 European Athletics Championships
- Venue: Heysel Stadium
- Location: Brussels
- Dates: 25 August (heats); 26 August (semi-finals); 27 August (final)
- Competitors: 25 from 16 nations
- Winning time: 21.5

Medalists
gold medal	Brian Shenton	Great Britain
silver medal	Étienne Bally	France
bronze medal	Jan Lammers	Netherlands

The men's 200 metres at the 1950 European Athletics Championships was held in Brussels, Belgium, at Heysel Stadium on 25, 26 and 27 August 1950.

== Participation ==
According to an unofficial count, 25 athletes from 16 countries participated in the event.

- Belgium (2)
- Denmark (1)
- Finland (2)
- France (2)
- Great Britain (2)
- Greece (1)
- Iceland (1)
- Italy (2)
- Luxembourg (2)
- Netherlands (1)
- Norway (2)
- Portugal (1)
- Soviet Union (2)
- Sweden (1)
- Switzerland (2)
- Yugoslavia (1)

== Results ==
=== Heats ===
25 August

==== Heat 1 ====
Rank	Name	Nationality	Time	Notes
1	Étienne Bally	France	21.6	Q
2	Stig Danielsson	Sweden	22.4	Q
3	Fred Hammer	Luxembourg	22.5	
4	Jaakko Suikkari	Finland	22.7	
			Wind: +0.2 m/s	

==== Heat 2 ====
Rank	Name	Nationality	Time	Notes
1	Brian Shenton	Great Britain	21.5	Q
2	Jan Lammers	Netherlands	22.0	Q
3	Knud Schibsbye	Denmark	22.1	
4	Hector Gosset	Belgium	22.6	
			Wind: 0.0 m/s	

==== Heat 3 ====
Rank	Name	Nationality	Time	Notes
1	Mario Colarossi	Italy	22.4	Q
2	Willy Burgisser	Switzerland	22.5	Q
			Wind: 0.0 m/s	

==== Heat 4 ====
Rank	Name	Nationality	Time	Notes
1	Yves Camus	France	22.0	Q
2	Angelo Moretti	Italy	22.0	Q
3	John Gregory	Great Britain	22.1	
4	Henry Johansen	Norway	22.1	
5	Jean-Petit Hammer	Luxembourg	22.9	
			Wind: +0.7 m/s	

==== Heat 5 ====
Rank	Name	Nationality	Time	Notes
1	Petar Pecelj	Yugoslavia	22.0	Q
2	Levan Sanadze	Soviet Union	22.1	Q
3	Fernand Linssen	Belgium	22.4	
4	Knut Moum	Norway	22.6	
5	Michail Tsokalis	Greece	22.8	
			Wind: +0.2 m/s	

==== Heat 6 ====
Rank	Name	Nationality	Time	Notes
1	Vladimir Sukharev	Soviet Union	21.9	Q
2	Ásmundur Bjarnason	Iceland	22.0	Q
3	Willy Eichenberger	Switzerland	22.7	
4	Tomas Paquete	Portugal	23.1	
5	Lennart Lindberg	Finland	23.3	
			Wind: -0.3 m/s	

=== Semi-finals ===
26 August

==== Heat 1 ====
Rank	Name	Nationality	Time	Notes
1	Étienne Bally	France	21.9	Q
2	Angelo Moretti	Italy	21.9	Q
3	Jan Lammers	Netherlands	22.0	Q
4	Levan Sanadze	Soviet Union	22.0	
5	Mario Colarossi	Italy	22.0	
6	Stig Danielsson	Sweden	22.1	
			Wind: +0.6 m/s	

==== Heat 2 ====
Rank	Name	Nationality	Time	Notes
1	Brian Shenton	Great Britain	21.5	Q
2	Yves Camus	France	21.7	Q
3	Ásmundur Bjarnason	Iceland	21.9	Q
4	Vladimir Sukharev	Soviet Union	21.9	
5	Petar Pecelj	Yugoslavia	22.0	
6	Willy Burgisser	Switzerland	22.6	
			Wind: -0.5 m/s	

=== Final ===
27 August

Rank	Name	Nationality	Time	Notes
1st place, gold medalist(s)	Brian Shenton	Great Britain	21.5	
2nd place, silver medalist(s)	Étienne Bally	France	21.8	
3rd place, bronze medalist(s)	Jan Lammers	Netherlands	22.1	
4	Angelo Moretti	Italy	22.1	
5	Ásmundur Bjarnason	Iceland	22.1	
6	Yves Camus	France	22.2	
			Wind: -0.6 m/s	
