= 1954 European Athletics Championships – Men's 100 metres =

Men's 100 metres at the 1954 European Athletics Championships
- Venue: Stadion Neufeld
- Location: Bern
- Dates: 25 August (heats); 26 August (semifinals & final)
- Competitors: 35 from 20 nations
- Winning time: 10.5

Medalists
gold medal	Heinz Fütterer	West Germany
silver medal	René Bonino	France
bronze medal	George Ellis	Great Britain

The men's 100 metres at the 1954 European Athletics Championships was held in Bern, Switzerland, at Stadion Neufeld on 25 and 26 August 1954.

== Participation ==
According to an unofficial count, 35 athletes from 20 countries participated in the event.

- Austria (1)
- Belgium (2)
- Bulgaria (2)
- Czechoslovakia (1)
- France (2)
- Greece (1)
- Hungary (2)
- Iceland (2)
- Netherlands (2)
- Poland (2)
- Portugal (1)
- Romania (2)
- Saar (2)
- Soviet Union (2)
- Sweden (1)
- Switzerland (2)
- Turkey (2)
- Great Britain (2)
- West Germany (2)
- Yugoslavia (2)

== Results ==
=== Heats ===
25 August

==== Heat 1 ====
Rank	Name	Nationality	Time	Notes
1	George Ellis	Great Britain	10.9	Q
2	Jan Carlsson	Sweden	10.9	Q
3	Angel Kolev	Bulgaria	10.9	
4	Kurt Heidrich	Saar	11.2	
5	József Senkei	Hungary	11.2	

==== Heat 2 ====
Rank	Name	Nationality	Time	Notes
1	Heinz Fütterer	West Germany	10.7	Q
2	Jacques Derderian	France	11.0	Q
3	Nikolaos Georgopoulos	Greece	11.0	
4	Aleksandar Benjak	Yugoslavia	11.1	
	Nikodem Goździalski	Poland	DQ	

==== Heat 3 ====
Rank	Name	Nationality	Time	Notes
1	Leonhard Pohl	West Germany	10.8	Q
2	Ken Jones	Great Britain	10.9	Q
3	Levan Sanadze	Soviet Union	11.0	
4	Jacques Vercruysse	Belgium	11.1	

==== Heat 4 ====
Rank	Name	Nationality	Time	Notes
1	Theo Saat	Netherlands	10.9	Q
2	Ilarie Magdas	Romania	11.0	Q
	Gert Lemmes	Saar	DQ	

==== Heat 5 ====
Rank	Name	Nationality	Time	Notes
1	László Zarándi	Hungary	10.8	Q
2	Hayo Rulander	Netherlands	11.0	Q
3	Roland Vercruysse	Belgium	11.2	
4	Angel Gavrilov	Bulgaria	11.2	
5	Tomas Paquete	Portugal	11.2	

==== Heat 6 ====
Rank	Name	Nationality	Time	Notes
1	René Bonino	France	10.8	Q
2	Hans Wehrli	Switzerland	10.9	Q
3	Guðmundur Vilhjálmsson	Iceland	11.2	
4	Alexandru Stoenescu	Romania	11.2	

==== Heat 7 ====
Rank	Name	Nationality	Time	Notes
1	Zdobysław Stawczyk	Poland	11.0	Q
2	Viktor Ryabov	Soviet Union	11.0	Q
3	Josef Wimmer	Austria	11.1	
	Muzaffer Selvi	Turkey	DQ	

==== Heat 8 ====
Rank	Name	Nationality	Time	Notes
1	Václav Janeček	Czechoslovakia	11.0	Q
2	Ásmundur Bjarnason	Iceland	11.1	Q
3	Milovan Jovančić	Yugoslavia	11.2	
4	Joseph Huber	Switzerland	11.3	
5	Todori Yordanidis	Turkey	11.5	

=== Semi-finals ===
26 August

==== Semi-final 1 ====
Rank	Name	Nationality	Time	Notes
1	Heinz Fütterer	West Germany	10.5	Q
2	Jan Carlsson	Sweden	10.7	Q
3	Hayo Rulander	Netherlands	10.7	
4	Ken Jones	Great Britain	10.7	
5	Ásmundur Bjarnason	Iceland	10.9	
	Jacques Derderian	France	DNS	

==== Semi-final 2 ====
Rank	Name	Nationality	Time	Notes
1	Leonhard Pohl	West Germany	10.7	Q
2	George Ellis	Great Britain	10.7	Q
3	Viktor Ryabov	Soviet Union	10.7	
4	Hans Wehrli	Switzerland	10.7	
5	Ilarie Magdas	Romania	10.9	

==== Semi-final 3 ====
Rank	Name	Nationality	Time	Notes
1	René Bonino	France	10.7	Q
2	Theo Saat	Netherlands	10.8	Q
3	László Zarándi	Hungary	10.9	
4	Václav Janeček	Czechoslovakia	10.9	
5	Zdobysław Stawczyk	Poland	11.0	

=== Final ===
26 August

Rank	Name	Nationality	Time	Notes
1st place, gold medalist(s)	Heinz Fütterer	West Germany	10.5	
2nd place, silver medalist(s)	René Bonino	France	10.6	
3rd place, bronze medalist(s)	George Ellis	Great Britain	10.7	
4	Leonhard Pohl	West Germany	10.7	
5	Jan Carlsson	Sweden	10.7	
6	Theo Saat	Netherlands	11.1	
