= 1954 European Athletics Championships – Men's 200 metres =

Men's 200 metres at the 1954 European Athletics Championships
- Venue: Stadion Neufeld
- Location: Bern
- Dates: 28 August (heats & semi-finals); 29 August (final)
- Competitors: 30 from 18 nations
- Winning time: 20.9

Medalists
gold medal	Heinz Fütterer	West Germany
silver medal	Ardalion Ignatyev	Soviet Union
bronze medal	George Ellis	Great Britain

The men's 200 metres at the 1954 European Athletics Championships was held in Bern, Switzerland, at Stadion Neufeld on 28 and 29 August 1954.

== Participation ==
According to an unofficial count, 30 athletes from 18 countries participated in the event.

- Austria (1)
- Belgium (2)
- Bulgaria (2)
- Czechoslovakia (1)
- France (2)
- Great Britain (2)
- Greece (1)
- Hungary (1)
- Iceland (1)
- Netherlands (2)
- Poland (1)
- Romania (2)
- Saar (2)
- Soviet Union (2)
- Sweden (2)
- Switzerland (2)
- Turkey (2)
- West Germany (2)

== Results ==
=== Heats ===
28 August

==== Heat 1 ====
Rank	Name	Nationality	Time	Notes
1	George Ellis	Great Britain	21.3	Q
2	Jan Carlsson	Sweden	21.3	Q, NR
3	Zdobysław Stawczyk	Poland	21.5	
4	Gert Lemmes	Saar	22.0	
5	Todori Yordanidis	Turkey	22.5	

==== Heat 2 ====
Rank	Name	Nationality	Time	Notes
1	Ardalion Ignatyev	Soviet Union	21.5	Q
2	Ilarie Magdas	Romania	21.9	Q
3	Kaj Månsson	Sweden	21.9	
4	Angel Gavrilov	Bulgaria	22.3	
5	Kurt Heidrich	Saar	22.5	
	Leonhard Pohl	West Germany	DQ	

==== Heat 3 ====
Rank	Name	Nationality	Time	Notes
1	Heinz Fütterer	West Germany	21.4	Q
2	Aad van Hardeveld	Netherlands	21.6	Q
3	Carlos Germonprez	Belgium	22.0	
4	Josef Wimmer	Austria	22.1	

==== Heat 4 ====
Rank	Name	Nationality	Time	Notes
1	Brian Shenton	Great Britain	21.6	Q
2	Yuriy Konovalov	Soviet Union	21.8	Q
3	Angel Kolev	Bulgaria	21.9	
4	Nikolaos Georgopoulos	Greece	22.2	
5	Daniel Meneux	France	22.3	
6	Muzaffer Selvi	Turkey	22.5	

==== Heat 5 ====
Rank	Name	Nationality	Time	Notes
1	Ásmundur Bjarnason	Iceland	21.7	Q
2	Václav Janeček	Czechoslovakia	21.7	Q
3	József Senkei	Hungary	22.0	
4	Jacques Vercruysse	Belgium	22.0	
5	Pierre Coelembier	France	22.1	
6	Willy Eichenberger	Switzerland	22.4	

==== Heat 6 ====
Rank	Name	Nationality	Time	Notes
1	Theo Saat	Netherlands	21.8	Q
2	Hans Wehrli	Switzerland	21.9	Q
3	Alexandru Stoenescu	Romania	22.4	

=== Semi-finals ===
28 August

==== Heat 1 ====
Rank	Name	Nationality	Time	Notes
1	George Ellis	Great Britain	21.3	Q
2	Ardalion Ignatyev	Soviet Union	21.3	Q
3	Václav Janeček	Czechoslovakia	21.4	Q
4	Aad van Hardeveld	Netherlands	21.4	
5	Hans Wehrli	Switzerland	21.6	
6	Ilarie Magdas	Romania	21.8	

==== Heat 2 ====
Rank	Name	Nationality	Time	Notes
1	Heinz Fütterer	West Germany	21.1	Q, CR
2	Jan Carlsson	Sweden	21.4	Q
3	Brian Shenton	Great Britain	21.4	Q
4	Ásmundur Bjarnason	Iceland	21.6	
5	Yuriy Konovalov	Soviet Union	21.7	
6	Theo Saat	Netherlands	22.1	

=== Final ===
29 August

Rank	Name	Nationality	Time	Notes
1st place, gold medalist(s)	Heinz Fütterer	West Germany	20.9	CR, AR
2nd place, silver medalist(s)	Ardalion Ignatyev	Soviet Union	21.1	NR
3rd place, bronze medalist(s)	George Ellis	Great Britain	21.2	NR
4	Brian Shenton	Great Britain	21.3	
5	Jan Carlsson	Sweden	21.5	
6	Václav Janeček	Czechoslovakia	21.9	
			Wind: +0.1 m/s	
