= 1950 European Athletics Championships – Men's 4 × 100 metres relay =

Men's 4 × 100 metres relay at the European Athletics Championships

The men's 4 × 100 metres relay at the 1950 European Athletics Championships was held in Brussels, Belgium, at Heysel Stadium on 23 and 27 August 1950.

== Medalists ==
Gold	Vladimir Sukharev; Levan Kalyayev; Levan Sanadze; Nikolay Karakulov; Soviet Union
Silver	Étienne Bally; Jacques Perlot; Yves Camus; Jean-Pierre Guillon; France
Bronze	Göte Kjellberg; Leif Christersson; Stig Danielsson; Hans Rydén; Sweden

== Results ==
=== Final ===
27 August

Rank	Nation	Competitors	Time	Notes
1st place, gold medalist(s)	Soviet Union	Vladimir Sukharev; Levan Kalyayev; Levan Sanadze; Nikolay Karakulov	41.5	
2nd place, silver medalist(s)	France	Étienne Bally; Jacques Perlot; Yves Camus; Jean-Pierre Guillon	41.8	
3rd place, bronze medalist(s)	Sweden	Göte Kjellberg; Leif Christersson; Stig Danielsson; Hans Rydén	41.9	
4	Great Britain	John Gregory; Alan Grieve; Brian Shenton; Austin Pinnington	41.9	
5	Iceland	Ásmundur Bjarnason; Guðmundur Lárusson; Finnbjörn Þorvaldsson; Haukur Clausen	41.9	
6	Italy	Franco Leccese; Gino Riva; Giuseppe Guzzi; Angelo Moretti	43.2	

=== Heats ===
23 August

==== Heat 1 ====
Rank	Nation	Competitors	Time	Notes
1	Soviet Union	Vladimir Sukharev; Levan Kalyayev; Levan Sanadze; Nikolay Karakulov	41.7	Q
2	Iceland	Ásmundur Bjarnason; Guðmundur Lárusson; Finnbjörn Þorvaldsson; Haukur Clausen	41.7	NR Q
3	Great Britain	John Gregory; Alan Grieve; Brian Shenton; Austin Pinnington	41.9	Q
4	Belgium	Hector Gosset; Fernand Linssen; Isidoor Vandewiele; Roland Vercruysse	42.2	

==== Heat 2 ====
Rank	Nation	Competitors	Time	Notes
1	France	Étienne Bally; Jacques Perlot; Yves Camus; Jean-Pierre Guillon	41.4	Q
2	Italy	Franco Leccese; Gino Riva; Giuseppe Guzzi; Angelo Moretti	41.5	Q
3	Sweden	Göte Kjellberg; Leif Christersson; Stig Danielsson; Hans Rydén	42.1	Q
4	Norway	Erik Bjølseth; Henry Johansen; Knut Moum; Hans Peter Pedersen	42.5	
5	Switzerland	Olivier Bernard; Hans Wehrli; Willy Eichenberger; Willy Burgisser	43.7	

== Participation ==
According to an unofficial count, 36 athletes from 9 countries participated in the event.

- Belgium (4)
- France (4)
- Iceland (4)
- Italy (4)
- Norway (4)
- Soviet Union (4)
- Sweden (4)
- Switzerland (4)
- Great Britain (4)
