= Iceland at the 1952 Summer Olympics =

- IOC code: ISL
- NOC: Olympic Committee of Iceland

in Helsinki
- Competitors: 9 in 1 sport
- Flag bearer: Friðrik Guðmundsson
- Medals: Gold 0 Silver 0 Bronze 0 Total 0

Summer Olympics appearances (overview)
- 1908; 1912; 1920–1932; 1936; 1948; 1952; 1956; 1960; 1964; 1968; 1972; 1976; 1980; 1984; 1988; 1992; 1996; 2000; 2004; 2008; 2012; 2016; 2020; 2024; 2028

Iceland competed at the 1952 Summer Olympics in Helsinki, Finland.

== Results by event ==
=== Athletics ===
Key

- Note – Ranks given for track events are within the athlete's heat only
- Q = Qualified for the next round
- q = Qualified for the next round as a fastest loser or, in field events, by position without achieving the qualifying target
- NR = National record
- N/A = Round not applicable for the event
- Bye = Athlete not required to compete in round

Men
Track & road events

Athlete	Event	Heat		Quarterfinals		Semifinal		Final	
Athlete	Event	Result	Rank	Result	Rank	Result	Rank	Result	Rank
Ásmundur Bjarnason	100 m	11.40	5	did not advance					
Ásmundur Bjarnason	200 m	22.51	4	did not advance					
Hörður Haraldsson	100 m	11.31	4	did not advance					
Hörður Haraldsson	200 m	22.56	4	did not advance					
Pétur Sigurðsson	100 m	11.55	5	did not advance					
Guðmundur Lárusson	400 m	49.81	4	did not advance					
Guðmundur Lárusson	800 m	1:56.5	7	—N/a		did not advance			
Kristján Jóhannsson	5000 m	15:23.8	14	—N/a				did not advance	
Kristján Jóhannsson	10000 m	—N/a						32:00.0	26
Ingi Þorsteinsson	110 m hurdles	15.6	4	—N/a		did not advance			
Ingi Þorsteinsson	400 m hurdles	56.5	5	did not advance					
Ásmundur Bjarnason; Hörður Haraldsson; Pétur Sigurðsson; Ingi Þorsteinsson	4 × 100 m relay	DSQ		—N/a		did not advance			

Field events

Athlete	Event	Qualification		Final	
Athlete	Event	Distance	Position	Distance	Position
Torfi Bryngeirsson	pole vault	4.00	16	3.95	14
Friðrik Guðmundsson	discus throw	44.73	22	did not advance	
Þorsteinn Löve	discus throw	44.28	24	did not advance	
