= Athletics at the 1952 Summer Olympics – Men's 100 metres =

Men's 100 metres at the Games of the XV Olympiad
- Venue: Olympic Stadium; Helsinki, Finland
- Dates: 20 July 1952 (heats, quarterfinals); 21 July 1952 (semifinals, final)
- Competitors: 72 from 33 nations
- Winning time: 10.4 seconds (hand); 10.79 seconds (auto)

Medalists
1st place, gold medalist(s)		Lindy Remigino	United States
2nd place, silver medalist(s)		Herb McKenley	Jamaica
3rd place, bronze medalist(s)		McDonald Bailey	Great Britain

The men's 100 metres sprint event at the 1952 Olympic Games in Helsinki, Finland was held at the Olympic Stadium on 20 and 21 July. Seventy-two athletes from 33 nations competed; each nation was limited to 3 runners. The final was won by American Lindy Remigino, the fourth consecutive victory by a different American. Herb McKenley won Jamaica's first medal in the men's 100 metres with his silver, while McDonald Bailey's bronze put Great Britain on the podium for the first time since 1928. The final was "probably the closest mass finish in Olympic 100 metre history" with the first four runners all clocking in at 10.4 seconds hand-timed, all six finalists within 0.12 seconds electric-timed (10.79 for first, 10.91 for sixth), and a photo finish necessary to separate the winners.

== Background ==
This was the twelfth time the event was held, having appeared at every Olympics since the first in 1896. None of the medalists from 1948 returned, but sixth-place finisher McDonald Bailey (who had recently tied the world record) did. London bronze medalist Lloyd LaBeach's brother Byron LaBeach represented Jamaica. Other notable entrants were American Art Bragg (who pulled his hamstring before the semifinal) and Jamaican Herb McKenley, who were favorites along with Bailey.

Bulgaria, Ghana, Guatemala, Israel, Nigeria, the Soviet Union, Thailand, and Venezuela were represented in the event for the first time. The United States was the only nation to have appeared at each of the first twelve Olympic men's 100 metres events.

== Competition format ==
The event retained the four round format from 1920 to 1948: heats, quarterfinals, semifinals, and a final. There were 12 heats, of 4–7 athletes each, with the top 2 in each heat advancing to the quarterfinals. The 24 quarterfinalists were placed into 4 heats of 6 athletes. The top 3 in each quarterfinal advanced to the semifinals. There were 2 heats of 6 semifinalists, once again with the top 3 advancing to the 6-man final.

== Records ==
Prior to the competition, the existing World and Olympic records were as follows.

World record	10.2	(United States) Jesse Owens	Chicago, United States	20 June 1936
World record	10.2	(United States) Harold Davis	Compton, United States	6 June 1941
World record	10.2	(Panama) Lloyd LaBeach	Fresno, United States	15 May 1948
World record	10.2	(United States) Barney Ewell	Evanston, United States	9 July 1948
World record	10.2	(United Kingdom) McDonald Bailey	Belgrade, Yugoslavia	25 August 1951
Olympic record	10.3	(United States) Eddie Tolan	Los Angeles, USA	1 August 1932
Olympic record	10.3	(United States) Ralph Metcalfe	Los Angeles, USA	1 August 1932
Olympic record	10.3	(United States) Jesse Owens	Berlin, Germany	2 August 1936
Olympic record	10.3	(United States) Harrison Dillard	London, United Kingdom	31 July 1948

== Results ==
=== Heats ===
The fastest two runners in each of the twelve heats advanced to the quarterfinal round.

==== Heat 1 ====
Rank	Athlete	Nation	Time	Notes
1	John Treloar	Australia	10.92	Q
2	Alan Lillington	Great Britain	11.06	Q
3	Gabriel Lareya	Ghana	11.18	
4	Miroslav Horčic	Czechoslovakia	11.23	
5	Ásmundur Bjarnason	Iceland	11.40	
6	Youssef Ali Omar	Egypt	11.53	
7	José Julio Barillas	Guatemala	11.56	

==== Heat 2 ====
Rank	Athlete	Nation	Time	Notes
1	Étienne Bally	France	10.97	Q
2	Angel Kolev	Bulgaria	11.01	Q
3	Paul Dolan	Ireland	11.12	
4	Raúl Mazorra	Cuba	11.19	
5	Robert Hutchinson	Canada	11.26	
6	Masaji Tajima	Japan	11.29	
7	Adul Wanasatith	Thailand	11.61	

==== Heat 3 ====
Rank	Athlete	Nation	Time	Notes
1	McDonald Bailey	Great Britain	10.65	Q
2	Carlo Vittori	Italy	10.98	Q
3	Mikhail Kazantsev	Soviet Union	11.16	
4	Hörður Haraldsson	Iceland	11.31	
5	Javier Souza	Mexico	11.32	
6	Stefanos Petrakis	Greece	11.33	
-	Ray Weinberg	Australia	DNS	

==== Heat 4 ====
Rank	Athlete	Nation	Time	Notes
1	William Jack	Great Britain	11.05	Q
2	Romeo Galán	Argentina	11.11	Q
3	Levan Sanadze	Soviet Union	11.13	
4	Emad El-Din Shafei	Egypt	11.40	
5	Guillermo Gutiérrez	Venezuela	11.42	
6	Boonterm Pakpuang	Thailand	11.85	
-	Heinz Fütterer	Germany	DNS	

==== Heat 5 ====
Rank	Athlete	Nation	Time	Notes
1	Herb McKenley	Jamaica	10.88	Q
2	György Csányi	Hungary	11.09	Q
3	Emil Kiszka	Poland	11.13	
4	Pauli Tavisalo	Finland	11.30	
5	Tomás Paquete	Portugal	11.45	
6	Walter Sutton	Canada	11.45	
-	Noel Flanagan	Ireland	DNS	

==== Heat 6 ====
Rank	Athlete	Nation	Time	Notes
1	David Tabak	Israel	11.12	Q
2	Tomio Hosoda	Japan	11.14	Q
3	Willy Schneider	Switzerland	11.22	
4	Angel Gavrilov	Bulgaria	11.29	
5	Juan Leiva	Venezuela	11.31	
-	Les Laing	Jamaica	DNS	

==== Heat 7 ====
Rank	Athlete	Nation	Time	Notes
1	Vladimir Sukharev	Soviet Union	10.93	Q
2	Theo Saat	Netherlands	11.02	Q
3	Muhammad Sharif Butt	Pakistan	11.17	
4	Voitto Hellstén	Finland	11.36	
5	George Acquaah	Ghana	11.47	
6	Mariano Acosta	Argentina	11.58	
7	Wolfango Montanari	Italy	12.25	

==== Heat 8 ====
Rank	Athlete	Nation	Time	Notes
1	Rafael Fortún	Cuba	10.93	Q
2	Byron LaBeach	Jamaica	11.09	Q
3	Franco Leccese	Italy	11.18	
4	Issi Baran	Finland	11.32	
5	Fritz Griesser	Switzerland	11.54	
-	K. K. Korsah	Ghana	DNS	
-	Morris Curotta	Australia	DNS	

==== Heat 9 ====
Rank	Athlete	Nation	Time	Notes
1	Werner Zandt	Germany	11.03	Q
2	Muhammad Aslam	Pakistan	11.18	Q
3	Don McFarlane	Canada	11.25	
4	Zdeněk Pospíšil	Czechoslovakia	11.25	
5	Edward Ajado	Nigeria	11.25	
6	Fawzi Chaaban	Egypt	11.51	
-	Enrique Beckles	Argentina	DQ	
-	Bo Åhlen	Sweden	DNS	

==== Heat 10 ====
Rank	Athlete	Nation	Time	Notes
1	Art Bragg	United States	10.73	Q
2	Hans Wehrli	Switzerland	11.00	Q
3	Titus Erinle	Nigeria	11.12	
4	László Zarándi	Hungary	11.26	
5	Pétur Sigurðsson	Iceland	11.55	
6	Arun Sankosik	Thailand	11.76	
-	Radovan Pejin	Yugoslavia	DNS	

==== Heat 11 ====
Rank	Athlete	Nation	Time	Notes
1	Lindy Remigino	United States	10.73	Q
2	Lavy Pinto	India	11.00	Q
3	René Bonino	France	11.00	
4	František Brož	Czechoslovakia	11.32	
5	Abdul Aziz	Pakistan	11.48	
6	Rui Maia	Portugal	11.79	

==== Heat 12 ====
Rank	Athlete	Nation	Time	Notes
1	Dean Smith	United States	10.90	Q
2	Alain Porthault	France	11.04	Q
3	Erich Fuchs	Germany	11.19	
4	Karim Olowu	Nigeria	11.27	
-	Louis Crowe	Ireland	DNS	
-	Roy Fearon	Guatemala	DNS	
-	Neville Price	South Africa	DNS	

=== Quarterfinals ===
The fastest three runners in each of the four heats advanced to the semifinal round.

==== Quarterfinal 1 ====
Rank	Athlete	Nation	Time	Notes
1	McDonald Bailey	Great Britain	10.73	Q
2	John Treloar	Australia	10.84	Q
3	Alain Porthault	France	10.99	Q
4	Muhammad Aslam	Pakistan	11.02	
5	Byron LaBeach	Jamaica	11.05	
-	Angel Kolev	Bulgaria	DSQ	

==== Quarterfinal 2 ====
Rank	Athlete	Nation	Time	Notes
1	Lindy Remigino	United States	10.68	Q
2	Theo Saat	Netherlands	10.93	Q
3	Lavy Pinto	India	10.98	Q
4	Étienne Bally	France	10.98	
5	Hans Wehrli	Switzerland	11.05	
6	Alan Lillington	Great Britain	11.26	

==== Quarterfinal 3 ====
Rank	Athlete	Nation	Time	Notes
1	Dean Smith	United States	10.69	Q
2	Rafael Fortún	Cuba	10.90	Q
3	William Jack	Great Britain	10.94	Q
4	Werner Zandt	Germany	10.98	
5	Romeo Galán	Argentina	11.08	
6	David Tabak	Israel	11.10	

==== Quarterfinal 4 ====
Rank	Athlete	Nation	Time	Notes
1	Herb McKenley	Jamaica	10.72	Q
2	Art Bragg	United States	10.75	Q
3	Vladimir Sukharev	Soviet Union	10.92	Q
4	Tomio Hosoda	Japan	11.03	
5	György Csányi	Hungary	11.07	
6	Carlo Vittori	Italy	11.79	

=== Semifinals ===
The fastest three runners in each of the two heats advanced to the final round.

==== Semifinal 1 ====
Bragg tore a muscle in this semifinal.

Rank	Athlete	Nation	Time	Notes
1	McDonald Bailey	Great Britain	10.74	Q
2	Dean Smith	United States	10.78	Q
3	Vladimir Sukharev	Soviet Union	10.86	Q
4	Lavy Pinto	India	10.94	
5	Alain Porthault	France	11.04	
6	Art Bragg	United States	11.43	

==== Semifinal 2 ====
Rank	Athlete	Nation	Time	Notes
1	Herb McKenley	Jamaica	10.74	Q
2	Lindy Remigino	United States	10.74	Q
3	John Treloar	Australia	10.76	Q
4	Rafael Fortún	Cuba	10.92	
5	William Jack	Great Britain	11.01	
6	Theo Saat	Netherlands	11.12	

=== Final ===
Rank	Athlete	Nation	Time	Notes
1st place, gold medalist(s)	Lindy Remigino	United States	10.79	Photo-determined finish
2nd place, silver medalist(s)	Herb McKenley	Jamaica	10.80	
3rd place, bronze medalist(s)	McDonald Bailey	Great Britain	10.83	
4	Dean Smith	United States	10.84	
5	Vladimir Sukharev	Soviet Union	10.88	
6	John Treloar	Australia	10.91	
