= 1950 European Athletics Championships – Men's 100 metres =

Men's 100 metres at the 1950 European Athletics Championships
- Venue: Heysel Stadium
- Location: Brussels
- Dates: 23 August (heats); 24 August (semifinals & final)
- Competitors: 26 from 16 nations
- Winning time: 10.7

Medalists
gold medal	Étienne Bally	France
silver medal	Franco Leccese	Italy
bronze medal	Vladimir Sukharev	Soviet Union

The men's 100 metres at the 1950 European Athletics Championships was held in Brussels, Belgium, at Heysel Stadium on 23 and 24 August 1950.

== Participation ==
According to an unofficial count, 26 athletes from 16 countries participated in the event.

- Belgium (2)
- Denmark (1)
- France (2)
- Greece (1)
- Iceland (2)
- Italy (2)
- Luxembourg (2)
- Netherlands (1)
- Norway (2)
- Poland (1)
- Portugal (1)
- Soviet Union (2)
- Sweden (2)
- Switzerland (2)
- Great Britain (2)
- Yugoslavia (1)

== Results ==
=== Heats ===
23 August

==== Heat 1 ====
Rank	Name	Nationality	Time	Notes
1	Nikolay Karakulov	Soviet Union	11.1	Q
2	Hans Peter Pedersen	Norway	11.2	Q
			Wind: 0.0 m/s	

==== Heat 2 ====
Rank	Name	Nationality	Time	Notes
1	Petar Pecelj	Yugoslavia	11.0	Q
2	Emil Kiszka	Poland	11.1	Q
3	Tomas Paquete	Portugal	11.1	
4	Hans Wehrli	Switzerland	11.1	
5	Fred Hammer	Luxembourg	11.2	
			Wind: -0.1 m/s	

==== Heat 3 ====
Rank	Name	Nationality	Time	Notes
1	Franco Leccese	Italy	10.6	Q
2	Alan Grieve	Great Britain	10.8	Q
3	Henry Johansen	Norway	11.0	
4	Christian Brac	France	11.2	
5	Leif Christersson	Sweden	11.2	
			Wind: -0.1 m/s	

==== Heat 4 ====
Rank	Name	Nationality	Time	Notes
1	Knud Schibsbye	Denmark	11.1	Q
2	Gesualdo Penna	Italy	11.2	Q
3	Austin Pinnington	Great Britain	11.2	
4	Jan Lammers	Netherlands	11.3	
5	Hans Rydén	Sweden	11.3	
			Wind: -0.1 m/s	

==== Heat 5 ====
Rank	Name	Nationality	Time	Notes
1	Étienne Bally	France	10.9	Q
2	Finnbjörn Þorvaldsson	Iceland	11.1	Q
3	Roland Vercruysse	Belgium	11.1	
4	Michail Tsokalis	Greece	11.4	
5	Willy Eichenberger	Switzerland	11.6	
			Wind: -1.3 m/s	

==== Heat 6 ====
Rank	Name	Nationality	Time	Notes
1	Vladimir Sukharev	Soviet Union	10.7	Q
2	Haukur Clausen	Iceland	11.0	Q
3	Isidoor Vandewiele	Belgium	11.1	
4	Jean-Petit Hammer	Luxembourg	11.3	
			Wind: -0.4 m/s	

=== Semi-finals ===
24 August

==== Semi-final 1 ====
Rank	Name	Nationality	Time	Notes
1	Franco Leccese	Italy	10.7	Q
2	Emil Kiszka	Poland	10.8	Q
3	Petar Pecelj	Yugoslavia	11.0	Q
4	Nikolay Karakulov	Soviet Union	11.1	
5	Knud Schibsbye	Denmark	11.1	
6	Finnbjörn Þorvaldsson	Iceland	11.1	
			Wind: -0.2 m/s	

==== Semi-final 2 ====
Rank	Name	Nationality	Time	Notes
1	Étienne Bally	France	10.6	Q
2	Vladimir Sukharev	Soviet Union	10.7	Q
3	Haukur Clausen	Iceland	11.0	Q
4	Alan Grieve	Great Britain	11.0	
5	Gesualdo Penna	Italy	11.0	
6	Hans Peter Pedersen	Norway	11.2	
			Wind: +0.4 m/s	

=== Final ===
24 August

Rank	Name	Nationality	Time	Notes
1st place, gold medalist(s)	Étienne Bally	France	10.7	
2nd place, silver medalist(s)	Franco Leccese	Italy	10.7	
3rd place, bronze medalist(s)	Vladimir Sukharev	Soviet Union	10.7	
4	Emil Kiszka	Poland	10.7	
5	Haukur Clausen	Iceland	10.8	
6	Petar Pecelj	Yugoslavia	10.8	
			Wind: +0.7 m/s	
