= Griesser =

Griesser is a surname. Notable people with the surname include:

- Fritz Griesser (1929–2013), Swiss sprinter
- Thomas Griesser (born 1967), Austrian sprinter
- Winslow W. Griesser (1856–1931), station keeper in the United States Lifesaving Service

== See also ==
- 11547 Griesser, a main-belt asteroid
