= Gabriel Laryea =

Ghanaian sprinter (1924–2009)

Personal information
- Full name: Gabriel Sowah Laryea
- Nationality: Ghanaian
- Born: 29 January 1924
- Died: 23 June 2009 (aged 85)

Sport
- Sport: Athletics

Gabriel Sowah Laryea (29 January 1924 – 23 June 2009) was a Ghanaian sprinter. He would start the sport in 1944 and would become the highest ranked sprinter in his nation during the 1950s. During his career, he would compete at the 1952 Summer Olympics. There, he would compete in the men's 100 metres and men's 4 × 100 metres relay alongside his teammates, but would not advance past the heats.

After the 1952 Summer Games, he would be named vice-captain for the Gold Coaster delegation at the 1954 British Empire and Commonwealth Games. He would be hampered by illness, eventually leading to his retirement in 1958. Later on, he would hold multiple administrative positions in Ghanaian sport and helped found a stadium. After his death in 2009, he would receive posthumous honours such as a street being named after him.

== Biography ==
Gabriel Sowah Laryea was born on 29 January 1924. Laryea would start athletics in 1944 and would become the highest ranked Ghanaian sprinter during the 1950s. At the time, he would compete for in what was then the Gold Coast at the 1952 Summer Olympics in Helsinki, Finland.

Laryea would first compete in the heats of the men's 100 metres on 20 July. He would compete against six other athletes and place third in the round with a time of 11.18 seconds; he would not advance further. Six days later, he would be part of the Gold Coaster men's 4 × 100 metres relay team with George Acquaah, John Owusu, and Augustus Lawson. In their heat, they would compete against five other relay teams and place fourth with a time of 42.1 seconds. They would not advance to the semifinals the following day.

Laryea would then compete at the 1954 British Empire and Commonwealth Games in Vancouver and was designated as the vice-captain, though would have poor results due to an illness. The illness would last and would lead him to permanent retirement in 1958. Later on, he would hold administrative positions in Ghanaian sport and helped found the Accra Sports Stadium. He would later die on 23 June 2009 and would receive posthumous honours. An athletic award named the G.S Laryea Award, a sports tournament named the G.S Laryea Memorial Cup, and a street in Accra would be named after him.
