= Sanadze =

Sanadze (Georgian: სანაძე) is a Georgian surname. Notable people with the surname include:

- Duda Sanadze (born 1992), Georgian basketball player
- Levan Sanadze (1928–1998), Georgian sprinter
- Guivi Sanadze (born 1929), Georgian biologist
