= Mohammad Fazel =

Mohammad Fazel is the name of:

- Mohammad Fazl (born 1967), a Taliban leader held for over nine years in the Guantanamo Bay detention camps
- Mohammed Fazal (1922–2014), Governor of Maharashtra from October 10, 2002, to December 5, 2004
- Mohammad Fazal (footballer, born 2002), Pakistani professional footballer
- Mohamed Said Fazul (born 1960), president of the Comorian island of Mohéli, 2002–2007
- Muhammad Fazil, Pakistani sprinter
