= Kalyayev =

Kalyayev (Russian: Каляев) is a Russian masculine surname, its feminine counterpart is Kalyayeva. Notable people with the surname include:

- Ivan Kalyayev (1877–1905), Russian poet and revolutionary
- Levan Kalyayev (1929–1983), Soviet sprinter
