= Pétur Sigurðsson =

Pétur Sigurðsson is the name of:

- Pétur Sigurðsson (athlete) (1928–2002), Icelandic Olympic sprinter
- Pétur Sigurðsson (1911–1998), former director of the Icelandic Coast Guard
- Pétur Sigurðsson (1928–1996), Icelandic Independence Party Party Member of Alþingi
- Pétur Már Sigurðsson (born 1978), Icelandic basketball player and coach
