= Alan Lillington =

British sprinter (born 1932)

Personal information
- Nationality: British (English)
- Born: 4 September 1932 (age 93) South Shields, England

Sport
- Sport: Athletics
- Event: Sprinting
- Club: Durham University AC; Elswick Harriers

Alan William Lillington MBE (born 4 September 1932) is a British sprinter who competed at the 1952 Summer Olympics.

== Biography ==
Lillington attended Heaton Grammar School and studied medicine at Durham University.

Lillington finished second behind McDonald Bailey in the 100 metres event at the 1952 AAA Championships. Shortly afterwards he represented the Great Britain team at the 1952 Olympic Games in Helsinki, where he participated in the men's 100 metres.

Lillington represented England in the sprint disciplines at the 1954 British Empire and Commonwealth Games in Vancouver, Canada.

He later became a consultant paediatrician in Sunderland and was awarded the MBE IN 1995. He is the father of former rugby player Peter Lillington.

== Competition record ==
Year	Competition	Venue	Position	Event	Notes
Representing Great Britain
1952	Olympics	Helsinki, Finland	6th, Qtr 2	100 m	11.26/10.9
