= Athletics at the 1957 World University Games – Men's 4 × 100 metres relay =

The men's 4 × 100 metres relay event at the 1957 World University Games was held at the Stadium Charlety in Paris with the final on 8 September 1957.

== Results ==
=== Heats ===
Rank	Heat	Nation	Athletes	Time	Notes
1	1	France		42.0	Q
2	1	Soviet Union		42.1	Q
3	1	Poland		42.5	Q
4	1	Japan		43.3	
5	1	Brazil		43.4	
1	2	Italy		42.0	Q
2	2	West Germany		42.8	Q
3	2	Romania		42.9	Q
4	2	Hungary		43.6	
5	2	Spain		44.3	

=== Final ===
Rank	Lane	Nation	Athletes	Time	Notes
1st place, gold medalist(s)	3	France	Hubert Dufernez, Christian Larrieu, Habib Thiam, Joël Caprice	41.4	=GR
2nd place, silver medalist(s)	4	West Germany	Dieter Kröger, Klaus Förster, Karl-Heinz Naujoks, Manfred Germar	41.4	=GR
3rd place, bronze medalist(s)	6	Soviet Union	Vladilyen Marin, Albert Plaskeyev, Yuriy Petrov, Leonid Bartenyev	41.5	
4	1	Italy	Caezabre, Sergio D'Asnasch, Lucio Sangermano, Boroda	41.9	
5	2	Poland	Janusz Bielski, Zdzisław Szczepański, Mieczysław Borek, Wojciech Czajkowski	42.3	
6	5	Romania	Mircea Pop, Ilarie Măgdaş, Tiberiu Ardeleanu, Traian Sudrigean	42.7	
