= 1952 AAA Championships =

Outdoor track and field competition

- Dates: 21–22 June 1952
- Host city: London, England
- Venue: White City Stadium
- Level: Senior
- Type: Outdoor

The 1952 AAA Championships was the 1952 edition of the annual outdoor track and field competition organised by the Amateur Athletic Association (AAA). It was held from 21 to 22 June 1952 at White City Stadium in London, England.

== Summary ==
The Championships covered two days of competition. The marathon was held from Windsor to Chiswick and the decathlon event was held in Port Sunlight, Merseyside. The 220 yards hurdles was contested for the first time.

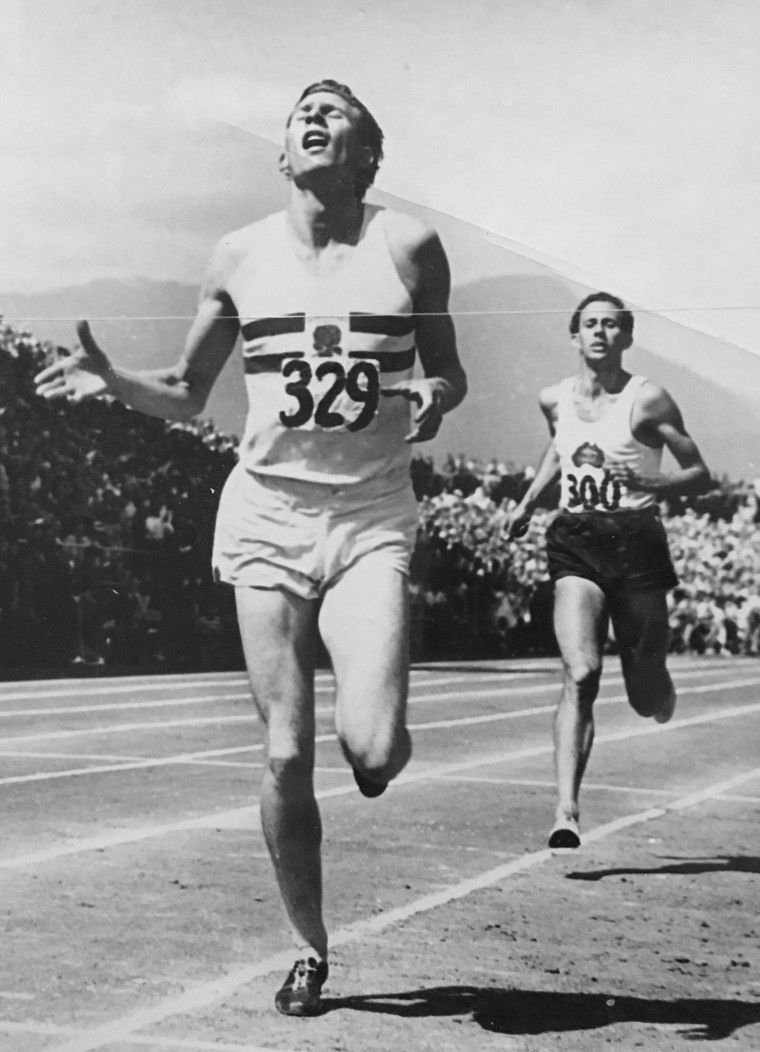
Roger Bannister

== Results ==
| Event | Gold | | Silver | | Bronze | |
|---|---|---|---|---|---|---|
| 100 yards | McDonald Bailey | 9.6 =NR | Alan Lillington | 9.9 | Brian Shenton | 10.0 |
| 220 yards | McDonald Bailey | 21.4 | Brian Shenton | 22.0 | (Scotland) William Jack | 22.2 |
| 440 yards | Arthur Wint | 48.1 | Leslie Lewis | 48.6 | Terry Higgins | 49.1 |
| 880 yards | Roger Bannister | 1:51.5 | Albert Webster | 1:52.7 | Frank Evans | 1:53.5 |
| 1 mile | Bill Nankeville | 4:09.8 | (Australia) John Landy | 4:11.0 | David Law | 4:12.6 |
| 3 miles | Chris Chataway | 13:59.6 | Alan Parker | 14:00.8 | Philip Morgan | 14:03.8 |
| 6 miles | Gordon Pirie | 28:55.6 NR | Frederick Norris | 29:00.6 | Frank Sando | 29:05.2 |
| marathon | Jim Peters | 2:20:42.2 WR | Stan Cox | 2:21:42 | Geoff Iden | 2:26:53.8 |
| steeplechase | (Wales) John Disley | 9:44.0 NR | Chris Brasher | 10:03.6 | (Socialist Federal Republic of Yugoslavia) Petar Šegedin | 10:06.4 |
| 120y hurdles | (Australia) Ray Weinberg | 14.4 | Peter Hildreth | 14.4 | (Australia) Ken Doubleday | 14.6 |
| 220y hurdles | Peter Hildreth | 24.6 | Jack Parker | 24.9 | Paul Vine | 25.6 |
| 440y hurdles | Harry Whittle | 53.3 NR | Angus Scott | 53.4 | (Scotland) David Gracie | 54.0 |
| 2 miles walk | Roland Hardy | 13:27.8 | Gerald Gregory | 14:26.0 | Terry Whitlock | 14:49.0 |
| 7 miles walk | Roland Hardy | 50:05.6 | Lol Allen | 51:29.2 | George Coleman | 52:24.6 |
| high jump | Ron Pavitt | 1.930 | Peter Wells | 1.880 | Nafiu Osagie | 1.880 |
| pole vault | Geoff Elliott | 3.96 | Tim Anderson (Scotland) Norman Gregor | 3.81 | n/a | |
| long jump | Sylvanus Williams | 7.32 | Roy Cruttenden | 7.10 | (Saar Protectorate) Toni Breder | 7.01 |
| triple jump | (Saar Protectorate) Willi Burgard | 14.60 | Neville Coleman | 14.15 | (Australia) Ian Polmear | 13.85 |
| shot put | John Savidge | 16.50 | John Giles | 14.83 | William Holland | 13.81 |
| discus throw | Mark Pharaoh | 44.70 | (Australia) Ian Reed | 43.14 | Andrew Jansons | 41.68 |
| hammer throw | (Scotland) Duncan Clark | 53.03 | (Scotland) Ewan Douglas | 52.03 | Peter Allday | 51.72 |
| javelin throw | Michael Denley | 65.86 NR | (Northern Ireland) Dick Miller | 62.82 | Dennis Tucker | 60.29 |
| decathlon | Les Pinder | 5502 | David Holmes | 5039 | Sidney Coleman | 4380 |

== See also ==
- 1952 WAAA Championships
