= Fouad Yazgi =

Egyptian sprinter

Personal information
- Nationality: Egyptian
- Born: 9 October 1932 Alexandria, Egypt
- Died: 25 October 1998 (aged 66) Montreal, Quebec, Canada

Sport
- Sport: Sprinting
- Event: 4 × 100 metres relay

Fouad Yazgi (9 October 1932 – 25 October 1998) was an Egyptian sprinter. He competed in the men's 4 × 100 metres relay at the 1952 Summer Olympics.
