= Alain Porthault =

French sportsman (1929–2019)

Personal information
- Born: 15 July 1929 Vervins, France
- Died: 25 November 2019 (aged 90)
- Height: 180 cm (5 ft 11 in)
- Weight: 65 kg (143 lb)

Sport
- Country: France
- Sport: Athletics
- Events: 100 meters 4 × 100 metres relay

Alain Porthault (15 July 1929 – 25 November 2019) was a French sprinter and rugby player. He competed in the men’s 4 x 100 meters relay in the 1948 Summer Olympics and in the Men’s 100 meters and the Men’s 4 x 100 meters relay at the 1952 Summer Olympics. In rugby, he played for Racing 92 from 1951 to 1953. He also earned seven caps with the France national rugby union team. He died on 25 November 2019 at the age of 90.

== Competition record ==
Year	Competition	Venue	Position	Event	Notes
Representing France
1952	Olympics	Helsinki, Finland	5th, SF 1	100 m	11.04/10.8
