= Philip Morgan (cricketer) =

English cricketer, athlete, clergyman, educator

Personal information
- Born: 11 March 1927; Derby, Derbyshire, England
- Died: 12 January 2017 (aged 89); Winslow, Buckinghamshire, England
- Batting: Right-handed
- Bowling: Leg break

Domestic team information
- Years: Team
- 1946: Oxford University

Career statistics
Competition	First-class
Matches	1
Runs scored	1
Batting average	1.00
100s/50s	0/0
Top score	1
Balls bowled	36
Wickets	0
Bowling average	–
5 wickets in innings	–
10 wickets in match	–
Best bowling	–
Catches/stumpings	0/–
- Source: Cricinfo, 31 March 2020
- Sports career
- Sport: Athletics
- Event: middle-distance
- Club: South London Harriers

Philip Richard Llewelyn Morgan (11 March 1927 – 12 January 2017) was an English sportsman, clergyman and educator.

== Life ==
He was born at Derby in March 1927, the eldest son of the Rev. Morgan Brinley Morgan, in a family of seven sons and one daughter. He was brought up for a time in Highams Park in east London; his father became vicar of Hockley from 1935. He was educated at St Edmund's School at Hindhead, and St John's School, Leatherhead.

In 1945 Morgan went to the University of Oxford, supported by the Royal Air Force, where he studied Greats - classical history, philosophy and languages - at Wadham College and theology at St Stephen's House. While studying at Oxford, he made a single appearance in first-class cricket against the touring Indians at Oxford in 1946. He then spent time in Southern Rhodesia as a trainee pilot, returning to Oxford in 1948.

Morgan at this period was known as a middle and long-distance runner. He beat the future Olympic champion Chris Brasher in the Varsity three-mile race in 1951, and three years later he ran in the race that proceeded Roger Bannister's record-breaking four-minute mile at Iffley Road. Morgan finished third behind Christopher Chataway in the 3 miles event at the 1952 AAA Championships.

Morgan took holy orders in the Church of England. Morgan's first ecclesiastical post was as curate of Warlingham, Surrey from 1955–58. He then became the chaplain of Haileybury and Imperial Service College, before becoming the headmaster of the college's Prep school. Following his retirement from Haileybury, he later became the rector of The Deverills in Wiltshire. Morgan died suddenly in January 2017 at Winslow, Buckinghamshire.
