= George Acquaah =

Ghanaian sprinter (1925–1963)

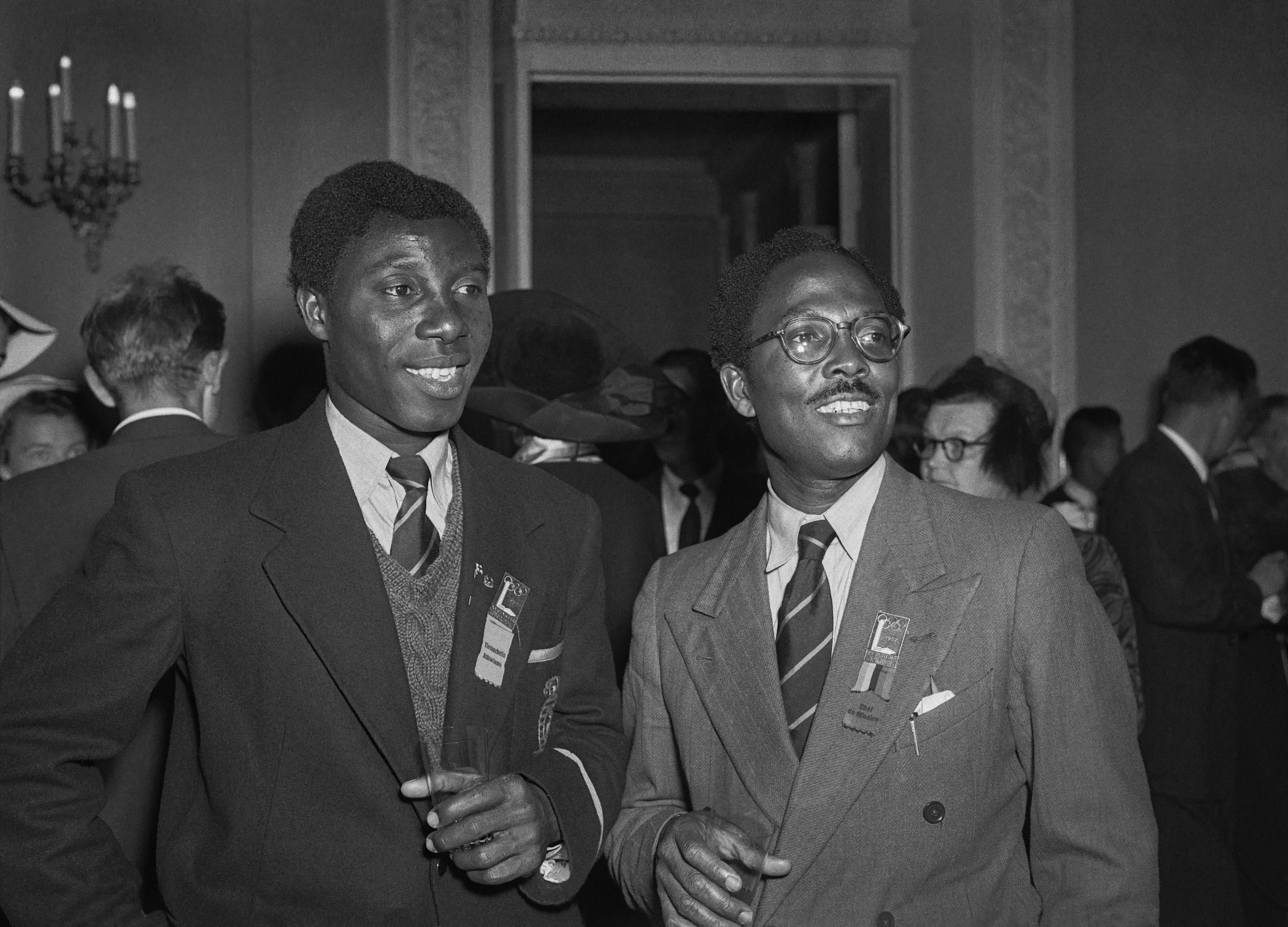
- George Acquaah with A. K. Konuah in 1952 Summer Olympics

Personal information
- Full name: George Wilson Acquaah
- Born: 3 October 1925
- Died: 18 December 1963 (aged 38)

Sport
- Country: Gold Coast
- Sport: Track and field
- Events: 100 metres, 4 × 100 metres relay

Achievements and titles
- Olympic finals: 1952 Summer Olympics

George Wilson Acquaah (3 October 1925 – 18 December 1963) Ghanaian track and field sprinter who competed at the 1952 Olympic Games.

In 1952, George Acquaah appeared as one of seven athletes for the Gold Coast at the Summer Olympics in the Finnish capital Helsinki. In the seventh heat for the 100 metres race the 26-year-old was eliminated with a time of 11.1 seconds in fifth place. In the second heat of the 4×100 metres relay the Gold Coast team, with Acquaah as the second runner and with Gabriel Laryea, John Owusu and Augustus Lawson, earned a time of 42.1 seconds putting them in fourth place, which again led to an elimination.
