= Dominik Sucheński =

Polish sprinter

Personal information
- Nationality: Polish
- Born: 8 September 1926 Brodnica, Poland
- Died: 20 May 2013 (aged 86) Brodnica, Poland
- Height: 1.81 m (5 ft 11 in)
- Weight: 75 kg (165 lb)

Sport
- Sport: Sprinting
- Event: 100 metres
- Club: AZS Wrocław (1945–1950); Gwardia Wrocław (1951–1954)

Dominik Sucheński (8 September 1926 – 20 May 2013) was a Polish sprinter. He competed in the men's 4 × 100 metres relay at the 1952 Summer Olympics.

Using the callsign "Sokół" (Falcon), he was a member of armed resistance during World War Two and took part in the Warsaw Uprising.

== International competitions ==
| Year | Competition | Venue | Position | Event | Notes |
Representing Poland
| 1952 | Olympic Games | Helsinki, Finland | 9th (sf) | 4 × 100 metres relay | 41.91 |

== Personal bests ==
- 100 metres – 10.6h (Kraków 1950)
- 200 metres – 22.6h (Kraków 1950)
- Long jump – 6.98 (Gdańsk 1949)
