= Franz Happernagel =

German sprinter

Personal information
- Nationality: German
- Born: 25 December 1929 (age 96)

Sport
- Sport: Sprinting
- Event: 4 × 100 metres relay

Franz Happernagel (born 25 December 1929) is a German sprinter. He competed in the men's 4 × 100 metres relay at the 1952 Summer Olympics.
