= José Julio Barillas =

Guatemalan sprinter

Personal information
- Nationality: Guatemalan
- Born: 7 January 1932 Obero, Escuintla, Guatemala
- Died: 2013 (age 80–81) New York City, New York, United States.

Sport
- Sport: Sprinting
- Event: 100 metres

José Julio Barillas (7 January 1932 – 2013) was a Guatemalan and American sprinter and community worker. As an athlete for Guatemala, he competed in professional football and represented Guatemala at the 1952 Summer Olympics in sprinting. He later immigrated to New York City and was active in the Guatemalan community living there, co-founding organizations such as the Guatemalan Chamber of Commerce.

== Biography ==
José Julio Barillas was born on 7 January 1932 in Obero, Escuintla, Guatemala. As an athlete, he was selected to be part of the Guatemalan team at the 1952 Summer Olympics in Helsinki, Finland. He competed in the men's 100 metres and men's 200 metres, recording times of 11.56 seconds and 22.88 seconds (a personal best), respectively. Though, he did not advance past the preliminary heats of either event and did not medal. He was also entered in the men's long jump but did not start in the event. While he lived in Guatemala, he worked as a physical education teacher and as a professional football player.

Barillas later immigrated to the United States and settled in New York City. There, he married and had two children named Julio and Ronald. Barillas was also active within the local Guatemalan community in New York City, co-founding organizations such as the La Casa Guatemalteca en Nueva York, Guatemalan Chamber of Commerce, and the Casa de la Cultura. He was also a member of the League of United Latin American Citizens and a director of a Spanish-language newspaper named Aqui Guatemala. Aside from his community work, he directed the funeral home Funeraria la Fe until he died in 2013.
