= USCGC Winslow Griesser =

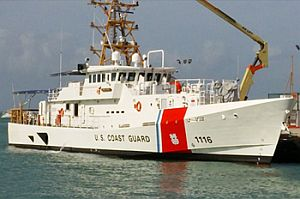
- Delivering Winslow Griesser

History

United States
- Name: USCGC Winslow Griesser
- Namesake: Winslow W. Griesser
- Operator: United States Coast Guard
- Builder: Bollinger Shipyards, Lockport, Louisiana
- Launched: December 23, 2015
- Acquired: December 23, 2015
- Commissioned: March 11, 2016
- Home port: San Juan, Puerto Rico
- Identification: MMSI number: 338926416; Callsign: NDOD; Hull number: WPC-1116
- Motto: Fortitudo illimitatae; (Strength without bounds)
- Status: in active service
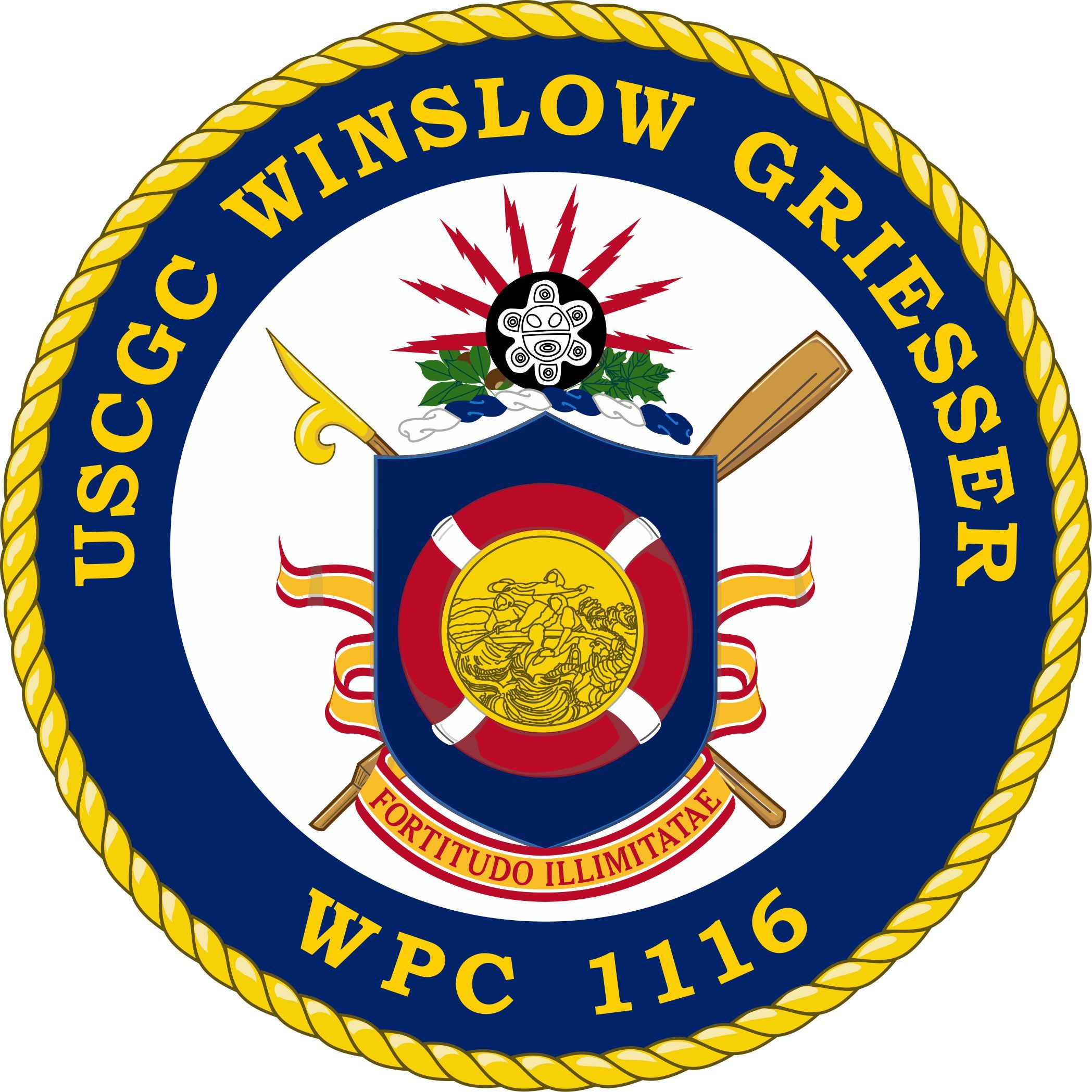
- Badge

General characteristics
- Class & type: Sentinel-class cutter
- Displacement: 353 long tons (359 t)
- Length: 46.8 m (154 ft)
- Beam: 8.11 m (26.6 ft)
- Depth: 2.9 m (9.5 ft)
- Propulsion: 2 × 4,300 kilowatts (5,800 shp); 1 × 75 kilowatts (101 shp) bow thruster
- Speed: 28 knots (52 km/h; 32 mph)
- Range: 2,500 nautical miles (4,600 km; 2,900 mi)
- Endurance: 5 days
- Boats & landing craft carried: 1 × Short Range Prosecutor RHIB
- Complement: 2 officers, 20 crew
- Sensors & processing systems: L-3 C4ISR suite
- Armament: 1 × Mk 38 Mod 2 25 mm automatic gun; 4 × crew-served Browning M2 machine guns

USCGC Winslow Griesser (WPC-1116) was the sixteenth Sentinel-class cutter to be delivered. She is the fourth of six Sentinel-class vessels to be stationed in San Juan, Puerto Rico. Bollinger shipyards delivered her to the United States Coast Guard, in Key West, Florida, on December 23, 2015. After she completed her acceptance trials, she was commissioned on March 11, 2016.

== Operational history ==
The Winslow Griesser participated in the multi-nation training exercise known as Tradewinds 2017 in June 2017.

On August 8, 2022, the Winslow Griesser collided with the center console boat Desakata off of Dorado, Puerto Rico, causing the death of a fisherman in the smaller boat. The National Transportation Safety Board attributed the crash to neither vessel's crew seeing the other, and found that neither crew was "maintaining a proper lookout." A separate Coast Guard investigation found that the Desakata should have yielded the right of way to the Winslow Griesser, but that the cutter's crew could have prevented the incident if they had maintained a better lookout. As a result of the incident, the Winslow Griesser's commanding officer was relieved of his command.

== Namesake ==
Like all the vessels in her class, Winslow Griesser is named after an individual from the Coast Guard's past who has been recognized as a hero. Winslow W. Griesser was the keeper of the United States Lifesaving Service's Buffalo Station in 1900. When he and his crew ventured out in stormy weather to rescue the crew of two scows they saw had overturned, their own surfboat overturned. Nevertheless, Griesser and a companion tried to swim out, with a tow rope, to rescue survivors who were clinging tenuously to a pile. Griesser's companion was injured, and Griesser continued, alone. He reached the pile, and with great difficulty did rescue the sole remaining survivor. Griesser received the Gold Lifesaving Medal to recognize his exceptional bravery in this rescue.
