= Lindy Remigino =

American sprinter (1931–2018)

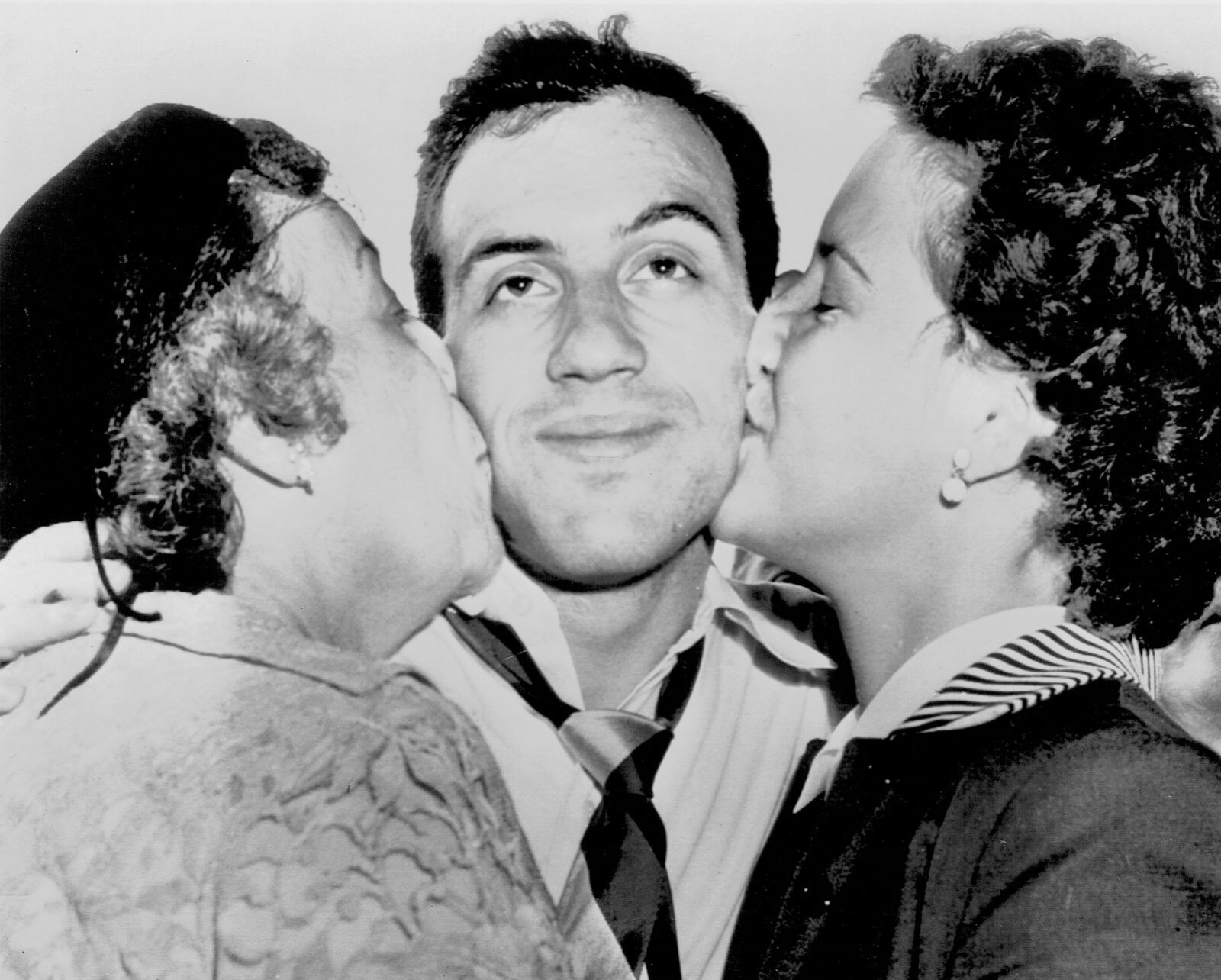
- Remigino with mother Rose (left) and fiancée June Haverty in 1952

Personal information
- Born: June 3, 1931 Elmhurst, Queens, New York, U.S.
- Died: July 11, 2018 (aged 87)
- Education: Manhattan College
- Height: 173 cm (5 ft 8 in)
- Weight: 67 kg (148 lb)

Sport
- Sport: Athletics
- Events: 100 m, 200 m
- Club: NYAC, New York

Achievements and titles
- Personal bests: 100 m – 10.4 (1952); 200 m – 21.1 (1951)
Medal record
Representing the United States
Olympic Games
Gold medal – first place	1952 Helsinki	100 meters
Gold medal – first place	1952 Helsinki	4 × 100 m relay

Lindy John Remigino (June 3, 1931 – July 11, 2018) was an American track and field athlete, the 1952 Olympic 100 m champion.

== Life and career ==
Remigino was born in Elmhurst, Queens, New York. He was named after aviator Charles Lindbergh. In 1952, while at Manhattan College he won the ICAAAA 220 championship, then placed close second to Morgan State's sprinter, Art Bragg, at the United States Olympic Trials. The expected main American contender for the Olympic title, Jim Golliday, was injured and did not qualify. In Helsinki, one of the leading American sprinters, Art Bragg, was injured prior to the Games, leaving two Americans, Dean Smith and Remigino to qualify for the final.

Out of the blocks, John Treloar took a step ahead, but Remigino the eventual Olympic champion and several more quickly picked up his pace, with Jamaica's Herb McKenley lagging well behind. By the 80 m mark, Remigino held a big lead: however, in his excitement at sight of the advancing tape, he pitched forward in a virtual lean. He therefore decelerated in the lean, and, as McKenley came quickly, at the tape no one was certain who won. The final was "probably the closest mass finish in Olympic 100 metre history" with the first four runners all clocking in at 10.4 seconds hand-timed (with the fifth and sixth runners only 0.1 behind in 10.5), all six finalists within 0.12 seconds electric-timed (10.79 for first, 10.91 for sixth), and a photo finish necessary to separate the winners. Across Europe that Summer, Remigino defeated McKenley several times more in the 100, while McKenley defeated the new "World's Fastest Human" one time in the 200 m race. In Oslo, Norway, Remigino won in 10.2 s which would have equaled the 100-meters world-record, but an out of place wind-o-meter meant the time could not be ratified. His official best time was 10.4 s.

In 1953, Remigino won both ICAAAA sprint championships. In 1955 he placed second to Bobby Morrow in the 100 US Nationals.

Following his running career, Remigino became a coach at the Hartford High School in Connecticut.

Remingino died on July 11, 2018, at the age of 87.
