= Polina Lazareva =

Soviet Union sprinter

Personal information
- Born: 5 May 1930 Odesa, Ukrainian SSR, Soviet Union

Sport
- Sport: Running
- Event: 400 meters

Polina Lazareva (née Solopova, born 5 May 1930) was a Ukrainian sprinter who represented the Soviet Union. She was the holder of the women's 400m world record.

== Career ==
Lazareva achieved the women's world record for 400m on 10 May 1957 of 55.2s in Moscow.

Track and Field News ranked Lazareva, listed under her maiden name Solopova, as 7th in the world at 400m in 1957.

Lazareva won four medals at the Uniion Internationale des Etudiantes (UIE) organised sporting events at the World Festival of Youth and Students:

- Gold in the 800 m in 1951
- Bronze in the 4x200m relay in 1953
- Gold in the 400m in 1953
- Silver in the 400m in 1954

Lazarva individually or as a member of a team set 6 world record/best times:

- 55.7 s for 400m in Leipzig on 12 June 1954
- 55.2 s for 400m in Moscow on 10 May 1957
- 2:11.7 for 800m in Kyiv on 27 May 1952
- 6:49.6 for 3x800m in Moscow on 24 July 1950
- 6:44.8 for 3x800m in Moscow on 10 July 1951
- 1:12.9 for 500m in Moscow on 5 June 1953

Note:only the first two times are officially ratified world records; the first in the era of the Federation Sportive Feminine Internationale (FISU); the second in the era of the IAAF.

Lazareva also won medals in the 400m and 800m events at the Soviet championships:

- silver at 400m and 800m in 1952
- silver at 400m in 1953
- gold at 400m in 1954
- silver at 400m in 1957

Note: the titles in 1952-54 are under the surname Solopova; that in 1957 under the surname Lazareva.
