= Sven-Olof Westlund =

Swedish sprinter

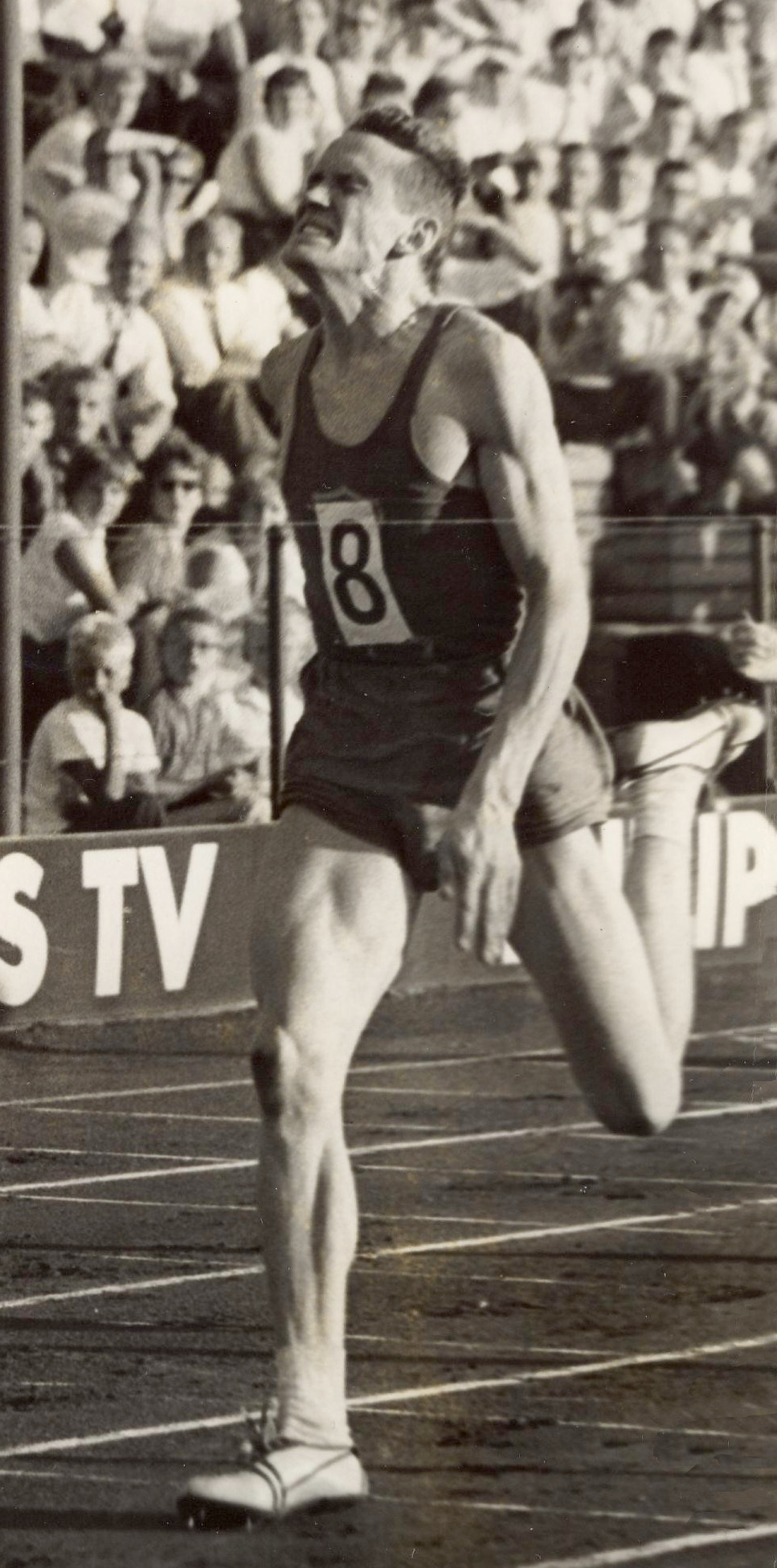

Personal information
- Born: 12 February 1932
- Died: 4 August 2015 (aged 83)

Sport
- Sport: Athletics
- Events: 100 m, 200 m
- Club: Ludvika FFI; UoIF Matteuspojkarna

Achievements and titles
- Personal bests: 100 m – 10.4; 200 m – 21.5

Sven-Olof Westlund (12 February 1932 – 4 August 2015) was a Swedish sprinter.

Westlund won the national 200 m title in 1959 and was part of the Swedish 4 × 100 m team that finished sixth at the 1954 European Championships. Westlund represented Ludvika FFI and UoIF Matteuspojkarna.

Westlund died on 4 August 2015, at the age of 83.
