= Étienne Bally =

French sprinter (1923–2018)

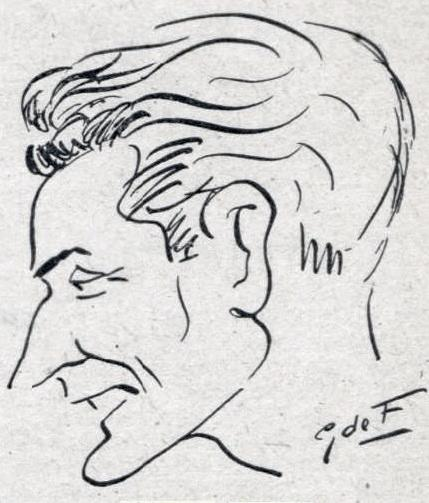
- Étienne Bally, par G. de F. en juillet 1947

Medal record

Men's athletics

Representing France

European Championships
| Gold medal – first place | 1950 Brussels | 100 m |
| Silver medal – second place | 1950 Brussels | 200 m |
| Silver medal – second place | 1950 Brussels | 4×100 m |

Étienne Marcel Bally (17 April 1923 – 10 January 2018) was a French sprinter and a European champion over 100 metres. He was born in Vénissieux.

Bally's first major competition was the 1946 European Championships held in Oslo, where he finished fourth in the final of the 100 metres—his time was equal to that of the bronze medalist, Carlo Monti. He also competed at the 1948 Olympics in London, where he reached the quarter-final of the 200 metres, but he failed to finish his heat of the 100 metres.

Bally's achieved his greatest success at the 1950 European Championships in Brussels, where he won gold in the 100 metres and silver in both the 200 metres and the 4 × 100 metres—he ran the first leg of the final and was followed by Jacques Perlot, Yves Camus and Jean-Pierre Guillon. His final major championships were the 1952 Olympics in Helsinki, where he reached the quarter-finals of both the 100 metres and the 200 metres and finished fifth in the final of the 4 × 100 metres.

== Competition record ==
| Year | Competition | Venue | Position | Event | Notes |
Representing France
| 1952 | Olympics | Helsinki, Finland | 4th, Qtr 2 | 100 m | 10.98/10.8 |
