= Josef Heinen =

German sprinter

Personal information
- Nationality: German
- Born: 11 April 1929
- Died: 20 December 1988 (aged 59)

Sport
- Sport: Sprinting
- Event: 4 × 100 metres relay

Josef Heinen (11 April 1929 – 20 December 1988) was a German sprinter. He competed in the men's 4 × 100 metres relay at the 1952 Summer Olympics.
