= William Jack (athlete) =

British sprinter

Personal information
- Nationality: British (Scottish)
- Born: 20 December 1930 Glasgow, Scotland
- Died: 9 December 2008 (aged 77) West Kilbride, Scotland
- Height: 172 cm (5 ft 8 in)
- Weight: 62 kg (137 lb)

Sport
- Sport: Athletics
- Event: Sprinting
- Club: Victoria Park AAC, Glasgow

William Jack (20 December 1930 – 9 December 2008) also known as Willie Jack was a British sprinter who competed at the 1952 Summer Olympics.

== Biography ==
Jack was born in Glasgow, Scotland and held Scottish national records in both the 100 and 220 yards.

From 1951 to 1953 he was the Scottish champion over both sprint distances. Jack finished third behind McDonald Bailey in the 220 yards event at the 1952 AAA Championships. Shortly afterwards he represented the Great Britain team at the 1952 Olympic Games in Helsinki, where he competed in the men's 100 metres.

== Competition record ==
Year	Competition	Venue	Position	Event	Notes
Representing Great Britain
1952	Olympics	Helsinki, Finland	5th, SF 2	100 m	11.01/10.7
