= Erich Fuchs (athlete) =

German sprinter

Personal information
- Nationality: German
- Born: 27 June 1925 Rheinland-Pfalz, Germany
- Died: 26 July 2014 (aged 89) Kaiserslautern, Germany

Sport
- Sport: Sprinting
- Event: 100 metres

Erich Fuchs (27 June 1925 – 26 July 2014) was a German sprinter. He competed in the men's 100 metres at the 1952 Summer Olympics.

== Competition record ==
Year	Competition	Venue	Position	Event	Notes
Representing Germany
1952	Olympics	Helsinki, Finland	3rd, Heat 12	100 m	11.19/10.8
