= Mikhail Kazantsev =

Soviet sprinter

Personal information
- Nationality: Soviet
- Born: 30 July 1927 Grozny, Russian SFSR

Sport
- Sport: Sprinting
- Event: 100 metres

Mikhail Kazantsev (born 30 July 1927) is a Soviet former sprinter. He competed in the men's 100 metres at the 1952 Summer Olympics.

== Competition record ==
Year	Competition	Venue	Position	Event	Notes
Representing Soviet Union
1952	Olympics	Helsinki, Finland	3rd, Heat 3	100 m	11.16/11.0
