= Olga Kosheleva =

Soviet sprinter (born 1932)

Personal information
- Nationality: Soviet
- Born: 8 October 1932 (age 93)

Sport
- Sport: Sprinting
- Event: 200 metres

Olga Kosheleva (born 8 October 1932) is a Soviet sprinter. She competed in the women's 200 metres at the 1956 Summer Olympics.
