= Muhammad Fazil =

Pakistani sprinter (1926–2018)

Personal information
- Nationality: Pakistani
- Born: 15 November 1926
- Died: 21 May 2018 (aged 91) Rawalpindi, Pakistan

Sport
- Sport: Sprinting
- Event: 4 × 100 metres relay

Muhammad Fazil (15 November 1926 – 21 May 2018) was a Pakistani sprinter. He competed in the men's 4 × 100 metres relay at the 1952 Summer Olympics, where he, together with the Pakistan national team, qualified for the semifinals but was eliminated before the final.
