= Guivi Sanadze =

Georgian professor, plant physiologist and biochemist (1929–2021)

Guivi A. Sanadze (Georgian: გივი სანაძე, 30 July 1929 – 11 January 2021) was a Georgian professor, plant physiologist and biochemist. He was a member of Georgian National Academy of Sciences, holder of the Order of Friendship of Peoples and the Order of Honor of Georgia.

== Biography ==
Sanadze was born in Tbilisi on 30 July 1929. In 1957, Sanadze discovered light-dependent isoprene emission from plant leaves and researches biological role for synthesis and release of isoprene in view of the entropy phenomenon.

Sanadze earned a Bachelor of Science degree in 1952 from Tbilisi State University. In 1968 he obtained Doctor of Science Degree from K. A. Timiryazev Institute of Plant Physiology of the Russian Academy of Sciences. He was a professor of Tbilisi State University, where in 1968 he founded the Laboratory of Photosynthesis. From 1983 up to 2000 he was a head of the Department of Plant Physiology and Anatomy of Tbilisi State University. In 1983 Guivi A. Sanadze was elected as an academician of the Georgian National Academy of Sciences, where from 1989 up to 2003 he served as a Vice-President.

Sanadze died on 11 January 2021, at the age of 91.
