= Flora Kazantseva =

Soviet sprinter (born 1929)

Personal information
- Nationality: Soviet
- Born: 1929

Sport
- Sport: Sprinting
- Event: 200 metres

Flora Kazantseva (born 1929) is a Soviet sprinter. She competed in the women's 200 metres at the 1952 Summer Olympics.
