= Issi Baran =

Finnish sprinter

Personal information
- Nationality: Finnish
- Born: 4 November 1927 Helsinki, Finland
- Died: 25 April 2018 (aged 90)

Sport
- Sport: Sprinting
- Event: 100 metres

Issi Baran (4 November 1927 – 25 April 2018) was a Finnish sprinter. He competed in the men's 100 metres at the 1952 Summer Olympics. As a Finnish Jew, Baran represented the Finnish Jewish sports club Makkabi Helsinki.
