= Willy Schneider (athlete) =

Swiss sprinter (1929–2022)

Personal information
- Nationality: Swiss
- Born: 20 October 1929
- Died: 31 January 2022 (aged 92)

Sport
- Sport: Sprinting
- Event: 100 metres

Willy Schneider (20 October 1929 – 31 January 2022) was a Swiss sprinter. He competed in the men's 100 metres at the 1952 Summer Olympics.
