= Jan Lammers (athlete) =

Dutch sprinter

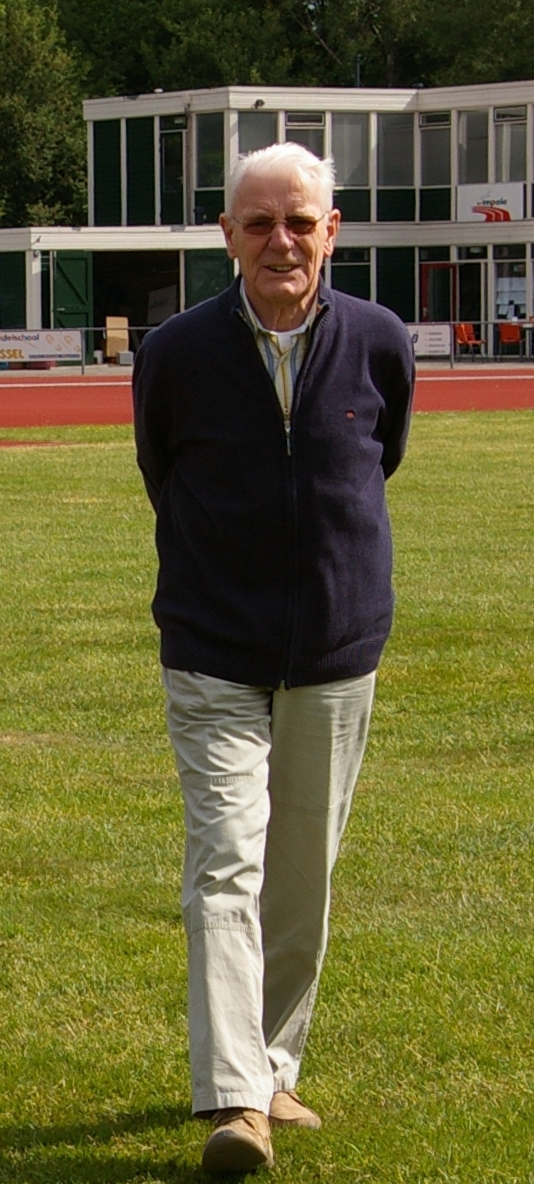
- Jan Lammers in 2008

Personal information
- Nationality: Dutch
- Born: 30 September 1926 Drachten, Friesland, Netherlands
- Died: 1 September 2011 (aged 84)

Sport
- Sport: Track and field
- Events: 100m, 200m, 4×100m
Medal record
Men's athletics
Representing the Netherlands
European Championships
Bronze medal – third place	1950 Brussels	200 m

Jan Lammers (30 September 1926 – 1 September 2011) was a Dutch sprinter. He competed in the 200 m and 4 × 100 m relay events at the 1948 Summer Olympics and finished in sixth place in the relay.

As a teenager Lammers trained in gymnastics and changed to athletics only after World War II. At the 1946 European Athletics Championships he was part of the Dutch 4 × 100 m team (with Jo Zwaan, Gabe Scholten and Chris van Osta) that finished in fourth place. In 1948 he won his first Dutch title, in the 200 m. Two years later, he won two national sprint titles and a bronze medal in the 200 m event at the 1950 European Athletics Championships. He was preparing for the 1952 Summer Olympics, but tore a muscle. The same year he got married, retired from competitions and later worked as a garage keeper.

== Competition record ==
Year	Competition	Venue	Position	Event	Notes
Representing Netherlands
1948	Olympics	London, England	4th, Qtr 1	200 m	
