= Carlo Vittori =

Italian sprinter

Personal information
- Nationality: Italian
- Born: 10 March 1931
- Died: 24 December 2015 (aged 84) Ascoli Piceno, Italy

Sport
- Sport: Sprinting
- Event: 100 metres

Carlo Vittori (10 March 1931 – 24 December 2015) was an Italian sprinter and athletics coach. He competed in the men's 100 metres at the 1952 Summer Olympics. He was portrayed by Luca Barbareschi in the Italian RAI TV film Pietro Mennea - La freccia del Sud (2015).

== Competition record ==
Year	Competition	Venue	Position	Event	Notes
Representing Italy
1952	Olympics	Helsinki, Finland	6th, Qtr 4	100 m	11.19/10.9
