= Fritz Griesser =

Swiss sprinter

Personal information
- Nationality: Swiss
- Born: 17 January 1929
- Died: 19 July 2013 (aged 84)

Sport
- Sport: Sprinting
- Event: 100 metres

Fritz Griesser (17 January 1929 – 19 July 2013) was a Swiss sprinter. He competed in the men's 100 metres at the 1952 Summer Olympics.
