= Milan Fillo =

Czechoslovak sprinter

Personal information
- Nationality: Czech
- Born: 23 April 1929 Žilina, Czechoslovakia
- Died: 2 November 2004 (aged 75)

Sport
- Sport: Sprinting
- Event: 400 metres

Milan Fillo (23 April 1929 Žilina – 2 November 2004 Karlovy Vary) was a Czechoslovak sprinter. He competed in the men's 400 metres at the 1952 Summer Olympics.
