= György Csányi (athlete) =

Hungarian sprinter

Medal record

Men's athletics

Representing Hungary

Olympic Games
Bronze medal – third place	1952 Helsinki	4×100 m

European Championships
Gold medal – first place	1954 Bern	4×100 m

György Csányi (7 March 1922 – 13 December 1978) was a Hungarian athlete who mainly competed in the 100 metres.

He competed for Hungary at the 1952 Summer Olympics held in Helsinki, Finland where he won the bronze medal in the men's 4 × 100 metres relay with his teammates László Zarándi, Géza Varasdi and Béla Goldoványi.

== Competition record ==
Year	Competition	Venue	Position	Event	Notes
Representing Hungary
1948	Olympics	London, England	3rd, Heat 7	100 m	11.1
1952	Olympics	Helsinki, Finland	5th, Qtr 4	100 m	11.07/10.9
