= Pauli Tavisalo =

Finnish sprinter

Personal information
- Nationality: Finnish
- Born: 29 January 1928 Lumivaara, Finland (now part of Russia)
- Died: 30 March 2006 (aged 78) Jämsä, Finland

Sport
- Sport: Sprinting
- Event: 100 metres

Pauli Tavisalo (29 January 1928 – 30 March 2006) was a Finnish sprinter. He competed in the men's 100 metres at the 1952 Summer Olympics.
