= Vladimir Sukharev =

Soviet athlete

Medal record

Men's athletics

Representing the Soviet Union

Olympic Games
Silver medal – second place	1952 Helsinki	4×100 m
Silver medal – second place	1956 Melbourne	4×100 m

European Championships
Gold medal – first place	1950 Brussels	4×100 m
Bronze medal – third place	1950 Brussels	100 m

Vladimir Sukharev (Russian: Владимир Сухарев) (July 10, 1924 – April 30, 1997) was a Soviet athlete, born in Georgievka, who competed mainly in the 100 metres. He trained at Dynamo in Moscow.

He competed for the USSR in the 1952 Summer Olympics held in Helsinki in the 4 × 100 metre relay where he won the silver medal with his teammates Boris Tokarev, Levan Kalyayev and Levan Sanadze.

Four years later at the 1956 Summer Olympics held in Melbourne he again teamed up with Boris Tokarev and new members Leonid Bartenev and Yuriy Konovalov in the 4 × 100 metre relay where the team won the silver medal.

== Competition record ==
Year	Competition	Venue	Position	Event	Notes
Representing Soviet Union
1952	Olympics	Helsinki, Finland	5th	100 m	10.88/10.5
