= Mario Colarossi =

Italian sprinter (1929–2010)

Personal information
- Nationality: Italian
- Born: 15 November 1929
- Died: 16 September 2010 (aged 80)

Sport
- Sport: Sprinting
- Event: 100 metres

Mario Colarossi (15 November 1929 – 16 September 2010) was an Italian sprinter. He competed in the men's 100 metres at the 1956 Summer Olympics.
