= Winslow W. Griesser =

US life-saving station keeper (1856–1931)

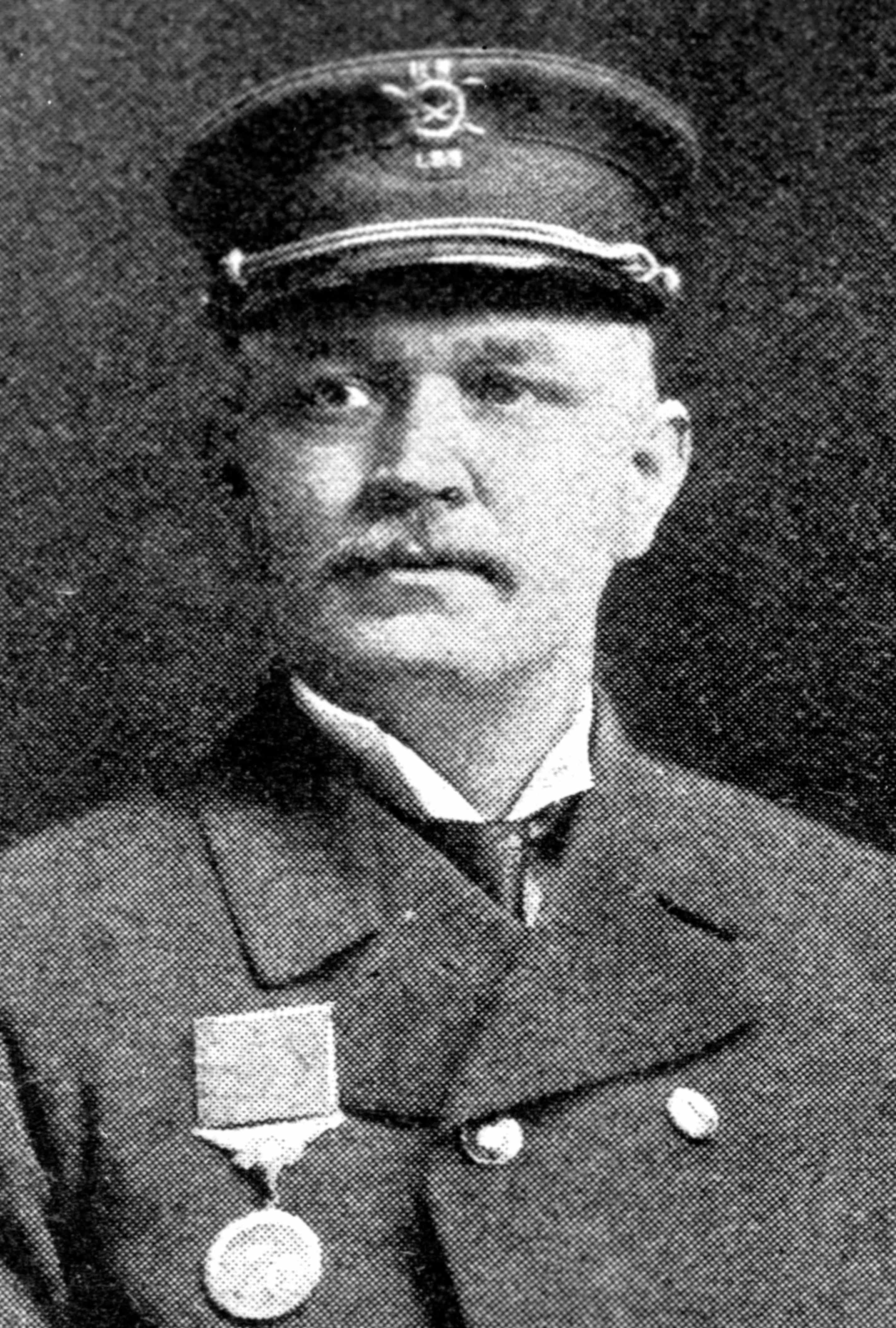

Winslow W. Griesser (1856–1931) was a station keeper in the United States Life-Saving Service, one of the agencies that were merged to form the United States Coast Guard. In 2016 the Coast Guard honored him by naming one of its new Sentinel-class cutters, USCGC Winslow W. Griesser, after him.

== Early life ==
Winslow W. Griesser was born in Marblehead, Ohio on September 1, 1856. He entered the United States Life-Saving Service as a surfman.

== Keeper ==
Keepers were full-time employees, who slept in quarters above the boathouse that formed the core of their stations. Their boat crews were not full-time employees. The station keepers job included recruiting and training local men capable of manning their boats, when needed. The boats were light, and were mounted on light wagons. A boat's crew would manually tow the wagon to a good launching site, near a distressed vessel. The boat was launched by towing the wagon into the water until the boat's buoyancy floated it clear of the wagon.

Griesser served at life–saving stations at Fort Niagara, New York, Lorain, Ohio, Marblehead, Ohio and Buffalo, New York.

On November 21, 1900, when commanding the Buffalo life–saving station, Griesser distinguished himself by heroically swimming out to rescue a stranded mariner, in the teeth of a gale. Griesser and his crew tried to launch their boat when a scow came loose in the gale-force winds. When his boat was damaged, when being launched, Griesser decided to swim out to the sole remaining survivor of the scow, who was clinging to an offshore pylon. The first attempt by Griesser and one of his crewmen, to swim out to the stranded man, towing a rescue line failed, when the large waves tossed them back on shore, injuring his companion. Griesser then attempted to rescue the man without assistance.

When he got close enough to throw the rescue line to the stranded man, he was too weak to secure himself, and the line fouled the pylon. Greisser was able to get close enough to free the stranded man, and secure the rescue rope to him, allowing him to be successfully hauled to safety. Griesser was so exhausted that he collapsed once he got to shore.

Griesser was award a Gold Lifesaving Medal.

== Legacy ==
Griesser died in Marblehead, Ohio on August 26, 1931.

The USCGC Winslow W. Griesser, commissioned on March 11, 2016, is the sixteenth cutter in the Sentinel class. She is homeported in San Juan, Puerto Rico. Sentinel-class cutters are named after enlisted rank individuals who served heroically in the Coast Guard, or one of its precursor services.

Several of Griesser's sons and grandsons enlisted in the Coast Guard.
