= Ion Baboie =

Romanian racewalker

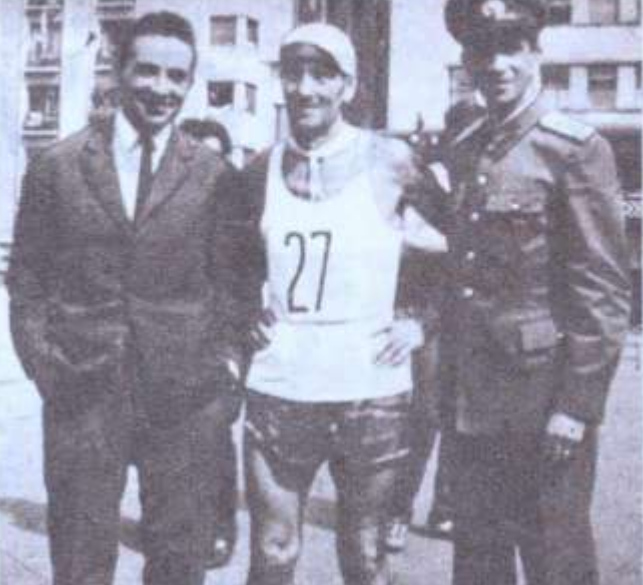
- Ion Baboie (in the middle) in 1970

Personal information
- Nationality: Romanian
- Born: 12 April 1914 Brașov, Romania

Sport
- Sport: Athletics
- Event: Racewalking

Ion Baboie (born 12 April 1914, date of death unknown) was a Romanian racewalker. He competed in the men's 50 kilometres walk at the 1952 Summer Olympics.
