= Géza Varasdi =

Hungarian sprinter (1928–2022)

Medal record

Men's athletics

Representing Hungary

Olympic Games
Bronze medal – third place	1952 Helsinki	4×100 m

European Championships
Gold medal – first place	1954 Bern	4×100 m

Géza Varasdi OAM (6 February 1928 – 4 May 2022) was a Hungarian athlete who mainly competed in the 100 metres. He was a member of the national team of Hungary between 1948 and 1956.

== Biography ==
Born in Budapest, Hungary, Varasdi competed for Hungary at the 1952 Summer Olympics held in Helsinki, Finland, where he won the bronze medal in the men's 4 × 100 meters relay with his teammates László Zarándi, György Csányi and Béla Goldoványi. Together with the same team, he won the gold medal on 29 August 1954 in Bern, at the European Championship of Athletics in the men's 4 × 100 meters relay. When participating at the Olympic Games in Melbourne, 1956, he suffered a crick in his semifinal. From 1956 he lived in Melbourne, working as a doctor. On Australia Day January 26, 2013 Dr Gez Varasdi was awarded the Medal of the Order for Australia for his valuable work and service to medicine as a general practitioner. Dr Varasdi's commendation in his Honours of Australia nomination, submitted by Domenica (Mimi) Tamburrino, JP OAM, contained numerous letters of support from his patients who testified that he always work beyond the limits of just being 'a doctor of medicine' but always provided wise counsel, encouragement and generous words of kindness. He treated his patients in the 'old world' tradition of the 'house call' doctor who would reach out without hesitation to visit the sick and the lonely in his area. A true medical doctor whose kind and generous character gave more that the "medicine" he would prescribe. He was highly regarded, respected and sought out by local schools and community groups to 'speak' to students and encourage them to actively participate in sports and have a healthy view of exercising and be active in achieving good health through sports.

The OAM was awarded to Dr Geza Varasdi for his community work as a general medical practitioner. He received this Award on Australia Day. He is survived by his wife Gianna and three sons.
