= Lev Kalyayev =

Soviet sprinter

Medal record

Men's athletics

Representing the Soviet Union

Olympic Games
Silver medal – second place	1952 Helsinki	4×100 m

European Championships
Gold medal – first place	1950 Brussels	4×100 m

Lev Alekseyevich Kalyayev (Russian: Лев Алексеевич Каляев; May 16, 1929 – August 19, 1983) was a Soviet athlete who competed mainly in the 100 metres.

Kalyayev competed for the USSR in the 1952 Summer Olympics held in Helsinki, Finland in the 4 × 100 metre relay where he won the silver medal with his teammates Boris Tokarev, Levan Sanadze and Vladimir Sukharev.

Kalyayev was born in Saint Petersburg on May 16, 1929. He died there on August 19, 1983, at the age of 54.
