= Youssef Ali Omar =

Egyptian sprinter (born 1928)

Personal information
- Nationality: Egyptian
- Born: 3 March 1928 Alexandria, Egypt

Sport
- Sport: Sprinting
- Event: 100 metres

Youssef Ali Omar (born 3 March 1928) is an Egyptian sprinter. He competed in the men's 100 metres at the 1952 Summer Olympics.
