= Friðrik Guðmundsson (athlete) =

Icelandic discus thrower (1925–2002)

Personal information
- Full name: Friðrik Jens Guðmundsson
- Nationality: Icelandic
- Born: 9 November 1925 Reykjavík, Iceland
- Died: 16 April 2002 (aged 76) Reykjavík, Iceland

Sport
- Sport: Athletics
- Event: Discus throw

Friðrik Guðmundsson (9 November 1925 – 16 April 2002) was an Icelandic athlete. He competed in the men's discus throw at the 1952 Summer Olympics.
