= Angel Kolev (athlete) =

Bulgarian sprinter

Personal information
- Nationality: Bulgarian
- Born: 15 April 1926 Dobrich, Bulgaria
- Died: 1998 (aged 71–72)

Sport
- Sport: Sprinting
- Event: 100 metres

Angel Kolev (15 April 1926 – 1998) was a Bulgarian sprinter. He competed in the men's 100 metres at the 1952 Summer Olympics.

== Competition record ==
| Year | Competition | Venue | Position | Event | Notes |
Representing Bulgaria
| 1952 | Olympics | Helsinki, Finland | 6th, Qtr 1 | 100 m | DQ |
