= John Owusu =

Ghanaian sprinter

Personal information
- Nationality: Ghanaian
- Born: 25 December 1925
- Died: Prior to 2009

Sport
- Sport: Sprinting
- Event: 4 × 100 metres relay

John Owusu (born 25 December 1925, died prior to 2009) was a Ghanaian sprinter. He competed in the men's 4 × 100 metres relay at the 1952 Summer Olympics.
