= Lucio Sangermano =

Italian sprinter

Personal information
- Nationality: Italian
- Born: 11 August 1932
- Died: 26 October 2014 (aged 82)

Sport
- Sport: Sprinting
- Event: 200 metres

Lucio Sangermano (11 August 1932 – 26 October 2014) was an Italian sprinter. He competed in the men's 200 metres at the 1952 Summer Olympics.
