= Angelo Moretti =

Italian sprinter

Personal information
- National team: Italy: 4 caps (1949-1950)
- Born: 16 August 1925 Venegono Inferiore, Italy
- Died: 2004 (aged 78–79)

Sport
- Sport: Athletics
- Event: Sprinting

Achievements and titles
- Personal best: 200 m: 21.6 (1950)

Angelo Moretti (16 August 1925 – 2004) was an Italian sprinter, who was 4th in the 200 m at the 1950 European Athletics Championships.

== Achievements ==
Year	Competition	Venue	Rank	Event	Time	Notes
1950	European Championships	(Belgium) Brussels	4th	200 m	22.1	

== See also ==
- Italy at the 1950 European Athletics Championships
