= Zdeněk Pospíšil =

Czechoslovak sprinter

Personal information
- Nationality: Czechoslovak
- Born: 20 August 1924
- Died: 17 May 2009 (aged 84)

Sport
- Sport: Sprinting
- Event: 100 metres

Zdeněk Pospíšil (20 August 1924 – 17 May 2009) was a Czechoslovak sprinter. He competed in the men's 100 metres at the 1952 Summer Olympics.
