= Hörður Haraldsson =

Icelandic sprinter (1929–2010)

Personal information
- Nationality: Icelandic
- Born: 11 September 1929 Vestmannaeyjar, Iceland
- Died: 5 October 2010 (aged 81) Vestmannaeyjar, Iceland

Sport
- Sport: Sprinting
- Event: 100 metres

Hörður Haraldsson (11 September 1929 – 5 October 2010) was an Icelandic sprinter. He competed in the men's 100 metres at the 1952 Summer Olympics.
