= Augustus Lawson =

Ghanaian sprinter

Personal information
- Nationality: Ghanaian
- Born: 24 May 1930

Sport
- Sport: Sprinting
- Event: 4 × 100 metres relay

Augustus Lawson (born 24 May 1930, date of death unknown) was a Ghanaian sprinter. He competed in the men's 4 × 100 metres relay at the 1952 Summer Olympics.
