= Franco Leccese =

Italian sprinter

Personal information
- Nationality: Italian
- Born: 24 April 1925 Condove, Italy
- Died: 22 June 1992 (aged 67)

Sport
- Country: Italy
- Sport: Athletics
- Event: Sprint
- Club: Gancia Torino

Achievements and titles
- Personal best: 100 m: 10.6 (1950)
Medal record
Men's athletics
Representing Italy
European Championships
Silver medal – second place	1950 Brussels	100 m
Mediterranean Games
Gold medal – first place	1951 Alexandria	4x100 m

Franco Leccese (24 April 1925 – 22 June 1992) was an Italian sprinter.

== Biography ==
Leccese won two medals at the International athletics competitions, and had 13 caps with the national team from 1949 to 1954.

== Achievements ==
Year	Competition	Venue	Position	Event	Performance	Note
1950	European Championships	(Belgium) Brussels	2nd	100 metres	10.7	
1951	Mediterranean Games	(Egypt) Alexandria	1st	4×100 metres relay	42.4	
1952	Olympic Games	(Finland) Helsinki	Heat	100 metres	10.9/11.18	

== National titles ==
Leccese has won individual national championship twice.

- 1 win in 100 metres (1951)
- 1 win in 200 metres (1950)

== See also ==
- Italy national relay team
