= Fernand Linssen =

Belgian sprinter

Personal information
- Nationality: Belgian
- Born: 14 October 1928
- Died: 19 June 2011 (aged 82)

Sport
- Sport: Sprinting
- Event: 200 metres

Fernand Linssen (14 October 1928 – 19 June 2011) was a Belgian sprinter. He competed in the 200 metres at the 1948 Summer Olympics and the 1952 Summer Olympics.
