= Hector Gosset =

Belgian sprinter

Personal information
- Nationality: Belgian
- Born: 9 September 1926
- Died: 27 October 2007 (aged 81)

Sport
- Sport: Sprinting
- Event: 100 metres

Hector Gosset (9 September 1926 – 27 October 2007) was a Belgian sprinter. He competed in the men's 100 metres at the 1948 Summer Olympics.
