= René Bonino =

French sprinter

Medal record

Men's athletics

Representing France

European Championships
Silver medal – second place	1954 Bern	100 m

René Bonino (14 January 1930 – 17 August 2016) was a French sprinter who competed in the 1952 and 1956 Summer Olympics. He died on 18 August 2016 at the age of 86 .

== Competition record ==
Year	Competition	Venue	Position	Event	Notes
Representing France
1952	Olympics	Helsinki, Finland	3rd, Heat 11	100 m	11.00/10.9
