= František Brož (athlete) =

Czech sprinter (1929–2018)

Personal information
- Nationality: Czechoslovak
- Born: 14 July 1929 Plzeň, Czechoslovakia
- Died: 1 January 2018 (aged 88) Prague, Czech Republic

Sport
- Sport: Sprinting
- Event: 100 metres

František Brož (14 July 1929 – 1 January 2018) was a Czechoslovak sprinter. He competed in the men's 100 metres at the 1952 Summer Olympics. He died in Prague on 1 January 2018, at the age of 88.
