= László Zarándi =

Hungarian sprinter (1929–2023)

Medal record

Men's athletics

Representing Hungary

Olympic Games
Bronze medal – third place	1952 Helsinki	4×100 m

European Championships
Gold medal – first place	1954 Bern	4×100 m

László Zarándi (10 June 1929 – 14 August 2023) was a Hungarian athlete who mainly competed in the 100 metres. He was born in Kiskunfélegyháza.

Zarándi began his career in sport in 1946/47 as a football player in the team of SZVSE. At the high school he continued to play football, but trained also in athletics: 100 metre and high jump. In 1950 he was elected in the national team of Hungary for 4 × 100 metres relay. He competed for Hungary at the 1952 Summer Olympics held in Helsinki, Finland where he won the bronze medal in the men's 4 × 100 metres relay with his teammates Géza Varasdi, György Csányi and Béla Goldoványi. Together with the same team, he won the gold medal on 29 August 1954 in Bern, at the European Championship of Athletics in the men 4 × 100 metres relay.

From 1952 he taught at the High School for Physical Education and trained jumpers like László Szalma (fourth place at the Olympic Games in 1980) and Dragán Ivanov.

László Zarándi died on 14 August 2023, at the age of 94.
