= Angel Gavrilov =

Bulgarian sprinter

Personal information
- Nationality: Bulgarian
- Born: 24 September 1927

Sport
- Sport: Sprinting
- Event: 100 metres

Angel Gavrilov (born 24 September 1927) is a Bulgarian former sprinter. He competed in the men's 100 metres at the 1952 Summer Olympics.
