= Pétur Sigurðsson (athlete) =

Icelandic sprinter (1928–2002)

Personal information
- Full name: Pétur Friðrik Sigurðsson
- Nationality: Icelandic
- Born: 16 July 1928 Reykjavík, Iceland
- Died: 19 September 2002 (aged 74)

Sport
- Sport: Sprinting
- Event: 100 metres

Pétur Sigurðsson (16 July 1928 – 19 September 2002) was an Icelandic sprinter. He competed in the men's 100 metres at the 1952 Summer Olympics.
