= Jan Carlsson =

Swedish sprinter

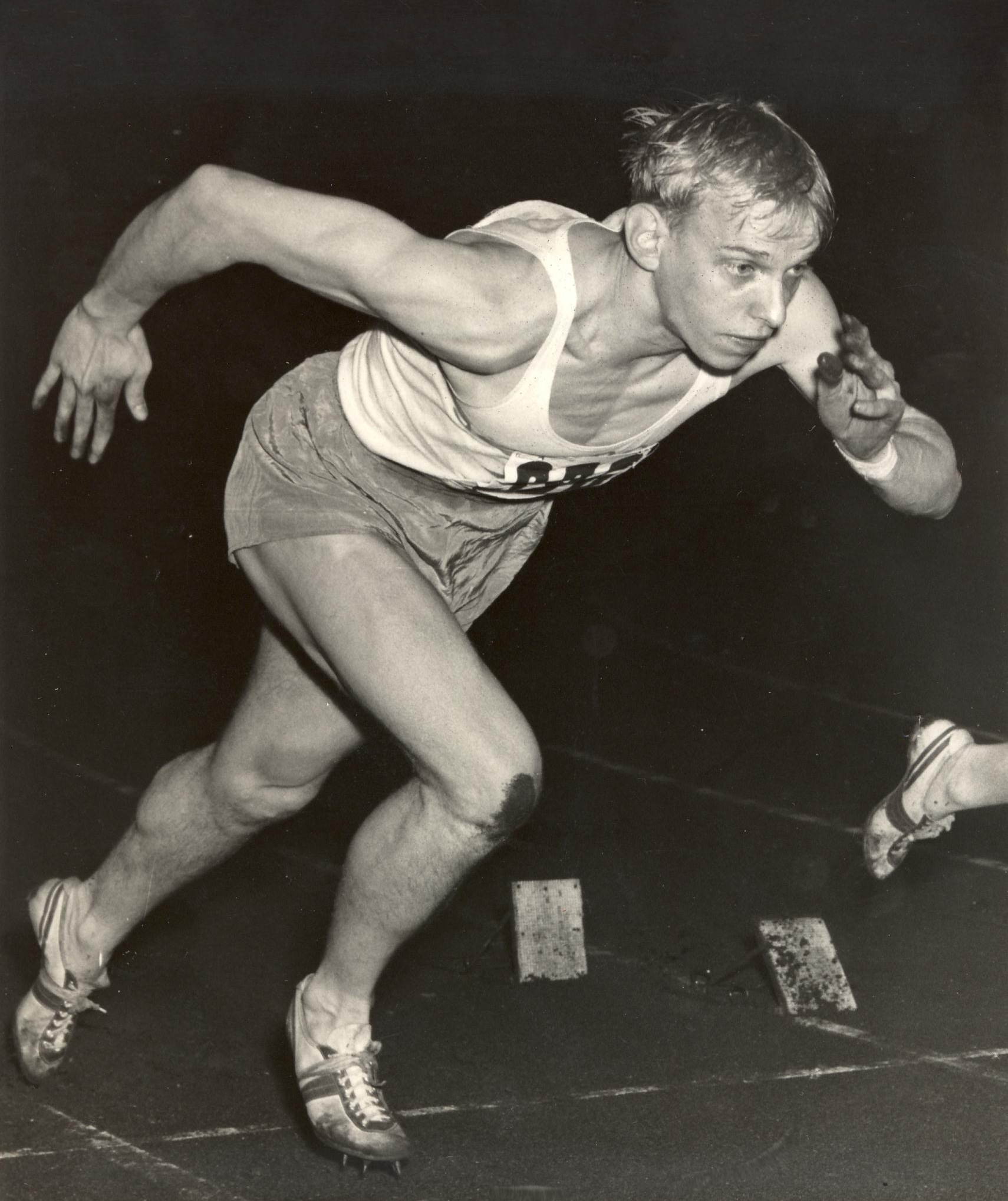

Personal information
- Born: 10 October 1930 Gothenburg, Sweden
- Died: 16 January 1979 (aged 48) Göteborg, Sweden

Sport
- Sport: Athletics
- Event: Sprint
- Club: IFK Göteborg

Achievements and titles
- Personal best(s): 100 m – 10.6 (1954); 200 m – 21.2 (1956); 400 m – 48.5
Medal record
Men's athletics
Representing Sweden
Finland–Sweden International
Gold medal – first place	1953 Stockholm	4 × 100 m relay
Gold medal – first place	1954 Helsinki	4 × 100 m relay
Gold medal – first place	1954 Helsinki	200 m
Silver medal – second place	1954 Helsinki	100 m
Gold medal – first place	1955 Stockholm	4 × 100 m relay
Bronze medal – third place	1955 Stockholm	100 m
Bronze medal – third place	1955 Stockholm	200 m
Bronze medal – third place	1955 Stockholm	110 m hurdles
Silver medal – second place	1956 Helsinki	200 m

Jan Carlsson (10 October 1930 – 16 January 1979) was a Swedish sprinter who won the national titles in the 100 m in 1954 and in the 200 m in 1953–55. He placed fifth in these events at the 1954 European Athletics Championships, and held a Swedish record over 400 m.

Carlsson attended the University of Michigan where he competed for the Michigan Wolverines track and field team. He was injured at the 1957 Big Ten Track and Field Championships. He won several races for the Wolverines.

He won a gold medal at the 1953 Finland–Sweden Athletics International in the 4 × 100 metres relay. He also placed 4th in the 100 m and 5th in the 200 m. The following year, he won a gold medal in the 200 m and silver in the 100 m, while repeating as 4 × 100 m winner. He won the 4 × 100 m a third time in 1955 alongside bronze in the 100 m, 200 m, and 110 metres hurdles, and won a 200 m silver in 1956.

Representing the club IFK Göteborg, Carlsson was designated as Stor Grabb #170.
