= Václav Janeček =

Czech sprinter

Personal information
- Nationality: Czech
- Born: 9 March 1929 Horní Suchá, Czechoslovakia
- Died: 23 January 1991 (aged 61)

Sport
- Sport: Sprinting
- Event: 200 metres

Václav Janeček (9 March 1929 – 23 January 1991) was a Czech sprinter.

== Career ==
He competed in the 200 metres at the 1952 Summer Olympics and the 1956 Summer Olympics.
