= Theo Saat =

Dutch sprinter

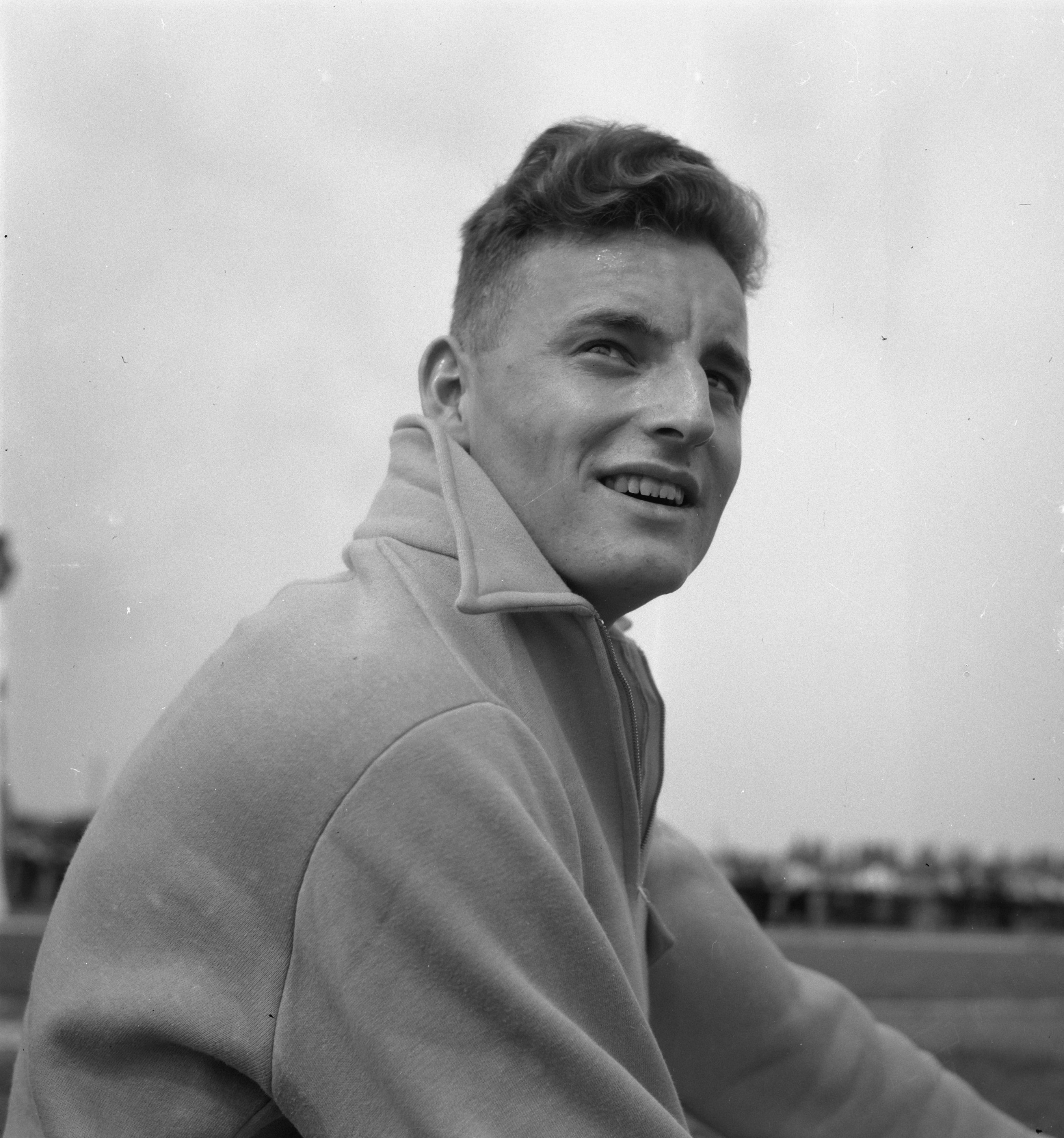
- Theo Saat in 1950

Personal information
- Born: 13 May 1928 Arnhem, Netherlands
- Died: 2 June 2015 (aged 87) Noordwijk, Netherlands

Sport
- Sport: Sprint
- Club: V&L, Den Haag

Theodorus Antoon "Theo" Saat (13 May 1928 – 2 June 2015) was a Dutch sprinter.

Saat competed at the 1952 Summer Olympics in the 100 m and 200 m events, but failed to reach the finals. At the 1954 European Athletics Championships he finished in sixth place in the 100 m; he was also part of the Dutch team that set a national record in the 4 × 100 m relay in the preliminaries. He died in Noordwijk in 2015.

== Results ==
Games	Age	City	Country	Class	Phase	Rank	Time (Hand)	Time (automatic)
1952 Summer	24	Helsinki	Netherlands	Men's 100 metres	Semi-Finals	6	10.8	11.12
1952 Summer	24	Helsinki	Netherlands	Men's 100 metres	Quarter-Finals	2	10.6	10.93
1952 Summer	24	Helsinki	Netherlands	Men's 100 metres	Round One	2	10.9	11.02
1952 Summer	24	Helsinki	Netherlands	Men's 200 metres	Quarter-Finals	3	21.7	21.87
1952 Summer	24	Helsinki	Netherlands	Men's 200 metres	Round One	1	22.0	22.17
