= McDonald Bailey =

British/Trinidadian track Olympian athlete

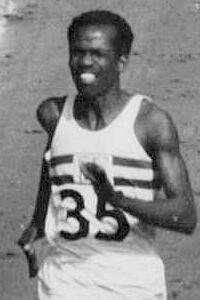

Personal information
- Nationality: British/Trinidadian
- Born: 8 December 1920 Williamsville, Trinidad and Tobago
- Died: 4 December 2013 (aged 92) Port of Spain, Trinidad and Tobago
- Height: 180 cm (5 ft 11 in)
- Weight: 65 kg (143 lb)

Sport
- Sport: Athletics
- Event: Sprints
- Club: RAF; Polytechnic Harriers

Achievements and titles
- Olympic finals: 1948 London; 1952 Helsinki
Medal record
Men's Athletics
Representing Great Britain
Bronze medal – third place	1952 Helsinki	100 metres

Emmanuel McDonald Bailey (8 December 1920 – 4 December 2013) was a British and Trinidadian athlete, who was born in Williamsville, Trinidad and Tobago and competed at two Olympic Games.

== Biography ==
In March 1946, Bailey won a bronze medal in the 1946 Central American and Caribbean Games. He followed this by becoming both the British 100 yards champion and the British 220 yards champion after winning the British AAA Championships titles at the 1946 AAA Championships.

Bailey repeated his AAA success at both the 1947 AAA Championships before he represented the Great Britain team at the 1948 Olympic Games in London, where he finished sixth and last in the final.

Bailey recorded the impressive feat of winning the double of 100 and 220 yards at every AAA Championship from 1949 to 1953 bringing his title count to 14 senior sprint titles (a record still held as of 2025).

In between the title wins Bailey went to another Olympic Games, representing the Great Britain team at the 1952 Olympic Games in Helsinki, where he won the bronze medal.

He jointly held the 100 m world record at 10.2 seconds between 1951 and 1956 and won the sprint double seven times at the AAA Championships. In the 1948/9 season he worked on fitness and speed with Queen's Park Rangers F.C. who won their first ever promotion that season, from Football League 3rd Division South to Football League 2nd Division.

In 1953 he joined rugby League club Leigh, but he only played in one friendly match for them.

in 1977 Bailey was awarded Trinidad and Tobago's Chaconia Medal (Gold).

== Competition record ==
Year	Competition	Venue	Position	Event	Notes
Representing Great Britain
1948	Olympics	London, England	6th	100 m	
1952	Olympics	Helsinki, Finland	3rd	100 m	10.83/10.4
