= Yves Camus =

French sprinter (1930–2025)

Medal record

Men's athletics

Representing France

European Championships
Silver medal – second place	1950 Brussels	4×100 m

Yves Roger Maurice Camus (13 May 1930 – 27 June 2025) was a French sprinter who competed in the 1952 Summer Olympics and in the 1956 Summer Olympics. He was born in Nantes.
