= Willy Eichenberger =

Swiss sprinter (1928–1999)

Personal information
- Nationality: Swiss
- Born: 24 May 1928 Bergdietikon, Switzerland
- Died: 14 September 1999 (aged 71) Bergdietikon, Switzerland

Sport
- Sport: Sprinting
- Event: 200 metres

Willy Eichenberger (24 May 1928 – 14 September 1999) was a Swiss sprinter. He competed in the men's 200 metres at the 1952 Summer Olympics. Eichenberger died in Bergdietikon on 14 September 1999, at the age of 71.
