= Ásmundur Bjarnason =

Icelandic sprinter (1927–2024)

Personal information
- Nationality: Icelandic
- Born: 17 February 1927 Akureyri, Kingdom of Iceland
- Died: 1 February 2024 (aged 96) Húsavík, Iceland
- Spouse: Kristrún J. Karlsdóttir
- Children: 7

Sport
- Sport: Sprinting
- Event: 100 metres

Ásmundur Bjarnason (17 February 1927 – 1 February 2024) was an Icelandic sprinter. He competed at the 1948 Summer Olympics and in the men's 100 metres at the 1952 Summer Olympics. Bjarnason died in Húsavík on 1 February 2024, at the age of 96.
