= Levan Sanadze =

Georgian sprinter (1928–1998)

Personal information
- Full name: Levan Georgiyevich Sanadze
- Nationality: Georgian
- Born: 16 August 1928 Tiflis, Georgian Soviet Socialist Republic, Soviet Union
- Died: 24 August 1998 (aged 70) Moscow, Russia

Sport
- Sport: Athletics
Medal record
Men's athletics
Representing the Soviet Union
Olympic Games
Silver medal – second place	1952 Helsinki	4×100 m
European Championships
Gold medal – first place	1950 Brussels	4×100 m
Bronze medal – third place	1954 Bern	4×100 m

Levan Georgiyevich Sanadze (Georgian: ლევან სანაძე, Russian: Леван Санадзе; 16 August 1928 – 24 August 1998) was a Georgian sprinter. Domestically, he had represented the sports club Nauka Tbilisi and would win two titles in the men's 4 x 100 metres relay at the Soviet Championships alongside his teammates. He would compete at the 1951 World Festival of Youth and Students and 1954 World Student Games, winning two silvers in the 100 metres and two golds in the men's 4 x 100 metres relay.

At the 1952 Summer Olympics, he would compete in the men's 100 metres, men's 200 metres, and men's 4 × 100 metres relay. He would not advance to the finals for the two former races but would win the silver in the relay alongside his teammates. Among his other medals would be a gold and bronze medal in the men's 4 × 100 metres relay at two editions of the European Athletics Championships. He later served as the head of the athletics department at the Physical Culture and Sports Committee of the Soviet Union during the 1980s.

== Biography ==
Levan Georgiyevich Sanadze was born on 16 August 1928 in what was then known as Tiflis in the Georgian Soviet Socialist Republic of the Soviet Union. Domestically, he had represented the sports club Nauka Tbilisi. As part of the club, he would compete at the 1948 Soviet Championships alongside his teammates in the 4 x 100 metres relay and win the event.

Two years later, he would represent the Soviet Union at the 1950 European Athletics Championships in Brussels. There, alongside his teammates, would win the men's 4 × 100 metres relay and win gold. The following year he would compete at the 1951 World Festival of Youth and Students in Berlin individually and as part of the relay team. He would win the silver medal in the 100 metres while placed first in the men's 4 × 100 metres relay.

He would compete in his first and only Olympic Games at the 1952 Summer Olympics in Helsinki. Sanadze would first compete in the heats of the men's 100 metres on 20 July against five other athletes. He would place third in his heat with a time of 11.13 seconds and not advance further. Two days later, he would compete in the heats of the men's 200 metres against three other athletes. He would place second in his heat with a time of 22.26 seconds and advance to the quarterfinals. With four other competitors in his quarterfinal, he would place fourth with a time of 22.26 seconds again and not advance further.

A few days later, he would be part of the Soviet Union's men's 4 × 100 metres relay team. In the heats, they would place first with a time of 41.3 and advance to the semifinals. They would then record a time of 40.7 seconds in the semifinals and would advance to the finals. In the finals, they would place second and earn the silver medal with a time of 40.3 seconds. In the same year, he and his teammates would win the men's 4 x 100 metres relay at the 1952 Soviet Championships.

At the 1954 World Student Games, he would win the silver medal in the men's 100 metres and a gold alongside his teammates in the men's 4 x 100 metres relay. He would also compete at the 1954 European Athletics Championships in Bern, where he would win a bronze alongside his teammates in the men's 4 x 100 metres relay. After his career, he served as the head of the athletics department at the Physical Culture and Sports Committee of the Soviet Union during the 1980s. Sanadze would die on 24 August 1998 in Moscow, Russia.
