= Hans Wehrli =

Swiss athlete

Personal information
- Nationality: Swiss
- Born: 19 March 1927
- Died: 16 October 2011 (aged 84)

Sport
- Sport: Sprinting
- Event: 100 metres

Hans Wehrli (19 March 1927 – 16 October 2011) was a Swiss sprinter. He competed in the men's 100 metres at the 1952 Summer Olympics.

== Competition record ==
| Year | Competition | Venue | Position | Event | Notes |
Representing Switzerland
| 1952 | Olympics | Helsinki, Finland | 5th, Qtr 2 | 100 m | 11.05/10.8 |
