= Athletics at the 1958 British Empire and Commonwealth Games – Men's 100 yards =

Men's 100 yards at the 1958 British Empire and Commonwealth Games
- Venue: Cardiff Arms Park
- Date: 17-19 July
- Competitors: 60 from 24 nations
- Winning time: 9.66

Medalists
gold medal	Keith Gardner	Jamaica
silver medal	Tom Robinson	Bahamas
bronze medal	Mike Agostini	Trinidad and Tobago

The men's 100 yards event at the 1958 British Empire and Commonwealth Games was held on 17 and 19 July at the Cardiff Arms Park in Cardiff, Wales.

== Results ==
=== Heats ===
Qualification: First 3 in each heat (Q) qualify directly for the quarterfinals.

Wind:
Heat 1: +1.1 m/s, Heat 9: +3.7 m/s, Heat 12: +0.5 m/s

Rank	Heat	Name	Nationality	Time	Notes
1	1	Tom Robinson	Bahamas	9.5	Q, GR
2	1	Hector Hogan	Australia	9.8	Q
3	1	Joe Goddard	Trinidad and Tobago	9.9	Q
4	1	D. Doherty	Sierra Leone	10.4	
	1	Ghulam Raziq	Pakistan	DQ	
1	2	Jimmy Omagbemi	Nigeria	9.7	Q
2	2	Gavin Carragher	Scotland	10.0	Q
3	2	Dewi Roberts	Wales	10.1	Q
4	2	Muhammad Sharif Butt	Pakistan	10.2	
5	2	Dursley Stott	Isle of Man	10.5	
1	3	Maurice Rae	New Zealand	9.8	Q
2	3	Adrian Breacker	England	9.9	Q
3	3	Richard Ampadu	Ghana	10.0	Q
4	3	Ignatius Okello	Uganda	10.3	
5	3	Gordon Hamilton	Northern Ireland	10.4	
1	4	Peter Radford	England	9.8	Q
2	4	Stuart Cameron	Canada	10.0	Q
3	4	Ben Nduga	Uganda	10.0	Q
4	4	Seraphino Antao	Kenya	10.0	
5	4	Joseph Lee Gut-Hing	Sarawak	10.5	
1	5	Ronald Jones	Wales	9.9	Q
2	5	Stanley Levenson	Canada	9.9	Q
3	5	Smart Akraka	Nigeria	9.9	Q
4	5	Erasmus Amukun	Uganda	9.9	
5	5	Ivan Mayers	British Guiana	10.3	
1	6	Gordon Day	South Africa	9.9	Q
2	6	Abdul Khaliq	Pakistan	9.9	Q
3	6	Victor Odofin	Nigeria	9.9	Q
4	6	Samuel Chemweno	Kenya	10.1	
5	6	James Edgar	Scotland	10.5	
1	7	David Segal	England	9.9	Q
2	7	Hendrickson Harewood	Trinidad and Tobago	10.2	Q
3	7	Peter Stanger	Canada	10.2	Q
4	7	Augustus Lawson	Ghana	10.2	
5	7	Peter Street	Northern Ireland	10.3	
1	8	Edward Jeffreys	South Africa	9.8	Q
2	8	Nick Whitehead	Wales	9.9	Q
3	8	Momo Lansana	Sierra Leone	10.3	Q
4	8	Kipkorir Boit Kibet	Kenya	10.5	
5	8	T. E. Patel	Mauritius	11.2	
1	9	Mike Agostini	Trinidad and Tobago	9.7	Q
2	9	Thomas Obi	Nigeria	9.8	Q
3	9	Terrance Gale	Australia	10.1	Q
4	9	Bob Cockburn	Scotland	10.2	
5	9	Lloyd Anderson	Saint Vincent and the Grenadines	10.3	
1	10	Keith Gardner	Jamaica	9.7	Q
2	10	Roy Sandstrom	England	10.0	Q
3	10	Paddy Toner	Northern Ireland	10.1	Q
4	10	S. Bwowe	Uganda	10.3	
5	10	Henry Kennedy-Skipton	Hong Kong	10.4	
1	11	Allan Dunbar	Scotland	10.0	Q
2	11	Tan Eng Yoon	Singapore	10.1	Q
3	11	John Luxon	South Africa	10.4	Q
4	11	P. R. Hein	Mauritius	10.8	
1	12	John Morgan	Wales	10.0	Q
2	12	Jim McCann	Australia	10.1	Q
3	12	Edwin Solomon	British Guiana	10.2	Q
4	12	Charles Williams	Trinidad and Tobago	10.2	
5	12	Ronnie Chambers	Northern Ireland	10.2	

=== Quarterfinals ===
Qualification: First 2 in each heat (Q) qualify directly for the semifinals.

Wind:
Heat 1: 0.0 m/s, Heat 3: -1.4 m/s, Heat 5: -0.2 m/s

Rank	Heat	Name	Nationality	Time	Notes
1	1	Tom Robinson	Bahamas	9.6	Q
2	1	Abdul Khaliq	Pakistan	9.9	Q
3	1	David Segal	England	9.9	
4	1	Stuart Cameron	Canada	9.9	
5	1	Terrance Gale	Australia	10.0	
6	1	Richard Ampadu	Ghana	10.4	
1	2	Mike Agostini	Trinidad and Tobago	9.7	Q
2	2	Gordon Day	South Africa	9.8	Q
3	2	Smart Akraka	Nigeria	9.8	
4	2	Adrian Breacker	England	9.8	
5	2	Ben Nduga	Uganda	10.0	
6	2	Tan Eng Yoon	Singapore	10.3	
1	3	Jimmy Omagbemi	Nigeria	9.7	Q
2	3	Roy Sandstrom	England	9.9	Q
3	3	Joseph Whitehead	Wales	10.0	
4	3	Jim McCann	Australia	10.2	
5	3	Paddy Toner	Northern Ireland	10.5	
6	3	John Luxon	South Africa	10.5	
1	4	Maurice Rae	New Zealand	9.8	Q
2	4	Victor Odofin	Nigeria	9.9	Q
3	4	Joe Goddard	Trinidad and Tobago	10.0	
4	4	John Morgan	Wales	10.0	
5	4	Edwin Solomon	British Guiana	10.0	
6	4	Gavin Carragher	Scotland	10.2	
1	5	Peter Radford	England	9.7	Q
2	5	Hector Hogan	Australia	9.9	Q
3	5	Thomas Obi	Nigeria	10.0	
4	5	Dewi Roberts	Wales	10.1	
5	5	Peter Stanger	Canada	10.2	
6	5	Momo Lansana	Sierra Leone	10.4	
1	6	Keith Gardner	Jamaica	9.5	Q, GR
2	6	Edward Jeffreys	South Africa	9.6	Q
3	6	Stanley Levenson	Canada	9.8	
4	6	Ronald Jones	Wales	10.0	
5	6	Allan Dunbar	Scotland	10.0	
6	6	Hendrickson Harewood	Trinidad and Tobago	10.1	

=== Semifinals ===
Qualification: First 3 in each heat (Q) qualify directly for the final.

Wind:
Heat 1: -3.9 m/s, Heat 2: ? m/s

Rank	Heat	Name	Nationality	Time	Notes
1	1	Tom Robinson	Bahamas	9.5	Q, =GR
2	1	Jimmy Omagbemi	Nigeria	9.6	Q
3	1	Mike Agostini	Trinidad and Tobago	9.7	Q
4	1	Edward Jeffreys	South Africa	9.7	
5	1	Hector Hogan	Australia	9.7	
6	1	Roy Sandstrom	England	9.8	
1	2	Keith Gardner	Jamaica	9.6	Q
2	2	Peter Radford	England	9.8	Q
3	2	Gordon Day	South Africa	9.8	Q
4	2	Maurice Rae	New Zealand	9.8	
5	2	Victor Odofin	Nigeria	9.8	
6	2	Abdul Khaliq	Pakistan	9.8	

=== Final ===
Rank	Lane	Name	Nationality	Time	Notes
1st place, gold medalist(s)	1	Keith Gardner	Jamaica	9.66	GR
2nd place, silver medalist(s)	5	Tom Robinson	Bahamas	9.69	
3rd place, bronze medalist(s)	6	Mike Agostini	Trinidad and Tobago	9.79	
4	4	Peter Radford	England	9.7	
5	3	Jimmy Omagbemi	Nigeria	9.7	
6	2	Gordon Day	South Africa	9.8	
