= Athletics at the 1958 British Empire and Commonwealth Games – Men's 4 × 110 yards relay =

Men's 4 × 110 yards relay at the Commonwealth Games

The men's 4 × 110 yards relay event at the 1958 British Empire and Commonwealth Games was held on 26 July at the Cardiff Arms Park in Cardiff, Wales.

== Medalists ==
Gold	Silver	Bronze
England; Peter Radford; Roy Sandstrom; David Segal; Adrian Breacker	Nigeria; Thomas Obi; Jimmy Omagbemi; Victor Odofin; Smart Akrara	Australia; Jim McCann; Hector Hogan; Terry Gale; Kevan Gosper

== Results ==
=== Heats ===
Qualification: First 3 teams of each heat (Q) qualified directly for the final.

Rank	Heat	Nation	Athletes	Time	Notes
1	1	England	Peter Radford, Roy Sandstrom, David Segal, Adrian Breacker	40.9	Q, GR, NR
2	1	Australia	Jim McCann, Hector Hogan, Terry Gale, Kevan Gosper	42.3	Q
3	1	Uganda	Erasmus Amukun, Ben Nduga, S. Bwowe, Ignatius Okello	42.4	Q
4	1	Trinidad and Tobago	Hendrickson Harewood, Charles Williams, Clifton Bertrand, Joe Goddard	42.5	
5	1	Northern Ireland	Paddy Toner, Gordon Hamilton, Peter Street, Ronnie Chambers	43.0	
1	2	Nigeria	Thomas Obi, Jimmy Omagbemi, Victor Odofin, Smart Akrara	41.6	Q
2	2	Canada	Stuart Cameron, Stanley Levenson, Peter Stanger, Mike Agostini	42.2	Q
3	2	Wales	Ron Jones, Nick Whitehead, Dewi Roberts, John Morgan	42.5	Q
4	2	Kenya	Seraphino Antao, Bartonjo Rotich, Samuel Chemweno, Kipkorir Boit Kibet	43.0	

=== Final ===
Rank	Lane	Nation	Athletes	Time	Notes
1st place, gold medalist(s)	2	England	Peter Radford, Roy Sandstrom, David Segal, Adrian Breacker	40.72	GR, AR
2nd place, silver medalist(s)	4	Nigeria	Thomas Obi, Jimmy Omagbemi, Victor Odofin, Smart Akrara	41.05	
3rd place, bronze medalist(s)	3	Australia	Jim McCann, Hector Hogan, Terry Gale, Kevan Gosper	41.64	
4	1	Canada	Stuart Cameron, Stanley Levenson, Peter Stanger, Mike Agostini	41.7	
5	5	Wales	Ron Jones, Nick Whitehead, Dewi Roberts, John Morgan	42.0	
6	6	Uganda	Erasmus Amukun, Ben Nduga, S. Bwowe, Ignatius Okello	42.1	
