= Athletics at the 1952 Summer Olympics – Men's pole vault =

Men's pole vault at the Games of the XV Olympiad
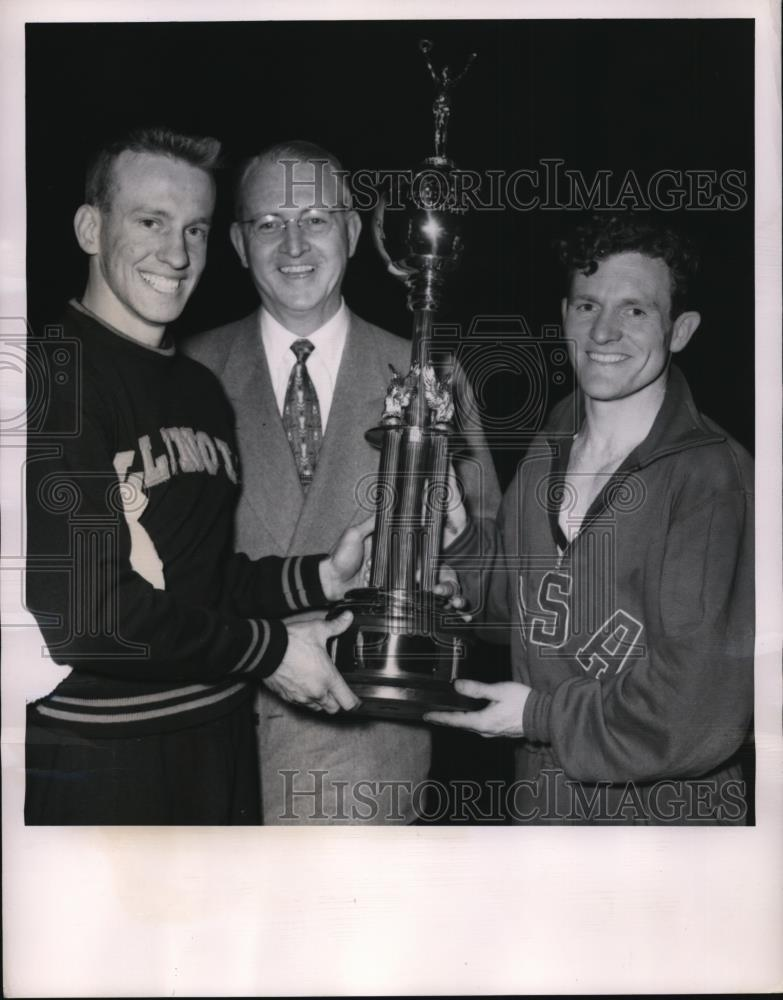
- Don Laz and Bob Richards (1951)
- Venue: Helsinki Olympic Stadium
- Dates: July 21, 1952 (qualifying); July 22, 1952 (final)
- Competitors: 28 from 18 nations
- Winning height: 4.55 OR

Medalists
1st place, gold medalist(s)		Bob Richards; United States
2nd place, silver medalist(s)		Don Laz; United States
3rd place, bronze medalist(s)		Ragnar Lundberg; Sweden

Video on YouTube amateur film

The men's pole vault was an event at the 1952 Summer Olympics in Helsinki, Finland. Twenty-eight athletes from 18 nations competed. The maximum number of athletes per nation had been set at 3 since the 1930 Olympic Congress. The final was held on Tuesday July 22, 1952. The event was won by Bob Richards of the United States, the nation's 12th consecutive victory in the men's pole vault. Another American, Don Laz, took silver. Ragnar Lundberg's bronze was Sweden's first medal in the event since 1912.

== Summary ==
Bob Richards was the returning bronze medalist. His closest domestic competitor was Don Laz, who shared the US championship earlier in the year after 4 years of Richards dominance. In the final both remained clean to 4.40m, just ahead of Ragnar Lundberg and Petro Denysenko, who each had one miss earlier. Lundberg had passed at 4.10m, which became significant because neither could go any higher. While modern rules would make that a tie, in that era, the third tiebreaker was the number of attempts, which gave Lundberg the bronze medal. Both Richards and Laz cleared the next height, 4.50m on their second attempts, still tied. They remained tied to their final attempt at 4.60 m (15 ft 1 in) when Laz missed and Richards cleared it to take his first gold medal.

Richards was only the second man to win multiple medals in the pole vault. He would go on to defend the championship four years later, jumping 1 cm higher and went on to Wheaties box fame. No other man has defended the pole vault title, though Yelena Isinbayeva defended the women's title in 2008. Richards is also the only man to win three medals in the event (Isinbayeva is the only woman to do so).

== Background ==
This was the 12th appearance of the event, which is one of 12 athletics events to have been held at every Summer Olympics. Half of the finalists from the 1948 Games returned: silver medalist Erkki Kataja of Finland, bronze medalist Bob Richards of the United States, fourth-place finisher Erling Kaas of Norway, fifth-place finisher Ragnar Lundberg of Sweden, seventh-place finisher Valto Olenius of Finland, and ninth-place finisher José Vicente of Puerto Rico. Richards was the favorite in Helsinki after four wins at the AAU championships from 1949 to 1952 (the last tied with Don Laz). The most significant challenger to the Americans was European champion Ragnar Lundberg of Sweden.

Egypt, Romania, the Soviet Union, and Switzerland each made their first appearance in the event. The United States made its 12th appearance, the only nation to have competed at every Olympic men's pole vault to that point.

== Competition format ==
The competition used the two-round format introduced in 1912, with results cleared between rounds. Vaulters received three attempts at each height. Ties were broken by the countback rule; at the time, total attempts was used after total misses.

In the qualifying round, the bar was set at 3.60 metres, 3.80 metres, 3.90 metres, and 4.00 metres. All vaulters clearing 4.00 metres advanced to the final.

In the final, the bar was set at 3.60 metres, 3.80 metres, 3.95 metres, 4.10 metres, 4.20 metres, 4.30 metres, 4.40 metres, 4.50 metres, 4.55 metres, and 4.60 metres.

== Records ==
Prior to this competition, the existing world and Olympic records were as follows.

World record	Cornelius Warmerdam (USA)	4.77	Modesto, United States	23 May 1942
Olympic record	Earle Meadows (USA)	4.35	Berlin, Germany	5 August 1936

Bob Richards, Don Laz, Ragnar Lundberg, and Petro Denysenko all cleared 4.40 metres to break the Olympic record. Richards and Laz extended the record to 4.50 metres. Only Richards was able to clear 4.55 metres, the new Olympic record at the end of the Games.

== Schedule ==
All times are Eastern European Summer Time (UTC+3)

The final took nearly 6 hours.

Date	Time	Round
Monday, 21 July 1952	15:00	Qualifying
Tuesday, 22 July 1952	15:00	Final

== Results ==
Key

- o = Height cleared
- x = Height failed
- – = Height passed
- r = Retired
- SB = Season's best
- PB = Personal best
- NR = National record
- AR = Area record
- OR = Olympic record
- WR = World record
- WL = World lead
- NM = No mark
- DNS = Did not start
- DQ = Disqualified

=== Qualifying round ===
Qualification Criteria: Qualifying Performance 4.00 m advance to the Final.

Rank	Group	Athlete	Nation	3.60	3.80	3.90	4.00	Height	Notes
1	A	Petro Denysenko	Soviet Union	—	—	o	o	4.00	Q
1	A	Tamás Homonnay	Hungary	—	—	o	o	4.00	Q
1	B	Erkki Kataja	Finland	—	—	o	o	4.00	Q
1	B	Ragnar Lundberg	Sweden	—	—	o	o	4.00	Q
1	B	Jukka Piironen	Finland	—	—	o	o	4.00	Q
6	A	Zeno Dragomir	Romania	—	o	o	o	4.00	Q
6	B	Don Laz	United States	—	o	o	o	4.00	Q
6	B	Lennart Lind	Sweden	—	o	o	o	4.00	Q
6	B	George Mattos	United States	—	o	o	o	4.00	Q
6	B	Bob Richards	United States	—	o	o	o	4.00	Q
11	A	Rigas Efstathiadis	Greece	?	?	?	o	4.00	Q, one miss before 4.00
11	B	Erling Kaas	Norway	?	?	?	o	4.00	Q, one miss before 4.00
13	B	Valto Olenius	Finland	—	—	—	xo	4.00	Q
14	B	Viktor Knyazev	Soviet Union	—	—	o	xo	4.00	Q
15	A	Volodymyr Brazhnyk	Soviet Union	—	o	o	xo	4.00	Q
16	A	Theodosios Balafas	Greece	o	o	o	xo	4.00	Q
16	A	Torfy Bryngeirsson	Iceland	o	o	o	xo	4.00	Q
18	B	Bunkichi Sawada	Japan	—	?	?	xo	4.00	Q, one miss before 4.00
19	B	Milan Milakov	Yugoslavia	—	o	o	xxo	4.00	Q
20	A	Walter Hofstetter	Switzerland	?	?	o	xxx	3.90	One miss before 3.90
21	B	Ron Miller	Canada	—	o	xo	xxx	3.90	
22	A	Tim Anderson	Great Britain	o	o	xxx	—N/a	3.80	
22	A	Geoff Elliott	Great Britain	o	o	xxx	—N/a	3.80	
22	B	Zenon Ważny	Poland	o	o	xxx	—N/a	3.80	
25	A	Helcio da Silva	Brazil	o	xxx	—N/a		3.60	
26	A	Gamal El-Din El-Sherbini	Egypt	xxo	xxx	—N/a		3.60	
—	B	Georgios Roubanis	Greece	xxx	—N/a			NM	
—	B	José Vicente	Puerto Rico	xxx	—N/a			NM	
—	–	Jorge Aguilera	Mexico	—N/a				DNS	
—	–	Franz Fritz	Austria	—N/a				DNS	
—	–	Georges Breitman	France	—N/a				DNS	
—	–	Edward Adamczyk	Poland	—N/a				DNS	

=== Final ===
The final was held on July 22.

Rank	Athlete	Nation	3.60	3.80	3.95	4.10	4.20	4.30	4.40	4.50	4.55	4.60	Height	Notes
1st place, gold medalist(s)	Bob Richards	United States	—	—	o	o	o	o	o	xo	xxo	xxx	4.55	OR
2nd place, silver medalist(s)	Don Laz	United States	—	—	o	o	o	o	o	xo	xxx	—N/a	4.50	
3rd place, bronze medalist(s)	Ragnar Lundberg	Sweden	—	—	o	—	o	xo	o	xxx	—N/a		4.40	
4	Petro Denysenko	Soviet Union	—	—	o	o	xo	o	o	xxx	—N/a		4.40	
5	Valto Olenius	Finland	—	—	—	o	xo	xo	xxx	—N/a			4.30	
6	Bunkichi Sawada	Japan	—	o	xxo	o	o	xxx	—N/a				4.20	
7	Volodymyr Brazhnyk	Soviet Union	—	o	o	o	xo	xxx	—N/a				4.20	
8	Viktor Knyazev	Soviet Union	—	o	o	xo	xo	xxx	—N/a				4.20	
9	George Mattos	United States	—	—	o	xo	xxo	xxx	—N/a				4.20	
10	Erkki Kataja	Finland	—	—	o	o	xxx	—N/a					4.10	
11	Tamás Homonnay	Hungary	—	o	o	o	xxx	—N/a					4.10	
11	Lennart Lind	Sweden	—	o	O	o	xxx	—N/a					4.10	
13	Milan Milakov	Yugoslavia	—	o	xo	xo	xxx	—N/a					4.10	
14	Rigas Efstathiadis	Greece	—	o	o	xxx	—N/a						3.95	
14	Torfy Bryngeirsson	Iceland	—	o	o	xxx	—N/a						3.95	
16	Erling Kaas	Norway	—	o	xxx	—N/a							3.80	
17	Theodosios Balafas	Greece	o	o	xxx	—N/a							3.80	
18	Jukka Piironen	Finland	—	xo	xxx	—N/a							3.80	
18	Zeno Dragomir	Romania	—	xo	xxx	—N/a							3.80	
