= Athletics at the 1958 British Empire and Commonwealth Games – Men's 220 yards =

Men's 220 yards at the Commonwealth Games

The men's 220 yards event at the 1958 British Empire and Commonwealth Games was held on 22 and 24 July at the Cardiff Arms Park in Cardiff, Wales.

== Medalists ==
Gold	Silver	Bronze
Tom Robinson; Bahamas	Keith Gardner; Jamaica	Gordon Day; South Africa

== Results ==
=== Heats ===
Qualification: First 4 in each heat (Q) qualify directly for the quarterfinals.

Rank	Heat	Name	Nationality	Time	Notes
1	1	Keith Gardner	Jamaica	22.0	Q
2	1	Bill Henderson	Scotland	22.4	Q
3	1	Samuel Chemweno	Kenya	22.5	Q
4	1	G. Esan	Nigeria	22.5	Q
	1	Joe Goddard	Trinidad and Tobago	DNS	
	1	S. Bwowe	Uganda	DNS	
1	2	Tom Robinson	Bahamas	21.6	Q
2	2	John Jones	Wales	21.9	Q
3	2	Augustus Lawson	Ghana	22.3	Q
4	2	Ronnie Chambers	Northern Ireland	22.3	Q
5	2	Ignatius Okello	Uganda	22.4	
6	2	Francis Tommy	Sierra Leone	23.6	
1	3	Benjamin Nduga	Uganda	21.7	Q
2	3	Mike Agostini	Canada	22.2	Q
3	3	Terrance Gale	Australia	22.4	Q
4	3	Graham Fleck	Scotland	22.5	Q
5	3	Hendrickson Harewood	Trinidad and Tobago	22.9	
6	3	Lloyd Anderson	Saint Vincent and the Grenadines	23.2	
1	4	Stan Levenson	Canada	21.6	Q
2	4	David Segal	England	21.9	Q
3	4	Smart Akraka	Nigeria	22.4	Q
4	4	Peter Street	Northern Ireland	23.3	Q
5	4	D. Doherty	Sierra Leone	23.5	
	4	Basil Ince	Trinidad and Tobago	DNS	
1	5	Maurice Rae	New Zealand	22.1	Q
2	5	Seraphino Antao	Kenya	22.3	Q
3	5	Gerald James	Jamaica	23.0	Q
4	5	Bob Cockburn	Scotland	23.1	Q
5	5	I. Benjamin	Sierra Leone	23.4	
	5	John Morgan	Wales	DNS	
1	6	Clifton Bertrand	Trinidad and Tobago	22.1	Q
2	6	John Scott-Oldfield	England	22.1	Q
3	6	Abdul Khaliq	Pakistan	22.4	Q
4	6	Paddy Toner	Northern Ireland	22.6	Q
5	6	John Oliver	Wales	22.8	
	6	Godrey Roberts	Saint Vincent and the Grenadines	DNS	
1	7	Gordon Day	South Africa	21.9	Q
2	7	Peter Radford	England	22.1	Q
3	7	Muhammad Sharif Butt	Pakistan	22.8	Q
4	7	John Quartey	Ghana	23.1	Q
5	7	Ivan Mayers	British Guiana	23.3	
1	8	Edward Jeffreys	South Africa	21.4	Q
2	8	Erasmus Amukun	Uganda	22.0	Q
3	8	Edwin Solomon	British Guiana	22.5	Q
4	8	Doug Clement	Canada	22.5	Q
5	8	Dursley Stott	Isle of Man	23.9	
1	9	Robbie Brightwell	England	22.0	Q
2	9	Stuart Cameron	Canada	22.2	Q
3	9	Nick Whitehead	Wales	22.9	Q
4	9	Henry Kennedy-Skipton	Hong Kong	24.1	Q
	9	P. R. Hein	Mauritius	DNS	

=== Quarterfinals ===
Qualification: First 2 in each heat (Q) qualify directly for the semifinals.

Rank	Heat	Na9e	Nationality	Time	Notes
1	1	Keith Gardner	Jamaica	21.5	Q
2	1	Stuart Cameron	Canada	21.5	Q
3	1	Smart Akraka	Nigeria	22.0	
4	1	Augustus Lawson	Ghana	22.1	
5	1	Edwin Solomon	British Guiana	22.6	
6	1	Abdul Khaliq	Pakistan	23.4	
1	2	Edward Jeffreys	South Africa	21.2	Q, =GR
2	2	David Segal	England	21.4	Q
3	2	Joseph Whitehead	Wales	22.0	
4	2	Ronnie Chambers	Northern Ireland	22.4	
5	2	Benjamin Nduga	Uganda	22.5	
6	2	Bill Henderson	Scotland	23.0	
1	3	Robbie Brightwell	England	21.5	Q
2	3	Mike Agostini	Canada	21.5	Q
3	3	Clifton Bertrand	Trinidad and Tobago	21.7	
4	3	Samuel Chemweno	Kenya	22.3	
5	3	Muhammad Sharif Butt	Pakistan	22.6	
6	3	Peter Street	Northern Ireland	22.8	
1	4	Peter Radford	England	21.5	Q
2	4	Maurice Rae	New Zealand	21.7	Q
3	4	Erasmus Amukun	Uganda	22.1	
4	4	Terrance Gale	Australia	22.1	
5	4	G. Esan	Nigeria	22.4	
6	4	Bob Cockburn	Scotland	22.5	
1	5	Stan Levenson	Canada	21.5	Q
2	5	John Scott-Oldfield	England	21.5	Q
3	5	John Jones	Wales	22.1	
4	5	Seraphino Antao	Kenya	22.2	
5	5	John Quartey	Ghana	22.4	
	5	Henry Kennedy-Skipton	Hong Kong	DNS	
1	6	Gordon Day	South Africa	21.3	Q
2	6	Tom Robinson	Bahamas	21.3	Q
3	6	Graham Fleck	Scotland	22.2	
4	6	Gerald James	Jamaica	22.4	
5	6	Doug Clement	Canada	22.5	
6	6	Paddy Toner	Northern Ireland	22.5	

=== Semifinals ===
Qualification: First 3 in each heat (Q) qualify directly for the final.

Rank	Heat	Name	Nationality	Time	Notes
1	1	Gordon Day	South Africa	21.2	Q
2	1	Stan Levenson	Canada	21.2	Q
3	1	Keith Gardner	Jamaica	21.3	Q
4	1	David Segal	England	21.3	
5	1	Peter Radford	England	21.5	
6	1	Mike Agostini	Canada	21.5	
1	2	Tom Robinson	Bahamas	20.9	Q, GR
2	2	Edward Jeffreys	South Africa	20.9	Q
3	2	John Scott-Oldfield	England	21.5	Q
4	2	Robbie Brightwell	England	21.5	
5	2	Stuart Cameron	Canada	21.8	
6	2	Maurice Rae	New Zealand	21.9	

=== Final ===
Rank	Lane	Name	Nationality	Time	Notes
1st place, gold medalist(s)	6	Tom Robinson	Bahamas	21.08	
2nd place, silver medalist(s)	1	Keith Gardner	Jamaica	21.11	
3rd place, bronze medalist(s)	5	Gordon Day	South Africa	21.15	
4	4	Stan Levenson	Canada	21.5	
5	2	John Scott-Oldfield	England	21.8	
	3	Edward Jeffreys	South Africa	DNF	
