= Athletics at the 1948 Summer Olympics – Men's pole vault =

Men's pole vault at the Games of the XIV Olympiad
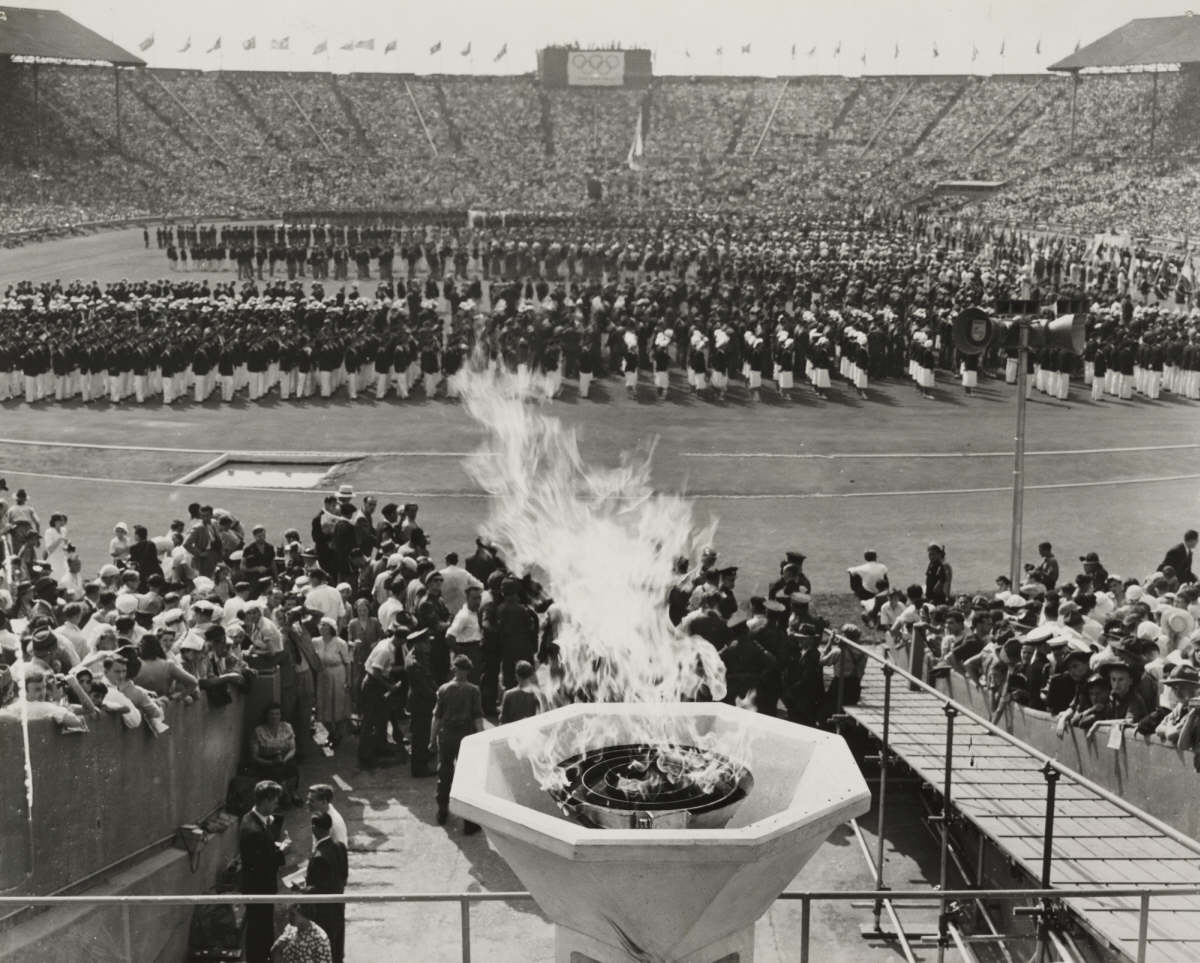
- Olympic stadium (opening ceremony)
- Venue: Wembley Stadium
- Dates: July 31, 1948 (qualifying); August 2, 1948 (final)
- Competitors: 19 from 10 nations
- Winning height: 4.30

Medalists
1st place, gold medalist(s)		Guinn Smith; United States
2nd place, silver medalist(s)		Erkki Kataja; Finland
3rd place, bronze medalist(s)		Bob Richards; United States

Video on YouTube Official Video Pole Vault competition starts @ 26:10

The men's pole vault event was part of the track and field athletics programme at the 1948 Summer Olympics. Nineteen athletes from 10 nations competed. The maximum number of athletes per nation had been set at 3 since the 1930 Olympic Congress. The competition was held on July 31 and August 2. During the final, a rainstorm came in during the jumps at 4.10. All the jumpers at 4.20 and higher had to deal with wet conditions on the runway and with their poles. The final was won by American Guinn Smith. Erkki Kataja had held the lead with a perfect set of jumps until Smith's last attempt clearance of 4.30. Smith's win was the United States' 11th consecutive victory in the men's pole vault. Kataja's silver was Finland's first medal in the event.

== Background ==
This was the 11th appearance of the event, which is one of 12 athletics events to have been held at every Summer Olympics. The only returning vaulter from the pre-war 1936 Games was sixth-place finisher Richard Webster of Great Britain. American Cornelius Warmerdam had dominated the pole vault during World War II, breaking the world record three times and increasing the record a total of 23 centimetres; however, he had retired in 1944. Boo Morcom was the favorite in London, having won the 1945, 1947, and 1948 AAU championships (the last tied with Bob Richards) and tied the Olympic trials with Guinn Smith. However, Morcom was injured at the Games.

Iceland and Puerto Rico each made their first appearance in the event. The United States made its 11th appearance, the only nation to have competed at every Olympic men's pole vault to that point.

== Competition format ==
The competition used the two-round format introduced in 1912, with results cleared between rounds. Vaulters received three attempts at each height. For the first time (other than the impromptu decision in 1936 after two Japanese vaulters refused to jump-off against each other), ties were broken by fewest misses.

In the qualifying round, the bar was set at heights including 3.60 metres, 3.70 metres, 3.80 metres, 3.90 metres, and 4.00 metres. All vaulters clearing 4.00 metres advanced to the final.

In the final, the bar was set at heights of 3.60 metres, 3.80 metres, 3.95 metres, 4.10 metres, 4.20 metres, 4.30 metres, and 4.40 metres.

== Records ==
Prior to the competition, the existing world and Olympic records were as follows.

World record	Cornelius Warmerdam (USA)	4.77	Modesto, United States	23 May 1942
Olympic record	Earle Meadows (USA)	4.35	Berlin, Germany	5 August 1936

No new world or Olympic records were set during the competition.

== Schedule ==
All times are British Summer Time (UTC+1)

Date	Time	Round
Saturday, 31 July 1948	11:00	Qualifying
Monday, 2 August 1948	14:30	Final

== Results ==
Key

- o = Height cleared
- x = Height failed
- – = Height passed
- r = Retired
- SB = Season's best
- PB = Personal best
- NR = National record
- AR = Area record
- OR = Olympic record
- WR = World record
- WL = World lead
- NM = No mark
- DNS = Did not start
- DQ = Disqualified

=== Qualifying round ===
Qual. rule: qualification standard 4.00m (Q) or at least best 12 qualified (q).

Rank	Athlete	Nation	Height	Notes
1	Guinn Smith	United States	4.00	Q
1	Erkki Kataja	Finland	4.00	Q
1	Bob Richards	United States	4.00	Q
1	Erling Kaas	Norway	4.00	Q
1	Ragnar Lundberg	Sweden	4.00	Q
1	Boo Morcom	United States	4.00	Q
1	Hugo Göllors	Sweden	4.00	Q
1	Valto Olenius	Finland	4.00	Q
1	Joe Barbosa	Puerto Rico	4.00	Q
1	José Vicente	Puerto Rico	4.00	Q
1	Victor Sillon	France	4.00	Q
1	Allan Lindberg	Sweden	4.00	Q
13	Georges Breitman	France	3.90	
14	Theodosios Balafas	Greece	3.80	
14	Torfi Bryngeirsson	Iceland	3.80	
16	Luis Ganoza	Peru	3.70	
17	Charles Bouvet	France	3.60	
17	Richard Webster	Great Britain	3.60	
17	Jaime Piqueras	Peru	3.60	
	Muhittin Akin	Turkey	DNS	
	Armin Scheurer	Switzerland	DNS	

=== Final ===
All vaulters cleared or passed at 3.60 metres and 3.80 metres; jump sequences for those heights are not available.

Rank	Athlete	Nation	3.95	4.10	4.20	4.30	4.40	Height
1st place, gold medalist(s)	Guinn Smith	United States	xo	xo	o	xxo	x--	4.30
2nd place, silver medalist(s)	Erkki Kataja	Finland	o	o	o	xxx	—N/a	4.20
3rd place, bronze medalist(s)	Bob Richards	United States	o	xo	xo	xxx	—N/a	4.20
4	Erling Kaas	Norway	o	o	xxx	—N/a		4.10
5	Ragnar Lundberg	Sweden	o	xxo	xxx	—N/a		4.10
6	Boo Morcom	United States	o	—	xxx	—N/a		3.95
7	Hugo Göllors	Sweden	xo	xxx	—N/a			3.95
7	Valto Olenius	Finland	xo	xxx	—N/a			3.95
9	José Barbosa	Puerto Rico	xxo	xxx	—N/a			3.95
9	José Vicente	Puerto Rico	xxo	xxx	—N/a			3.95
9	Victor Sillon	France	xxo	xxx	—N/a			3.95
12	Allan Lindberg	Sweden	xxx	—N/a				3.80
