= 1954 European Athletics Championships – Men's pole vault =

Men's pole vault at the European Athletics Championships

The men's pole vault at the 1954 European Athletics Championships was held in Bern, Switzerland, at Stadion Neufeld on 26 and 28 August 1954.

== Medalists ==
| Gold | Eeles Landström; Finland |
| Silver | Ragnar Lundberg; Sweden |
| Bronze | Geoffrey Elliott; Great Britain |
| Bronze | Jukka Piironen; Finland |

== Results ==
=== Final ===
28 August

| Rank | Name | Nationality | Result | Notes |
|---|---|---|---|---|
| 1st place, gold medalist(s) | Eeles Landström | Finland | 4.40 | CR NR |
| 2nd place, silver medalist(s) | Ragnar Lundberg | Sweden | 4.40 | CR |
| 3rd place, bronze medalist(s) | Geoffrey Elliott | Great Britain | 4.30 | NR |
| 3rd place, bronze medalist(s) | Jukka Piironen | Finland | 4.30 | |
| 5 | Tamás Homonnay | Hungary | 4.30 | |
| 6 | Georgios Roubanis | Greece | 4.25 | |
| 7 | Victor Sillon | France | 4.25 | |
| 8 | Vitaliy Chernobay | Soviet Union | 4.25 | |
| 9 | Edward Adamczyk | Poland | 4.25 | |
| 10 | Lennart Lindberg | Finland | 4.20 | |
| 11 | Zenon Ważny | Poland | 4.15 | |
| 12 | Edmondo Ballotta | Italy | 4.10 | |
| 13 | Viktor Knyazev | Soviet Union | 4.10 | |
| 13 | Jiří Krejcar | Czechoslovakia | 4.10 | |
| 15 | Richard Larsen | Denmark | 4.10 | |
| 16 | Julius Schneider | West Germany | 4.10 | |
| 17 | Dimitar Khlebarov | Bulgaria | 4.10 | NR |
| 18 | Walter Hofstetter | Switzerland | 4.10 | |
| 19 | Milan Milakov | Yugoslavia | 4.00 | |
| | Torfi Bryngeirsson | Iceland | DNS | |

=== Qualification ===
26 August

| Rank | Name | Nationality | Result | Notes |
|---|---|---|---|---|
| | Tamás Homonnay | Hungary | 4.05 | Q |
| | Zenon Ważny | Poland | 4.05 | Q |
| | Julius Schneider | West Germany | 4.05 | Q |
| | Edward Adamczyk | Poland | 4.05 | Q |
| | Victor Sillon | France | 4.05 | Q |
| | Richard Larsen | Denmark | 4.05 | Q |
| | Ragnar Lundberg | Sweden | 4.05 | Q |
| | Walter Hofstetter | Switzerland | 4.05 | Q |
| | Jiří Krejcar | Czechoslovakia | 4.05 | Q |
| | Milan Milakov | Yugoslavia | 4.05 | Q |
| | Edmondo Ballotta | Italy | 4.05 | Q |
| | Eeles Landström | Finland | 4.05 | Q |
| | Geoffrey Elliott | Great Britain | 4.05 | Q |
| | Lennart Lindberg | Finland | 4.05 | Q |
| | Vitaliy Chernobay | Soviet Union | 4.05 | Q |
| | Jukka Piironen | Finland | 4.05 | Q |
| | Dimitar Khlebarov | Bulgaria | 4.05 | Q |
| | Viktor Knyazev | Soviet Union | 4.05 | Q |
| | Georgios Roubanis | Greece | 4.05 | Q |
| | Torfi Bryngeirsson | Iceland | 4.05 | Q |
| | Zeno Dragomir | Romania | 3.95 | |
| | Giulio Chiesa | Italy | 3.80 | |
| | Jacques Pirlot | Belgium | 3.80 | |
| | Fredy Bossert | Switzerland | 3.80 | |

== Participation ==
According to an unofficial count, 24 athletes from 18 countries participated in the event.

- Belgium (1)
- Bulgaria (1)
- Czechoslovakia (1)
- Denmark (1)
- Finland (3)
- France (1)
- Greece (1)
- Hungary (1)
- Iceland (1)
- Italy (2)
- Poland (2)
- Romania (1)
- Soviet Union (2)
- Sweden (1)
- Switzerland (2)
- Great Britain (1)
- West Germany (1)
- Yugoslavia (1)
