= Graham Fleck =

Scottish athlete

Personal information
- Nationality: British (Scottish)
- Born: c.1939

Sport
- Sport: Athletics
- Event: Sprints
- Club: Bellahouston Harriers

Graham R. Fleck (born c.1939 is a former track and field athlete from Scotland who competed at the 1958 British Empire and Commonwealth Games (now Commonwealth Games).

== Biography ==
Fleck was a member of the Bellahouston Harriers and won the 100 and 220 yards junior titles at the 1957 Renfrew Championships.

In February 1958 he was named by the Scottish AAA in the 'possibles list' for the forthcoming Commonwealth and Empire Games and in June of the same year, lost to James Edgar, but beat Allan Dunbar in the Lanarkshire Police Sports Championships.

At the 1958 Scottish A.A.A. Championships, he finished third behind Gavin Carragher and Bob Cockburn.

He represented the Scottish Empire and Commonwealth Games team at the 1958 British Empire Games in Cardiff, Wales, participating in one event, the 220 yards race.
