= 1950 European Athletics Championships – Men's pole vault =

Men's pole vault at the European Athletics Championships

The men's pole vault at the 1950 European Athletics Championships was held in Brussels, Belgium, at Heysel Stadium on 24 and 26 August 1950.

== Medalists ==
Gold	Ragnar Lundberg; Sweden
Silver	Valto Olenius; Finland
Bronze	Jukka Piironen; Finland

== Results ==
=== Final ===
26 August

Rank	Name	Nationality	Result	Notes
1st place, gold medalist(s)	Ragnar Lundberg	Sweden	4.30	CR
2nd place, silver medalist(s)	Valto Olenius	Finland	4.25	
3rd place, bronze medalist(s)	Jukka Piironen	Finland	4.25	
4	Victor Sillon	France	4.10	
5	Erling Kaas	Norway	4.10	
6	Armin Scheurer	Switzerland	4.00	
7	Birger Hultqvist	Sweden	4.00	
8	Rudy Stjernild	Denmark	3.80	
9	Georges Breitman	France	3.80	
	Torfi Bryngeirsson	Iceland	DNS	

=== Qualification ===
24 August

Rank	Name	Nationality	Result	Notes
	Valto Olenius	Finland	4.00	Q
	Erling Kaas	Norway	4.00	Q
	Jukka Piironen	Finland	4.00	Q
	Rudy Stjernild	Denmark	4.00	Q
	Birger Hultqvist	Sweden	4.00	Q
	Ragnar Lundberg	Sweden	4.00	Q
	Torfi Bryngeirsson	Iceland	4.00	Q
	Armin Scheurer	Switzerland	4.00	Q
	Victor Sillon	France	4.00	Q
	Georges Breitman	France	4.00	Q
	Muhittin Akın	Turkey	3.90	
	Milan Milakov	Yugoslavia	3.90	
	Rigas Efstatiadis	Greece	3.80	
	Ferdinand Degens	Belgium	3.60	
	Albert Van Herck	Belgium	NH	

== Participation ==
According to an unofficial count, 15 athletes from 11 countries participated in the event.

- Belgium (2)
- Denmark (1)
- Finland (2)
- France (2)
- Greece (1)
- Iceland (1)
- Norway (1)
- Sweden (2)
- Switzerland (1)
- Turkey (1)
- Yugoslavia (1)
