= Athletics at the 1958 British Empire and Commonwealth Games – Men's long jump =

Men's long jump at the Commonwealth Games

The men's long jump event at the 1958 British Empire and Commonwealth Games was held on 22 July at the Cardiff Arms Park in Cardiff, Wales.

== Medalists ==
Gold	Silver	Bronze
Paul Foreman; Jamaica	Deryck Taylor; Jamaica	Muhammad Ramzan Ali; Pakistan

== Results ==
=== Qualification ===
Qualifying distance: 23 ft (7.01 m)

Rank	Name	Nationality	Result	Notes
?	Ian Tomlinson	Australia	23 ft 7 3/4 in (7.21 m)	Q
17	Gabuh Piging	North Borneo	22 ft 11 1/2 in (7.00 m)	
18	Jim McCann	Australia	22 ft 9 1/4 in (6.94 m)	
19	Maurice Rich	Australia	22 ft 9 in (6.93 m)	
20	Gordon Hamilton	Northern Ireland	22 ft 7 1/2 in (6.90 m)	
21	Tom Cairns	Northern Ireland	22 ft 0 1/2 in (6.72 m)	
22	Francis Tommy	Sierra Leone	21 ft 11 3/4 in (6.70 m)	
23	Ray Gazard	Wales	21 ft 8 1/2 in (6.62 m)	
24	Dennis Cakebread	England	21 ft 6 in (6.55 m)	
25	Hector Hogan	Australia	21 ft 5 in (6.53 m)	
26	Learie Scipio	Trinidad and Tobago	21 ft 3 in (6.48 m)	
27	J. Agbo	Ghana	21 ft 2 in (6.45 m)	
28	Joseph Lee Gut-Hing	Sarawak	21 ft 0 3/4 in (6.42 m)	
29	Pattiyage Victor	Ceylon	20 ft 7 in (6.27 m)	
30	Godrey Roberts	Saint Vincent and the Grenadines	19 ft 5 1/2 in (5.93 m)	
	Alex Grant	Scotland	NM	
	Mohinder Singh	India	DNS	
	T. E. Patel	Mauritius	DNS	
	Lloyd Anderson	Saint Vincent and the Grenadines	DNS	
	Joe Goddard	Trinidad and Tobago	DNS	

=== Final ===
Rank	Name	Nationality	Result	Notes
1st place, gold medalist(s)	Paul Foreman	Jamaica	24 ft 6 1/4 in (7.47 m)	
2nd place, silver medalist(s)	Deryck Taylor	Jamaica	24 ft 6 1/4 in (7.47 m)	
3rd place, bronze medalist(s)	Muhammad Ramzan Ali	Pakistan	24 ft 0 1/2 in (7.33 m)	
4	Ian Tomlinson	Australia	23 ft 11 1/2 in (7.30 m)	
5	Roy Cruttenden	England	23 ft 10 1/2 in (7.28 m)	
6	Roy Williams	New Zealand	23 ft 10 in (7.26 m)	
7	Jack Smyth	Canada	23 ft 5 3/4 in (7.16 m)	
8	Dave Norris	New Zealand	23 ft 5 1/2 in (7.15 m)	
9	Keith Parker	England	23 ft 3 1/4 in (7.09 m)	
10	Victor Odofin	Nigeria	23 ft 2 3/4 in (7.08 m)	
11	Ken Wilmshurst	England	23 ft 2 1/2 in (7.07 m)	
12	Ram Mehar	India	23 ft 1 in (7.04 m)	
13	Lawrence Ogwang	Uganda	22 ft 10 3/4 in (6.98 m)	
14	Karim Olowu	Nigeria	22 ft 10 1/2 in (6.97 m)	
15	Desmond Luke	Sierra Leone	22 ft 10 1/4 in (6.97 m)	
16	Brian Woolley	Wales	21 ft 3 in (6.48 m)	
