= 1946 European Athletics Championships – Men's pole vault =

Men's pole vault at the European Athletics Championships

The men's pole vault at the 1946 European Athletics Championships was held in Oslo, Norway, at Bislett Stadium on 25 August 1946.

== Medalists ==
Gold	Allan Lindberg; Sweden
Silver	Nikolay Ozolin; Soviet Union
Bronze	Jan Bem; Czechoslovakia

== Results ==
=== Final ===
25 August

Rank	Name	Nationality	Result	Notes
1st place, gold medalist(s)	Allan Lindberg	Sweden	4.17	CR, NR
2nd place, silver medalist(s)	Nikolay Ozolin	Soviet Union	4.10	
3rd place, bronze medalist(s)	Jan Bém	Czechoslovakia	4.10	
4	Erling Kaas	Norway	4.10	
5	Hugo Olsson	Sweden	4.00	
6	Georges Breitman	France	3.90	
7	Miroslav Krejcar	Czechoslovakia	3.90	
8	Helmer Petersen	Denmark	3.90	
9	Cor Lamorée	Netherlands	3.90	
10	Zoltán Zsitvai	Hungary	3.80	

== Participation ==
According to an unofficial count, 10 athletes from 8 countries participated in the event.

- Czechoslovakia (2)
- Denmark (1)
- France (1)
- Hungary (1)
- Netherlands (1)
- Norway (1)
- Soviet Union (1)
- Sweden (2)
