= James Edgar (sprinter) =

Scottish athlete

Personal information
- Nationality: British (Scottish)
- Born: c.1930

Sport
- Sport: Athletics
- Event: Sprints
- Club: Glasgow Police AC

James G. Edgar (c.1930) was a track and field athlete from Scotland who competed at the 1958 British Empire and Commonwealth Games (now Commonwealth Games).

== Biography ==
Edgar was a constable in the Glasgow City Constabulary and was a member of their athletics club and a British international.

He was the 1957 British Police sprint champion and in February 1958 he was named by the Scottish AAA in the 'possibles list' for the forthcoming Commonwealth and Empire Games. Edgar beat Graham Fleck and Allan Dunbar in the June 1958 Lanarkshire Police Sports Championships, before retaining his 100 yards title at the 1958 National Police Championships. At the 1958 Scottish A.A.A. Championships, he finished runner-up behind Gavin Carragher in the 100 yards.

He represented the Scottish Empire and Commonwealth Games team at the 1958 British Empire Games in Cardiff, Wales, participating in one event, the 100 yards race.
