= Athletics at the 1955 Summer International University Sports Week – Men's pole vault =

The men's pole vault event at the 1955 International University Sports Week was held in San Sebastián on 13 August 1955.

== Results ==
Rank	Name	Nationality	Result	Notes
1st place, gold medalist(s)	Edmondo Ballotta	Italy	3.80	
2nd place, silver medalist(s)	Wolfgang Goldenbohm	West Germany	3.70	
3rd place, bronze medalist(s)	Kenneth North	New Zealand	3.70	
4	Rossgamm	West Germany	3.60	
