= Robert Cockburn =

Robert Cockburn may refer to:

- Robert Cockburn (diplomat) (died 1526), Scottish diplomat and bishop
- Sir Robert Cockburn (physicist) (1909–1994), British government scientist
- Sir Robert Cockburn, 9th Baronet (1903–1938), see Cockburn baronets#Cockburn baronets of Cockburn
- Robert Cockburn (1781–1844), soldier, wine merchant and founder of Cockburn's Port House
- Bob Cockburn, Scottish sprinter
