= Ronnie Chambers =

Northern Irish athlete (born c.1934)

Personal information
- Nationality: British (Northern Irish)
- Born: c.1934

Sport
- Sport: Athletics
- Event: Sprints
- Club: Albert Foundry AC; Short and Harland AC

Ronald J. Chambers (born c.1934) is a former athlete from Northern Ireland, who represented Northern Ireland at the British Empire and Commonwealth Games (now Commonwealth Games).

== Biography ==
Chambers attended The Royal School, Armagh and had trials for the Irish national rugby team and his father James Chambers was an Irish international footballer. In 1954, Chambers was a member of the Albert Foundry Athletics Club when he won the Irish national title over both 100 and 220 yards. From Bessbrook, he later joined Short and Harland Athletics Club in Belfast.

At the 1956 Northern Ireland Championships he won the 220 yards, defeating Paddy Toner, but finished second to Toner in the 100 yards. In May 1958 he was selected for the first trials relay team at Paisley Park, with the view to forming the relay squad for the Empire Games.

Chambers was named by the Northern Ireland AAA in the final 1958 Northern Irish Team for the forthcoming Empire and Commonwealth Games. He subsequently competed at the 1958 British Empire and Commonwealth Games in Cardiff, Wales, participating in the three athletics events; the 100 yards, the 220 yards and the 4×110 yards relay event with Gordon Hamilton, Peter Street and Paddy Toner.
