= 1958 AAA Championships =

Outdoor track and field competition

- Dates: 11–12 July 1958
- Host city: London, England
- Venue: White City Stadium
- Level: Senior
- Type: Outdoor

The 1958 AAA Championships was the 1958 edition of the annual outdoor track and field competition organised by the Amateur Athletic Association (AAA). It was held from 11 to 12 July 1958 at White City Stadium in London, England.

== Summary ==
The Championships covered two days of competition. The marathon was held from Windsor to Chiswick and the decathlon event was held in Loughborough.

== Results ==
Event	Gold		Silver		Bronze	
100 yards	Jimmy Omagbemi	9.9	(New Zealand) Maurice Rae	9.9	Mike Agostini	9.9
220 yards	David Segal	21.4	Robbie Brightwell	21.7	John Scott-Oldfield	21.8
440 yards	John Salisbury	47.2 NR	(South Africa) Mal Spence	47.8	Peter Higgins	48.0
880 yards	Brian Hewson	1:48.3	Mike Rawson	1:48.6	(Australia) Herb Elliott	1:49.0
1 mile	(Scotland) Graham Everett	4:06.4	(New Zealand) Murray Halberg	4:07.5	(Scotland) Mike Berisford	4:08.0
3 miles	Stan Eldon	13:22.4	Nyandika Maiyoro	13:34.8	Peter Clark	13:39.2
6 miles	Stan Eldon	28:05.0 NR	Hugh Foord	28:16.4	Martin Hyman	28:18.8
10 miles	Frederick Norris	49:39.0 NR	Hugh Foord	50:23.4	Gerry North	50:50.0
marathon	Colin Kemball	2:22:27.4	(Austria) Adolf Gruber	2:23:30.0	Arthur Keily	2:23:32
steeplechase	Eric Shirley	8:51.0	(Wales) John Disley	8:51.2	(Scotland) David Shaw	9:02.4
120y hurdles	Keith Gardner	14.1	Peter Hildreth	14.5	Thomas Obi	14.7
220y hurdles	Ken Wilmshurst	24.3	Peter Brunyee	24.4	(Malaysia) Tan Eng Yoon	24.7
440y hurdles	(Australia) David Lean	51.2	Tom Farrell	52.7	John Metcalf	52.8
2 miles walk	Stan Vickers	13:33.4	Ken Matthews	13:45.2	Bob Goodall	14:09.2
7 miles walk	Stan Vickers	51:10.2	Eric Hall	52:14.3	Bob Goodall	53:28.0
high jump	Patrick Etolu	2.032	Ernle Haisley	2.007	Joseph Leresae	2.007
pole vault	(New Zealand) Merv Richards	4.11	(Pakistan) Allah Ditta	4.11	Geoff Elliott	4.11
long jump	Karim Olowu	7.28	Roy Cruttenden	7.22	Ronald Coleman	7.20
triple jump	(New Zealand) Dave Norris	15.64	(Australia) Ian Tomlinson	15.09	(Australia) Maurice Rich	15.05
shot put	Arthur Rowe	17.30 NR	Martyn Lucking	16.38	(New Zealand) Les Mills	16.28
discus throw	(South Africa) Fanie du Plessis	52.22	(New Zealand) Les Mills	51.00	Gerry Carr	50.14
hammer throw	Mike Ellis	61.92	(Pakistan) Muhammad Iqbal	60.38	(Republic of Ireland) John Lawlor	59.06
javelin throw	Colin Smith	66.48	Peter Cullen	65.86	(Pakistan) Jalal Khan	65.20
decathlon	Colin Andrews	5113	(Rhodesia) Gerald Brown	4871	Lloyd Maloney	4865

== See also ==
- 1958 WAAA Championships
