= Peter Street =

Peter Street may refer to:

- Peter Street (carpenter) (died 1609), English carpenter and builder in London
- Peter Street (footballer) (born 1980), former professional Australian rules footballer
- Peter Street (sprinter) (born c. 1938), former athlete from Northern Ireland
- Peter Street, Manchester, a thoroughfare in Manchester, England
