= Athletics at the 1958 British Empire and Commonwealth Games – Men's triple jump =

Men's triple jump at the Commonwealth Games

The men's triple jump event at the 1958 British Empire and Commonwealth Games was held on 24 July at the Cardiff Arms Park in Cardiff, Wales.

== Medalists ==
Gold	Silver	Bronze
Ian Tomlinson; Australia	Jack Smyth; Canada	Dave Norris; New Zealand

== Results ==
=== Qualification ===
Qualifying distance: 48 ft (14.63 m) (?)

Rank	Name	Nationality	Result	Notes
?	Ian Tomlinson	Australia	48 ft 7 3/4 in (14.83 m)	Q
?	Maurice Rich	Australia	48 ft 6 in (14.78 m)	Q
11	Mohinder Singh	India	47 ft 6 1/2 in (14.49 m)	
12	Roy Williams	New Zealand	47 ft 5 3/4 in (14.47 m)	
13	Frederick Wyers	England	47 ft 4 1/4 in (14.43 m)	
14	Denis Field	England	47 ft 2 1/4 in (14.38 m)	
15	Michael Ralph	England	46 ft 8 1/2 in (14.24 m)	
16	Tom Cairns	Northern Ireland	46 ft 4 1/2 in (14.14 m)	
17	Joseph Tokana	Fiji	46 ft 2 in (14.07 m)	
18	Hugh Murray	Scotland	45 ft 4 1/4 in (13.82 m)	
19	Richard Dodd	Wales	45 ft 0 3/4 in (13.74 m)	
20	Learie Scipio	Trinidad and Tobago	44 ft 2 3/4 in (13.48 m)	
	Godrey Roberts	Saint Vincent and the Grenadines	NM	
	Beresford Primrose	Australia	DNS	
	Deryck Taylor	Jamaica	DNS	
	Paul Foreman	Jamaica	DNS	

=== Final ===
Rank	Name	Nationality	Result	Notes
1st place, gold medalist(s)	Ian Tomlinson	Australia	51 ft 7 3/4 in (15.74 m)	
2nd place, silver medalist(s)	Jack Smyth	Canada	51 ft 5 3/4 in (15.69 m)	
3rd place, bronze medalist(s)	Dave Norris	New Zealand	50 ft 8 1/4 in (15.45 m)	
4	Maurice Rich	Australia	50 ft 8 1/4 in (15.45 m)	
5	Ken Wilmshurst	England	50 ft 6 1/2 in (15.41 m)	
6	Gabuh Piging	North Borneo	49 ft 6 3/4 in (15.11 m)	
7	Lawrence Ogwang	Uganda	49 ft 6 3/4 in (15.11 m)	
8	Tan Eng Yoon	Singapore	48 ft 9 1/4 in (14.87 m)	
9	Paul Engo	Nigeria	48 ft 0 in (14.63 m)	
10	Sunday Akapata	Nigeria	46 ft 11 in (14.30 m)	
