= Akraka =

- Gender: Male
- Language(s): Igbo

Origin
- Word/name: Nigeria
- Meaning: Destiny

Akraka is a surname. Notable people with the surname include:

- Maria Akraka (born 1966), Swedish entrepreneur, television host, and middle-distance runner
- Smart Akraka (1934–2016), Nigerian sprinter, father of Maria
