= Paddy Toner =

Northern Irish athlete (born c.1937)

Personal information
- Nationality: British (Northern Irish)
- Born: c.1937

Sport
- Sport: Athletics
- Event: Sprints
- Club: Albert Foundry AC

Patrick Toner (born c.1937) is a former athlete from Northern Ireland, who represented Northern Ireland at the British Empire and Commonwealth Games (now Commonwealth Games).

== Biography ==
Toner was a member of the Albert Foundry Athletics Club in Belfast.

At the 1956 Northern Ireland Championships he retained his 100 yards title, defeating Ronnie Chambers into second place. He finished second behind R. Whitelock in the 100 yards event during the international match against Scotland in September 1957.

In May 1958 he was selected for the first trials relay team at Paisley Park, with the view to forming the relay squad for the Empire Games and won both the 100 yards and 220 yards titles at the 1958 Summer Athletic League trophy meeting and at the same meeting finished runner-up behind Billy Dundas in the 440 yards. He set a new 100 yards Northern Irish record by running 9.9secs in the heats at the 100 yards championship of Northern Ireland in June 1958.

Toner was named by the Northern Ireland AAA in the final 1958 Northern Irish Team for the forthcoming Empire and Commonwealth Games. He subsequently competed at the 1958 British Empire and Commonwealth Games in Cardiff, Wales, participating in the three athletics events; the 100 yards, the 220 yards and the 4×110 yards relay event with Ronnie Chambers, Gordon Hamilton and Peter Street.
