= Nikolay Ozolin =

Soviet and Russian pole vaulter

Personal information
- Born: Nikolay Georgiyevich Ozolin; 2 November 1906 Karlshof, Pomerania, Prussia, German Empire (present-day Komarowo, Poland)
- Died: 25 June 2000 (aged 93) Moscow, Russia

Sport
- Sport: Athletics
- Event: Pole vault
- Club: Dynamo Moscow

Achievements and titles
- Personal best: 4.30 m (1939)
Medal record
Men's athletics
Representing Soviet Union
European Championships
Silver medal – second place	1946 Oslo	Pole vault

Nikolay Georgiyevich Ozolin (Russian: Николай Георгиевич Озолин; 2 November 1906 – 25 June 2000) was a Soviet and Russian pole vaulter who won a silver medal at the 1946 European Championships. He retired in 1950 and later had a long career as an athletics coach. Between 1954 and 1962 he headed the Russian research institute of sport and physical education. In 1970 he defended a habilitation in pedagogy and later supervised 7 habilitation and more than 50 PhD theses in sport-related topics. His trainees included Leonid Shcherbakov.
