= Eeles Landström =

Finnish pole vaulter (1932–2022)

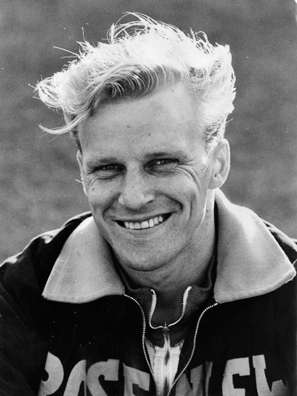
- Landström in the 1950s

Personal information
- Full name: Eeles Enok Landström
- Born: 3 January 1932 Viiala, Finland
- Died: 29 June 2022 (aged 90)
- Height: 185 cm (6 ft 1 in)
- Weight: 80–82 kg (176–181 lb)

Sport
- Sport: Athletics
- Events: Pole vault, decathlon
- Club: Rosenlewin Urheilijat-38; Michigan Wolverines

Achievements and titles
- Personal bests: PV – 4.57 m (1958); Decathlon – 6123 (1952)
Medal record
Men's athletics
Representing Finland
Olympic Games
Bronze medal – third place	1960 Rome	Pole vault
European Championships
Gold medal – first place	1954 Bern	Pole vault
Gold medal – first place	1958 Stockholm	Pole vault

Eeles Enok Landström (3 January 1932 – 29 June 2022) was a Finnish pole vaulter, a politician and businessman. He won two European titles (1954 and 1958) and won the bronze medal at the 1960 Rome Olympic Games. Landström was the Olympic flag bearer for Finland in 1956 and 1960. and served as a member of the Finnish Parliament.

== Biography ==
Landström was born in Viiala on 3 January 1932. Landström studied in the United States at the University of Michigan and graduated as Bachelor of Science in 1959. He was a two-time Big Ten champion in pole vaulting while at Michigan, in 1956 and 1959. In 1961 he became the first Finnish participant at the Olympic Academy arranged by the International Olympic Committee in Athens.

Landström was a member of the Finnish parliament from 1966 to 1971 and worked also in executive positions, for example as assistant director of Finance in the Finnish Broadcasting Company in 1976–1981 and as a member of the Administrative Council of the Finnish Broadcasting Company in 1967 to 1976. He was granted the Finnish honorary title of sosiaalineuvos in 2008.

Landström participated in the International Inter-Parliamentary Union (IPU) as a board member of Finland's group and as a representative of Finland in the European Broadcasting Union, nominated by the Finnish Broadcasting Company. Landström has written two youth novels (1966, 1974) and a biography (2002). His first novel was awarded as the best Finnish youth novel in 1966.

Landström died on 29 June 2022 at the age of 90.

== Athletic Career ==
He made his athletic debut at his home Olympics, 1952 Helsinki Olympics Games, competing in the decathlon. Although he finished 14th overall he won the pole vault discipline.

Landström participated in 30 international pole vault competitions, winning 25 of them in a row. His best achievements were European gold medals in 1954 and 1958, the only medals Finland won in these competitions. He also won eight consecutive Finnish titles in 1953–1960 and improved the Finnish record 13 times in 1954–1958. He improved the European record three times in 1955–1956 and set an Australian record in 1956. In 1961, he won the Nordic Championship. In 2008 Landström received the Finnish Pro Urheilu award for his athletic achievements.

== Cultural Legacy ==
A television documentary was made on Landström and his life in 1997, directed by Ville-Veikko Salminen. He was also the center figure in a play, which was written and directed by Jorma Kairimo. The premiere of the play ”Eeles – kohti päämäärää” (Eeles – towards the goal) took place in Akaa, Finland, in September 2008.
