= John Oliver (sprinter) =

Welsh athlete

Personal information
- Nationality: British (Welsh)
- Born: c.1940 Carmarthenshire, Wales

Sport
- Sport: Athletics
- Event: Sprints
- Club: Llanelly G.S.

John Wynne Oliver (born c.1940) is a former track and field athlete from Wales, who competed at the 1958 British Empire and Commonwealth Games (now Commonwealth Games).

== Biography ==
Oliver, educated at Llanelly Grammar School, was a member of the Llanelly Athletics Club and in June 1958 he represented South Wales against North Wales in a warm up event before the Empire Games, finishing runner-up behind Ron Jones in both the 100 yards and 220 yards events. He also finished third in both events at the 1958 AAA Welsh championships.

He represented the 1958 Welsh team at the 1958 British Empire and Commonwealth Games in Cardiff, Wales, where he participated in one event; the 220 yards race.

He recorded 9.9 seconds for the 100 yards for Wales at a triangular match in June 1959.
