= John Morgan (sprinter) =

British sprinter

Personal information
- Nationality: British (Welsh)

Sport
- Sport: Athletics
- Event: Sprints
- Club: Thames Valley Harriers

John Edward Price Morgan is a former Welsh track and field athlete who competed at the Commonwealth Games.

== Biography ==
Morgan was a member of the Thames Valley Harriers and during 1958 became the Middlesex champion and ran 9.9 secs.

As a late entry, he starred in the AAA versus Cambridge University meeting in May 1958, defeating Roy Sandstrom in the 100 yards. He was also selected for Wales in an international match against Nigeria in June 1958. He competed at the 1958 AAA Championships at the White City Stadium, finishing second in his heat.

He represented the Welsh team at the 1958 British Empire and Commonwealth Games in Cardiff, Wales, where he competed in the men's 100 yards event and helped Wales secure a fifth place finish in the final of the men's 4 × 110 yards relay with Ron Jones, Nick Whitehead and Dewi Roberts.
