= Tom Cairns (long jumper) =

Northern Irish athlete

Personal information
- Nationality: British (Northern Irish)
- Born: c.1939

Sport
- Sport: Athletics
- Events: Long jump, triple jump
- Club: Short and Harland AC; Albert Foundry AC

Thomas Cairns (born c. 1939) is a former athlete from Northern Ireland, who represented Northern Ireland at the British Empire and Commonwealth Games (now Commonwealth Games).

== Biography ==
Carins attended Belfast Royal Academy and was a member of the Short and Harland Athletic Club before he joined the Albert Foundry Athletics Club in Belfast.

He won the long jump title at the 1958 Summer Athletic League trophy meeting but was stronger in the triple jump, winning the championship of Northern Ireland in June 1958. Shortly afterwards he jumped 46ft 5ins, which nearly broke the 24-year-old record set by Eddie Boyce in 1934.

Cairns was named by the Northern Ireland AAA in the final 1958 Northern Irish Team for the forthcoming Empire and Commonwealth Games. He subsequently competed at the 1958 British Empire and Commonwealth Games in Cardiff, Wales, participating in the two athletics events; the triple jump and long jump.

Cairns attended Queen's University Belfast and was the 1959 Irish triple jump champion. Cairns also played for rugby and was captain of the British Thomson-Houston team.
