= Thomas Obi =

Nigerian sprinter

Personal information
- Nationality: Nigerian
- Born: 1932 (age 93–94)

Sport
- Sport: Athletics
- Event: Sprinting / hurdles
Medal record
Men's athletics
Representing Nigeria
British Empire and Commonwealth Games
Silver medal – second place	1958 Cardiff	4 × 110 yd relay

Thomas Obi (born 1932) is a Nigerian sprinter who ceompeted at the 1956 Summer Olympics.

== Biography ==
Obi competed in the men's 100 metres at the 1956 Olympic Games in Melbourne.

Obi finished second behind Keith Gardner in the 120 yards hurdles event at the British 1958 AAA Championships. Shortly afterwards he won a silver medal in the 1958 British Empire and Commonwealth Games 4×110 yards relay (with Jimmy Omagbemi, Smart Akraka, and Victor Odofin. At the 1958 British Empire and Commonwealth Games Obi was eliminated in the semi-finals of the 120 yards hurdles and in the quarter-finals of the 100 yards.
