= Peter Street (sprinter) =

Northern Irish athlete (born c.1938)

Personal information
- Nationality: British (Northern Irish)
- Born: c.1938

Sport
- Sport: Athletics
- Events: Sprints / middle-distance / long jump, triple jump
- Club: East Antrim Harriers AC

Peter Street (born c.1938) is a former athlete from Northern Ireland, who represented Northern Ireland at the British Empire and Commonwealth Games (now Commonwealth Games).

== Biography ==
Street was a member of the East Antrim Harriers Athletics Club in Belfast and finished third at the 1957 Northern Ireland AAA Championships.

In May 1958 after recording 9.9 seconds over 100 yards in Dublin, he was selected for the first trials relay team at Paisley Park, with the view to forming the relay squad for the Empire Games.

Street was named by the Northern Ireland AAA in the final 1958 Northern Irish Team for the forthcoming Empire and Commonwealth Games. He subsequently competed at the 1958 British Empire and Commonwealth Games in Cardiff, Wales, participating in the three athletics events; the 100 yards, the 220 yards and the 4×110 yards relay event with Ronnie Chambers, Gordon Hamilton and Paddy Toner.
