= Bill Henderson (sprinter) =

Scottish athlete

Personal information
- Nationality: British (Scottish)
- Born: c.1929

Sport
- Sport: Athletics
- Event: Sprints
- Club: Watsonians AC; Benwell Harriers

William Henderson (born c.1929) is a former track and field athlete from Scotland who competed at the 1958 British Empire and Commonwealth Games (now Commonwealth Games).

== Biography ==
Henderson was a member of the Watsonians Athletics Club and represented Great Britain against Germany in 1955.

In 1956, living in Newcastle and competing for Benwell Harriers at the time, he retained his Scottish 220 yards national title and in 1957 he won the 220 yards title at the S.A.A.A Championships for the fourth consecutive year. In February 1958 he was named by the Scottish AAA in the 'possibles list' for the forthcoming Commonwealth and Empire Games.

He represented the Scottish Empire and Commonwealth Games team at the 1958 British Empire Games in Cardiff, Wales, participating in one event, the 220 yards race.
