= Volodymyr Brazhnyk =

Ukrainian pole vaulter

Personal information
- Nationality: Ukrainian
- Born: 27 September 1924 Liubotyn, Ukrainian SSR
- Died: 29 January 1999 (aged 74) Moscow, Russian Federation

Sport
- Sport: Athletics
- Event: Pole vault

Volodymyr Brazhnyk (27 September 1924 – 29 January 1999) was a Ukrainian athlete. He competed in the men's pole vault at the 1952 Summer Olympics, representing the Soviet Union.
