= Charles Bouvet =

French pole vaulter

Personal information
- Nationality: French
- Born: 17 October 1918 Allinges, Haute-Savoie, France
- Died: 26 May 2005 (aged 86)

Sport
- Sport: Athletics
- Event: Pole vault

Charles Bouvet (17 October 1918 – 26 May 2005) was a French athlete. He competed in the men's pole vault at the 1948 Summer Olympics.
