= Dewi Roberts =

British sprinter

Personal information
- Nationality: British (Welsh)
- Born: 1939 (age 86–87) Pentraeth, Anglesey, Wales

Sport
- Sport: Athletics
- Event: Sprints
- Club: Liverpool University AC; Liverpool Harriers

Dewi W. Roberts (born 1939) is a former Welsh track and field athlete who competed at the Commonwealth Games.

== Biography ==
Roberts was educated at Beaumaris Grammar School and studied medicine at the University of Liverpool. He ran 9.9 secs during the 1957 season and held five North Wales Championships records.

Roberts was a member of the Liverpool Harriers during his years of study.

He represented the Welsh team at the 1958 British Empire and Commonwealth Games in Cardiff, Wales, where he competed in the men's 100 yards event and helped Wales secure a fifth place finish in the final of the men's 4 × 110 yards relay with Ron Jones, Nick Whitehead and John Morgan.
