= Ray Gazard =

Welsh athlete

Personal information
- Nationality: British (Welsh)
- Born: c.1938 Cardiff, Wales

Sport
- Sport: Athletics
- Event(s): Long Jump; Wing
- Club: Birchgrove Harriers / Bath Rugby

Raymond Gazard (born c.1938) is a former track and field athlete and Rugby union player from Wales, who competed at the 1958 British Empire and Commonwealth Games (now Commonwealth Games).

== Biography ==
Gazard was a member of the Birchgrove Harriers and played rugby for Bath.

At the age of 18 he won the 1956 Welsh National title and in 1958 finished runner-up behind Brian Woolley in the long jump event at the AAA Welsh championships.

He represented the 1958 Welsh team at the 1958 British Empire and Commonwealth Games in Cardiff, Wales, where he participated in one event; the long jump event.

At the time of the Games, he was serving his national service in the British Army.

He played 10 times for Bath making his debut on 1 October 1958.
