= Guinn Smith =

American pole vaulter (1920–2004)

Medal record

Men's athletics

Representing the United States

Olympic Games
Gold medal – first place	1948 London	Pole vault

Owen Guinn Smith (May 2, 1920 – January 20, 2004) was an American athlete, the 1948 Olympic champion in the pole vault.

Born in McKinney, Texas, Smith moved to California when he was a child. He was originally a high jumper, but UC Berkeley, the university he wanted to attend, already had a strong high jumping team, so he took up pole vaulting. He won the NCAA championships in 1941, the year before he graduated as a history major. During the remainder of World War II, Guinn Smith served as an air force pilot in Asia.

Smith, the 1947 national pole vault champion, was sent to the 1948 Olympics in London. During a rainy competition, Smith took the gold in his last attempt for 4.30 m (14 ft 1 1/4 in).

He died at age 83 in San Francisco of emphysema.
