= John Jones (sprinter) =

Welsh athlete

Personal information
- Nationality: British (Welsh)
- Born: c.1940 Wales

Sport
- Sport: Athletics
- Event: Sprints
- Club: Roath Harriers

John C. Jones (born c.1940) is a former track and field athlete from Wales, who competed at the 1958 British Empire and Commonwealth Games (now Commonwealth Games).

== Biography ==
Jones was educated at Lewis School, Pengam and was member of the Roath Harriers. He won both the 100 and 220 yards races at the Cardiff University triangular in May 1958 and recorded 22.9sec for 220 yards, which brought him to the attention of the Welsh selectors.

He represented the 1958 Welsh team at the 1958 British Empire and Commonwealth Games in Cardiff, Wales, where he participated in one event; the 220 yards race.

His time of 21.9secs set during the event was a Welsh junior record.
