= Brian Woolley (long jumper) =

Welsh athlete

Bryan Woolley
Personal information
- Nationality: British (Welsh)
- Born: 17 February 1937 Wrexham, Wales
- Died: 8 October 1992 Wrexham, Wales

Sport
- Sport: Athletics
- Event: Long Jump
- Club: Loughborough College Athletics Club

John Bryan Woolley (17 February 1937 – 8 October 1992) is a former track and field athlete from Wales, who competed at the 1958 British Empire and Commonwealth Games (now Commonwealth Games).

== Biography ==
Woolley was educated at Grove Park School, Wrexham and was a member of the Loughborough College Athletics Club. He defeated Ray Gazard in the long jump event at the 1958 AAA Welsh championships and set a Welsh record in the process.

He represented the 1958 Welsh team at the 1958 British Empire and Commonwealth Games in Cardiff, Wales, where he participated in one event; the long jump event.

Woolley won the 1955 English AAA Junior long jump title before serving his national service with the Royal Air Force. He then won the inter-counties championship at White City.

He finished second behind Fred Alsop in the long jump event at the 1960 AAA Championships.
