= Alex Grant (long jumper) =

Scottish athlete

Personal information
- Nationality: British (Scottish)
- Born: c.1934 Aberdeen, Scotland

Sport
- Sport: Athletics
- Event: Long jump
- Club: Cambridge University AC

Alexander James Grant (born c.1934) is a former track and field athlete from Scotland who competed at the 1958 British Empire and Commonwealth Games (now Commonwealth Games).

== Biography ==
Grant, from Aberdeen, was educated at Aberdeen Grammar School and Fettes College, where he captained the rugby, hockey, fives, golf and basketball teams at the latter. He studied at the University of Cambridge and was a member of their Athletic Club.

After the 1958 Scottish A.A.A. Championships, he was named on the provisional list for the forthcoming Empire Games.

He represented the Scottish Empire and Commonwealth Games team at the 1958 British Empire Games in Cardiff, Wales, participating in one event, the long jump.
