= Richard Dodd (triple jumper) =

Welsh athlete

Personal information
- Nationality: British (Welsh)
- Born: c.1934 Wrexham, Wales

Sport
- Sport: Athletics
- Event: Triple Jump
- Club: Loughborough College Athletics Club

Richard Dodd (born c.1934) is a former track and field athlete from Wales, who competed at the 1958 British Empire and Commonwealth Games (now Commonwealth Games).

== Biography ==
Dodd was educated at Ruabon Grammar School and Loughborough University and was the Welsh Secondary Schools' champion for three consecutive years from 1951 to 1953.

He was a member of the Loughborough College Athletics Club and won the hop, step and jump (triple jump) event at the 1958 AAA Welsh championships.

He represented the 1958 Welsh team at the 1958 British Empire and Commonwealth Games in Cardiff, Wales, where he participated in one event; the triple jump event.
