= Hugh Murray (triple jumper) =

Scottish athlete (1935–2023)

Personal information
- Nationality: British (Scottish)
- Born: 19 February 1935 Colwyn Bay, Wales
- Died: 9 June 2023 (aged 88) Edinburgh, Scotland

Sport
- Sport: Athletics
- Event(s): Triple jump, javelin
- Club: Edinburgh University AC

Hugh Miller Murray (19 February 1935 – 9 June 2023) was a Welsh-born track and field athlete from Scotland who competed at the 1958 British Empire and Commonwealth Games (now Commonwealth Games).

== Biography ==
Murray was born in Colwyn Bay, Wales but his family moved to New Cumnock in Ayrshire in 1939. He attended Dollar Academy and studied medicine at the University of Edinburgh, and was a member of their athletics team, specialising in the triple jump but was also proficient in the javelin. Murray was captain of his University team, won a blue and in 1957 he won the triple jump title at the S.A.A.A Championships.

He was also the president of the Edinburgh University Union and in February 1958 he was named by the Scottish AAA in the 'possibles list' for the forthcoming Commonwealth and Empire Games.

He represented the Scottish Empire and Commonwealth Games team at the 1958 British Empire Games in Cardiff, Wales, participating in one event, the triple jump.

He won the national triple jump title again at the 1963 Scottish AAA Championships. He lived in Canada for several years and worked as a GP in Saskatchewan.

Murray also won Scottish Universities' titles for Edinburgh and won the Inter-Services Championships for the army. From 1970 to 1998 he was a doctor at the Edinburgh University Students' Health Centre.
