= Billy Dundas =

Northern Irish athlete

Personal information
- Nationality: British (Northern Irish)
- Born: Cookstown, Northern Ireland
- Height: 189 cm (6 ft 2 in)

Sport
- Sport: Athletics
- Events: Sprints / middle-distance / long jump, triple jump
- Club: Royal Ulster Constabulary AC

William H. Dundas is a former athlete from Northern Ireland, who represented Northern Ireland at the British Empire and Commonwealth Games (now Commonwealth Games).

== Biography ==
Dundas was born in Cookstown and resided at Lissan Road. He was a constable with the Royal Ulster Constabulary and a member of their athletics club.

In 1954 he won the Ulster Championship and was twice Irish champion over 440 yards in both 1952 and 1953. At the 1956 Northern Ireland Championships he won the 440 yards title.

He won the 440 yards title at the 1958 Summer Athletic League trophy meeting and at the same meeting finished runner-up behind Paddy Toner in the 220 yards. and

Dundas was named by the Northern Ireland AAA in the final 1958 Northern Irish Team for the forthcoming Empire and Commonwealth Games. He subsequently competed at the 1958 British Empire and Commonwealth Games in Cardiff, Wales, participating in the one athletics event; the 440 yards,
