= Colin Kemball =

British marathon runner (1928–2004)

Personal information
- Nationality: British (English)
- Born: 18 January 1928 Wolverhampton, England
- Died: 7 April 2004 (aged 76) Wolverhampton, England

Sport
- Sport: Athletics
- Event: marathon / cross country
- Club: Wolverhampton Harriers

Colin Keith Kemball (1928–2004), was a male athlete who competed for England.

== Biography ==
Kemball was born in Wolverhampton, England and was a member of the Wolverhampton Harriers, with who he won the 15 miles Staffordshire road race title in 1957 and 1958.

Kemball became the British marathon champion after winning the British AAA Championships title at the 1958 AAA Championships. Shortly afterwards he represented the England athletics team in the marathon at the 1958 British Empire and Commonwealth Games in Cardiff, Wales.
