= Athletics at the 1954 British Empire and Commonwealth Games – Men's pole vault =

Men's pole vault at the Commonwealth Games
- Venue: Empire Stadium
- Dates: 7 August 1954

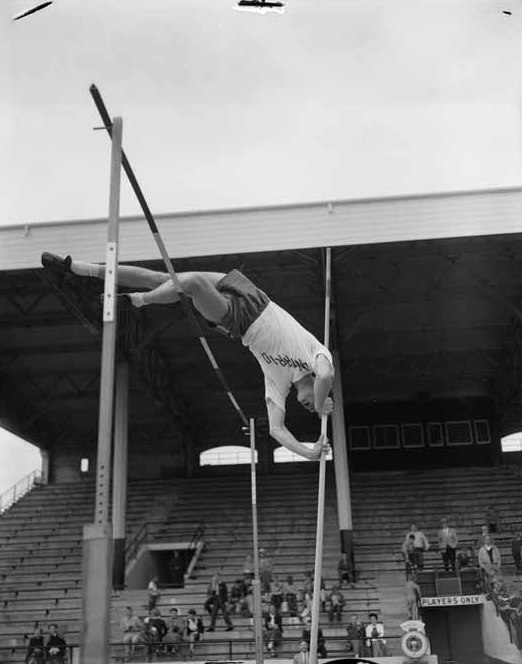
The pole vault event taking place at the games Attribution:Province newspaper

The men's pole vault event at the 1954 British Empire and Commonwealth Games was held on 7 August at the Empire Stadium in Vancouver, Canada.

== Results ==
Rank	Name	Nationality	Result	Notes
1st place, gold medalist(s)	Geoff Elliott	England	14 ft 0 in (4.27 m)	GR
2nd place, silver medalist(s)	Ron Miller	Canada	13 ft 9 1/4 in (4.20 m)	
3rd place, bronze medalist(s)	Andries Burger	South Africa	13 ft 6 3/4 in (4.13 m)	
4	Bob Adams	Canada	13 ft 0 in (3.96 m)	
5	Mervyn Richards	New Zealand	13 ft 0 in (3.96 m)	
6	Orland Anderson	Canada	13 ft 0 in (3.96 m)	
7	Bruce Peever	Australia	12 ft 6 in (3.81 m)	
8	Peter Denton	Australia	12 ft 6 in (3.81 m)	
9	Robert Reid	Canada	12 ft 6 in (3.81 m)	
