= Petro Denysenko =

Ukrainian pole vaulter

Personal information
- Full name: Petro Ivanovych Denysenko
- Nationality: Ukrainian
- Born: 13 September 1920 Liubech, Chernihiv Oblast, Ukrainian SSR
- Died: 9 August 1998 (aged 77)
- Height: 183 cm (6 ft)
- Weight: 76 kg (168 lb)

Sport
- Sport: Athletics
- Event: Pole vault

Petro Ivanovych Denysenko (13 September 1920 – 9 August 1998) was a Soviet and Ukrainian athlete. He competed in the men's pole vault at the 1952 Summer Olympics, representing the Soviet Union.
