= Gamal El-Din El-Sherbini =

Egyptian pole vaulter

Personal information
- Nationality: Egyptian
- Born: 10 August 1923 Cairo, Egypt
- Died: November 1995

Sport
- Sport: Athletics
- Event: Pole vault

Gamal El-Din El-Sherbini (10 August 1923 – November 1995) was an Egyptian athlete. He competed in the men's pole vault at the 1952 Summer Olympics.
