= Don Laz =

American pole vaulter (1929–1996)

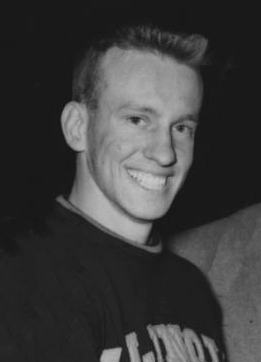
- Laz in 1951

Personal information
- Born: May 17, 1929 Chicago, U.S.
- Died: February 21, 1996 (aged 66) Champaign, Illinois, U.S.
- Education: University of Illinois
- Height: 188 cm (6 ft 2 in)
- Weight: 82 kg (181 lb)

Sport
- Sport: Athletics
- Event: Pole vault

Achievements and titles
- Personal best: 4.65 m (1952i)
Medal record
Representing United States
Olympic Games
Silver medal – second place	1952 Helsinki	Pole vault
Pan American Games
Bronze medal – third place	1955 Mexico City	Pole vault

Donald Robert Laz (May 17, 1929 – February 21, 1996) was an American pole vaulter. He won a silver medal at the 1952 Olympics and a bronze at the 1955 Pan American Games. Domestically he held the NCAA title in 1951 and shared the AAU title in 1953. After retiring from competitions he worked as an architect in Champaign, Illinois, and retired after suffering a stroke.

Competing for the Illinois Fighting Illini track and field team, Laz won the 1951 NCAA DI outdoor pole vault title.

== Personal life ==
In January 1951 Laz married Nancy June Barber They had a son Doug, who also became a competitive pole vaulter.
