= Edward Adamczyk =

Polish athlete (1921–1993)

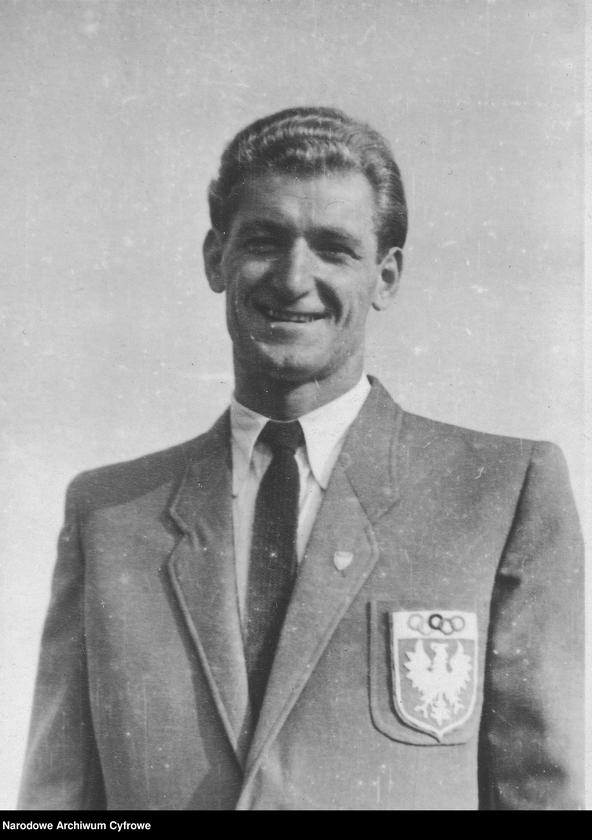
- Adamczyk in 1948

Personal information
- Nationality: Polish
- Born: 30 November 1921 Dortmund, Germany
- Died: 7 April 1993 (aged 71) Heilbronn, Germany
- Height: 1.90 m (6 ft 3 in)
- Weight: 83 kg (183 lb)

Sport
- Sport: Athletics
- Events: Long jump Decathlon
- Club: Odry Wrocław (1946–1948); Kolejarz Poznań (1949–1950); OWKS Wrocław (1951–1953); Gwardia Wrocław (1954–1956)

Edward Adamczyk (30 November 1921 – 7 April 1993) was a Polish athlete. He competed in the men's long jump and the men's decathlon at the 1948 Summer Olympics.

== International competitions ==
| Year | Competition | Venue | Position | Event | Notes |
Representing Poland
| 1947 | World Festival of Youth and Students | Prague, Czechoslovakia | 3rd | Shot put | 12.39 m |
| 1948 | Olympic Games | London, United Kingdom | 11th | Long jump | 6.735 m |
| 1948 | Olympic Games | London, United Kingdom | 9th | Decathlon | 6712 pts |
| 1949 | World Festival of Youth and Students | Budapest, Hungary | 1st | Long jump | 7.27 m |
| 1950 | European Championships | Brussels, Belgium | 7th | Decathlon | 6447 pts |
| 1951 | World Festival of Youth and Students | East Berlin, East Germany | 2nd | Pole vault | 4.10 m |
| 1954 | World Student Games | Budapest, Hungary | 2nd | Pole vault | 4.15 m |
| 1954 | European Championships | Bern, Switzerland | 9th | Pole vault | 4.25 m |

== Personal bests ==
- 400 metres – 51.2 seconds (Warsaw 1950)
- 110 metres hurdles – 15.3 seconds (Kraków 1948)
- High jump – 1.80 metres (Warsaw 1948)
- Pole vault – 4.43 metres (Poznań 1955)
- Long jump – 7.44 metres (Poznań 1949)
- Shot put – 14.80 metres (Katowice 1949)
- Discus throw – 43.81 metres (Poznań 1950)
- Decathlon – 6907 points (Warsaw 1950)
