= Walter Hofstetter =

Swiss pole vaulter (born 1923)

Personal information
- Nationality: Swiss
- Born: 26 March 1923 Bern, Switzerland
- Died: c. 2011

Sport
- Sport: Athletics
- Event: Pole vault

Walter Hofstetter (26 March 1923 – c. 2011) was a Swiss athlete. He competed in the men's pole vault at the 1952 Summer Olympics.
