= Bob Cockburn =

Scottish athlete

Personal information
- Nationality: British (Scottish)

Sport
- Sport: Athletics
- Event: Sprints
- Club: Edinburgh Southern Harriers

Robert B. Cockburn is a former track and field athlete from Scotland who competed at the 1958 British Empire and Commonwealth Games (now Commonwealth Games).

== Biography ==
Cockburn was a member of the Edinburgh Southern Harriers (ESH) and a Scottish international.

In 1956 he returned to the ESH club after three years absence from Edinburgh and in 1958 he won the East of Scotland championship.

At the 1958 Scottish AAA Championships, he finished runner-up to Gavin Carragher in the 220 yards final.

He represented the Scottish Empire and Commonwealth Games team at the 1958 British Empire Games in Cardiff, Wales, participating in two events, the 100 yards and the 220 yards.

Cockburn later became an athletics coach.
