= Ragnar Lundberg =

Swedish pole vaulter

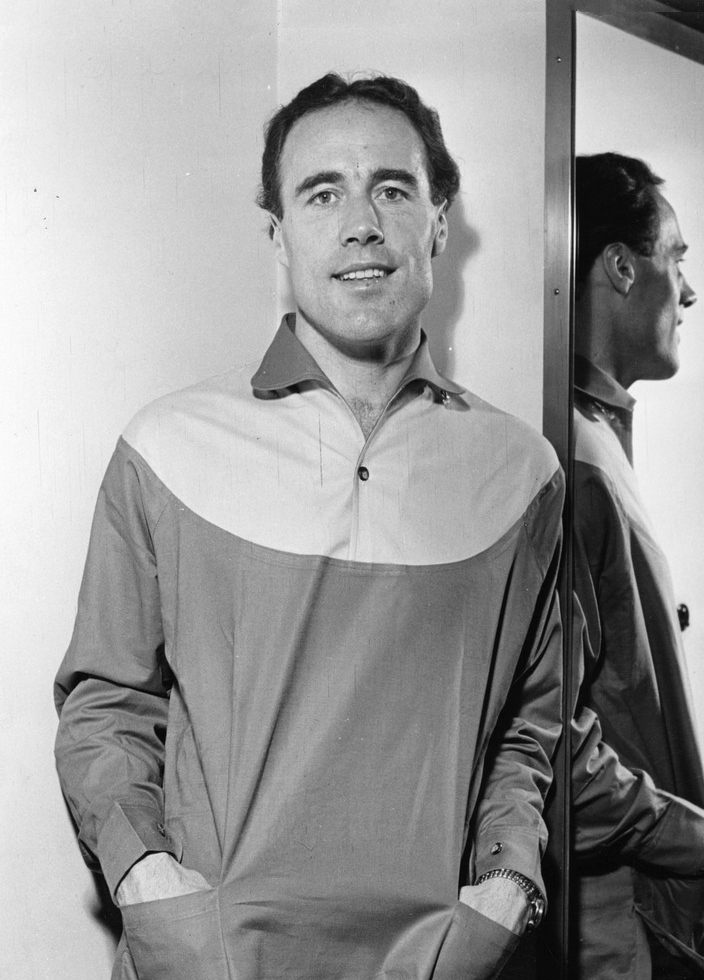
- Lundberg in 1956

Personal information
- Born: 22 September 1924 Madesjö, Nybro, Sweden
- Died: 10 July 2011 (aged 86) Kalmar, Sweden
- Height: 1.81 m (5 ft 11 in)
- Weight: 73 kg (161 lb)

Sport
- Sport: Athletics
- Event(s): Pole vault, hurdles
- Club: IFK Södertälje

Achievements and titles
- Personal best(s): PV – 4.46 m (1956); 110 mH – 14.7 (1950)
Medal record
Men's athletics
Representing Sweden
Olympic Games
Bronze medal – third place	1952 Helsinki	Pole vault
European Championships
Gold medal – first place	1950 Brussels	Pole vault
Silver medal – second place	1950 Brussels	110 m hurdles
Silver medal – second place	1954 Bern	Pole vault

Ragnar "Ragge" Torsten Lundberg (22 September 1924 – 10 July 2011) was a Swedish pole vaulter who competed at the 1948, 1952 and 1956 Olympics. He won a bronze medal in 1952 and finished fifth in 1948 and 1956. At the European championships he won a gold in 1950 and a silver in 1954; in 1950 he also won a silver medal in the 110 m hurdles.

During his career Lundberg improved the European pole vault record from 4.32 m to 4.44 m (1948–52) and the Swedish record from 4.21 m to 4.46 m. He held national titles in the pole vault (1948–58) and 110 m hurdles (1949–51 and 1953).
