= Edmondo Ballotta =

Italian pole vaulter

Personal information
- National team: Italy (18 caps from 1949 to 1958)
- Born: 5 March 1930 (age 96) Caorso, Italy

Sport
- Sport: Sport of athletics
- Event: Pole vault

Achievements and titles
- Personal best: Pole vault: 4.20 m (1958)
Medal record
Summer International University Sports Week
| Gold medal – first place | 1955 San Sebastian | Pole vault |

Edmondo Ballotta (21 December 1930) is a former Italian male pole vaulter who won six national titles at individual senior level.

== Biography ==
Ballotta competed in the pole vault in two finals at the European Championships. He is the husband of the former Italian discus thrower Elivia Ricci.

== Achievements ==
| Year | Competition | Venue | Position | Event | Performance | Notes |
|---|---|---|---|---|---|---|
| 1954 | European Championships | (Switzerland) Bern | 12th | Pole vault | 4.10 m | |
| 1958 | European Championships | (Sweden) Stockholm | 13th | Pole vault | 4.20 m | PB |

== National titles ==
He won 6 national championships at individual senior level.

- Italian Athletics Championships
  - Pole vault: 1952, 1954, 1955, 1956, 1957, 1958
