= Viktor Knyazev =

Soviet pole vaulter

Personal information
- Nationality: Soviet
- Born: 2 March 1925

Sport
- Sport: Athletics
- Event: Pole vault

Viktor Knyazev (born 2 March 1925) was a Soviet athlete. He competed in the men's pole vault at the 1952 Summer Olympics.
