= Erkki Kataja =

Finnish pole vaulter (1924–1969)

Medal record

Men's athletics

Representing Finland

Olympic Games
Silver medal – second place	1948 London	Pole vault

Erkki Olavi Kataja (19 June 1924 in Kuusankoski – 27 April 1969) was a Finnish athlete, who competed mainly in the pole vault.

Kataja competed for Finland in the 1948 Summer Olympics held in London, Great Britain where he won the silver medal in the pole vault event.
