= Tamás Homonnay =

Hungarian pole vaulter

Personal information
- Nationality: Hungarian
- Born: 2 January 1926 Budapest, Hungary
- Died: 30 May 2013 (aged 87) Monroe, Connecticut, USA
- Height: 186 cm (6 ft 1 in)
- Weight: 78 kg (172 lb)

Sport
- Sport: Athletics
- Event: Pole vault
- Club: Vasas, Budapest

Tamás Homonnay (2 January 1926 – 30 May 2013) was a Hungarian athlete. He competed in the men's pole vault at the 1952 Summer Olympics.

Homonnay finished second behind Peter Harwood in the pole vault event at the British 1949 AAA Championships. and won the British AAA Championships title at the 1954 AAA Championships.
