= Zeno Dragomir =

Romanian pole vaulter (born 1923)

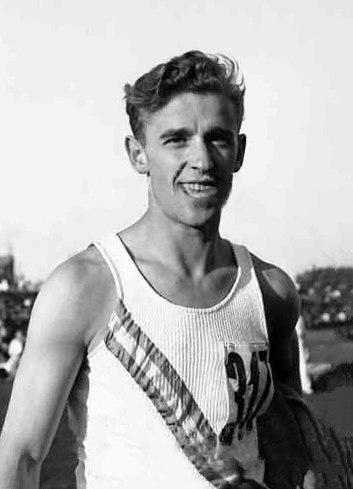
- Dragomir in 1947

Personal information
- Born: 27 June 1923
- Died: September 1967 (aged 44)

Sport
- Sport: Athletics
- Event: Pole vault

Achievements and titles
- Personal best: 4.20 m (1952)

Zeno Dragomir (27 June 1923 – September 1967) was a Romanian pole vaulter. He competed at the 1952 Olympics in Helsinki and placed 18th.
