= Jacques Pirlot =

Belgian footballer

Personal information
- Date of birth: 7 June 1896

International career
Years	Team	Apps	(Gls)
1922	Belgium	1	(0)

Jacques Pirlot (born 7 June 1896, date of death unknown) was a Belgian footballer. He played in one match for the Belgium national football team in 1922.
