= Allan Lindberg =

Swedish pole vaulter

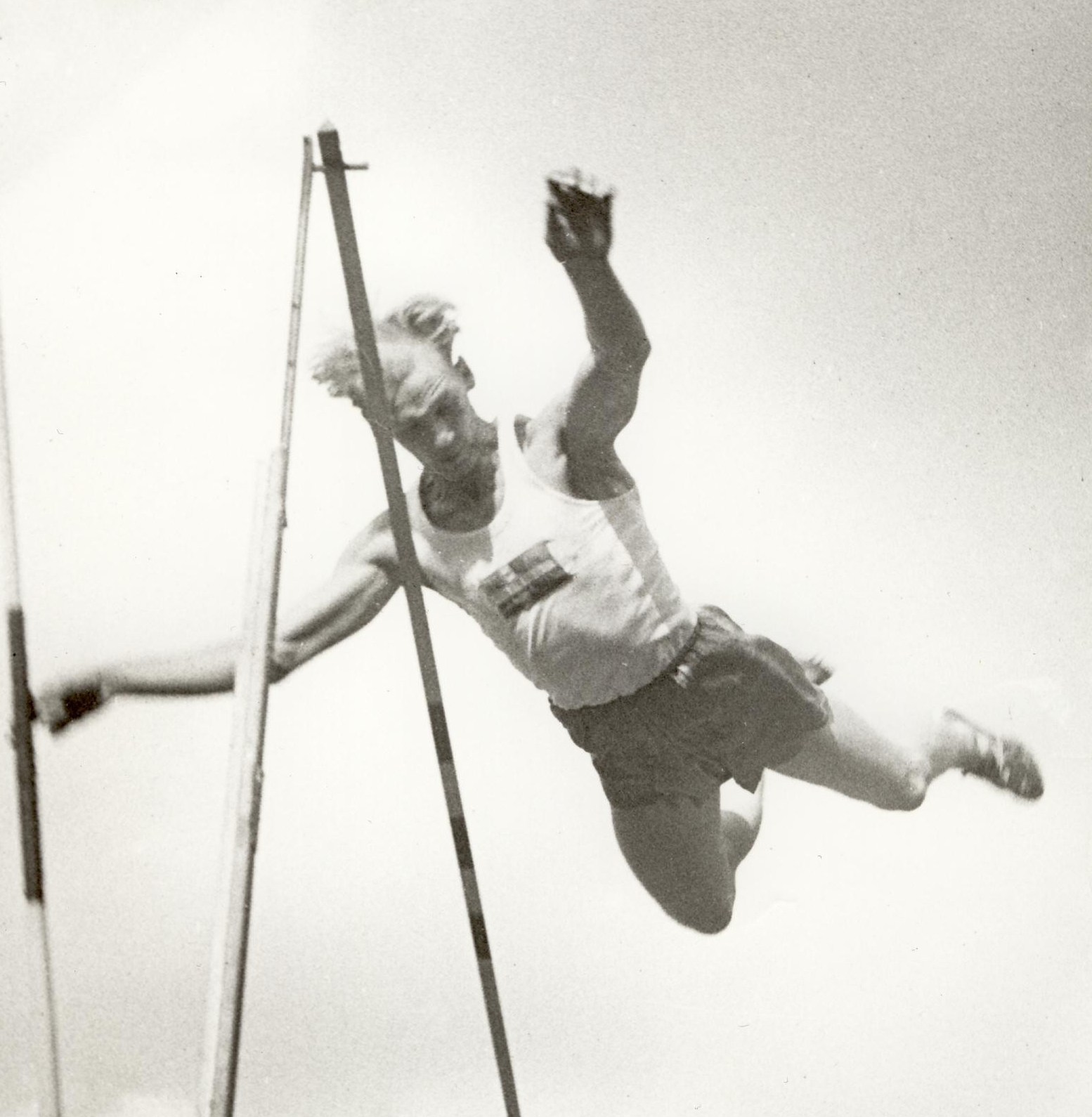

Personal information
- Born: 21 June 1918 Fagersta, Sweden
- Died: 2 May 2004 (aged 85) Garphyttan, Sweden

Sport
- Sport: Athletics
- Event: Pole vault
- Club: Fagersta AIK

Achievements and titles
- Personal best: 4.20 (1946)
Medal record
Men's athletics
Representing Sweden
European Championships
Gold medal – first place	1946 Oslo	Pole vault

John Allan Lindberg (21 June 1918 – 2 May 2004) was a Swedish pole vaulter. In 1946 he won the national title and the 1946 European Athletics Championships, setting a national record. He finished 12th at the 1948 Summer Olympics.
