= John Scott-Oldfield =

John Richard Anthony Scott-Oldfield (born 1933), former athlete

Personal information
- Nationality: British (English)
- Born: July 1933 Cawnpore, India
- Died: 24 March 2022 (aged 88)

Sport
- Sport: British (English)
- Event: Athletics
- Club: Cambridge University AC; Achilles Club

John Richard Anthony Scott-Oldfield (1933 – 24 March 2022), was a British athlete who competed for England.

== Biography ==
Scott-Oldfield lived in Manchester, was schooled at Priory Park and studied law at St Catharine's College, Cambridge.

Scott-Oldfield became the British 220 yards hurdles champion after winning the British AAA Championships title at the 1957 AAA Championships.

He represented the England athletics team in the 220 yards race at the 1958 British Empire and Commonwealth Games in Cardiff, Wales.

He died on 24 March, 2022, at the age of 88.
