= Gordon Day =

South African sprinter

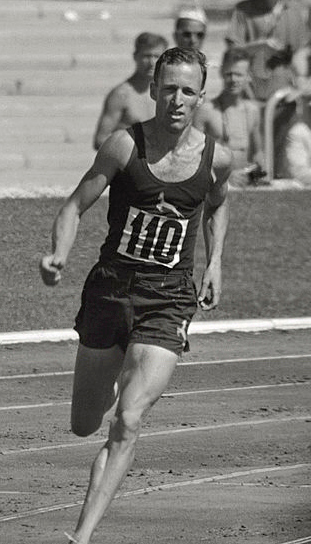
- Gordon Day at the 1960 Olympics

Personal information
- Born: 4 January 1936 (age 90) Alexander Bay, Cape Province, Union of South Africa
- Died: 3 February 2026 Johannesburg
- Height: 1.85 m (6 ft 1 in)
- Weight: 74 kg (163 lb)

Sport
- Sport: Athletics
- Event: 400 metres

Achievements and titles
- Personal best: 400 m – 45.8y (1959)
Medal record
Representing South Africa
British Empire and Commonwealth Games
Gold medal – first place	1958 Cardiff	4×440 yd relay
Bronze medal – third place	1958 Cardiff	220 yd

Gordon Raymond Day (born 4 January 1936) is a retired South African sprinter. He competed at the 1960 Summer Olympics in the 400 metres and 4×400 metres relay events and finished fourth in the relay. He was part of the South African team that won the 4×440 yards relay at the 1958 British Empire and Commonwealth Games, while finishing third in the individual 220 yards.
