= Armin Scheurer =

Swiss athlete

Armin Scheurer (December 24, 1917 – August 27, 1990) was a Swiss athlete. He held nine national records for his nation. He also coached football. In 1950 he was Swiss Sports Personality of the Year.

He was a decathlete during his active career and competed in that discipline at the 1948 Summer Olympics, but failed to finish. He was fourth at the 1946 European Athletics Championships and fifth at the 1950 European Athletics Championships, managing sixth in the individual pole vault at the latter event.
