= Hugo Göllors =

Swedish pole vaulter (1919–1977)

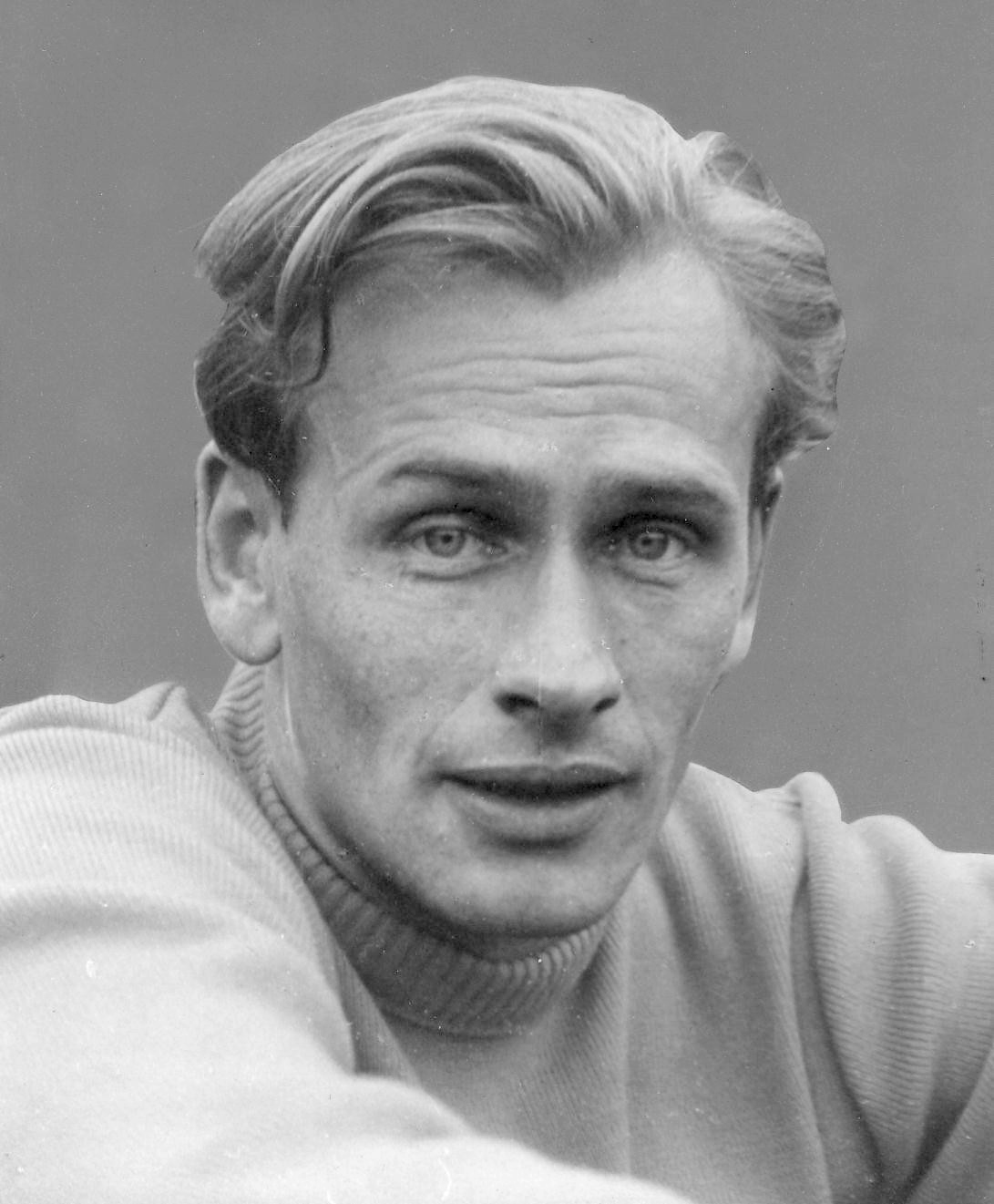

Personal information
- Born: 16 November 1919 Malung, Sweden
- Died: 7 February 1977 (aged 57) Malung, Sweden
- Height: 1.76 m (5 ft 9 in)
- Weight: 75 kg (165 lb)

Sport
- Sport: Athletics
- Event: Pole vault
- Club: Malungs IF

Achievements and titles
- Personal best: 4.15 m (1947)

Olov Hugo Göllors (16 November 1919 – 7 February 1977) was a Swedish pole vaulter. He competed at the 1946 European Athletics Championships and 1948 Summer Olympics and finished in fifth and seventh place, respectively. He won the national title in 1942 and 1947.
