= Geoff Elliott =

English pole vaulter, shot putter & decathlete

Personal information
- Nationality: British (English)
- Born: 7 April 1931 Ilford, England
- Died: 12 October 2014 (aged 83) Calgary, Alberta
- Height: 179 cm (5 ft 10 in)
- Weight: 80 kg (176 lb)

Sport
- Sport: Athletics
- Event: decathlon/pole vault/shot put
- Club: Woodford Green AC
Medal record
Men's athletics
Representing Great Britain
European Championships
Bronze medal – third place	1954 Bern	Pole vault
Representing England
British Empire and Commonwealth Games
Gold medal – first place	1954 Vancouver	Pole vault
Gold medal – first place	1958 Cardiff	Pole vault

Geoffrey Michael Elliott (7 April 1931 – 12 October 2014) was a pole vaulter, shot putter and decathlete from England who competed at the 1952 Summer Olympics.

== Biography ==
Elliott born in Ilford, finished second behind Harry Whittle in the decathlon event at the 1950 AAA Championships.

Elliott represented the Great Britain team at the 1952 Olympic Games in Helsinki in both the pole vault and decathlon events.

Elliott became the British pole vault champion after winning the British AAA Championships title at the 1952 AAA Championships. He would go on to win it again at the 1953 AAA Championships and the 1955 AAA Championships.

He set his personal best in the pole vault (4.30 metres) on 28 August 1954 in Bern.

He represented England and won a gold medal in the pole vault at the 1954 British Empire and Commonwealth Games in Vancouver, Canada. Four years later, in Cardiff he repeated the success at the 1958 British Empire and Commonwealth Games. Just before those games, he was one of many signatories in a letter to The Times on 17 July 1958 opposing 'the policy of apartheid' in international sport and defending 'the principle of racial equality which is embodied in the Declaration of the Olympic Games'.

== Achievements ==
Year	Competition	Venue	Position	Notes
1954	European Championships	Bern, Switzerland	3rd	Pole vault
1954	British Empire and Commonwealth Games	Vancouver, Canada	1st	Pole vault
1954	British Empire and Commonwealth Games	Vancouver, Canada	8th	Shot put
1958	British Empire and Commonwealth Games	Cardiff, Wales	1st	Pole vault
