= Allan Dunbar =

Scottish athlete

Personal information
- Nationality: British (Scottish)
- Born: 6 February 1934 Stranraer, Scotland
- Died: 1 July 2011 Edinburgh, Scotland

Sport
- Sport: Athletics
- Event: Sprints
- Club: Victoria Park AAC

Allan Sisson Dunbar (6 February 1934 – 1 July, 2011) was a track and field athlete from Scotland who competed at the 1958 British Empire and Commonwealth Games (now Commonwealth Games).

== Biography ==
Dunbar studied at the University of Glasgow and the Royal Scottish Academy of Music and Drama and was a member of the Victoria Park AAC. He was a teacher by profession, teaching speech and drama at Langside College in the late 1950s. He also represented Jordanhill Training College in competition.

Dunbar was twice Scottish champion over 100 yards and in February 1958 he was named by the Scottish AAA in the 'possibles list' for the forthcoming Commonwealth and Empire Games.

He represented the Scottish Empire and Commonwealth Games team at the 1958 British Empire Games in Cardiff, Wales, participating in one event, the 100 yards race.

Dunbar later taught drama at Queen Mary College for ten years. He died in 2011.
