= Valto Olenius =

Finnish pole vaulter (1920–1983)

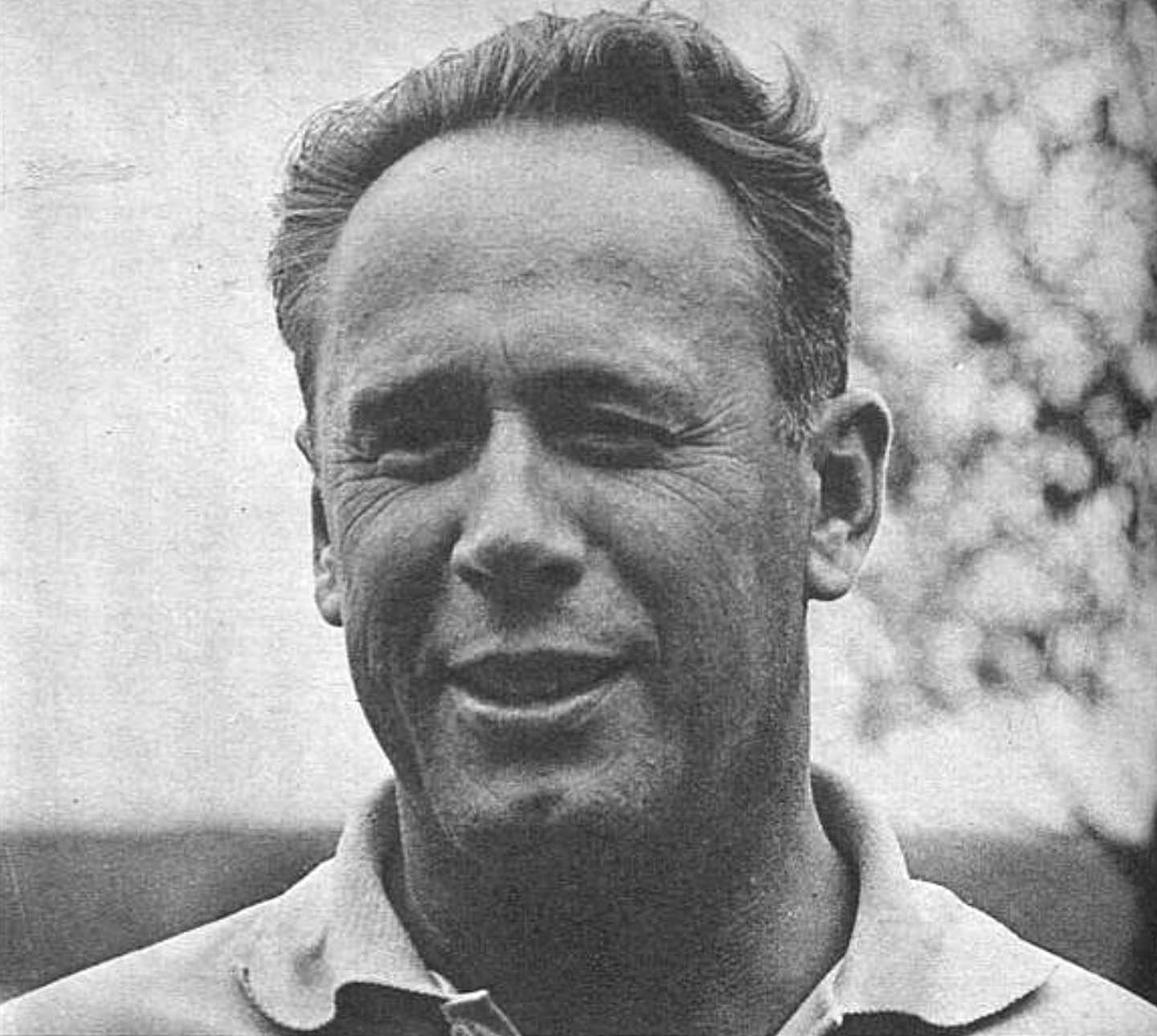
- Portrait of Valor Rudolf Olenius

Medal record

Men's athletics

Representing Finland

European Championships
Silver medal – second place	1950 Brussels	Pole vault

Valto Rudolf Olenius (12 December 1920 in Karkkila – 13 July 1983 in Heinola) was a Finnish pole vaulter who competed in the 1948 Summer Olympics and in the 1952 Summer Olympics.
