= Jukka Piironen =

Finnish pole vaulter

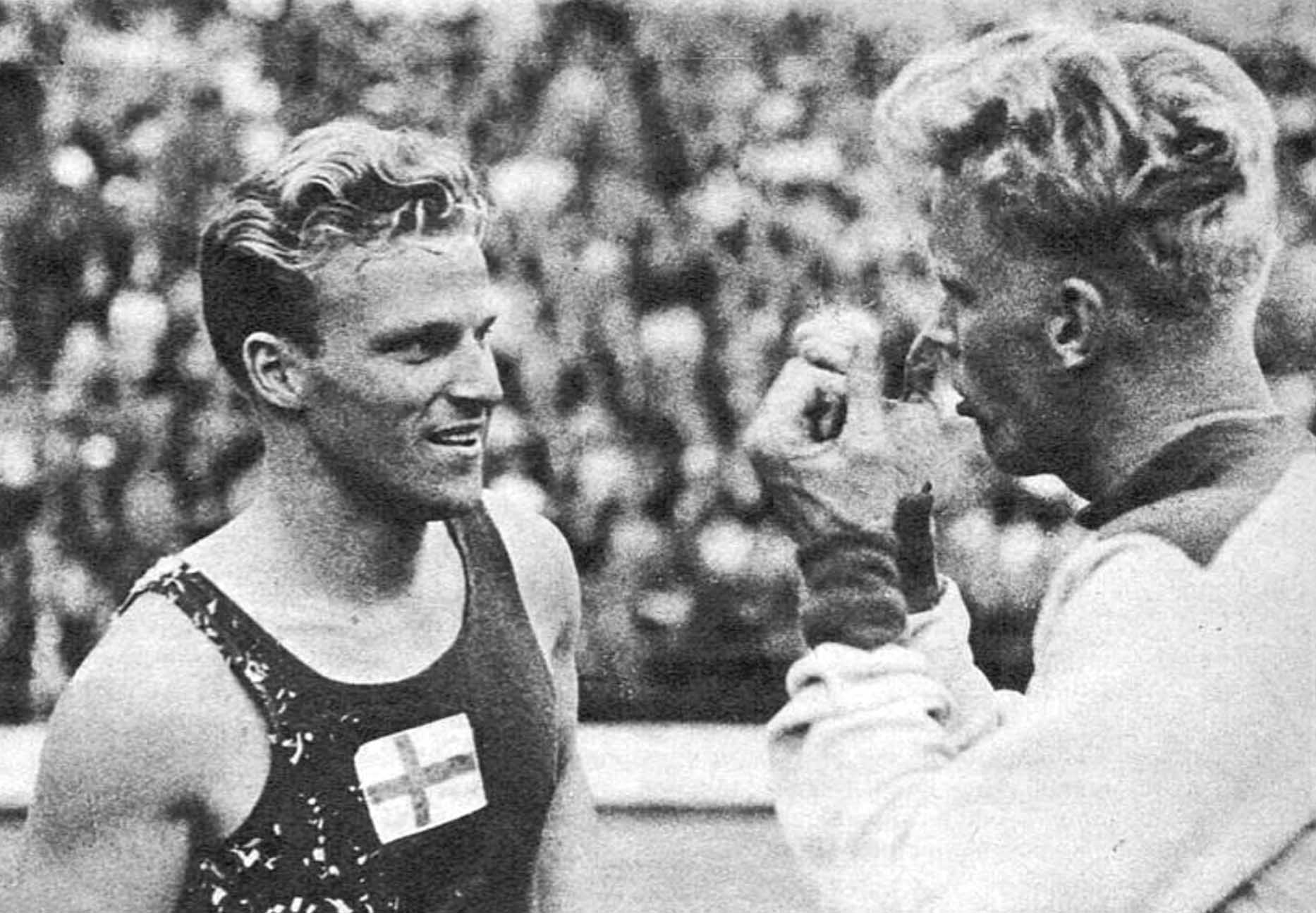
- Finnish pole vaulters at Finland–Hungary games, July 1955 in Helsinki

Medal record

Men's athletics

Representing Finland

European Championships
Bronze medal – third place	1954 Bern	Pole vault

Jukka Piironen (11 August 1925 – 5 March 1976) was a Finnish pole vaulter who competed in the 1952 Summer Olympics. Piironen was born in Leppävirta and died in Helsinki, aged 50.
