= Maurice Rich =

Australian triple jumper (1932–2022)

Personal information
- Nationality: Australian
- Born: 20 January 1932 Queensland, Australia
- Died: 22 October 2022 (aged 90) Queensland, Australia

Sport
- Sport: Athletics
- Event: Triple jump

Maurice William Rich (20 January 1932 – 22 October 2022) was an Australian athlete who competed at the 1956 Summer Olympics.

== Biography ==
Rich represented Australia at the 1956 Olympic Games in Melbourne, where he participated in the men's triple jump event.

Rich finished third behind Dave Norris in the triple jump event at the British 1958 AAA Championships.

Rich died on 22 October 2022, at the age of 90.
