= Erasmus Amukun =

Ugandan sprinter

Personal information
- Full name: Erasmus Samuel A. O. Amukun
- Nationality: Ugandan
- Born: 27 November 1940 Ngora, Kumi, Uganda
- Died: May 1998 (aged 67)

Sport
- Sport: Sprinting
- Event: 100 metres

Erasmus Samuel A. O. "Sam" Amukun (27 November 1940 – May 1998) was a Ugandan sprinter. He competed in the men's 100 metres, men's 200 metres and men's 4 x 100 metres relay at the 1960 Summer Olympics who competed in the men's 200 metres and men's 4 x 100 metres relay at the 1964 Summer Olympics.

After the Olympics, he worked as a geologist.
