= Jimmy Omagbemi =

Nigerian sprinter

Personal information
- Nationality: Nigerian
- Born: 26 November 1930 Warri, Delta, Nigeria
- Died: 12 November 2012 (aged 81) Hooks, Texas, USA
- Height: 178 cm (5 ft 10 in)
- Weight: 68 kg (150 lb)

Sport
- Sport: Athletics
- Event: Sprints
Medal record
Men's athletics
Representing Nigeria
British Empire and Commonwealth Games
Silver medal – second place	1958 Cardiff	4 × 110 yd relay

James Stephen Omajuwa Omagbemi (26 November 1930 – 12 November 2012) was a Nigerian track and field athlete who competed at two Olympic Games.

== Biography ==
Omagbemi won the British AAA Championships title in the 100 yards event at the 1958 AAA Championships. Shortly afterwards he represented the country at the 1958 Commonwealth Games in Cardiff. At the games, he was fifth in the 100 yards and won silver in the 4×100 yards relay.

He participated in the 1960 Summer Olympics and 1964 Summer Olympics but did not medal. He attended San Jose State College and was coached by Bud Winter.

== Competition record ==
Year	Competition	Venue	Position	Event	Notes
Representing Nigeria
1958	Commonwealth Games	Cardiff	5th	100 Yards	9.7 secs
1958	Commonwealth Games	Cardiff	2nd	4 X 100 Yards	
1960	Summer Olympics	Rome, Italy	Heat	100 meters	26.20 m
