= Gavin Carragher =

Australian sprinter

Personal information
- Nationality: Australian / Scottish
- Born: 17 July 1933 (age 92)

Sport
- Sport: Athletics
- Event: Sprinting
- Club: London AC; Club Randwick-Kensington

Graham Gavin Hugh Carragher (born 17 July 1933) is an Australian / Scottish sprinter who competed at the 1956 Summer Olympics.

== Biography ==
At the 1956 Olympic Games in Melbourne, Australia, Carragher participated in the men's 100 metres event.

He was selected for the 1958 Scottish team for the 1958 British Empire and Commonwealth Games in Cardiff, Wales, where he competed in the 100 yards event.
