= Erling Kaas =

Norwegian pole vaulter (1915–1996)

Erling Kaas (19 August 1915 – 17 June 1996) was a Norwegian pole vaulter. He represented IK Tjalve.

At the 1948 Summer Olympics, he finished fourth in the pole vault final with a vault of 4.10 metres. At the 1952 Summer Olympics he finished sixteenth with 3.80 m. He finished fourth at the 1946 European Championships and fifth at the 1950 European Championships, both times with 4.10 m. He became Norwegian champion in 1939 and 1946-1952.

His personal best jump was 4.31 metres, achieved in July 1948 on Bislett stadion.
