= Joe Goddard (athlete) =

Trinidadian sprinter (1933–2019)

Joseph Gabriel Goddard
Personal information
- Nationality: Trinidadian
- Born: 4 February 1933 Scarborough, Tobago
- Died: 22 February 2019 (aged 86)

Sport
- Sport: Sprinting
- Event: 100 metres

Joseph Gabriel Goddard (4 February 1933 – 22 February 2019) was a Trinidadian sprinter. He competed in the men's 100 metres at the 1956 Summer Olympics.
