= Gordon Hamilton (athlete) =

Northern Irish athlete (born c.1935)

Personal information
- Nationality: British (Northern Irish)
- Born: c.1935

Sport
- Sport: Athletics
- Events: Sprints, long jump
- Club: Queens Univ AC; Instonians AC

N. Gordon Hamilton (born c.1935) is a former athlete from Northern Ireland, who represented Northern Ireland at the British Empire and Commonwealth Games (now Commonwealth Games).

== Biography ==
Hamilton studied medicine at the Queen's University Belfast and won the Kenneth Holmes Cup for the outstanding athlete at their 1956 annual meeting after winning the 100 and 220 yards and the long jump. Shortly afterwards at the British Universities Championships he won the long jump title and then just two weeks later at the Northern Ireland Championships he retained his long jump title.

Hamilton won the long jump event during the international match against Scotland in September 1957. In May 1958 he was selected for the first trials relay team at Paisley Park, with the view to forming the relay squad for the Empire Games.

Hamilton was named by the Northern Ireland AAA in the final 1958 Northern Irish Team for the forthcoming Empire and Commonwealth Games. He subsequently competed at the 1958 British Empire and Commonwealth Games in Cardiff, Wales, participating in the two athletics events; the 100 yards and the long jump.

Hamilton also played rugby union for Queen's and Ulster and had trials for the Irish national team.
