= Smart Akraka =

Nigerian sprinter (1934–2016)

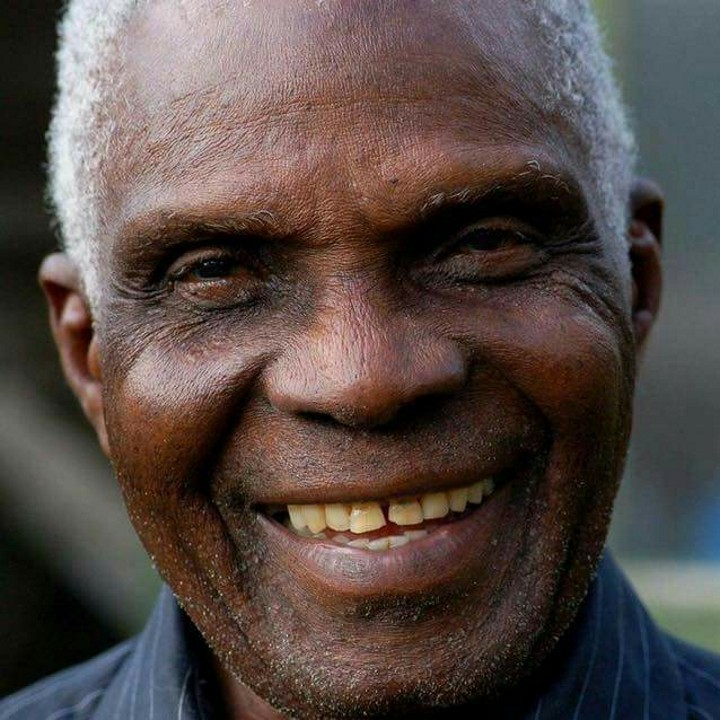
- Smart Akraka in 2015.

Personal information
- Nationality: Nigerian
- Born: 13 April 1934 Lagos, Nigeria
- Died: 8 June 2016 (aged 82) Bayelsa, Nigeria

Sport
- Sport: Sprinting
- Event: 4 × 100 metres relay

Smart Ekiyegha-Akraka (13 April 1934 – 8 June 2016) was a Nigerian sprinter. He competed in the men's 4 × 100 metres relay at the 1960 Summer Olympics.

His daughter Maria Akraka is a former 800 metres runner.
