= Athletics at the 1968 Summer Olympics – Women's 400 metres =

Women's 400 metres at the Games of the XIX Olympiad
- Venue: Estadio Olímpico Universitario
- Date: October 14–16, 1968
- Competitors: 29 from 22 nations
- Winning time: 52.0

Medalists
1st place, gold medalist(s)		Colette Besson	France
2nd place, silver medalist(s)		Lillian Board	Great Britain
3rd place, bronze medalist(s)		Natalya Pechonkina	Soviet Union

The Women's 400 metres competition at the 1968 Summer Olympics in Mexico City, Mexico was held at the University Olympic Stadium on October 14–16.

== Summary ==
In the final, running in lane 1, Lillian Board went out fast, making up the stagger on Aurelia Pentón in lane 2. In lane 4, Jarvis Scott did the same to Colette Besson in lane 5 who was passing Mirna van der Hoeven-Jansen in 6. On the backstretch, Scott opened up a clear lead on the field. Through the final turn, Natalya Pechonkina in lane 8 started to make headway against Scott's lead, with Board sandwiching the challenge from the inside. Coming off the turn, Board attacked and took the lead, Besson was still more than two metres behind Scott, but the rush was on. Besson shot past Scott and gained on Board with every step. After her early exuberance, Scott had no answer. Besson passed Board 10 metres before the line with Pechonkina taking bronze well ahead of Janet Simpson.

== Competition format ==
The Women's 400 m competition consisted of heats (Round 1), Semifinals and a Final. The four fastest competitors from each race in the heats qualified for the Semifinals. The four fastest competitors from each of the Semifinal races qualified for the final.

== Records ==
Prior to the competition, the existing World and Olympic records were as follows.

World record	Shin Geum-Dan (PRK)	51.9	Pyongyang, North Korea	October 23, 1962
Olympic record	Betty Cuthbert (AUS)	52.0	Tokyo, Japan	October 17, 1964

== Results ==
=== Round 1 ===
==== Heat 1 ====
Rank	Athlete	Nation	Time (hand)	Time (automatic)	Notes
1	Colette Besson	France	53.1	53.11	Q
2	Jarvis Scott	United States	53.5	53.53	Q
3	Helga Henning	West Germany	53.5	53.58	Q
4	Joan Fisher	Canada	54.6	54.62	Q
5	Enriqueta Basilio	Mexico	55.6	55.47	
6	Joyce Bennett	Australia	56.5	56.56	

==== Heat 2 ====
Rank	Athlete	Nation	Time (hand)	Time (automatic)	Notes
1	Aurelia Pentón	Cuba	52.8	52.86	Q
2	Lillian Board	Great Britain	52.9	53.00	Q
3	Ingrida Verbele	Soviet Union	54.0	54.07	Q
4	Una Morris	Jamaica	54.1	54.19	Q
5	Anne Covell	Canada	54.3	54.34	
6	Anna Chmelková	Czechoslovakia	54.9	54.91	
7	Antónia Munkácsi	Hungary	55.6	55.61	
8	Jean Robotham	Costa Rica	58.2	58.25	

==== Heat 3 ====
Rank	Athlete	Nation	Time (hand)	Time (automatic)	Notes
1	Mirna van der Hoeven-Jansen	Netherlands	53.1	53.17	Q
2	Esther Stroy	United States	53.5	53.58	Q
3	Janet Simpson	Great Britain	53.6	53.63	Q
4	Monique Noirot	France	53.6	53.67	Q
5	Tekla Chemabwai	Kenya	54.0	54.05	
6	Sandra Brown	Australia	55.4	55.43	
7	Hana Shezifi	Israel	56.3	56.38	

==== Heat 4 ====
Rank	Athlete	Nation	Time (hand)	Time (automatic)	Notes
1	Natalya Pechonkina	Soviet Union	53.7	53.73	Q
2	Mary Green	Great Britain	53.9	54.00	Q
3	Karin Wallgren	Sweden	54.2	54.30	Q
4	Lois Anne Drinkwater	United States	54.5	54.56	Q
5	Donata Govoni	Italy	54.7	54.77	
6	Eeva Haimi	Finland	55.0	55.01	
7	Josefa Vicent	Uruguay	56.3	56.34	
8	Olajumoke Bodunrin	Nigeria	57.0	57.09	

=== Semifinals ===
==== Semifinal 1 ====
Rank	Athlete	Nation	Time (hand)	Time (automatic)	Notes
1	Helga Henning	West Germany	53.3	53.33	Q
2	Colette Besson	France	53.6	53.62	Q
3	Janet Simpson	Great Britain	54.0	54.01	Q
4	Aurelia Pentón	Cuba	54.0	54.08	Q
5	Esther Stroy	United States	54.3	54.35	
6	Una Morris	Jamaica	54.6	54.63	
7	Ingrida Verbele	Soviet Union	54.6	54.67	
8	Joan Fisher	Canada	55.2	55.37	

==== Semifinal 2 ====
Rank	Athlete	Nation	Time (hand)	Time (automatic)	Notes
1	Lillian Board	Great Britain	52.5	52.56	Q
2	Mirna van der Hoeven-Jansen	Netherlands	52.6	52.69	Q
3	Natalya Pechonkina	Soviet Union	52.8	52.83	Q
4	Jarvis Scott	United States	53.2	53.22	Q
5	Mary Green	Great Britain	53.6	53.64	
6	Karin Wallgren	Sweden	53.9	53.93	
7	Monique Noirot	France	54.2	54.30	
8	Lois Drinkwater	United States	57.3	57.39	

=== Final ===
Rank	Athlete	Nation	Time (hand)	Time (automatic)	Notes
1st place, gold medalist(s)	Colette Besson	France	52.0	52.03	
2nd place, silver medalist(s)	Lillian Board	Great Britain	52.1	52.12	
3rd place, bronze medalist(s)	Natalya Pechonkina	Soviet Union	52.2	52.25	
4	Janet Simpson	Great Britain	52.5	52.57	
5	Aurelia Pentón	Cuba	52.7	52.75	
6	Jarvis Scott	United States	52.7	52.79	
7	Helga Henning	West Germany	52.8	52.89	
8	Mirna van der Hoeven-Jansen	Netherlands	53.0	53.02	
