= 1967 European Indoor Games – Women's 400 metres =

The women's 400 metres event at the 1967 European Indoor Games was held on 11 and 12 March in Prague.

== Medalists ==
Gold	Silver	Bronze
Karin Wallgren; Sweden	Lia Louer; Netherlands	Ljiljana Petnjarić; Yugoslavia

== Results ==
=== Heats ===
Held on 11 March

First 2 from each heat (Q) qualified directly for the semifinals.

Rank	Heat	Name	Nationality	Time	Notes
1	1	Ljiljana Petnjarić	Yugoslavia	1:04.2	Q
2	1	Karin Wallgren	Sweden	1:04.6	Q
	1	Anna Chmelková	Czechoslovakia	DQ	
1	2	Lia Louer	Netherlands	56.3	Q
2	2	Lyudmila Samotyosova	Soviet Union	57.5	Q
3	2	Rita Kühne	East Germany	57.6	
1	3	Libuše Macounová	Czechoslovakia	1:00.8	Q
2	3	Monique Noirot	France	1:01.3	Q
1	4	Nadezhda Syeropegina	Soviet Union	55.9	Q
2	4	Antónia Munkácsi	Hungary	56.0	Q
3	4	Helga Henning	West Germany	56.9	

=== Semifinals ===
Held on 11 March

First 2 from each heat (Q) qualified directly for the final.

Rank	Heat	Name	Nationality	Time	Notes
1	1	Karin Wallgren	Sweden	55.9	Q
2	1	Lia Louer	Netherlands	56.2	Q
3	1	Libuše Macounová	Czechoslovakia	56.6	
4	1	Nadezhda Syeropegina	Soviet Union	57.1	
1	2	Ljiljana Petnjarić	Yugoslavia	57.6	Q
2	2	Lyudmila Samotyosova	Soviet Union	58.5	Q
	2	Monique Noirot	France	DNF	
	2	Antónia Munkácsi	Hungary	DNF	

=== Final ===
Held on 12 March

Rank	Name	Nationality	Time	Notes
1st place, gold medalist(s)	Karin Wallgren	Sweden	55.7	
2nd place, silver medalist(s)	Lia Louer	Netherlands	56.7	
3rd place, bronze medalist(s)	Ljiljana Petnjarić	Yugoslavia	57.3	
	Lyudmila Samotyosova	Soviet Union	DNS	
