= Athletics at the 1964 Summer Olympics – Women's 400 metres =

Women's 400 metres at the Games of the XVIII Olympiad
- Venue: Olympic Stadium
- Dates: 15–17 October 1964
- Competitors: 23 from 17 nations
- Winning time: 52.0 OR

Medalists
1st place, gold medalist(s)		Betty Cuthbert; Australia
2nd place, silver medalist(s)		Ann Packer; Great Britain
3rd place, bronze medalist(s)		Judy Amoore; Australia

The women's 400 metres was the second-longest of the four women's track races in the Athletics at the 1964 Summer Olympics program in Tokyo. It was held on 15 October, 16 October, and 17 October 1964. 23 athletes from 17 nations entered. The first round was held on 15 October, the semifinals on 16 October, and the final on 17 October. The 1964 Summer Olympics were the first to feature the women's 400 metres.

== Results ==
=== First round ===
The top five runners in each of the 3 heats advanced, as well as the next fastest runner from across the heats.

==== Heat 1 ====
Place	Athlete	Nation	Time (hand)	Time (automatic)
1	Antónia Munkácsi	Hungary	54.4 OR	54.42
2	Tilly van der Made	Netherlands	54.8	54.86
3	Betty Cuthbert	Australia	56.0	–
4	Joy Grieveson	Great Britain	56.8	–
5	Kiyoki Ogawa	Japan	57.6	–
6	Stephie D'Souza	India	58.0	–
7	Erna Maisack	United Team of Germany	58.6	–
8	Ramazangiin Aldaa-nysh	Mongolia	1:00.8	–

==== Heat 2 ====
Place	Athlete	Nation	Time (hand)	Time (automatic)
1	Maria Itkina	Soviet Union	54.9	54.99
2	Margret Buscher	United Team of Germany	55.3	55.32
3	Una Morris	Jamaica	55.3	55.39
4	Maeve Kyle	Ireland	55.4	55.42
5	Janell Smith	United States	55.5	55.56
6	Patricia Kippax	Great Britain	55.5	55.57
7	Abigal Hoffman	Canada	55.9	55.98
8	Samruay Charonggool	Thailand	1:04.0	–

==== Heat 3 ====
Place	Athlete	Nation	Time (hand)	Time (automatic)
1	Ann Packer	Great Britain	53.1 OR	53.18
2	Judy Amoore	Australia	53.8	53.85
3	Evelyne Lebret	France	54.8	–
4	Gertrud Schmidt	United Team of Germany	55.1	–
5	Olga Kazi	Hungary	56.5	–
6	Mary Rajamani	Malaysia	57.8	–
7	Han Myeong-hui	South Korea	58.7	–

=== Semifinals ===
The fastest four runners in each of the two semifinals advanced to the final.

==== Semifinal 1 ====
Place	Athlete	Nation	Time (hand)	Time (automatic)
1	Ann Packer	Great Britain	52.7 OR	52.77
2	Betty Cuthbert	Australia	53.8	–
3	Antónia Munkácsi	Hungary	54.0	–
4	Evelyne Lebret	France	54.5	–
5	Joy Grieveson	Great Britain	54.8	–
6	Una Morris	Jamaica	54.9	–
7	Margret Buscher	United Team of Germany	55.2	–
8	Ogawa Kiyoko	Japan	57.1	–

==== Semifinal 2 ====
Place	Athlete	Nation	Time (hand)	Time (automatic)
1	Judy Amoore	Australia	53.3	53.39
2	Maria Itkina	Soviet Union	53.5	53.50
3	Tilly van der Made	Netherlands	54.1	54.19
4	Gertrud Schmidt	United Team of Germany	54.2	54.27
5	Patricia Kippax	Great Britain	54.4	–
6	Janell Smith	United States	54.5	–
7	Maeve Kyle	Ireland	55.3	–
—	Olga Kazi	Hungary	Did not start	–

=== Final ===
Place	Athlete	Nation	Time (hand)	Time (automatic)
1	Betty Cuthbert	Australia	52.0 OR	52.01
2	Ann Packer	Great Britain	52.2	52.20
3	Judy Amoore	Australia	53.4	–
4	Antónia Munkácsi	Hungary	54.4	–
5	Maria Itkina	Soviet Union	54.6	–
6	Tilly van der Made	Netherlands	55.2	–
7	Gertrud Schmidt	United Team of Germany	55.4	–
8	Evelyne Lebret	France	55.5	–
