= 1962 European Athletics Championships – Women's 400 metres =

Women's 400 metres at the European Athletics Championships
- Venue: JNA Stadium
- Location: Belgrade, Yugoslavia
- Dates: 12 September 1962 (round 1); 13 September 1962 (semi-finals); 14 September 1962 (final)
- Competitors: 18 from 13 nations
- Winning time: 53.4 s WR

Medalists
| gold medal | Mariya Itkina | Soviet Union |
| silver medal | Joy Grieveson | Great Britain |
| bronze medal | Tilly van der Zwaard | Netherlands |

The women's 400 metres at the 1962 European Athletics Championships was held in three rounds at the JNA Stadium in Belgrade, Yugoslavia, on 12, 13, and 14 September 1962. It was the second time that the event was contested at the European Athletics Championships.

Eighteen athletes of thirteen nations competed in round 1, thirteen athletes of nine nations continued in the semi-finals, and six athletes from six nations advanced to the final. That final race was won by Mariya Itkina of the Soviet Union in 53.4 seconds, equalling her own world record, with Joy Grieveson of Great Britain and Tilly van der Zwaard of the Netherlands finishing in second and third place respectively.

== Background ==
Records before the 1962 European Athletics Championships
| Record | Time | Athlete (nation) | Location | Date |
|---|---|---|---|---|
| World record | 53.4 h | Mariya Itkina (URS) | Krasnodar, Soviet Union | 12 September 1959 |
| European record | 53.4 h | Mariya Itkina (URS) | Krasnodar, Soviet Union | 12 September 1959 |
| Championship record | 53.7 h | Mariya Itkina (URS) | Stockholm, Sweden | 21 August 1958 |

== Results ==
=== Round 1 ===
Eighteen athletes from thirteen nations competed in four heats of round 1 on 12 September. The three fastest athletes in each heat qualified (Q) for the semi-finals. In the first heat, Evelyne Lebret of France and Libuše Králíčková of Czechoslovakia didn't qualify for the semi-finals, but they set national records (NR) of 56.2 s and 56.3 s respectively. In the third heat, all four athletes advanced to the semi-finals, because Nadja Simic of Yugoslavia and Pam Piercy of Great Britain tied in third place both finishing in 56.5 s.

Results of the first heat of round 1
| Rank | Name | Nation | Time | Notes |
|---|---|---|---|---|
| 1 | Yekaterina Parlyuk | Soviet Union | 54.9 h | Q |
| 2 | Maeve Kyle | Ireland | 55.1 h | Q |
| 3 | Vera Kummerfeld | West Germany | 55.7 h | Q |
| 4 | Evelyne Lebret | France | 56.2 h | NR |
| 5 | Libuše Králíčková | Czechoslovakia | 56.3 h | NR |

Results of the second heat of round 1
| Rank | Name | Nation | Time | Notes |
|---|---|---|---|---|
| 1 | Joy Grieveson | Great Britain | 54.8 h | Q |
| 2 | Bärbel Reinnagel | East Germany | 55.5 h | Q |
| 3 | Janina Hasse | Poland | 55.7 h | Q |
| 4 | Vera Mukhanova | Soviet Union | 55.8 h | |
| 5 | Tsvetana Isaeva | Bulgaria | 57.1 h | |

Results of the third heat of round 1
| Rank | Name | Nation | Time | Notes |
|---|---|---|---|---|
| 1 | Mariya Itkina | Soviet Union | 54.4 h | Q |
| 2 | Tilly van der Zwaard | Netherlands | 55.4 h | Q |
| 3 | Nadja Simic | Yugoslavia | 56.5 h | Q |
| 3 | Pam Piercy | Great Britain | 56.5 h | Q |

Results of the fourth heat of round 1
| Rank | Name | Nation | Time | Notes |
|---|---|---|---|---|
| 1 | Jean Sorrell | Great Britain | 55.5 h | Q |
| 2 | Helga Henning | West Germany | 55.7 h | Q |
| 3 | Antónia Munkácsi | Hungary | 55.8 h | Q |
| 4 | Delma Savorelli | Italy | 56.9 h | |

=== Semi-finals ===
Thirteen athletes from nine nations competed in two heats of the semi-finals on 13 September. The three fastest athletes in heat qualified for the final (Q). In the first heat, Tilly van der Zwaard of the Netherlands set a national record (NR) of 54.6 s. In the second heat, Joy Grieveson of Great Britain and Helga Henning of West Germany set a national records (NR) of 54.2 s and 54.7 s respectively, both qualifying for the final, and Antónia Munkácsi of Hungary and Nadja Simic of Yugoslavia set national records (NR) of 55.3 s and 56.4 s respectively, but they didn't make it to the next round.

Results of the first heat of the semi-finals
| Rank | Name | Nation | Time | Notes |
|---|---|---|---|---|
| 1 | Mariya Itkina | Soviet Union | 54.3 h | Q |
| 2 | Tilly van der Zwaard | Netherlands | 54.6 h | NR, Q |
| 3 | Maeve Kyle | Ireland | 55.4 h | Q |
| 4 | Bärbel Reinnagel | East Germany | 55.7 h | |
| 5 | Janina Hasse | Poland | 56.1 h | |
| 6 | Pam Piercy | Great Britain | 57.4 h | |

Results of the second heat of the semi-finals
| Rank | Name | Nation | Time | Notes |
|---|---|---|---|---|
| 1 | Joy Grieveson | Great Britain | 54.2 h | NR, Q |
| 2 | Yekaterina Parlyuk | Soviet Union | 54.3 h | Q |
| 3 | Helga Henning | West Germany | 54.7 h | NR, Q |
| 4 | Antónia Munkácsi | Hungary | 55.3 h | NR |
| 5 | Vera Kummerfeld | West Germany | 55.6 h | |
| 6 | Nadja Simic | Yugoslavia | 56.4 h | NR |
| 7 | Jean Sorrell | Great Britain | 56.9 h | |

=== Final ===
Six athletes from six different nations competed in the final on 14 September. The gold medal was won by Mariya Itkina of the Soviet Union who equalled her world record (WR) of 53.4 s, silver went to Joy Grieveson of Great Britain in a national record (NR) of 53.9 s, and bronze to Tilly van der Zwaard of the Netherlands in a national record (NR) of 54.4 s. Outside the medals, Helga Henning of West Germany also set a national record (NR) of 54.6 s.

Results of the final
| Rank | Name | Nation | Time | Notes |
|---|---|---|---|---|
| 1st place, gold medalist(s) | Mariya Itkina | Soviet Union | 53.4 h | =WR |
| 2nd place, silver medalist(s) | Joy Grieveson | Great Britain | 53.9 h | NR |
| 3rd place, bronze medalist(s) | Tilly van der Zwaard | Netherlands | 54.4 h | NR |
| 4 | Helga Henning | West Germany | 54.6 h | NR |
| 5 | Yekaterina Parlyuk | Soviet Union | 54.9 h | |
| 6 | Maeve Kyle | Ireland | 57.5 h | |
