= 1966 European Indoor Games – Women's 400 metres =

The women's 400 metres event at the 1966 European Indoor Games was held on 27 March in Dortmund.

== Medalists ==
Gold	Silver	Bronze
Helga Henning; West Germany	Libuše Macounová; Czechoslovakia	Maeve Kyle; Ireland

== Results ==
=== Heats ===
The first 2 from each heat (Q) qualified directly for the final.

Rank	Heat	Name	Nationality	Time	Notes
1	1	Libuše Macounová	Czechoslovakia	57.1	Q
2	1	Helga Henning	West Germany	57.9	Q
3	1	Maureen Tranter	Great Britain	58.9	
4	1	Évelyne Lebret	France	1:01.0	
1	2	Maeve Kyle	Ireland	56.4	Q
2	2	Christine Linz	West Germany	58.0	Q
3	2	Gisela Ahlemeyer	West Germany	58.0	
4	2	Antónia Munkácsi	Hungary	58.8	
5	2	Annie-Paule Knipping	Belgium	59.6	

=== Final ===
Rank	Name	Nationality	Time	Notes
1st place, gold medalist(s)	Helga Henning	West Germany	56.9	
2nd place, silver medalist(s)	Libuše Macounová	Czechoslovakia	57.2	
3rd place, bronze medalist(s)	Maeve Kyle	Ireland	57.3	
4	Christine Linz	West Germany	57.7	
