= 1968 United States Olympic trials (track and field) =

1968 United States Olympic track and field trials
- Dates: September 6–16
- Host city: Echo Summit, California, U.S.
- Level: Senior
- Type: Outdoor

The men's 1968 United States Olympic trials for track and field were a two-tiered event. Athletes first met for semi-final Olympic trials in Los Angeles, from June 29 to 30. The final trials were held following a training camp at a specially constructed track at Echo Summit, California, between September 6–16. This was called the most bizarre location for an Olympic trials ever, selected to mimic the nearly identical high altitude location for the Olympics in Mexico City in October.

An all-weather polyurethane Tartan track, similar to the Olympic venue, was constructed for the men's trials at Echo Summit, west of South Lake Tahoe. Just off U.S. Route 50, it was built in the summer of 1968 in the parking lot of Nebelhorn ski area, at an elevation of 7,377 feet (2,249 m).

After training at Echo Summit, the race walk trials was held at a similar high altitude location of Alamosa, Colorado, 20 kilometers on September 7, and 50 km on September 10. The process was organized by the AAU, and the athletes invited to the finals were selected based on the qualification at the semi-Olympic trials.

The AccuTrak photographic fully automatic timing system was used at this meet, in anticipation of its implementation at the Olympics. Fully automatic timing became mandatory for world records in 1977. Administrators had not yet figured out what to do with the slower automatic times so the world records at this meet were set using hand times.

The women's Olympic trials were held separately under less elegant, low altitude conditions at Hilmer Lodge Stadium on the Mt. San Antonio College campus in Walnut, California. The pentathlon took place in Columbia, Missouri during the AAU Championships. Both meets took place on August 24 and 25. The tight schedule also made doubling in individual events more difficult. American resident, but Taiwanese citizen Chi Cheng was allowed to participate in the pentathlon, but her dominant performance did not displace the American athletes in the trials.

== Men's results ==
Key: ≠ Athlete without "A" standard, not selected. All events considered to be held at high altitude.

=== Men track events ===
Event	Gold		Silver		Bronze	
100 meters Wind +0.0	Jim Hines	10.0 (10.11)	Charlie Greene	10.1 (10.15)	Mel Pender	10.1 (10.20)
200 meters Wind +1.9	John Carlos	19.7 (19.92) WR	Tommie Smith	20.0 (20.18)	Larry Questad	20.1 (20.28)
400 meters	Lee Evans	44.0 (44.06) WR	Larry James	44.1 (44.19) WR	Ron Freeman	44.6 (44.62)
800 meters	Tom Farrell	1:46.5	Wade Bell	1:47.1	Ron Kutschinski	1:47.8
1500 meters	Jim Ryun	3:49.0	Marty Liquori	3:49.5	Tom von Ruden	3:49.8
5000 meters	Bob Day	14:37.4	Jack Bacheler	14:37.4	Lou Scott	14:53.2
10,000 meters	Tracy Smith	30:00.4	Van Nelson	30:04.0	Tom Laris	30:09.8
110 m hurdles Wind -2.7	Willie Davenport	13.5 (13.72)	Leon Coleman	13.5 (13.77)	Ervin Hall	13.6 (13.84)
400 m hurdles	Geoff Vanderstock	48.8 (48.93) WR	Boyd Gittins	49.1 (49.27)	Ron Whitney	49.2 (49.36)
3000 m s'chase	George Young	8:58.0	Bill Reilly	8:58.8	Conrad Nightingale	9:04.4
20K racewalk	Larry Young	1:35:56.4	Goetz Klopfer	1:37:53.4	Tom Dooley	1:38:03
50K racewalk	Larry Young	4:13:04.4 NR	Bill Weigle	4:20:09.4	Steve Hayden	4:23:22.6
Marathon	George Young	2:30:48	Kenny Moore	2:31:47	Ron Daws	2:33:09

=== Men field events ===
Event	Gold		Silver		Bronze	
High jump	Ed Caruthers	2.21 m (7 ft 3 in)	Reynaldo Brown	2.21 m (7 ft 3 in)	Dick Fosbury	2.21 m (7 ft 3 in)
Pole vault	Bob Seagren	5.41 m (17 ft 8 3/4 in) WR	John Pennel	5.18 m (16 ft 11 3/4 in)	Casey Carrigan	5.18 m (16 ft 11 3/4 in)
Long jump	Bob Beamon	8.39 m (27 ft 6 1/4 in)w +3.2	Ralph Boston	8.26 m (27 ft 1 in)w +5.0	Charles Mays	8.16 m (26 ft 9 1/4 in)w +4.0
Triple jump	Art Walker	16.81 m (55 ft 1 3/4 in) +1.2 NR	Dave Smith	16.38 m (53 ft 8 3/4 in)	Norm Tate	16.14 m (52 ft 11 1/4 in)
Shot put	George Woods	20.73 m (68 ft 0 in)	Dave Maggard	20.53 m (67 ft 4 1/4 in)	Randy Matson	20.45 m (67 ft 1 in)
Discus throw	Jay Silvester	63.25 m (207 ft 6 in)	Gary Carlsen	62.54 m (205 ft 2 in)	Al Oerter	62.39 m (204 ft 8 in)
Hammer throw	Ed Burke	68.96 m (226 ft 2 in)	Albert Hall	67.18 m (220 ft 4 in)	Hal Connolly	65.13 m (213 ft 8 in)
Javelin throw	Mark Murro	82.46 m (270 ft 6 in)	Frank Covelli	81.66 m (267 ft 10 in)	Gary Stenlund	81.62 m (267 ft 9 in)
Decathlon	Bill Toomey	8222	Rick Sloan	7800	Tom Waddell	7706

== Women's results ==
=== Women track events ===
Event	Gold		Silver		Bronze	
100 meters Wind +1.9	Wyomia Tyus	11.3	Margaret Bailes	11.3	Barbara Ferrell	11.4
200 meters Wind +0.1	Margaret Bailes	23.5	Wyomia Tyus	23.7	Barbara Ferrell	23.7
400 meters	Jarvis Scott	53.5	Lois Drinkwater	54.0	Esther Stroy	54.3
800 meters	Madeline Manning	2:03.0	Doris Brown	2:03.0	Jarvis Scott	2:04.5
80 m hurdles Wind +0.1	Mamie Rallins	11.1	Patty van Wolvelaere	11.2	Janene Jaton	11.2

=== Women field events ===
Event	Gold		Silver		Bronze	
High jump	Sharon Callahan	5 ft 7 1/4 in (1.7 m)	Eleanor Montgomery	5 ft 7 1/4 in (1.7 m)	Estelle Baskerville	5 ft 6 in (1.67 m)
Long jump	Martha Watson	6.42 m (21 ft 3/4 in)	Willye White	6.40 m (20 ft 11 3/4 in)	Barbara Emerson	5.77 m (18 ft 11 in)
Shot put	Maren Seidler	15.28 m (50 ft 1 1/2 in)	Lynn Graham	14.03 m (46 ft 1/4 in)	Sharon Shepherd	13.89 m (45 ft 6 3/4 in)
Discus throw	Olga Connolly	53.35 m (175 ft 0 in)	Carol Moseke	50.72 m (166 ft 4 in)	Nancy Norberg	46.50 m (152 ft 6 in)
Javelin throw	Barbara Friedrich	54.08 m (177 ft 5 in)	Sherry Calvert	48.95 m (160 ft 7 in)	RaNae Bair	48.16 m (158 ft 0 in)
Pentathlon	Chi Cheng Taiwan; Pat Winslow	4823; 4481	Barbara Emerson	4327	Janis Glotzer	4319
