= 1966 European Athletics Championships – Women's 400 metres =

Women's 400 metres at the European Athletics Championships
- Venue: Népstadion
- Location: Budapest, Hungary
- Dates: 30 and 31 August, and 1 September 1966
- Competitors: 30 from 16 nations
- Winning time: 52.9 s CR NR

Medalists
gold medal	Anna Chmelková	Czechoslovakia
silver medal	Antónia Munkácsi	Hungary
bronze medal	Monique Noirot	France

The women's 400 metres at the 1966 European Athletics Championships was held in Budapest, Hungary, at Népstadion on 30 and 31 August, and 1 September 1966.

== Results ==
=== Heats ===
30 August

==== Heat 1 ====
Rank	Name	Nationality	Time	Notes
1	Paola Pigni	Italy	54.8	Q
2	Karin Wallgren	Sweden	55.3	Q
3	Grażyna Chodorek	Poland	55.7	Q
4	Ljiljana Petnjarić	Yugoslavia	55.8	
5	Lilita Zāģere	Soviet Union	56.3	
6	Adile Dani	Albania	59.3	NR

==== Heat 2 ====
Rank	Name	Nationality	Time	Notes
1	Anna Chmelková	Czechoslovakia	53.6	NR Q
2	Lia Louer	Netherlands	54.5	Q
3	Deidre Watkinson	Great Britain	54.9	Q
4	Sára Szenteleki	Hungary	54.9	
5	Maeve Kyle	Ireland	55.4	
6	Brigitte Flach	East Germany	56.0	

==== Heat 3 ====
Rank	Name	Nationality	Time	Notes
1	Zsuzsa Szabó	Hungary	54.6	Q
2	Stans Brehm	Netherlands	54.9	Q
3	Tove Bakkejord	Norway	55.1	Q
4	Natalya Runova	Soviet Union	55.2	
5	Ika Maričić	Yugoslavia	55.2	
6	Francine Peyskens	Belgium	57.6	NR

==== Heat 4 ====
Rank	Name	Nationality	Time	Notes
1	Rosemary Stirling	Great Britain	54.2	Q
2	Berit Berthelsen	Norway	54.4	Q
3	Hilda Slaman	Netherlands	54.7	Q
4	Évelyne Lebret	France	55.0	
5	Libuše Macounová	Czechoslovakia	55.4	
6	Donata Govoni	Italy	55.9	

==== Heat 5 ====
Rank	Name	Nationality	Time	Notes
1	Antónia Munkácsi	Hungary	54.0	Q
2	Monique Noirot	France	54.4	Q
3	Helga Henning	West Germany	54.5	Q
4	Lyudmila Samotyosova	Soviet Union	54.6	Q
5	Libuše Eichlerová	Czechoslovakia	55.3	
6	Celina Gerwin	Poland	55.9	

=== Semi-finals ===
31 August

==== Semi-final 1 ====
Rank	Name	Nationality	Time	Notes
1	Zsuzsa Szabó	Hungary	54.0	Q
2	Anna Chmelková	Czechoslovakia	54.0	Q
3	Berit Berthelsen	Norway	54.2	NR Q
4	Lia Louer	Netherlands	54.4	Q
5	Karin Wallgren	Sweden	54.5	NR
6	Hilda Slaman	Netherlands	54.8	
7	Deidre Watkinson	Great Britain	55.7	
8	Grażyna Chodorek	Poland	56.8	

==== Semi-final 2 ====
Rank	Name	Nationality	Time	Notes
1	Antónia Munkácsi	Hungary	53.9	Q
2	Monique Noirot	France	54.0	Q
3	Helga Henning	West Germany	54.2	Q
4	Lyudmila Samotyosova	Soviet Union	54.2	Q
5	Rosemary Stirling	Great Britain	54.5	
6	Stans Brehm	Netherlands	54.9	
7	Tove Bakkejord	Norway	55.4	
8	Paola Pigni	Italy	55.6	

=== Final ===
1 September

Rank	Name	Nationality	Time	Notes
1st place, gold medalist(s)	Anna Chmelková	Czechoslovakia	52.9	CR NR
2nd place, silver medalist(s)	Antónia Munkácsi	Hungary	53.9	
3rd place, bronze medalist(s)	Monique Noirot	France	54.0	
4	Lyudmila Samotyosova	Soviet Union	54.0	
5	Helga Henning	West Germany	54.1	NR
6	Berit Berthelsen	Norway	54.1	NR
7	Zsuzsa Szabó	Hungary	54.3	
8	Lia Louer	Netherlands	55.0	
