= Gertrud Schmidt =

German sprinter

Personal information
- Nationality: German
- Born: 18 July 1942 (age 83) Ozorków, Germany
- Height: 162 cm (5 ft 4 in)
- Weight: 58 kg (128 lb)

Sport
- Sport: Athletics
- Event: Sprinting / 400 metres
- Club: Schweriner SC, Schwerin

Gertrud Schmidt (born 18 July 1942) is a German retired sprinter who competed at the 1964 Summer Olympics.

== Biography ==
At the 1964 Olympic Games in Tokyo, she represented the United Team of Germany in the women's 400 metres.

Schmidt finished second behind Joy Grieveson in the 440 yards event at the 1965 WAAA Championships.
