= Stephen Boyle =

Australian rules footballer (born 1953)

Personal information
- Born: 4 September 1953 (age 73)
- Original team: Moe
- Height: 178 cm (5 ft 10 in)
- Weight: 71 kg (157 lb)

Playing career^{1}
Years	Club	Games (Goals)
1972	Footscray	6 (10)
- ^{1} Playing statistics correct to the end of 1972.

Stephen Boyle (born 4 September 1953) is a former Australian rules footballer who played with Footscray in the Victorian Football League (VFL).

Recruited from Moe, Boyle was a half forward flanker who kicked at least one goal in each of his six appearances for Footscray in the 1972 VFL season. Just a week after the infamous John Greening incident had taken place, Boyle also suffered a career-ending injury. Playing his sixth league game, against St Kilda at Western Oval, he badly injured an eye after a collision with defender Kevin "Cowboy Neale. He was admitted to hospital with bleeding behind his eye and needed surgery to stop blood from reaching his brain. Doctors were unable to prevent him from permanently losing the sight of his right eye and although he attempted a comeback he never played another VFL game.

He was the second of three family members who had their sporting careers ruined by injury. His mother, Nancy Boyle, was a short-distance runner and briefly held the 440 yard world record in 1957. She missed out on qualifying for the 1960 Rome Olympics when she stepped on a nail. He also has a son, Tim Boyle, who played for Hawthorn but was forced into retirement at the age of 25, due to multiple injuries.
