= Nancy Boyle =

Australian sprinter

Personal information
- Born: 2 February 1932
- Died: 10 January 2024 (aged 91)

Sport
- Sport: Running
- Event: 400 meters

Nancy Irene Boyle (née Cottrill, 2 February 1932 – 10 January 2024) was an Australian sprinter who was the holder of the women's 400m world record.

== Career ==
Boyle achieved the women's world record for 400m on 24 February 1957 of 56.3 s in Sydney in a 440 yards race.

Boyle placed fourth in the 220 yards event in 1956, 1958 and 1960, and fourth in the 100 yards event in 1956 at the Australian Track and Field Championships.

== Personal life ==
Boyle is the mother of the Australian rules football player Stephen Boyle and the grandmother of the Australian rules football player Tim Boyle.
