= 1968 European Indoor Games – Women's 400 metres =

The women's 400 metres event at the 1968 European Indoor Games was held on 9 March in Madrid.

== Medalists ==
Gold	Silver	Bronze
Natalya Chistyakova; Soviet Union	Gisela Ahlemeyer; West Germany	Tatyana Arnautova; Soviet Union

== Results ==
=== Heats ===
First 2 from each heat (Q) qualified directly for the final.

Rank	Heat	Name	Nationality	Time	Notes
1	1	Gisela Ahlemeyer	West Germany	56.38	Q
2	1	Tatyana Arnautova	Soviet Union	56.4	Q
3	1	Rita Kühne	East Germany	57.3	
1	2	Natalya Chistyakova	Soviet Union	55.87	Q
2	2	Ika Maričić	Yugoslavia	56.4	Q
3	2	Libuše Macounová	Czechoslovakia	56.7	
4	2	Josefina Salgado	Spain	58.1	

=== Final ===
Rank	Lane	Name	Nationality	Time	Notes
1st place, gold medalist(s)	3	Natalya Chistyakova	Soviet Union	55.24	WB
2nd place, silver medalist(s)	2	Gisela Ahlemeyer	West Germany	56.2	
3rd place, bronze medalist(s)	1	Tatyana Arnautova	Soviet Union	56.3	
4	4	Ika Maričić	Yugoslavia	56.5	
