= Tim Boyle =

Tim Boyle may refer to:

- Tim Boyle (Australian footballer) (born 1984), Australian rules footballer
- Tim Boyle (American football) (born 1994), American football quarterback
- Tim Boyle (businessman) (born 1949), American billionaire businessman
