= Slaman =

Slaman is a surname. Notable people with the surname include:

- Hilde Slaman (born 1943), Dutch sprinter and middle-distance runner
- Theodore Slaman, professor of mathematics at UC Berkeley
