= Women's 400 metres world record progression =

The first world record in the 400 m for women (athletics) was recognized by the International Amateur Athletics Federation, now known as the World Athletics, in 1957.

To June 21, 2009, the IAAF has ratified 27 world records in the event. Their 2009 record progression list, however, lists 26 records.

== Indoor ==
Indoor records are run over two laps of a shorter 200 metres track. "y" indicates marks were set over the 440 yards (402.34 m) imperial distance, and an asterisk indicates a record was repeated. All records since Kratochvílová's 49.59 in 1982 were ratified by the IAAF.

Women's indoor 400 metres world record progression
| Time | Athlete | Nationality | Location of race | Date |
Manual timing
| 59.2 | Nadezhda Smirnova | Soviet Union | Leningrad, Soviet Union | 17 March 1951 |
| 58.6 | Polina Solopova | Soviet Union | Leningrad, Soviet Union | 1 March 1953 |
| 58.1 | Helga Henning | West Germany | Stuttgart, West Germany | 11 March 1961 |
| 56.5* | Margarete Buscher | West Germany | West Berlin | 9 March 1963 |
| 56.5 | Helga Henning | West Germany | West Berlin | 9 March 1963 |
| 55.8y | Judith Pollock | Australia | San Francisco, United States | 9 January 1965 |
| 55.6y | Judith Pollock | Australia | Boston, United States | 16 January 1965 |
| 55.6y | Judith Pollock | Australia | New York City, United States | 28 January 1965 |
| 54.0 | Janell Smith | United States | West Berlin | 7 April 1965 |
| 54.0* | Colette Besson | France | Belgrade, Yugoslavia | 8 March 1969 |
Automatic timing
| 55.29 | Natalia Pechonkina | Soviet Union | Madrid, Spain | 9 March 1968 |
| 53.01 | Marylin Neufville | Jamaica | Vienna, Austria | 14 March 1970 |
| 52.44 | Nadezhda Ilyina | Soviet Union | Gothenburg, Sweden | 10 March 1974 |
| 52.28 | Rita Wilden | West Germany | Dortmund, West Germany | 7 February 1976 |
| 52.26 | Rita Wilden | West Germany | Munich, West Germany | 22 February 1976 |
| 51.80 | Marita Koch | East Germany | Milan, Italy | 24 February 1977 |
| 51.57 | Marita Koch | East Germany | Milan, Italy | 24 February 1977 |
| 51.14 | Marita Koch | East Germany | San Sebastián, Spain | 13 March 1977 |
| 49.64 | Jarmila Kratochvílová | Czechoslovakia | Vienna, Austria | 28 January 1981 |
| 49.59 | Jarmila Kratochvílová | Czechoslovakia | Milan, Italy | 7 March 1982 |
| 49.26 | Femke Bol | Netherlands | Apeldoorn, Netherlands | 19 February 2023 |
| 49.24 | Femke Bol | Netherlands | Apeldoorn, Netherlands | 18 February 2024 |
| 49.17 | Femke Bol | Netherlands | Glasgow, United Kingdom | 2 March 2024 |

== Outdoor ==
=== Record progression 1957–1974 ===
| Time | Auto | Athlete | Nationality | Location of race | Date |
|---|---|---|---|---|---|
| 57.0y | | Marlene Mathews | Australia | Sydney, Australia | 6 January 1957 |
| 57.0y | | Marise Chamberlain | New Zealand | Christchurch, New Zealand | 16 February 1957 |
| 56.3y | | Nancy Boyle | Australia | Sydney, Australia | 24 February 1957 |
| 55.2 | | Polina Lazareva | Soviet Union | Moscow, Soviet Union | 10 May 1957 |
| 54.0 | | Mariya Itkina | Soviet Union | Minsk, Soviet Union | 8 June 1957 |
| 53.6 | | Mariya Itkina | Soviet Union | Moscow, Soviet Union | 6 July 1957 |
| 53.4+ | | Mariya Itkina | Soviet Union | Krasnodar, Soviet Union | 12 September 1959 |
| 53.4 | | Mariya Itkina | Soviet Union | Belgrade, Yugoslavia | 14 September 1962 |
| 51.9 | | Shin Geum-Dan | North Korea | Pyongyang, North Korea | 23 October 1962 |
| 51.7 | 51.72 | Nicole Duclos | France | Athens, Greece | 18 September 1969 |
| 51.7 | 51.74 | Colette Besson | France | Athens, Greece | 18 September 1969 |
| 51.0 | 51.02 | Marilyn Neufville | Jamaica | Edinburgh, United Kingdom | 23 July 1970 |
| 51.0 | 51.08 | Monika Zehrt | East Germany | Paris, France | 4 July 1972 |
| 49.9 | | Irena Szewińska | Poland | Warsaw, Poland | 22 June 1974 |

(y) indicates time for 440 yards (402.34 metres), ratified as a record for this event
(+) plus sign denotes en route time during longer race

The "Time" column indicates the ratified mark; the "Auto" column indicates a fully automatic time that was also recorded in the event when hand-timed marks were used for official records, or which was the basis for the official mark, rounded to the 10th of a second, depending on the rules then in place.

=== Record progression from 1975 ===
From 1975, the IAAF accepted separate automatically electronically timed records for events up to 400 metres. Starting January 1, 1977, the IAAF required fully automatic timing to the hundredth of a second for these events.

Riitta Salin's 50.14 from 1974 was the fastest recorded result to that time.

| Time | Athlete | Nationality | Location of race | Date | Duration of record |
|---|---|---|---|---|---|
| 50.14 | Riitta Salin | Finland | Rome, Italy | 4 September 1974 | 1 year, 8 months and 5 days |
| 49.77 | Christina Brehmer | East Germany | Dresden, East Germany | 9 May 1976 | 1 month and 13 days |
| 49.75 | Irena Szewińska | Poland | Bydgoszcz, Poland | 22 June 1976 | 1 month and 7 days |
| 49.29 | Irena Szewińska | Poland | Montreal, Canada | 29 July 1976 | 1 year, 11 months and 3 days |
| 49.19 | Marita Koch | East Germany | Leipzig, East Germany | 2 July 1978 | 1 month and 17 days |
| 49.03 | Marita Koch | East Germany | Potsdam, East Germany | 19 August 1978 | 12 days |
| 48.94 | Marita Koch | East Germany | Prague, Czechoslovakia | 31 August 1978 | 10 months and 29 days |
| 48.89 | Marita Koch | East Germany | Potsdam, East Germany | 29 July 1979 | 6 days |
| 48.60 | Marita Koch | East Germany | Turin, Italy | 4 August 1979 | 3 years, 1 month and 4 days |
| 48.16 | Marita Koch | East Germany | Athens, Greece | 8 September 1982 | 11 months and 2 days |
| 47.99 | Jarmila Kratochvílová | Czechoslovakia | Helsinki, Finland | 10 August 1983 | 2 years, 1 month and 26 days |
| 47.60* | Marita Koch | East Germany | Canberra, Australia | 6 October 1985 | 40 years, 7 months and 7 days |

*Koch's record of 47.60 still stands as the fastest 400m ever run by a woman, although this is controversial. As Yahoo! Sports summarized in 2025, leaked documents from East Germany "specified dosages and dates for Koch's alleged use of the steroid Oral-Turinabol. Despite that, Koch has denied using performance-enhancing drugs, telling the BBC in 2014 that she has 'a clear conscience.' ... Track and field's governing body can't remove Koch's record because she never tested positive for banned substances and because the World Anti-Doping Association's 10-year statute of limitations has long expired." Had Koch's record previously been removed or if she were to admit to using PEDs, which would allow for the record to be retroactively revoked, the new record in the women's 400m would be held by American Sydney McLaughlin-Levrone, a former hurdler, who recorded a 47.78 on 18 September 2025 at the World Athletics Championship in Tokyo.
