= Noirot =

Noirot (English: /nwɑːˈroʊ/, French: [nwaʁo]) is a French surname. Notable people with the surname include:

- Louis Noirot (1820–1902), French painter and lithographer
- Émile Noirot, (1853–1924), French painter, son of Louis Noirot
- Benjamin Noirot (born 1980), French rugby union player
- Ernest Noirot (1851–1913), French actor, photographer, explorer and colonial administrator
- Monique Noirot (born 1941), French sprinter
- Olivier Noirot (born 1969), French sprinter
