= 400 metres world record progression =

400 metres world record progression may refer to:

- Men's 400 metres world record progression
- Women's 400 metres world record progression
