= Anne Covell =

Canadian sprinter (1950–2020)

Personal information
- Nationality: Canadian
- Born: 9 August 1950 Delta, British Columbia
- Died: 3 November 2020 (aged 70)

Sport
- Sport: Sprinting
- Event: 400 metres

Anne Covell (9 August 1950 – 3 November 2020) was a Canadian sprinter. She competed in the women's 400 metres at the 1968 Summer Olympics.
