= Diny Hobers =

Dutch high jumper

Personal information
- Nationality: Dutch
- Born: 10 December 1932 (age 93) Nieuw-Amsterdam, Drenthe, Netherlands
- Height: 1.76 m (5 ft 9 in)
- Weight: 72 kg (159 lb)

Sport
- Sport: Athletics
- Event: High jump / shot put
- Club: PSV, Eindhoven

Egberdiena "Diny" Hobers (born 10 December 1932) is a retired Dutch high jumper who competed at the 1960 Summer Olympics.

== Biography ==
Hobers finished second behind Suzanne Allday in the shot put event at the British 1959 WAAA Championships.

At the 1960 Olympic Games in Rome, she represented the Netherlands in the high jump competition and finished in equal 16th place.

Awards
Preceded by Hannie Bloemhof	KNAU Cup; 1958	Succeeded by Gerda Kraan
Preceded by Hannie Bloemhof	KNAU Cup; 1958	Succeeded by Eef Kamerbeek as Herman van Leeuwen Cup
