= Dutch Athlete of the Year =

Athletics award in the Netherlands

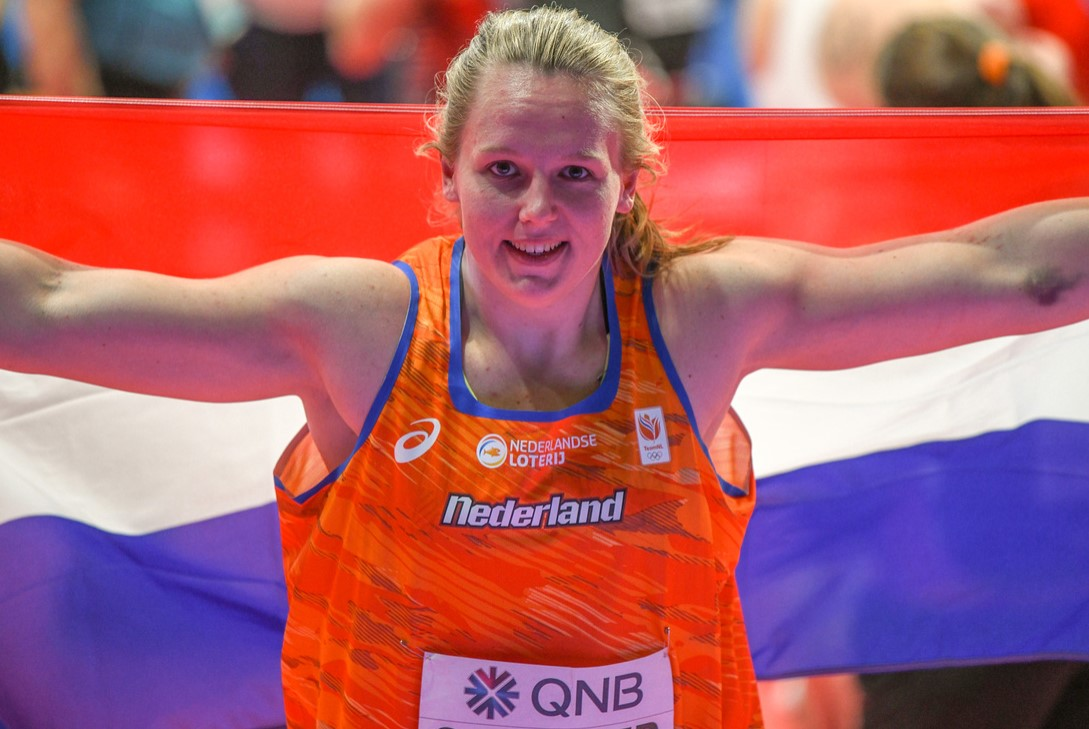
Shot-putter Jessica Schilder was Dutch Athlete of the Year for the first time in 2025.

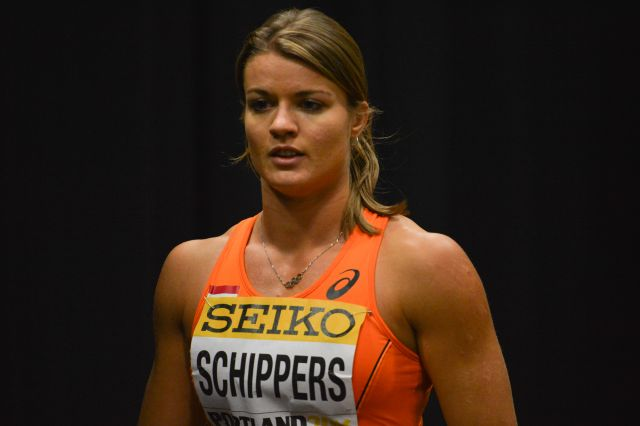
Sprinter and heptathlete Dafne Schippers won from 2011 to 2017, more times than any other athlete.

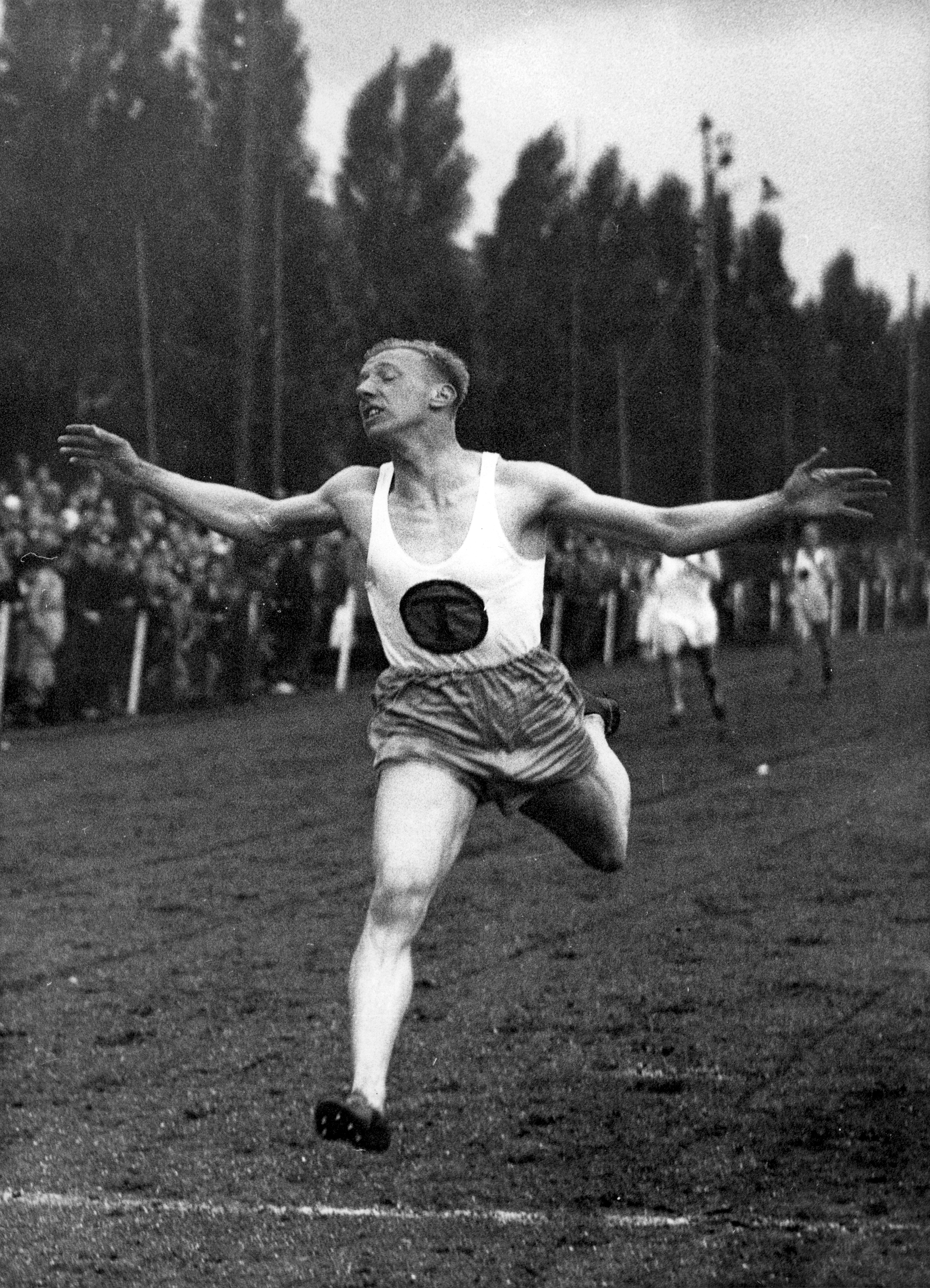
Sprinter Tinus Osendarp was the first winner for 1935, when it was called the Sauer Cup.

The Dutch Athlete of the Year (Dutch: atleet van het jaar) is an annual award given to the most distinguished competitor in the sport of athletics from the Netherlands by the Royal Dutch Athletics Federation (KNAU). A shortlist is drawn up by a group of federation officials and sports journalists and then goes to a vote to the public. The award is presented at the annual end-of-year gala of the federation.

The award for 1935 was inaugurated in 1936 as the Sauer Cup (Dutch: Sauer-beker). It was renamed to the KNAU Cup in 1947, as the eponymous Sauer had collaborated with the Nazis during World War II. Initially a mixed-gender award, the best Dutch male and female athletes were recognised separately from 1959 onwards. The men's award was called the Herman van Leeuwen Cup during this period, while the women's award continued as the KNAU Cup. Since 2005, the awards have been known as the Dutch Athlete of the Year, and since 2018, it is again a mixed-gender award.

Junior athletes also gained recognition separately through the mixed-gender Albert Spree Cup (Dutch: Albert Spree-beker), first awarded in 1951. From 1959, male and female juniors were recognised separately; junior female athletes gained recognition through the Fanny Blankers-Koen Plaquette, while the award for junior male athletes continued as the Albert Spree Cup. These were replaced in 2006 by a mixed-gender junior award known as the Talent of the Year. Since 2018, this award has been merged with the Dutch Athlete of the Year award. In the years between 2011 and 2018, a separate award for para-athletes also existed.

== List of winners ==
=== 1935–1946 ===
Sauer Cup (Note: The Sauer Cup was awarded in March for performances in the previous year. In this table the year of those performances is listed.)
Year	Athlete	Ref.
1935	Tinus Osendarp	
1936	Wil van Beveren	
1937	Fanny Koen (1/3)	
1938	Nel van Balen Blanken	
1939	Jan Brasser	
1940	Fanny Blankers-Koen (2/3)	
1941	Wim Peters	
1942	Chris Berger	
1943	Fanny Blankers-Koen (3/3)	
1944	not awarded (Note: There were famine and fighting in the Netherlands during the last two years of World War II. In addition, there were athletics equipment shortages at the time.)	
1945	not awarded	
1946	Women's relay team (Note: The women's 4 × 100 m relay team members were Fanny Blankers-Koen, Martha Adema, Nettie Timmer, and Gerda Koudijs.)	

=== 1947–1958 ===
KNAU Cup (Note: The KNAU Cup was awarded in March or April for performances in the previous year. In this table the year of those performances is listed.)
Year	Athlete	Ref.
1947	Jef Lataster	
1948	Frits de Ruijter	
1949	Joop Overdijk	
1950	Wim Slijkhuis	
1951	Nico Lutkeveld	
1952	Puck Brouwer	
1953	Wil Lust	
1954	Janus van der Zande	
1955	Cor Aafjes	
1956	Frans Künen	
1957	Hannie Bloemhof	
1958	Dini Hobers	

=== 1959–2004 ===
Herman van Leeuwen Cup and KNAU Cup (Note: The Herman van Leeuwen Cup and the KNAU Cup were awarded in January–April for performances in the previous year. In this table the year of the performances is listed.)
Year	Men	Women	Ref.
1959	Eef Kamerbeek (1/2)	Gerda Kraan (1/3)	
1960	Eef Kamerbeek (2/2)	Joke Bijleveld	
1961	Cees Koch (1/2)	Gerda Kraan (2/3)	
1962	Cees Koch (2/2)	Gerda Kraan (3/3)	
1963	Henk Evers	Lia Hinten	
1964	Frans Luitjes	Tilly van der Made	
1965	Fred van Herpen	Ilja Laman (1/3) & Hilde Slaman	
1966	Leo de Winter	Corrie Bakker	
1967	Piet Olofsen	Mia Gommers (1/2)	
1968	Ed de Noorlander	Mia Gommers (2/2)	
1969	Ben Lesterhuis	Wilma van den Berg	
1970	Bram Wassenaar	Ilja Keizer-Laman (2/3)	
1971	Egbert Nijstad	Els van Noorduyn	
1972	Jos Hermens (1/3)	Ilja Keizer-Laman (3/3)	
1973	Haico Scharn	Mieke van Wissen-Sterk	
1974	Jos Hermens (2/3)	Ciska Janssen-Jansen	
1975	Jos Hermens (3/3)	Mieke van Doorn	
1976	Ruud Wielart (1/2)	Ria Stalman (1/3)	
1977	Ruud Wielart (2/2)	Mirjam van Laar	
1978	Gerard Tebroke	Sylvia Barlag (1/3)	
1979	Harry Schulting	Sylvia Barlag (2/3)	
1980	Gerard Nijboer (1/2)	Sylvia Barlag (3/3)	
1981	Hans Koeleman	Els Vader	
1982	Gerard Nijboer (2/2)	Carla Beurskens (1/2)	
1983	Rob Druppers (1/2)	Ria Stalman (2/3)	
1984	Erik de Bruin (1/3)	Ria Stalman (3/3)	
1985	Rob Druppers (2/2)	Carla Beurskens (2/2)	
1986	Han Kulker (1/2)	Nelli Cooman (1/2)	
1987	Han Kulker (2/2)	Elly van Hulst (1/3)	
1988	Robert de Wit (1/2)	Elly van Hulst (2/3)	
1989	Emiel Mellaard	Elly van Hulst (3/3)	
1990	Erik de Bruin (2/3)	Ellen van Langen (1/2)	
1991	Erik de Bruin (3/3)	Letitia Vriesde (1/2)	
1992	Robert de Wit (2/2)	Ellen van Langen (2/2)	
1993	Bert van Vlaanderen (1/3)	not awarded	
1994	Bert van Vlaanderen (2/3)	Nelli Fiere-Cooman (2/2)	
1995	Bert van Vlaanderen (3/3)	Sharon Jaklofsky (1/2)	
1996	Marko Koers (1/2)	Sharon Jaklofsky (2/2)	
1997	Marko Koers (2/2)	Corrie de Bruin (1/2)	
1998	Robin Korving	Corrie de Bruin (2/2)	
1999	Kamiel Maase (1/3)	Lieja Koeman (1/2)	
2000	Simon Vroemen (1/2)	Lieja Koeman (2/2)	
2001	Kamiel Maase (2/3)	Letitia Vriesde (2/2)	
2002	Simon Vroemen (2/2)	Jacqueline Poelman	
2003	Kamiel Maase (3/3)	Lornah Kiplagat (1/4)	
2004	Chiel Warners	Karin Ruckstuhl (1/2)	

=== 2005–present ===
Athlete of the Year (Note: The Athlete of the Year was awarded in November or December for performances in that year or in January or February for performances in the previous year. In this table the year of the performances is listed.)
Year	Men	Women	Ref.
2005	Rens Blom	Lornah Kiplagat (2/4)	
2006	Bram Som	Karin Ruckstuhl (2/2)	
2007	Rutger Smith (1/2)	Lornah Kiplagat (3/4)	
2008	Rutger Smith (2/2)	Lornah Kiplagat (4/4)	
2009	Martijn Nuijens	Jolanda Keizer	
2010	Eelco Sintnicolaas (1/3)	Yvonne Hak	
2011	Eelco Sintnicolaas (2/3)	Dafne Schippers (1/7)	
2012	Churandy Martina (1/2)	Dafne Schippers (2/7)	
2013	Ignisious Gaisah	Dafne Schippers (3/7)	
2014	Eelco Sintnicolaas (3/3)	Dafne Schippers (4/7)	
2015	Liemarvin Bonevacia	Dafne Schippers (5/7)	
2016	Churandy Martina (2/2)	Dafne Schippers (6/7)	
2017	Menno Vloon	Dafne Schippers (7/7)	
2018	Sifan Hassan (1/4)		
2019	Sifan Hassan (2/4)		
2020	not awarded (Note: Not awarded due to the COVID-19 pandemic)		
2021	Sifan Hassan (3/4)		
2022	Femke Bol (1/2)		
2023	Femke Bol (2/2)		
2024	Sifan Hassan (4/4)		
2025	Jessica Schilder		
