= Ramazangiin Aldaa-nysh =

Mongolian sprinter (born 1945)

Personal information
- Nationality: Mongolian
- Born: 23 November 1945 (age 79)

Sport
- Sport: Sprinting
- Event: 400 metres

Ramazangiin Aldaa-nysh (born 23 November 1945) is a Mongolian sprinter. She competed in the women's 400 metres at the 1964 Summer Olympics.
