= Erna Maisack =

German sprinter

Personal information
- Nationality: German
- Born: 13 October 1941 (age 84) Plaidt

Sport
- Sport: Sprinting
- Event: 400 metres

Erna Maisack (born 13 October 1941) is a German sprinter. She competed in the women's 400 metres at the 1964 Summer Olympics.
