= Stan Watson (footballer) =

English footballer (1937–2014)

Personal information
- Full name: Stanley Watson
- Date of birth: 17 March 1937
- Place of birth: Darlington, England
- Date of death: 16 January 2014 (aged 76)
- Place of death: Darlington, England
- Positions: Wing half; centre half

Senior career*
Years	Team	Apps	(Gls)
1957–1959	Darlington	27	(0)
- * Club domestic league appearances and goals

Stanley Watson (17 March 1937 – 16 January 2014) was an English footballer who made 27 appearances in the Football League playing as a wing half or centre half for Darlington in the 1950s. He made his debut playing at centre half on 8 February 1958 away to Workington, in a team weakened when heavy snow prevented some players from reaching the ground.

Watson was married to British 400m runner Joy Grieveson.
