= Jarvis Scott =

American sprinter

Jarvis Lavonne Scott
Personal information
- Nationality: American
- Born: April 6, 1947 Waco, Texas, U.S.
- Died: September 29, 2017 (aged 70) Lubbock, Texas, U.S.

Sport
- Sport: Sprinting
- Event: 400 metres

Jarvis Lavonne Scott (born April 6, 1947 – September 29, 2017) was an American sprinter. She competed in the women's 400 metres at the 1968 Summer Olympics. She qualified by winning the 1968 Olympic Trials. She also finished third in the 800 meters behind eventual gold medalist Madeline Manning but declined her position in that event allowing Francie Kraker to run. She is the first American woman and the last American to qualify for the Olympics in both the 400 and 800.

== Biography ==
Scott was the first American woman to reach the finals of the 400 meters. In the final, she burst into the lead, making up the stagger on eventual winner Colette Besson and taking a clear lead down the backstretch. She held the lead onto the homestretch before being overtaken by eventual silver medalist Lillian Board on the inside. After the fast beginning of the race, she was unable to respond to the sprint finishes of the other competitors and finished in sixth.

Running for the Los Angeles Mercurettes, she won the National Championship in the 400 meters that year. At the time she was working for an insurance underwriter and attending Los Angeles City College at night. She also won the National Indoor Championships twice, first in 1969 after the Olympics and again in 1971. While running for California State University, Los Angeles she won the 1975 AIAW National Championship. She was also part of the CSU, LA winning sprint medley relay team in 1973.

The eldest of six children, Scott originally moved to the Los Angeles area as a 9 year old, starting her track career while a student at Pomona High School but the state and school had no track program for girls at the time. She also played basketball and threw the javelin. After graduating, she took up coaching at Texas Tech and remained a resident of Lubbock, Texas. She suffered a stroke in 2004. She was voted “Most Outstanding Young Woman of America” in 1980 and is a member of the CSU, LA Hall of Fame.
