= Anna Chmelková =

Medal record

Women's athletics

Representing Czechoslovakia

European Championships
| Gold medal – first place | 1966 Budapest | 400 m |

Anna Chmelková, née Anna Blanáriková, (26 July 1944) is a Slovak former track and field sprinter who competed for Czechoslovakia in the 400 metres. She was the first Slovak to win a European gold medal in athletics, doing so at the 1966 European Athletics Championships. She also represented Czechoslovakia at the 1968 Mexico City Olympics.

Chmelková was a four-time Czechoslovak national champion and improved the national record several times. Her personal best of 52.9 seconds was achieved while winning her European title.

== Career ==
Born in Špačince, now in the Trnava Region of Slovakia, she took up athletics around 1959, working with coaches Karl Sidley and Jozefa Manu in Bratislava. She was trained by Pavol Glesk in the mid-1960s and it was during this period that she rose to the national level. She achieved her first Czechoslovak national record in 1963, setting a time of 56.2 seconds in a still-developing national scene. Running under her maiden name, she claimed the 400 m title at the 1964 Czechoslovak Athletics Championships in a time of 55.0 seconds. This marked a big improvement in time compared to past winners. This ranked her in the top 25 globally that year.

Chmelkova was part of an emergent women's track team under Pavol Glesk, with three other athletes becoming national standouts: Eva Glesková (later a 100 m world record holder), Eva Šuranová (a 1972 Olympic medalist) and Jozefína Čerchlanová (a 1976 Olympian). The group were part of the athletics section of the Slovan Bratislava sports club, led by Jan Koštial. Chmelková also got married during this period, to fellow national athlete Vladimir Chmelkov (a triple jumper).

The 1966 season proved to be the best of her career. She set a championship record of 54.3 seconds to win her second national title in the 400 m. Her focus for the season was the 1966 European Athletics Championships, held in Budapest. In the first round she set a new national record of 53.6 seconds – the first time a Czechoslovak woman had run the 400 m under 54 seconds. She progressed to the final and produced a lifetime best performance of 52.9 seconds to hold off home favourite Antónia Munkácsi by a small margin, with both athletes recording the same time. She ranked second in the world that year, behind only Australia's Judy Pollock, who was the world record holder for the 440 yards at the time. She was the first person from Slovakia to win gold at the competition. At the European Championships she was subject to a new procedure: she had to undergo a sex check by a panel of women doctors, in line with new rules set by the International Amateur Athletic Federation that year.

Chmelková was a little slower in the 1967 season, but still ranked in the top twenty at 54.4 seconds. She failed to defend her national title in 1967, with European indoor medalist Libuše Macounová taking the honour. She ran in the 400 m heats at the 1967 European Indoor Games, but was disqualified. The following year she was back on top nationally, improving her championship record to 54.1 seconds (a mark that lasted six years until Cerchlanová bettered it). She earned her a place on the team for Czechoslovakia at the 1968 Summer Olympics. However, she did not travel well to the Mexico City Olympic Games and was eliminated in the first round with a run of 54.9 seconds. She won her fourth and final national title in 1969 with a time of 54.7 seconds.

After retirement she became involved with officiating for Slovan Bratislava and also had a son, Vladimir. Until 2026, she remained the only Slovak woman to have topped the podium at the European Athletics Championships.

== National titles ==
- Czechoslovak Athletics Championships
  - 400 metres: 1964, 1966, 1968, 1969

== International competitions ==
| Year | Competition | Venue | Position | Event | Notes |
|---|---|---|---|---|---|
| 1966 | European Championships | Budapest, Hungary | 1st | 400 m | 52.9 |
| 1968 | Olympic Games | Mexico City, Mexico | 6th (heats) | 400 m | 54.9 |

== See also ==
- List of European Athletics Championships medalists (women)
