= Joke Bijleveld =

Dutch long jumper and sprinter (born 1940)

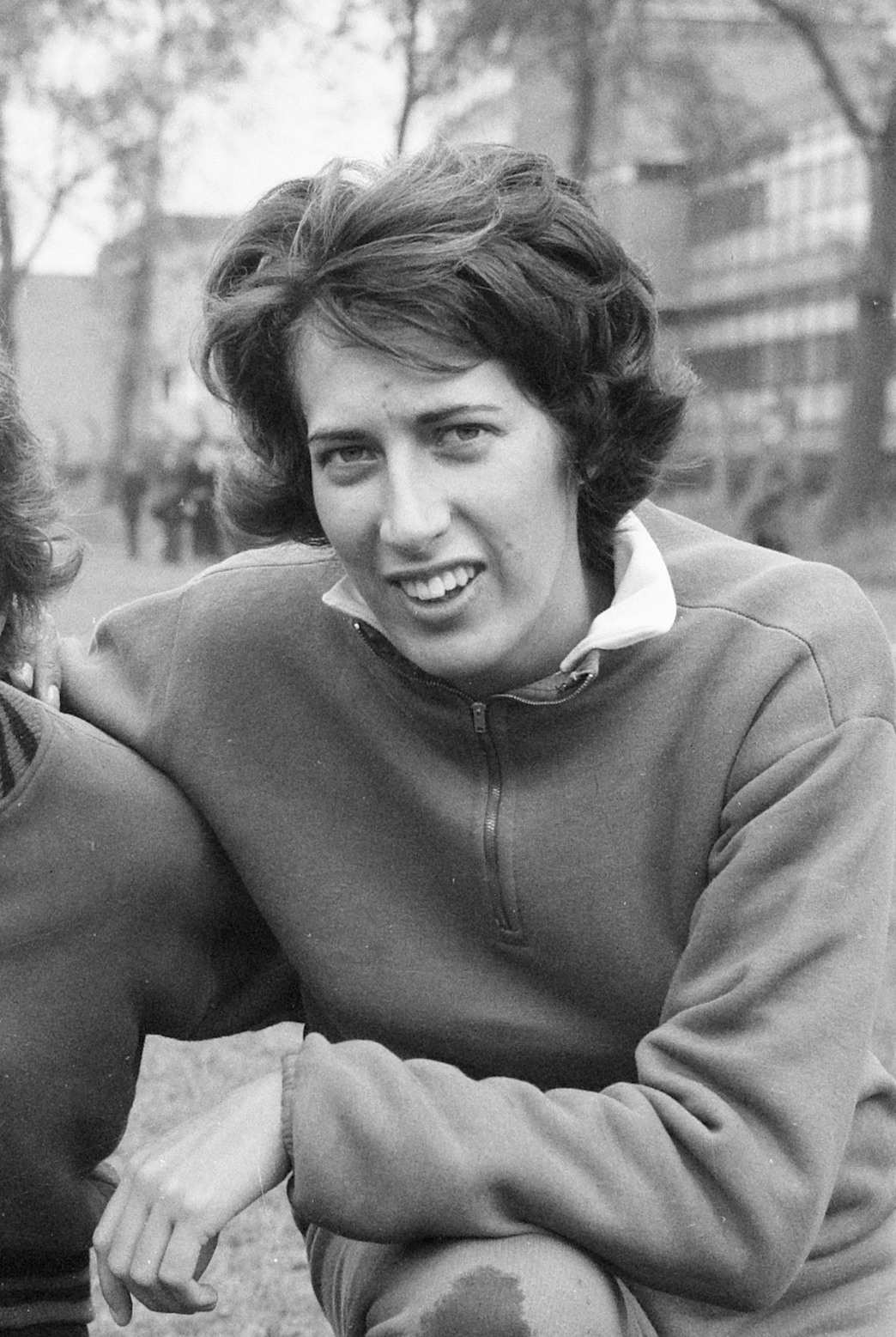
- Joke Bijleveld in 1962

Personal information
- Nationality: Dutch
- Born: 7 October 1940 (age 85) The Hague, the Netherlands
- Height: 1.75 m (5 ft 9 in)
- Weight: 61 kg (134 lb)

Sport
- Sport: Athletics
- Events: Sprint, long jump
- Club: Celebes, Den Haag

Johanna Catharina Antonia "Joke" Bijleveld (born 7 October 1940) is a retired Dutch track and field athlete who competed in the long jump at the 1960 Summer Olympics and 1964 Summer Olympics.

== Biography ==
Bijleveld finished second behind Dorothy Hyman in the 100 yards event at the British 1959 WAAA Championships.

At the 1960 Olympic Games in Rome she finished in seventh place in the long jump competition.

At the 1962 European Championships she finished fourth in the long jump, one centimeter short of the second-third place. Bijleveld won the British WAAA Championships title at the 1962 WAAA Championships.

At the 1964 Olympic Games in Tokyo she finished in fifteenth place in the long jump event and was eliminated in heat 4 of the 100 metres.

Awards
Preceded by Gerda Kraan	KNAU Cup; 1960	Succeeded by Gerda Kraan
