= Bert van Vlaanderen =

Dutch long-distance runner

Albert "Bert" van Vlaanderen (born 25 November 1964 in Tienhoven, Stichtse Vecht) is a retired long-distance runner from the Netherlands

== Biography ==
Van Vlaanderen participated in two Summer Olympics. At the 1992 Olympic Marathon in Barcelona he finished in fifteenth position with a time of 2 hours, 15 minutes and 47 seconds. Four years later in Atlanta, Georgia Van Vlaanderen ended the marathon in 45th place, clocking 2:20.48. His best performance was the bronze medal at the 1993 World Championships in Stuttgart.

== Achievements ==
- All results regarding marathon, unless stated otherwise

Year	Competition	Venue	Position	Notes
Representing the Netherlands
1992	Olympic Games	Barcelona, Spain	15th	2:15:47
1993	World Championships	Stuttgart, Germany	3rd	2:15:12
1996	Olympic Games	Atlanta, United States	45th	2:20:48

Awards
Preceded by Robert de Wit	Herman van Leeuwen Cup; 1993 – 1995	Succeeded by Marko Koers
