= Frans Künen =

Dutch long-distance runner

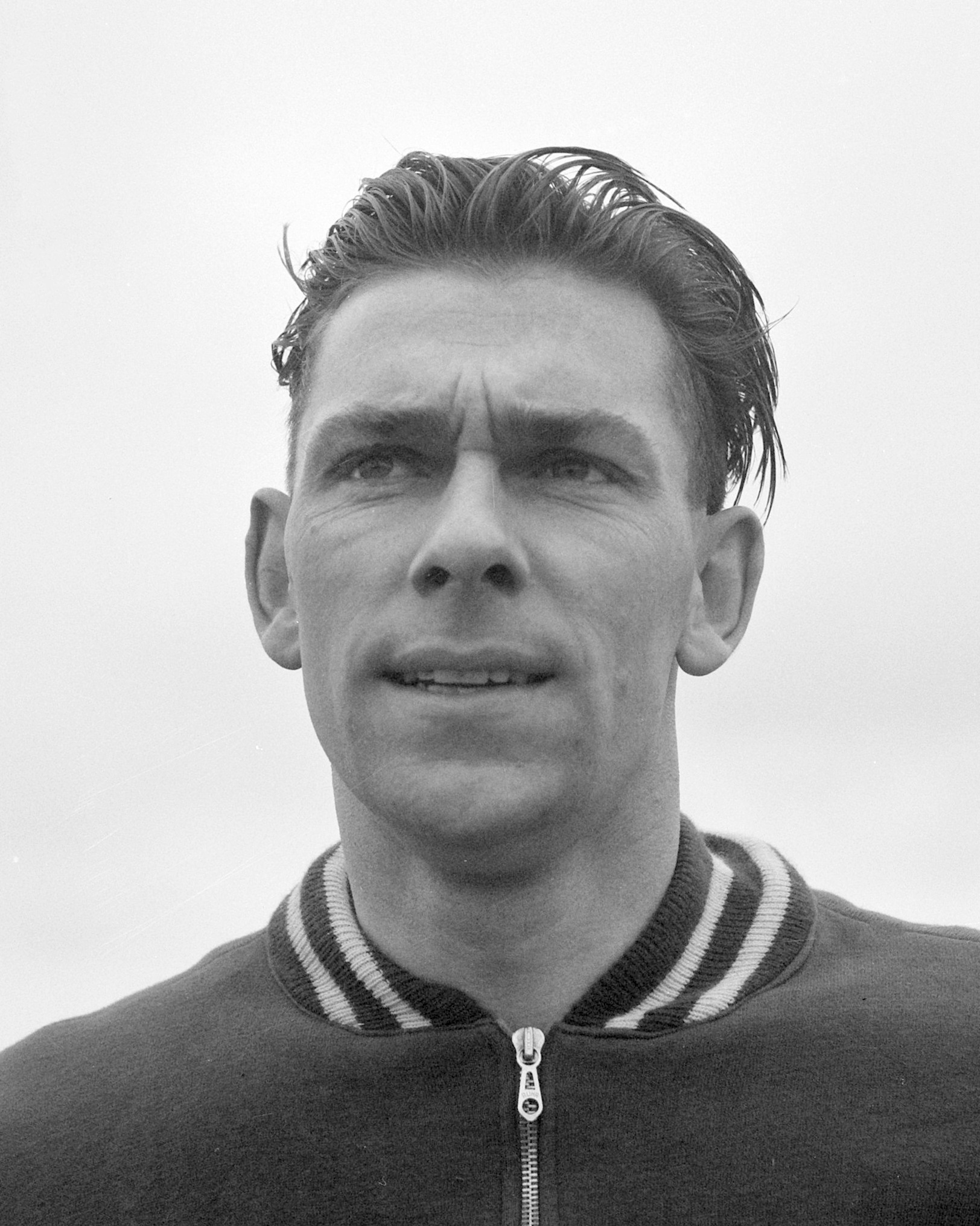
- Frans Künen in 1961

Personal information
- Born: 17 April 1930 Breda, the Netherlands
- Died: 23 November 2011 (aged 81) Breda, the Netherlands
- Height: 1.78 m (5 ft 10 in)
- Weight: 68 kg (150 lb)

Sport
- Sport: Running
- Club: Sprint, Breda

Franciscus Josephus Henricus "Frans" Künen (17 April 1930 – 23 November 2011) was a Dutch long-distance runner. He competed in the marathon at the 1960 Summer Olympics in Rome and finished in 36th place. He held the Dutch records in the 10,000 m from 1956 to 1958 and in the Marathon from 1960 to 1969.

Künen started training in running at age 20, while working as a sports instructor at the Dutch Air Force. In 1956, he set a national record in the 10,000 m and won a national cross-country title. Later he became national champion in the 10,000 m (1959, 1961) and marathon (1960). The 1960 title was his first attempt at marathon, and it set a new national record. Internationally, Künen competed in country matches and International Military Championships, winning the 5,000 m in 1956. His best achievement at the International Cross Country Championships (forerunner of the World Championships) was 21st place in 1957.

Awards
Preceded by Cor Aafjes	KNAU Cup; 1956	Succeeded by Hannie Bloemhof
