= Gerda Kraan =

Dutch middle-distance runner

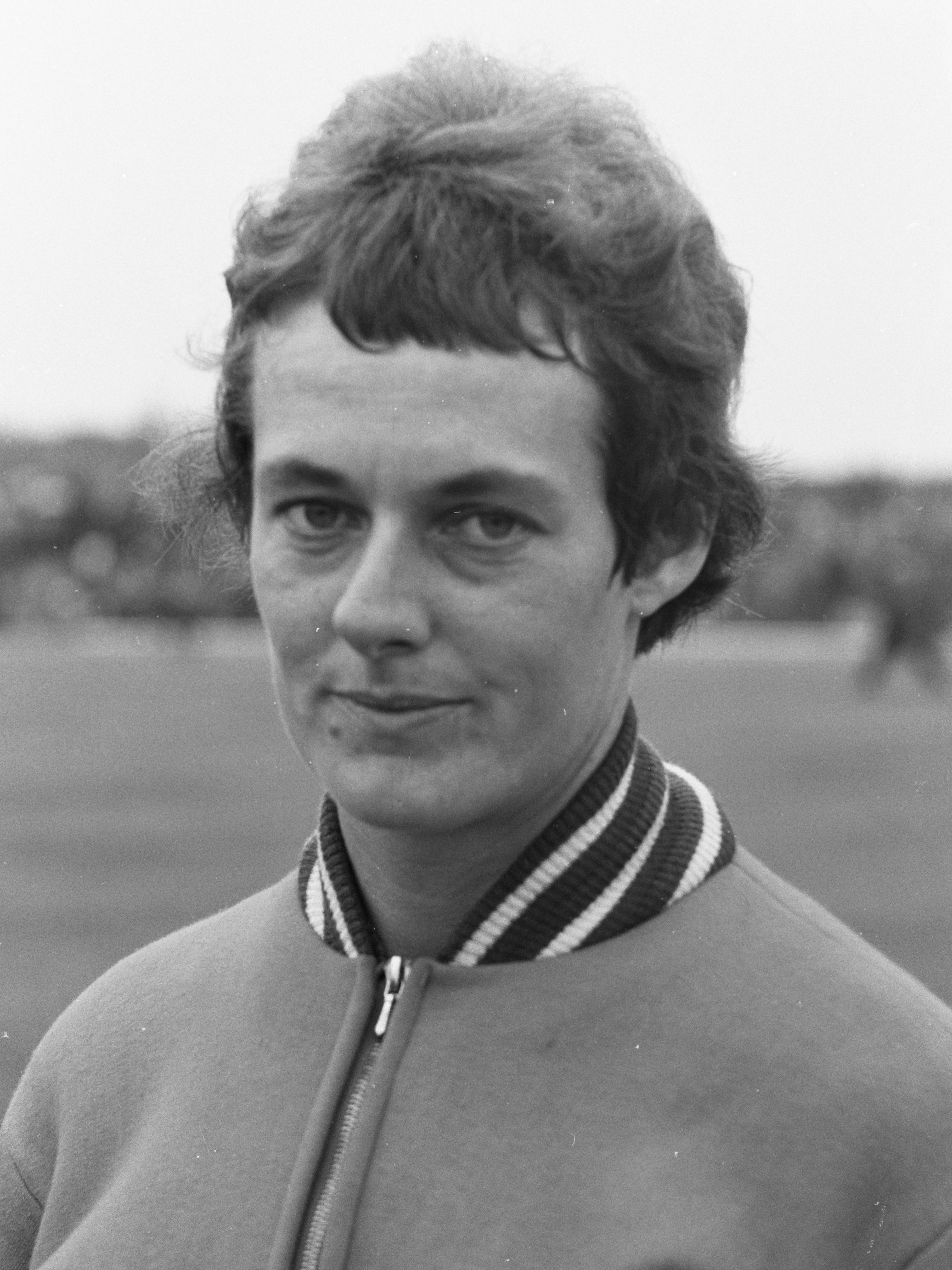
- Gerda Kraan in 1961

Personal information
- Born: 30 July 1933 (age 93) Leiden, Netherlands
- Height: 1.73 m (5 ft 8 in)
- Weight: 65 kg (143 lb)

Sport
- Sport: Running
- Club: De Bataven, Leiden
Medal record
Women's athletics
Representing Netherlands
European Championships
Gold medal – first place	1962 Belgrade	800 m

Gerarda "Gerda" Maria Kraan (Dutch: [ɣeːˈrɑrdaː ˈɣɛrdaː maːˈrijaː ˈkraːn]; born 30 July 1933) is a retired female middle distance runner from the Netherlands, who twice represented her native country at the Summer Olympics: 1960 (Rome) and 1964 (Tokyo). In 1962 she won the gold medal in the women's 800 metres race at the 1962 European Championships in Belgrade.

Kraan is the oldest sibling in a family of 14 children. Initially she trained in handball, while working as a police officer, and changed to athletics only in 1954, aged 21. At her first major race in 1958 she improved the Dutch record in the 800 m to 2:16.6. She shaved another 8 seconds from it the next year, and in 1960 qualified for the Olympics, where she was eliminated in a preliminary round. After that she worked hard to improve her running technique and fitness, winning five national titles and setting nine national 800 m records between 1958 and 1963. During that period she also competed in 400 m, 440 yd and 880 yd races. In 1962 she won the 800 m European title with a new European record of 2:02.8. At the next Olympics in 1964 she finished in seventh place in the final of the 800 m.

Awards
Preceded by Dini Hobers	KNAU Cup; 1959; 1961, 1962	Succeeded by Joke Bijleveld
Preceded by Joke Bijleveld	KNAU Cup; 1959; 1961, 1962	Succeeded by Lia Hinten
