= Joan Fisher =

Canadian sprinter

Personal information
- Born: 26 September 1949 (age 76) Ottawa, Ontario, Canada

Sport
- Sport: Sprinting
- Event: 400 metres

Joan Fisher (born 26 September 1949) is a Canadian sprinter. She competed in the women's 400 metres at the 1968 Summer Olympics. She was in the first induction of the Lisgar Collegiate Institute Athletic Wall of Fame, as part of the 160th Anniversary celebrations.
