= Kiyoko Ogawa =

Japanese sprinter

Personal information
- Nationality: Japanese
- Born: 4 November 1946 (age 78)

Sport
- Sport: Sprinting
- Event: 400 metres

Kiyoko Ogawa (小川 清子, Ogawa Kiyoko; born 4 November 1946) is a Japanese sprinter. She competed in the women's 400 metres at the 1964 Summer Olympics.
