= Hannie Bloemhof =

Dutch sprinter

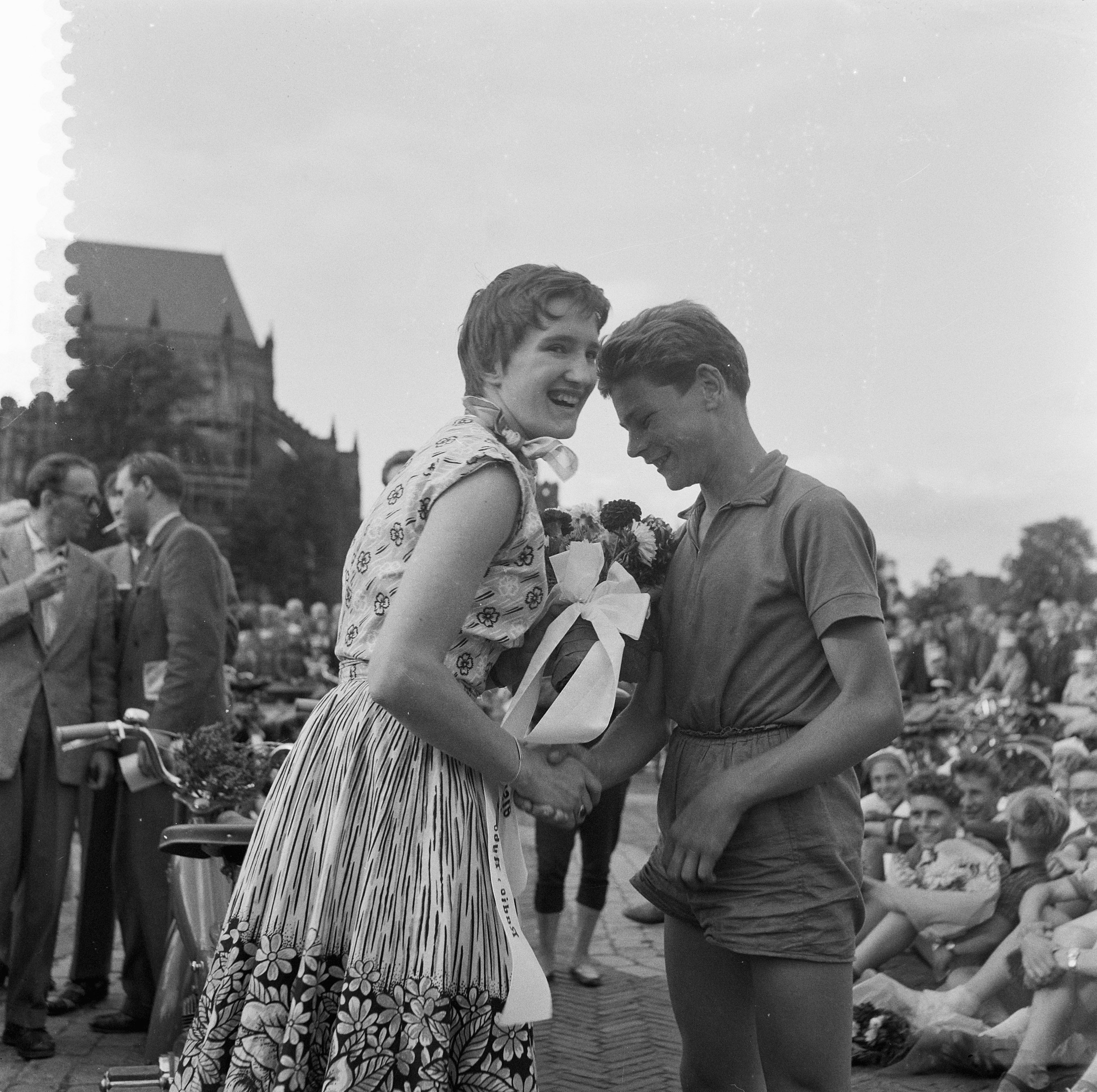
Hannie Bloemhof (left) in 1957

Johanna "Hannie" Bloemhof (born 16 February 1936) is a former Dutch sprinter. She won the KNAU Cup, the award for the Dutch athlete of the year, for her performances in 1957. She competed in the 100 metres, 200 metres, and 4 × 100 metres relay at the 1958 European Athletics Championships in Stockholm, Sweden. On 23 May 1960, she married footballer Piet Beekman in Arnhem.

Awards
| Preceded by Frans Künen | KNAU Cup; 1957 | Succeeded by Diny Hobers |
