= Han Myung-hee (sprinter) =

South Korean sprinter

Personal information
- Nationality: South Korean
- Born: 20 November 1945 (age 79)

Sport
- Sport: Sprinting
- Event: 400 metres

Han Myung-hee (born 20 November 1945) is a South Korean sprinter. She competed in the women's 400 metres at the 1964 Summer Olympics.

In 1961 and 1962, Han maintained a rivalry with Jang Sook in the middle distances, with both athletes trading several South Korean records in the 400 m and 800 m.
