= Hilde Slaman =

Dutch sprinter

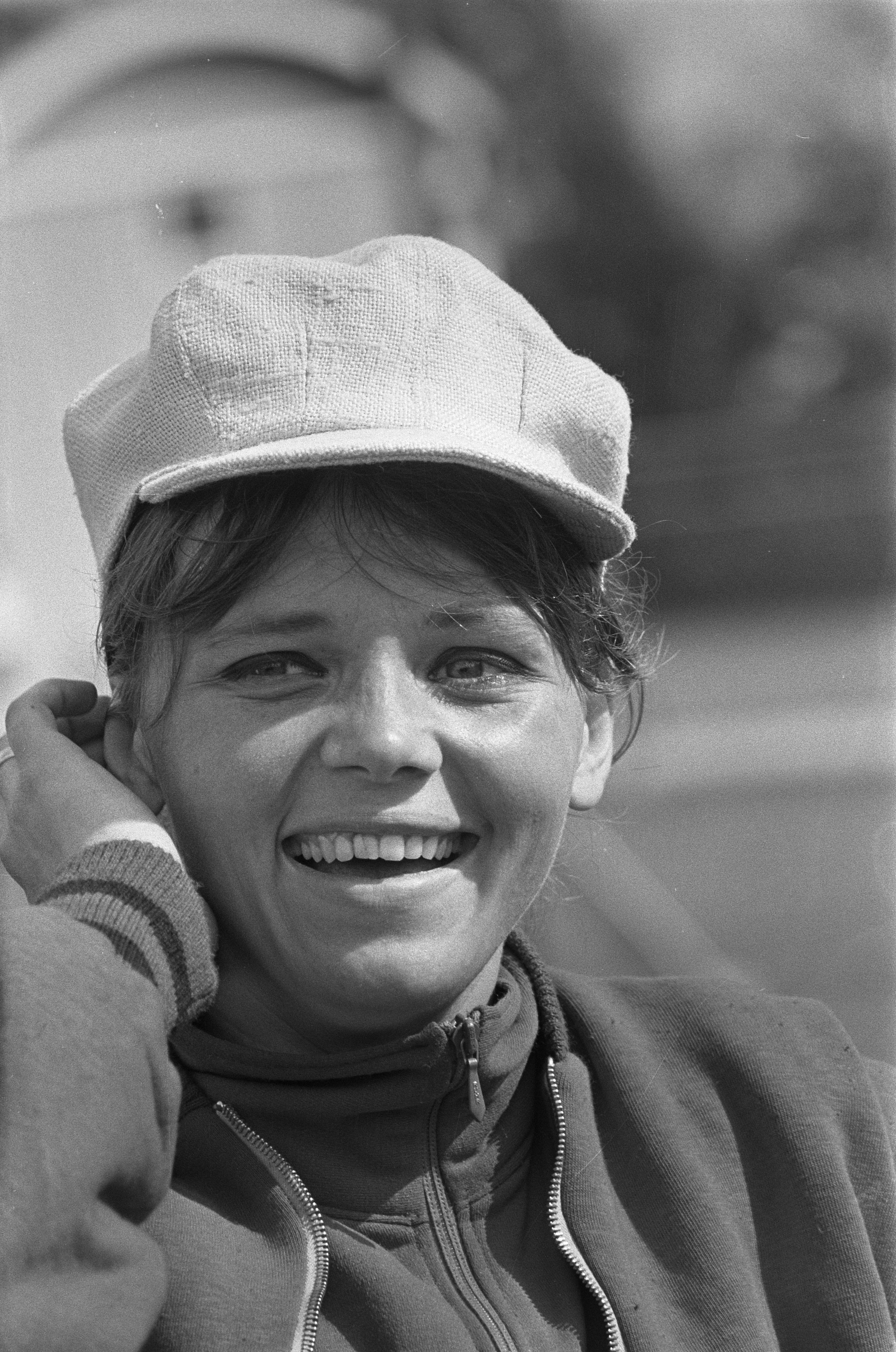
- Hilde Slaman in 1966

Personal information
- Nationality: Dutch
- Born: 19 July 1943 (age 82) Netherlands

Sport
- Sport: Athletics
- Event: 400m/440y

Hilde Slaman van Doorn (born 19 July 1943) is a former Dutch sprinter and middle-distance runner.

== Biography ==
Slaman van Doorn won the KNAU Cup, the award for the female Dutch athlete of year, for her performances in 1965.

Slaman van Doorn won the British WAAA Championships title in the 440 yards event at the 1966 WAAA Championships.

She competed in the 400 metres at the 1966 European Athletics Championships in Budapest, Hungary. On 29 July 1968, she set a Dutch record in the 3 × 800 metres relay in 6:43 min together with Betty Kok and Tilly van der Made.

Awards
Preceded by Tilly van der Made	KNAU Cup; 1965; With: Ilja Laman	Succeeded by Corrie Bakker
