= Joy Grieveson =

British sprinter (born 1941)

Personal information
- Nationality: British (English)
- Born: 31 October 1941 (age 84) Marylebone, London, England
- Height: 167 cm (5 ft 6 in)
- Weight: 62 kg (137 lb)

Sport
- Sport: Athletics
- Event: 400m/440y
- Club: Darlington Harriers
Medal record
Women's athletics
Representing Great Britain
European Championships
Silver medal – second place	1962 Belgrade	400 m

Elizabeth Joyce "Joy" Grieveson (born 31 October 1941) from Darlington, England, is a retired track and field athlete.

== Biography ==
Grieveson finished third behind Maeve Kyle in the 440 yards event at the 1961 WAAA Championships and second behind Jean Sorrell in the same event at the 1962 WAAA Championships.

During the same year of 1962, she won the silver medal in the women's 400 metres at the 1962 European Athletics Championships in Belgrade, Yugoslavia, having taken a week's leave from work to compete. She came in behind Maria Itkina of the Soviet Union, and ahead of Tilly van der Made of the Netherlands. She also represented England in the 220 and 880 yards, at the 1962 British Empire and Commonwealth Games in Perth, Western Australia.

Grieveson became the national 440 yards champion after winning the British WAAA Championships title at the 1963 WAAA Championships and then represented Great Britain in the 1964 Tokyo Olympics, and was one of the favourites, but a hamstring injury hampered her chances and she only reached the semi-final.

She retired from athletics after her second Commonwealth Games, where she competed for the England team in the 440 yards at the 1966 Commonwealth Games.

Grieveson married Darlington F.C. footballer Stan Watson in 1967.
