= Tilly van der Zwaard =

Dutch sprinter and middle-distance runner (1938–2019)

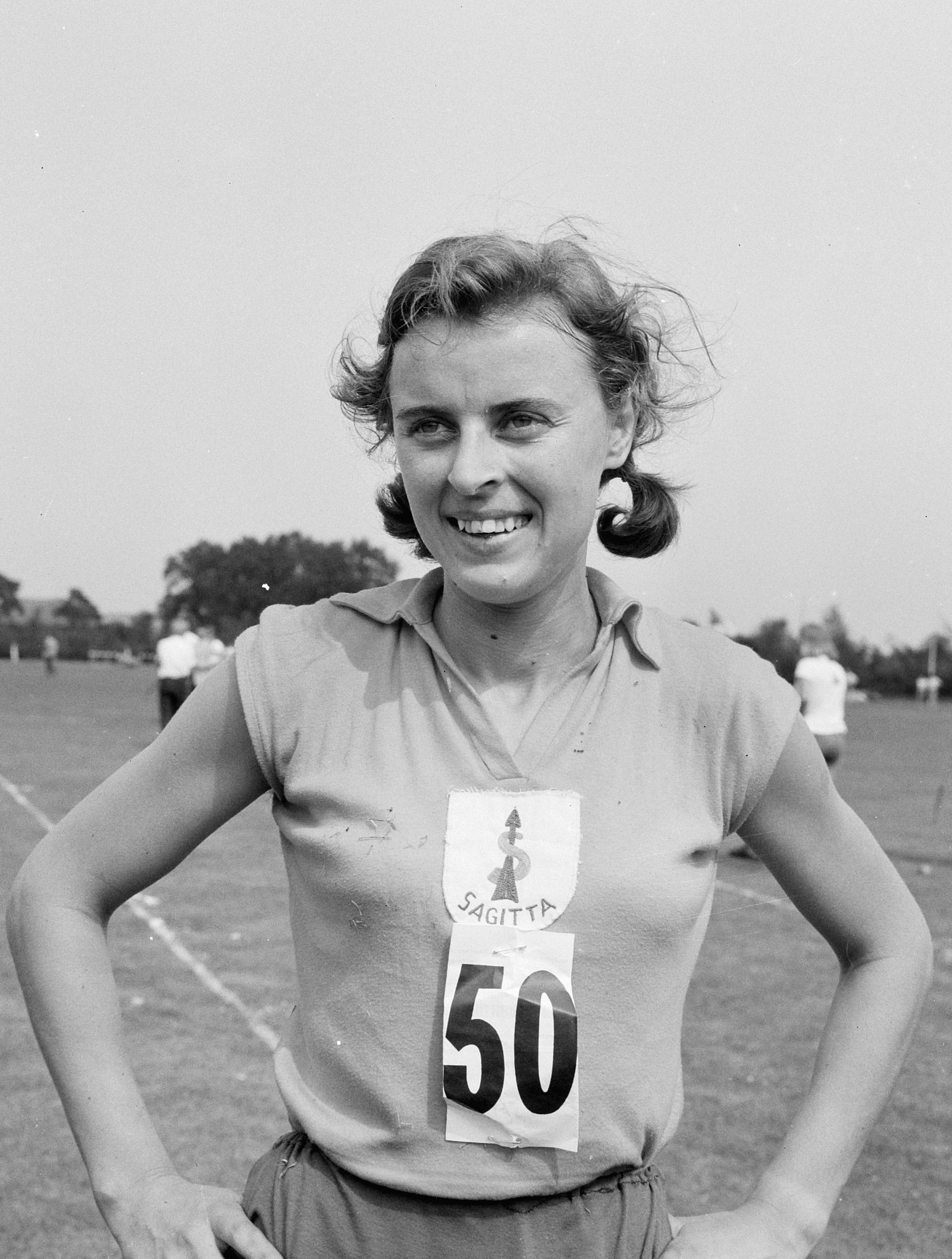
- Tilly van der Zwaard in 1964

Personal information
- Born: Mathilda Catrina van der Zwaard; 18 January 1938 Leiden, Netherlands
- Died: 6 February 2019 (aged 81) Edgewater, Florida, U.S.
- Height: 1.68 m (5 ft 6 in)
- Weight: 55 kg (121 lb)

Sport
- Sport: Middle distance running
- Club: Sagitta, Amsterdam
Medal record
Women's athletics
Representing Netherlands
European Championships
Bronze medal – third place	1962 Belgrade	400 metres

Tilly van der Zwaard (18 January 1938 – 6 February 2019) was a middle distance runner from the Netherlands. At the 1962 European Athletics Championships in Belgrade she won a bronze medal in the 400 m event, behind Maria Itkina of the Soviet Union and Joy Grieveson of Great Britain.

Van der Zwaard twice represented her native country in the 400 m event at the Summer Olympics, in 1964 and 1968. Her best achievement was sixth place in 1964.

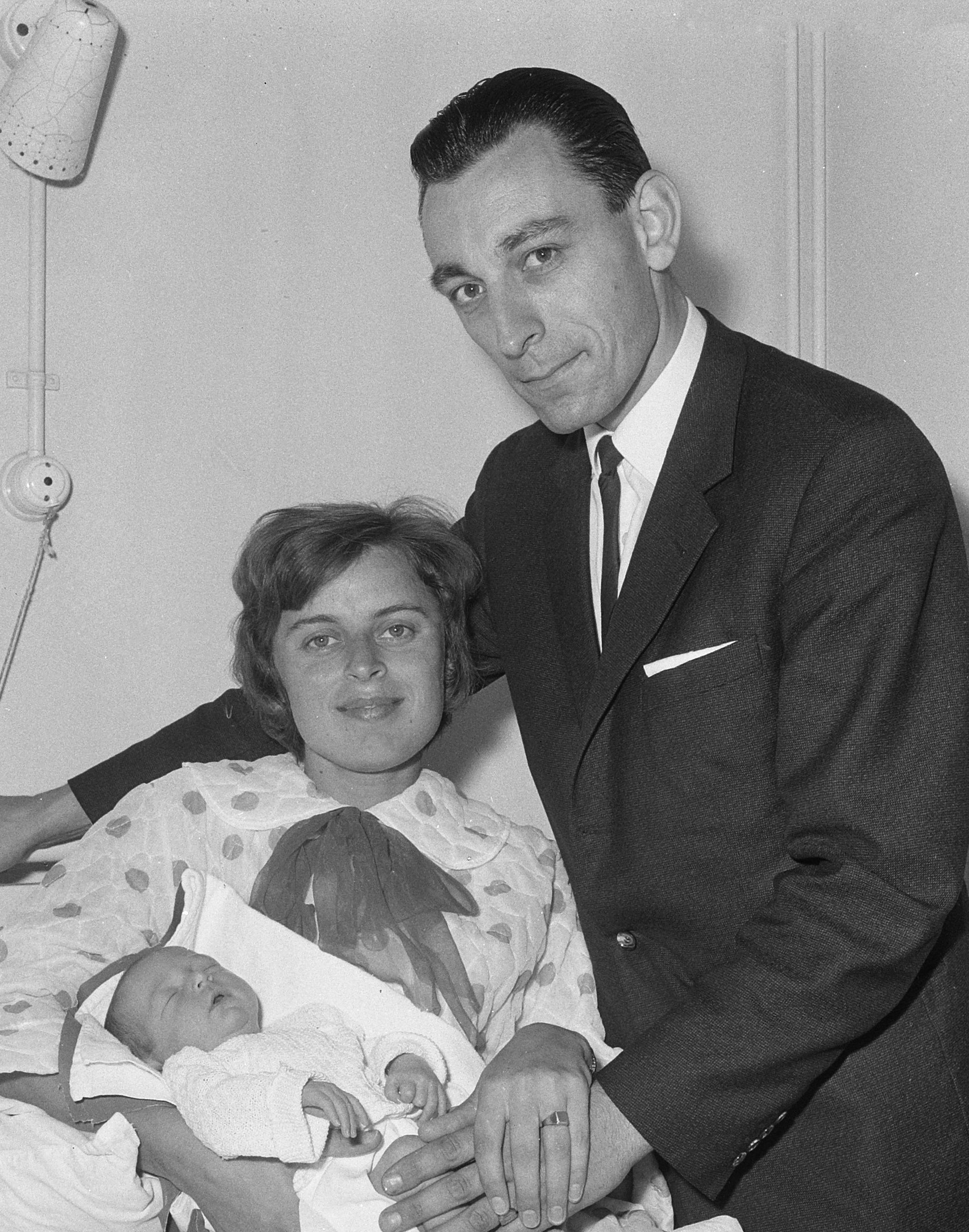
Tilly van der Zwaard with husband and daughter Eveline in July 1966

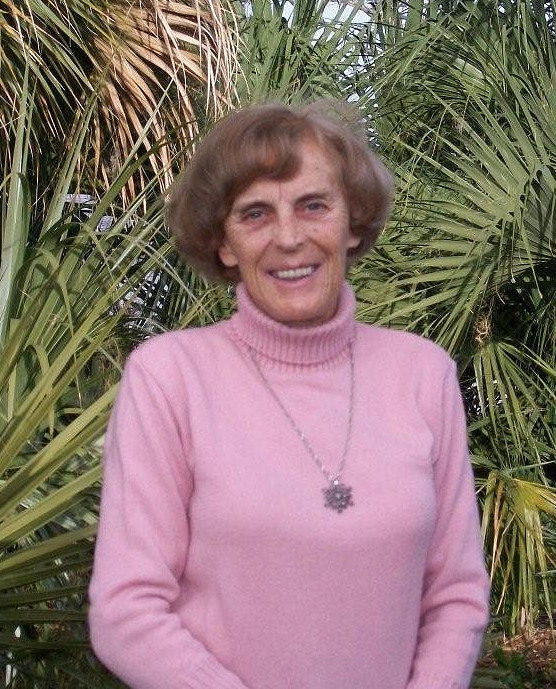
Tilly van der Zwaard in her garden in Edgewater, Florida, December 2010

She was born Mathilda Catrina van der Zwaard in Leiden, Netherlands. On 25 November 1964 she married Ger van der Made and changed her name to van der Made-van der Zwaard. After their divorce, she dropped van der Made from her name. She moved to the United States after retiring from athletics and died February 2019 in Edgewater, Florida.

Awards
Preceded by Lia Hinten	KNAU Cup; 1964	Succeeded by Ilja Laman; Hilde Slaman-van Doorn
