= Maeve Kyle =

Irish athlete (1928–2025)

Maeve Kyle OBE
- Kyle in 1964

Personal information
- Born: 6 October 1928 Urlingford, County Kilkenny, Ireland
- Died: 23 July 2025 (aged 96)

Sport
- Country: Ireland
- Sport: Athletics
- Events: 100, 200, 400 800 meters
- Club: Ballymena and Antrim AC
Medal record
European Indoor Championships
Bronze medal – third place	1966 Dortmund	400m

Maeve Kyle
Personal information
- Full name: Maeve Esther Enid Kyle
- Born: 6 October 1928 Ireland
- Died: 23 July 2025 (aged 96)
- Height: 160 cm (5 ft 3 in)

Sport
- Sport: Field hockey
Senior career
Years	Team	Caps	Goals
–	Instonians	-	-

Maeve Esther Enid Kyle (née Shankey; 6 October 1928 – 23 July 2025) was an Irish hockey international who also represented Ireland in three Olympic Games. She competed at the 1956 Summer Olympics, the 1960 Summer Olympics and the 1964 Summer Olympics, and was Ireland's first female track and field Olympian. Kyle represented Northern Ireland in the Commonwealth Games in 1958 and 1970 and won the prestigious WAAA Championships in the 440 yards in 1961.

In hockey, her "first love", she gained 46 Irish caps as well as representing three of the four Irish provinces (Leinster, Munster and Ulster) at different stages of her career. She was named in the World All-Star team in 1953 and 1959. She was also a competitor in tennis, swimming, sailing and cricket and worked as an athletics club coach. She was awarded the OBE in 2008.

Her friend and Olympic gold medallist Mary Peters paid tribute to her as a "pioneer of women's sport in both athletics and hockey for Ireland".

== Biography ==
Kyle was born in Urlingford, County Kilkenny, and raised at no. 13 John Street, Kilkenny. She played handball, to which she attributed her excellent hand-eye coordination, and touch rugby. She attended Kilkenny College, where her father C.G. Shankey was headmaster. She later went to Alexandra College aged 10 and then Trinity College Dublin, where she read Medicine before changing to Natural Sciences. She was the granddaughter of William Thrift, provost of Trinity. She moved to Ballymena after marrying Sean Kyle, whom she met in Antrim with the Irish hockey squad in 1953. They were married in 1954 and had a daughter, Shauna. The Kyles founded Ballymena and Antrim Athletics Club.

At the 1956 Melbourne Olympics, Kyle competed in the 100-metre and 200-metre events. By now a mother, her selection caused uproar in the conservative Irish society of the time and she was also obliged to pay up to £200 towards the cost of representing Ireland. Kyle lost a baby son, Michael-John, born not long after the Olympics. Later Kyle observed that she had felt like the "Irish suffragette of athletics" at the time.

Kyle finished third behind Janet Gaunt in the pentathlon event at the 1958 WAAA Championships.

At the 1960 Olympic Games in Rome, she competed in both the 100 and 200 metre events. Kyle recalled sitting down with Muhammad Ali, then aged 19, whom she felt "had greatness ahead of him".

In the following year she won the British WAAA 440 yards event at the 1961 WAAA Championships and was a medallist in the next three years. In 1961 she also set a British all-comers quarter-mile record of 56.2 seconds at the Highland Games.

At the 1964 Olympic Games in Tokyo, she reached the semi-finals of both the 400m and 800m. In 1966, she took bronze in the 400m at the 1966 European Indoor Athletics Championships in Dortmund.

Aged 42, Kyle reached the final of the 400 m at the 1970 Commonwealth Games.

She won four gold medals in the W45 category at the 1977 World Masters Championship in Gothenburg in the 100m, 400m, high jump and long jump. She held World Masters records in the W40 category for the 100m (12.00 secs) and 400m (55.30 secs), in the W45 category for the 100m (12.50 secs) and in the W50 category for the long jump at 5.04m.

Kyle attended her fourth Olympics in Sydney in 2000 as coach to the Irish track and field team.

Kyle died on 23 July 2025 in a nursing home, at the age of 96.

Mary Peters spoke warmly of Kyle: "I have known Maeve for 70 years and she was a pioneer of women's sport in both athletics and hockey for Ireland. She encouraged a lot of young people like me to get involved in sport. Now having made it to her 96th year may she rest in peace".

== Honours ==
Kyle was awarded the Lifetime Achievement Award at the 2006 Coaching Awards in London in recognition of her work with athletes at the Ballymena and Antrim Athletics Club. Earlier in 2006 she was one of 10 players who were initially installed into the Irish Hockey Hall of Fame. She was appointed Officer of the Order of the British Empire (OBE) in the 2008 New Year Honours. In the same year she was voted into the RTÉ/Irish Sports Council Hall of Fame and later elected as a life vice-president of Athletics Ireland. She received the honorary degree of doctor of the university from the University of Ulster in 2006.

In March 2020, in recognition of International Women's Day An Post issued a stamp to honour Kyle. She was also honoured with a plaque on the house where she grew up.

Hockey Ireland considered her "one of Ireland’s most accomplished multi-sport athletes".

== Athletics international competitions ==
Year	Competition	Venue	Position	Event	Notes
Representing Ireland
1956	Summer Olympics	Melbourne, Australia		100m	12.3
1956	Summer Olympics	Melbourne, Australia		200m	26.4
1960	Summer Olympics	Rome, Italy		100m	12.59
1960	Summer Olympics	Rome, Italy		200m	25.06
1962	European Championships	Belgrade, Yugoslavia	6th	400m	57.5
1962	European Championships	Belgrade, Yugoslavia		800m	2:13.0 NR
1964	Summer Olympics	Tokyo, Japan		400m	semi-finals 55.3
1964	Summer Olympics	Tokyo, Japan		800m	semi-finals (2:11.3)
1966	European Indoor Athletics Championships	Dortmund, Germany	3rd	400m	57.3
1966	European Athletics Championships	Budapest, Hungary		400m	55.4
1966	European Athletics Championships	Budapest, Hungary		800m	2:13.2
