= Janell Smith =

American sprinter (1947–2020)

Personal information
- Full name: Linda Janell Carson
- Born: Linda Janell Smith; May 3, 1947 Killeen, Texas, United States
- Died: July 25, 2020 (aged 73) Parsons, Kansas, United States

Sport
- Sport: Sprinting
- Event: 400 metres

Linda Janell Carson (née Smith; May 3, 1947 – July 25, 2020) was an American sprinter. She competed in the women's 400 metres at the 1964 Summer Olympics. She died of cancer in 2020 at the age of 73.
