= Mirna van der Hoeven =

Dutch sprinter

Personal information
- Nationality: Dutch
- Born: 8 May 1948 (age 78) The Hague, Netherlands
- Height: 1.75 m (5 ft 9 in)
- Weight: 63 kg (139 lb)

Sport
- Sport: Athletics
- Event: 400 metres
- Club: Olympia '48, Den Haag

Hermina Johanna van der Hoeven-Jansen (better known as Mirna van der Hoeven, born 8 May 1948) is a retired sprinter from the Netherlands who competed at the 1968 Summer Olympics.

== Biography ==
Der Hoeven won the British WAAA Championships title in the 400 metres event at the 1968 WAAA Championships.

Later that year at the 1968 Olympic Games in Mexico City, she represented Netherlands in the 400 metres and finished second in the semifinal, setting her career record at 52.69 seconds. However, she slowed down to 53.0 s in the final and finished last.
