= Lois Anne Drinkwater =

American sprinter (born 1951)

Personal information
- Born: April 15, 1951 (age 74) Phoenix, Arizona, United States

Sport
- Sport: Sprinting
- Event: 400 metres

Lois Anne Drinkwater (born April 15, 1951) is an American sprinter. She competed in the women's 400 metres at the 1968 Summer Olympics while still a student at Central High School in Phoenix, Arizona.
