= Patricia Kippax =

British sprinter

Personal information
- Nationality: British
- Born: 23 September 1941
- Died: 17 August 2009 (aged 67)

Sport
- Sport: Sprinting
- Event: 400 metres

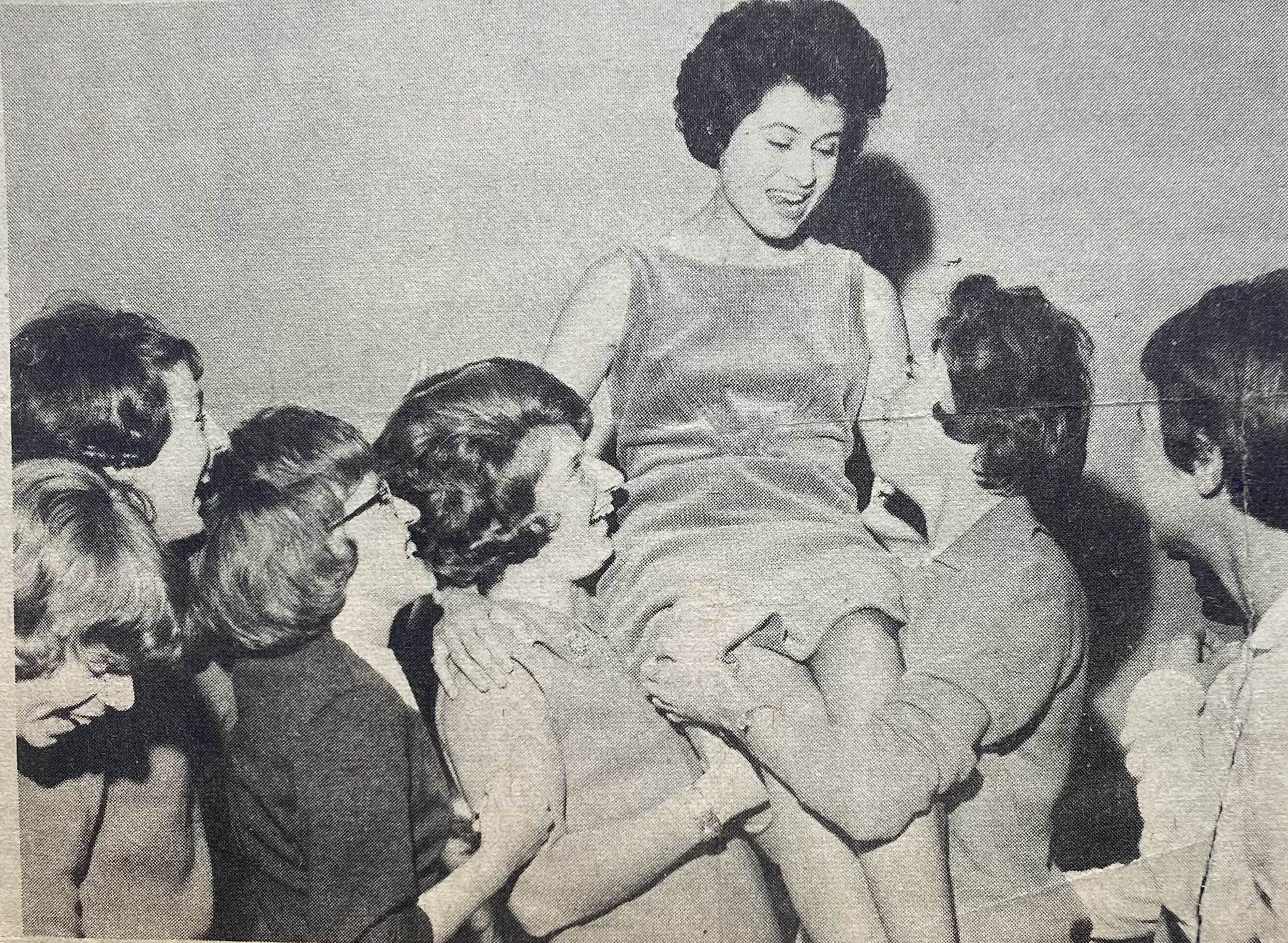
Patricia being welcomed home from the Tokyo Olympics, 1964

Patricia Kippax (23 September 1941 – 17 August 2009) was a British sprinter. She was a member of Cambridge Harriers Athletics Club. She competed in the women's 400 metres at the 1964 Summer Olympics, finishing fifth in the semi-final.

== Early life ==
She attended the Prendergast Girls Grammar School in Catford.
