= Margret Buscher =

German sprinter

Personal information
- Nationality: German
- Born: 8 February 1938
- Died: 18 April 1991 (aged 53)

Sport
- Sport: Sprinting
- Event: 400 metres

Margret Buscher (8 February 1938 – 18 April 1991) was a German sprinter. She competed in the women's 400 metres at the 1964 Summer Olympics.
