= Lia Hinten =

Dutch athlete (1942–2021)

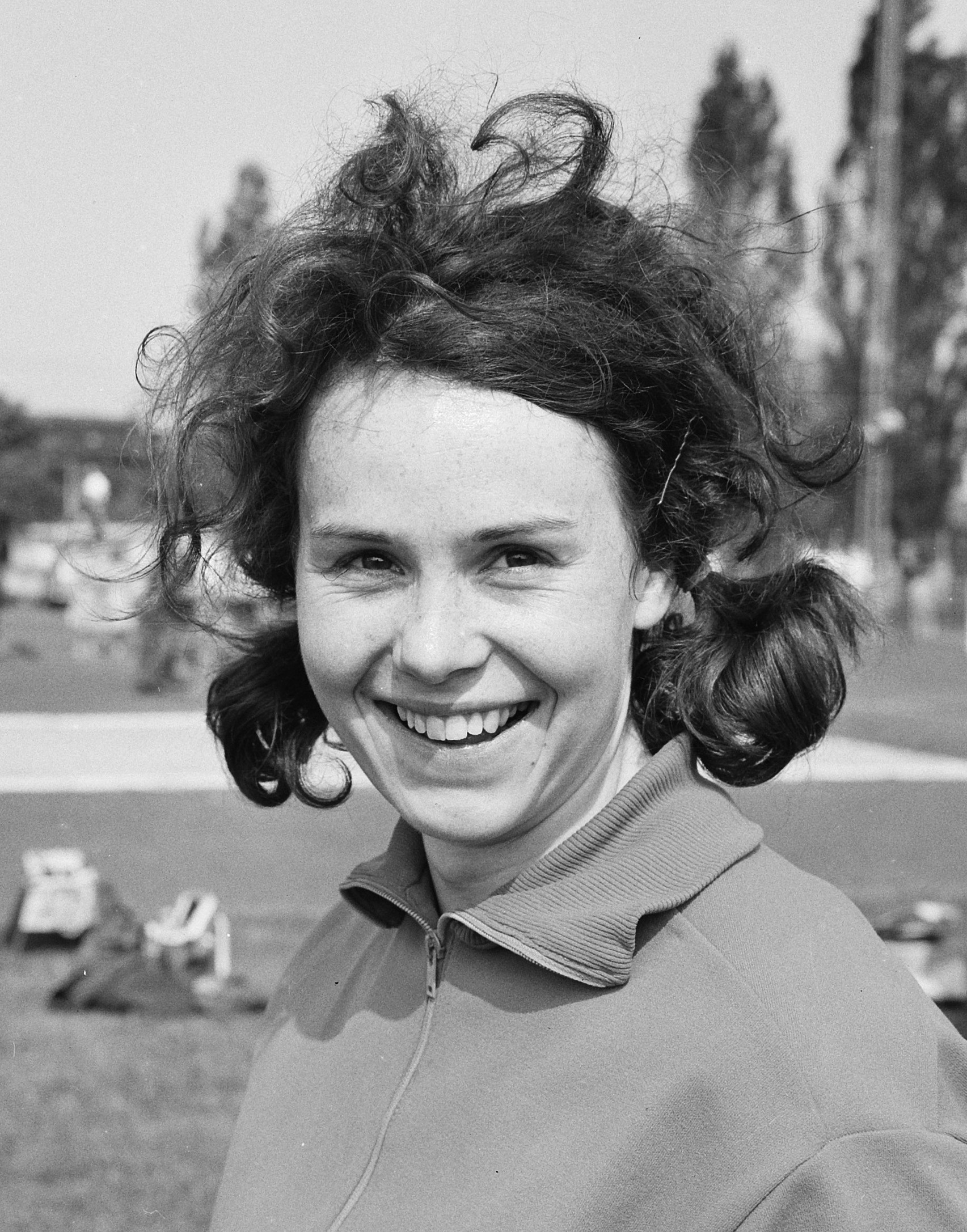
- Hinten in 1964

Personal information
- Born: 26 August 1942 Tilburg, Netherlands
- Died: 26 April 2021 (aged 78)
- Height: 1.68 m (5 ft 6 in)
- Weight: 60 kg (130 lb)

Sport
- Sport: Athletics
- Club: K&K, Tilburg
Medal record
Representing the Netherlands
European Indoor Championships
Silver medal – second place	1967 Prague	400 m

Amelia Antonia Josepha Hinten (26 August 1942 – 26 April 2021) was a Dutch athlete. She competed at the 1964 Summer Olympics in the pentathlon and finished in 14th place. After marrying W. Louer on 22 April 1966 she changed her name to Lia Louer and won a silver medal in the 400 m at the 1967 European Indoor Games.

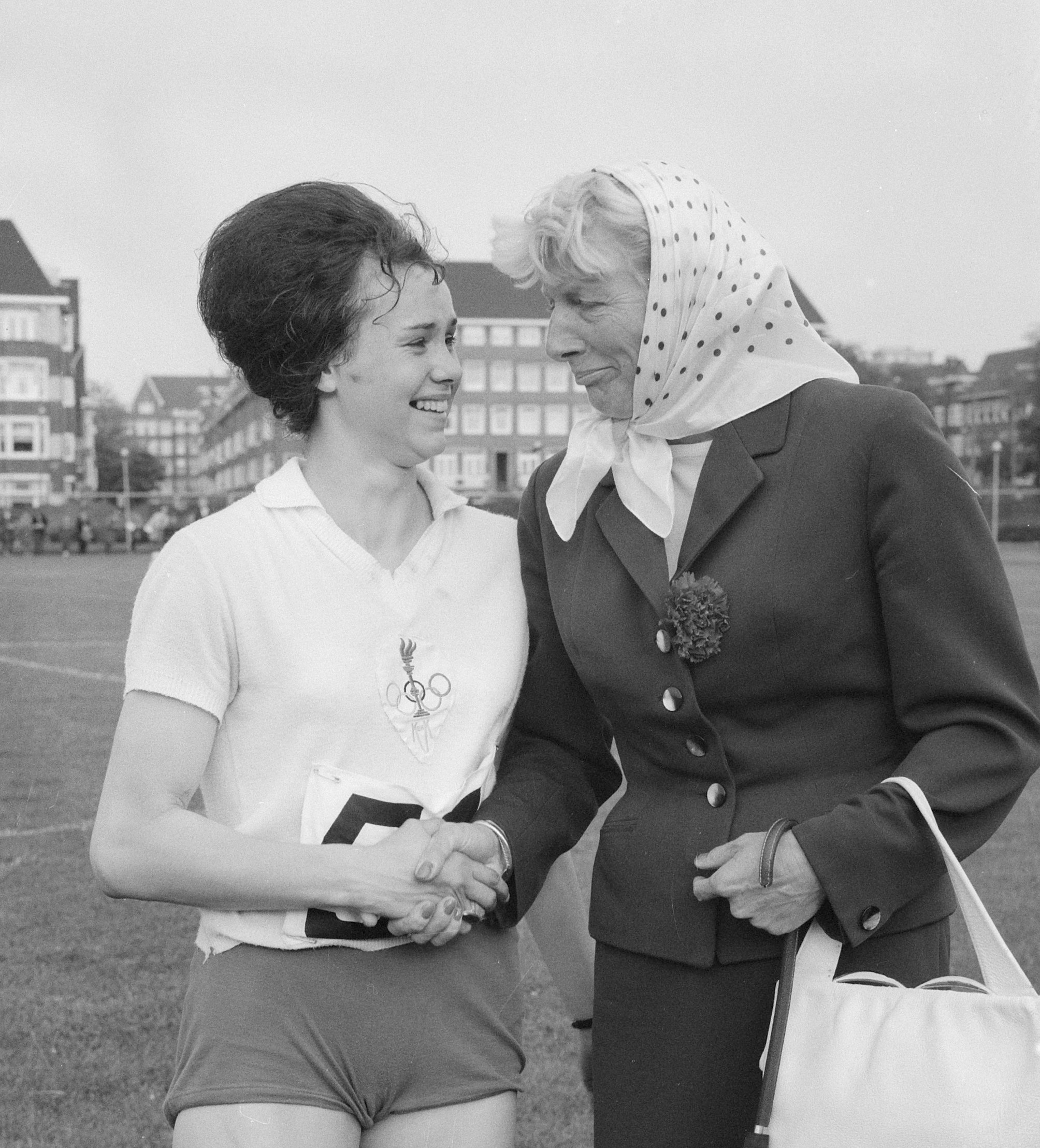
Lia Hinten is congratulated by Fanny Blankers-Koen with winning the national 80 m hurdles title on 12 August 1962

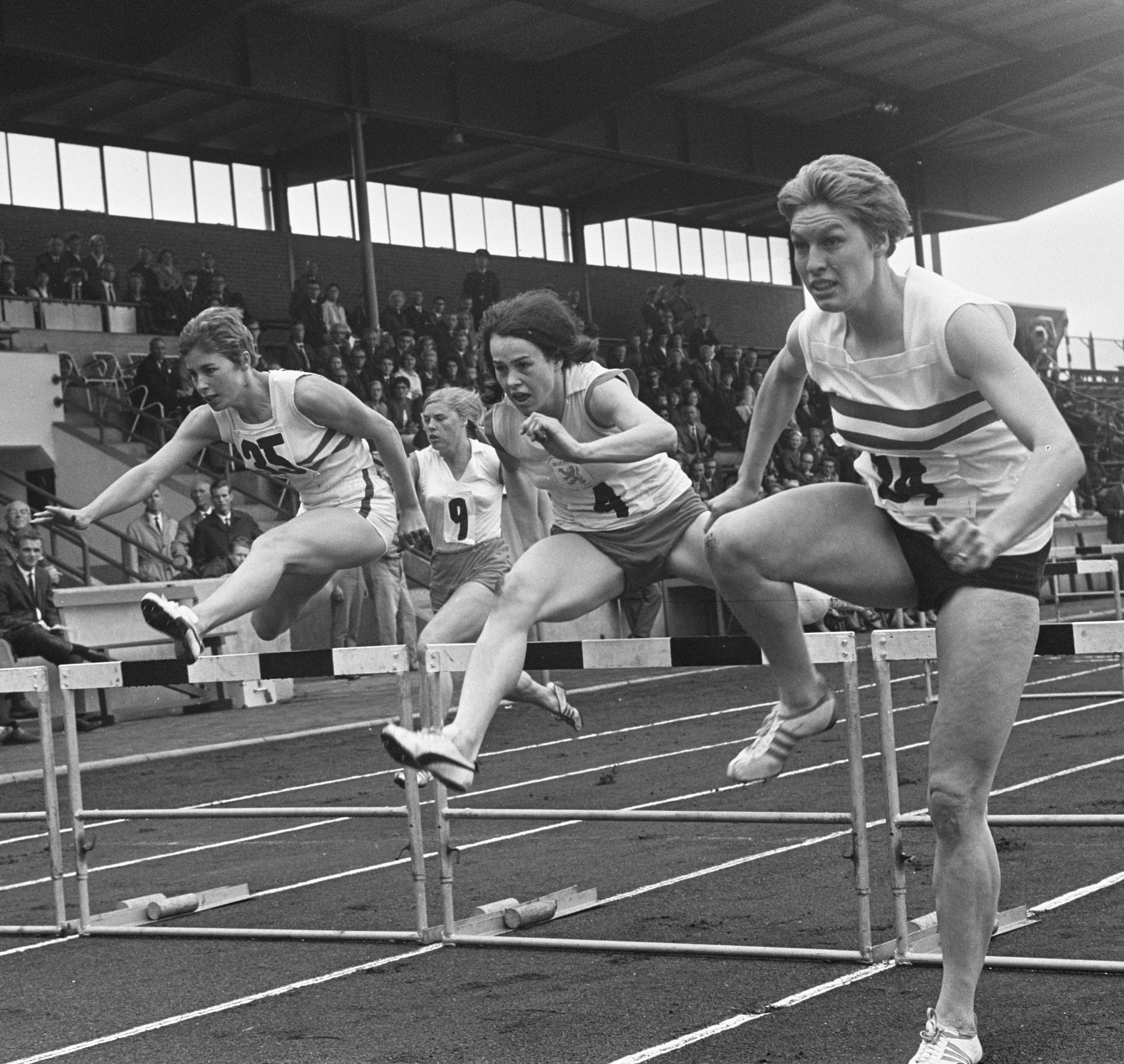
Mary Rand, Lia Hinten and Pat Pryce during an 80 m hurdles run on 6 September 1964

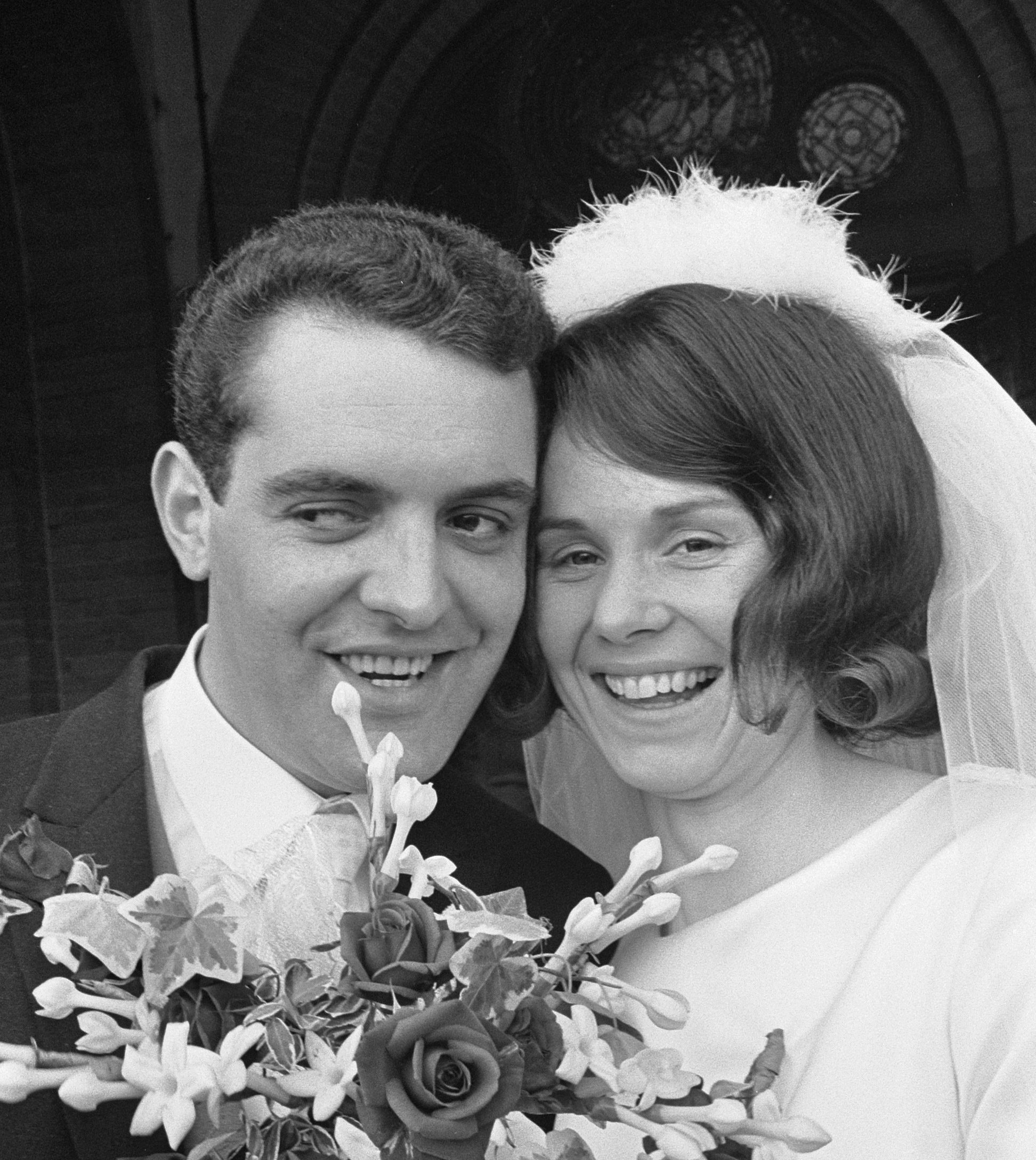
Lia Hinten marrying W. Louer on 22 April 1966

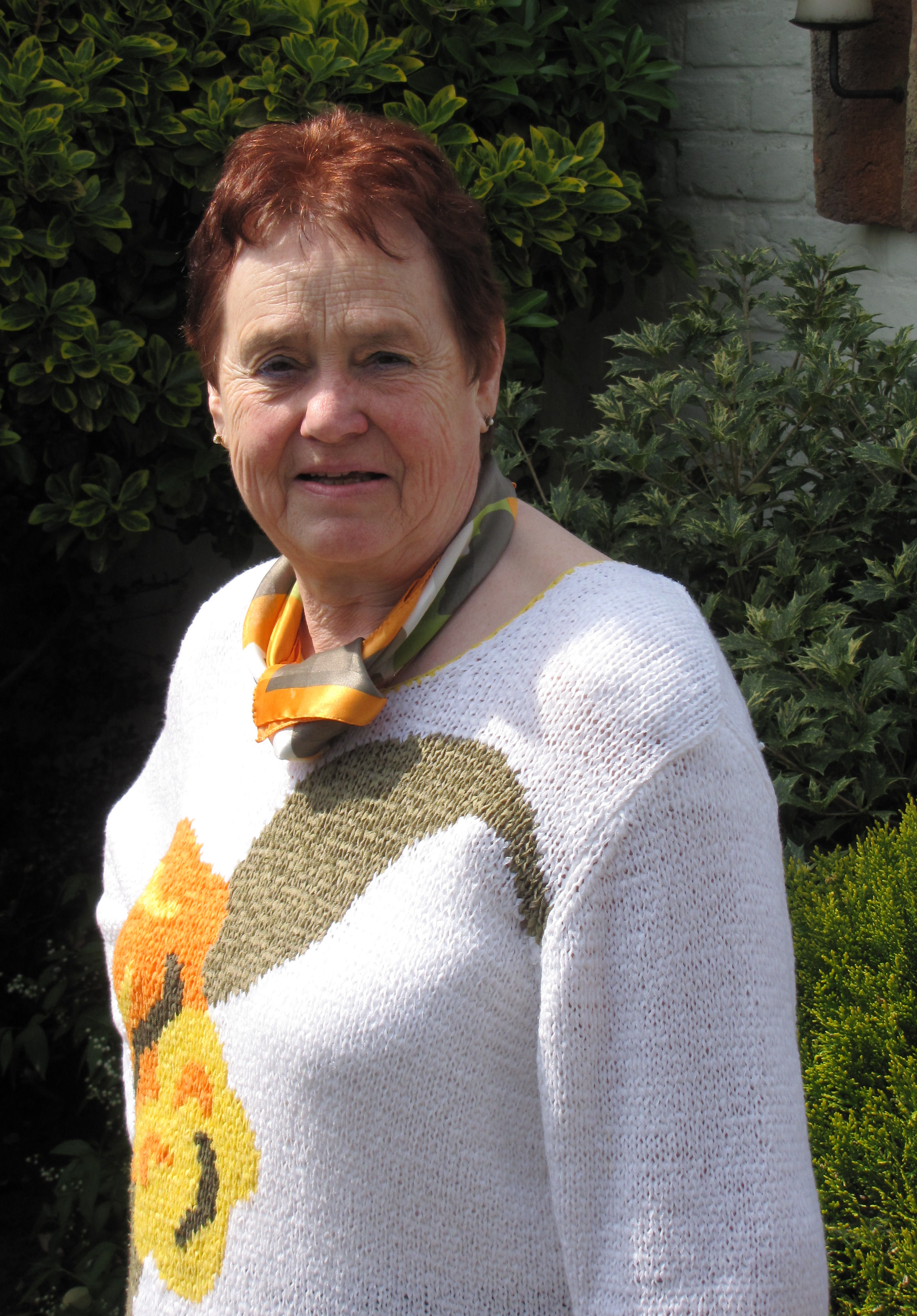
Lia Hinten in 2010

Awards
Preceded by Gerda Kraan	KNAU Cup; 1963	Succeeded by Tilly van der Made
