= Esther Stroy =

American sprinter (born 1953)

Achievements and titles
- Personal bests: 100 m: 11.5 s (1972) 200 m: 23.4 s (1972) 400 m: 53.5 s (1968)
Medal record
Women's athletics
Representing United States
1971 Pan American Games
Gold medal – first place	1971 Cali	4×100 m relay
Bronze medal – third place	1971 Cali	200 m

Esther Stroy (born August 12, 1953) is a former American track and field athlete, who competed in the sprinting events. She is best known for competing at the 1968 Olympics in the 400-meter dash as a 15-year-old, the youngest competitor at those games.

== Track career ==
Esther Stroy was only 15 years and 64 days old when she competed at the 1968 Olympics.

In 2012, Stroy, now Esther Stroy-Harper, remembered it as being "more than the world's best summer vacation. It was the opportunity of a lifetime".

In the 400 m event itself, she reached the semi-final but injured herself whilst leading the race and finally finished fifth so therefore not qualifying for the final. Her Olympic misfortune was repeated in 1972. As Stroy-Harper recalls “Right before the 1972 Olympics, I injured that same hamstring, so I didn't make the team. I went to Munich, but as a spectator.”

In the 1968 United States Olympic Trials, Stroy was third in the 400 m event and was entered but did not compete in the 200 m. In 1972, she was third in her heat of the 200 m and was entered but did not compete in the 400 m.

Between the two Olympics, she continued running for her universities and country.

The high point of her career was winning gold at the 1971 Pan American Games in the 4 x 400 meter relay and bronze in the 200 meters. She also won the 220 yards dash at the 1971 and 1972 AAU Indoor Championships.

In 1971, she was a member of a 4 x 1-mile women's relay team that set a new world record at a USA versus Pan-Africa meet.

In 1969, she was ranked second in the US and ninth in the world in the 400 metres/440 yards by the votes of the experts of Track and Field News.

== Personal life ==
Stroy was the eighth of eleven children of Mr and Mrs Dennis Stroy. Her father was a cab driver in the District of Columbia.

Esther Stroy attended Nevelle Thomas Elementary School then Spingarn High School, Washington D.C.

Stroy also joined a neighbourhood track club. Here she came under the tutelage of Brooks Johnson, now one of America's best known track coaches but at that time he was still a relative novice coach. She was to become Brook's first of many Olympians.

Her father was able to see her run in Mexico City in the 1968 Olympics, but her mother unfortunately was not able to having injured herself during the preparations to travel. Being of high school age, Stroy attended classes at a local school during the six weeks of the Olympics training camp at Los Alamos, New Mexico in order to maintain her academic skills.

Stroy attended Howard University after graduating from Spingarn. After Howard, she attended Stanford University where she began her career as a coach and a recruiter. She worked in California for several years before returning to Washington D.C. In Washington, she continued working as a coach, mainly working with young athletes aged 8 to 17/18.

Stroy is married to Daniel Harper, a retired United States Army colonel, and now uses the surname Stroy-Harper.
