= Natalya Pechonkina =

Soviet sprinter

Personal information
- Born: 15 July 1946 (age 79) Yuzhno-Sakhalinsk, Soviet Union

Sport
- Sport: Track and field
Medal record
Representing Soviet Union
Olympic Games
Bronze medal – third place	1968 Mexico City	400 m
European Championships
Bronze medal – third place	1971 Helsinki	4×400 m
European Indoor Championships
Gold medal – first place	1971 Sofia	4×200 m
Silver medal – second place	1972 Grenoble	4×360 m

Natalya Pechonkina (née Burda, later Chistyakova,Russian: Наталья Печёнкина (Бурда, Чистякова); born July 15, 1946) is a Soviet athlete who competed mainly in the 400 metres.

Under maiden name Burda, she began athletics in Saratov, coached by B.Kolokolov. She received the title Master of Sports of the USSR, International Class in 1967 and competed for the USSR in the 1968 Summer Olympics held in Mexico City in the 400 metres where she won the bronze medal.

She is the mother of pole vaulter Viktor Chistiakov and the grandmother of Australian pole vaulters Liz Parnov and Vicky Parnov.
