= Tim Boyle (Australian footballer) =

Australian rules footballer (born 1984)

Personal information
- Born: 28 January 1984 (age 42)
- Original team: Geelong Falcons (TAC Cup)
- Draft: No. 51, 2002 national draft
- Debut: Round 13, 2005, Hawthorn vs. Port Adelaide, at AAMI Stadium
- Height: 193 cm (6 ft 4 in)
- Weight: 95 kg (209 lb)

Playing career^{1}
Years	Club	Games (Goals)
2003–2009	Hawthorn	31 (39)
- ^{1} Playing statistics correct to the end of 2009.

Tim Boyle (born 28 January 1984) is a former Australian rules football player who played with the Hawthorn Football Club in the Australian Football League. His career was plagued by injuries.

Originally from Leopold Football Club and the Geelong Falcons, Boyle attended Bellarine Secondary College and was drafted by Hawthorn at the 2002 AFL draft. In 2004 he broke his leg in a freak pre-season training drill injury, and in 2005 a torn hamstring limited him to just three games. In 2006 Boyle again struggled to feature, managing just two senior games.

Boyle performed better in 2007, playing 20 games and kicking 32 goals as a "third tall" forward. A hamstring injury reduced his effectiveness in the latter part of the season.

Boyle started 2008 solidly, kicking 2 goals in each of the first 2 rounds. He played as a neat and valuable foil for Lance Franklin and Jarryd Roughead in a triple-prong Hawthorn forward line. Clean hands and accurate kicking were hallmarks of Boyle's game, though his leisurely demeanour and playing style limited his level of physical presence in contests.

Boyle ruptured his anterior cruciate ligament on his right knee playing for the Hawks’ VFL side in May 2009. He had kicked four goals and fell awkwardly to the ground after taking a mark at the start of the fourth quarter. Boyle missed the rest of the season.

Boyle announced his retirement at the end of the 2009 season, due to a number of injuries over his career.

His father is Stephen Boyle, who played six games for Footscray Football Club in 1972 before losing sight in one eye in a freak accident on the field.

== Statistics ==
Legend
G	Goals	K	Kicks	D	Disposals	T	Tackles
B	Behinds	H	Handballs	M	Marks

Season	Team	No.	Games	Totals							Averages (per game)							Votes
Season	Team	No.	Games	G	B	K	H	D	M	T	G	B	K	H	D	M	T	Votes
2003	Hawthorn	36	0	—	—	—	—	—	—	—	—	—	—	—	—	—	—	0
2004	Hawthorn	36	0	—	—	—	—	—	—	—	—	—	—	—	—	—	—	0
2005	Hawthorn	36	3	1	2	17	13	30	15	2	0.3	0.7	5.7	4.3	10.0	5.0	0.7	0
2006	Hawthorn	20	2	0	1	6	5	11	7	3	0.0	0.5	3.0	2.5	5.5	3.5	1.5	0
2007	Hawthorn	20	20	32	25	108	67	175	82	25	1.6	1.3	5.4	3.4	8.8	4.1	1.3	0
2008	Hawthorn	20	6	6	4	31	21	52	20	4	1.0	0.7	5.2	3.5	8.7	3.3	0.7	0
2009	Hawthorn	20	0	—	—	—	—	—	—	—	—	—	—	—	—	—	—	0
Career			31	39	32	162	106	268	124	34	1.3	1.0	5.2	3.4	8.6	4.0	1.1	0
