= Monique Noirot =

French sprinter

Personal information
- Nationality: France
- Born: 10 October 1941 (age 85) Talence

Sport
- Events: 200 m, 400 m
- Club: ASPTT Bordeaux
Medal record
Women's athletics
Representing France
European Championships
Bronze medal – third place	1966 Budapest	400 m

Monique Noirot, née Monique Wideman, (pronounced [mɔnik nwaʁo]; 10 October 1941 at Talence) is a former French athlete who specialised in the 400 meters.

== Biography ==
Monique distinguished herself in the 1966 European Championships at Budapest winning the bronze medal in the 400 meters with a time of 54.0s. Selected for 1968 Summer Olympics, Monique Noirot was eliminated in the semi-final round of the 400 meters won two days later by her compatriot Colette Besson.

Running for team ASPTT Bordeaux, Monique Noirot won four national titles (200m in 1964, 400 m from 1965 to 1967) and improved five times the record of France's 400 meters. Her personal best was 53.1s, established during the 1967 season.

She is the mother of Olivier Noirot, multiple champion of France and former national record holder in the 400 meters.

== prize list ==
Year	Competition	Location	Place	Event
1966	1966 European Athletics Championships	Budapest	3rd	400 m
