= Helga Henning =

German sprinter (1937–2018)

Personal information
- Nationality: German
- Born: 11 November 1937 Laatzen, Germany
- Died: 11 December 2018 (aged 81)

Sport
- Sport: Sprinting
- Event: 400 metres

Helga Henning (11 November 1937 – 11 December 2018) was a German sprinter. She competed in the women's 400 metres at the 1968 Summer Olympics representing West Germany.
