= Antónia Munkácsi =

Hungarian sprinter (born 1938)

Personal information
- Nationality: Hungarian
- Born: 26 November 1938 (age 87) Belgrade, Yugoslavia

Sport
- Sport: Sprinting
- Event: 200 metres
Medal record
Women's athletics
Representing Hungary
European Championships
Silver medal – second place	1966 Budapest	400 m

Antónia Munkácsi (born 26 November 1938) is a Hungarian sprinter. She competed in the women's 200 metres at the 1960 Summer Olympics.
