= SoFo =

Area of Södermalm in Stockholm, Sweden

Coordinates: 59°18′49″N 18°4′49″E

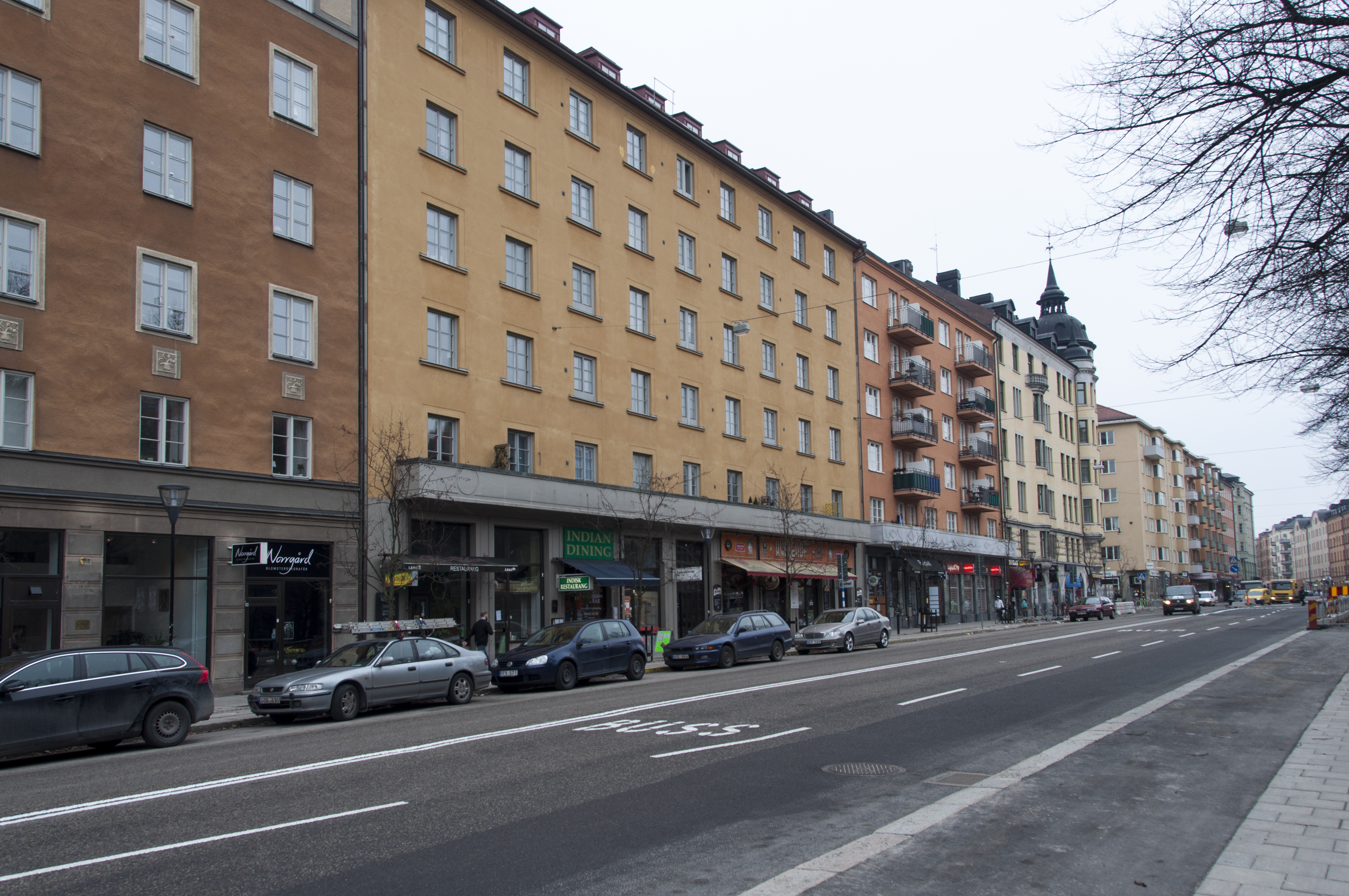
Folkungagatan street, forming the northern edge of SoFo.

The area SoFo, or "South of Folkungagatan" is located in Södermalm, a district of Stockholm, Sweden. It is bounded by Folkungagatan street to the north, Ringvägen to the south and in the east and west by Erstagatan and Götgatan, respectively.

The name SoFo is a pun on SoHo, the districts in London and Manhattan, and is an invention of local entrepreneurs who since 2003 have attempted to rebrand the area as a centre of creative and innovative Swedish fashion and retailing. In particular, many Swedish fashion designers are located in SoFo.

SoFo is home to many other creative industries in Stockholm, including advertising agencies, media companies and publishers.

The name "Sofo" is primarily used by so-called hipsters and people in the creative industry. The name has been debated as a creation of the wishes of a group of people, although the area is essentially unchanged.

Other local places of interest include Nytorget, a city square with a playground and small park and Vita Bergen, a larger park with good views over Stockholm. Vita Bergen also has an open-air theatre which has music and dance performances during summer, and offers steep tobogganing in winter.

SoFo is accessible via Medborgarplatsen and Skanstull metro stations.

== SoFo events ==
The last Thursday of every month is called SoFo night, where retailers are open until 9pm and offer free entertainment and refreshments to shoppers. Many stores provide live music and a vibrant atmosphere.
