= Söder =

Söder means South. It may also refer to:

== Places in Sweden ==
- Södermalm, a major district of central Stockholm
- Söder, Malmö
- Södermanland
- Södertörn
- Söderhamn Municipality
- Söderköping Municipality
- Södertälje Municipality

== Places in Finland ==
- Söderkulla, a village in the municipality of Sipoo

== People with the surname ==
- Björn Söder, Swedish MP
- Karin Söder, Swedish statesman
- Larry Söder, Swedish MP
- Markus Söder, German politician
- Robin Söder, Swedish footballer

== Other uses ==
- Soder Airlines
- Söder tea

== See also ==
- Solder, a material used to bond metal pieces
