= Liberati =

Liberati was a political network founded in Sweden in July 2008. The network was formed in reaction to the controversial passing in June 2008 by the Swedish Parliament, of the so-called FRA Law, a law allowing the National Defence Radio Establishment (Sweden), the national signals intelligence agency, to tap all internet traffic passing in or out of the country, across the national borders. Liberati was initiated by Alexander Bard and Jan Söderqvist and uses various internet social fora to try to influence the traditional political parties, from Libertarianism at one end via pragmatic Liberalism to liberal Socialism at the other end of the spectrum.

The group resisted early calls for Liberati to extend the network towards the formation of a separate political party. In addition to Bard and Söderqvist, early members associated with the Liberati movement include political scientist Stig-Björn Ljunggren, author and columnist Oscar Swartz and Member of Parliament Camilla Lindberg, an outspoken opponent to the FRA law from within the Swedish Liberal Party, and a leader of the anti-FRA law movement after Lindberg became the only representative of the ruling Swedish Center-Right coalition to vote against the FRA law in the parliamentary vote of June 2008.

On 26 September 2010 Liberati was disbanded and replaced with both a cross-party liberal network simply called Liberala Nätverket (The Liberal Network), and a new party, Liberaldemokraterna (The Liberal Democrats).

== Sources ==
- Arvidsson, Johan; Eklöf, Aaron (21 February 2009). "Så ska Bards elit förändra folkpartiet". Nyheter24 (in Swedish). Archived from the original on 1 April 2009.
- Söderqvist, Jan; et al. (8 November 2008). "Detta är Liberati – fem punkter". Expressen (in Swedish). Archived from the original on 3 January 2017.
- Bard, Alexander. "Därför lägger vi ner Liberati – Leve Liberala Nätverket!" (in Swedish). Archived from the original on 25 May 2012.
