= Folkungagatan =

Street in Södermalm, Stockholm, Sweden

Coordinates: 59°18′53.27″N 18°05′49.14″E

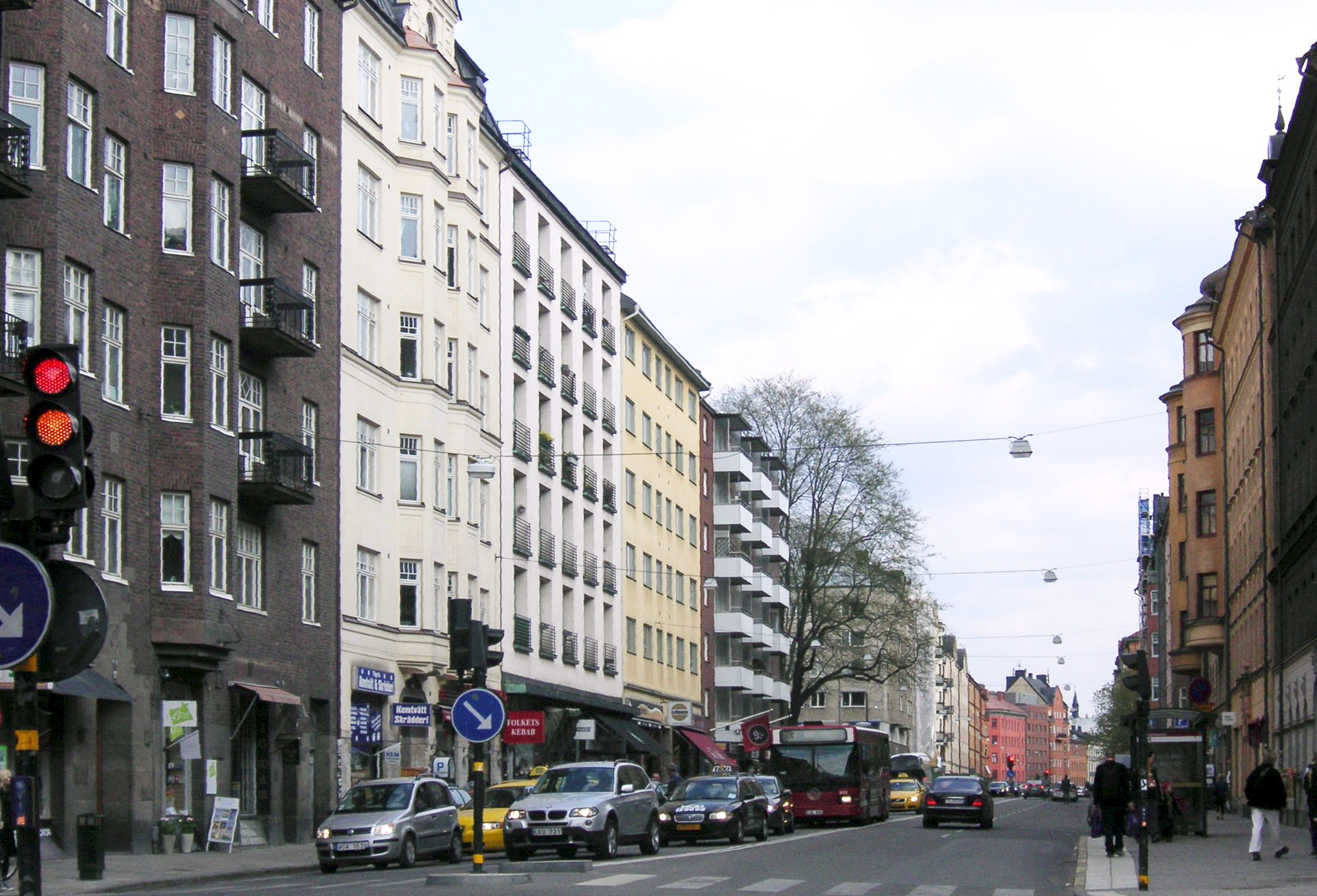
Folkungagatan looking east.

Folkungagatan is a major thoroughfare and business street located at Södermalm in Stockholm, Sweden. The street runs between Söderledstunneln and Danviksbro. The street was named in 1885 and refers to the medieval House of Folkung.

SoFo (short for "South of Folkungagatan") is an area located to the south of the street.

== See also ==
- SoFo
