= Bahnhof =

Swedish internet service provider

Bahnhof AB
- Company type: Aktiebolag
- Genre: Internet service provider
- Founded: 1994
- Founder: Oscar Swartz
- Headquarters: Tunnelgatan 2, 111 37, Stockholm, Sweden
- Key people: Jon Karlung (CEO); Andreas Norman (COB)
- Products: Internet service provider
- Revenue: 825,165,000 SEK (2016)
- Number of employees: 199
- ASN: 8473
- Peering policy: Selective
- Traffic Levels: 1–5 Tbps
- Website: bahnhof.se bahnhof.cloud

Bahnhof (German for "railway station") is a Swedish Internet service provider (ISP) founded in 1994 by Oscar Swartz in Uppsala, Sweden, and is the country's first independent ISP. Today the company is represented in Stockholm, Gothenburg, Uppsala, Borlänge, Malmö and Umeå. The company is listed on Nasdaq First North.

WikiLeaks used to be hosted in a Bahnhof data center inside the ultra-secure bunker Pionen, which is buried inside the White Mountains in Stockholm.

== History ==
Bahnhof was founded in 1994 by Oscar Swartz. It was one of Sweden's first ISPs. The company is publicly traded since December 2007 under the name BAHN-B (Aktietorget). On 11 September 2008, Bahnhof opened a new computer center inside the former civil defence center Pionen in the White Mountains in Stockholm, Sweden.

After WikiLeaks was kicked off of Amazon Web Services in December 2010 after the Afghan War documents leak, it bought server space from Bahnhof, as its chairman Jon Karlung said in press interviews. Wikileaks later changed providers again and Bahnhof auctioned off the servers that previously housed Wikileaks.

== Government response ==
On 10 March 2005, the Swedish police confiscated four servers placed in the Bahnhof premises, hoping to find copyrighted material. Although these servers were located near Bahnhof's server park (in a network lab area) the company claimed they were not their property since they had been privately purchased by staff. They further presented evidence showing the material on these servers had been planted there by someone hired by Svenska Antipiratbyrån, a Swedish anti-copyright infringement organisation.

In 2009, Bahnhof generated controversy by failing to store the IP addresses of customers, in order to defeat the Swedish government's new laws on illegal file-sharing, transposing the EU IPRED regulations, which enabled ISPs to retain data longer than the data protection regulations would allow, in order for them to be available on police request.

In April 2014, the CJEU struck down the Data Retention Directive. PTS, Sweden's telecommunications regulator, told Swedish ISPs and telcos that they would no longer have to retain call records and internet metadata. However, after two government investigations found that Sweden's data retention law did not break its obligations to the European Convention on Human Rights, the PTS reversed course. Most of Sweden's major telecommunications companies complied immediately, though Tele2 lodged an unsuccessful appeal. Bahnhof was the one holdout and it was given an order to comply by a 24 November deadline or face a five million kronor ($680,000) fine. In response Bahnhof offered all their customers a free VPN service.

In October 2018, Elsevier secured a court order that required Swedish ISPs to block access to Sci-Hub websites. While complying with the order, Bahnhof redirected its customers who tried to access the Elsevier website to a page where Bahnhof criticizes Elsevier and its lawsuit as censorship and working against open and fair access to information and science.
