= Katarina Church =

Church in Stockholm, Sweden

Katarina kyrka
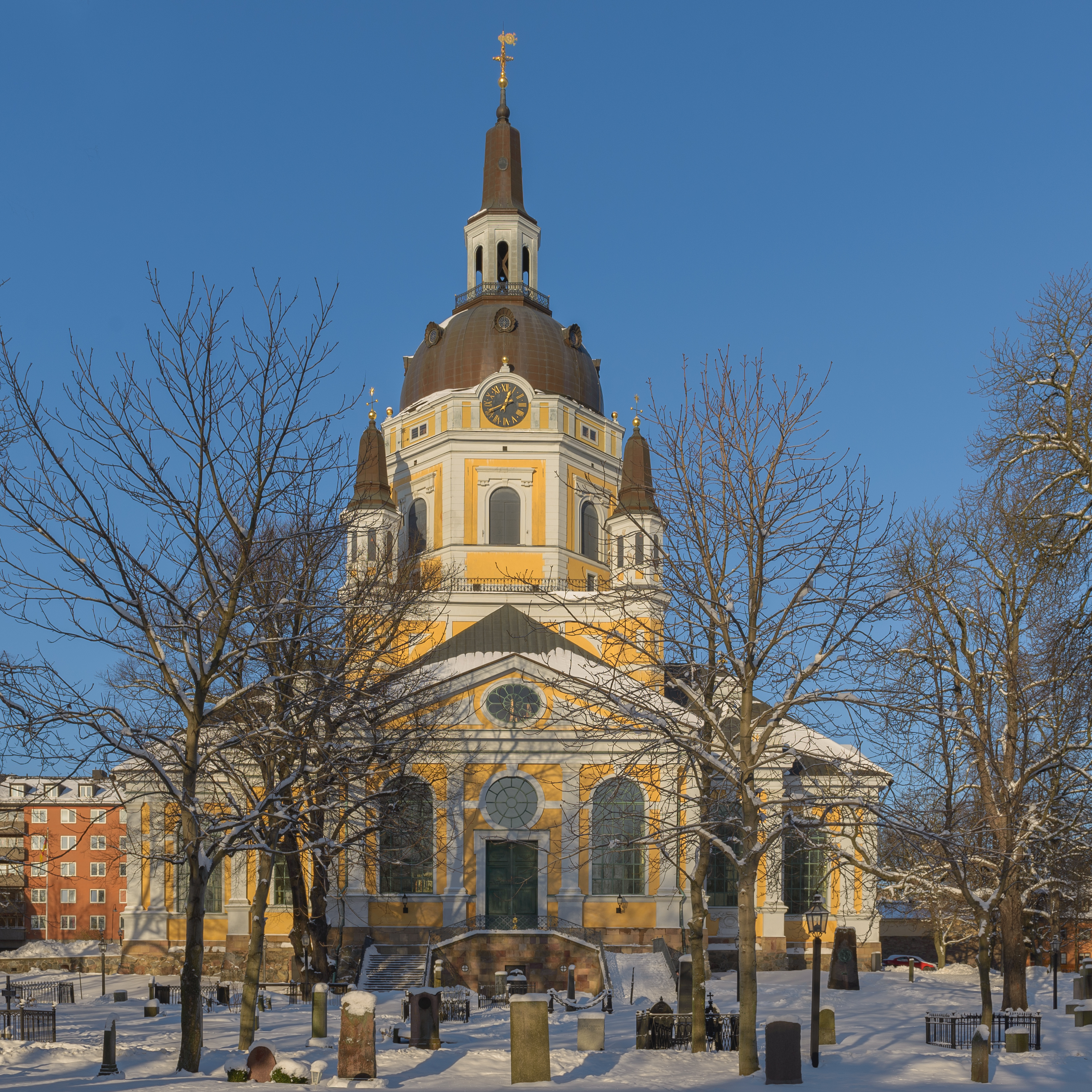
- January 2013 view of Katarina kyrka from outside

Religion
- Affiliation: Church of Sweden
- Rite: Lutheran
- Ecclesiastical or organizational status: Parish church
- Year consecrated: 1724

Location
- Location: Stockholm, Sweden
- Interactive map of Katarina kyrka
- Coordinates: 59°19′01″N 18°04′41″E

Architecture
- Style: Baroque
- Groundbreaking: 1656
- Completed: 1695

Katarina kyrka (Church of Catherine) is a church in central Stockholm, Sweden. The original building was constructed 1656–1695. It has been rebuilt twice after being destroyed by fires, the second time in the 1990s. The Katarina-Sofia borough is named after Katarina Parish and the neighbouring parish of Sofia.

Construction of the church started during the reign of Charles X Gustav of Sweden, and the church is named after Princess Catherine, mother of the king, wife of John Casimir, Palsgrave of Pfalz-Zweibrücken and half-sister of Gustavus Adolphus. The original architect was Jean de la Vallée.

In 1723 the church was completely destroyed in a major fire. It was rebuilt with a larger, octagonal tower.

On 17 May 1990, the church burned down again, leaving almost nothing remaining but the external walls. A rebuilt church reopened in 1995 with a new organ built by J. L. van den Heuvel Orgelbouw.

Notable people buried in the cemetery surrounding the church include the assassinated Foreign Minister Anna Lindh, the Dutch-Swedish singer Cornelis Vreeswijk, football player Sven Bergqvist, rapper Einár, and Sten Sture the Elder.

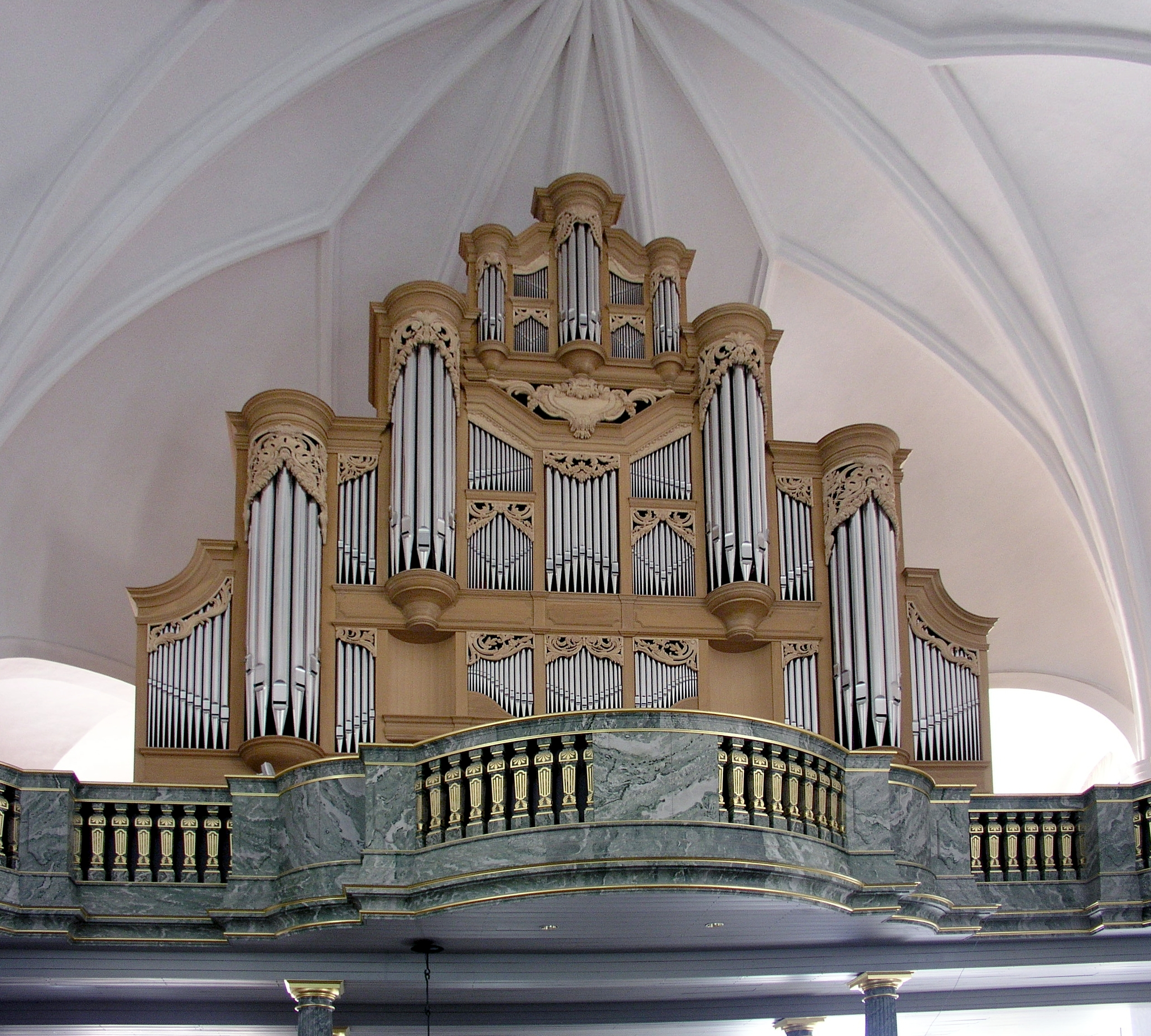
The van den Heuvel pipe organ

== See also ==
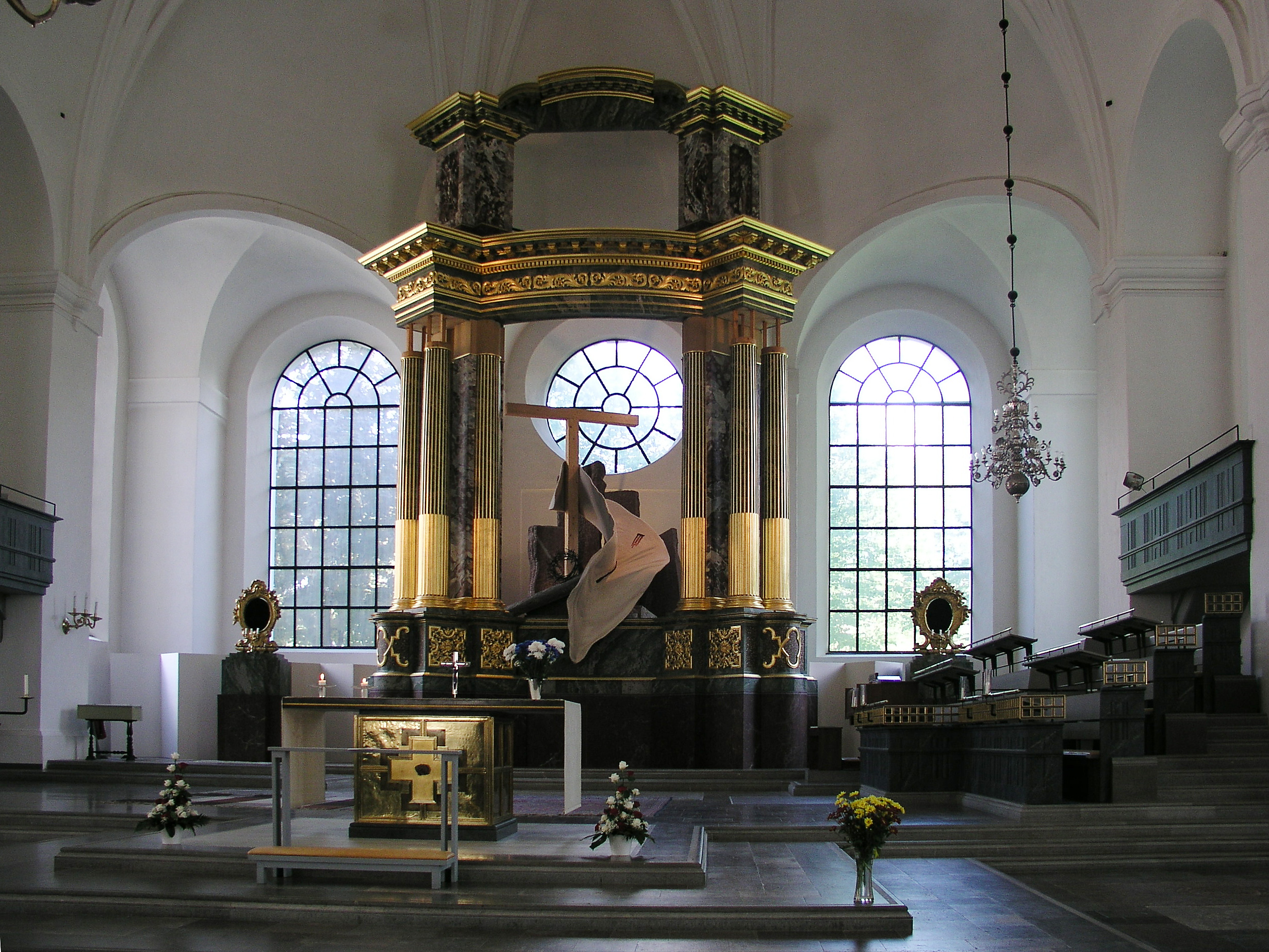
The new altar

- List of churches in Stockholm
