= Mosebacke =

Square in Södermalm, Stockholm, Sweden

Coordinates: 59°19′05″N 18°04′28″E

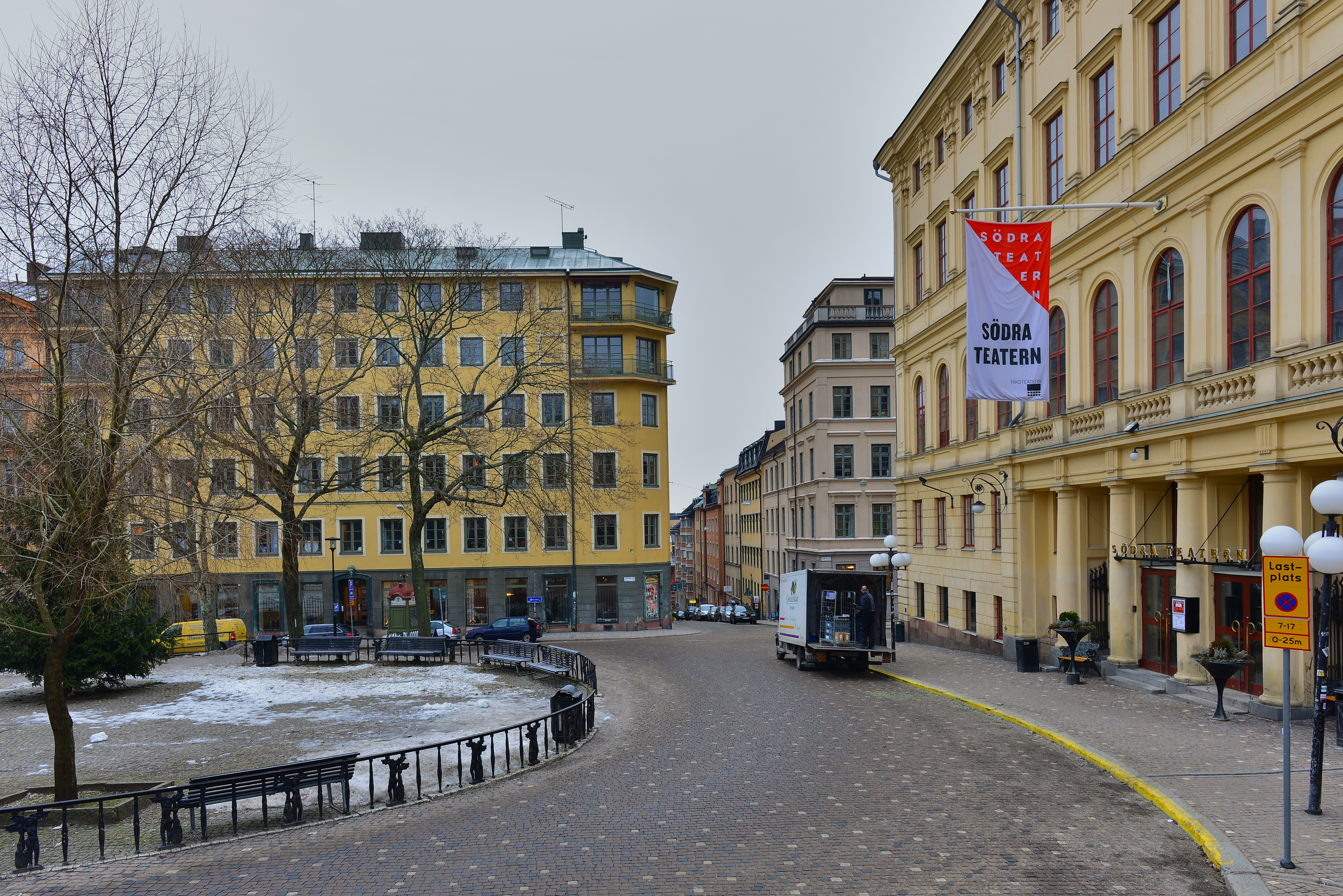
Mosebacke torg. January 2013

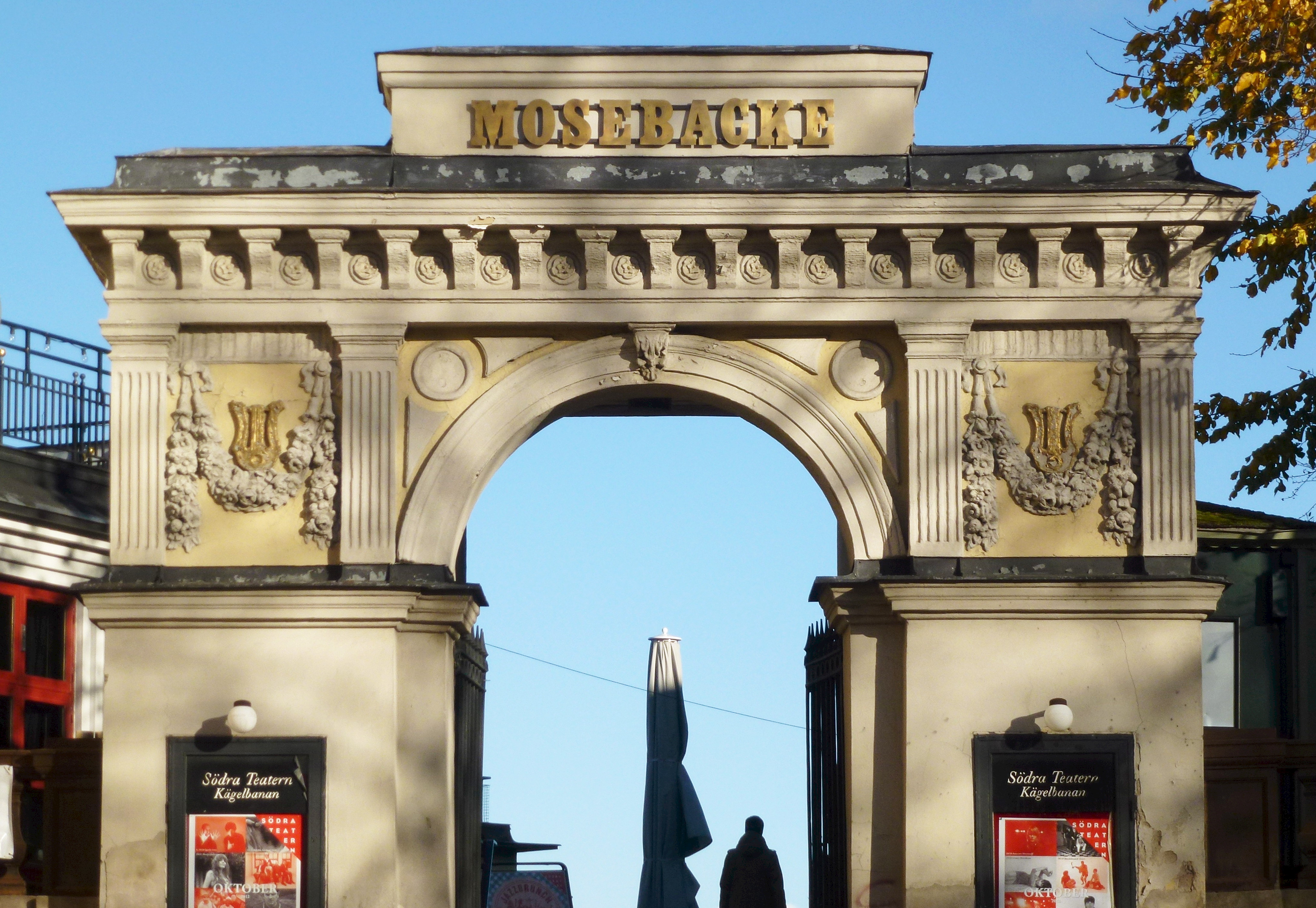
Mosebacke portal

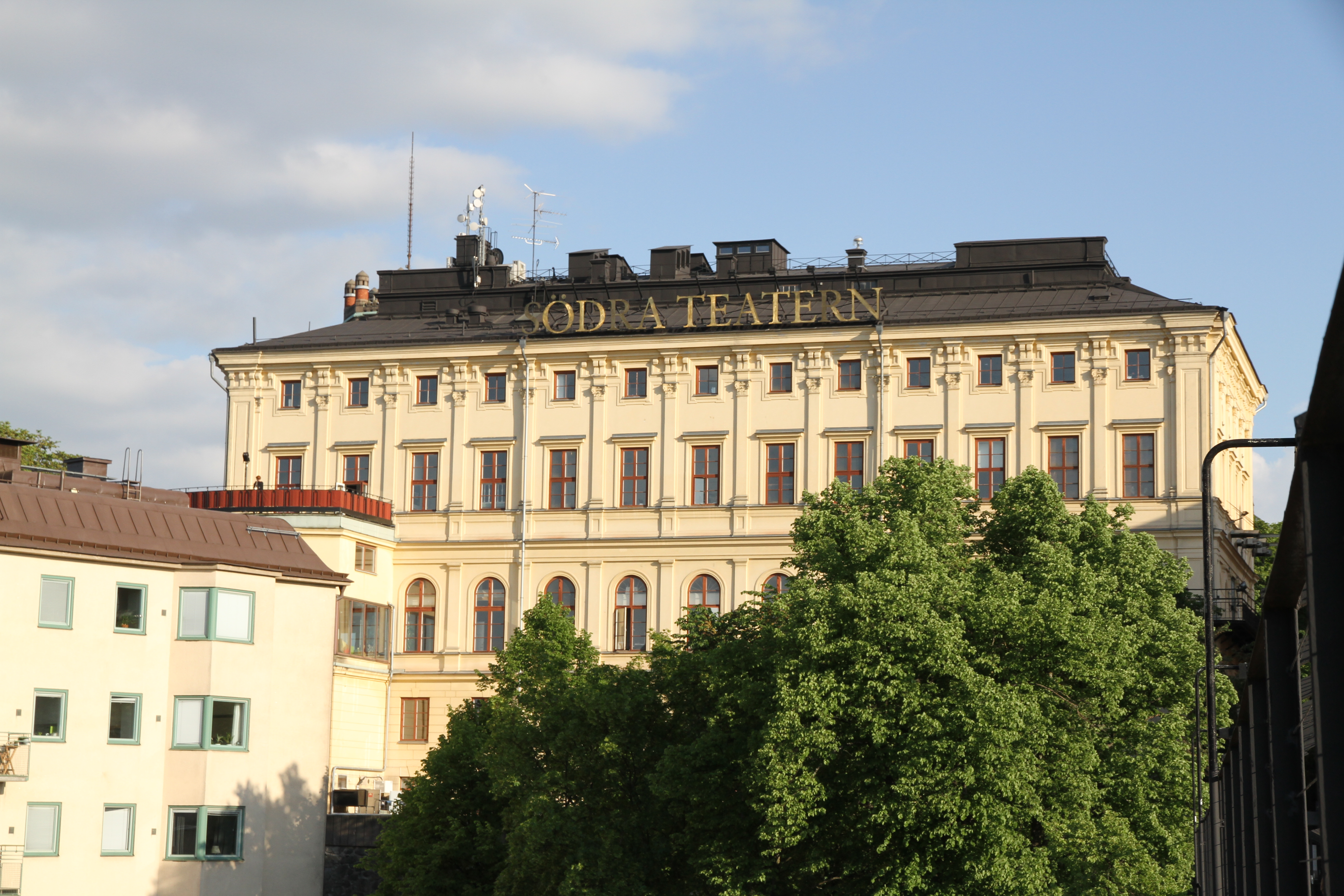
Sodra Teatern

Mosebacke (Mosebacke torg) is a square and park situated on Södermalm in Stockholm, Sweden.

== History ==
The park's first plantings took place during 1852–1853. The square and the surrounding neighborhood of Mosebacke were created after the Mosebacke area was hit by an extensive fire in 1857, when many properties there burned to the ground. The park was remodeled in 1941 when it received its current look.

Since the 18th century, the site has been known for venues where cultural events take place. It is the site of Stockholm's oldest private theatre, Södra teatern. The current theater was designed by architect Johan Fredrik Åbom (1817-1900) and was inaugurated in 1859. There are also restaurants, an outdoor terrace and stages where local celebrities like Cornelis Vreeswijk (1937–1987) have performed.

== Other sources ==
- Fogelström, Per Anders (1995) Ur det försvunna - stockholmska spår och tecken (Stockholm: Bonniers Förlag) ISBN 91-0-056123-1
- Hasselblad, Björn; Lindström, Frans (1979) Stockholmskvarter: vad kvartersnamnen berättar (Stockholm: AWE/Geber) ISBN 91-20-06252-4
