= Högalid Church =

- Högalidskyrkan
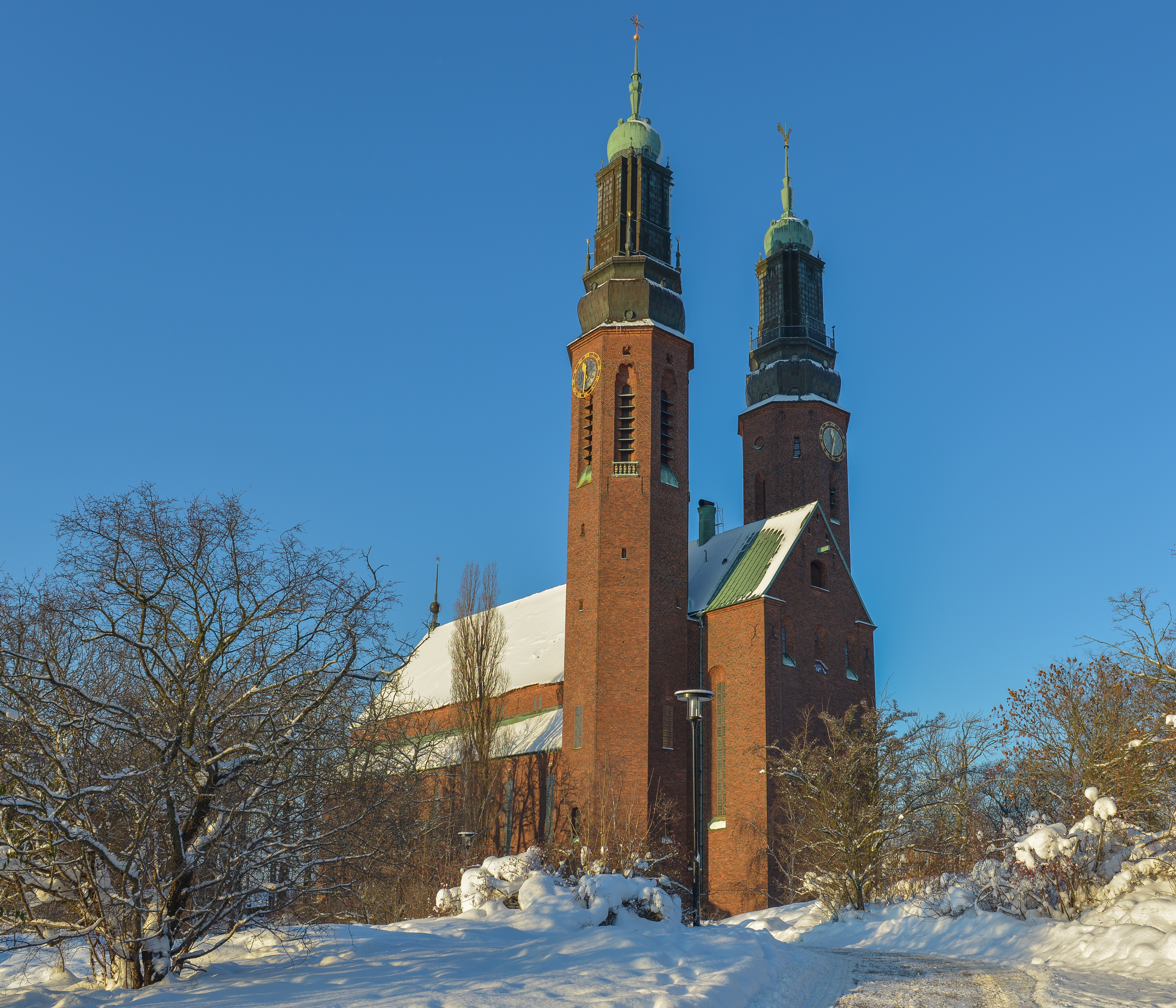
- Högalid Church
- Högalid Church
- 59°19′03″N 18°02′15″E
- Location: Södermalm, Stockholm
- Country: Sweden
- Denomination: Lutheran, Church of Sweden
- Website: hogalid.se

History
- Consecrated: 10 June 1923

Architecture
- Architect: Ivar Tengbom
- Style: National Romantic style
- Years built: 1916–1923
- Completed: 1923

Administration
- Diocese: Diocese of Stockholm
- Parish: Högalid Parish

Högalid Church (Swedish: Högalidskyrkan) is a protected church located in the Södermalm district of Stockholm, Sweden. It was designed by architect Ivar Tengbom. Built upon elevated ground 1916–1923, in a barren area later turned into a park, it is one of the most prominent buildings in the city, complementing the contemporary Stockholm City Hall on the opposite side of Riddarfjärden. The church is considered one of Sweden's foremost examples of the National Romantic architectural style.

The church features numerous renowned artworks, including the largest crucifix in Scandinavia, sculpted by Gunnar Torhamn. Torhamn also painted frescoes in the church's baptistry and sculpted decorations for the chancel and organ. The retable was sculpted in a neo-Byzantine style by Erik Jerke. It also holds some artifacts older than the church itself, including a 16th-century baptismal font and a pair of 18th-century altar candelabras.

The church is complemented by a community hall and parsonage also designed by Tengbom and a columbarium dating to 1939. The church's graveyard contains a chapel of its own, decorated with mosaics by Einar Forseth.

== Gallery ==
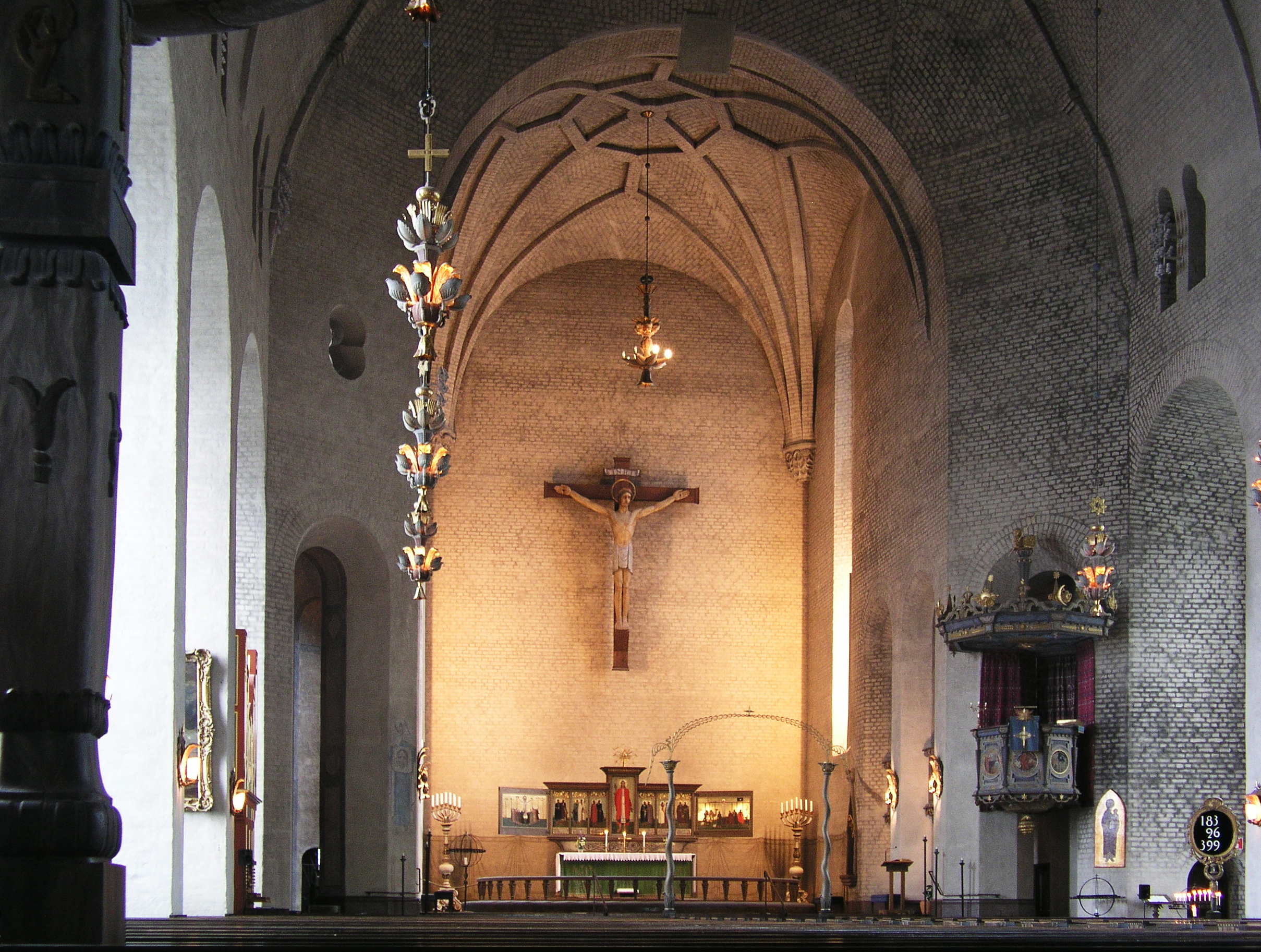
A view of the chancel at Högalid Church

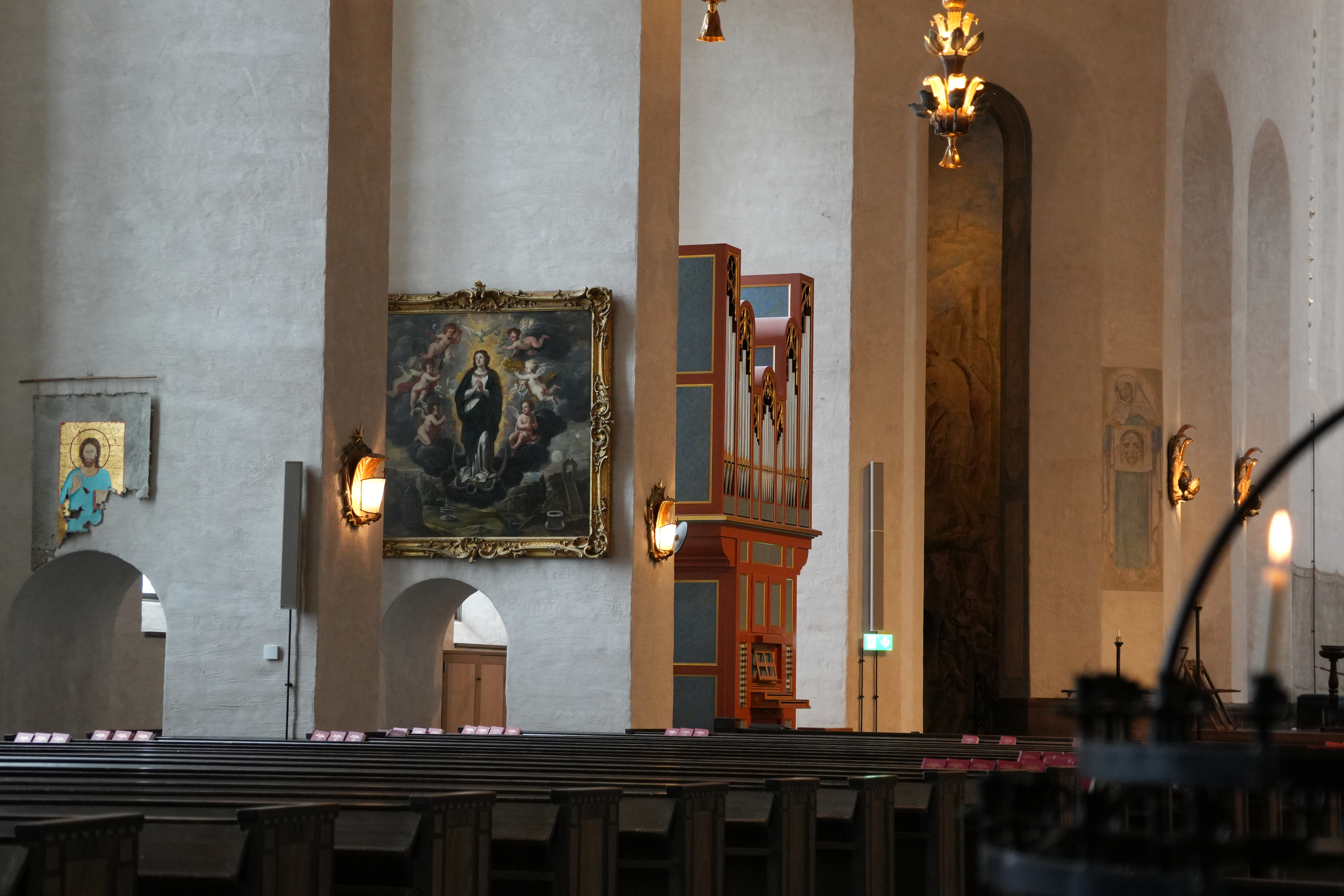
A painting of the Assumption of the Blessed Virgin Mary at Högalid Church

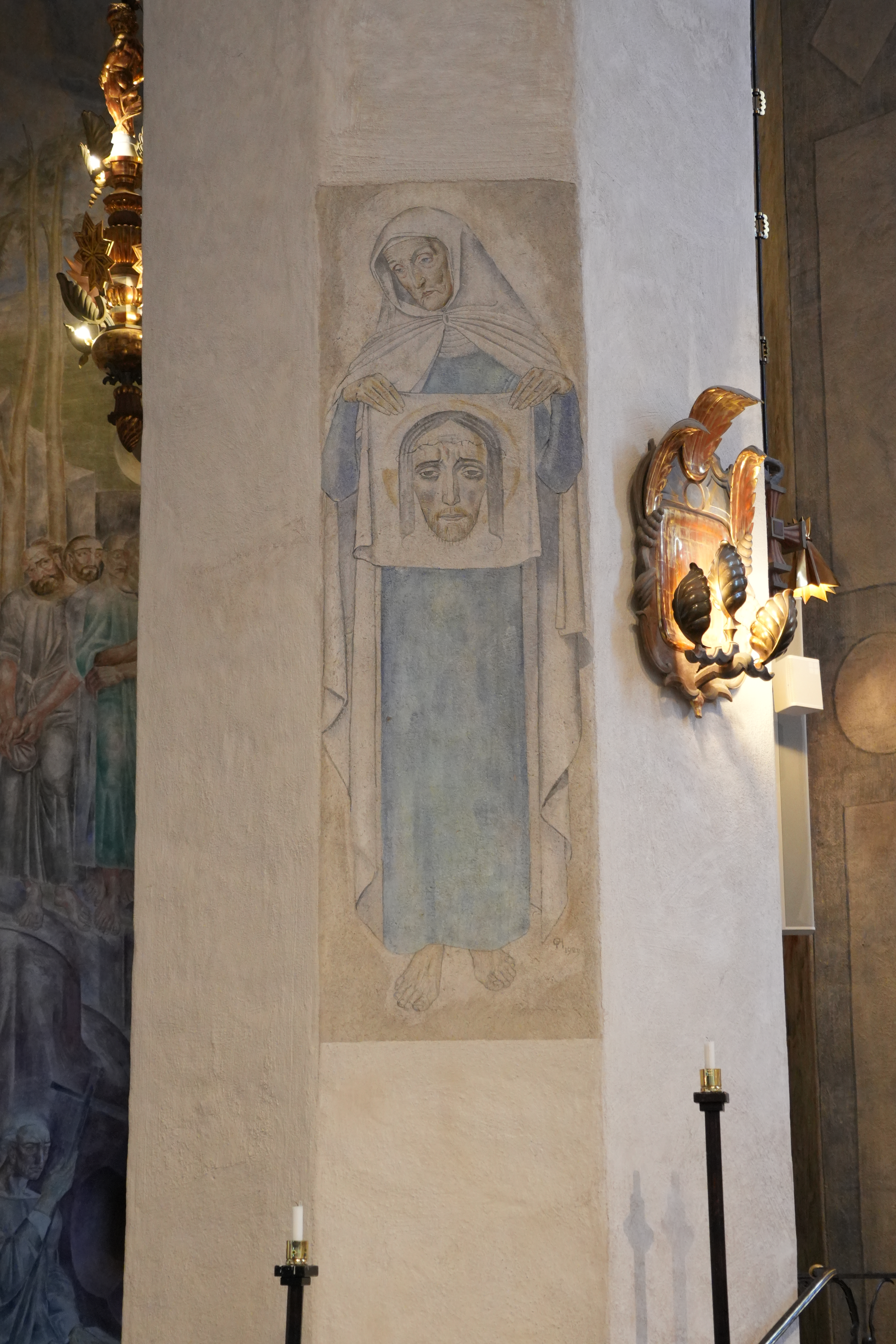
A painting of the Veil of Veronica at Högalid Church

== See also ==
- List of churches in Stockholm
