= Södra Teatern =

Theatre in Södermalm, Stockholm, Sweden

Coordinates: 59°19′06″N 18°04′27″E

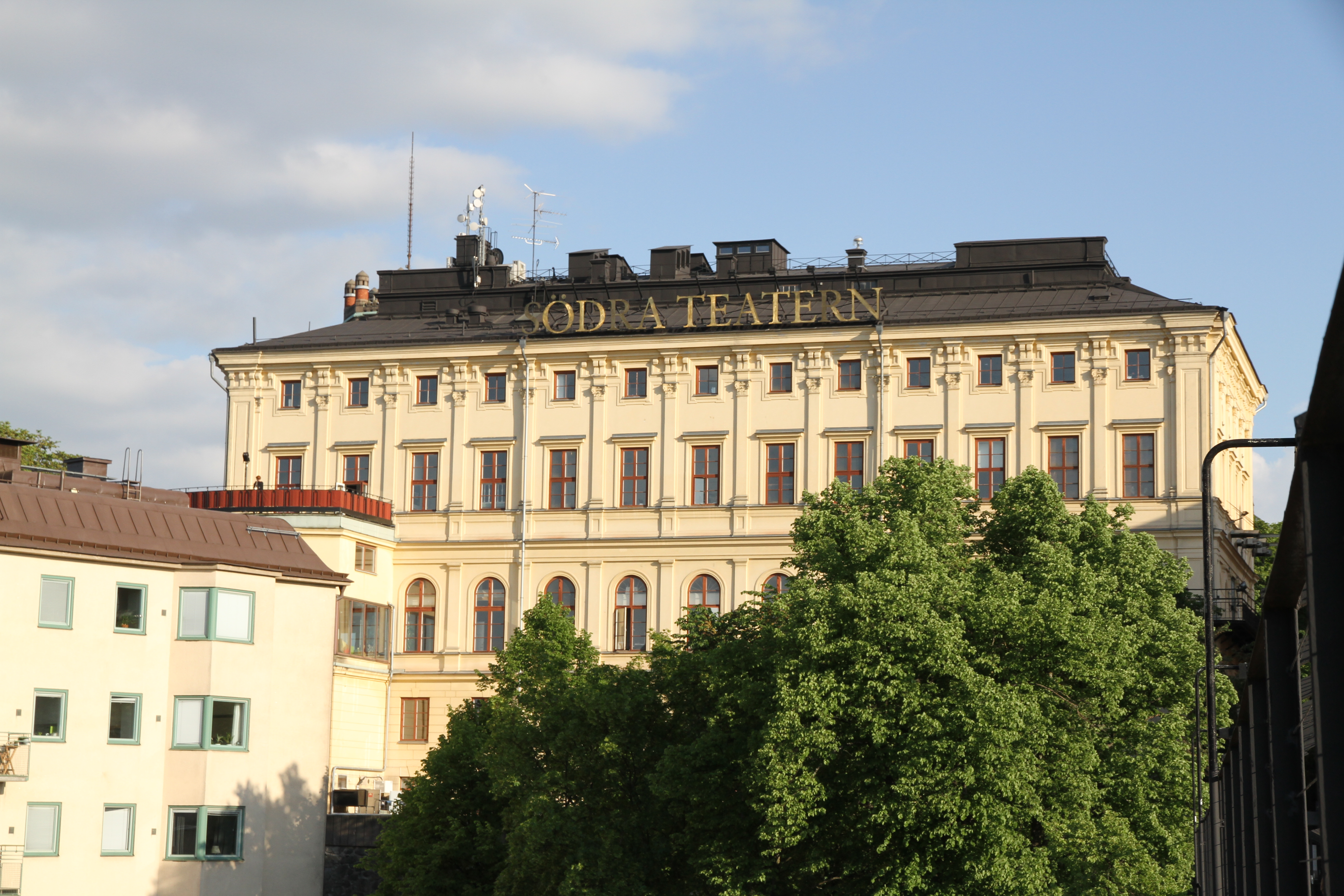
Södra Teatern

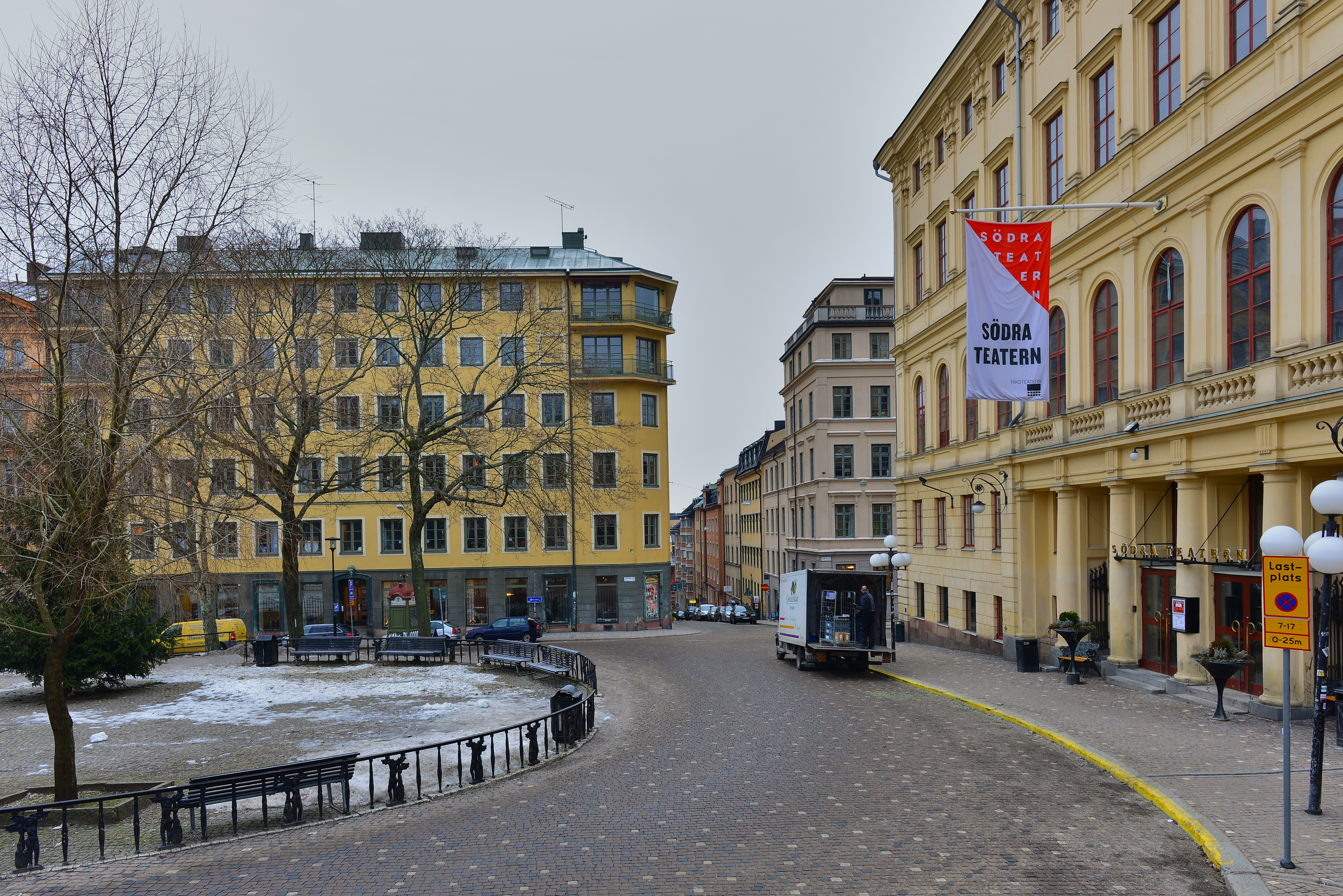
Södra Teatern on Mosebacke torg

Södra Teatern is a theatre in Stockholm, Sweden. It is located at Mosebacke torg on Södermalm in Stockholm. The venue is the oldest theatre in Stockholm and is situated in the heart of the city.

== History ==
Södra Teatern is one of Sweden's oldest active theatres. The current theatre was designed by architect Johan Fredrik Åbom (1817-1900) and was inaugurated in 1859. It has two restaurants, outdoor terraces and seven stages. The building also consists of five bars and the Mosebacke Etablissement restaurant. Stora Scen is the main stage. Mosebacketerrassen is an outdoor terrace. Champagnebaren is a newly renovated banquet hall

Since 1997, focus has been set on staging international performances. The theatre houses diverse events, spanning from club-scene entertainment, concerts, theatre and readings to children's philosophy. Although built as a theatre, the main focus today is on music. Over 600 events were staged in 2010, 2011 was expected to see around 1000 events.

== See also ==
- Djurgårdsteatern
- Mindre teatern
