= Internationella Engelska Gymnasiet Södermalm =

Secondary school in Södermalm, Sweden

Coordinates: 59.30914086358211°N 18.07193336515943°E

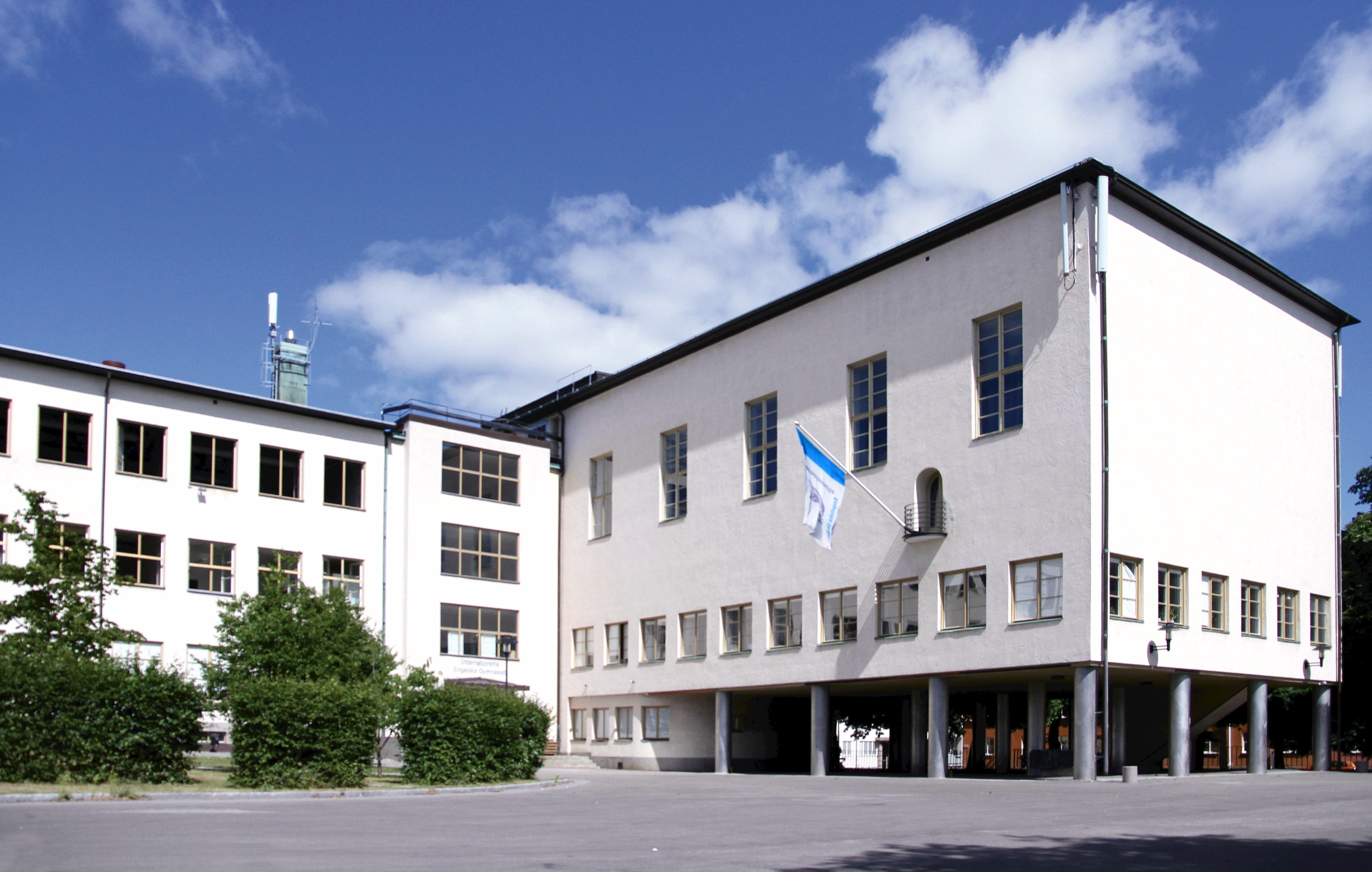

Internationella Engelska Gymnasiet Södermalm, also known as the International English Gymnasium Södermalm, was a secondary school located in Södermalm, Sweden. The institute offered four Swedish national programmes and the International Baccalaureate (IB) programme, which would qualify students for university studies in Sweden or abroad.

Most courses (except Swedish, Civics A, Law and Modern Languages) were taught in English language. Most of the teachers were native English speakers recruited from USA, Canada, United Kingdom and other English-speaking countries. Nearly 25% of the previous teaching staff had PhDs in their fields; and the majority of the staff had master's degrees and qualified teacher-status. There were around eighty staff members who worked at IEGS.

The school was free of charge for the students. The education was paid for by the national voucher system.

At IEGS a house system had been introduced and adapted from the British model. Teachers and students are assigned to a house, which forms the basis for group activities, mentor time, assemblies and competitions. IEGS had four houses: King House, Russel House, Pavlov House and Curie House.

In 2025 the school announced that it was not financially viable and would close in 2026.
