= Swedish fashion =

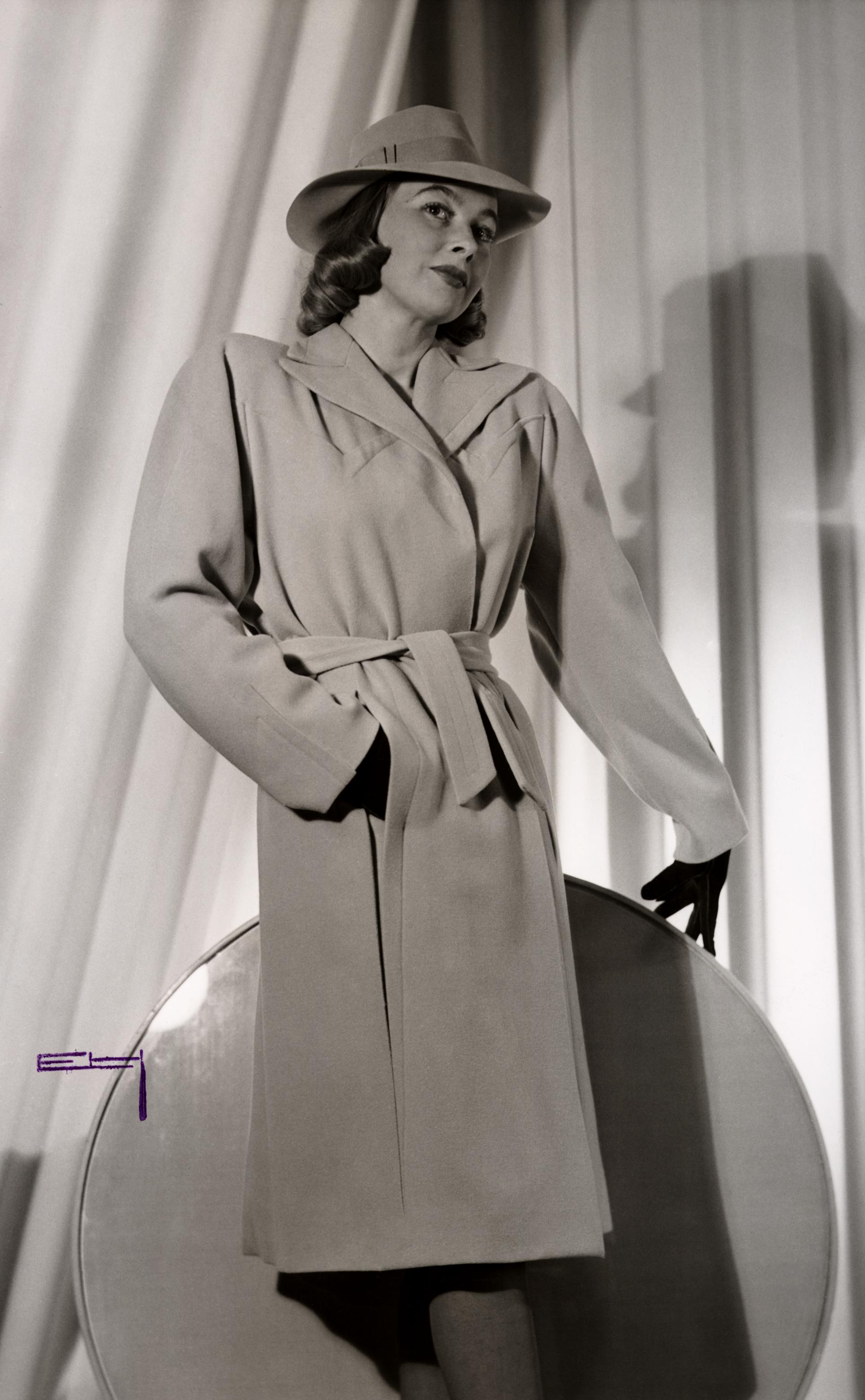
A Swedish fashion image from 1943. The long trench coat and hat provide protection from the outside climate, while still offering an aesthetic quality.

Sweden is home to a number of influential fashion brands with large international spread, ranging from more high-end contemporaries such as Acne Studios, J.Lindeberg, and Filippa K, as well as the global retail company H&M and its subsidiary brands like COS and & Other Stories. Sweden's capital, Stockholm, is the host of the country's biannual fashion week.

Swedish fashion embraces usefulness as it is the attitude surrounding most consumer products throughout Northern Europe. Clothing is made to be practical and purposeful. This is largely due to the country's long history of harsh climatic conditions and its strong Lutheran background. For instance, one of the most known Swedish brands oriented towards outdoor and functional clothing is Fjällräven, which notably in the early to mid 2010s saw worldwide streetwear success for its signature Kånken backpack.

Simplicity is also a common theme among the lines of Swedish fashion designers, meaning clothes tend to be more neutral toned with less intricate details. Clothes are not necessarily designed for the individual to stand out. There is a strong cultural influence that plays a role in this.

== Swedish style ==
Its use of neutral colour palettes, straight lines, and moveable designs supposedly differs from the other fashion capitals of the world that often showcase impractical luxury items made to stand out. Sweden embraces a region-wide mindset of owning and creating products that are just as functional as they are aesthetically pleasing, and clothing is not exempt from that criterion.

== Brands and designers ==
Acne Studios is centered in Stockholm, Sweden and was created in 1996. It is the most recognized and universal brand from Scandinavia and an indulgent clothing line with styles for both men and women. They sell shoes, accessories, and clothing, with their denim being the item that got the business booming. Acne stores have expanded worldwide in a variety of countries, and they showcase their collections, as well as other art and design culture in the Acne Paper magazine that is published twice yearly. This high fashion label sells some of the bolder, more fashion-forward pieces in the Swedish fashion design world, though it still emphasizes simplicity.

Rodebjer is a line designed by the Swedish person Carin Rodebjer that started in New York while she attended the Fashion Institute of Technology, though the original pieces were also sold to stores in Sweden. Rodebjer's clothes are now sold in twenty countries. This brand sells adaptable clothing.

J. Lindeberg is a collection that began in 1996 in Stockholm and New York. Created by Johan Lindeberg, this brand produces high fashion activewear with a prominence in golfing and skiing attire. Only the men's line sells non-sporty clothing, such as denim, knitwear, and suits. Both the menswear and womenswear collections have golfing and skiing specific items.

H&M (Hennes & Mauritz), possibly the most well-known Scandinavian fashion brand, is a Swedish based clothing line which began in 1947 in Västerås, Sweden, that has expanded worldwide. Starting out with only women's clothing, the company now sells men's, women's, and children's apparel, as well as home design products.

Gudrun Sjödén is a Swedish fashion designer known for a colorful line of clothes.

Whyred was created by Roland Hjort, Lena Patriksson and Jonas Clason in 1999. The brand is known for its signature parka, a useful piece for the harsh winters of the Scandinavian region. The brand features purposeful items with added unexpected twists, to keep their designs moving forward. Elegance and modernism are the guiding forces behind this brand. Men's and women's everyday wear, outerwear, and more formal pieces are all part of the Whyred collection.

== Fashion Week in Sweden ==
Fashion week in Sweden began in 2005, and is where roughly thirty designers biannually display their new collections in a series of fashion shows. It takes place in the city of Stockholm at Berns and Bukowskis. Designers put on their own shows to showcase their lines for the upcoming season. A show typically displays the spring/summer line or the fall/winter line. Fashion Week gives buyers a chance to give publicity to and talk about the designers' pieces and the general public a preview of what to expect come the change of season. Fashion week in Sweden was called off in 2019, due to increasing demands in sustainability.

In 2020, Stockholm Fashion Week was re-launched in a digital fashion to meet sustainability demands.

In 2022, Stockholm Fashion Week re-launched as a physical biannual event.
