= Pionen =

Data center in Sweden

Coordinates: 59°18′44.59″N 18°5′7.79″E

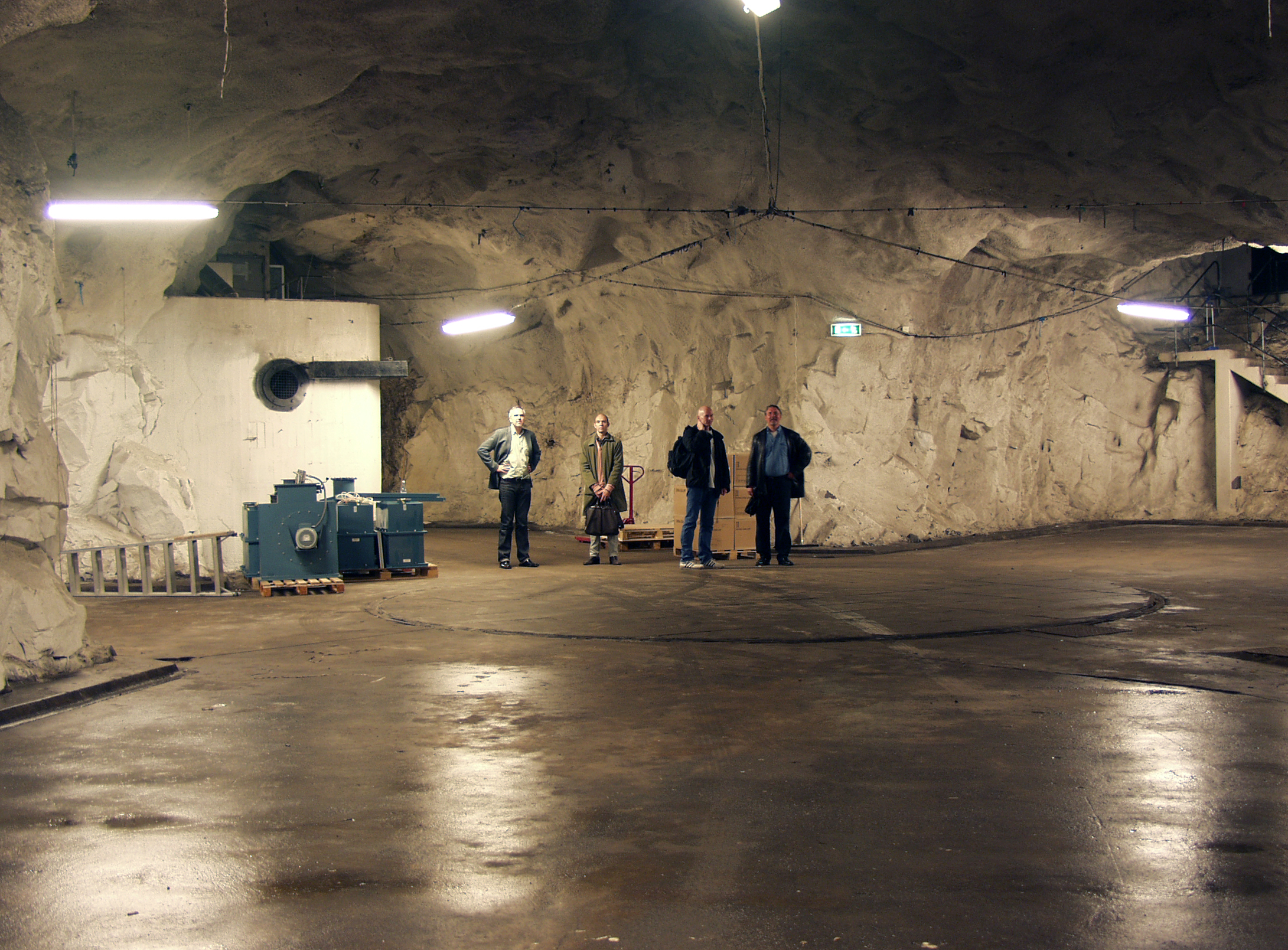
Pionen in 2006, before it became a data center.

Pionen is a former civil defence center built in the White Mountains Södermalm borough of Stockholm, Sweden in 1943 to protect essential government functions. The address of the Pionen data center is Renstiernas gata 35 and 37.

It was converted into a data center by the Swedish Internet service provider Bahnhof. It opened on 11 September 2008 and Bahnhof continues to use the facility today. Because of the facility being buried under the mountain, secured by a 40-centimeter thick door, and only reachable by an entrance tunnel, the data center is capable of withstanding a hydrogen bomb. The Pionen data center is also a colocation centre. In 2010 WikiLeaks used Pionen's colocation services to store their servers.

== Environment ==
Pionen is a data center deep below 30 meters of granite, with three physical datalinks into the mountain. Also, Pionen is located in Central Stockholm, with 1,100 square meters of space. Pionen features fountains, greenhouses, simulated daylight and a huge salt water fish tank. Its data center has two backup power generators, which are actually submarine engines.
