= Gudrun Sjödén (fashion label) =

Swedish fashion label and retail chain

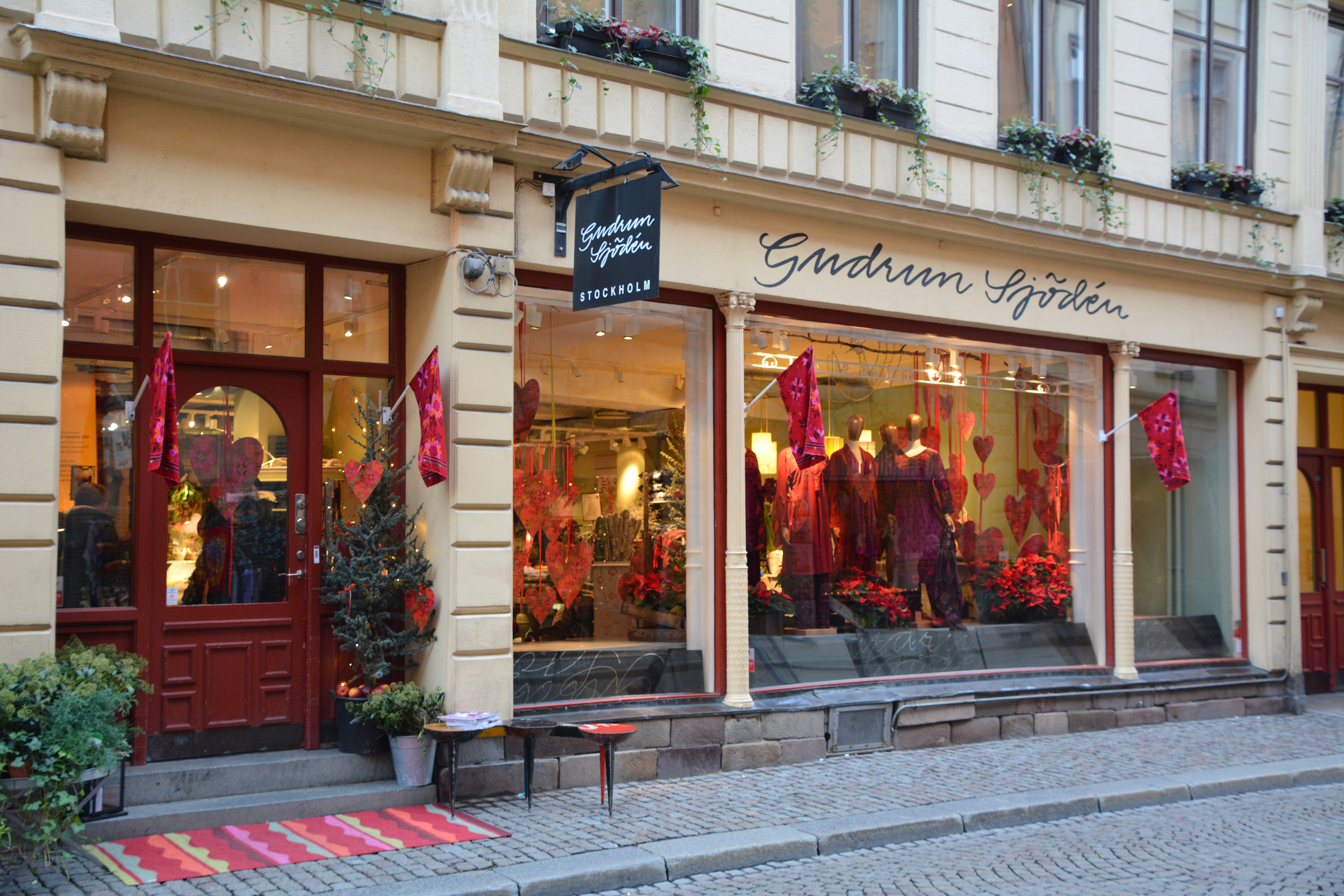
Gudrun Sjödén, Stockholm, Sweden

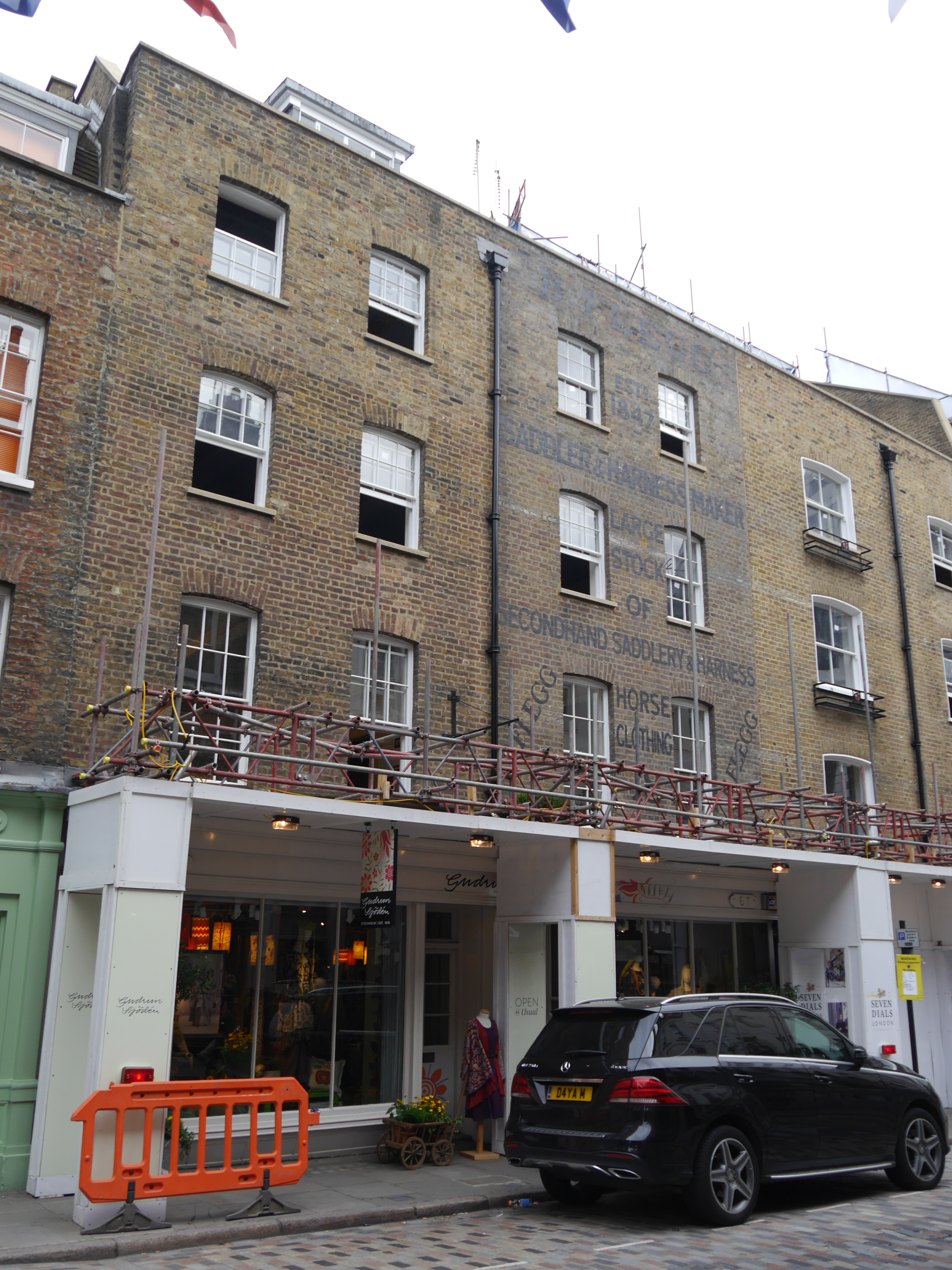
Gudrun Sjödén, Monmouth Street, Covent Garden, London

Gudrun Sjödén (née Rådevik) is a Swedish fashion label and retail chain. In 2025 the company is headquartered in Stockholm, and has 22 stores in Sweden, Denmark, Finland, France the UK and the US, and via a Germany subsidiary, eleven stores in Germany. The company produces and sells colorful clothes in a Scandinavian fashion design, using natural materials, and unusual in fashion labels for offering sizes up to XXL.

== History ==
In 1976, Gudrun Sjödén, a 1963 graduate of Konstfack College of Arts and Design in Stockholm, working with her husband Bjorn, opened a store in Stockholm on Regeringsgatan selling clothing of her own design. By 1978 the pair had mail order sales of SEK 2 million.

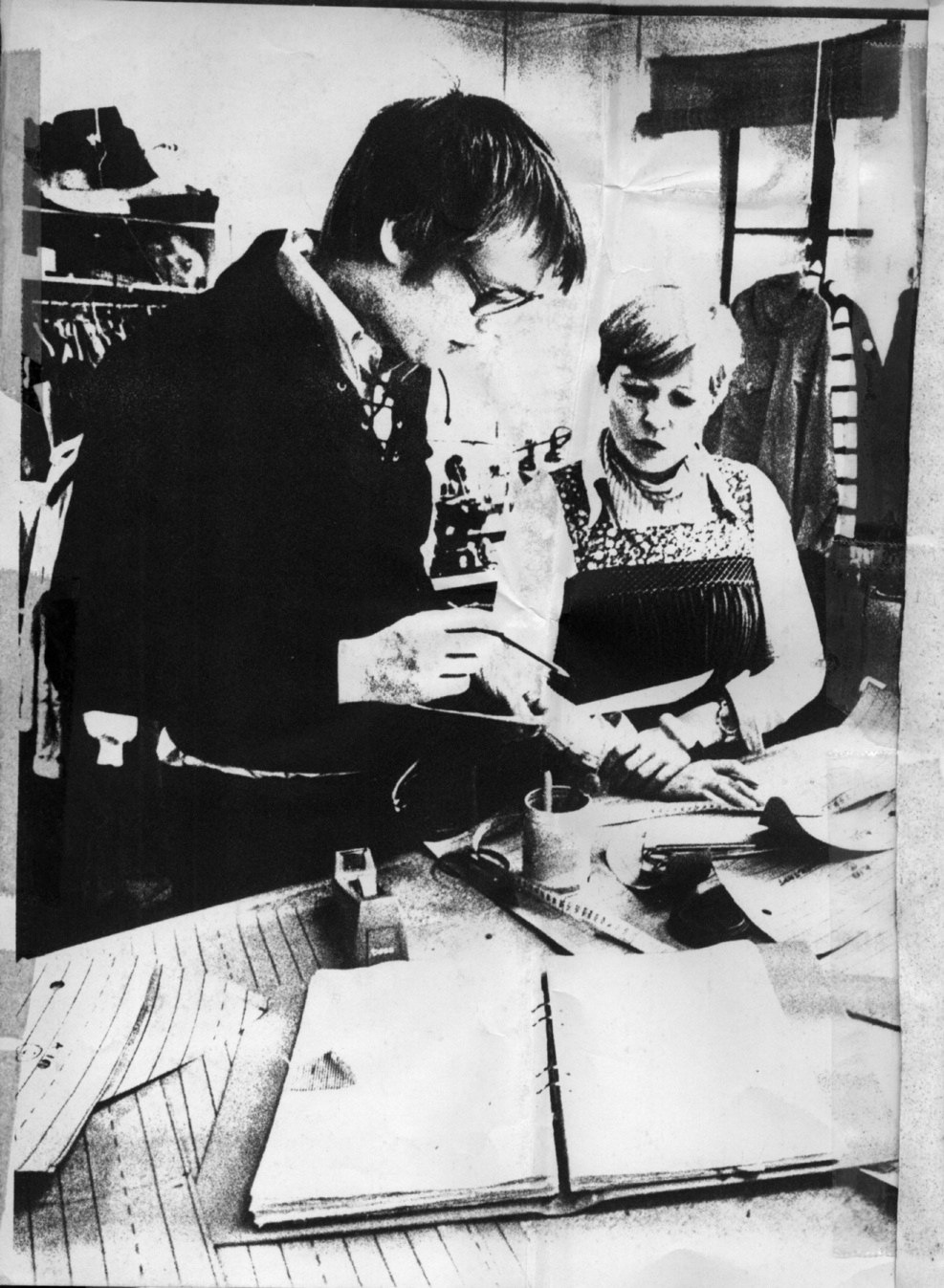
Gudrun and Björn Sjödén at work.

In 1981 Sjödén established mail order sales in Germany with her sister, Christina Rådevik, and between 1983 and 1990 they opened two stores in the US, as well as stores in Stockholm, Zirndorf, Gothenburg and Nuremberg.

In 1993 the company began selling a home textiles collection. Over the next several years the mail order business was expanded to Norway and the United Kingdom.

In 2003 a store was opened on Stora Nygatan in Stockholm, selling fashion, home textiles and flowers. In 2004 Sjödén opened a store in Malmö, Sweden and she was named “Entrepreneur of the Year” by Stockholm Business Week magazine. In 2005 Sjödén was awarded the Stockholm Chamber of Trade "World Class Prize". Stores were later opened in Hamburg, Oslo, Copenhagen and Stuttgart.

In 2007 Sjödén was presented by King Carl Gustaf of Sweden with His Majesty the King's medal, Litteris et Artibus, for her contribution as a fashion designer. After 2009 the Gudrun Sjödén company continued to expand, opening various stores and a warehouse. Sales had a turnover of SEK 500 million Swedish kronor by 2011, and the company employed about 230 people.

In 2012 Sjödén was presented with ELLE magazine's Sustainability Award and also the Businesswoman of the Year Award from BPW, Business and Professional Women Sweden. She carried out environmental work at the Parsons School of Design in New York City, and in 2013 was awarded the Kungliga Patriotiska Sällskapet (The Royal Patriotic Society) Business Medal.

They opened in the UK in 2012. Gudrun Sjödén's latest store opened in November 2025 in Paris.
