= Gudrun Sjödén =

Swedish fashion designer (born 1941)

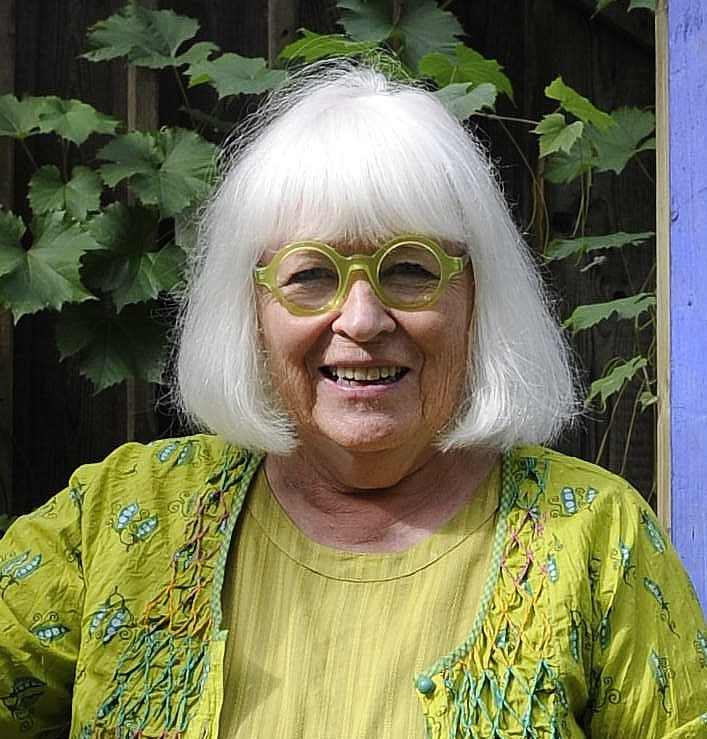
Gudrun Sjödén in 2013

Gudrun Sjödén (born 5 June 1941) is a Swedish fashion designer.

== Early life ==
Sjödén grew up in the village of Julita near Katrineholm in Södermanland, and was educated in textile and fashion at Konstfack from 1958 to 1963. She married photographer Björn Sjödén (1940-2016) in 1961. Along with him she in 1976 opened the first Gudrun Sjödén clothing shop in Stockholm at Regeringsgatan.

In 2007, she received the Litteris et Artibus medal from King Carl Gustaf of Sweden.
