= Söder tea =

Swedish blended tea

Söder tea (tea from Södermalm – a district of Stockholm) or Söderblandning (Södermalm blend) is a Swedish blend of tea made from black tea, tropical fruits and flowers. The blend was invented in 1979 by Vernon Mauris and is named after the area Södermalm in Stockholm where his shop is located. Söder tea is drunk in Sweden, and also in Japan. Vernon Mauris exports almost 4000 kg of Söder tea to Japan each year.
