= Nytorget =

Square in Södermalm, Stockholm, Sweden

Coordinates: 59°18′44″N 18°05′00″E

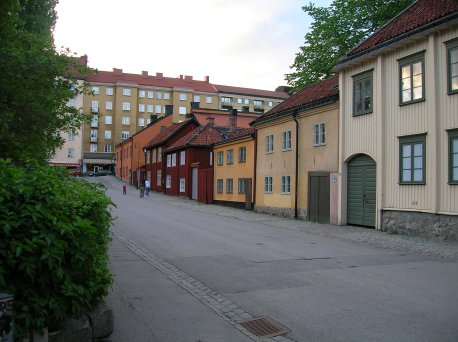
An image of a street in Nytorget

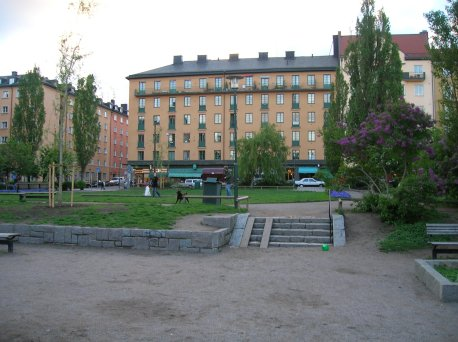
A picnic place and square on Nytorget

Nytorget is a square on Södermalm, a district of Stockholm, Sweden.

== Description ==
The name roughly translates into "New Square", and for most of the 17th century until the early 20th century, it was a venue for open air markets as well as a locals hangout. There are a number of cafés and popular bars and restaurants at Nytorget. It was the location where Jacob Johan Anckarström (1762–27 April 1792), the supposed assassin of Gustav III of Sweden was exhibited in wooden shackles so the farmers could throw stones at him before his execution in 1792, which took place in another section of Södermalm. Greta Garbo was born on Nytorget in 1905 and lived a few blocks away. The area has been immortalized in numerous Swedish plays and novels, most notably in the 1960 novel Mina drömmars stad by Per Anders Fogelström (1917-1998).
