= Oscar Swartz =

Swedish entrepreneur, writer and blogger

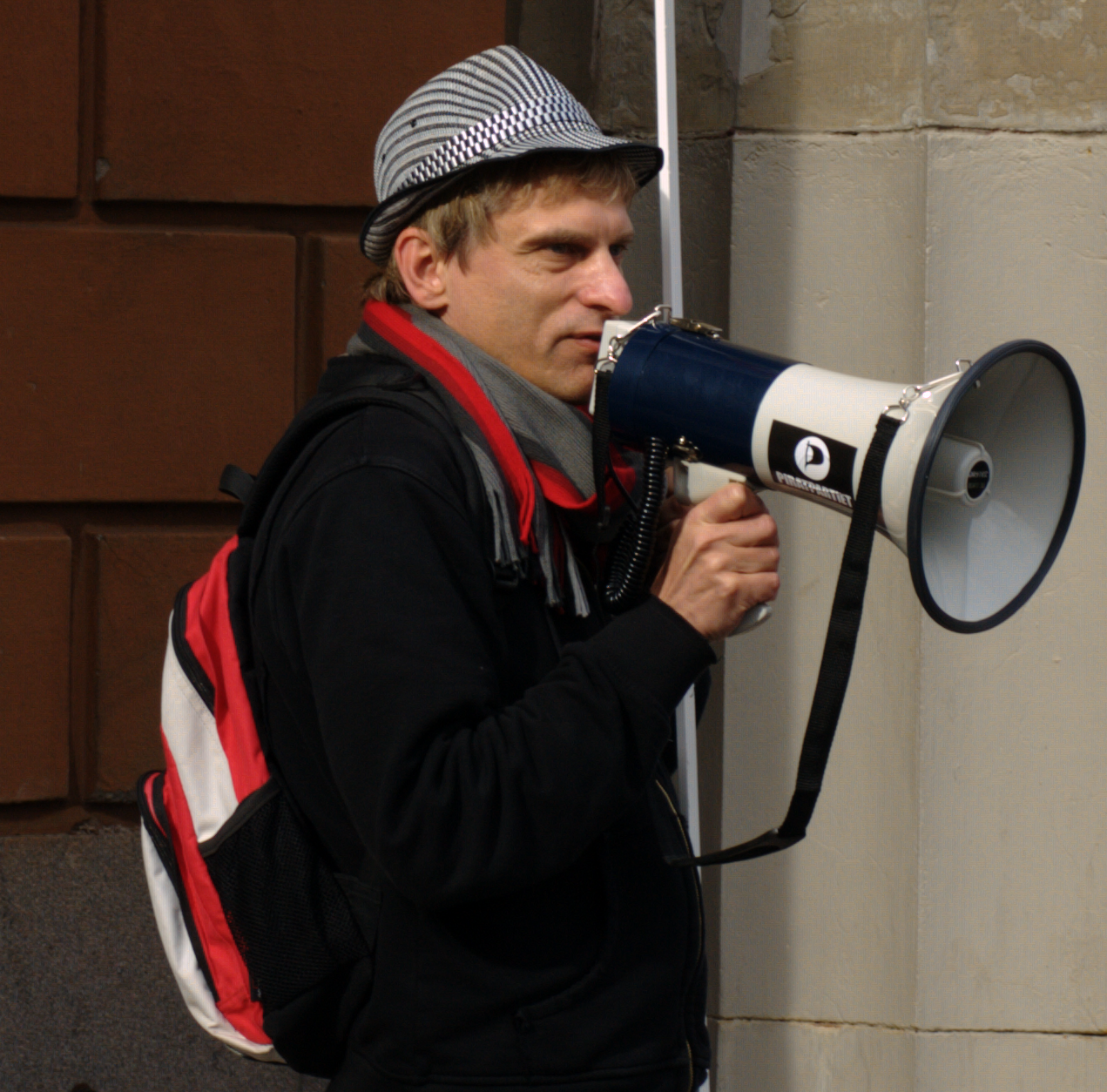
Oscar Swartz during a protest against the legislative changes governing the FRA in Stockholm, 2008.

Per Oscar Swartz (December 1, 1959) is a Swedish entrepreneur, writer and blogger.

Oscar Swartz was born in Solna, Stockholm County. He is the great-grandson of the former Swedish Prime Minister Carl Swartz, and a second cousin of the publisher Eva Swartz and the journalist Richard Swartz. He has a doctorate in economics and managerial economics from the Stockholm School of Economics. In 1994 he founded Bahnhof, the first independent Internet service provider in Sweden. He left the company in 2004 after some internal disputes.

Since July 2005 he runs the blog Texplorer where he covers issues such as information technology, freedom and integrity on the Internet, file sharing and intellectual property. He has authored two reports, published by the Swedish liberal free market think tank Timbro, on these issues. He is a member of the Swedish Pirate Party.

Swartz is openly gay. In 1995 he co-founded the magazine QX, which is today the largest magazine for LGBT people in Scandinavia.
