= Sofia Church =

Coordinates: 59°18′44″N 18°05′18″E

- Sofia kyrka
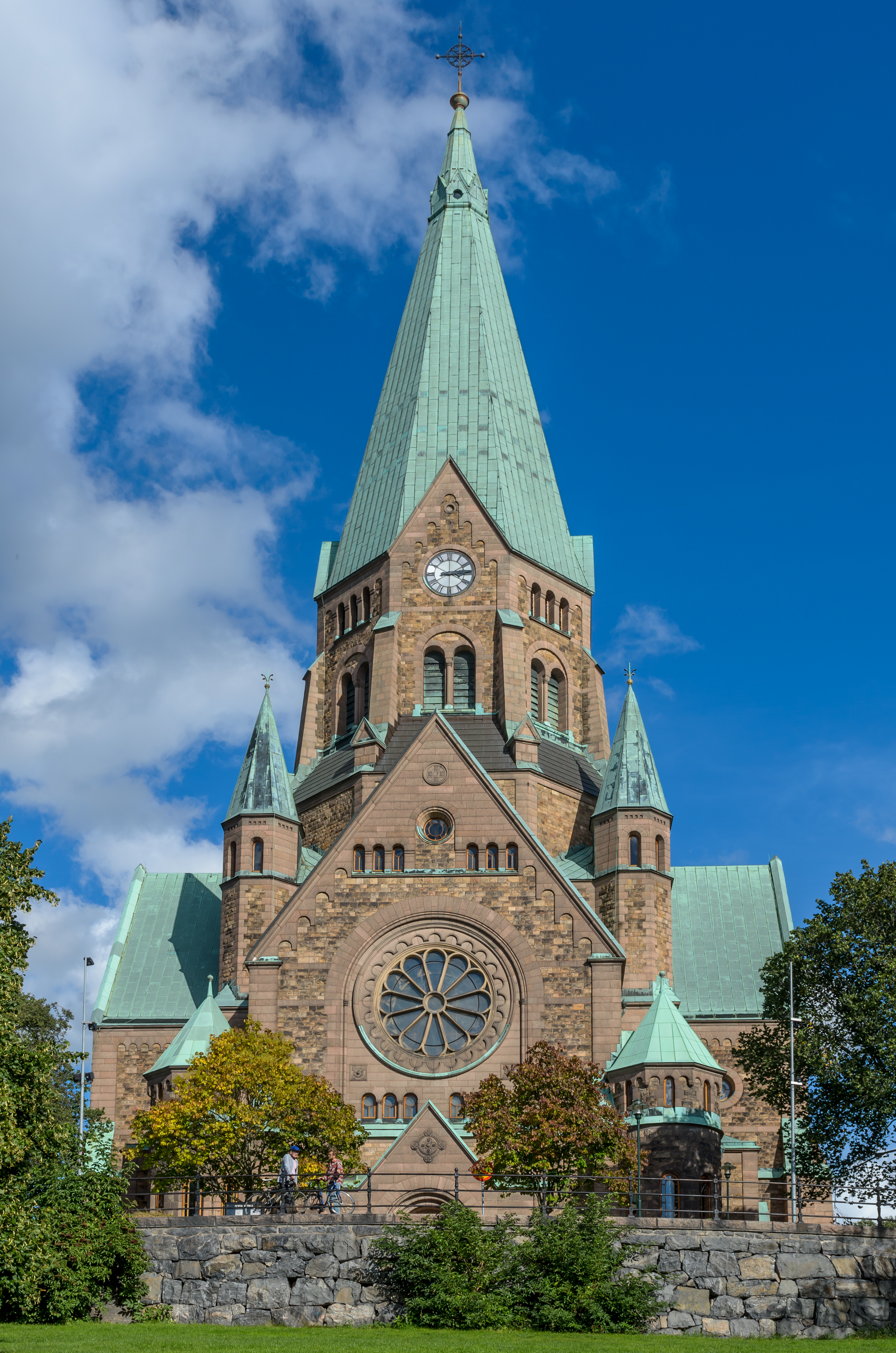
- Sofia Church in September 2012
- Sofia Church
- Location: Stockholm
- Country: Sweden
- Denomination: Church of Sweden

Architecture
- Architect: Gustaf Hermansson
- Completed: 1906

Administration
- Diocese: Stockholm
- Parish: Sofia

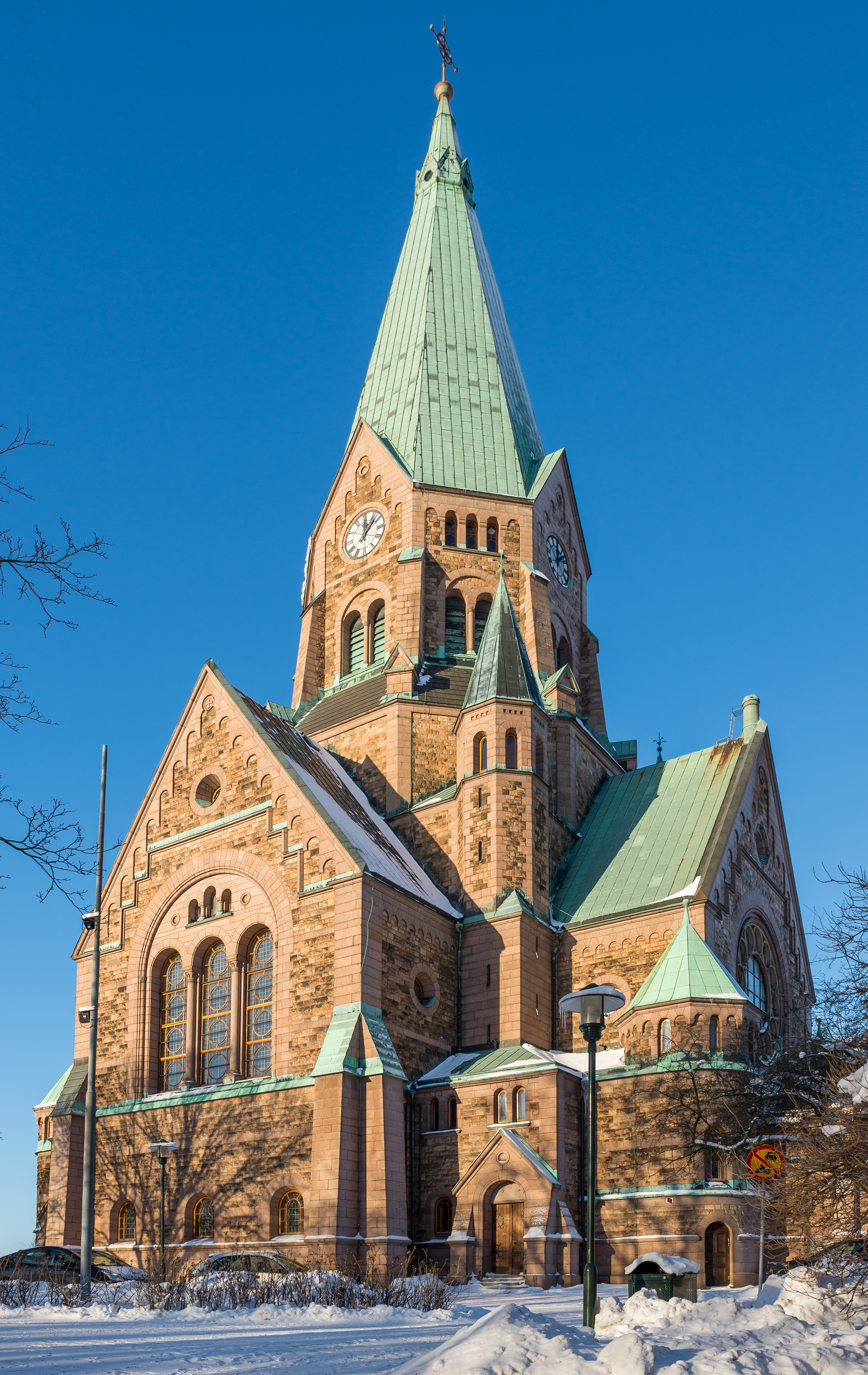
Sofia Church

Sofia Church (Swedish: Sofia kyrka), named after the Swedish queen Sophia of Nassau, is one of the major churches in Stockholm, Sweden. It was designed during an architectural contest in 1899 and was inaugurated in 1906. It is located in the eastern part of the island of Södermalm, standing on the north east peak of the Vita Bergen park. Sofia church belongs to Sofia parish of the Church of Sweden.

== See also ==
- List of churches in Stockholm
