= Södermalm =

Island and urban district in Stockholm, Sweden

- 18th century housing facing Riddarfjärden

- Location within Stockholm Municipality Location within Stockholm

Geography
- Location: Baltic Sea
- Coordinates: 59°18′47″N 18°04′05″E
- Area: 5.71 km^{2} (2.20 sq mi)

Administration
- Sweden
- Borough: Södermalm borough
- Municipality: Stockholm Municipality

Södermalm, often shortened to just Söder, is the southern district of Stockholm City Centre.

== Overview ==
Söder Stockholm aerial video

The Södermalm district covers the island of the same name (formerly called Åsön), which originally was not fully separated from the peninsula of Södertörn (or the rest of the Swedish mainland). Since the Danvik Canal was completed in 1929, water on both its north and south sides have flowed freely to the Baltic Sea, albeit passing through a lock and a man-made waterway.

Södermalm is connected to its surrounding areas by a number of bridges. It connects to Gamla stan to the north by Slussen, a grid of road and rail and a lock separating the lake Mälaren from the Baltic Sea, to Långholmen to the northwest by one of the city's larger bridges, Västerbron, to the islet Reimersholme to the west, to Liljeholmen to the southwest by the bridge Liljeholmsbron, to Årsta by Årstabron and Skansbron, to Johanneshov by Johanneshovsbron and Skanstullsbron to the south, and, finally, to Södra Hammarbyhamnen to the east by Danvikstull Bridge.

Administratively, Södermalm is part of Stockholm Municipality. It constitutes, together with Gamla stan and some other districts, from 2007 the administrative district Södermalms stadsdelsområde, often translated as Södermalm borough.

== History ==
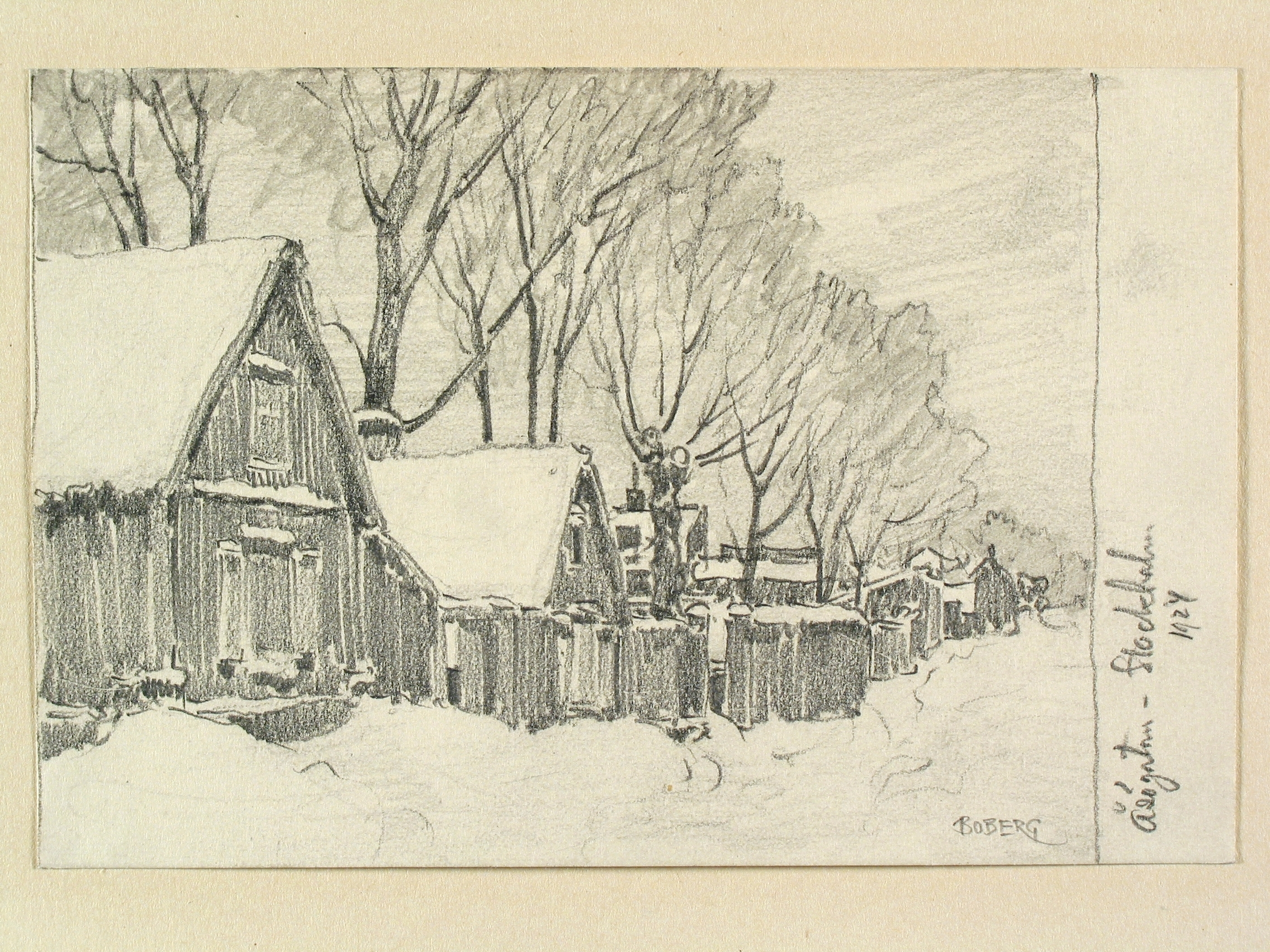
Wooden buildings on Södermalm in 1924, drawn by Ferdinand Boberg.

The name Södermalm (as Suthaermalm) is first mentioned in 1288 in a letter from Bishop Anund of Strängnäs. Until the early 17th century Södermalm was mainly a rural, agricultural area. Its first urban areas were planned and built in the mid 17th century, comprising a mixture of working class housing, such as the little red cottages of which a few can still be seen in northeastern Södermalm, and the summer houses and pavilions of wealthier families, such as Emanuel Swedenborg's pavilion, which is now in the outdoor museum Skansen. During this time, it was also the location of perhaps the first theatre in Scandinavia, Björngårdsteatern. Södermalm is often poetically named Söders höjder ("heights of the south"), which reflects its topography of sheer cliffs and rocky hills. Indeed, the hills of Södermalm provide remarkable views of Stockholm's skyline.

In the 18th century, the working-class cottages that clung to Mariaberget, the steep cliffs facing Riddarfjärden, were replaced by the large buildings that are still present today. It was not until the beginning of the 20th century that urbanization grasped the entire width of Södermalm, and even today parts of Södermalm have a rural feeling to them, as for instance the landscape of tiny allotments that climb the slopes of Eriksdal.

Södermalm was once known as the "slum" area of Stockholm. However today, Södermalm is known as the home of bohemian, alternative culture and a broad range of cultural amenities. Meanwhile, the growing demand for housing, as well as an increasing gentrification of Stockholm's central parts, makes apartments in Södermalm more and more difficult or expensive to come by. Thus what was once a working-class district is now somewhat a district of the privileged.

== Geography ==
=== Neighbourhoods ===
Södermalm is roughly divided into the following neighbourhoods (from west to east):

- Högalid (western area):
  - Bergsund
  - Drakenberg
  - Heleneborg
  - Tantolunden
  - Zinkensdamm
- Maria Magdalena (mid-northern area):
  - Mariaberget
  - Mariatorget
  - Slussen
  - Södra stationsområdet
- Åsö (mid-southern area):
  - Eriksdal
  - Helgalund
  - Medborgarplatsen
  - Rosenlund
  - Skanstull
- Katarina-Sofia (north-eastern area):
  - Blecktornsområdet
  - Danvikstull
  - Ersta
  - Norra Hammarbyhamnen
  - Nytorget
  - Mosebacke

=== Parishes ===
There are four parishes of the Church of Sweden on the island (from west to east):

- Högalid, partitioned from the parish of Maria Magdalena in 1925.
- Maria Magdalena, partitioned from the Stockholm city parish in 1591, and subsequently divided into the modern parishes.
- Katarina, partitioned from Maria Magdalena in 1654.
- Sofia, partitioned from Katarina in 1917 and also includes parts of the mainland south of Södermalm.

=== Schools ===
- Internationella Engelska Gymnasiet Södermalm

== Main sights ==
- Fotografiska Stockholm
- Göta Lejon
- Högalid Church
- Karl Johansslussen
- Katarina Elevator
- Katarina Church
- Maria Magdalena Church
- Medborgarhuset
- Stockholm Mosque
- St. Eric's Cathedral
- Skatteskrapan
- Slussen
- Södra Teatern
- Sofia kyrka
- Stockholm Södra station
- Söder Torn
- Nytorget
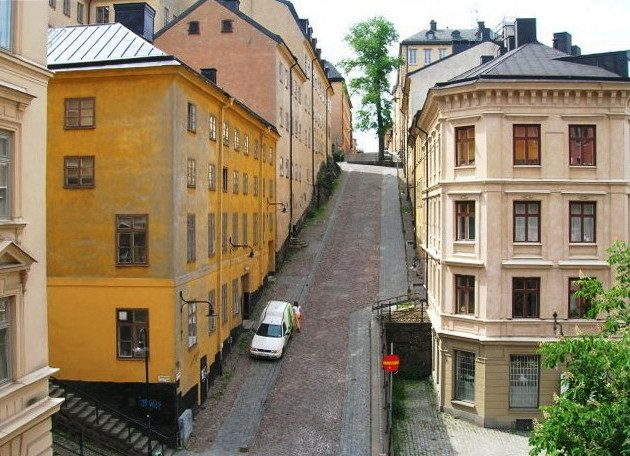
Brännkyrkagatan on Södermalm.

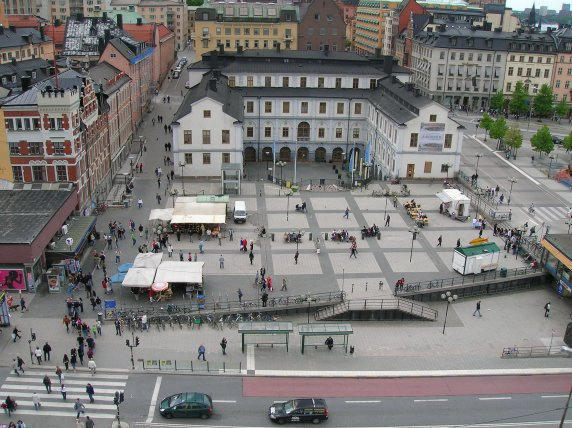
Ryssgården square at the Slussen area, Södermalm.

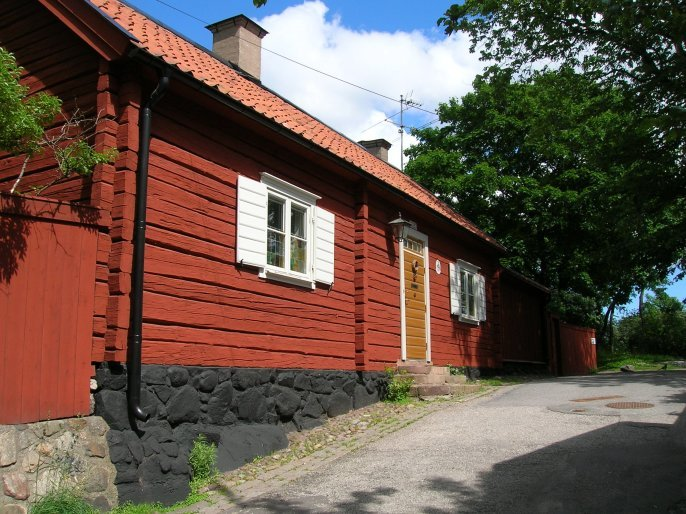
Wooden house at Åsögatan 213, built 1730.

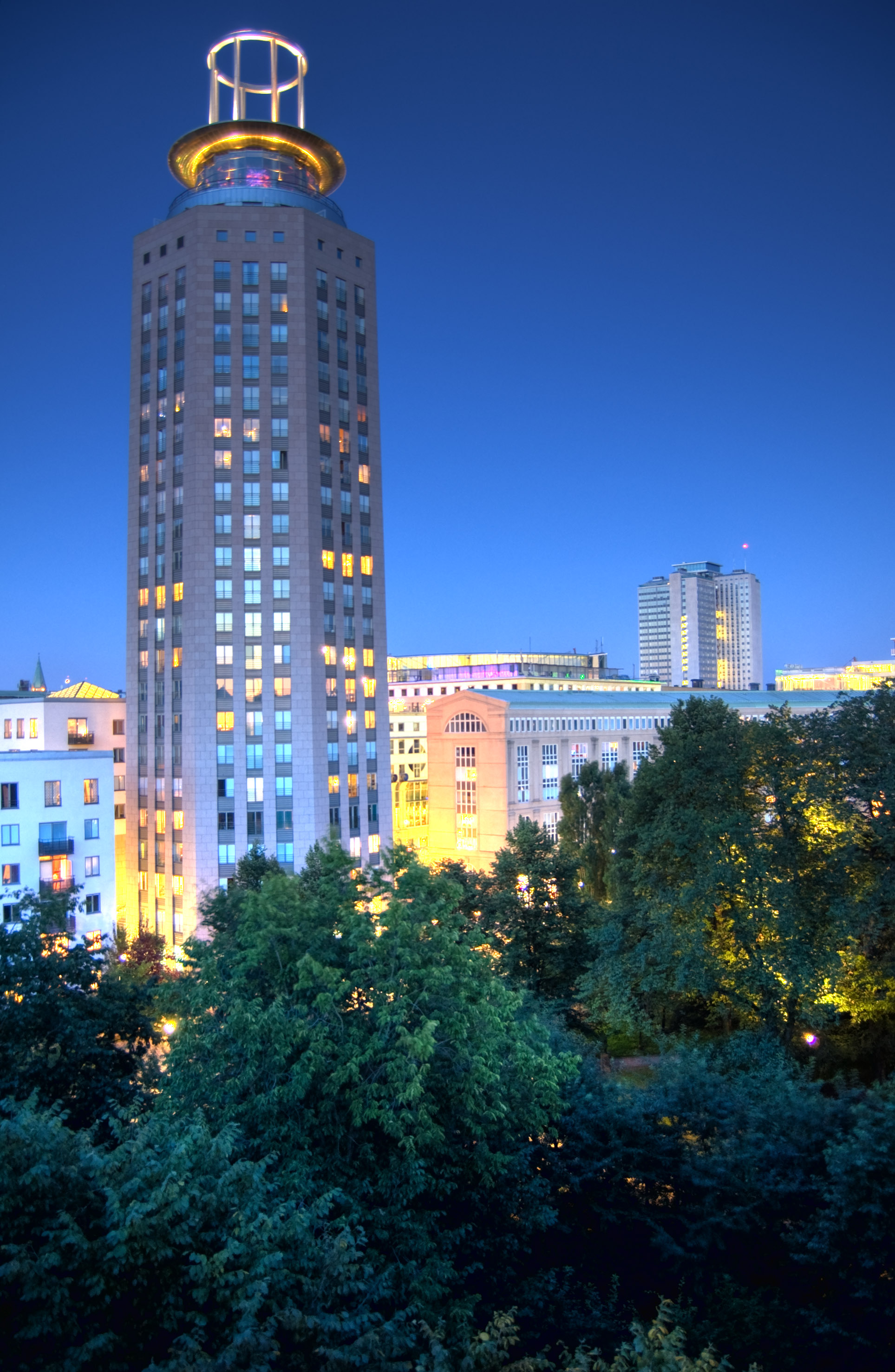
Söder Torn, an 86-meter-tall building near Medborgarplatsen. Built in 1997 after drawings from the Danish architect Henning Larsen.

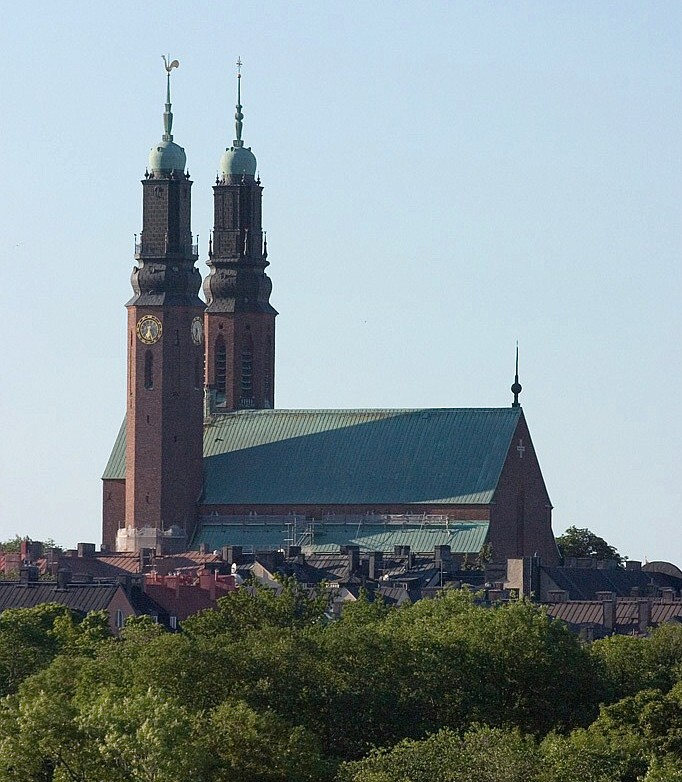
The Högalid Church in July 2006.

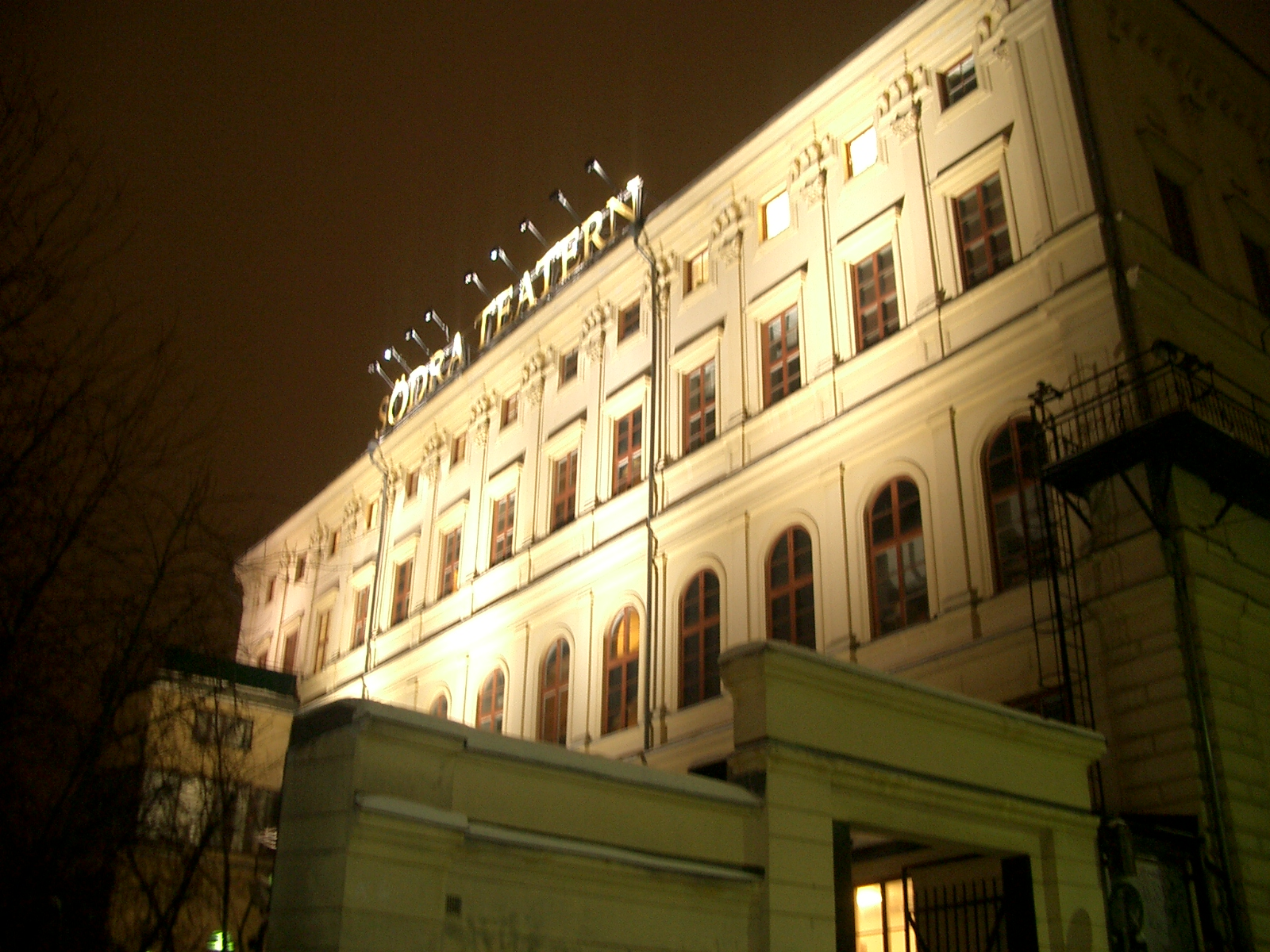
Södra Teatern at Mosebacke Square, Södermalm.

== Culture ==
=== In poetry and fiction ===
- The songs and poems (Fredman's Songs and Fredman's Epistles) of the popular 18th-century poet and songwriter Carl Michael Bellman are filled with recurring references to names of places, primarily bars and mead halls, on Södermalm.
- The celebrated first paragraph of August Strindberg's satirical novel The Red Room (Röda rummet) describes Stockholm as seen from Mosebacke on Södermalm, where much of the story takes place.
- City of My Dreams (Mina drömmars stad), the first in a series of books by Per Anders Fogelström telling the story of several generations of Stockholmers, follows the young worker Henning's life on Södermalm.
- Lisbeth Salander and other characters in the Millennium Trilogy by Stieg Larsson live and work on Södermalm. Much of the action in those books takes place in that district.
- Greta Garbo grew up in the area.
- The artists Yung Lean, Bladee, and Ecco2k grew up in the area, all of them eventually becoming future collaborators.

=== In pop culture ===
- Mojang, a video game developer and publisher best known for the creation of the popular game Minecraft, has their main offices located on Södermalm.

== Notable incidents ==
In May of 2024, two elks were found wandering around Södermalm. This type of incident had happened previously, in 2023 as well as in 2022.

== Transport ==
=== Railway and Stockholm metro stations ===
- Hornstull: Red line metro
- Mariatorget: Red line metro
- Medborgarplatsen: Green line metro
- Skanstull: Green line metro
- Slussen: Green line metro, Red line metro and Saltsjöbanan (Saltsjöbanans station is suspended until 2020)
- Stockholm Södra station: Commuter rail
- Zinkensdamm: Red Line Metro

=== Bridges ===
- Centralbron
- Danviksbro
- Johanneshovsbron
- Liljeholmsbron
- Västerbron
- Långholmsbron
- Pålsundsbron
- Reimersholmsbron
- Skansbron
- Skanstullsbron
- Årstabroarna

== Notable residents ==
- Anna Takanen, actor, director and writer

== See also ==
- Egalia
- SoFo
- Söder tea
- Willem Berner
