= Vita Bergen =

Park in Södermalm, Stockholm, Sweden

Coordinates: 59°18′40″N 18°05′23″E

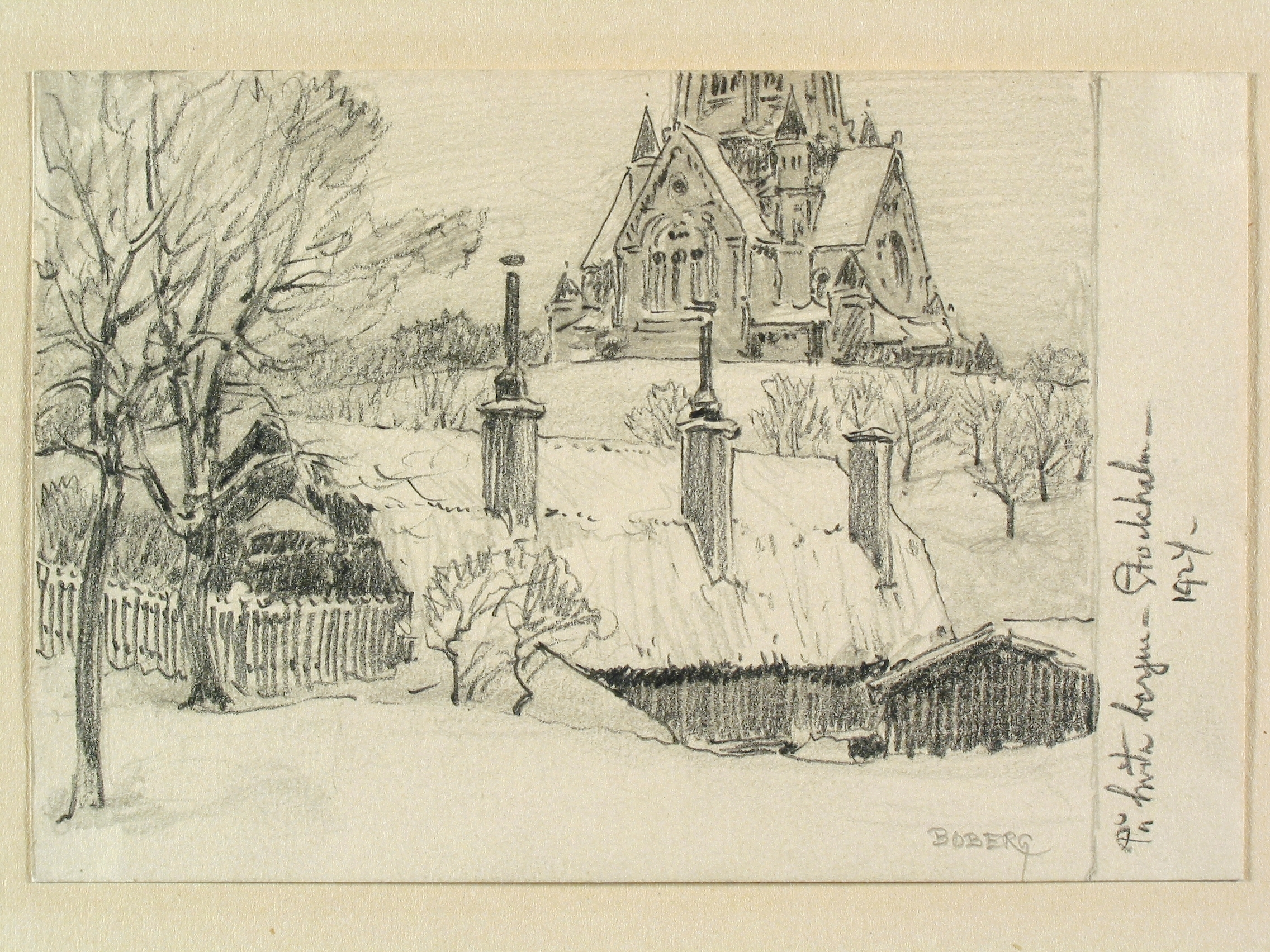
Drawing of Vita Bergen by Ferdinand Boberg in 1924.

Vita Bergen (lit. The White Mountains) is a park area of Södermalm in Stockholm. The former civil defence center Pionen, now used to host a data center, is located there.

Vita Bergen is also mentioned in the novel The Red Room by August Strindberg as the place where Ygberg, one of the characters, lives.
