= List of West German Athletics Championships winners =

The West German Athletics Championships (German: Deutsche Leichtathletik-Meisterschaften) was an annual outdoor track and field competition organised by the German Athletics Association, which served as the West German national championships for the sport. The two- or three-day event was held in summer months, varying from late June to early August, and the venue changed annually. The winners were almost exclusively West German nationals, though a small number of foreign athletes were invited to compete, and won.

The German Athletics Championships had a long history, dating back to 1898. After the division of Germany at the end of World War II, the organising body of the all-Germany championships, the German Athletics Association, remained in West Germany. As a result, when the national championships resumed in 1946, only West German athletes could compete in them. East German athletes were re-incorporated into the event in 1991, restoring the status of the competition as an all-Germany event.

== Men ==
=== 100 metres ===
- 1960: Armin Hary
- 1961: Manfred Germar
- 1962: Heinz Schumann
- 1963: Alfred Hebauf
- 1964: Manfred Knickenberg
- 1965: Manfred Knickenberg
- 1966: Manfred Knickenberg
- 1967: Harmut Wilke
- 1968: Gert Metz
- 1969: Gert Metz
- 1970: Günther Nickel
- 1971: Karl-Heinz Klotz
- 1972: Manfred Ommer
- 1973: Jobst Hirscht
- 1974: Manfred Ommer
- 1975: Klaus Ehl
- 1976: Dieter Steinmann
- 1977: Bernd Sattler
- 1978: Werner Zaske
- 1979: Fritz Heer
- 1980: Christian Haas
- 1981: Christian Haas
- 1982: Christian Haas
- 1983: Christian Haas
- 1984: Ralf Lübke
- 1985: Christian Haas
- 1986: Christian Haas
- 1987: Christian Haas
- 1988: Andreas Maul
- 1989: Wolfgang Haupt
- 1990: Peter Klein

=== 200 metres ===
- 1960: Armin Hary
- 1961: Manfred Germar
- 1962: Manfred Germar
- 1963: Alfred Hebauf
- 1964: Heinz Schumann
- 1965: Josef Schwarz
- 1966: Manfred Knickenberg
- 1967: Martin Jellinghaus
- 1968: Martin Jellinghaus
- 1969: Jochen Eigenherr
- 1970: Jochen Eigenherr
- 1971: Karl-Heinz Klotz
- 1972: Manfred Ommer
- 1973: Franz-Peter Hofmeister
- 1974: Manfred Ommer
- 1975: Klaus Ehl
- 1976: Karlheinz Weisenseel
- 1977: Bernd Sattler
- 1978: Franz-Peter Hofmeister
- 1979: Franz-Peter Hofmeister
- 1980: Christian Haas
- 1981: Erwin Skamrahl
- 1982: Erwin Skamrahl
- 1983: Erwin Skamrahl
- 1984: Ralf Lübke
- 1985: Ralf Lübke
- 1986: Ralf Lübke
- 1987: Christian Haas
- 1988: Ralf Lübke
- 1989: Erwin Skamrahl
- 1990: Peter Klein

=== 400 metres ===
- 1960: Carl Kaufmann
- 1961: Johannes Kaiser
- 1962: Hans-Joachim Reske
- 1963: Jürgen Kalfelder
- 1964: Jürgen Kalfelder
- 1965: Jens Ulbricht
- 1966: Siegfried König
- 1967: Fritz Roderfeld
- 1968: Martin Jellinghaus
- 1969: Martin Jellinghaus
- 1970: Thomas Jordan
- 1971: Hermann Köhler
- 1972: Karl Honz
- 1973: Karl Honz
- 1974: Bernd Herrmann
- 1975: Bernd Herrmann
- 1976: Lothar Krieg
- 1977: Bernd Herrmann
- 1978: Franz-Peter Hofmeister
- 1979: Harald Schmid
- 1980: Erwin Skamrahl
- 1981: Hartmut Weber
- 1982: Erwin Skamrahl
- 1983: Hartmut Weber
- 1984: Erwin Skamrahl
- 1985: Erwin Skamrahl
- 1986: Ralf Lübke
- 1987: Mark Henrich
- 1988: Ralf Lübke
- 1989: Norbert Dobeleit
- 1990: Norbert Dobeleit

=== 800 metres ===
- 1960: Paul Schmidt
- 1961: Paul Schmidt
- 1962: Paul Schmidt
- 1963: Manfred Kinder
- 1964: Manfred Kinder
- 1965: Franz-Josef Kemper
- 1966: Franz-Josef Kemper
- 1967: Franz-Josef Kemper
- 1968: Walter Adams
- 1969: Walter Adams
- 1970: Franz-Josef Kemper
- 1971: Franz-Josef Kemper
- 1972: Walter Adams
- 1973: Paul-Heinz Wellmann
- 1974: Willi Wülbeck
- 1975: Willi Wülbeck
- 1976: Willi Wülbeck
- 1977: Willi Wülbeck
- 1978: Willi Wülbeck
- 1979: Willi Wülbeck
- 1980: Willi Wülbeck
- 1981: Willi Wülbeck
- 1982: Willi Wülbeck
- 1983: Willi Wülbeck
- 1984: Axel Harries
- 1985: Matthias Assmann
- 1986: Matthias Assmann
- 1987: Peter Braun
- 1988: Thomas Giessing
- 1989: Peter Braun
- 1990: Jussi Udelhoven

=== 1500 metres ===
- 1960: Adolf Schwarte
- 1961: Karl Eyerkaufer
- 1962: Harald Norpoth
- 1963: Harald Norpoth
- 1964: Harald Norpoth
- 1965: Bodo Tümmler
- 1966: Bodo Tümmler
- 1967: Bodo Tümmler
- 1968: Bodo Tümmler
- 1969: Bodo Tümmler
- 1970: Jürgen May
- 1971: Bodo Tümmler
- 1972: Bodo Tümmler
- 1973: Paul-Heinz Wellmann
- 1974: Paul-Heinz Wellmann
- 1975: Thomas Wessinghage
- 1976: Paul-Heinz Wellmann
- 1977: Thomas Wessinghage
- 1978: Thomas Wessinghage
- 1979: Thomas Wessinghage
- 1980: Thomas Wessinghage
- 1981: Thomas Wessinghage
- 1982: Thomas Wessinghage
- 1983: Uwe Becker
- 1984: Uwe Becker
- 1985: Uwe Becker
- 1986: Uwe Mönkemeyer
- 1987: Dieter Baumann
- 1988: Dieter Baumann
- 1989: Dieter Baumann
- 1990: Eckhardt Rüter

=== 5000 metres ===
- 1960: Alfred Kleefeldt
- 1961: Roland Watschke
- 1962: Peter Kubicki
- 1963: Peter Kubicki
- 1964: Werner Girke
- 1965: Werner Girke
- 1966: Harald Norpoth
- 1967: Harald Norpoth
- 1968: Harald Norpoth
- 1969: Harald Norpoth
- 1970: Harald Norpoth
- 1971: Harald Norpoth
- 1972: Harald Norpoth
- 1973: Harald Norpoth
- 1974: Hans-Jürgen Orthmann
- 1975: Klaus-Peter Hildenbrand
- 1976: Klaus-Peter Hildenbrand
- 1977: Karl Fleschen
- 1978: Frank Zimmermann
- 1979: Frank Zimmermann
- 1980: Karl Fleschen
- 1981: Karl Fleschen
- 1982: Thomas Wessinghage
- 1983: Paul Nothacker
- 1984: Karl Fleschen
- 1985: Thomas Wessinghage
- 1986: Dieter Baumann
- 1987: Thomas Wessinghage
- 1988: Dieter Baumann
- 1989: Christian Husmann
- 1990: Steffen Brand

=== 10,000 metres ===
- 1960: Roland Watschke
- 1961: Roland Watschke
- 1962: Peter Kubicki
- 1963: Peter Kubicki
- 1964: Horst Flosbach
- 1965: Lutz Philipp
- 1966: Manfred Letzerich
- 1967: Lutz Philipp
- 1968: Manfred Letzerich
- 1969: Joachim Leiss
- 1970: Manfred Letzerich
- 1971: Jens Wollenberg
- 1972: Lutz Philipp
- 1973: Detlef Uhlemann
- 1974: Detlef Uhlemann
- 1975: Detlef Uhlemann
- 1976: Klaus-Peter Hildenbrand
- 1977: Detlef Uhlemann
- 1978: Karl Fleschen
- 1979: Karl Fleschen
- 1980: Karl Fleschen
- 1981: Karl Fleschen
- 1982: Hans-Jürgen Orthmann
- 1983: Christoph Herle
- 1984: Christoph Herle
- 1985: Christoph Herle
- 1986: Christoph Herle
- 1987: Herbert Steffny
- 1988: Ralf Salzmann
- 1989: Kurt Stenzel
- 1990: Kurt Stenzel

=== 25K run ===
- 1977: Edmundo Warnke (CHI)
- 1978: Karl Fleschen
- 1979: Hans-Jürgen Orthmann
- 1980: Hans-Jürgen Orthmann
- 1981: Andreas Weniger
- 1982: Michael Spöttel
- 1983: Günther Zahn
- 1984: Herbert Steffny
- 1985: Herbert Steffny
- 1986: Michael Scheytt
- 1987: Dirk Sander
- 1988: Herbert Steffny
- 1989: Kurt Stenzel
- 1990: Kurt Stenzel

=== Marathon ===
- 1960: Jürgen Wedeking
- 1961: Jürgen Wedeking
- 1962: Werner Zylka
- 1963: Jürgen Wedeking
- 1964: Gideon Papke
- 1965: Lothar Reinshagen
- 1966: Karl-Heinz Sievers
- 1967: Karl-Heinz Sievers
- 1968: Hubert Riesner
- 1969: Hubert Riesner
- 1970: Hans Hellbach
- 1971: Lutz Philipp
- 1972: Lutz Philipp
- 1973: Lutz Philipp
- 1974: Anton Gorbunow
- 1975: Günter Mielke
- 1976: Paul Angenvoorth
- 1977: Günter Mielke
- 1978: Reinhard Leibold
- 1979: Michael Spöttel
- 1980: Ralf Salzmann
- 1981: Ralf Salzmann
- 1982: Ralf Salzmann
- 1983: Ralf Salzmann
- 1984: Ralf Salzmann
- 1985: Herbert Steffny
- 1986: Wolfgang Krüger
- 1987: Guido Dold
- 1988: Udo Reeh
- 1989: Uwe Hartmann
- 1990: Josef Oefele

=== 100K run ===
- 1987: Werner Dörrenbächer
- 1988: Heinz Hüglin
- 1989: Heinz Hüglin
- 1990: Karl-Heinz Doll

=== 3000 metres steeplechase ===
- 1960: Heinz Laufer
- 1961: Wilhelm-Rüdiger Böhme
- 1962: Wolfgang Fricke
- 1963: Ludwig Müller
- 1964: Alfons Ida
- 1965: Manfred Letzerich
- 1966: Hans-Werner Wogatzky
- 1967: Manfred Letzerich
- 1968: Klaus-Ludwig Brosius
- 1969: Willi Wagner
- 1970: Rolf Burscheid
- 1971: Jürgen May
- 1972: Willi Wagner
- 1973: Willi Maier
- 1974: Michael Karst
- 1975: Michael Karst
- 1976: Michael Karst
- 1977: Michael Karst
- 1978: Patriz Ilg
- 1979: Michael Karst
- 1980: Patriz Ilg
- 1981: Patriz Ilg
- 1982: Patriz Ilg
- 1983: Rainer Schwarz
- 1984: Torsten Tiller
- 1985: Patriz Ilg
- 1986: Patriz Ilg
- 1987: Patriz Ilg
- 1988: Patriz Ilg
- 1989: Hubert Karl
- 1990: Michael Heist

=== 110 metres hurdles ===
- 1960: Martin Lauer
- 1961: Klaus Willimczik
- 1962: Klaus Nüske
- 1963: Klaus Willimczik
- 1964: Hinrich John
- 1965: Hinrich John
- 1966: Hinrich John
- 1967: Hinrich John
- 1968: Hinrich John
- 1969: Günther Nickel
- 1970: Günther Nickel
- 1971: Manfred Schumann
- 1972: Günther Nickel
- 1973: Eckart Berkes
- 1974: Manfred Schumann
- 1975: Dieter Gebhard
- 1976: Rolf Ziegler
- 1977: Dieter Gebhard
- 1978: Guido Kratschmer
- 1979: Karl-Werner Dönges
- 1980: Dieter Gebhard
- 1981: Karl-Werner Dönges
- 1982: Karl-Werner Dönges
- 1983: Axel Schaumann
- 1984: Peter Scholz
- 1985: Michael Radzey
- 1986: Siegfried Wentz
- 1987: Florian Schwarthoff
- 1988: Florian Schwarthoff
- 1989: Dietmar Koszewski
- 1990: Florian Schwarthoff

=== 200 metres hurdles ===
- 1960: Martin Lauer
- 1961: Klaus Gerbig
- 1962: Willi Holdorf
- 1963: Klaus Gerbig
- 1964: Joachim Hellmich
- 1965: Hinrich John

=== 400 metres hurdles ===
- 1960: Helmut Janz
- 1961: Helmut Janz
- 1962: Helmut Janz
- 1963: Helmut Janz
- 1964: Horst Gieseler
- 1965: Rainer Schubert
- 1966: Gerd Lossdörfer
- 1967: Rainer Schubert
- 1968: Rainer Schubert
- 1969: Rainer Schubert
- 1970: Werner Reibert
- 1971: Dieter Büttner
- 1972: Dieter Büttner
- 1973: Werner Reibert
- 1974: Rolf Ziegler
- 1975: Werner Reibert
- 1976: Rolf Ziegler
- 1977: Harald Schmid
- 1978: Harald Schmid
- 1979: Bernd Herrmann
- 1980: Harald Schmid
- 1981: Harald Schmid
- 1982: Harald Schmid
- 1983: Harald Schmid
- 1984: Harald Schmid
- 1985: Harald Schmid
- 1986: Harald Schmid
- 1987: Harald Schmid
- 1988: Harald Schmid
- 1989: Harald Schmid
- 1990: Carsten Köhrbrück

=== High jump ===
- 1960: Theo Püll
- 1961: Theo Püll
- 1962: Herbert Hopf
- 1963: Herbert Hopf
- 1964: Wolfgang Schillkowski
- 1965: Wolfgang Schillkowski
- 1966: Ingomar Sieghart
- 1967: Wolfgang Schillkowski
- 1968: Thomas Zacharias
- 1969: Ingomar Sieghart
- 1970: Hermann Magerl
- 1971: Günther Spielvogel
- 1972: Hermann Magerl
- 1973: Lothar Doster
- 1974: Walter Boller
- 1975: Walter Boller
- 1976: Walter Boller
- 1977: André Schneider-Laub
- 1978: André Schneider-Laub
- 1979: Gerd Nagel
- 1980: Dietmar Mögenburg
- 1981: Dietmar Mögenburg
- 1982: Dietmar Mögenburg
- 1983: Dietmar Mögenburg
- 1984: Dietmar Mögenburg
- 1985: Dietmar Mögenburg
- 1986: Carlo Thränhardt
- 1987: Dietmar Mögenburg
- 1988: Dietmar Mögenburg
- 1989: Dietmar Mögenburg
- 1990: Dietmar Mögenburg

=== Pole vault ===
- 1960: Klaus Lehnertz
- 1961: Klaus Lehnertz
- 1962: Dieter Möhring
- 1963: Wolfgang Reinhardt
- 1964: Wolfgang Reinhardt
- 1965: Wolfgang Reinhardt
- 1966: Klaus Lehnertz
- 1967: Klaus Lehnertz
- 1968: Klaus Lehnertz
- 1969: Heinfried Engel
- 1970: Volker Ohl
- 1971: Hans-Jürgen Ziegler
- 1972: Reinhard Kuretzky
- 1973: Volker Ohl
- 1974: Don Baird (AUS)
- 1975: Günther Lohre
- 1976: Günther Lohre
- 1977: Günther Lohre
- 1978: Günther Lohre
- 1979: Günther Lohre
- 1980: Günther Lohre
- 1981: Gerhard Schmidt
- 1982: Günther Lohre
- 1983: Günther Lohre
- 1984: Günther Lohre
- 1985: Jürgen Winkler
- 1986: Władysław Kozakiewicz
- 1987: Władysław Kozakiewicz
- 1988: Władysław Kozakiewicz
- 1989: Bernhard Zintl
- 1990: Bernhard Zintl

=== Long jump ===
- 1960: Manfred Steinbach
- 1961: Manfred Steinbach
- 1962: Manfred Steinbach
- 1963: Wolfgang Klein
- 1964: Wolfgang Klein
- 1965: Jörg Jüttner
- 1966: Hermann Latzel
- 1967: Uwe Töppner
- 1968: Hermann Latzel
- 1969: Reinhold Boschert
- 1970: Josef Schwarz
- 1971: Hans Baumgartner
- 1972: Hans Baumgartner
- 1973: Hans Baumgartner
- 1974: Hans Baumgartner
- 1975: Joachim Busse
- 1976: Hans-Jürgen Berger
- 1977: Jochen Verschl
- 1978: Jochen Verschl
- 1979: Jens Knipphals
- 1980: Jens Knipphals
- 1981: Joachim Busse
- 1982: Jörg Klocke
- 1983: Jürgen Hingsen
- 1984: Joachim Busse
- 1985: Jürgen Wörner
- 1986: Dietmar Haaf
- 1987: Dietmar Haaf
- 1988: Dietmar Haaf
- 1989: Dietmar Haaf
- 1990: Dietmar Haaf

=== Triple jump ===
- 1960: Heinz Schott
- 1961: Jörg Wischmeier
- 1962: Günther Zeiss
- 1963: Michael Sauer
- 1964: Michael Sauer
- 1965: Michael Sauer
- 1966: Günther Krivec
- 1967: Michael Sauer
- 1968: Michael Sauer
- 1969: Michael Sauer
- 1970: Michael Sauer
- 1971: Michael Sauer
- 1972: Richard Kick
- 1973: Richard Kick
- 1974: Joachim Kugler
- 1975: Joachim Kugler
- 1976: Wolfgang Kolmsee
- 1977: Klaus Kübler
- 1978: Dieter Eckert
- 1979: Douglas Henderson
- 1980: Klaus Kübler
- 1981: Peter Bouschen
- 1982: Douglas Henderson
- 1983: Peter Bouschen
- 1984: Ralf Jaros
- 1985: Ralf Jaros
- 1986: Peter Bouschen
- 1987: Peter Bouschen
- 1988: Wolfgang Knabe
- 1989: Wolfgang Zinser
- 1990: Ralf Jaros

=== Shot put ===
- 1960: Dieter Urbach
- 1961: Dieter Urbach
- 1962: Dieter Urbach
- 1963: Dieter Urbach
- 1964: Dieter Urbach
- 1965: Werner Heger
- 1966: Heinfried Birlenbach
- 1967: Heinfried Birlenbach
- 1968: Heinfried Birlenbach
- 1969: Heinfried Birlenbach
- 1970: Heinfried Birlenbach
- 1971: Heinfried Birlenbach
- 1972: Ralf Reichenbach
- 1973: Ralf Reichenbach
- 1974: Ralf Reichenbach
- 1975: Ralf Reichenbach
- 1976: Gerhard Steines
- 1977: Ralf Reichenbach
- 1978: Ralf Reichenbach
- 1979: Ralf Reichenbach
- 1980: Ralf Reichenbach
- 1981: Ralf Reichenbach
- 1982: Udo Gelhausen
- 1983: Claus-Dieter Föhrenbach
- 1984: Karsten Stolz
- 1985: Bernd Kneißler
- 1986: Karsten Stolz
- 1987: Karsten Stolz
- 1988: Karsten Stolz
- 1989: Karsten Stolz
- 1990: Kalman Konya

=== Discus throw ===
- 1960: Dieter Möhring
- 1961: Jens Reimers
- 1962: Jens Reimers
- 1963: Jens Reimers
- 1964: Josef Klik
- 1965: Jens Reimers
- 1966: Hein-Direck Neu
- 1967: Hein-Direck Neu
- 1968: Hein-Direck Neu
- 1969: Hein-Direck Neu
- 1970: Dirk Wippermann
- 1971: Klaus-Peter Hennig
- 1972: Dirk Wippermann
- 1973: Klaus-Peter Hennig
- 1974: Hein-Direck Neu
- 1975: Klaus-Peter Hennig
- 1976: Hein-Direck Neu
- 1977: Mac Wilkins (USA)
- 1978: Hein-Direck Neu
- 1979: Werner Hartmann
- 1980: Rolf Danneberg
- 1981: Alwin Wagner
- 1982: Alwin Wagner
- 1983: Alwin Wagner
- 1984: Alwin Wagner
- 1985: Alwin Wagner
- 1986: Alois Hannecker
- 1987: Alois Hannecker
- 1988: Rolf Danneberg
- 1989: Rolf Danneberg
- 1990: Wolfgang Schmidt

=== Hammer throw ===
- 1960: Siegfried Lorenz
- 1961: Hans Fahsl
- 1962: Hans Fahsl
- 1963: Hans Fahsl
- 1964: Uwe Beyer
- 1965: Uwe Beyer
- 1966: Uwe Beyer
- 1967: Uwe Beyer
- 1968: Uwe Beyer
- 1969: Uwe Beyer
- 1970: Uwe Beyer
- 1971: Uwe Beyer
- 1972: Edwin Klein
- 1973: Karl-Hans Riehm
- 1974: Edwin Klein
- 1975: Karl-Hans Riehm
- 1976: Karl-Hans Riehm
- 1977: Karl-Hans Riehm
- 1978: Karl-Hans Riehm
- 1979: Karl-Hans Riehm
- 1980: Karl-Hans Riehm
- 1981: Karl-Hans Riehm
- 1982: Klaus Ploghaus
- 1983: Karl-Hans Riehm
- 1984: Karl-Hans Riehm
- 1985: Christoph Sahner
- 1986: Christoph Sahner
- 1987: Jörg Schäfer
- 1988: Heinz Weis
- 1989: Heinz Weis
- 1990: Heinz Weis

=== Javelin throw ===
- 1960: Hermann Salomon
- 1961: Rolf Herings
- 1962: Hermann Salomon
- 1963: Hermann Salomon
- 1964: Hermann Salomon
- 1965: Rolf Herings
- 1966: Eugen Stumpp
- 1967: Hermann Salomon
- 1968: Hermann Salomon
- 1969: Klaus Wolfermann
- 1970: Klaus Wolfermann
- 1971: Klaus Wolfermann
- 1972: Klaus Wolfermann
- 1973: Klaus Wolfermann
- 1974: Klaus Wolfermann
- 1975: Jörg Hein
- 1976: Michael Wessing
- 1977: Michael Wessing
- 1978: Michael Wessing
- 1979: Michael Wessing
- 1980: Michael Wessing
- 1981: Helmut Schreiber
- 1982: Klaus Tafelmeier
- 1983: Klaus Tafelmeier
- 1984: Klaus Tafelmeier
- 1985: Klaus Tafelmeier
- 1986: Wolfram Gambke
- 1987: Klaus Tafelmeier
- 1988: Peter Blank
- 1989: Klaus-Peter Schneider
- 1990: Peter Blank

=== Pentathlon ===
- 1960: Hermann Salomon
- 1961: Hermann Salomon
- 1962: Hermann Salomon
- 1963: Gerold Jericho
- 1964: Hermann Salomon
- 1965: Horst Kley
- 1966: Kurt Bendlin
- 1967: Herbert Swoboda
- 1968: Horst Kley
- 1969: Wolfgang Tilly
- 1970: Erich Klamma
- 1971: Kurt Bendlin
- 1972: Manfred Bock
- 1973: Günther Grube

=== Decathlon ===
- 1960: Peter Gerber
- 1961: Willi Holdorf
- 1962: Manfred Bock
- 1963: Willi Holdorf
- 1964: Hans-Joachim Walde
- 1965: Kurt Bendlin
- 1966: Werner von Moltke
- 1967: Kurt Bendlin
- 1968: Werner von Moltke
- 1969: Hans-Joachim Walde
- 1970: Horst Beyer
- 1971: Kurt Bendlin
- 1972: Horst Beyer
- 1973: Herbert Swoboda
- 1974: Kurt Bendlin
- 1975: Guido Kratschmer
- 1976: Guido Kratschmer
- 1977: Guido Kratschmer
- 1978: Guido Kratschmer
- 1979: Guido Kratschmer
- 1980: Guido Kratschmer
- 1981: Andreas Rizzi
- 1982: Jürgen Hingsen
- 1983: Siegfried Wentz
- 1984: Abandoned
- 1985: Siegfried Wentz
- 1986: Jens Schulze
- 1987: Michael Neugebauer
- 1988: Rainer Sonnenburg
- 1989: Karl-Heinz Fichtner
- 1990: Michael Kohnle

=== 20 kilometres walk ===
- 1960: Claus Biethan
- 1961: Wolfgang Döring
- 1962: Karl-Heinz Pape
- 1963: Julius Müller
- 1964: Hannes Koch
- 1965: Hannes Koch
- 1966: Karl-Heinz Pape
- 1967: Karl-Heinz Pape
- 1968: Bernhard Nermerich
- 1969: Julius Müller
- 1970: Bernhard Nermerich
- 1971: Wilfried Wesch
- 1972: Bernd Kannenberg
- 1973: Gerhard Weidner
- 1974: Bernd Kannenberg
- 1975: Bernd Kannenberg
- 1976: Gerhard Weidner
- 1977: Gerhard Weidner
- 1978: Alfons Schwarz
- 1979: Gerhard Weidner
- 1980: Heinrich Schubert
- 1981: Alfons Schwarz
- 1982: Alfons Schwarz
- 1983: Franz-Josef Weber
- 1984: Alfons Schwarz
- 1985: Alfons Schwarz
- 1986: Wolfgang Wiedemann
- 1987: Volkmar Scholz
- 1988: Torsten Zervas
- 1989: Volkmar Scholz
- 1990: Robert Ihly

=== 50 kilometres walk ===
- 1960: Claus Biethan
- 1961: Heinz Mayr
- 1962: Julius Müller
- 1963: Gert Jannsen
- 1964: Bernhard Nermerich
- 1965: Karl-Heinz Pape
- 1966: Gerhard Weidner
- 1967: Bernhard Nermerich
- 1968: Bernhard Nermerich
- 1969: Bernhard Nermerich
- 1970: Peter Schuster
- 1971: Bernhard Nermerich
- 1972: Bernd Kannenberg
- 1973: Bernd Kannenberg
- 1974: Gerhard Weidner
- 1975: Bernd Kannenberg
- 1976: Gerhard Weidner
- 1977: Gerhard Weidner
- 1978: Hans Binder
- 1979: Hans Binder
- 1980: Heinrich Schubert
- 1981: Karl Degener
- 1982: Karl Degener
- 1983: Karl Degener
- 1984: Walter Schwoche
- 1985: Hans-Joachim Matern
- 1986: Alfons Schwarz
- 1987: Alfons Schwarz
- 1988: Alfons Schwarz
- 1989: Robert Ihly
- 1990: Robert Ihly

=== Cross country (long course) ===
- 1960: Ludwig Müller
- 1961: Horst Flosbach
- 1962: Peter Kubicki
- 1963: Peter Kubicki
- 1964: Harald Norpoth
- 1965: Hans Hüneke
- 1966: Manfred Letzerich
- 1967: Lutz Philipp
- 1968: Manfred Letzerich
- 1969: Lutz Philipp
- 1970: Lutz Philipp
- 1971: Lutz Philipp
- 1972: Lutz Philipp
- 1973: Lutz Philipp
- 1974: Detlef Uhlemann
- 1975: Detlef Uhlemann
- 1976: Edmundo Warnke
- 1977: Edmundo Warnke
- 1978: Edmundo Warnke
- 1979: Christoph Herle
- 1980: Christoph Herle
- 1981: Christoph Herle
- 1982: Ralf Salzmann
- 1983: Hans-Jürgen Orthmann
- 1984: Hans-Jürgen Orthmann
- 1985: Christoph Herle
- 1986: Werner Grommisch
- 1987: Konrad Dobler
- 1988: Christoph Herle
- 1989: Herbert Steffny
- 1990: Detlef Schwarz

=== Cross country (short course) ===
- 1961: Wilhelm-Rüdiger Böhme
- 1962: Karl Eyerkaufer
- 1963: Bernd Windel
- 1964: Bodo Tümmler
- 1965: Bodo Tümmler
- 1966: Harald Norpoth
- 1967: Harald Norpoth
- 1968: Harald Norpoth
- 1969: Jürgen May
- 1970: Harald Norpoth
- 1971: Harald Norpoth
- 1972: Harald Norpoth
- 1973: Willi Maier
- 1974: Wolfgang Riesinger
- 1975: Günther Kohl
- 1976: Günther Zahn
- 1977: Günther Zahn
- 1978: Günther Zahn
- 1979: Manfred Schoeneberg
- 1980: Hans-Jürgen Orthmann
- 1981: Patriz Ilg
- 1982: Uwe Mönkemeyer
- 1983: Uwe Mönkemeyer
- 1984: Uwe Mönkemeyer
- 1985: Uwe Becker
- 1986: Volker Welzel
- 1987: Daniel Gottschall
- 1988: Uwe Mönkemeyer
- 1989: Miroslaw Kuziola
- 1990: Ralf Eckert

=== Mountain running ===
- 1985: Peter Zipfel
- 1986: Michael Scheytt
- 1987: Michael Scheytt
- 1988: Karl-Heinz Doll
- 1989: Karl-Heinz Doll
- 1990: Wolfgang Münzel

== Women ==
=== 100 metres ===
- 1960: Anni Biechl
- 1961: Maren Collin
- 1962: Jutta Heine
- 1963: Gudrun Lenze
- 1964: Renate Meyer
- 1965: Erika Pollmann
- 1966: Hannelore Trabert
- 1967: Karin Reichert-Frisch
- 1968: Ingrid Becker
- 1969: Bärbel Hähnle
- 1970: Ingrid Becker
- 1971: Elfgard Schittenhelm
- 1972: Elfgard Schittenhelm
- 1973: Elfgard Schittenhelm
- 1974: Annegret Richter
- 1975: Inge Helten
- 1976: Annegret Richter
- 1977: Elvira Possekel
- 1978: Birgit Wilkes
- 1979: Annegret Richter
- 1980: Annegret Richter
- 1981: Monika Hirsch
- 1982: Resi März
- 1983: Sabine Klösters
- 1984: Heidi-Elke Gaugel
- 1985: Heidi-Elke Gaugel
- 1986: Heidi-Elke Gaugel
- 1987: Ulrike Sarvari
- 1988: Ulrike Sarvari
- 1989: Ulrike Sarvari
- 1990: Ulrike Sarvari

=== 200 metres ===
- 1960: Brunhilde Hendrix
- 1961: Jutta Heine
- 1962: Jutta Heine
- 1963: Jutta Heine
- 1964: Erika Pollmann
- 1965: Erika Pollmann
- 1966: Kirsten Roggenkamp
- 1967: Hannelore Trabert
- 1968: Rita Wilden
- 1969: Rita Wilden
- 1970: Elfgard Schittenhelm
- 1971: Rita Wilden
- 1972: Annegret Kroniger
- 1973: Annegret Kroniger
- 1974: Annegret Richter
- 1975: Maren Gang
- 1976: Annegret Richter
- 1977: Dagmar Schenten
- 1978: Annegret Richter
- 1979: Annegret Richter
- 1980: Annegret Richter
- 1981: Claudia Steger
- 1982: Heike Schulte-Mattler
- 1983: Christina Sussiek
- 1984: Heidi-Elke Gaugel
- 1985: Heidi-Elke Gaugel
- 1986: Heidi-Elke Gaugel
- 1987: Ulrike Sarvari & Ute Thimm
- 1988: Andrea Thomas
- 1989: Andrea Thomas
- 1990: Silke-Beate Knoll

=== 400 metres ===
- 1960: Maria Jeibmann
- 1961: Maria Jeibmann
- 1962: Helga Henning
- 1963: Helga Henning
- 1964: Erna Maisack
- 1965: Antje Gleichfeld
- 1966: Helga Henning
- 1967: Gisela Köpke
- 1968: Helga Henning
- 1969: Christel Frese
- 1970: Christel Frese
- 1971: Inge Bödding
- 1972: Rita Wilden
- 1973: Rita Wilden
- 1974: Rita Wilden
- 1975: Rita Wilden
- 1976: Rita Wilden
- 1977: Dagmar Fuhrmann
- 1978: Gaby Bußmann
- 1979: Elke Decker
- 1980: Gaby Bußmann
- 1981: Ute Thimm
- 1982: Gaby Bußmann
- 1983: Gaby Bußmann
- 1984: Ute Thimm
- 1985: Gisela Kinzel
- 1986: Gisela Kinzel
- 1987: Ute Thimm
- 1988: Helga Arendt
- 1989: Helga Arendt
- 1990: Karin Janke

=== 800 metres ===
- 1960: Vera Kummerfeldt
- 1961: Antje Gleichfeld
- 1962: Vera Kummerfeldt
- 1963: Antje Gleichfeld
- 1964: Antje Gleichfeld
- 1965: Antje Gleichfeld
- 1966: Antje Gleichfeld
- 1967: Karin Kessler
- 1968: Karin Kessler
- 1969: Anita Rottmüller
- 1970: Hildegard Falck
- 1971: Hildegard Falck
- 1972: Sylvia Schenk
- 1973: Hildegard Falck
- 1974: Gisela Ellenberger
- 1975: Ellen Tittel
- 1976: Brigitte Kraus
- 1977: Ursula Hook
- 1978: Elisabeth Schacht
- 1979: Ursula Hook
- 1980: Margrit Klinger
- 1981: Margrit Klinger
- 1982: Margrit Klinger
- 1983: Margit Schultheiss
- 1984: Margrit Klinger
- 1985: Margrit Klinger
- 1986: Gaby Bußmann
- 1987: Margrit Klinger
- 1988: Gabriela Lesch
- 1989: Gabriela Lesch
- 1990: Gabriela Lesch

=== 1500 metres ===
- 1968: Gerda Ranz
- 1969: Gerda Ranz
- 1970: Ellen Tittel
- 1971: Ellen Tittel
- 1972: Ellen Tittel
- 1973: Ellen Tittel
- 1974: Ellen Tittel
- 1975: Ellen Tittel
- 1976: Brigitte Kraus
- 1977: Jan Merrill (USA)
- 1978: Brigitte Kraus
- 1979: Brigitte Kraus
- 1980: Elisabeth Schacht
- 1981: Brigitte Kraus
- 1982: Martina Krott
- 1983: Brigitte Kraus
- 1984: Margrit Klinger
- 1985: Brigitte Kraus
- 1986: Brigitte Kraus
- 1987: Brigitte Kraus
- 1988: Vera Michallek
- 1989: Gabriele Schwarzbauer
- 1990: Vera Michallek

=== 3000 metres ===
- 1973: Christa Merten
- 1974: Gudrun Hodey
- 1975: Ellen Tittel
- 1976: Brigitte Kraus
- 1977: Brigitte Kraus
- 1978: Birgit Friedmann
- 1979: Brigitte Kraus
- 1980: Birgit Friedmann
- 1981: Birgit Friedmann
- 1982: Birgit Friedmann
- 1983: Brigitte Kraus
- 1984: Brigitte Kraus
- 1985: Brigitte Kraus
- 1986: Brigitte Kraus
- 1987: Brigitte Kraus
- 1988: Vera Michallek
- 1989: Claudia Lokar
- 1990: Claudia Metzner

=== 10,000 metres ===
- 1983: Charlotte Teske
- 1984: Charlotte Teske
- 1985: Charlotte Teske
- 1986: Kerstin Preßler
- 1987: Kerstin Preßler
- 1988: Kerstin Preßler
- 1989: Iris Biba
- 1990: Kerstin Preßler

=== 15K run ===
- 1988: Christa Vahlensieck
- 1989: Iris Biba
- 1990: Kerstin Preßler

=== 25K run ===
- 1977: Christa Vahlensieck
- 1978: Christa Vahlensieck
- 1979: Christa Vahlensieck
- 1980: Christa Vahlensieck
- 1981: Charlotte Teske
- 1982: Monika Lövenich
- 1983: Charlotte Teske
- 1984: Vera Michallek
- 1985: Charlotte Teske
- 1986: Kerstin Preßler
- 1987: Christina Mai

=== Marathon ===
- 1975: Christa Vahlensieck
- 1976: Christa Vahlensieck
- 1977: Christa Vahlensieck
- 1978: Christa Vahlensieck
- 1979: Liane Winter
- 1980: Christa Vahlensieck
- 1981: Charlotte Teske
- 1982: Monika Lövenich
- 1983: Monika Lövenich
- 1984: Susi Riermeier
- 1985: Charlotte Teske
- 1986: Heidi Hutterer
- 1987: Monika Lövenich
- 1988: Charlotte Teske
- 1989: Birgit Lennartz
- 1990: Gabriele Wolf

=== 100K run ===
- 1987: Hanni Zehendner
- 1988: Birgit Lennartz
- 1989: Birgit Lennartz
- 1990: Birgit Lennartz

=== 80 metres hurdles ===
- 1960: Zenta Gastl-Kopp
- 1961: Erika Fisch
- 1962: Erika Fisch
- 1963: Erika Fisch
- 1964: Inge Schell
- 1965: Inge Schell
- 1966: Karin Reichert-Frisch
- 1967: Inge Schell
- 1968: Inge Schell

=== 100 metres hurdles ===
- 1968: Burgl Waneck
- 1969: Heide Rosendahl
- 1970: Margit Bach
- 1971: Margit Bach
- 1972: Heidi Schüller
- 1973: Uta Nolte
- 1974: Marlies Koschinski
- 1975: Silvia Kempin
- 1976: Silvia Kempin
- 1977: Silvia Kempin
- 1978: Silvia Kempin
- 1979: Doris Baum
- 1980: Silvia Kempin
- 1981: Silvia Kempin
- 1982: Heike Filsinger
- 1983: Ulrike Denk & Heike Filsinger
- 1984: Ulrike Denk
- 1985: Ulrike Denk
- 1986: Edith Oker
- 1987: Claudia Zaczkiewicz
- 1988: Claudia Zaczkiewicz
- 1989: Claudia Zaczkiewicz
- 1990: Gabi Roth

=== 400 metres hurdles ===
- 1975: Erika Weinstein
- 1976: Silvia Hollmann
- 1977: Erika Weinstein
- 1978: Silvia Hollmann
- 1979: Silvia Hollmann
- 1980: Silvia Hollmann
- 1981: Sylvia Nagel
- 1982: Marlies Gutewort
- 1983: Mary Wagner
- 1984: Marlies Harnes
- 1985: Sabine Everts
- 1986: Gudrun Abt
- 1987: Gudrun Abt
- 1988: Gudrun Abt
- 1989: Ulrike Heinz
- 1990: Silvia Rieger

=== High jump ===
- 1960: Marlene Schmitz-Portz
- 1961: Ilia Hans
- 1962: Ingrid Becker
- 1963: Marlene Schmitz-Portz
- 1964: Marlene Schmitz-Portz
- 1965: Marlene Schmitz-Portz
- 1966: Friederun Valk
- 1967: Hannelore Görtz
- 1968: Charlotte Marx
- 1969: Renate Gärtner
- 1970: Karen Mack
- 1971: Renate Gärtner
- 1972: Ellen Mundinger
- 1973: Ulrike Meyfarth
- 1974: Karin Wagner
- 1975: Ulrike Meyfarth
- 1976: Brigitte Holzapfel
- 1977: Marlis Wilken
- 1978: Brigitte Holzapfel
- 1979: Ulrike Meyfarth
- 1980: Ulrike Meyfarth
- 1981: Ulrike Meyfarth
- 1982: Ulrike Meyfarth
- 1983: Ulrike Meyfarth
- 1984: Heike Henkel
- 1985: Heike Henkel
- 1986: Heike Henkel
- 1987: Heike Henkel
- 1988: Heike Henkel
- 1989: Andrea Baumert
- 1990: Heike Henkel

=== Long jump ===
- 1960: Zenta Gastl-Kopp
- 1961: Helga Hoffmann
- 1962: Helga Hoffmann
- 1963: Helga Hoffmann
- 1964: Helga Hoffmann
- 1965: Ursula Wittmann
- 1966: Helga Hoffmann
- 1967: Ingrid Becker
- 1968: Heide Rosendahl
- 1969: Heide Rosendahl
- 1970: Heide Rosendahl
- 1971: Heide Rosendahl
- 1972: Heide Rosendahl
- 1973: Edda Trocha
- 1974: Edda Trocha
- 1975: Christa Striezel
- 1976: Sabine Wecke
- 1977: Christa Striezel
- 1978: Karin Hänel
- 1979: Sabine Everts
- 1980: Sabine Everts
- 1981: Christina Sussiek
- 1982: Sabine Everts
- 1983: Christina Sussiek
- 1984: Anke Weigt
- 1985: Sabine Braun
- 1986: Monika Hirsch
- 1987: Andrea Breder
- 1988: Andrea Hannemann
- 1989: Annette Ganseforth
- 1990: Katrin Bartschat

=== Shot put ===
- 1960: Sigrun Grabert
- 1961: Sigrun Grabert
- 1962: Marlene Klein
- 1963: Sigrun Kofink
- 1964: Marlene Klein
- 1965: Marlene Klein
- 1966: Gertrud Schäfer
- 1967: Marlene Fuchs
- 1968: Marlene Fuchs
- 1969: Liesel Westermann
- 1970: Marlene Fuchs
- 1971: Marlene Fuchs
- 1972: Marlene Fuchs
- 1973: Brigitte Berendonk
- 1974: Eva Wilms
- 1975: Eva Wilms
- 1976: Eva Wilms
- 1977: Eva Wilms
- 1978: Eva Wilms
- 1979: Eva Wilms
- 1980: Eva Wilms
- 1981: Eva Wilms
- 1982: Claudia Losch
- 1983: Claudia Losch
- 1984: Claudia Losch
- 1985: Claudia Losch
- 1986: Claudia Losch
- 1987: Claudia Losch
- 1988: Claudia Losch
- 1989: Claudia Losch
- 1990: Claudia Losch

=== Discus throw ===
- 1960: Kriemhild Limberg
- 1961: Kriemhild Limberg
- 1962: Kriemhild Limberg
- 1963: Kriemhild Limberg
- 1964: Kriemhild Limberg
- 1965: Kriemhild Limberg
- 1966: Liesel Westermann
- 1967: Liesel Westermann
- 1968: Liesel Westermann
- 1969: Liesel Westermann
- 1970: Liesel Westermann
- 1971: Brigitte Berendonk
- 1972: Liesel Westermann
- 1973: Liesel Westermann
- 1974: Liesel Westermann
- 1975: Liesel Westermann
- 1976: Liesel Westermann
- 1977: Ingra Manecke
- 1978: Ingra Manecke
- 1979: Ingra Manecke
- 1980: Ingra Manecke
- 1981: Ingra Manecke
- 1982: Ingra Manecke
- 1983: Ingra Manecke
- 1984: Ingra Manecke
- 1985: Dagmar Galler
- 1986: Claudia Losch
- 1987: Barbara Beuge
- 1988: Dagmar Galler
- 1989: Dagmar Galler
- 1990: Ursula Kreutel

=== Javelin throw ===
- 1960: Erika Strößenreuther
- 1961: Anneliese Gerhards
- 1962: Anneliese Gerhards
- 1963: Anneliese Gerhards
- 1964: Anneliese Gerhards
- 1965: Anneliese Gerhards
- 1966: Anneliese Gerhards
- 1967: Ameli Koloska
- 1968: Ameli Koloska
- 1969: Ameli Koloska
- 1970: Ameli Koloska
- 1971: Anneliese Gerhards
- 1972: Ameli Koloska
- 1973: Ameli Koloska
- 1974: Ameli Koloska
- 1975: Ursula Pietschmann
- 1976: Marion Becker
- 1977: Marion Becker
- 1978: Eva Helmschmidt
- 1979: Ingrid Thyssen
- 1980: Ingrid Thyssen
- 1981: Ingrid Thyssen
- 1982: Ingrid Thyssen
- 1983: Ingrid Thyssen
- 1984: Ingrid Thyssen
- 1985: Beate Peters
- 1986: Beate Peters
- 1987: Ingrid Thyssen
- 1988: Ingrid Thyssen
- 1989: Brigitte Graune
- 1990: Brigitte Graune

=== Pentathlon ===
- 1960: Jutta Heine
- 1961: Helga Hoffmann
- 1962: Jutta Heine
- 1963: Helga Hoffmann
- 1964: Helga Hoffmann
- 1965: Renate Balck
- 1966: Heide Rosendahl
- 1967: Ingrid Becker
- 1968: Heide Rosendahl
- 1969: Karen Mack
- 1970: Heide Rosendahl
- 1971: Heide Rosendahl
- 1972: Heide Rosendahl
- 1973: Margot Eppinger
- 1974: Christel Voss
- 1975: Margot Eppinger
- 1976: Eva Wilms
- 1977: Eva Wilms
- 1978: Astrid Fredebold
- 1979: Beatrix Philipp
- 1980: Sabine Everts

=== Heptathlon ===
- 1981: Sabine Everts
- 1982: Sabine Everts
- 1983: Sabine Everts
- 1984: Anke Köninger
- 1985: Sabine Everts
- 1986: Birgit Dressel
- 1987: Cornelia Heinrich
- 1988: Sabine Everts
- 1989: Sabine Braun
- 1990: Birgit Clarius

=== 5 kilometres walk ===
The 1990 event was held on a track

- 1980: Monika Glöckler
- 1981: Ingrid Adam
- 1982: Monika Wassel
- 1983: Ingrid Adam
- 1984: Ingrid Adam
- 1985: Jutta Schwoche
- 1986: Renate Warz
- 1987: Not held
- 1988: Not held
- 1989: Not held
- 1990: Andrea Brückmann

=== 10 kilometres walk ===
- 1987: Cathrin Rudolph
- 1988: Barbara Kollorz
- 1989: Andrea Brückmann
- 1990: Renate Warz

=== Cross country (long course) ===
- 1970: Ellen Tittel
- 1971: Ellen Tittel
- 1972: Ellen Tittel
- 1973: Ellen Tittel
- 1974: Christa Kofferschläger
- 1975: Vera Kemper
- 1976: Vera Kemper
- 1977: Charlotte Teske
- 1978: Christa Vahlensieck
- 1979: Heide Brenner
- 1980: Ellen Tittel
- 1981: Monika Lövenich
- 1982: Charlotte Teske
- 1983: Charlotte Teske
- 1984: Monika Lövenich
- 1985: Charlotte Teske
- 1986: Charlotte Teske
- 1987: Iris Biba
- 1988: Antje Winkelmann
- 1989: Iris Biba
- 1990: Uta Pippig

=== Cross country (short course) ===
- 1960: Josefine Bongartz
- 1961: Edith Schiller
- 1962: Antje Gleichfeld
- 1963: Anita Wörner
- 1964: Antje Gleichfeld
- 1965: Antje Gleichfeld
- 1966: Antje Gleichfeld
- 1967: Karin Kessler
- 1968: Anita Rottmüller
- 1969: Maria Strickling
- 1970: Christa Merten
- 1971: Ellen Tittel
- 1972: Ellen Tittel
- 1973: Ellen Tittel
- 1974: Sylvia Schenk
- 1975: Ellen Tittel
- 1976: Sabine Greiner
- 1977: Monika Greschner
- 1978: Monika Greschner
- 1979: Ellen Tittel
- 1980: Ellen Tittel
- 1981: Brigitte Kraus
- 1982: Brigitte Kraus
- 1983: Brigitte Kraus
- 1984: Brigitte Kraus
- 1985: Christiane Finke
- 1986: Elisabeth Franzis
- 1987: Vera Michallek
- 1988: Ursula Starke
- 1989: Sabine Nolte
- 1990: Annette Hüls

=== Mountain running ===
- 1985: Christiane Fladt
- 1986: Olivia Grüner
- 1987: Christiane Fladt
- 1988: Birgit Lennartz
- 1989: Bernadette Hudy
- 1990: Birgit Lennartz
