= 1962 European Athletics Championships – Women's 800 metres =

Women's 800 metres at the European Athletics Championships
- Venue: JNA Stadium
- Location: Belgrade, Yugoslavia
- Dates: 15 September 1962 (heats); 16 September 1962 (final)
- Competitors: 19 from 11 nations
- Winning time: 2:02.8 min AR

Medalists
gold medal	Gerda Kraan	Netherlands
silver medal	Waltraud Kaufmann	East Germany
bronze medal	Olga Kazi	Hungary

The women's 800 metres at the 1962 European Athletics Championships was held at JNA Stadium in Belgrade, then Yugoslavia, on 15 and 16 September 1962.

== Results ==
=== Heats ===
The preliminary heats were held on 15 September.

Results of the first heat
Rank	Name	Nationality	Time	Notes
1	Gerda Kraan	Netherlands	2:06.3	CR Q
2	Vera Mukhanova	Soviet Union	2:08.3	Q
3	Phyllis Perkins	Great Britain	2:08.4	
4	Ilse Schönemann	East Germany	2:09.4	
5	Gizella Sasvári	Hungary	2:11.1	
6	Maeve Kyle	Ireland	2:13.0	NR
7	Elisabeta Teodorof	Romania	2:13.6	

Results of the second heat
Rank	Name	Nationality	Time	Notes
1	Joy Jordan	Great Britain	2:07.4	Q
2	Waltraud Kaufmann	East Germany	2:07.7	Q
3	Lyudmila Lysenko	Soviet Union	2:08.4	
4	Florica Grecescu	Romania	2:08.8	
5	Milica Rajkov	Yugoslavia	2:16.5	

Results of the third heat
Rank	Name	Nationality	Time	Notes
1	Olga Kazi	Hungary	2:08.1	Q
2	Krystyna Nowakowska	Poland	2:08.1	Q
3	Tamara Dmitriyeva	Soviet Union	2:08.9	
4	Anita Wörner	West Germany	2:09.5	
5	Madeline Ibbotson	Great Britain	2:09.7	
6	Jannie van Eyck-Vos	Netherlands	2:11.3	
7	Gilda Jannacone	Italy	2:13.6	

=== Final ===
The final was held on 16 September.

Results of the final
Rank	Name	Nationality	Time	Notes
1st place, gold medalist(s)	Gerda Kraan	Netherlands	2:02.8	AR
2nd place, silver medalist(s)	Waltraud Kaufmann	East Germany	2:05.0	NR
3rd place, bronze medalist(s)	Olga Kazi	Hungary	2:05.0	NR
4	Joy Jordan	Great Britain	2:05.0	NR
5	Krystyna Nowakowska	Poland	2:05.8	NR
6	Vera Mukhanova	Soviet Union	2:07.2	
