= Athletics at the 1964 Summer Olympics – Women's 800 metres =

Women's 800 metres at the Games of the XVIII Olympiad
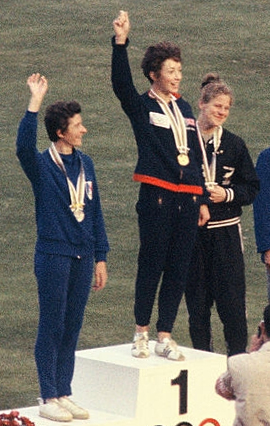
- Maryvonne Dupureur, Ann Packer and Marise Chamberlain on the podium
- Venue: Olympic Stadium
- Dates: 18–20 October 1964
- Competitors: 24 from 16 nations
- Winning time: 2:01.1 WR

Medalists
1st place, gold medalist(s)		Ann Packer	Great Britain
2nd place, silver medalist(s)		Maryvonne Dupureur	France
3rd place, bronze medalist(s)		Marise Chamberlain	New Zealand

Official Video Highlights

The women's 800 metres was the longest of the four women's track races in the Athletics at the 1964 Summer Olympics program in Tokyo. It was held on 18 October, 19 October, and 20 October 1964. 24 athletes from 16 nations entered, with 1 not starting the first round. The first round was held on 18 October, the semifinals on 19 October, and the final on 20 October.

The 1964 race was run with the contemporary break after a single turn, a style that changed and was reverted over the next decade and a half.

== Results ==
=== First round ===
The top five runners in each of the 3 heats advanced, as well as the next fastest runner from across the heats.

==== Heat 1 ====
All three of the eventual medallists were in the first heat.

Place	Athlete	Nation	Time
1	Maryvonne Dupureur	France	2:04.5
2	Marise Chamberlain	New Zealand	2:06.8
3	Zsuzsa Szabó	Hungary	2:07.7
4	Vera Mukhanova	Soviet Union	2:08.8
5	Ann Packer	Great Britain	2:12.6
6	Waltraud Kaufmann	United Team of Germany	2:14.6
7	Jette Andersen	Denmark	2:15.2
8	Abby Hoffman	Canada	2:17.4

==== Heat 2 ====
Place	Athlete	Nation	Time
1	Mary Hodson	Great Britain	2:08.5
2	Anita Wörner	United Team of Germany	2:08.6
3	Zoya Skobtsova	Soviet Union	2:08.6
4	Gerda Kraan	Netherlands	2:09.8
5	Maeve Kyle	Ireland	2:11.3
6	Sandy Knott	United States	2:12.2
7	Aldaanish Ramazan	Mongolia	2:21.1
—	Dixie Willis	Australia	Did not start

==== Heat 3 ====
Place	Athlete	Nation	Time
1	Anne Smith	Great Britain	2:08.0
2	Antje Gleichfeld	United Team of Germany	2:08.2
3	Laine Erik	Soviet Union	2:08.3
4	Gizela Farkaš	Yugoslavia	2:08.7
5	Jannie van Eyck-Vos	Netherlands	2:09.1
6	Olga Kazi	Hungary	2:12.1
7	Masako Kisaki	Japan	2:18.6
8	Han Myung Hee	South Korea	2:22.7

=== Semifinals ===
The top four runners in each semifinal advanced to the final.

==== Semifinal 1 ====
Place	Athlete	Nation	Time
1	Maryvonne Dupureur	France	2:04.1 OR
2	Antje Gleichfeld	United Team of Germany	2:04.6
3	Laine Erik	Soviet Union	2:04.7
4	Anne Smith	Great Britain	2:04.8
5	Vera Mukhanova	Soviet Union	2:04.8
6	Jannie van Eyck-Vos	Netherlands	2:05.7
7	Mary Hodson	Great Britain	2:07.1
8	Olga Kazi	Hungary	2:10.2

==== Semifinal 2 ====
Place	Athlete	Nation	Time
1	Marise Chamberlain	New Zealand	2:04.6
2	Zsuzsa Szabó	Hungary	2:05.1
3	Ann Packer	Great Britain	2:06.0
4	Gerda Kraan	Netherlands	2:06.2
5	Anita Wörner	United Team of Germany	2:07.1
6	Zoya Skobtsova	Soviet Union	2:07.4
7	Gizela Farkaš	Yugoslavia	2:09.9
8	Maeve Kyle	Ireland	2:12.9

=== Final ===
After winning a silver medal in the 400 metres Ann Packer had no plans to run in the 800 metres and had a shopping trip planned until her fiancé, Robbie Brightwell, finished fourth in the 400 metres. Disappointed for him, she turned to the 800 metres, an event which she had only raced in five times before.

Packer, who had placed fifth in her first round heat and third in her semifinal, started the final as the second slowest of the eight contestants.

After the break in the final Zsuzsa Szabó took the lead with Maryvonne Dupureur and Antje Gleichfeld in close order behind her. Coming off the second turn Dupureur took the lead. At the bell she accelerated further. Packer was sixth at 400 metres, tagging along at the back of the pack behind Dupureur. Along the backstretch, Dupureur opened a gap which she extended through the final turn, five girls hit the 600 mark virtually shoulder to shoulder, with Packer a step behind the wall. Laine Erik was the outside of the wall but had more speed through the turn, the only one in the field looking to have enough speed to try to make progress on the now five metre lead of Dupureur.

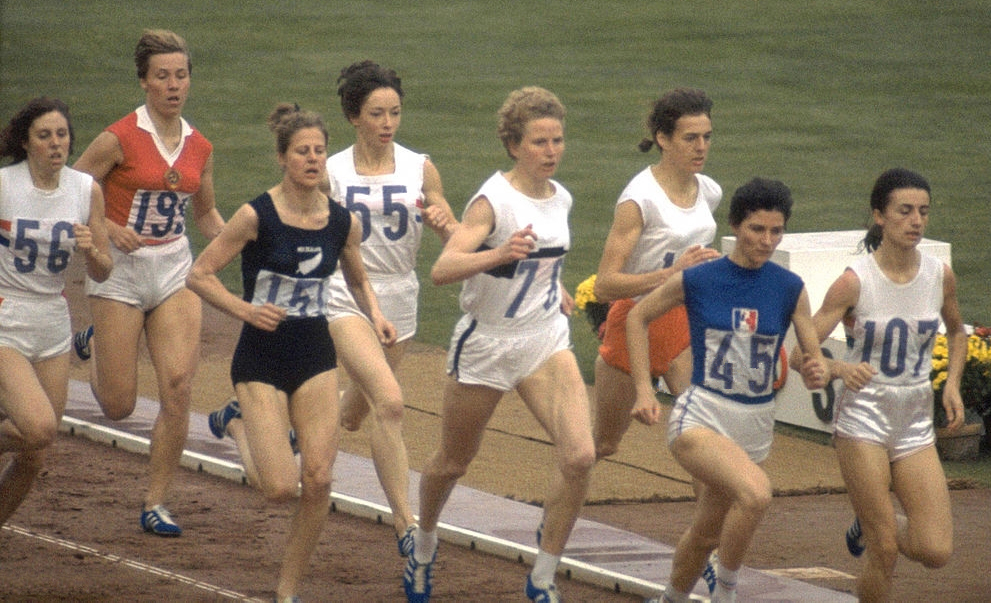
Final. Left-right: Anne Smith, Laine Erik, Marise Chamberlain, Ann Packer, Antje Gleichfeld, Gerda Kraan, Maryvonne Dupureur, Zsuzsa Szabó

Suddenly halfway through the final turn, Packer launched into a sprint, running around the other competitors. She took the lead in the final straight, her sprinting speed taking her past Dupureur in a completely different gear to take the gold medal in world record time. The first five runners beat the Olympic record time (set by Dupureur in the semifinals).

Place	Athlete	Nation	Time
1	Ann Packer	Great Britain	2:01.1 WR
2	Maryvonne Dupureur	France	2:01.9
3	Marise Chamberlain	New Zealand	2:02.8
4	Zsuzsa Szabó	Hungary	2:03.5
5	Antje Gleichfeld	United Team of Germany	2:03.9
6	Laine Erik	Soviet Union	2:05.1
7	Gerda Kraan	Netherlands	2:05.8
8	Anne Smith	Great Britain	2:05.8
