= Athletics at the 1960 Summer Olympics – Women's 800 metres =

Women's 800 metres at the Games of the XVII Olympiad
- Venue: Olympic Stadium
- Dates: September 6, 1960 (heats); September 7, 1960 (final)
- Competitors: 27 from 15 nations
- Winning time: 2:04.5 WR

Medalists
1st place, gold medalist(s)		Lyudmila Lysenko; Soviet Union
2nd place, silver medalist(s)		Brenda Jones; Australia
3rd place, bronze medalist(s)		Ursula Donath; United Team of Germany

Video on YouTube Official Video

The women's 800 metres middle distance event at the 1960 Olympic Games took place between September 6 and September 7. This was the return of the event for the first time since 1928.

Dixie Willis had the best time in qualifying, thus the Olympic record, though Lyudmila Lysenko (née Shevtsova) had set the world record a month earlier in Moscow. In the final, Willis took the race out, marked by Shevtsova. By the final straightaway, Brenda Jones was also with Shevtsova and looking fast challenging Willis for the lead. Suddenly Willis stepped on the curb and fell off the track into the infield. Shevtsova edged into the lead and dipped at the finish to equal her own world record and take the gold in 2:04.3. Jones was electronically timed at being .08 behind though electronic timing would not become official for another 17 years. Ursula Donath was the lucky (somewhat unified) German who was a step behind the top three when Willis exited to get the bronze. Less than two years later, Wilis would improve the world record by three seconds.

== Results ==
=== Heats ===
The top two runners in each of the four heats (blue) and the next fastest one (pink) advanced to the final round.

==== Heat 1 ====
Rank	Athlete	Nation	Time	Notes
1	Antje Gleichfeld	United Team of Germany	2:11.05	OR
2	Brenda Jones	Australia	2:11.14	
3	Zinaida Matistovich	Soviet Union	2:11.57	
4	Maryvonne Dupureur	France	2:12.42	
5	Diane Charles	Great Britain	2:14.24	
6	Zofia Walasek	Poland	2:16.44	
7	Lee Hak-ja	South Korea	2:28.4	
	Tsvetana Isaeva	Bulgaria	DNS	

==== Heat 2 ====
Rank	Athlete	Nation	Time	Notes
1	Ursula Donath	United Team of Germany	2:07.92	OR
2	Beata Żbikowska	Poland	2:09.57	
3	Florica Grecescu	Romania	2:10.10	
4	Olga Kazi	Hungary	2:11.07	
5	Gilda Jannaccone	Italy	2:13.72	
6	Phyllis Perkins	Great Britain	2:15.41	
	Pat Daniels	United States	DQ	
	Stephie D'Souza	India	DNS	

==== Heat 3 ====
Rank	Athlete	Nation	Time	Notes
1	Lyudmila Lysenko	Soviet Union	2:09.31	
2	Gizella Sasvári-Csóka	Hungary	2:09.77	
3	Krystyna Nowakowska	Poland	2”09.81	
4	Eleanor Haslam	Canada	2:10.17	
5	Bedřiška Kulhavá	Czechoslovakia	2:10.23	
6	Gerda Kraan	Netherlands	2:10.71	
7	Nicole Goullieux	France	2:13.53	

==== Heat 4 ====
Rank	Athlete	Nation	Time	Notes
1	Dixie Willis	Australia	2:06.03	OR
2	Joy Jordan	Great Britain	2:07.29	
3	Vera Kummerfeldt	United Team of Germany	2:07.34	
4	Yekaterina Parlyuk	Soviet Union	2:07.71	
5	Ine ter Laak-Spijk	Netherlands	2:10.36	
6	Gül Çiray	Turkey	2:11.55	
	Ursula Brodbeck	Switzerland	DNS	
	Sebastiana Alvarado	Mexico	DNS	

=== Final ===
Rank	Athlete	Nation	Time	Notes
1st place, gold medalist(s)	Lyudmila Lysenko	Soviet Union	2:04.50	WR
2nd place, silver medalist(s)	Brenda Jones	Australia	2:04.58	
3rd place, bronze medalist(s)	Ursula Donath	United Team of Germany	2:05.73	
4	Vera Kummerfeldt	United Team of Germany	2:06.07	
5	Antje Gleichfeld	United Team of Germany	2:06.63	
6	Joy Jordan	Great Britain	2:07.95	
7	Gizella Sasvári-Csóka	Hungary	2:08.11	
8	Beata Żbikowska	Poland	2:11.91	
	Dixie Willis	Australia	DNF	

Key: WR = world record; OR = Olympic record; DNF = did not finish; DQ = disqualified
