= 1966 European Athletics Championships – Women's 800 metres =

Women's 800 metres at the European Athletics Championships

The women's 800 metres at the 1966 European Athletics Championships was held in Budapest, Hungary, at Népstadion on 2, 3, and 4 September 1966.

== Medalists ==
Gold	Vera Nikolić; Yugoslavia
Silver	Zsuzsa Szabó; Hungary
Bronze	Antje Gleichfeld; West Germany

== Results ==
=== Final ===
4 September

Rank	Name	Nationality	Time	Notes
1st place, gold medalist(s)	Vera Nikolić	Yugoslavia	2:02.8	=CR, NR
2nd place, silver medalist(s)	Zsuzsa Szabó	Hungary	2:03.1	NR
3rd place, bronze medalist(s)	Antje Gleichfeld	West Germany	2:03.7	NR
4	Pam Piercy	Great Britain	2:04.1	
5	Alla Krivoshchekova	Soviet Union	2:04.2	
6	Vera Mukhanova	Soviet Union	2:04.8	
7	Ilja Laman	Netherlands	2:05.2	
8	Waltraud Pöhlitz	East Germany	2:12.1	

=== Semi-finals ===
3 September

==== Semi-final 1 ====
Rank	Name	Nationality	Time	Notes
1	Vera Nikolić	Yugoslavia	2:04.2	Q
2	Antje Gleichfeld	West Germany	2:04.9	Q
3	Zsuzsa Szabó	Hungary	2:05.2	Q
4	Vera Mukhanova	Soviet Union	2:05.5	Q
5	Ileana Silai	Romania	2:08.0	
6	Karin Kessler	West Germany	2:08.0	
7	Patricia Lowe	Great Britain	2:08.4	
	Regina Kleinau	East Germany	DQ	

==== Semi-final 2 ====
Rank	Name	Nationality	Time	Notes
1	Waltraud Pöhlitz	East Germany	2:05.1	Q
2	Alla Krivoshchekova	Soviet Union	2:05.1	Q
3	Ilja Laman	Netherlands	2:05.4	Q
4	Pam Piercy	Great Britain	2:05.5	Q
5	Sára Szenteleki	Hungary	2:05.8	
6	Anita Wörner	West Germany	2:05.9	
7	Tamara Babincheva	Soviet Union	2:06.3	
8	Paola Pigni	Italy	2:09.2	

=== Heats ===
2 September

==== Heat 1 ====
Rank	Name	Nationality	Time	Notes
1	Vera Nikolić	Yugoslavia	2:08.5	Q
2	Waltraud Pöhlitz	East Germany	2:08.9	Q
3	Anita Wörner	West Germany	2:09.0	Q
4	Patricia Lowe	Great Britain	2:09.4	Q
5	Zofia Kaliszczuk	Poland	2:10.3	
6	Britt Ramstad	Norway	2:10.4	NR
7	Florentina Stancu	Romania	2:11.9	

==== Heat 2 ====
Rank	Name	Nationality	Time	Notes
1	Ilja Laman	Netherlands	2:08.8	Q
2	Ileana Silai	Romania	2:08.8	Q
3	Karin Kessler	West Germany	2:09.2	Q
4	Tamara Babincheva	Soviet Union	2:09.5	Q
5	Teresa Jędrak	Poland	2:09.9	
6	Jette Andersen	Denmark	2:10.0	
7	Katalin Nagy	Hungary	2:10.8	

==== Heat 3 ====
Rank	Name	Nationality	Time	Notes
1	Antje Gleichfeld	West Germany	2:05.5	Q
2	Alla Krivoshchekova	Soviet Union	2:05.6	Q
3	Sára Szenteleki	Hungary	2:05.6	Q
4	Regina Kleinau	East Germany	2:05.8	Q
5	Danuta Wierzbowska	Poland	2:06.1	
6	Marie Ingrova	Czechoslovakia	2:07.5	NR
7	Elisabeta Baciu	Romania	2:09.2	

==== Heat 4 ====
Rank	Name	Nationality	Time	Notes
1	Zsuzsa Szabó	Hungary	2:06.9	Q
2	Pam Piercy	Great Britain	2:07.2	Q
3	Vera Mukhanova	Soviet Union	2:07.3	Q
4	Paola Pigni	Italy	2:07.5	Q
5	Dobroslava Žáková	Czechoslovakia	2:09.5	
6	Francine Peyskens	Belgium	2:12.8	NR
7	Maeve Kyle	Ireland	2:13.2	
8	Adile Dani	Albania	2:13.2	NR

== Participation ==
According to an unofficial count, 29 athletes from 16 countries participated in the event.

- Albania (1)
- Belgium (1)
- Czechoslovakia (2)
- Denmark (1)
- East Germany (2)
- Hungary (3)
- Ireland (1)
- Italy (1)
- Netherlands (1)
- Norway (1)
- Poland (3)
- Romania (3)
- Soviet Union (3)
- Great Britain (2)
- West Germany (3)
- Yugoslavia (1)
