= 1966 European Indoor Games – Women's 800 metres =

The women's 800 metres event at the 1966 European Indoor Games was held on 27 March in Dortmund.

== Results ==
Rank	Name	Nationality	Time	Notes
1st place, gold medalist(s)	Zsuzsa Szabó-Nagy	Hungary	2:07.9	
2nd place, silver medalist(s)	Karin Kessler	West Germany	2:10.8	
3rd place, bronze medalist(s)	Marie Ingrová	Czechoslovakia	2:11.6	
4	Anni Pede	West Germany	2:12.9	
5	Jette Andersen	Denmark	2:13.8	
6	Ursula Brodbeck	Switzerland	2:17.4	
