= Athletics at the 1963 Summer Universiade – Women's 800 metres =

The women's 800 metres event at the 1963 Summer Universiade was held at the Estádio Olímpico Monumental in Porto Alegre in September 1963.

== Results ==
Rank	Athlete	Nationality	Time	Notes
1st place, gold medalist(s)	Olga Kazi	Hungary	2:05.9	
2nd place, silver medalist(s)	Antje Gleichfeld	West Germany	2:08.2	
3rd place, bronze medalist(s)	Joy Catling	Great Britain	2:10.3	
4	Barbara Decker	West Germany	2:14.0	
5	Maria Góes Artigas	Brazil	?	
6	Sigrid Anna Grabert	Brazil	?	
