= Athletics at the 1961 Summer Universiade – Women's 800 metres =

The women's 800 metres event at the 1961 Summer Universiade was held at the Vasil Levski National Stadium in Sofia, Bulgaria, in September 1961.

== Medalists ==
Gold	Silver	Bronze
Antje Gleichfeld; West Germany	Florica Grecescu; Romania	Tsvetana Isaeva; Bulgaria

== Results ==
=== Heats ===
Rank	Heat	Name	Nationality	Time	Notes
1	1	Florica Grecescu	Romania	2:16.4	Q
2	1	Antje Gleichfeld	West Germany	2:16.8	Q
3	1	Joy Catling	Great Britain	2:16.9	Q
4	1	Lydia Ilkova	Bulgaria	2:17.0	
1	2	Tsvetana Isaeva	Bulgaria	2:13.9	Q
2	2	Edith Schiller	West Germany	2:14.7	Q
3	2	Roma Ashby	Great Britain	2:14.9	Q
4	2	Monika Kropacová	Czechoslovakia	2:15.4	
5	2	Pelagia Truszan	Poland	2:20.4	

=== Final ===
Rank	Athlete	Nationality	Time	Notes
1st place, gold medalist(s)	Antje Gleichfeld	West Germany	2:07.76	
2nd place, silver medalist(s)	Florica Grecescu	Romania	2:08.67	
3rd place, bronze medalist(s)	Tsvetana Isaeva	Bulgaria	2:12.59	
4	Edith Schiller	West Germany	2:14.2	
5	Joy Catling	Great Britain	2:14.4	
6	Roma Ashby	Great Britain	2:14.4	
