= Knipphals =

Knipphals is a German surname. Notable people with the surname include:

- Jens Knipphals (born 1958), West German long jumper
- Sven Knipphals (born 1985), German sprinter
