= Hein-Direck Neu =

German discus thrower (1944–2017)

Personal information
- Born: 13 January 1944 Bad Kreuznach, West Germany
- Died: 14 April 2017 (aged 73) Wiesbaden, Germany

Sport
- Sport: Track and field
Medal record
Representing West Germany
Summer Universiade
Silver medal – second place	1967 Tokyo	Discus throw
Silver medal – second place	1970 Turin	Discus throw

Hein-Direck Neu (13 February 1944 – 14 April 2017) was a German discus thrower.

In his early international career, Neu prominently won the silver medals at both the 1967 Summer Universiade and the 1970 Summer Universiade. He also finished tenth at the 1965 Summer Universiade, eleventh at the 1966 European Championships, ninth at the 1968 Summer Olympics, twelfth at the 1974 European Championships, and twelfth at the 1976 Summer Olympics. and third at the 1977 IAAF World Cup.

He also competed at the 1971 European Championships and the 1972 Summer Olympics without reaching the final.

At the West German Athletics Championships, Neu won medals in the discus throw between 1965 and 1977, with six gold medals coming in 1966, 1967, 1968, 1969, 1974 and 1976. The athletes who won gold ahead of Neu in the intermittent years were Jens Reimers, Dirk Wippermann and Klaus-Peter Hennig. Neu represented the club USC Mainz until 1969, then LG Bayer Leverkusen from 1970. Indoors, Neu managed to win a West German championship bronze in the shot put once, in 1968.

Neu tested positive for anabolic steroids alongside Joachim Krug in May 1978. The substance had only been banned from training the year ahead. While he fought the ban juridically, Neu started at the 1978 West German Championships. Neu testified that Manfred Steinbach was behind the prescription. Neu admitted to doping again in a 2013 interview with the Wiesbadener Kurier, and stated that doping was endemic in discus throwing.

His personal best throw was 68.08 metres, achieved in 1977. After his active career he worked as a teacher.
