= Riesner =

Riesner is a surname. Notable people with the surname include:

- Dean Riesner (1918–2002), American film and television writer
- Hubert Riesner (born 1946), German long-distance runner
- Otto Riesner (1910–?), Polish footballer
- Rainer Riesner (born 1950), German pastor and theologian
