= Athletics at the 1957 World University Games – Women's 800 metres =

The women's 800 metres event at the 1957 World University Games was held at the Stadium Charlety in Paris on 6 September 1957.

== Results ==
Rank	Name	Nationality	Time	Notes
1st place, gold medalist(s)	Yelizaveta Yermolayeva	Soviet Union	2:12.3	
2nd place, silver medalist(s)	Ariane Doser	West Germany	2:13.4	
3rd place, bronze medalist(s)	Milica Rajkov	Yugoslavia	2:13.6	
4	Florica Otel	Romania	2:14.0	
5	Edith Schiller	West Germany	2:14.7	
6	Nicole Gouilleux	France	2:15.5	
7	Roma Ashby	Great Britain	2:21.0	
8	Hopkins	Great Britain	2:30.2	
9	Noel	Belgium	2:39.3	
