= Hiroko Sato (athlete) =

Japanese javelin thrower (born 1939)

Personal information
- Nationality: Japanese
- Born: 10 June 1939 (age 86)
- Height: 160 cm (5 ft 3 in)
- Weight: 55 kg (121 lb)

Sport
- Sport: Athletics
- Event: Javelin throw

Hiroko Sato (佐藤 弘子, Satō Hiroko; born 10 June 1939) is a Japanese retired track and field athlete, who competed at the 1964 Summer Olympics.

== Biography ==
Sato finished second behind Anneliese Gerhards in the javelin throw event at the British 1963 WAAA Championships.

The following year at the 1964 Olympic Games in Tokyo, Sato competed in the women's javelin throw competition.
