= Marise Chamberlain =

New Zealand middle-distance runner (1935–2024)

Marise Chamberlain MNZM
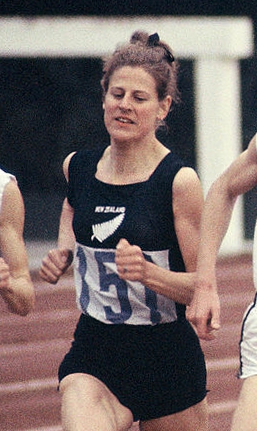
- Chamberlain at the 1964 Olympics

Personal information
- Born: 5 December 1935 Christchurch, New Zealand
- Died: 5 November 2024 (aged 88) Christchurch, New Zealand
- Height: 1.69 m (5 ft 7 in)
- Weight: 55 kg (121 lb)

Sport
- Sport: Athletics
- Event: 800 m
- Club: Canterbury

Achievements and titles
- Personal best: 800 m – 2:01.4 (1962)
Medal record
Representing New Zealand
Olympic Games
Bronze medal – third place	1964 Tokyo	800 metres
Commonwealth Games
Silver medal – second place	1962 Perth	880 yards

Marise Ann Millicent Chamberlain, MNZM (5 December 1935 – 5 November 2024) was a New Zealand middle-distance runner. At the time of her death in 2024, she was the only New Zealand woman to have won an Olympic medal in track athletics (Lorraine Moller won a medal in the marathon). She set world records over 440 yards, 400 metres and 1 mile.

At the 1962 British Empire and Commonwealth Games in Perth, Western Australia, she won a silver medal over 880 yards, behind Australian Dixie Willis. Two years later, at the Summer Olympics in Tokyo, she won the bronze medal behind Ann Packer (gold) and Maryvonne Dupureur (silver), the top five runners beating the old Olympic record time set by Dupureur in the semifinals.

At the 1966 British Empire and Commonwealth Games in Kingston, Jamaica Chamberlain stumbled just before the finish line when leading in the 880 yds final and missed out on a medal.

In the 2003 Queen's Birthday Honours, Chamberlain was appointed a Member of the New Zealand Order of Merit, for services to athletics.

Chamberlain was inducted into the New Zealand Sports Hall of Fame in 1995. She lived in the Christchurch suburb of South New Brighton all her life and also lived in Heathcote Valley for a number of years. After Earle Wells's death in 2021, she was the only surviving New Zealand medallist from the 1964 Summer Olympics.

Chamberlain died in Christchurch on 5 November 2024, at the age of 88.

== Honors ==
Chamberlain Place, in the Hamilton suburb of Chartwell, is named in Chamberlain's honour.

Records
Preceded by Diane Leather	Women's mile world record holder 8 December 1962 – 13 May 1967	Succeeded by Anne Smith
