= 1958 European Athletics Championships – Women's 800 metres =

Women's 800 metres at the European Athletics Championships
- Venue: Olympic Stadium
- Location: Stockholm, Sweden
- Dates: 22 August 1958 (heats); 24 August 1958 (final)
- Competitors: 19 from 11 nations
- Winning time: 2:06.3 min CR

Medalists
gold medal	Yelizaveta Yermolayeva	Soviet Union
silver medal	Diane Leather	Great Britain
bronze medal	Dzidra Levicka	Soviet Union

The women's 800 metres at the 1958 European Athletics Championships was held at Stockholms Olympiastadion in Stockholm, Sweden, on 22 and 24 August 1958.

== Results ==
=== Heats ===
The three preliminary heats were held on 22 August.

Results of heat 1
Rank	Name	Nation	Time	Notes
1	Yelizaveta Yermolayeva	Soviet Union	2:10.1	Q
2	Joy Jordan	Great Britain	2:10.5	Q
3	Ariane Döser	West Germany	2:10.7	Q
4	Krystyna Nowakowska	Poland	2:10.7	
5	Eila Helin	Finland	2:11.9	
6	Jytte Kort	Denmark	2:16.4	
7	Maria Kessels	Belgium	2:38.5	

Results of heat 2
Rank	Name	Nation	Time	Notes
1	Diane Leather	Great Britain	2:09.8	Q
2	Dzidra Levicka	Soviet Union	2:10.0	Q
3	Beata Żbikowska	Poland	2:10.2	Q
4	Margrete Buscher	West Germany	2:11.3	
5	Nicole Goullieux	France	2:11.7	
6	Milica Rajkov	Yugoslavia	2:13.3	

Results of heat 3
Rank	Name	Nation	Time	Notes
1	Betty Loakes	Great Britain	2:10.6	Q
2	Vera Mukhanova	Soviet Union	2:10.6	Q
3	Edith Schiller	West Germany	2:10.8	Q
4	Gül Çıray	Turkey	2:11.6	NR
5	Aranka Kazi	Hungary	2:12.1	
6	Saara Vilén	Finland	2:15.1	

=== Final ===
The final was held on 24 August.

Results of the final
Rank	Name	Nation	Time	Notes
1st place, gold medalist(s)	Yelizaveta Yermolayeva	Soviet Union	2:06.3	CR
2nd place, silver medalist(s)	Diane Leather	Great Britain	2:06.6	
3rd place, bronze medalist(s)	Dzidra Levicka	Soviet Union	2:06.6	
4	Ariane Döser	West Germany	2:08.2	
5	Vera Mukhanova	Soviet Union	2:08.4	
6	Edith Schiller	West Germany	2:10.2	
7	Beata Żbikowska	Poland	2:11.0	
8	Betty Loakes	Great Britain	2:11.4	
9	Joy Jordan	Great Britain	2:11.6	
