= Skobtsova =

Skobtsova (Russian: Скобцова) is a female form of Russian surname Skobtsov. Notable people with the surname include:

- Maria Skobtsova (1891–1945), Russian noblewoman, poet, and nun
- Zoya Skobtsova (born 1934), Soviet middle-distance runner
