= 1967 European Indoor Games – Women's 800 metres =

The women's 800 metres event at the 1967 European Indoor Games was held on 12 March in Prague.

== Results ==
Rank	Name	Nationality	Time	Notes
1st place, gold medalist(s)	Karin Kessler	West Germany	2:08.2	
2nd place, silver medalist(s)	Maryvonne Dupureur	France	2:09.6	
3rd place, bronze medalist(s)	Valentina Lukyanova	Soviet Union	2:10.5	
4	Emilie Ovadková	Czechoslovakia	2:10.8	
5	Rosemary Stirling	Great Britain	2:11.6	
6	Dobroslava Žáková	Czechoslovakia	2:12.4	
7	Mirjana Kovačev	Yugoslavia	2:15.4	
