= 1958 European Athletics Championships – Women's 400 metres =

Women's 400 metres at the European Athletics Championships
- Venue: Olympiastadion
- Location: Stockholm, Sweden
- Dates: 19 August 1958 (round 1); 21 August 1958 (final)
- Competitors: 12 from 8 nations
- Winning time: 53.7 s CR

Medalists
gold medal	Mariya Itkina	Soviet Union
silver medal	Yekaterina Parlyuk	Soviet Union
bronze medal	Moyra Hiscox	Great Britain

The women's 400 metres at the 1958 European Athletics Championships was held over two rounds at the Olympic Stadium in Stockholm, Sweden, on 19 and 21 August 1958. It was the first time that this women's event was contested at the European Athletics Championships, while the men's 400 metres had been part of the program since the first championships in 1934.

Twelve athletes from eight nations competed in the first round on 19 August, from where six athletes advanced to the final on 21 August. World-record holder Mariya Itkina of the Soviet Union set a championship record of 54.0 seconds in round 1, which she improved in the final, where she won the gold medal in a time of 53.7 s. Yekaterina Parlyuk of the Soviet Union finished second in 54.8 s and Moyra Hiscox of Great Britain was third in 55.7 s.

== Background ==
At the International Amateur Athletic Federation congress of 1956, the women's 400 metres was newly added to the program of the European Athletics Championships for the 1958 edition, at the request of the Soviet delegation. The men's 400 metres had already been contested five times at the European Athletics Championships before 1958, since the first edition in 1934.

At the start of the 1958 championships, the world and European record was 53.6 s, set a year earlier by Mariya Itkina of the Soviet Union. Itkina was seen as the favourite to win based on her performances from 1958. Being contested for the first time at the European Athletics Championships, there was no championship record for this event yet.

The event was held at the Olympic Stadium in Stockholm, Sweden. The stadium from 1912 had been renovated before these championships; the stands were moved back in order to change the track from 382 metres to the international standard of 400 metres. All races were hand-timed (h).

Record before the 1958 European Athletics Championships
Record	Time	Athlete (nation)	Location	Date
World record	53.6 h	Mariya Itkina (URS)	Moscow, Soviet Union	6 July 1957
European record	53.6 h	Mariya Itkina (URS)	Moscow, Soviet Union	6 July 1957
Championship record	Vacant			

== Results ==
=== Round 1 ===
Twelve athletes from eight nations competed in two heats of round 1 on 19 August. The three fastest athletes of each heat qualified for the final (Q). In the first heat, the fastest time of 54.0 s by Mariya Itkina of the Soviet Union was the first championship record (CR) for the event.

Results of round 1
Rank	Heat	Athlete	Nation	Time	Notes
1	1	Mariya Itkina	Soviet Union	54.0 h	CR, Q
2	2	Yekaterina Parlyuk	Soviet Union	55.4 h	Q
3	2	Vera Mukhanova	Soviet Union	55.7 h	Q
4	2	Moyra Hiscox	Great Britain	55.7 h	Q
5	2	Maria Jeibmann	West Germany	55.9 h	
6	1	Shirley Pirie	Great Britain	56.2 h	Q
7	1	Ida Németh	Hungary	56.8 h	Q
8	2	Beata Żbikowska	Poland	57.2 h	
9	1	Bärbel Reinnagel	East Germany	57.7 h	
10	2	Jytte Kort	Denmark	57.9 h	
11	1	Lesley MacKinnon	Great Britain	58.2 h	
12	1	Gül Çiray	Turkey	60.8 h	

=== Final ===
Six athletes from three nations competed in the final on 21 August. The race was won by Mariya Itkina of the Soviet Union who improved her championship record (CR) from two days earlier to 53.7 s, followed by Yekaterina Parlyuk of the Soviet Union in second place in 54.8 s and Moyra Hiscox of Great Britain in third place in 55.7 s. Being exhausted after the race, Hiscox was treated by a physician and missed the medal ceremony.

Itkina's performance was 0.1 s slower than her world record from a year earlier. Itkina's obituary by World Athletics recalled that she "dominated the event" being over a second faster than the number two. The Dutch newspaper Het Binnenhof reported that "the superiority of the Russians was astonishing", referring to Itkina, Vasili Kuznetsov, and Galina Bystrova of the Soviet Union, as all three won gold medals that day.

Results of the final
Rank	Athlete	Nation	Time	Notes
1st place, gold medalist(s)	Mariya Itkina	Soviet Union	53.7 h	CR
2nd place, silver medalist(s)	Yekaterina Parlyuk	Soviet Union	54.8 h	
3rd place, bronze medalist(s)	Moyra Hiscox	Great Britain	55.7 h	
4	Shirley Pirie	Great Britain	55.7 h	
5	Vera Mukhanova	Soviet Union	56.3 h	
6	Ida Németh	Hungary	56.3 h	
