= 1967 European Indoor Games – Women's medley relay =

The women's 150 + 300 + 450 + 600 medley relay event at the 1967 European Indoor Games was held on 12 March in Prague. The first athlete ran one lap of the 150-metre track, the second two, the third three and the anchor four, thus 10 laps or 1500 metres in total.

== Results ==
Rank	Nation	Competitors	Time	Notes
1st place, gold medalist(s)	Soviet Union	Valentyna Bolshova; Vera Popkova; Tatyana Arnautova; Nadeshda Syeropegina	3:35.6	
2nd place, silver medalist(s)	Yugoslavia	Marijana Lubej; Ika Maričić; Ljiljana Petnjarić; Gizela Farkaš	3:37.5	
	Czechoslovakia	Eva Lehocká; Anna Majtanová; Anna Chmelková; Vera Busová	DSQ	
