= Athletics at the 1962 British Empire and Commonwealth Games – Women's 880 yards =

Women's 880 yards at the 1962 British Empire and Commonwealth Games
- Venue: Perry Lakes Stadium
- Date: 1 December 1962
- Competitors: 8 from 5 nations
- Winning time: 2:03.7 GR

Medalists
gold medal	Dixie Willis	Australia
silver medal	Marise Chamberlain	New Zealand
bronze medal	Joy Jordan	England

The women's 880 yards at the 1962 British Empire and Commonwealth Games as part of the athletics programme was held at the Perry Lakes Stadium on Saturday 1 December 1962.

After a 16-year absence, the event made its return to the women's program and was won by the world record holder, Australian Dixie Willis. Willis finished two seconds ahead of Marise Chamberlain from New Zealand and her fellow countrywoman Joy Jordan. The winning time of 2:03.7 easily accounted for the Games record set by Englishwoman Gladys Lunn in 1934, with all but last place finisher posting times inside the mark.

== Records ==
World record	Dixie Willis (AUS)	2:02.0	Perth, Western Australia	3 March 1962
Commonwealth record				
Games record	Gladys Lunn (ENG)	2:19.4	London, United Kingdom	6 August 1934

The following records were established during the competition:

Date	Event	Name	Nationality	Time	Record
1 December	Final	Dixie Willis	Australia	2:03.7	GR

== Final ==
Rank	Name	Nationality	Time	Notes
1st place, gold medalist(s)	Dixie Willis	Australia	2:03.7	GR
2nd place, silver medalist(s)	Marise Chamberlain	New Zealand	2:05.7	
3rd place, bronze medalist(s)	Joy Jordan	England	2:05.9	
4	Phyllis Perkins	England	2:09.4	
5	Joan Beretta	Australia	2:12.2	
6	Jackie Barnett	Wales	2:14.8	
7	Abby Hoffman	Canada	2:21.6	
	Joy Grieveson	England		DNS
