= Mary Hodson =

British middle-distance runner

Personal information
- Nationality: British
- Born: 28 October 1946 (age 79)

Sport
- Sport: Middle-distance running
- Event: 800 metres

Mary Hodson (born 28 October 1946) is a British middle-distance runner. She competed in the women's 800 metres at the 1964 Summer Olympics.
