= Pam Piercy =

Former British athlete (born 1937)

Personal information
- Nationality: British (English)
- Born: 4 July 1937 (age 88)

Sport
- Sport: Athletics
- Event: 400m/440y
- Club: Ideal Standard AC Hull; Hull Achilles

Pamela Joyce Piercy (born 4 July 1937), is a female former athlete who competed for England.

== Biography ==
Piercy finished third behind Shirley Pirie in the 440 yards event at the 1958 WAAA Championships and then two years later became the national 440 yards champion after winning the British WAAA Championships title at the 1960 WAAA Championships Piercy would not podium again at the WAAA Championships until winning silver in the 880 yards behind Anne Smith at the 1965 WAAA Championships.

Piercy was selected by England to represent her country at the 1966 European Championships. She finished just outside of the medals in fourth place, in the 1966 European Athletics Championships – Women's 800 metres in Budapest, Hungary.

She represented the England team in the 440 and 880 yards, at the 1966 British Empire and Commonwealth Games in Kingston, Jamaica.

She was a coach for Hull Achilles Athletics Club.
