= Yekaterina Parlyuk =

Soviet middle-distance runner

Personal information
- Nationality: Soviet
- Born: 10 January 1935
- Died: 22 September 2004 (aged 69)

Sport
- Sport: Middle-distance running
- Event: 800 metres
Medal record
Women's athletics
Representing the Soviet Union
European Championships
Silver medal – second place	1958 Stockholm	400 m

Yekaterina Parlyuk (10 January 1935 – 22 September 2004) was a Soviet middle-distance runner. She competed in the women's 800 metres at the 1960 Summer Olympics.
