= Beata Żbikowska =

Polish middle-distance runner

Personal information
- Full name: Beata Margaryta Żbikowska
- Nationality: Polish
- Born: 16 April 1934 (age 92) Rosenberg, Germany (modern-day Poland)
- Height: 1.58 m (5 ft 2 in)
- Weight: 49 kg (108 lb)

Sport
- Sport: Middle-distance running
- Event: 800 metres
- Club: Kolejarz Szczecin (1951); Kolejarz Olsztyn (1952-1953); AZS Gdańsk (1954); CWKS Zawisza Bydgoszcz (1956-1957); Budowlani Bydgoszcz (1958-1962)

Beata Margaryta Żbikowska (née Szulc; born 16 April 1934) is a Polish middle-distance runner. She competed in the women's 800 metres at the 1960 Summer Olympics.

== International competitions ==
Year	Competition	Venue	Position	Event	Notes
Representing Poland
1958	European Championships	Belgrade, Yugoslavia	8th (h)	400 m	57.2
1958	European Championships	Belgrade, Yugoslavia	7th	800 m	2:11.0
1960	Olympic Games	Rome, Italy	8th	800 m	2:11.91

== Personal bests ==
- 100 metres – 12.6h (Gdańsk 1954)
- 200 metres – 25.5h (Bydgoszcz 1956)
- 400 metres – 57.0h (Warsaw 1959)
- 800 metres – 2:08.7h (Tula 1960)
