= Masako Kisaki =

Japanese middle-distance runner

Personal information
- Nationality: Japanese
- Born: 7 November 1943 (age 82)

Sport
- Sport: Middle-distance running
- Event: 800 metres

Masako Kisaki (木崎 正子, Kisaki Masako; born 7 November 1943) is a Japanese middle-distance runner. She competed in the women's 800 metres at the 1964 Summer Olympics.
