= Zinaida Matistovich =

Soviet middle-distance runner

Personal information
- Nationality: Soviet
- Born: 9 May 1932 (age 94)

Sport
- Sport: Middle-distance running
- Event: 800 metres

Zinaida Matistovich (born 9 May 1932) is a Soviet middle-distance runner. She competed in the women's 800 metres at the 1960 Summer Olympics.
