= Sandy Knott =

American middle-distance runner

Personal information
- Nationality: American
- Born: 9 October 1937 Worcester, Massachusetts, U.S.
- Died: 26 June 2013 (aged 75) Springfield, Oregon, U.S.

Sport
- Sport: Middle-distance running
- Event: 800 metres

Sandra Phyllis "Sandy" Knott (October 9, 1937 – June 26, 2013) was an American middle-distance runner. She competed in the women's 800 metres at the 1964 Summer Olympics.
