= Jens Reimers =

German discus thrower (1941–2001)

Personal information
- Nationality: German
- Born: 15 August 1941 Salzwedel, Germany
- Died: 19 November 2001 (aged 60) Düsseldorf, Germany
- Height: 2.03 m (6 ft 8 in)

Sport
- Event: Discus throw
- Club: Rot-Weiß Oberhausen

Jens Reimers (15 August 1941 – 19 November 2001) was a German discus thrower.

He competed at the 1966 European Championships and the 1968 Summer Olympics without reaching the final.

At the West German Athletics Championships, Reimers won medals in the discus throw between 1961 and 1968, with four gold medals coming in 1961, 1962, 1963 and 1965. Initially he mainly competed against Josef Klik (who won in 1964) and Dietrich Urbach, and from 1966 Hein-Direck Neu. Reimers then won silver medals in 1966 and 1968 and bronze medals in 1964 and 1967. He represented the club Rot-Weiß Oberhausen.

His personal best throw was 61.38 metres, achieved in 1967.
