= Moyra Hiscox =

Former British athlete

Molly Hiscox
Personal information
- Nationality: British (English)
- Born: 21 April 1937 (age 89) Brentford, London, England

Sport
- Sport: Track and field
- Event: Athletics
- Club: Spartan Ladies
Medal record
Women's athletics
Representing Great Britain
European Championships
Bronze medal – third place	1958 Stockholm	400 m

Moyra Eileen Hiscox also known as Molly Hiscox (born 27 April 1937) is a British former middle-distance runner who was a member of the Spartan Ladies club.

== Biography ==
Hiscox finished second behind Heather Young in the 220 yards event at the 1957 WAAA Championships.

Hiscox broke the world record in 440 yards in an invitation race at the White City Stadium, London, on 2 August 1958.

Hiscox competed for England in the 1958 Commonwealth Games finishing fourth in the 220 yards semi final.
