= 1963 WAAA Championships =

British athletics event

- Dates: 6 July
- Host city: London
- Venue: White City Stadium
- Level: Senior
- Type: Outdoor

The 1963 WAAA Championships were the national track and field championships for women in the United Kingdom.

The event was held at White City Stadium, London, on 6 July 1963. The 100 metres hurdles over a height of 2'6" was introduced.

== Results ==
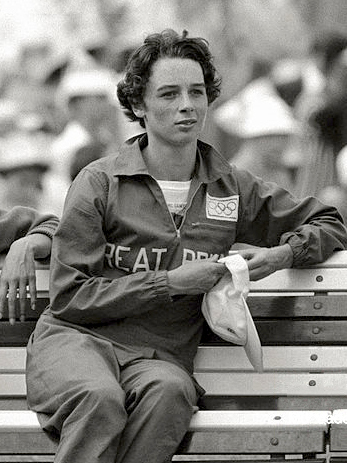
Dorothy Hyman remarkably won the sprint double for the fourth time and collected her 8th WAAA title

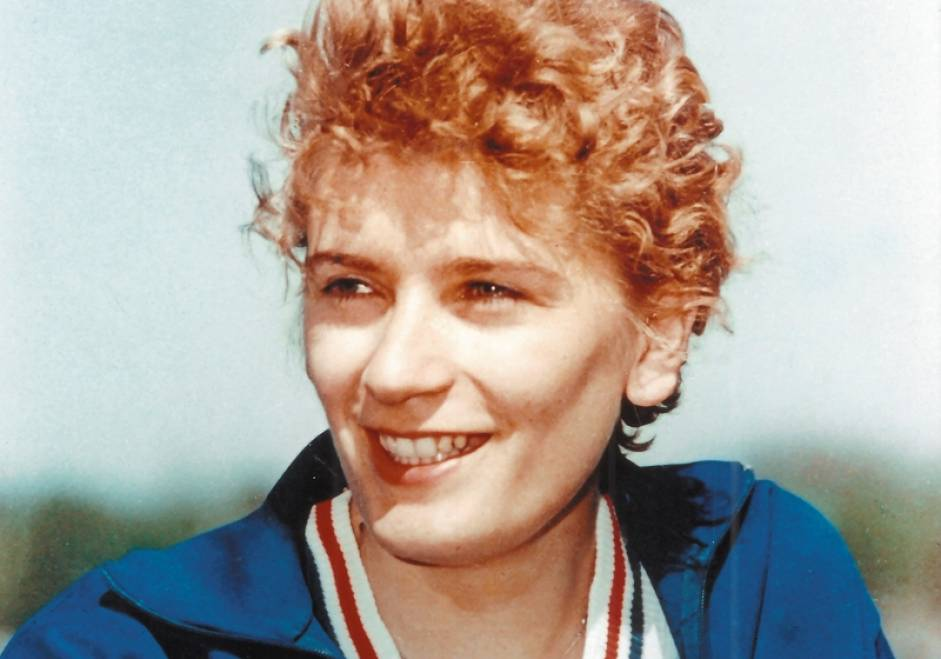
Iolanda Balaș from Romania won her 2nd WAAA title

Event	Gold		Silver		Bronze	
100 yards	Dorothy Hyman	10.9	Daphne Arden	11.1	Madeleine Cobb	11.2
220 yards	Dorothy Hyman	24.3	(Italy) Donata Govoni	24.4	Mary Rand	24.7
440 yards	Joy Grieveson	55.9	(Republic of Ireland) Maeve Kyle	56.5	Mary Tagg	57.3
880 yards	Phyllis Perkins	2:12.2	Joy Catling	2:13.2	Anne Smith	2:13.2
1 mile	Pamela Davies	5:10.8	Madeleine Ibbotson	5:14.0	(Scotland) Helen Cherry	5:17.5
80 metres hurdles	Pat Nutting	11.2	(Japan) Ikuko Yoda	11.2	(Italy) Letizia Bertoni	11.5
100 metres hurdles	Pat Nutting	14.1	Susan Mills	14.8	Maxine Botley	15.0
200 metres hurdles	Pat Nutting	28.9	Susan Mills	30.2	Susan Webb	30.4
High jump	(Romania) Iolanda Balaș	1.702	Linda Knowles & Susan Dennler			1.600
Long jump	Mary Rand	5.91	Sheila Parkin	5.85	(West Germany) Christa Biggemann	5.84
Shot put	(West Germany) Marlene Klein	15.48	Suzanne Allday	14.81	(South Africa) Wilna Fraser	14.64
Discus throw	(Romania) Lia Manoliu	49.40	Suzanne Allday	44.39	Brenda Bedford	40.18
Javelin	(West Germany) Anneliese Gerhards	50.31	(Japan) Hiroko Sato	47.78	Rosemary Morgan	46.19
Pentathlon +	(Northern Ireland) Mary Peters	4385	Brenda Gill	4009	Pat Nutting	3992
1½ mile walk	Judy Farr	12:26.4	Sheila Jennings	12:46.2	Joyce Heath	13:01.0

+ Held on 11 May at Leamington Spa

== See also ==
- 1963 AAA Championships
