= Waltraud Pöhlitz =

Medal record

Women's athletics

Representing East Germany

European Championships
Silver medal – second place	1962 Belgrade	800 m

Waltraud Pöhlitz, née Waltraud Kaufmann, (10 March 1942, in Brockau) is a German middle-distance runner who specialised in the 800 metres.

She won the silver medal at the 1962 European Championships, finished eighth at the 1966 European Championships and competed at the 800 metres at the 1964 Summer Olympics without reaching the final.

In domestic competitions, she represented the sports club SC Chemie Halle. She became East German champion in 1962, 1963, 1964 and 1966. and East German indoor champion in 1964, 1965 and 1967. In 1967 she also became 1500 metres champion.
