= Jürgen Kalfelder =

German sprinter (born 1940)

Personal information
- Nationality: German
- Born: 27 September 1940 (age 85)

Sport
- Sport: Sprinting
- Event: 400 metres

Jürgen Kalfelder (born 27 September 1940) is a German sprinter. He competed in the men's 400 metres at the 1964 Summer Olympics.
