= Marlene Schmitz-Portz =

German high jumper

Personal information
- Nationality: German
- Born: 14 January 1938 (age 88) Euskirchen, Nazi Germany

Sport
- Sport: Athletics
- Event: High jump

Marlene Magdalena Schmitz-Portz (born 14 January 1938) is a German athlete. She competed in the women's high jump at the 1960 Summer Olympics.
