= Yelizaveta Yermolayeva =

Soviet middle-distance runner

Medal record

Women's athletics

Representing Soviet Union

European Championships
Gold medal – first place	1958 Stockholm	800 m

World University Games
Gold medal – first place	1957 Paris	800 m

Yelizaveta Aleksandrovna Yermolayeva (Russian: Елизавета Александровна Ермолаева; born 2 April 1930) is a former Soviet middle-distance runner.

Yermolayeva won the 800 metres at the 1957 World University Games in Paris, her first international success. She also won at the 1958 European Championships in Stockholm, beating Great Britain's Diane Leather in the championship record time of 2:06.3; Czechoslovak sports statistician Jan Popper ranked her the world's best at the distance that year. Yermolayeva was one of the favorites for the 1960 Summer Olympics in Rome, but was unable to compete due to injuries.
