= Sven Knipphals =

German sprinter

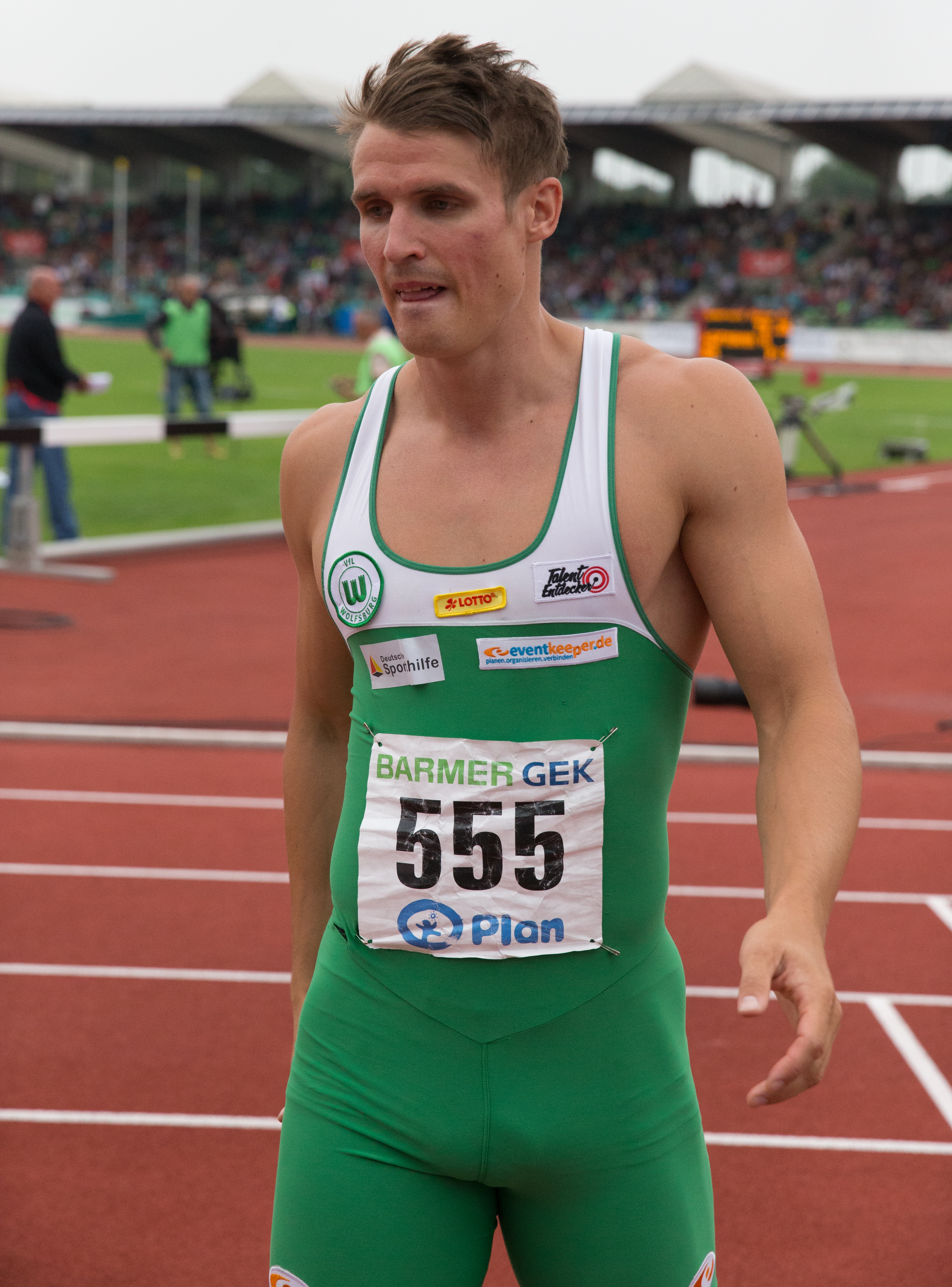
- Sven Knipphals in 2014

Personal information
- Born: 20 September 1985 (age 40) Hannover, West Germany
- Height: 1.90 m (6 ft 3 in)
- Weight: 88 kg (194 lb)

Sport
- Country: Germany
- Sport: Athletics
- Event: Sprint
- Club: VFL Wolfsburg
Medal record
European Championships
| Silver medal – second place | 2014 Zürich | 4 × 100 m relay |
| Bronze medal – third place | 2016 Amsterdam | 4 × 100 m relay |
IAAF World Relays
| Bronze medal – third place | 2015 Nassau | 4 × 200 m relay |

Sven Knipphals (born 20 September 1985 in Hannover) is a German athlete specialising in the sprinting events. He finished fourth in the 4 × 100 metres relay at the 2013 World Championships. In addition, he won the silver medal in the same event at the 2014 European Championships.

His father, Jens Knipphals, is a former long jumper.

== Competition record ==
| Year | Competition | Venue | Position | Event | Notes |
Representing Germany
| 2012 | European Championships | Helsinki, Finland | 12th (sf) | 200 m | 20.92 |
| 2013 | World Championships | Moscow, Russia | 4th | 4 × 100 m relay | 38.04 |
| 2014 | European Championships | Zürich, Switzerland | 12th (sf) | 100 m | 10.37 |
| 2014 | European Championships | Zürich, Switzerland | 2nd | 4 × 100 m relay | 38.09 |
| 2015 | IAAF World Relays | Nassau, Bahamas | 3rd | 4 × 200 m relay | 1:22.65 |
| 2015 | World Championships | Beijing, China | 37th (h) | 100 m | 10.31 |
| 2015 | World Championships | Beijing, China | 4th | 4 × 100 m relay | 38.15 |
| 2016 | European Championships | Amsterdam, Netherlands | 3rd | 4 × 100 m relay | 38.47 |
| 2016 | Olympic Games | Rio de Janeiro, Brazil | 9th (h) | 4 × 100 m relay | 38.26 |
| 2017 | IAAF World Relays | Nassau, Bahamas | 8th (h) | 4 × 100 m relay | 39.11 |

== Personal bests ==
Outdoor

- 100 metres – 10.13 (+1.9 m/s) (Regensburg 2015)
- 200 metres – 20.48 (+1.7 m/s) (Mannheim 2014)

Indoor

- 200 metres – 21.02 (Karlsruhe 2012)
