= Brenda Jones (athlete) =

Australian middle-distance runner

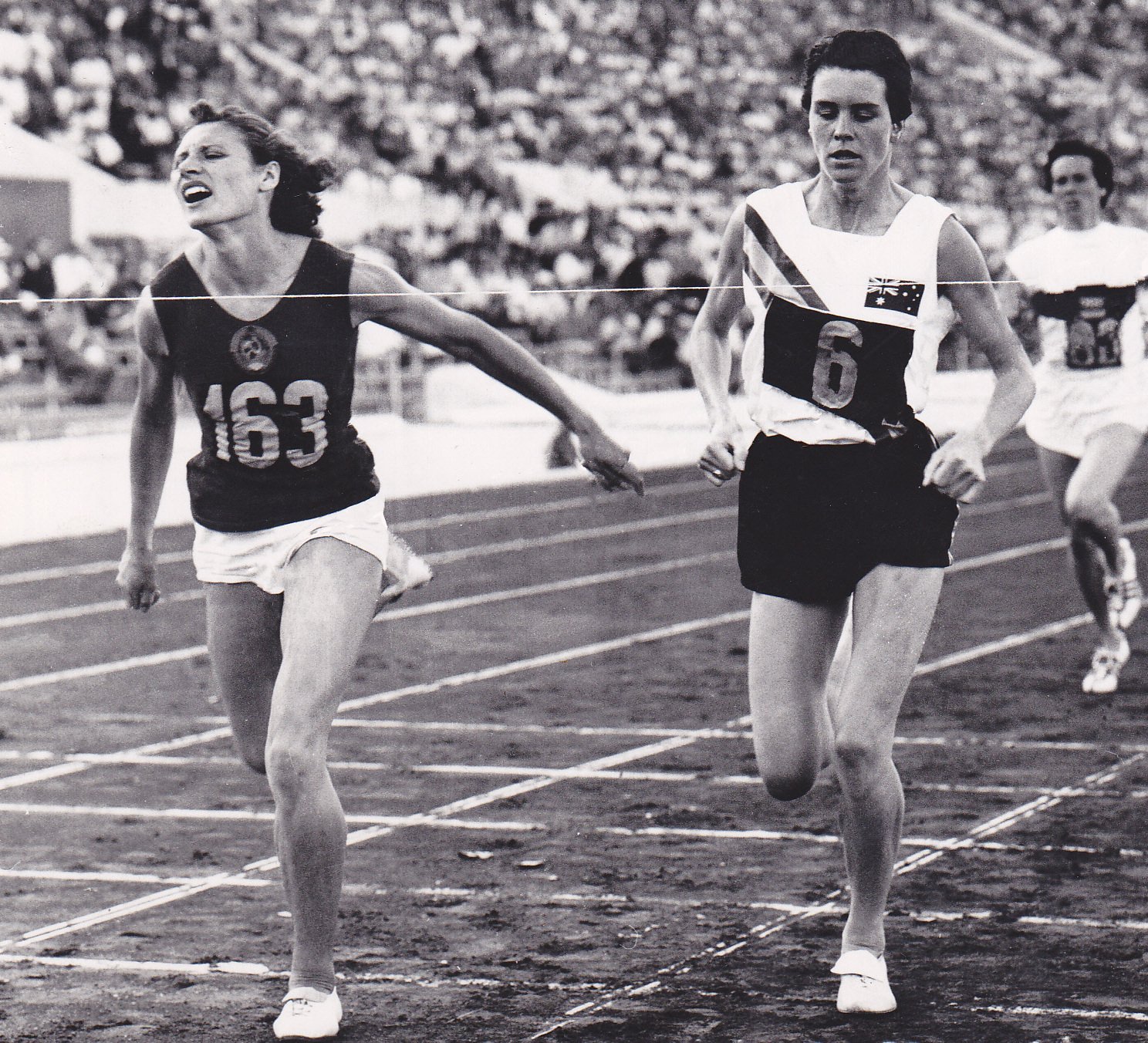
- Lyudmila Shevtsova vs. Brenda Jones at the 1960 Olympics

Personal information
- Born: 17 November 1936 (age 89) Leongatha, Victoria, Australia
- Height: 1.73 m (5 ft 8 in)
- Weight: 55 kg (121 lb)

Sport
- Sport: Middle-distance running
- Club: Glenhuntly Athletics Club
Medal record
Representing Australia
Olympic Games
| Silver medal – second place | 1960 Rome | 800 metres |

Brenda Jones (later Carr, born 17 November 1936) is a retired Australian middle-distance runner. At the 1958 national championships she won the 440 yards and 880 yards races. In 1960 she was fifth in 440 yards and second in 880 yards. At the 1960 Olympics, she led the 800 m race, but in the last few metres lost to Lyudmila Shevtsova, who equalled her world record.
