= Zoya Skobtsova =

Soviet middle-distance runner

Personal information
- Nationality: Soviet
- Born: 3 July 1934 (age 92)

Sport
- Sport: Middle-distance running
- Event: 800 metres

Zoya Skobtsova (born 3 July 1934) is a Soviet middle-distance runner. She competed in the women's 800 metres at the 1964 Summer Olympics.
