= Vera Kummerfeldt =

German middle-distance runner

Personal information
- Nationality: German
- Born: 11 April 1935 (age 91) Breslau, Germany

Sport
- Sport: Middle-distance running
- Event: 800 metres

Vera Kummerfeldt (born 11 April 1935) is a German middle-distance runner. She competed in the women's 800 metres at the 1960 Summer Olympics.
