= Karl-Heinz Sievers =

German long-distance runner (born 1942)

Personal information
- Nationality: German
- Born: 2 October 1942 (age 83) Westerstede, Germany

Sport
- Sport: Long-distance running
- Event: Marathon

Karl-Heinz Sievers (born 2 October 1942) is a German former long-distance runner. He competed in the marathon at the 1968 Summer Olympics representing West Germany.
