= Gizella Sasvári-Csóka =

Hungarian middle-distance runner

Personal information
- Nationality: Hungarian
- Born: 13 November 1932 (age 93)

Sport
- Sport: Middle-distance running
- Event: 800 metres

Gizella Sasvári-Csóka (born 13 November 1932) is a Hungarian middle-distance runner. She competed in the women's 800 metres at the 1960 Summer Olympics.
