= Joachim Krug =

German football manager

Personal information
- Date of birth: 20 August 1955 (age 71)

Managerial career
- Years: Team
- 1984–1987: Arminia Bielefeld (assistant)
- 1987–1988: Arminia Bielefeld
- 1988–1989: VfB Oldenburg
- 1989–1991: 1. SC Göttingen 05
- 1992–1996: TuS Ahlen
- 1996–1998: LR Ahlen (director of sports)
- 1998–2000: 1. SC Göttingen 05
- 2000–2003: LR Ahlen (director of sports)
- 2004–2009: Hammer SpVg (director of sports)
- 2009–2010: RB Leipzig (director of sports)
- 2011–2012: Rot Weiss Ahlen
- 2012–?: Rot Weiss Ahlen (director of sports)

Joachim Krug (born 20 August 1955) is a German football manager.
