= Julius Müller (race walker) =

German racewalker (1938–2017)

Personal information
- Nationality: German
- Born: 16 December 1938 Delmenhorst, Germany
- Died: 19 September 2017 (aged 78) Delmenhorst, Germany

Sport
- Sport: Athletics
- Event: Racewalking

Julius Müller (16 December 1938 – 19 September 2017) was a German racewalker. He competed in the men's 20 kilometres walk at the 1968 Summer Olympics.
