= Joy Jordan =

British athlete (born 1935)

Joy Jordan née Buckmaster
Personal information
- Nationality: British (English)
- Born: 13 November 1935 (age 90) Farnborough, Hampshire, England
- Height: 165 cm (5 ft 5 in)
- Weight: 57 kg (126 lb)

Sport
- Sport: Athletics
- Event: 400, 800 metres
- Club: Guildford & Godalming AC
Medal record
Athletics
Representing England
British Empire & Commonwealth Games
Bronze medal – third place	1962 Perth	880 yards

Joy Wilhelmina Jordan née Buckmaster (born 13 November 1935) is a former British (middle distance) athlete in the early 1960s, who held the world record for 880 yards in 1960 and competed at the 1960 Summer Olympics.

== Biography ==
Born in Farnborough, Hampshire, Buckmaster finished third behind Janet Ruff in the 440 yards event at the 1956 WAAA Championships. She married Dennis Jordan (who would be her coach at the 1960 Olympic Games), in 1957 in north-west Surrey and competed under her married name thereafter.

Jordan became the national 880 yards champion after winning the British WAAA Championships title at the 1958 WAAA Championships defeating her great rival Diane Leather. The same year she competed in the 800 metres event at the 1958 European Athletics Championships in Stockholm, where she came ninth in the final.

On 14 June 1958 in London, she competed in the 4 × 400 metres relay in a British team which broke the world record with a time of 3:49.9. This record would hold until 5 August 1967, when a Swedish team took it to 3:49.4 at the Ryavallen, Borås in Sweden. The event was only recognised by the IAAF in 1969.

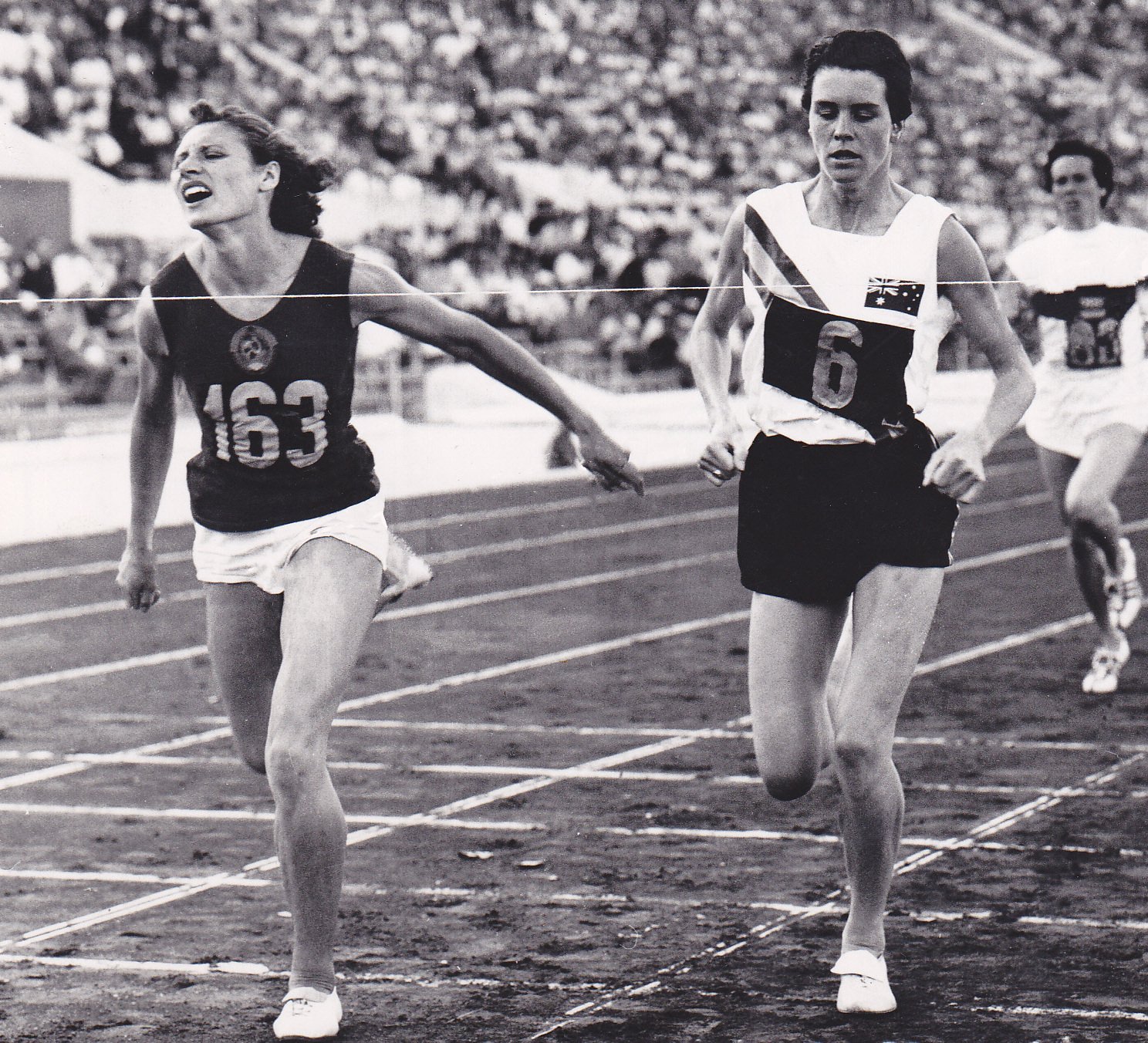
The gold and silver medal winners in the 1960 Rome 800 metres final

In 1959, she was ranked third in the world at 800m and successfully retained her WAAA title at the 1959 WAAA Championships and the 1960 WAAA Championships.

At the 1960 Olympic Games in Rome, she represented Great Britain aged 24, in the 800 metres competition, where she came sixth in the final with a time of 2:07.8. The world record was broken in the final by Lyudmila Shevtsova of the Soviet Union.

A few weeks after the Olympics, in Welwyn Garden City in Hertfordshire on 24 September 1960, she ran 2:06.1 for the 880 yards, taking the world record from Nina Otkalenko (2:06.6) of the Soviet Union. Nina Otkalenko held the 800m world record for most of the 1950s.

After winning a fourth and fifth consecutive WAAA title at the 1961 WAAA Championships and 1962 WAAA Championships respectively, she competed in the 800 metres event at the 1962 European Athletics Championships in Belgrade, coming fourth in the final with a British record of 2:05.0, and her career best at the 800m, where Gerda Kraan of the Netherlands won. Also in 1962, Jordan competed in the 880 yards at the 1962 British Empire and Commonwealth Games in Australia, where she gained a bronze for England with 2:05.9.

Jordan finished second behind Rita Lincoln in the 1 mile event at the 1967 WAAA Championships.

== Personal life ==
She lives in Radcliffe-on-Trent in Nottinghamshire. She had a daughter in 1964, and a son in 1966.

== See also ==
- Women's 4 × 400 metres relay world record progression
- 800 metres world record progression

Records
Preceded by Nina Otkalenko	Women's 880 yards world record holder 24 September 1960 – March 1962	Succeeded by
Records
Preceded by	Women's 4 × 400 metres relay record holder 14 June 1958 – 5 August 1967	Succeeded by
