= Manfred Letzerich =

German long-distance runner (1942–2026)

Personal information
- Nationality: German
- Born: 15 August 1942 Wiesbaden, Gau Hesse-Nassau, Germany
- Died: 28 September 2026 (aged 84)

Sport
- Sport: Long-distance running
- Event: 5000 metres

Manfred Letzerich (15 August 1942 – 28 September 2026) was a German long-distance runner. He competed in the men's 5000 metres at the 1964 Summer Olympics. Letzerich died on 28 September 2026, at the age of 84.
