= Marlene Fuchs =

German shot putter (1942–2026)

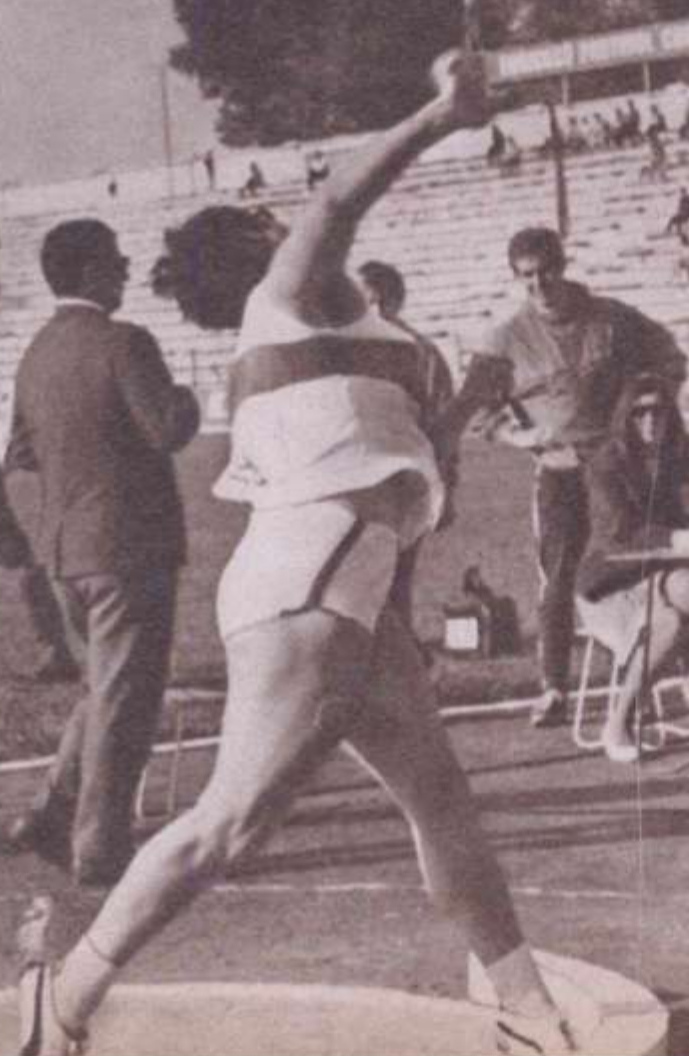

Personal information
- Nationality: German
- Born: 31 March 1942 Euskirchen, Gau Cologne-Aachen, Germany
- Died: 5 October 2026 (aged 84) Euskirchen, North Rhine-Westphalia, Germany
- Height: 174 cm (5 ft 9 in)
- Weight: 80 kg (176 lb)

Sport
- Sport: Athletics
- Event: Shot put
- Club: ETSC 1848/1913, Euskirchen

Marlene Fuchs (née Klein; 31 March 1942 – 5 October 2026) was a German athlete who competed at the 1968 Summer Olympics.

== Biography ==
Klein won the British WAAA Championships title in the shot put event at the 1963 WAAA Championships.

At the 1968 Olympic Games in Mexico City, she competed in the women's shot put competition.

Fuchs died in Euskirchen on 5 October 2026, at the age of 84.
