= Bernhard Nermerich =

German racewalker

Personal information
- Nationality: German
- Born: 11 March 1939
- Died: 14 July 2010 (aged 71)

Sport
- Sport: Athletics
- Event: Racewalking

Bernhard Nermerich (11 March 1939 – 14 July 2010) was a German racewalker. He competed in the men's 50 kilometres walk at the 1968 Summer Olympics.
