= Gizela Farkaš =

Serbian middle-distance runner

Medal record

Representing Yugoslavia

European Indoor Games
Silver medal – second place	1967 Prague	Medley Relay (1500 m)

Gizela Farkaš Todorović (born 22 October 1942, in Novi Sad) is a Serbian former middle distance runner who ran for Yugoslavia in the 800m semi final at the 1964 Summer Olympics.
