= Anita Wörner =

German middle-distance runner

Personal information
- Nationality: German
- Born: 24 February 1942 (age 84) Eisenberg in der Pfalz, Rheinland-Pfalz, Germany
- Height: 174 cm (5 ft 9 in)
- Weight: 63 kg (139 lb)

Sport
- Sport: Athletics
- Event: Middle-distance running
- Club: VTV Mundenheim

Anita Wörner (born 24 February 1942) is a German middle-distance runner who competed at the 1964 Summer Olympics.

== Biography ==
At the 1964 Olympic Games in Tokyo, Wörner competed in the women's 800 metres competition.

Wörner finished third behind Joy Jordan in the 880 yards event at the 1962 WAAA Championships.
