= Maryvonne Dupureur =

French middle-distance runner

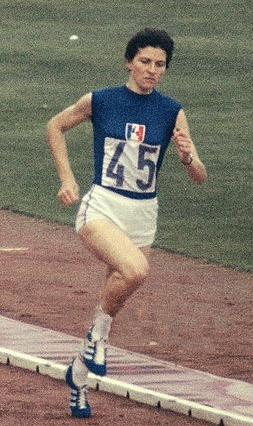
- Dupureur at the 1964 Olympics

Personal information
- Full name: Marie-Yvonne Dupureur
- Born: 24 May 1937 Saint-Brieuc, France
- Died: 7 January 2008 (aged 70) Saint-Brieuc, France
- Height: 1.67 m (5 ft 6 in)
- Weight: 58 kg (128 lb)

Sport
- Sport: Athletics
- Event: 800 m
- Club: ASPTT Lille, AL Saint-Brieuc

Achievements and titles
- Personal best: 2:01.9 (1964)
Medal record
Women's athletics
Representing France
Olympic Games
Silver medal – second place	1964 Tokyo	800 m
European Indoor Games
Silver medal – second place	1967 Prague	800 m

Maryvonne Dupureur (née Samson, 24 May 1937 – 7 January 2008) was a French middle-distance runner. Competing in the 800 m event she won silver medals at the 1964 Olympics and 1967 European Indoor Games; she also took part in the 1960 and 1968 Olympics.

Between 1959 and 1969 Dupureur won ten national titles: six in the 800 m, three in the 400 m and one in the 1500 m. She was an Olympic silver medalist in the 800 metres in Tokyo in 1964 after leading for most of the race but being overtaken in the final 100 metres by Great Britain’s Ann Packer, who set a new world record. Dupurer lived for many years in Brittany, and taught physical education and sport at a high school in Saint-Brieuc until her retirement.
