= Dixie Willis =

Australian middle-distance runner

Personal information
- Born: 13 December 1941 (age 84)
Medal record
Women's Athletics
Representing Australia
Commonwealth Games
Gold medal – first place	1962 Perth	880 yards

Dixie Isabel Willis (later Booth, then Ingram) (born 13 December 1941 in Fremantle, Western Australia) is a former Australian middle distance runner, who won the gold medal in the women's 880 yards event at the 1962 Commonwealth Games. She was selected to compete over 800 metres for her native country at two consecutive Summer Olympics. At Rome in 1960 she was leading the final with 70 metres remaining when she fell off the track. She then regained the track to finish last. In 1964 at Tokyo she was unable to compete due to injury.

On 3 March 1962 she set world records for 800 metres (2:01.2) and 880 yards (2:02.0) in narrowly beating Marise Chamberlain (2:01.4 and 2:02.3) who also beat the previous world records. She broke the world record for the women's 440 yards in Brisbane in 1963 alongside Betty Cuthbert.

Records
Preceded by (Soviet Union) Lyudmila Shevtsova	Women's 800 metres World Record Holder; 1962-03-03 – 1964-10-20	Succeeded by (United Kingdom) Ann Packer
