= Anneliese Gerhards =

German javelin thrower

Personal information
- Nationality: German
- Born: 4 July 1935 (age 90) Oedt, Grefrath, Germany
- Height: 174 cm (5 ft 9 in)
- Weight: 72 kg (159 lb)

Sport
- Sport: Athletics
- Event: Javelin throw
- Club: Bayer 04 Leverkusen

Anneliese Gerhards (born 4 July 1935) is a German retired athlete who competed in the javelin throw at three Olympic Games.

== Biography ==
At the 1960 Olympic Games in Rome, Gerhards finished 11th in the javelin throw event.

Gerhards won the British WAAA Championships title at the 1963 WAAA Championships and the 1964 WAAA Championships.

Shortly afterwards at the 1964 Olympic Games in Tokyo, Gerhards competed in the Athletics at the women's javelin again and finished 8th.

Gerhards went to her third Olympic Games in 1972, finishing 9th in the javelin event.
