= Dirk Wippermann =

German discus thrower (born 1946)

Dirk Wippermann (born 27 January 1946) is a German former discus thrower who competed in the 1972 Summer Olympics.
