= Jette Andersen (runner) =

Danish middle-distance runner

Personal information
- Nationality: Danish
- Born: 29 August 1945 (age 80) Århus, Denmark

Sport
- Sport: Middle-distance running
- Event: 800 metres

Jette Andersen (born 29 August 1945) is a Danish retired middle-distance runner. She competed in the women's 800 metres at the 1964 Summer Olympics.
