= Jannie van Eyck-Vos =

Dutch athlete (1936–2020)

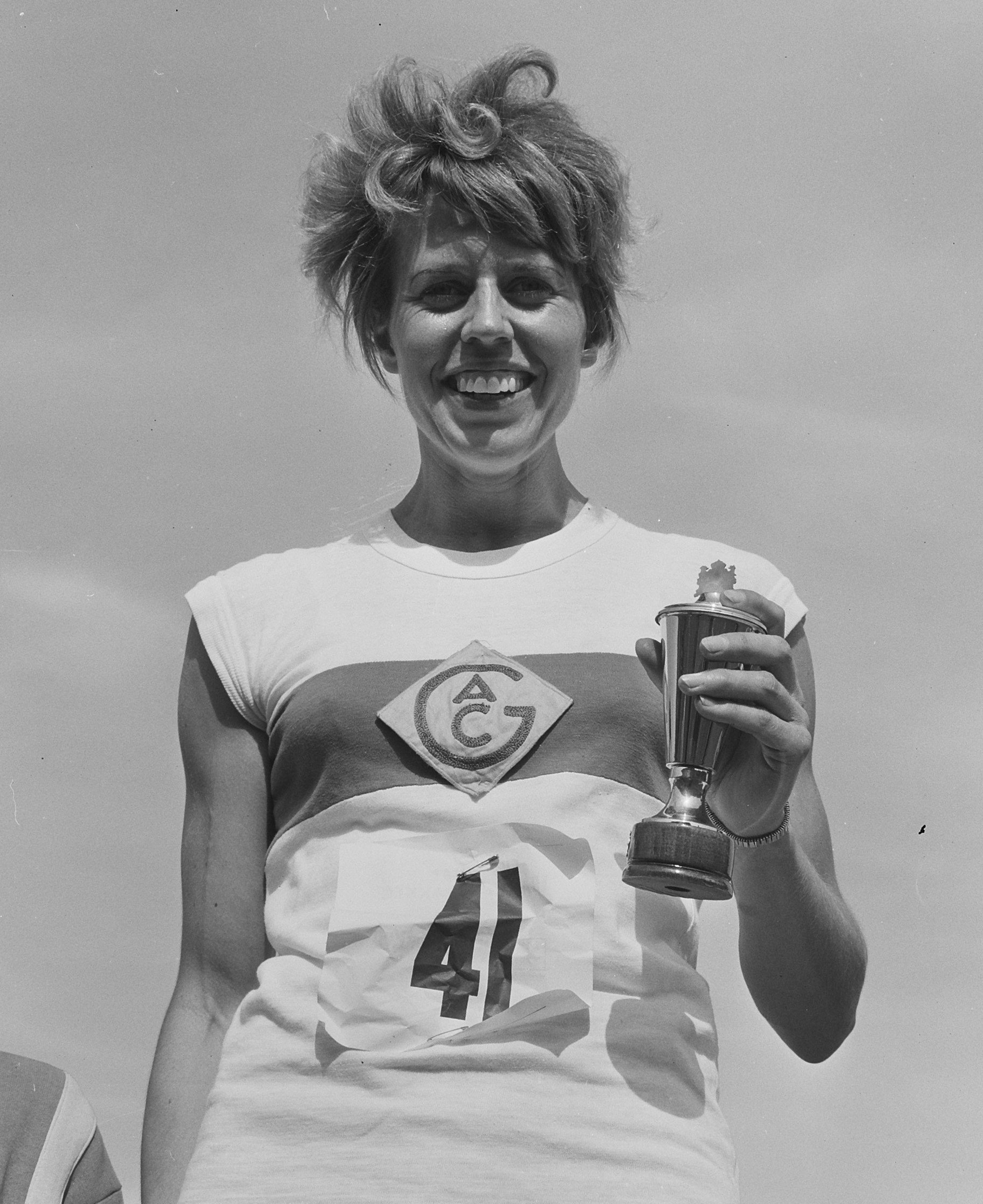
- Jannie van Eyck-Vos in 1965

Personal information
- Born: 19 January 1936 Hilversum, the Netherlands
- Died: 16 June 2020 (aged 84)
- Height: 1.68 m (5 ft 6 in)
- Weight: 60 kg (130 lb)

Sport
- Sport: Running
- Club: GAC, Hilversum

Johanna "Jannie" van Eyck-Vos (19 January 1936 – 16 June 2020) was a Dutch track and field athlete. She competed at the 1964 Summer Olympics in the 800 m event but failed to reach the final despite setting a personal record. She started as a javelin thrower and won a national title in 1956, but then changed to middle-distance running and won another title, in 1966, in the 800 m.
