= Karin Kessler =

German athletics competitor

Personal information
- Born: Karin Rettmeyer; March 25, 1939 (age 87) Hamburg, Germany

Sport
- Sport: Track and field
- Event: 800 metres
- Club: Düsseldorfer SV 04; LG Alstertal / Garstedt Hamburg
Medal record
Women's Athletics
Representing Germany
European Indoor Games
| Gold medal – first place | 1967 Prague | 800 metres |
| Silver medal – second place | 1966 Dortmund | 800 metres |

Karin Kessler (née Rettmeyer; born 25 March 1939) is a German female former track and field athlete who competed for West Germany in the 800 metres. She was the gold medallist in that event at the 1967 European Indoor Games, having been runner-up to Zsuzsa Szabó the previous year at the 1966 European Indoor Games. Kessler also represented her country at the 1966 European Athletics Championships, reaching the semi-finals. She set a personal best of 2:03.6 minutes in 1967, which was a West German record for the Hamburg-born athlete.

Kessler was a five-time national champion individually, taking both indoor and outdoor 800 m titles in 1966 and 1967, as well as a short course cross country title in 1966. During her career she was a member of Düsseldorfer SV 04 and LG Alstertal / Garstedt Hamburg clubs.

== International competitions ==
| Year | Competition | Venue | Position | Event | Notes |
|---|---|---|---|---|---|
| 1966 | European Indoor Games | Dortmund, West Germany | 2nd | 800 m | 2:10.8 |
| 1966 | European Championships | Budapest, Hungary | 6th (semis) | 800 m | 2:08.0 |
| 1967 | European Indoor Games | Prague, Czechoslovakia | 1st | 800 m | 2:08.2 |

== National titles ==
- West German Athletics Championships
  - 800 m: 1966, 1967
- West German Indoor Athletics Championships
  - 800 m: 1966, 1967
- West German Cross Country Championships
  - Short course: 1967

== See also ==
- List of European Athletics Indoor Championships medalists (women)
