= Hubert Riesner =

German long-distance runner (born 1946)

Personal information
- Nationality: German
- Born: 18 August 1946 (age 79) Frankfurt, Germany

Sport
- Sport: Long-distance running
- Event: Marathon

Hubert Riesner (born 18 August 1946) is a German long-distance runner. He competed in the marathon at the 1968 Summer Olympics representing West Germany.
