= Florica Grecescu =

Romanian middle-distance runner

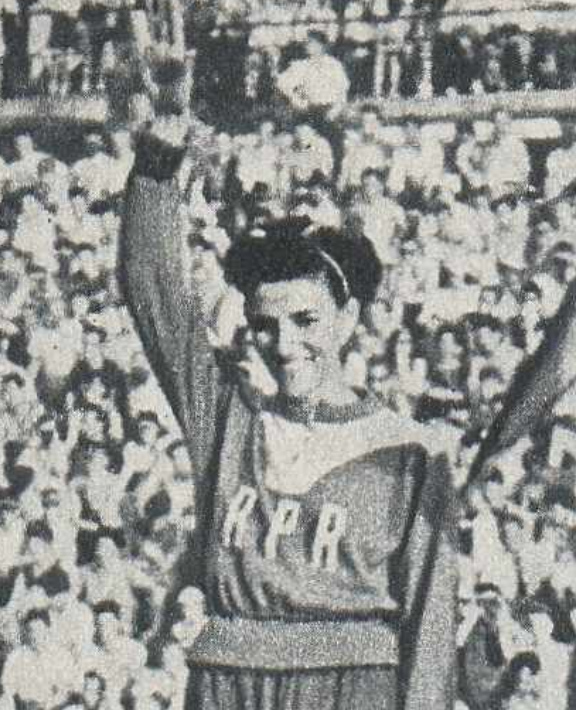

Personal information
- Nationality: Romanian
- Born: 31 August 1932 (age 94) Timișoara, Romania

Sport
- Sport: Middle-distance running
- Event: 800 metres
Medal record
Representing Romania
Summer Universiade
Silver medal – second place	1961 Sofia	800m

Florica Grecescu (born 31 August 1932) is a Romanian middle-distance runner. She competed in the women's 800 metres at the 1960 Summer Olympics.
