= Jens Knipphals =

German long jumper (born 1958)

Jens Knipphals (born 19 May 1958) is a retired West German long jumper.

He finished eighth at the 1978 European Indoor Championships and won the bronze medal at the 1983 European Indoor Championships. He became West German champion in 1979 and 1980, representing the sports club VfL Wolfsburg.

His personal best jump was 8.14 metres, achieved in May 1980 in East Berlin.

His son, Sven Knipphals, is a sprinter.
