= Antje Gleichfeld =

German middle-distance runner

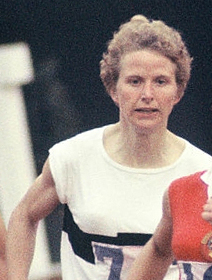
- Antje Gleichfeld at the 1964 Olympics

Personal information
- Born: Antje Braasch; 31 March 1938 (age 88) Hamburg, Germany
- Height: 1.78 m (5 ft 10 in)
- Weight: 69 kg (152 lb)

Sport
- Sport: Athletics
- Event: 800 m
- Club: TuS Alstertal, Hamburg

Achievements and titles
- Personal best: 800 m – 2:03.7 (1966)
Medal record
Women's athletics
Representing West Germany
European Championships
Bronze medal – third place	1966 Budapest	800 m
Bronze medal – third place	1969 Athens	4 × 400 m relay
Summer Universiade
Gold medal – first place	1961 Sofia	800 m
Silver medal – second place	1963 Porto Alegre	800m
Silver medal – second place	1963 Porto Alegre	4x100m relay
Silver medal – second place	1965 Budapest	800m
Bronze medal – third place	1959 Turin	4x100m relay

Antje Gleichfeld (née Braasch; born 31 March 1938) is a retired German middle-distance runner.

== Biography ==
Gleichfeld's father was killed on the fronts of World War II, and she had to take odd jobs from the age of six to help support her family. As a teenager she played handball before changing to athletics.

Competing in the 800 m Gleichfeld finished fifth at the Olympic Games in 1960 and 1964; she won a bronze medal at the 1966 European Championships. She also won three medals at the Universiade; a gold in 1961 and silver medals in 1963 and 1965. At the 1969 European Championships she won a bronze medal in the 4 × 400 m relay, together with teammates Christa Czekay, Inge Eckhoff and Christel Frese.

Domestically she represented the sports club LG Alstertal-Garstedt. She became West German 800 m outdoor champion in 1961, 1963, 1964, 1965 and 1966, and indoor champion in 1962 and 1965. In the 400 metres she became West German champion in 1965.

Gleichfeld set three world records: in the 800 m indoor in 1965 (2:07.1), in the 4 × 400 m relay in 1969 (3:33.9) and in the 3×800 m relay in 1967 (6:21.0), as well as one European and eight national records. In 1964 she became the first German woman to run 800 m faster than 2:05 minutes. The same year she was awarded the Silver Bay Leaf by the German Track and Field Association. She married Detlev Gleichfeld, also a middle-distance runner.
