= Zsuzsa Szabó =

Hungarian middle-distance runner

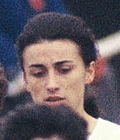
- Zsuzsa Szabó at the 1964 Olympics

Personal information
- Born: 16 January 1940 (age 86) Pécs, Baranya, Hungary
- Height: 1.65 m (5 ft 5 in)
- Weight: 53 kg (117 lb)

Sport
- Sport: Athletics
- Event: 800 m
- Club: BEAC, Budapest

Achievements and titles
- Personal best: 2:03.1 (1966)
Medal record
Women's athletics
Representing Hungary
European Championships
Silver medal – second place	1966 Budapest	800 m
European Indoor Games
Gold medal – first place	1966 Dortmund	800 m

Zsuzsa Szabó, née Zsuzsa Nagy, (16 January 1940) is a retired Hungarian middle-distance runner. She competed at the 1964 Olympics in the 800 m and finished in fourth place. Two years later she won a gold and a silver medal in this event at the European indoor and outdoor championships, respectively.
