= Olga Kazi =

Hungarian runner (born 1941)

Personal information
- Born: 10 May 1941 (age 85) Budapest, Hungary
Medal record
Women's athletics
Representing Hungary
European Championships
Bronze medal – third place	1962 Belgrade	800 m
Summer Universiade
Gold medal – first place	1963 Porto Alegre	800 m

Olga Kazi (born 10 May 1941 in Kispest, Budapest) is a retired female middle-distance runner from Hungary. She is a multiple Hungarian Athletics Championships winner, having collected two gold medals in 400 metres, five on 800 metres and one each in 1500 metres and cross country running. In addition Kazi twice represented her native country at the Summer Olympics: in 1960 and 1964. She set her personal best in the women's 800 metres (2:05.0) on 16 September 1962 at the European Championships in Belgrade.

== Personal life ==
Kazi married to fellow Olympian István Gyulai, with whom she had two children, Miklós and Katalin.
