= Vera Mukhanova =

Personal information
- Nationality: Soviet
- Born: 24 September 1937
- Died: August 2016

Sport
- Sport: Middle-distance running
- Event: 800 metres

Vera Mukhanova (24 September 1937 – August 2016) was a Soviet middle-distance runner. She competed in the women's 800 metres at the 1964 Summer Olympics.
