= 800 metres world record progression =

The following tables show the world record progression in the men's and women's 800 metres, officially ratified by World Athletics.

== Men ==
Peter Snell in 1962, about to set an 880 yd world record; the hand timers and photo finish equipment in the background have registered his 800 m world record en route.

The first world record in the men's 800 metres was recognized by the International Association of Athletics Federations in 1912.

Ratified
Not ratified
Ratified but later rescinded
Pending ratification

=== Indoor ===
Indoor records are run over four laps of a shorter 200 m track. "y" indicates marks were set over the 880 yards (804.67 m) imperial distance, and an asterisk indicates a record was repeated. All records since Coe's 1:44.91 in 1983 were ratified by the IAAF.

Men's indoor 800 metres world record progression
Time	Athlete	Nationality	Location of race	Date
1:54.6y	Eli Parsons	United States	Buffalo, United States	19 March 1904
1:54.0	Alan Helffrich	United States	Washington, D.C., United States	21 February 1925
1:53.8y	Lloyd Hahn	United States	New York, United States	8 January 1928
1:51.4y	Lloyd Hahn	United States	New York, United States	3 March 1928
[1:47.7]	John Woodruff	United States	Hanover, United States	14 March 1940
1:51.4y	John Borican	United States	New York, United States	21 February 1942
1:50.0	John Borican	United States	New York, United States	25 March 1942
1:49.7	Arnold Sowell	United States	New York, United States	9 February 1957
1:49.9y	Peter Snell	New Zealand	Tokyo, Japan	18 March 1962
1:49.5	Jörg Lawrenz	West Germany	West Berlin	9 March 1963
1:49.5*	Bill Crothers	Canada	New York, United States	30 January 1964
1:49.8y	Peter Farrell	United States	New York, United States	11 February 1965
1:47.4	Ted Nelson	United States	West Berlin	7 April 1965
1:46.6	Dieter Fromm	East Germany	Belgrade, Yugoslavia	8 March 1969
1:46.37	Carlo Grippo	Italy	Milan, Italy	24 February 1977
1:46.0	Sebastian Coe	Great Britain	Cosford, United Kingdom	11 February 1981
1:44.91	Sebastian Coe	Great Britain	Cosford, United Kingdom	12 March 1983
1:44.84	Paul Ereng	Kenya	Budapest, Hungary	4 March 1989
1:43.96	Wilson Kipketer	Denmark	Paris, France	7 March 1997
1:42.67	Wilson Kipketer	Denmark	Paris, France	9 March 1997
1:42.50	Josh Hoey	United States	Boston, United States	24 January 2026

=== Outdoor ===
As of June 21, 2011, 23 world records have been ratified by the IAAF in the event. "y" denotes time for 880 yards (804.68 m) ratified as a record for the 800 m.

Pre-IAAF records
Mark	Athlete	Nationality	Location	Date
2:06.0y	A. Wood	Great Britain	Unknown	1830
2:05.0y	J. Blackwood	Great Britain	Addiscombe, United Kingdom	25 April 1857
2:04.0y	Wiliam Way	Great Britain	Oxford, United Kingdom	25 November 1859
2:03.0y	Charlie Grey	Ireland	Dublin, Ireland	27 June 1861
2:03.0y	Percy Thornton	Great Britain	London, United Kingdom	16 December 1865
2:02.5y	Percy Thornton	Great Britain	London, United Kingdom	16 December 1865
2:02.4y	Francis Pelham	Great Britain	Cambridge, United Kingdom	23 March 1867
2:01.0y	Kinross Gair	Great Britain	Edinburgh, United Kingdom	26 June 1867
2:01.0y	George Templer	United States	London, United Kingdom	27 March 1872
2:01.0y	Thomas Christie	United States	London, United Kingdom	27 March 1872
1:59.8y	Arthur Pelham	Great Britain	Cambridge, United Kingdom	26 March 1873
1:59.5y	Walter Slade	Great Britain	Dublin, Ireland	5 June 1876
1:58.8y	Walter Slade	Great Britain	Dublin, Ireland	6 June 1876
1:58.2y	Walter Slade	Great Britain	Belfast, United Kingdom	10 June 1876
1:57.5y	Frederic Elborough	Great Britain	London, United Kingdom	7 October 1876
1:56.2y	Lawrence Myers	United States	New York City, United States	17 July 1880
1:55.8y	Lawrence Myers	United States	London, United Kingdom	2 July 1881
1:55.6y	Lawrence Myers	United States	New York City, United States	8 October 1881
1:55.6y	Lawrence Myers	United States	New York City, United States	16 September 1882
1:55.4y	Lawrence Myers	United States	Birmingham, United Kingdom	7 July 1884
1:55.4y	Lawrence Myers	United States	New York City, United States	3 October 1885
1:54.6y	Francis Cross	Great Britain	Oxford, United Kingdom	9 March 1888
1:54.5y	Walter Dohm	United States	New York City, United States	19 September 1891
1:53.4y	Charles Kilpatrick	United States	New York City, United States	21 September 1895
1:52.8	Melvin Sheppard	United States	London, United Kingdom	21 July 1908
1:52.1y	Emilio Lunghi	Italy	Montreal, Canada	15 September 1909

Time	Auto	Athlete	Date	Location
1:51.9+		Ted Meredith (USA)	1912-07-08	Stockholm, Sweden
1:51.6y		Otto Peltzer (GER)	1926-07-03	London, United Kingdom
1:50.6		Sera Martin (FRA)	1928-07-14	Paris, France
1:49.8	1:49.70	Tommy Hampson (GBR)	1932-08-02	Los Angeles, United States
1:49.8y		Ben Eastman (USA)	1934-06-16	Princeton, United States
1:49.7		Glenn Cunningham (USA)	1936-08-20	Stockholm, Sweden
1:49.6y		Elroy Robinson (USA)	1937-07-11	New York City, United States
1:48.4+		Sydney Wooderson (GBR)	1938-08-20	London, United Kingdom
1:46.6		Rudolf Harbig (GER)	1939-07-15	Milan, Italy
1:45.7		Roger Moens (BEL)	1955-08-03	Oslo, Norway
1:44.3+		Peter Snell (NZL)	1962-02-03	Christchurch, New Zealand
1:44.3	1:44.40	Ralph Doubell (AUS)	1968-10-15	Mexico City, Mexico
1:44.3		Dave Wottle (USA)	1972-07-01	Eugene, United States
1:43.7		Marcello Fiasconaro (ITA)	1973-06-27	Milan, Italy
1:43.5	1:43.50	Alberto Juantorena (CUB)	1976-07-25	Montreal, Canada
1:43.4	1:43.44	Alberto Juantorena (CUB)	1977-08-21	Sofia, Bulgaria
1:42.4	1:42.33	Sebastian Coe (GBR)	1979-07-05	Oslo, Norway
1:41.73		Sebastian Coe (GBR)	1981-06-10	Florence, Italy
1:41.73		Wilson Kipketer (DEN)	1997-07-07	Stockholm, Sweden
1:41.24		Wilson Kipketer (DEN)	1997-08-13	Zurich, Switzerland
1:41.11		Wilson Kipketer (DEN)	1997-08-24	Cologne, Germany
1:41.09		David Rudisha (KEN)	2010-08-22	Berlin, Germany
1:41.01		David Rudisha (KEN)	2010-08-29	Rieti, Italy
1:40.91		David Rudisha (KEN)	2012-08-09	London, United Kingdom

(+) - indicates en route time from longer race.

The "Time" column indicates the ratified mark; the "Auto" column indicates a fully automatic time that was also recorded in the event when hand-timed marks were used for official records, or which was the basis for the official mark, rounded to the 10th of a second, depending on the rules then in place.

Auto times to the hundredth of a second were accepted by the IAAF for events up to and including 10,000 m from 1981. Hence, Sebastian Coe's record at 1:42.4 was rendered as 1:42.33 from that year.

== Women ==
The first world record in the women's 800 metres was recognized by the Fédération Sportive Féminine Internationale (FSFI) in 1922, which was absorbed by the International Association of Athletics Federations in 1936.

As of June 21, 2009, the IAAF (and the FSFI before it) have ratified 29 outdoor world records in the event. "y" denotes time for 880 yards (804.672 m) ratified as a record for the 800 m.

=== Indoor ===
Indoor records are run over four laps of a shorter 200 m track. "y" indicates marks were set over the 880 yards (804.67 m) imperial distance, and an asterisk indicates a record was repeated. All records since Wodar's 1:58.42 in 1987 were ratified by the IAAF.

Women's indoor 800 metres world record progression
Time	Athlete	Nationality	Location	Date
2:38.6 y	Catherine Donovan	United States	Newark, United States	28 January 1928
2:22.6 h	Polina Solopova	Soviet Union	Leningrad, Soviet Union	17 March 1951
2:19.9 h	Anna Dyachkova	Soviet Union	Leningrad, Soviet Union	18 March 1952
2:17.1 h	Aleksandra Kiryushkina	Soviet Union	Leningrad, Soviet Union	1 March 1953
2:15.5 h	Galina Falkovskaya	Soviet Union	Leningrad, Soviet Union	16 March 1953
2:12.5 h	Bedřiška Müllerová	Czechoslovakia	East Berlin, East Germany	26 February 1961
2:10.9 h	Anita Wörner	West Germany	West Berlin	9 March 1963
2:10.6 h	Irene Hansen	East Germany	East Berlin, East Germany	13 February 1965
2:10.5 y	Zsuzsa Nagy	Hungary	Los Angeles, United States	13 February 1965
2:09.4 h	Gertrud Schmidt	East Germany	East Berlin, East Germany	21 February 1965
2:07.1 h	Antje Gleichfeld	West Germany	West Berlin	8 April 1965
2:06.2 h	Karin Burneleit	East Germany	East Berlin, East Germany	9 February 1968
2:05.3 h	Barbara Wieck	East Germany	Belgrade, Yugoslavia	9 March 1969
2:03.3 h	Hildegard Falck	West Germany	Kiel, West Germany	27 February 1971
2:03.2 h	Svetla Zlateva	Bulgaria	Sofia, Bulgaria	18 February 1973
2:02.9 h	Svetla Zlateva	Bulgaria	Lyon, France	25 February 1973
2:02.65	Stefka Yordanova	Bulgaria	Rotterdam, Netherlands	11 March 1973
2:01.8 h	Mary Decker-Slaney	United States	San Diego, United States	17 February 1974
2:01.1 h	Nikolina Shtereva	Bulgaria	Sofia, Bulgaria	25 January 1976
2:01.12	Jane Colebrook-Finch	Great Britain	San Sebastián, Spain	13 March 1977
1:59.9 h	Ursula Hook	West Germany	Dortmund, West Germany	21 January 1979
1:58.4 h	Olga Vakhrusheva	Soviet Union	Moscow, Soviet Union	16 February 1980
1:58.42	Sigrun Wodars	East Germany	Vienna, Austria	1 February 1987
1:57.64	Christine Wachtel	East Germany	Turin, Italy	10 February 1988
1:56.40	Christine Wachtel	East Germany	Vienna, Austria	13 February 1988
1:55.82	Jolanda Ceplak	Slovenia	Vienna, Austria	3 March 2002
1:54.87	Keely Hodgkinson	Great Britain	Lievin, France	20 February 2026

=== Outdoor ===
Time	Auto	Athlete	Date	Location
2:30.4+		Georgette Lenoir (FRA)	1922-08-20	Paris, France
2:26.6y		Mary Lines (GBR)	1922-08-30	London, United Kingdom
2:23.8		Lina Radke (GER)	1927-08-07	Breslau, Germany
2:20.4		Inga Gentzel (SWE)	1928-06-16	Stockholm, Sweden
2:19.6		Lina Radke (GER)	1928-07-01	Brieg, Germany
2:16.8		Lina Radke (GER)	1928-08-02	Amsterdam, Netherlands
2:16.4*		Zdeněk Koubek (CSK)	1934-06-14	Prague, Czechoslovakia
2:12.4*		Zdeněk Koubek (CSK)	1934-08-??	London, United Kingdom
2:15.9		Anna Larsson (SWE)	1944-08-28	Stockholm, Sweden
2:14.8		Anna Larsson (SWE)	1945-08-19	Hälsingborg, Sweden
2:13.8		Anna Larsson (SWE)	1945-08-30	Stockholm, Sweden
2:13.0		Yevdokiya Vasilyeva (URS)	1950-07-17	Moscow, Soviet Union
2:12.2		Valentina Pomogayeva (URS)	1951-07-26	Moscow, Soviet Union
2:12.0		Nina Otkalenko (URS)	1951-08-26	Minsk, Soviet Union
2:08.5		Nina Otkalenko (URS)	1952-06-15	Kyiv, Soviet Union
2:07.3		Nina Otkalenko (URS)	1953-08-27	Moscow, Soviet Union
2:06.6		Nina Otkalenko (URS)	1954-09-16	Kyiv, Soviet Union
2:05.0		Nina Otkalenko (URS)	1955-09-24	Zagreb, Yugoslavia
2:04.3		Lyudmila Shevtsova (URS)	1960-07-03	Moscow, Soviet Union
2:04.3	2:04.50	Lyudmila Shevtsova (URS)	1960-09-07	Rome, Italy
2:01.2+		Dixie Willis (AUS)	1962-03-03	Perth, Australia
2:01.1		Ann Packer (GBR)	1964-10-20	Tokyo, Japan
2:01.0		Judy Pollock (AUS)	1967-06-28	Helsinki, Finland
2:00.5		Vera Nikolic (YUG)	1968-07-20	London, United Kingdom
1:58.5	1:58.45	Hildegard Falck (FRG)	1971-07-11	Stuttgart, Germany
1:57.5	1:57.48	Svetla Zlateva (BUL)	1973-08-24	Athens, Greece
1:56.0		Valentina Gerasimova (URS)	1976-06-12	Kyiv, Soviet Union
1:54.9	1:54.94	Tatyana Kazankina (URS)	1976-07-26	Montreal, Canada
1:54.9	1:54.85	Nadezhda Olizarenko (URS)	1980-06-12	Moscow, Soviet Union
1:53.5	1:53.43	Nadezhda Olizarenko (URS)	1980-07-27	Moscow, Soviet Union
1:53.28		Jarmila Kratochvílová (TCH)	1983-07-26	Munich, West Germany

(+) – indicates en route time from longer race.
(*) – Zdeněk Koubek's world records were rescinded by the IAAF after he transitioned to become male.

The "Time" column indicates the ratified mark; the "Auto" column indicates a fully automatic time that was also recorded in the event when hand-timed marks were used for official records, or which was the basis for the official mark, rounded to the 10th of a second, depending on the rules then in place.

Auto times to the hundredth of a second were accepted by the IAAF for events up to and including 10,000 m from 1981. Hence, Nadezhda Olizarenko's record at 1:53.5 was rendered as 1:53.43 from that year.
