= Zinkensdamm metro station =

Stockholm Metro station

Zinkensdamm
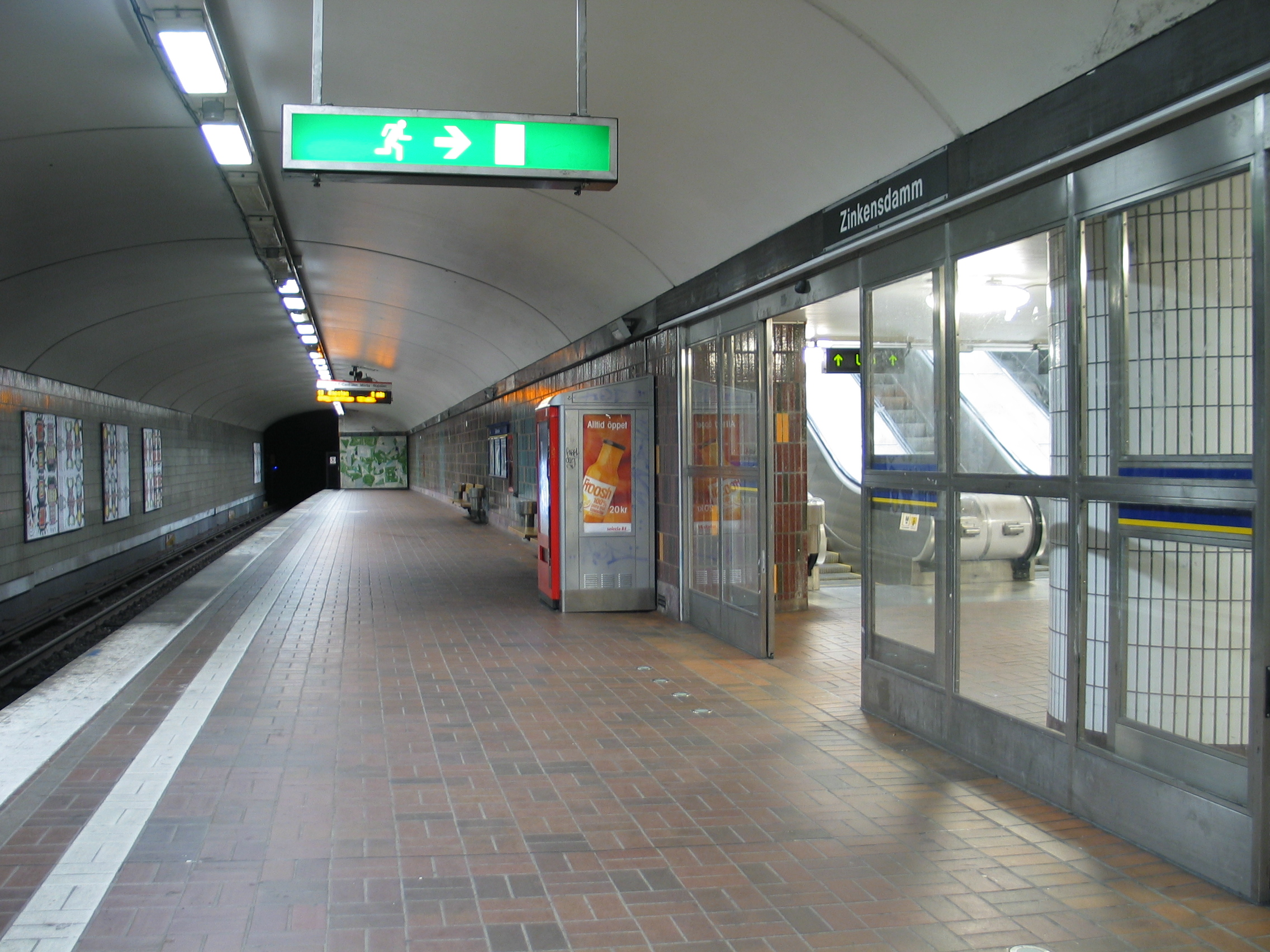
- Northbound platform

General information
- Location: Södermalm, Stockholm
- Coordinates: 59°19′04″N 18°03′00″E
- Elevation: 6.2 m (20 ft) above sea level
- System: Stockholm Metro station
- Owner: Storstockholms Lokaltrafik
- Platforms: 2 side platforms
- Tracks: 2

Construction
- Structure type: Underground
- Depth: 19 m (62 ft)
- Accessible: Yes

Other information
- Station code: ZID

History
- Opened: 5 April 1964; 62 years ago

Passengers
- 2019: 7,450 boarding per weekday

Services
Preceding station	Stockholm Metro	Following station
Hornstull towards Norsborg	Line 13	Mariatorget towards Ropsten
Hornstull towards Fruängen	Line 14	Mariatorget towards Mörby centrum
Location
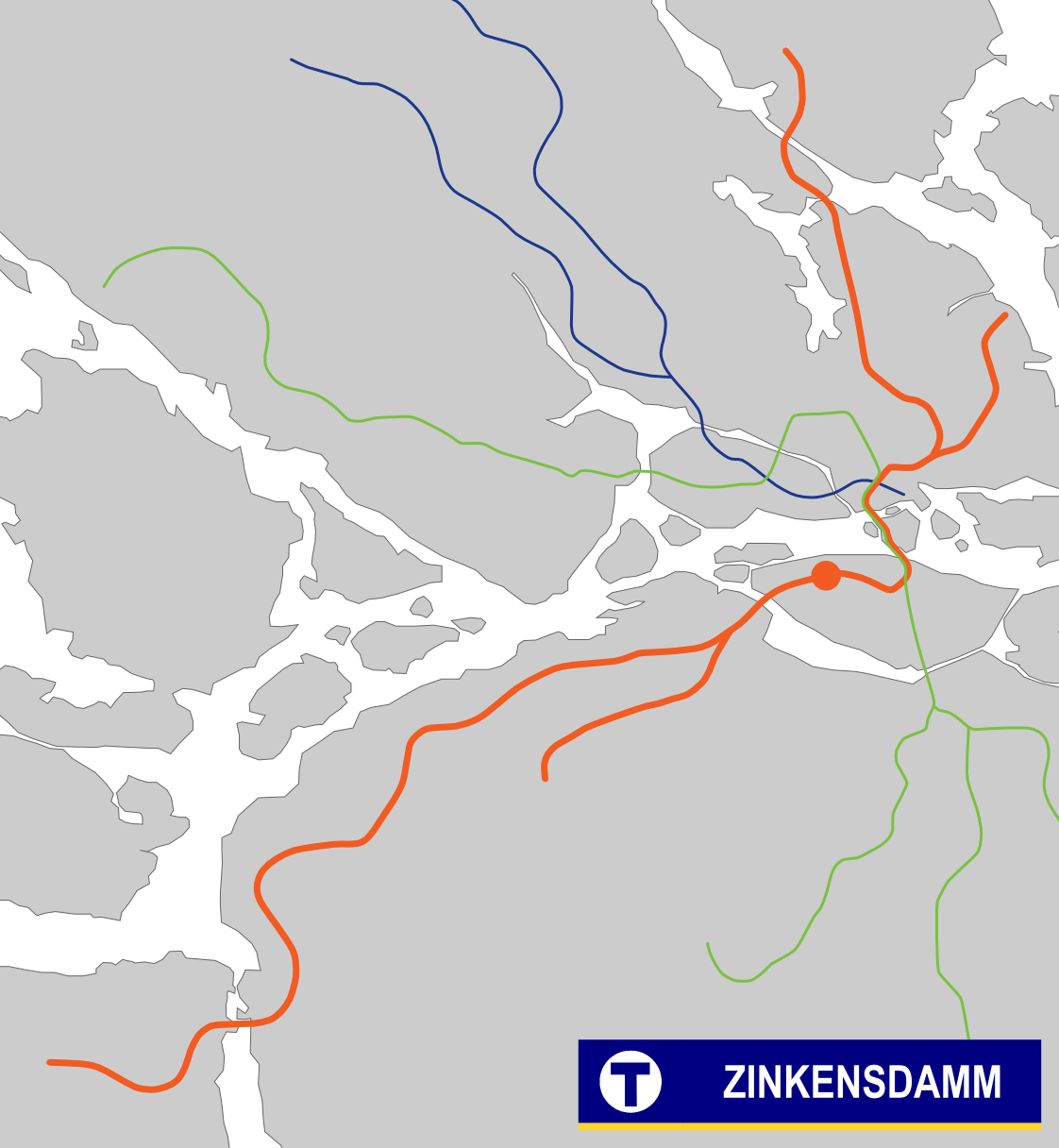

Zinkensdamm is a station on the Red Line of the Stockholm Metro, located on the island of Södermalm in Stockholm City, Sweden. It was opened on 5 April 1964 as part of the first section of the Red Line, between T-Centralen and Fruängen. The station takes its name from the Zinkensdamm area, which is known for the Zinkensdamms IP sports grounds, the Tantolunden park, and the STF Zinken hostel.

The station is 19 m (62 ft) below ground and has two tracks, each in a separate tunnel and served by a side platform. The two platforms are situated between the tracks in a back-to-back configuration and connected together by a cross tunnel, thus functioning like a single island platform.

The station has a single booking hall and barrier line that is situated below street level, and is accessed by stairs and lift from Ringvägen. Access to the platform-level cross tunnel is then by escalator and lift.

The station has platform-level murals by Göran T Karlsson and John Stenborg. John Stenborg also created a street-level wall and bench adjacent to the station entrance.

== Gallery ==
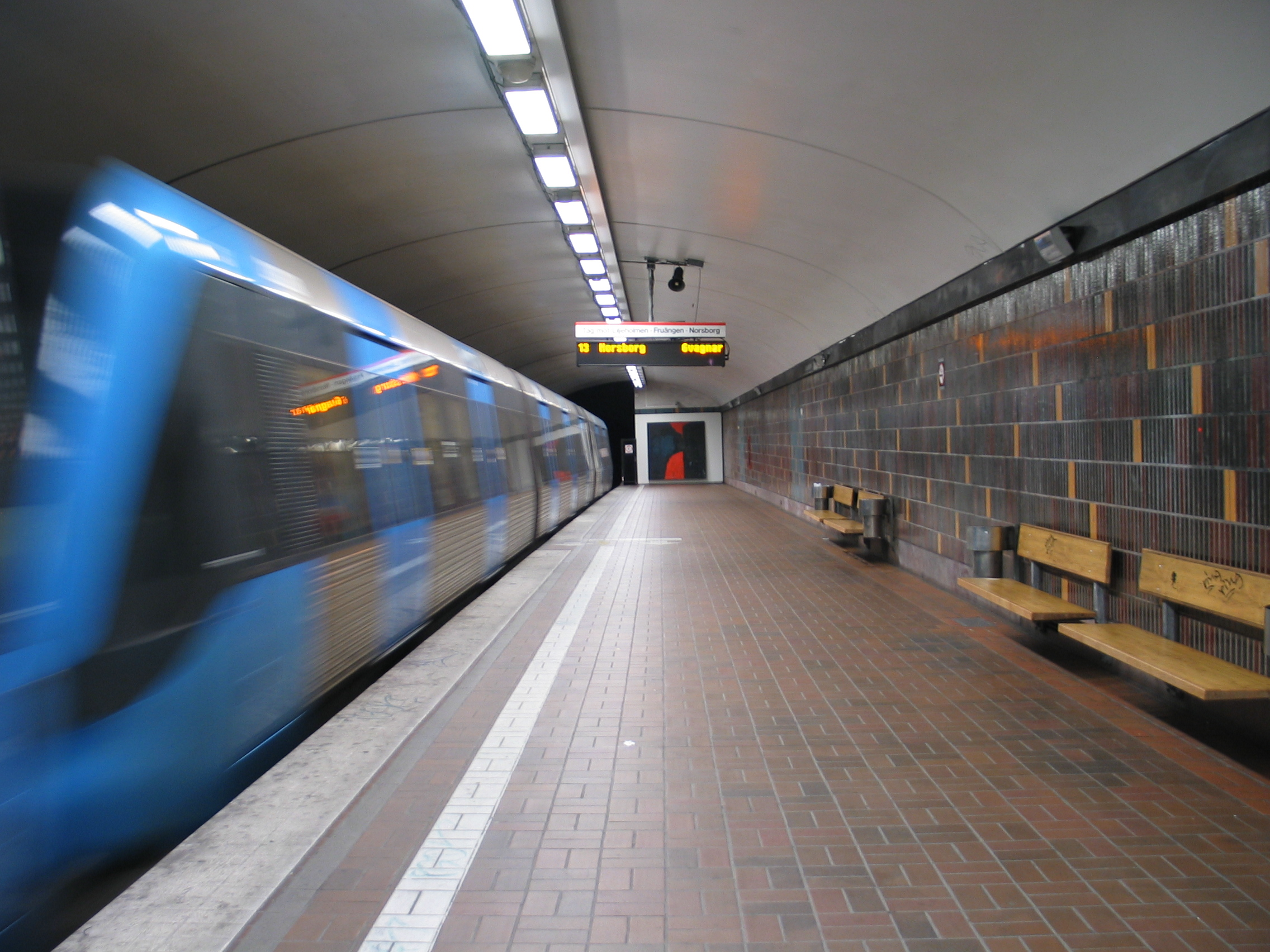
Platform

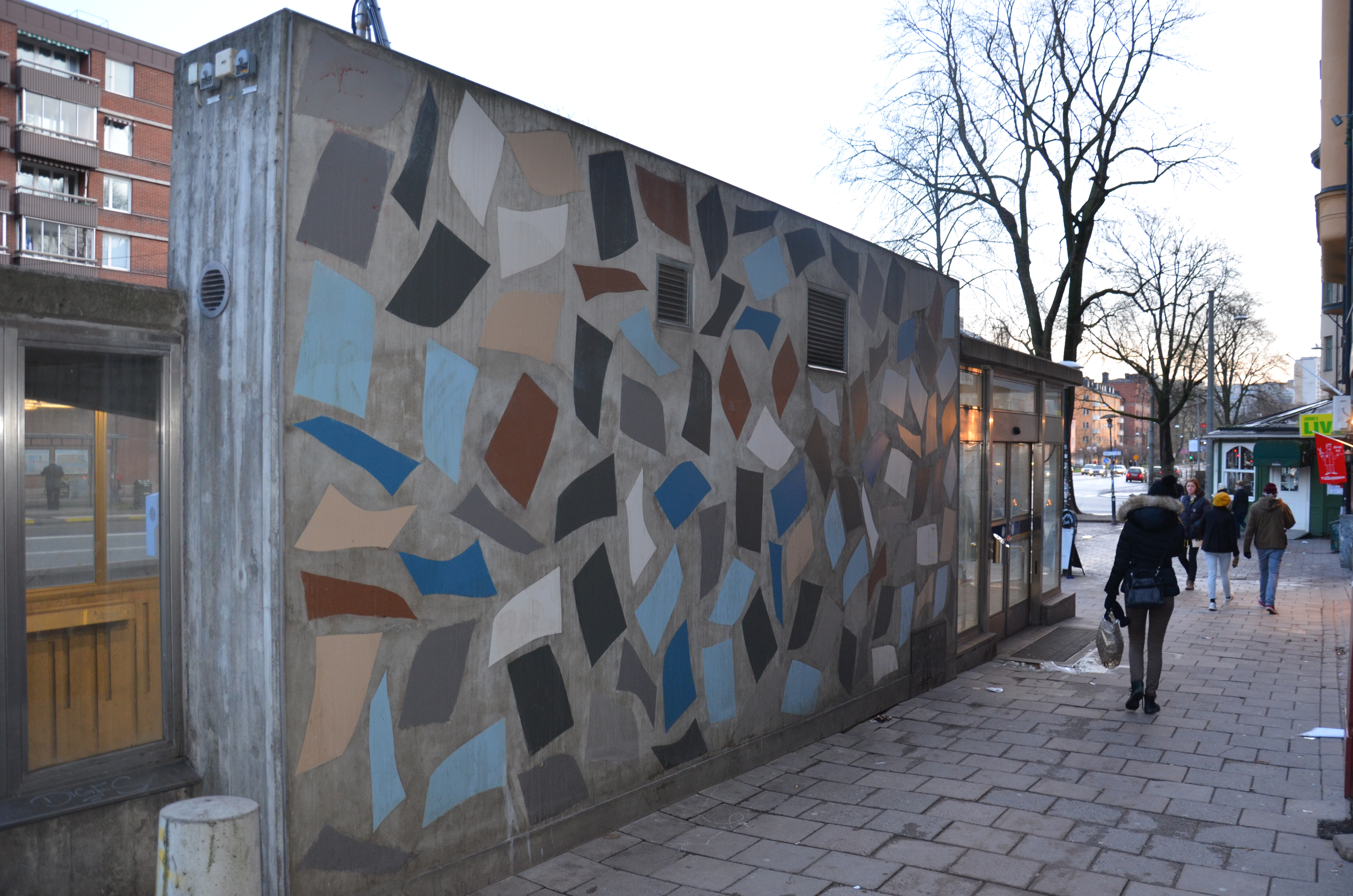
Artwork by John Stenborg the station entrance

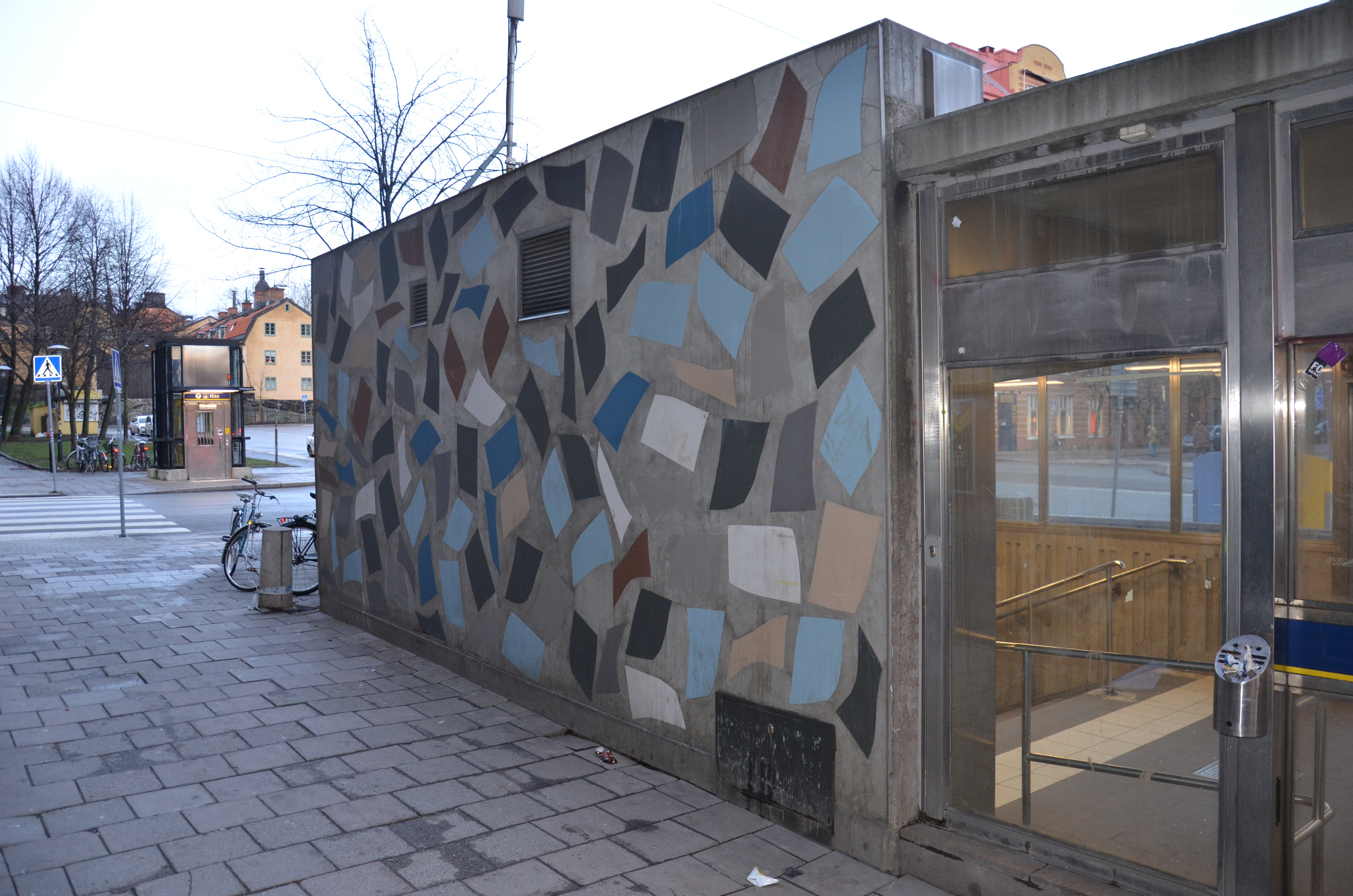
Another view of the artwork

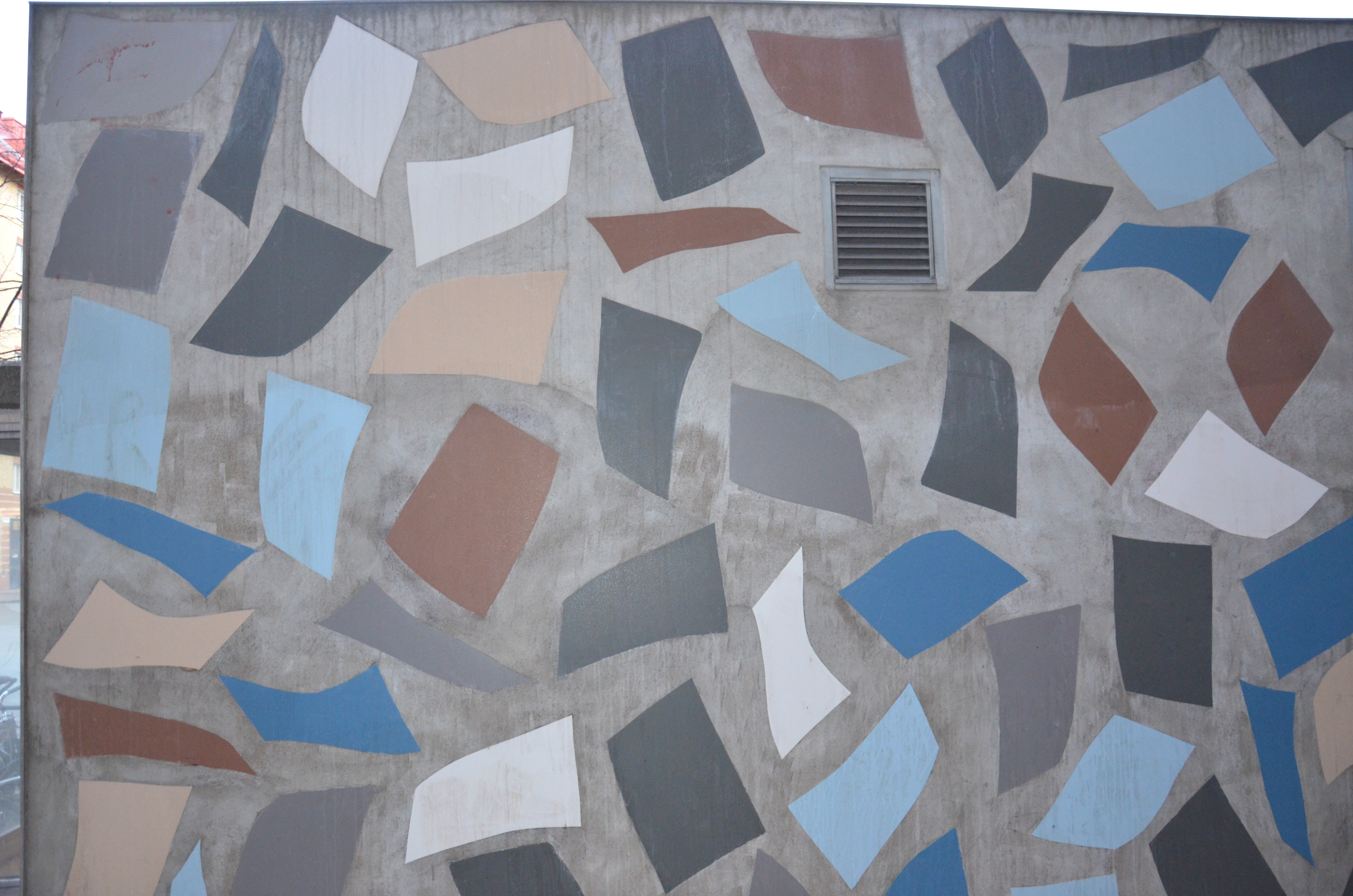
Detail of the artwork
