= Anna Larsson (runner) =

Swedish middle-distance runner

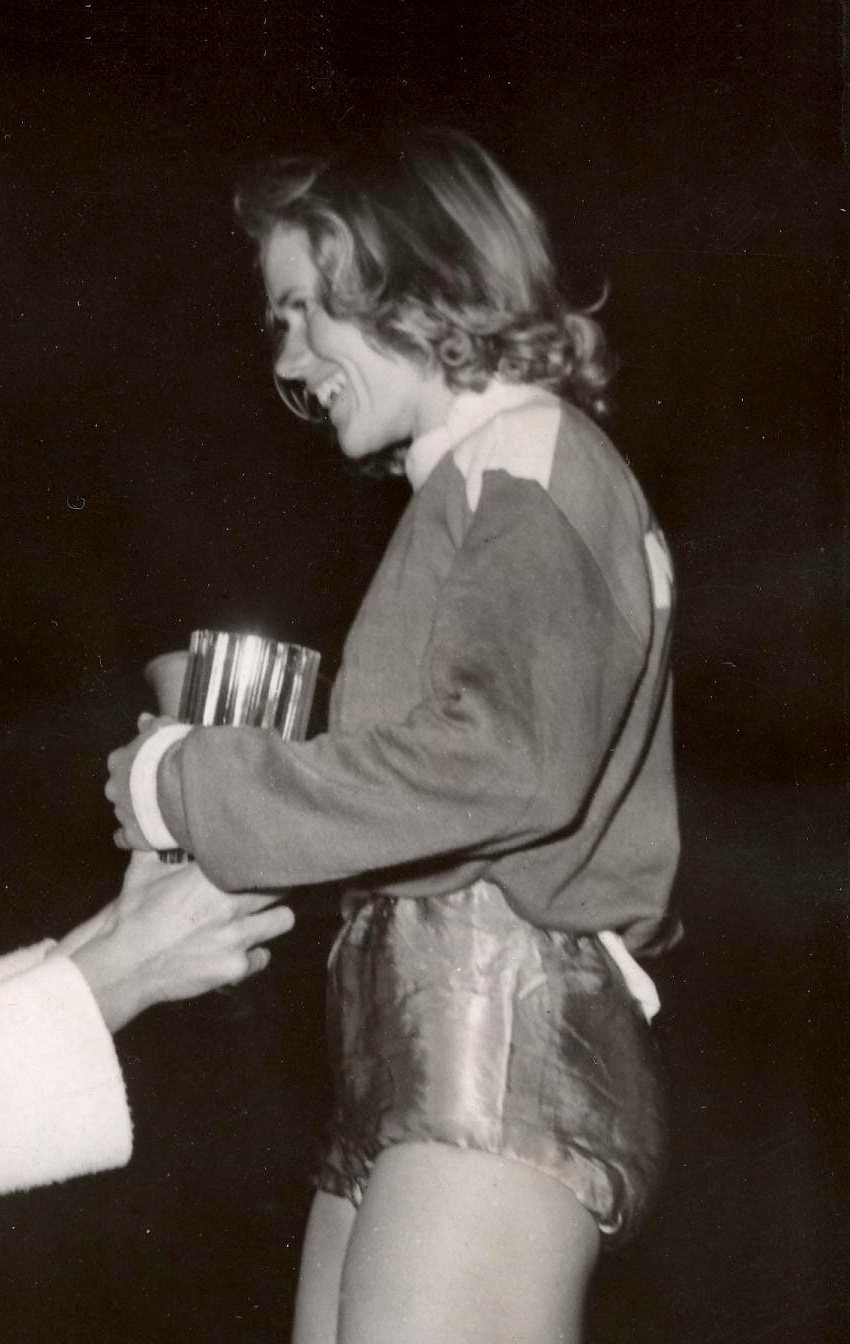
- Anna Larsson in 1945

Personal information
- Nickname: Nora-Anna
- Nationality: Swedish
- Citizenship: Swedish
- Born: 2 January 1922 Nora Mountain Parish, Sweden
- Died: 14 June 2003 (aged 81) Nora, Sweden

Sport
- Country: Sweden
- Sport: Athletics
- Event: 800 m
- Club: IFK Nora

Achievements and titles
- Personal best: 800 m – 2:13.8 (1945)

Anna "Nora-Anna" Larsson (2 January 1922 – 14 June 2003) was a Swedish middle-distance runner who set several world records in 1944–1945. After winning an 800 meters running event in 1945 she became the first woman to run a victory lap at the Stockholm Olympic Stadium.

Larsson won seven consecutive national 800 m titles in 1943–1949 and never lost an 800 m race in her career. In 1945, she was awarded the Kamratmedaljen award for best IFK performance of the year. She worked at the family farm in Öskevik outside Nora until marrying in 1947.

== World records ==
- 27 August 1944 – 800 meters, time: 2:15.9, Zinkensdamms IP, Stockholm, Sweden (Swedish national championships)
- 19 August 1945 – 800 meters, time: 2:14.8, Olympia, Helsingborg, Sweden (Swedish national championship)
- 30 August 1945 – 800 meters, time: 2:13.8, Stockholm Olympic Stadium, Stockholm, Sweden
- 5 September 1945 – 880 yards, time: 2:15.8, Stockholm Olympic Stadium, Stockholm, Sweden

Records
Preceded by (Germany) Lina Radke	Women's 800 metres World Record Holder; 1944-08-27 – 1950-07-16	Succeeded by (Soviet Union) Yevdokia Vasilyeva
