= Tantolunden =

Park in Stockholm, Sweden

Coordinates: 59°18′50″N 18°02′12″E

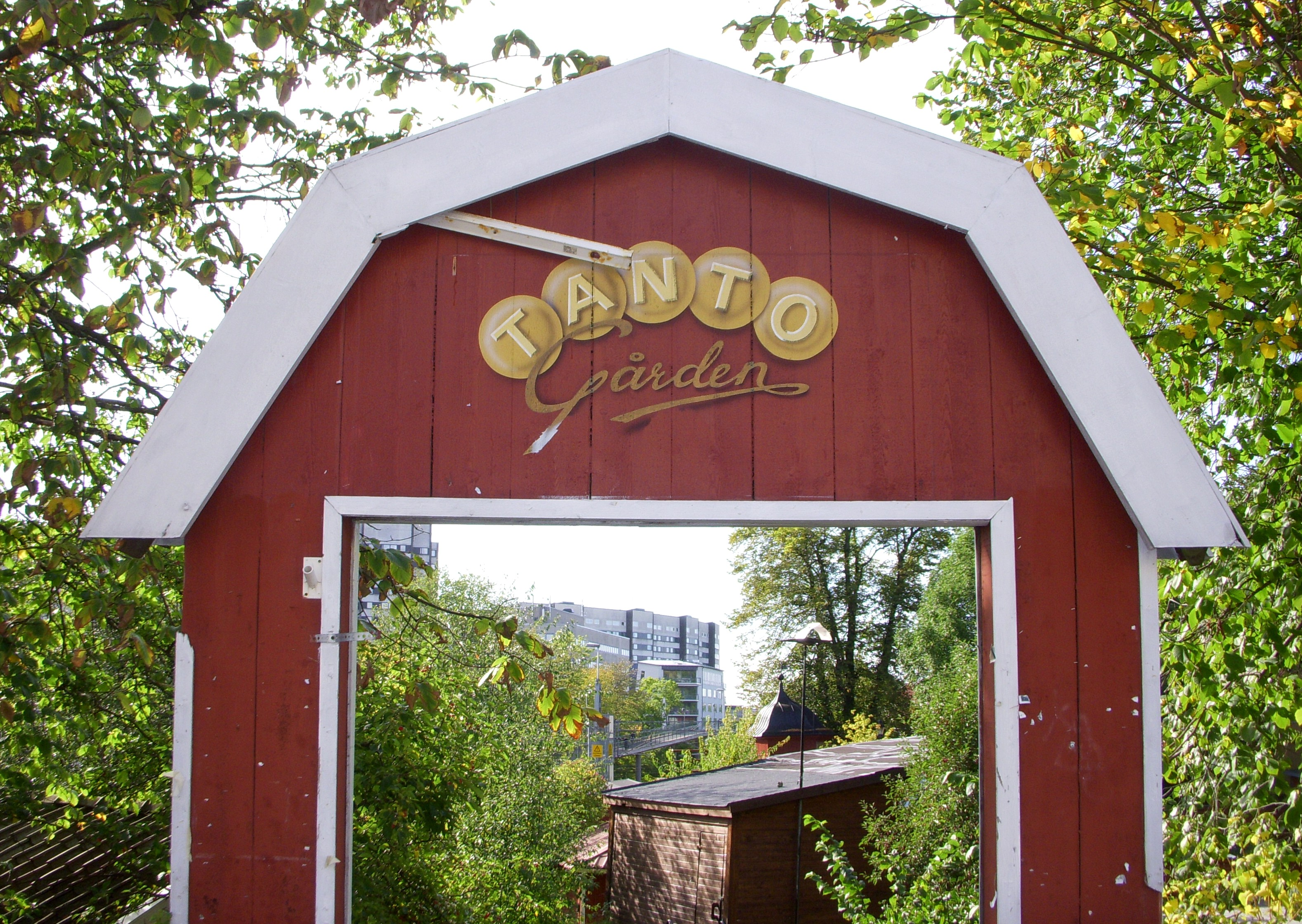
- Tantogården 2009
- Interactive map of Tantolunden
- Type: Urban park
- Location: Södermalm, Stockholm, Sweden
- Status: Open all year

Tantolunden is a park in the southern part of central Stockholm, Sweden.

Tantolunden is located in Södermalm near Zinkensdamm and Hornstull. The area is bounded by the railway in the south, the Ringvägen in the east, the Drakenberg area in the north and Lake Årstaviken in the southwest. The park was designed in 1885 by Swedish garden architect Alfred Medin (1841-1910). The construction work continued until 1899, when it was considered that the park was completed. In 1906 a playground was arranged in the western part of the park.
