= Nina Otkalenko =

Soviet distance runner

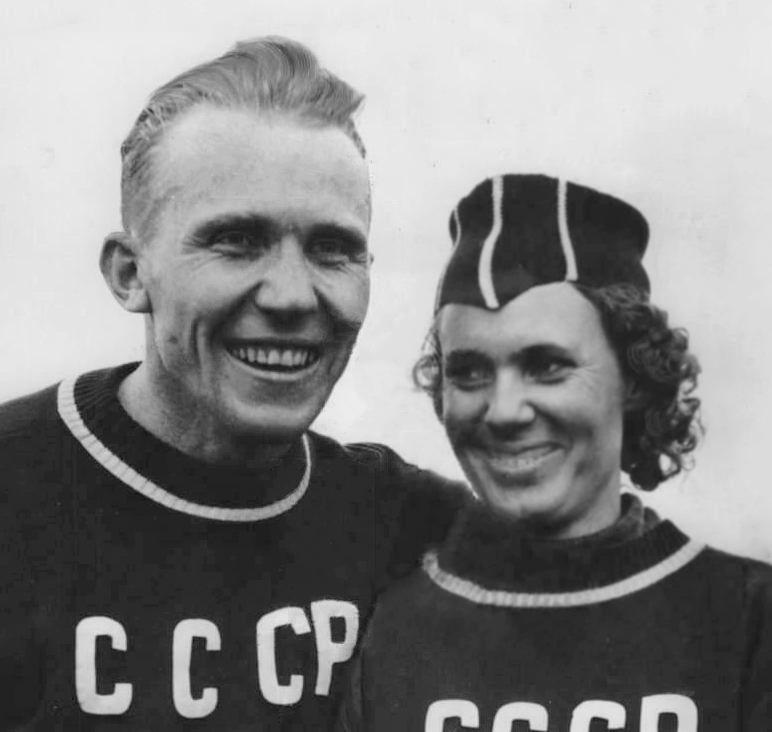
- Otkalenko with Vladimir Kuts

Personal information
- Born: 23 May 1928 Kursk Oblast, Russia
- Died: 13 May 2015 (aged 86) Moscow, Russia

Sport
- Sport: Athletics
- Event: 400–1500 m
- Club: CSKA Moscow

Achievements and titles
- Personal best(s): 400 m – 55.0 (1955); 800 m – 2:05.0 (1955)
Medal record
Women's athletics
Representing the Soviet Union
European championships
Gold medal – first place	1954 Bern	800 m

Nina Grigoryevna Otkalenko, née Pletnyova, (Russian: Нина Григорьевна Откаленко; 23 May 1928 – 13 May 2015) was a Soviet middle-distance runner. She won a European title in the 800 m at the inaugural 1954 European Athletics Championships and set multiple world records in this event in 1951–54. She missed the 1952 and 1956 Olympics, where women's middle-distance events were not part of the program, and the 1960 Olympics due to an injury.

In the 1950s Otkalenko became the most successful record breaker in the women's 800 m event. Starting with a world record of 2:12.0 minutes in 1951, she went on to improve her own 800 metres world record four more times. Spearheading a significant improvement in women's times in the event over her career, her last world record of 2:05.0 minutes in 1955 stood for almost five years, before it was beaten by her compatriot Lyudmila Shevtsova. She ranked number one in the world in the 800 m every year from 1951 to 1958, bar 1956 and 1957 when she ranked second to Lyudmila Lysenko and Yelizaveta Yermolayeva. She also set world records in the pre-IAAF era, with a 400 m record of 55.5 in 1954 and a 1500 m record of 4:37.0 minutes in 1952.

Outside of her European title, she won medals at the World Festival of Youth and Students, twice winning the 800 m title in 1953 and 1955, as well as taking 400 metres silver medals at both those championships. She was highly successful in domestic competition, ending her career with a total of 22 Soviet titles in track and field and cross country disciplines.

== International competitions ==
Year	Competition	Venue	Position	Event	Notes
1953	World Festival of Youth and Students	Bucharest, Romania	2nd	400 m	56.7
1953	World Festival of Youth and Students	Bucharest, Romania	1st	800 m	2:10.5
1954	European Championships	Bern, Switzerland	1st	800 m	2:08.8 CR
1955	World Festival of Youth and Students	Warsaw, Poland	2nd	400 m	55.5
1955	World Festival of Youth and Students	Warsaw, Poland	1st	800 m	2:09.4

Records
Preceded by Valentina Pomogayeva	Women's 800 metres world record holder 26 August 1951 – 3 July 1960	Succeeded by Lyudmila Shevtsova
