= Inga Gentzel =

Swedish runner

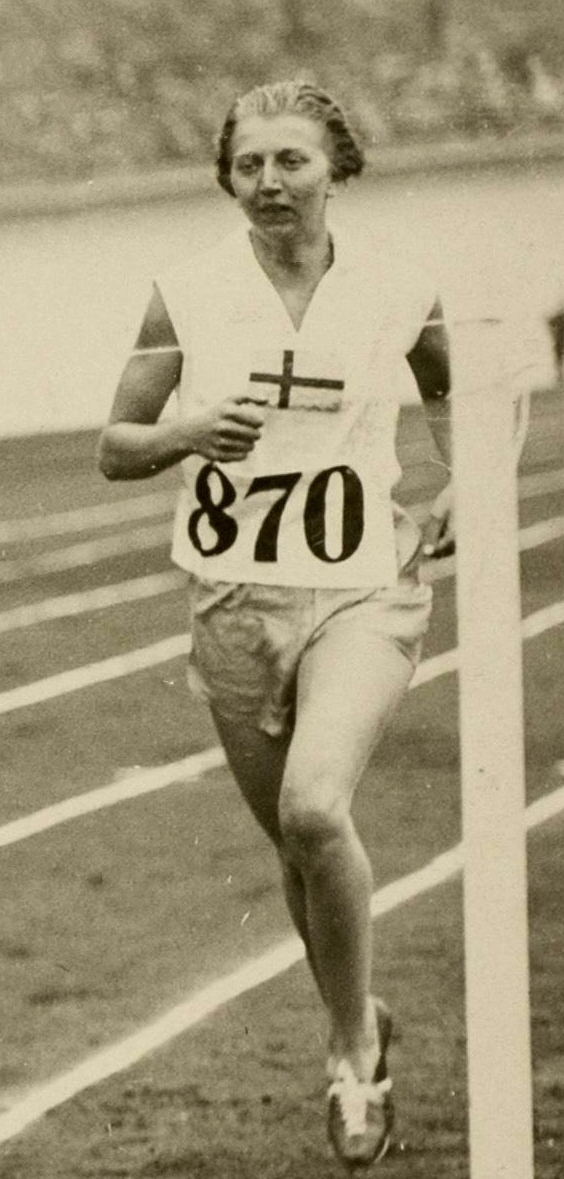
- Inga Gentzel at the 1928 Olympics

Personal information
- Nationality: Swedish
- Born: 24 April 1908 Stockholm, Sweden
- Died: 1 January 1991 (aged 82) Nyköping, Sweden

Sport
- Country: Sweden
- Sport: Athletics
- Event: 100–1000 m
- Club: Djurgårdens IF, Stockholm

Achievements and titles
- Personal best(s): 200 m – 27.8 (1929); 800 m – 2:18.8e (1928)
Medal record
Representing Sweden
Olympic Games
Bronze medal – third place	1928 Amsterdam	800 m
Women's World Games
Silver medal – second place	1926 Gothenburg	1000 m

Inga Kristina Gentzel (later Dahlgren, 24 April 1908 – 1 January 1991) was a Swedish runner who won a bronze medal in the 800 m at the 1928 Summer Olympics. Shortly before the Olympics, she set a new world record in this event, broken two weeks later, but remained a national record until 1943. Gentzel won the silver medal in the 1000 m at the 1926 Women's World Games.

Gentzel represented Djurgårdens IF. She held Swedish titles in the 200 m in 1929 and the 800 m in 1928–31.

She worked as a piano teacher in Nyköping and often appeared on the Swedish radio as a member of the vocal group Trio Rita, together with Ulla Castegren and Anna-Lisa Cronström. She was a niece of the actor Ludde Gentzel.

Records
Preceded by (Germany) Lina Radke	Women's 800 metres World Record Holder; 1928-06-16 – 1928-08-07	Succeeded by (Germany) Lina Radke
