= Mariatorget metro station =

Stockholm Metro station

Mariatorget
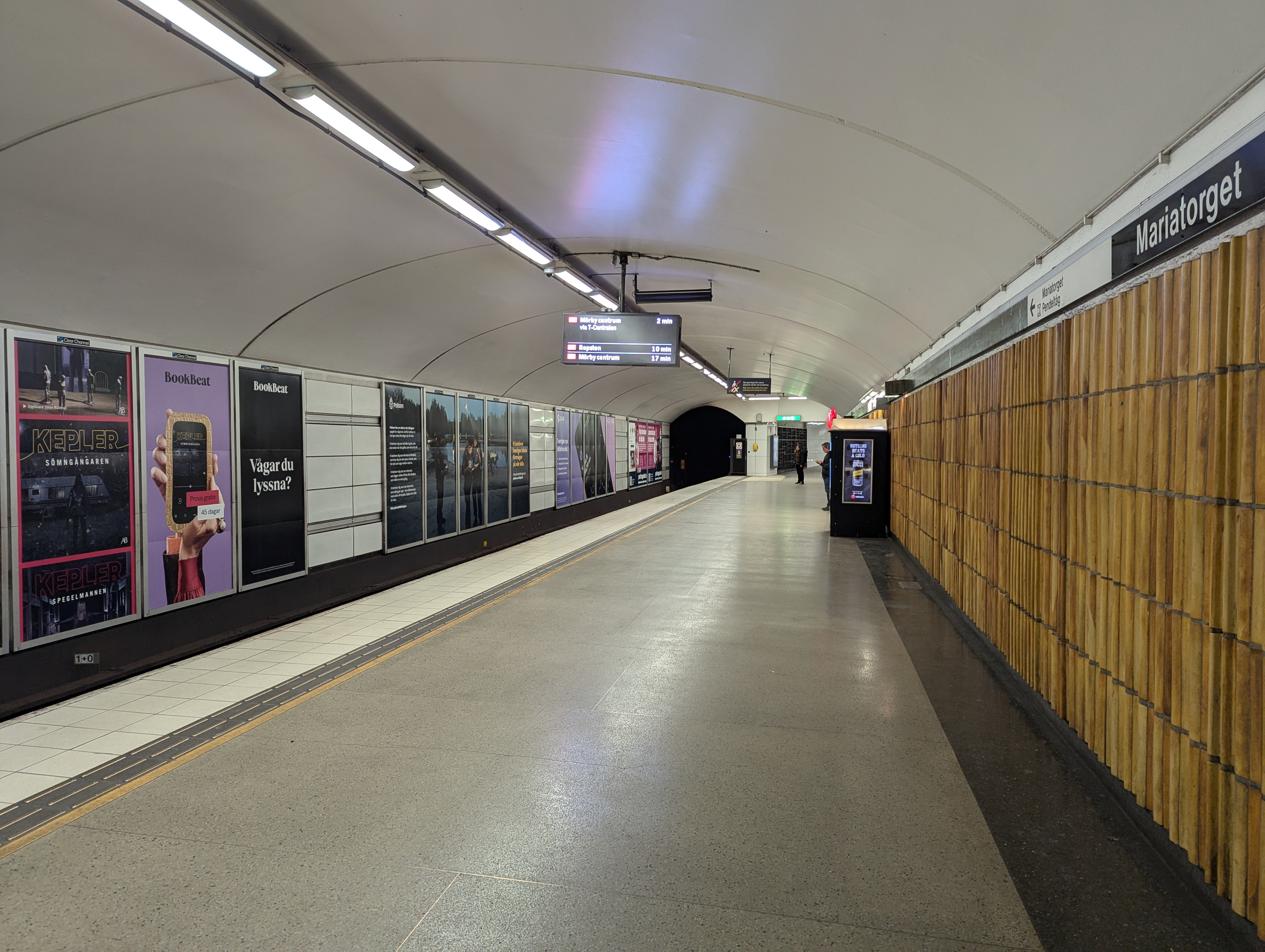
- Northbound platform

General information
- Location: Södermalm, Stockholm
- Coordinates: 59°19′00″N 18°03′47″E
- Elevation: 1.5 m (4.9 ft) above sea level
- System: Stockholm Metro station
- Owner: Storstockholms Lokaltrafik
- Platforms: 2 side platforms
- Tracks: 2

Construction
- Structure type: Underground
- Depth: 20 m (66 ft)
- Accessible: Yes

Other information
- Station code: MRT

History
- Opened: 5 April 1964; 62 years ago

Passengers
- 2019: 17,100 boarding per weekday

Services
Preceding station	Stockholm Metro	Following station
Zinkensdamm towards Norsborg	Line 13	Slussen towards Ropsten
Zinkensdamm towards Fruängen	Line 14	Slussen towards Mörby centrum
Location
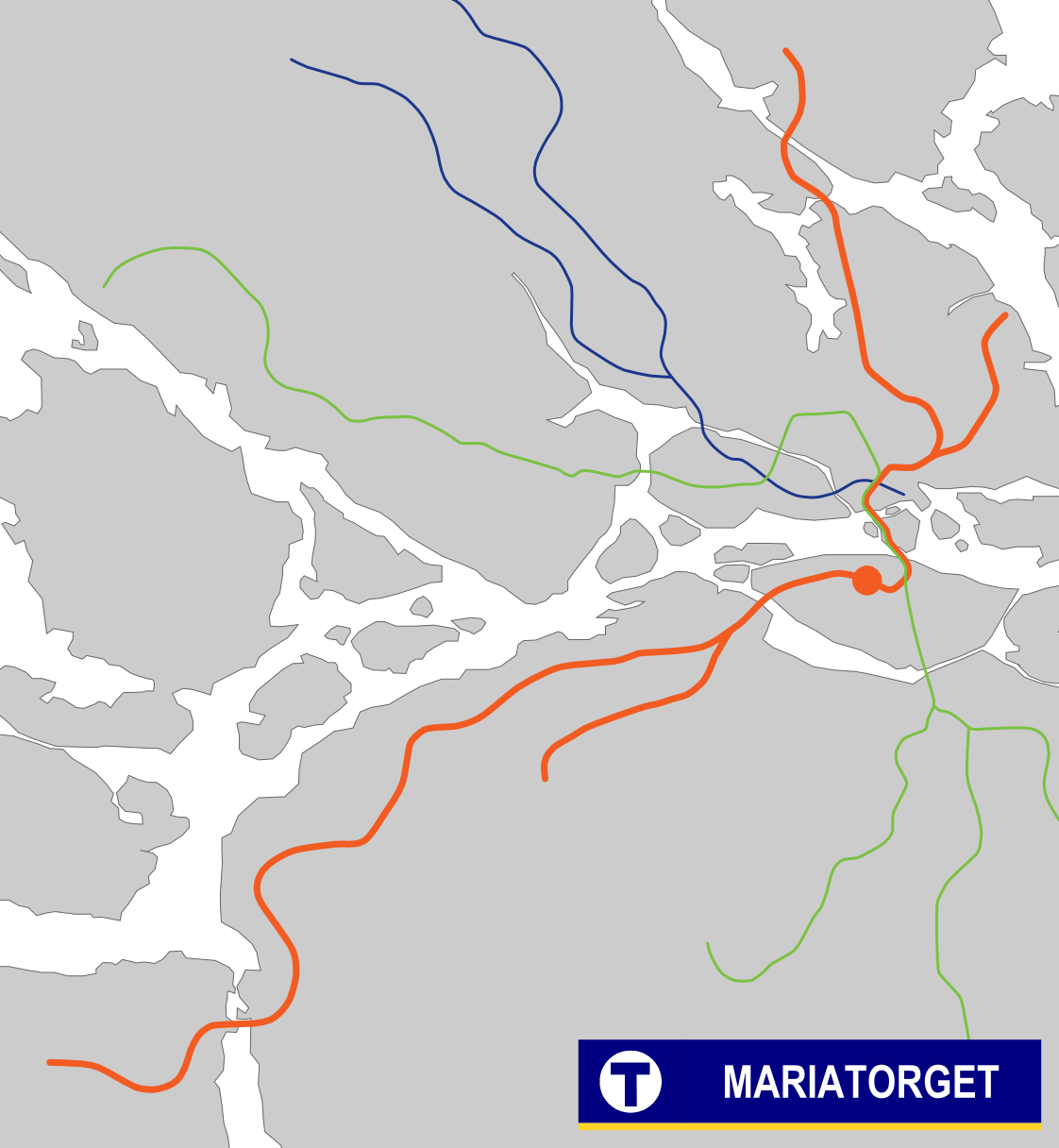

Mariatorget is a station on the Red Line of the Stockholm Metro, located on the island of Södermalm in Stockholm City, Sweden. It was opened on 5 April 1964 as part of the first section of the Red line, running between T-Centralen and Fruängen. The station takes its name from the nearby Mariatorget square.

The station is 20 m (66 ft) below ground and has two tracks, each in a separate tunnel and served by a side platform. The two platforms are situated between the tracks in a back-to-back configuration and connected together by cross tunnels, thus functioning like a single island platform.

The station has two booking halls and barrier lines, one at each end of the station. The western booking hall is situated at street level, with access from the east side of Torkel Knutssonsgatan and access to the platform by escalator and lift.

The eastern booking hall is situated below street level, and has an entrance on the north-eastern corner of Swedenborgsgatan and Wollmar Yxkullsgatan. Access between street and booking hall is by stairs and lift, whilst access to the platforms is by escalator and lift. Södra station, on the Stockholm commuter rail system, is about five minutes walk from this entrance via Swedenborgsgatan.

The metro station features decoration by ceramicist Karin Björquist and architect Kjell Abramson, with walls clad in yellow-brown ceramic rods made at Gustavsberg. At the western entrance is the bronze sculpture Man and Pillar by Asmund Arle and at the exit there are wrought iron gates designed by Britt-Louise Sundell.

== Gallery ==
Entrance at Swedenborgsgatan

Subsurface booking hall

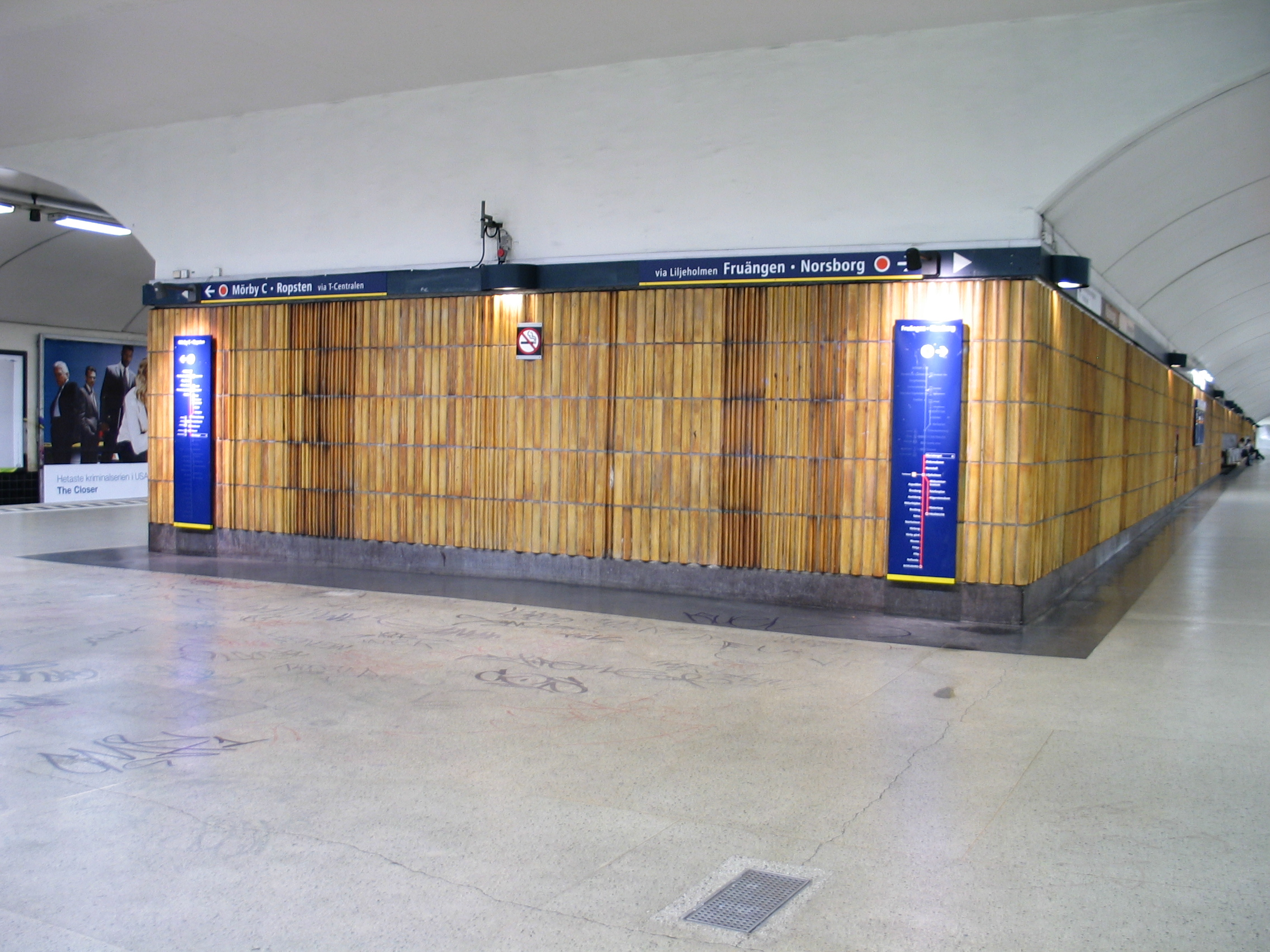
Ceramic wall covering in cross passage

Wrought iron gates
