= Zinkensdamm =

Area of Stockholm, Sweden

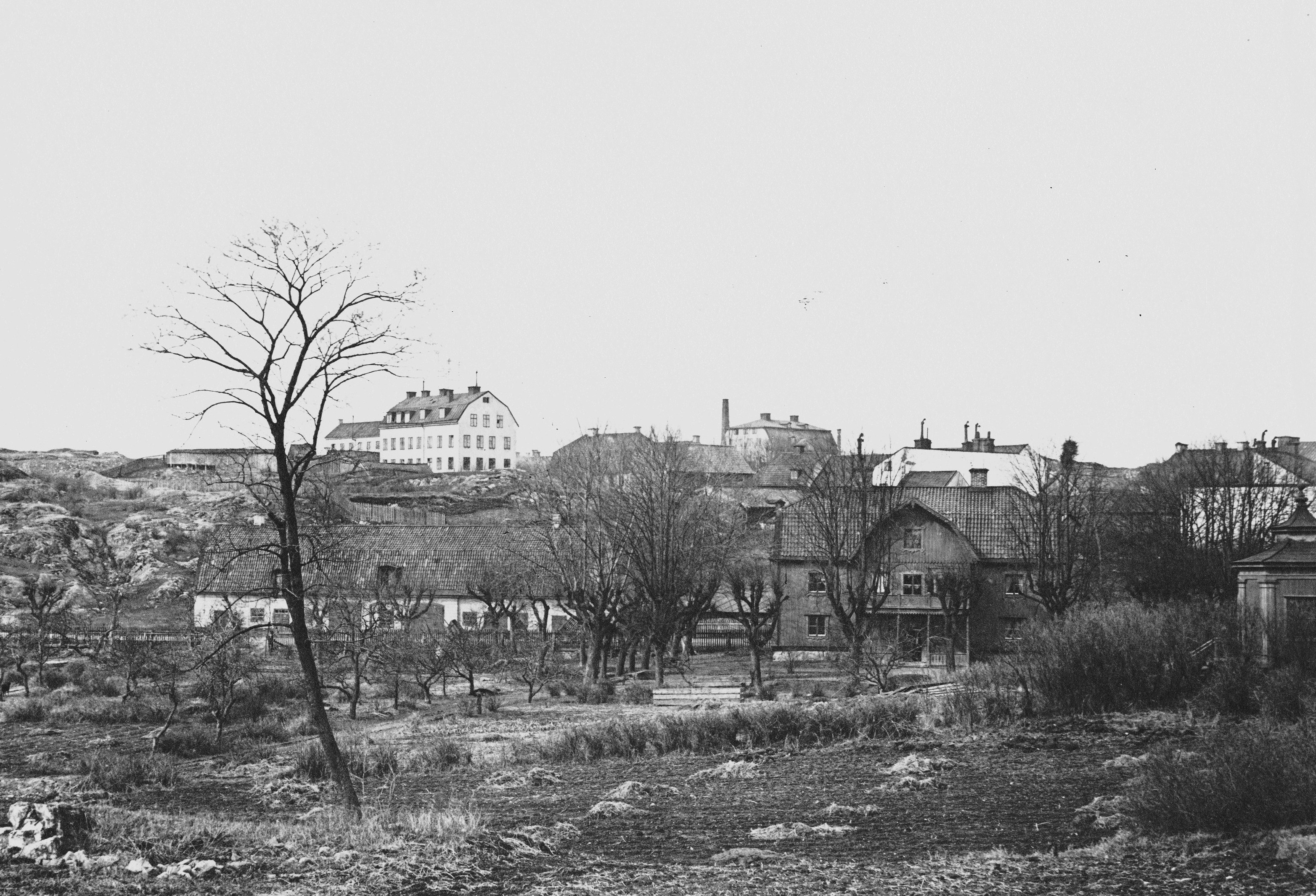
The only remaining photograph of the Zinkensdamm manor, taken in 1890

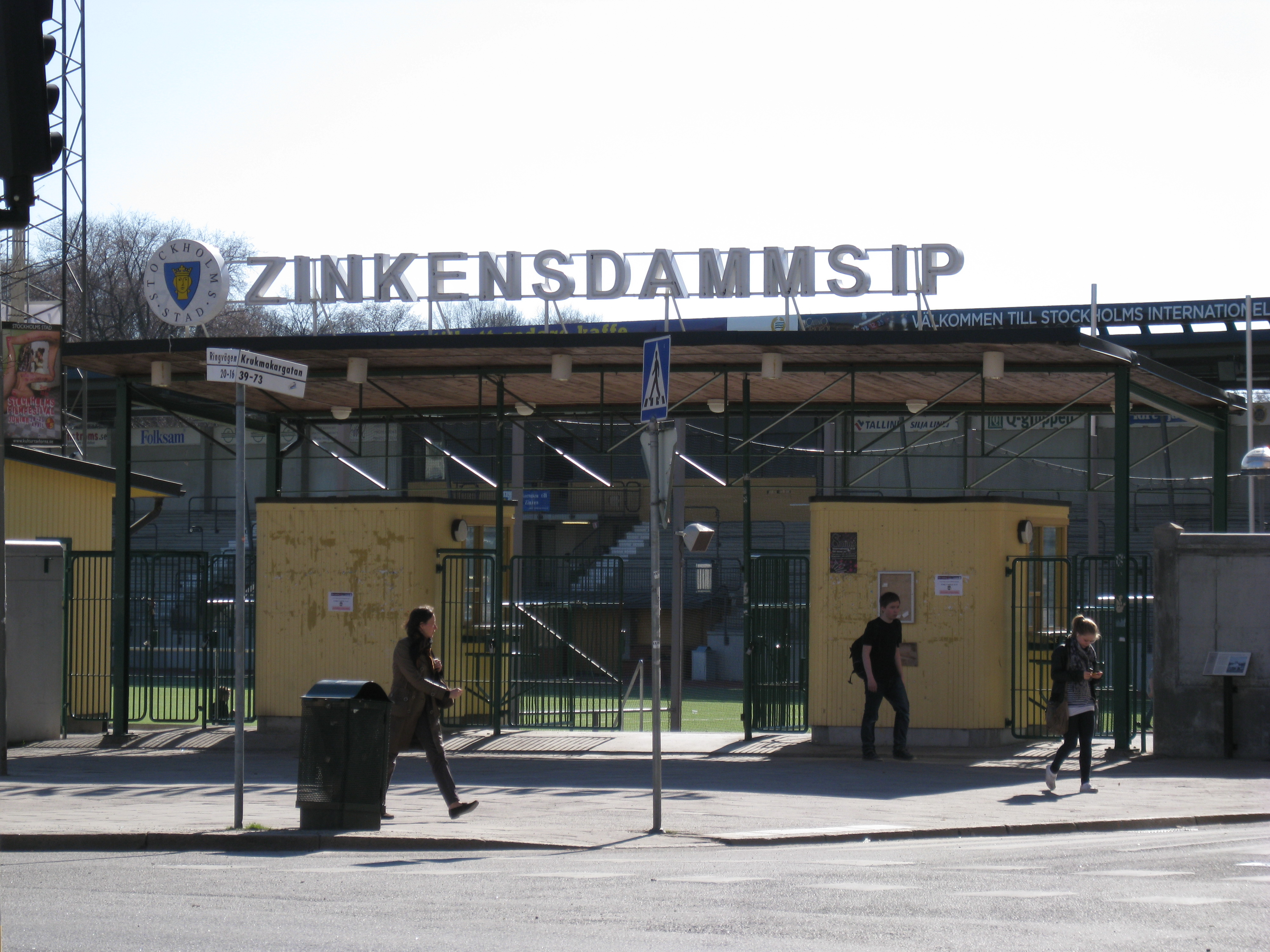
The sports ground Zinkensdamms IP

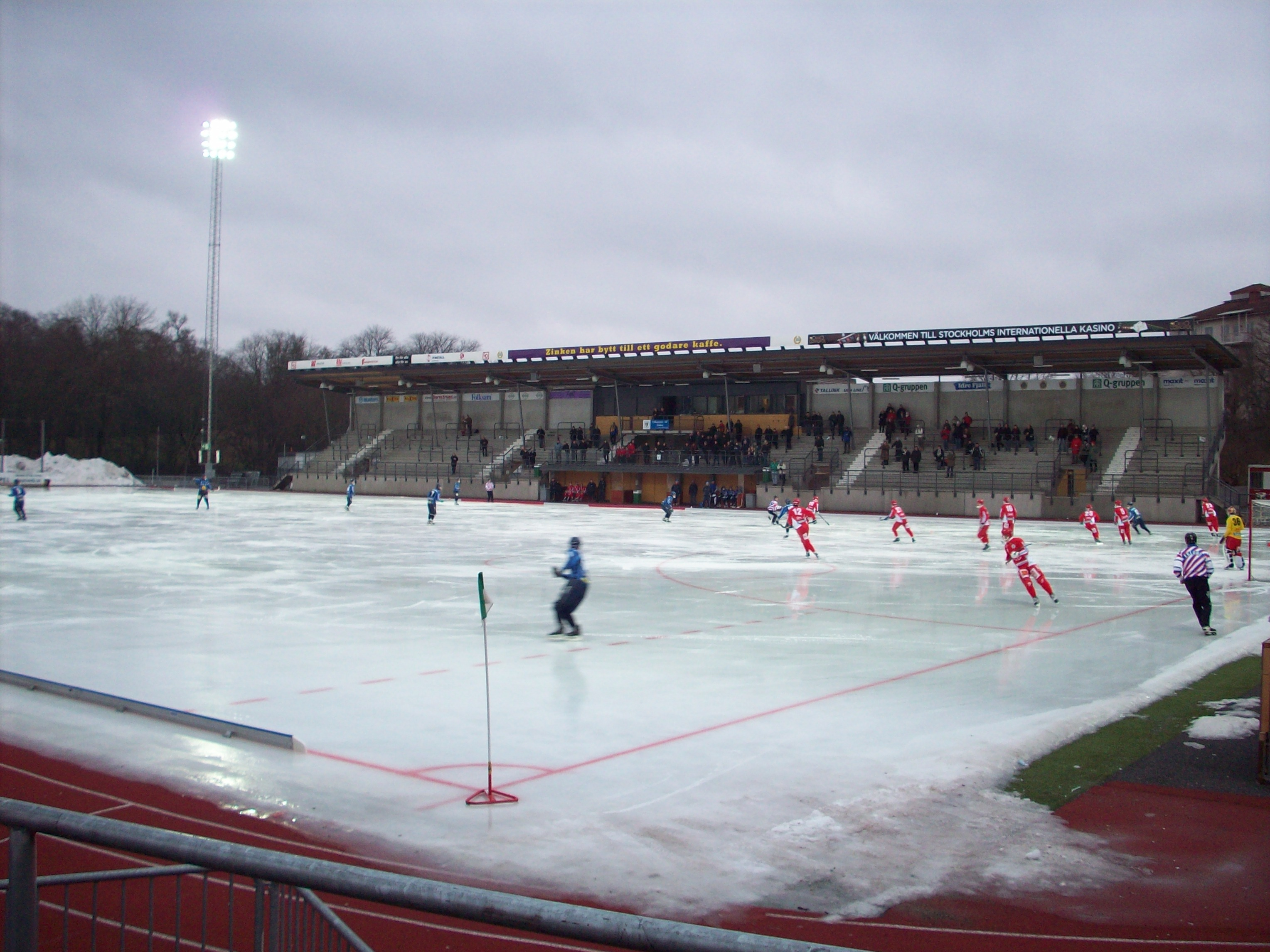
A game of bandy at Zinkensdamms IP, home ice of the 2010 Swedish champions Hammarby

Zinkensdamm is an area and a former manor in Södermalm in the Stockholm City Centre just east of Hornstull. The area was named after Frantz Zinck, who lived on the property for five years in the 1600s, though he never formally owned it. The Zinkensdamm manor was demolished in 1934. The name is today used for Zinkensdamm metro station, the sports ground Zinkensdamms IP, and Zinkens Growers' Association, which owns some 30 gardening allotments. The small statistical geographical area (basområde) Zinkensdamm had 2165 residents in 2005.

== History ==
Wealthy customs manager Wilhelm Böös Drakenhielm, who was active in the mid 17th century, placed his wealth in agricultural real estate. He bought a large property in this area in 1668. The area was mountainous and not suitable to be built upon, and Drakenhielm probably bought the land to have some carp ponds, which was considered "a must" for a wealthy person of that time.

After Drakenhielm's finances deteriorated, royal councillor Claes Fleming (1649–1685) took over. Following his death in 1685, in the same year, his widow Anna Cruus sold the property to the merchant Frantz Zinck, who was a large supplier of textiles to the Swedish crown, for a sum of 36,000 Swedish riksdaler (copper). However, Zinck had problems in paying the full amount, and therefore did not hold the title to the property when he died in 1690. Despite this, the area still carries his name.

== Sports ==
Zinkensdamms IP has hosted matches in the Bandy World Championship several times. In 2006 it was the main arena where the final was played. It is the home ground for bandy club Hammarby IF.
