= 1954 European Athletics Championships – Women's 800 metres =

Women's 800 metres at the European Athletics Championships
- Venue: Stadion Neufeld
- Location: Bern, Switzerland
- Dates: 25 August 1954 (heats); 27 August 1954 (final)
- Competitors: 19 from 11 nations
- Winning time: 2:08.8 CR

Medalists
gold medal	Nina Otkalenko	Soviet Union
silver medal	Diane Leather	Great Britain
bronze medal	Lyudmila Lysenko	Soviet Union

The women's 800 metres at the 1954 European Athletics Championships was held over two rounds at Stadion Neufeld in Bern, Switzerland, on 25 and 27 August 1954.

== Results ==
=== Heats ===
The three preliminary heats were held on 25 August.

Results of heat 1
Rank	Name	Nation	Time	Notes
1	Nina Otkalenko	Soviet Union	2:09.9	Q
2	Anne Oliver	Great Britain	2:11.8	Q
3	Bedřiška Müllerová	Czechoslovakia	2:11.8	NR Q
4	Ágnes Oros	Hungary	2:11.8	
5	Inga Nyqvist	Finland	2:17.2	

Results of heat 2
Rank	Name	Nation	Time	Notes
1	Aranka Kazi	Hungary	2:11.8	Q
2	Bożena Pestka	Poland	2:12.0	NR Q
3	Valerie Winn	Great Britain	2:12.4	Q
4	Nina Cernoscek	Soviet Union	2:12.7	
5	Marianne Weiss	West Germany	2:15.6	NR
6	Odile Monguillon	France	2:17.3	
7	Maria Kessels	Belgium	2:33.7	

Results of heat 3
Rank	Name	Nation	Time	Notes
1	Lyudmila Lysenko	Soviet Union	2:08.8	CR Q
2	Diane Leather	Great Britain	2:08.9	Q
3	Anna Bácskai	Hungary	2:12.5	Q
4	Claude Laurent	France	2:14.7	
5	Loredana Simonetti	Italy	2:16.5	NR
6	Isolde Beichler	West Germany	2:17.6	
7	Ludmila Dunst	Austria	2:24.7	

=== Final ===
The final was held on 27 August.

Results of the final
Rank	Name	Nation	Time	Notes
1st place, gold medalist(s)	Nina Otkalenko	Soviet Union	2:08.8	CR
2nd place, silver medalist(s)	Diane Leather	Great Britain	2:09.8	
3rd place, bronze medalist(s)	Lyudmila Lysenko	Soviet Union	2:11.2	
4	Aranka Kazi	Hungary	2:11.9	
5	Bożena Pestka	Poland	2:12.6	
6	Valerie Winn	Great Britain	2:13.3	
7	Anne Oliver	Great Britain	2:13.3	
8	Bedřiška Müllerová	Czechoslovakia	2:13.6	
9	Anna Bácskai	Hungary	2:14.6	
