= Lyudmila Shevtsova =

Soviet middle-distance runner (1934–2026)

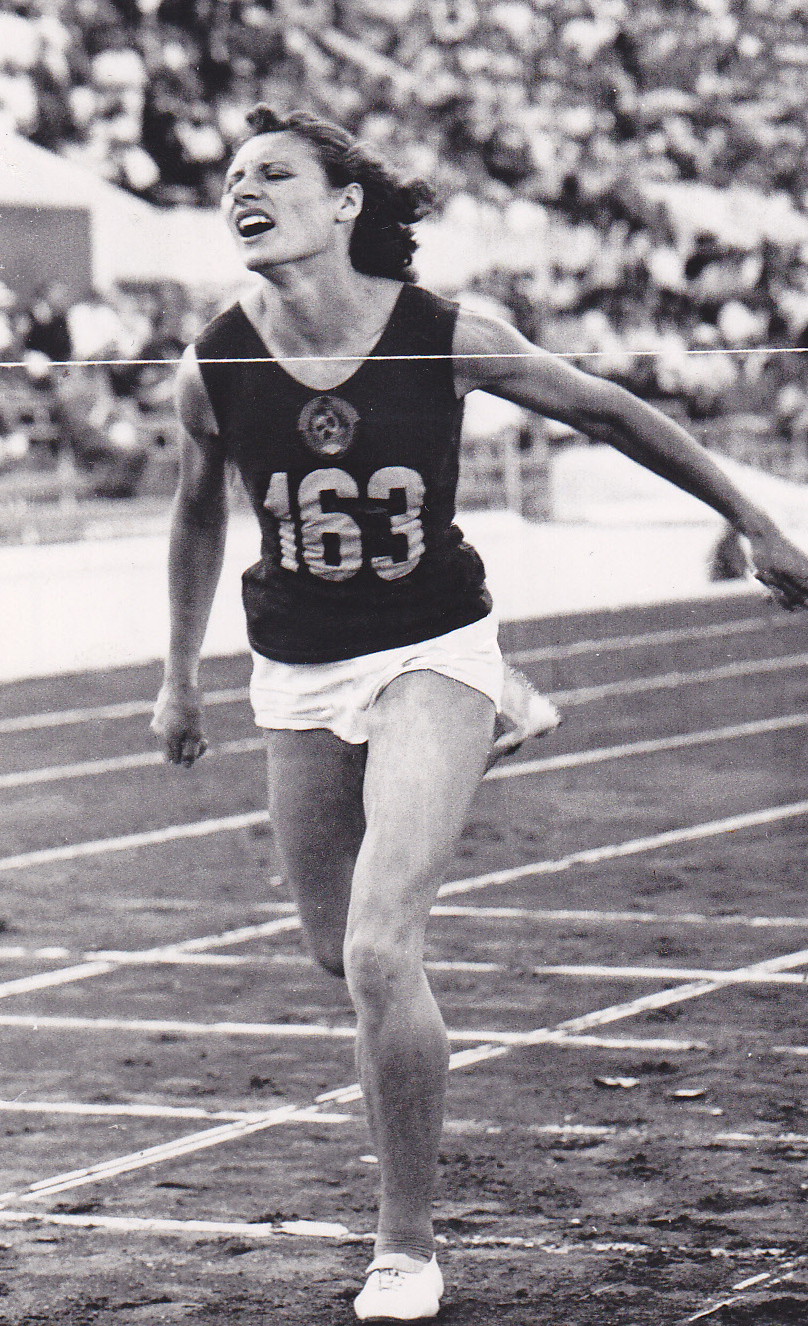
- Shevtsova at the 1960 Olympics

Personal information
- Native name: Людмила Шевцова
- Nationality: Russian-Ukrainian
- Born: 26 November 1934 Taman, Temryuksky District, Azov-Black Sea Krai, Russian SFSR, Soviet Union
- Died: 13 April 2026 (aged 91)
- Height: 164 cm (5 ft 5 in)
- Weight: 53 kg (117 lb)

Sport
- Country: Soviet Union
- Sport: Middle-distance running
- Club: Avanhard, Dnipropetrovsk
Medal record
Women's athletics
Representing Soviet Union
Olympic Games
Gold medal – first place	1960 Rome	800 m
European Championships
Bronze medal – third place	1954 Bern	800 m

Lyudmila Ivanovna Gurevitch (née Shevtsova, later Lysenko; (Note: Russian: Людмила Ивановна Лысенко (Шевцова, Гуревич); Ukrainian: Людмила Іванівна Лисенко (Шевцова, Гуревич)) 26 November 1934 – 13 April 2026) was a Russian-Ukrainian athlete who competed mainly in the 800 metres. On 3 July 1960, she set a world record in this event at 2 minutes 4.3 seconds. She equaled this time while winning the 800 m gold at the 1960 Olympics two months later. Two Australians, Brenda Jones and Dixie Willis led the race. With 50–70 m left, Willis stepped on the curb and dropped out of competition, while Shevtsova gradually reached Jones and won in the last meters.

In 1954, Shevtsova finished second in the 800 m at the nationals and third at the European Championships. At the 1962 European Championships, she failed to reach the final. During her career, she won nine national titles: in the 400 m in 1955; in the 800 m in 1955–1956, 1959, and 1961–1962; and in the cross-country in 1960–1962 and 1964. After retiring from competitions she coached athletics in Kyiv. She was awarded the Order of the Red Banner of Labour in 1960.

Shevtsova first trained in artistic gymnastics, and changed to running only in 1951, after unexpectedly winning a cross-country race at the Dnipropetrovsk championships. She married twice and thus changed her last name to Lysenko and then to Gurevich. She has two sons from different marriages, Oleg (born 1957), and Vladimir. She lived in Kyiv with her second husband, an athletics coach.

Shevtsova died on 13 April 2026, at the age of 91.

== Notes ==
Records
Preceded by (Soviet Union) Nina Otkalenko	Women's 800 metres World Record Holder; 1960-07-03 – 1962-03-03	Succeeded by (Australia) Dixie Willis
