= Lina Radke =

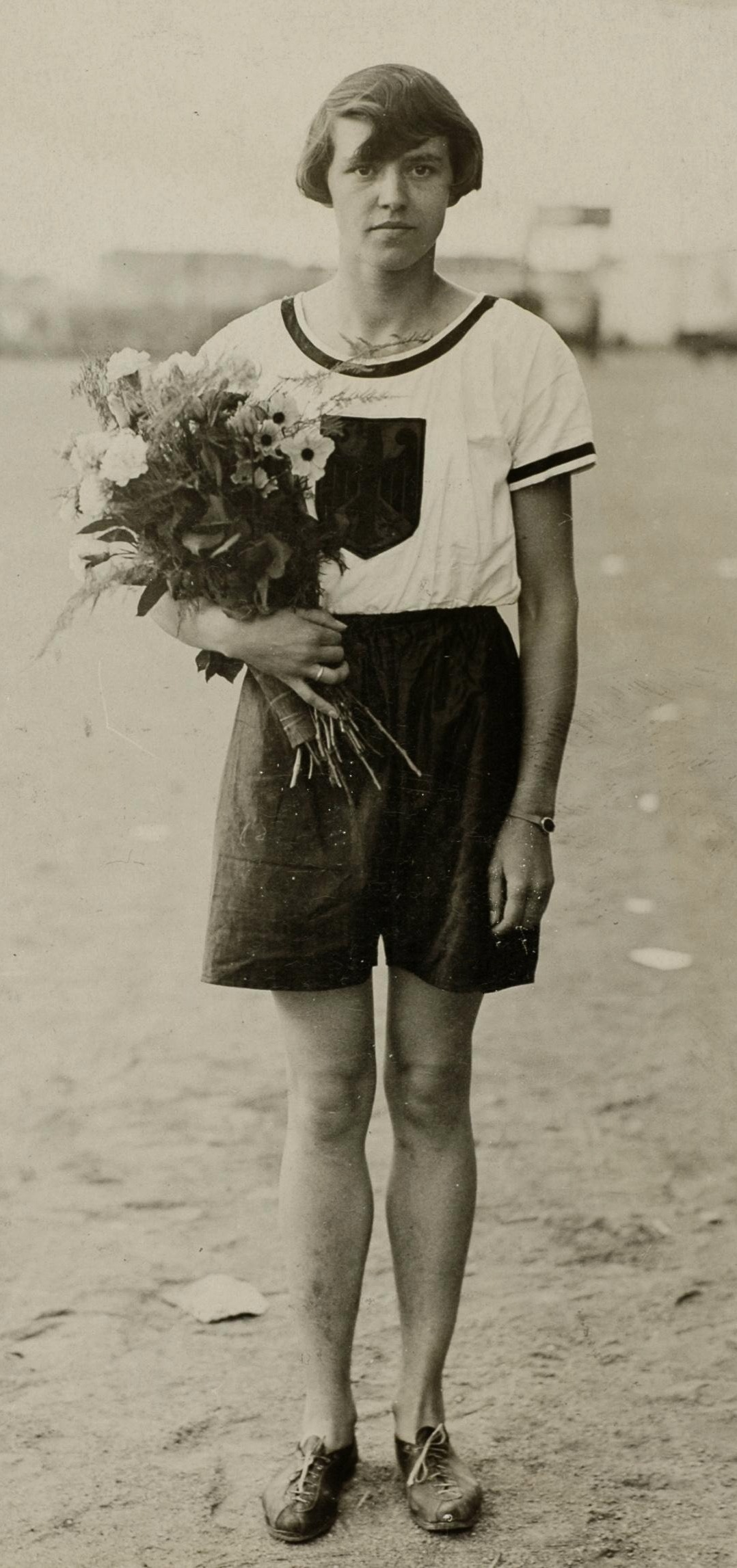
- Lina Radke at the 1928 Summer Olympics

Personal information
- Born: 18 October 1903 Karlsruhe, German Empire
- Died: 14 February 1983 (aged 79) Karlsruhe, West Germany
- Height: 1.69 m (5 ft 7 in)
- Weight: 55 kg (121 lb)

Sport
- Sport: Running
- Club: SC Baden-Baden; VfB Breslau
Medal record
Representing Germany
Olympic Games
Gold medal – first place	1928 Amsterdam	800 metres

Karoline "Lina" Radke-Batschauer (née Batschauer; 18 October 1903 – 14 February 1983) was a German track and field athlete. She was the first Olympic champion in the 800 m for women.

She started competing in athletics at the age of 20. In those years sports such as running were considered far too exhausting for women. This vision was shared by many, including the originator of the modern Olympic movement, Pierre de Coubertin.

In 1927, she married Georg Radke, who was her coach and a manager of her club SC Baden-Baden. The couple moved to Georg's hometown of Breslau (now Wrocław in Poland), where in 1927 she set her first 800 m world record. Together with her husband, Lina Radke was one of the pioneers of female athletics in the mid-1920s. Competitions for women were not held frequently, but Radke nevertheless won several regional and national titles. She first specialised in the 1000 m, but when this was changed into the 800 m (because that distance would be held at the upcoming 1928 Summer Olympics), she switched to that event. The highlight of Radke's career were those 1928 Summer Olympics, as she won the inaugural title in the 800 m, earning the first German gold medal in athletics. Along the way, she set the first officially recognised world record in that event, 2:16.8, which would last until 1944. Following false media reports of competitors collapsing after the race, however, the IOC banished the women's 800 m from the Games; it would not be included again until 1960.

In 1930 Radke set a 1000 m world record. She retired in 1934, after finishing fourth in the 800 m at the last Women's World Games. After that she worked as athletics coach in Breslau and Torgau. Her husband took part in World War II and was held as a prisoner of war in the Soviet Union. Upon his release in 1950, the family moved to Karlsruhe.

Records
Preceded by (United Kingdom) Mary Lines	Women's 800 metres World Record Holder; 1927-08-07 – 1928-06-16	Succeeded by (Sweden) Inga Gentzel
Preceded by (Sweden) Inga Gentzel	Women's 800 metres World Record Holder; 1928-07-01 – 1944-08-28	Succeeded by (Sweden) Anna Larsson
