= Hornstull metro station =

Stockholm Metro station

Hornstull
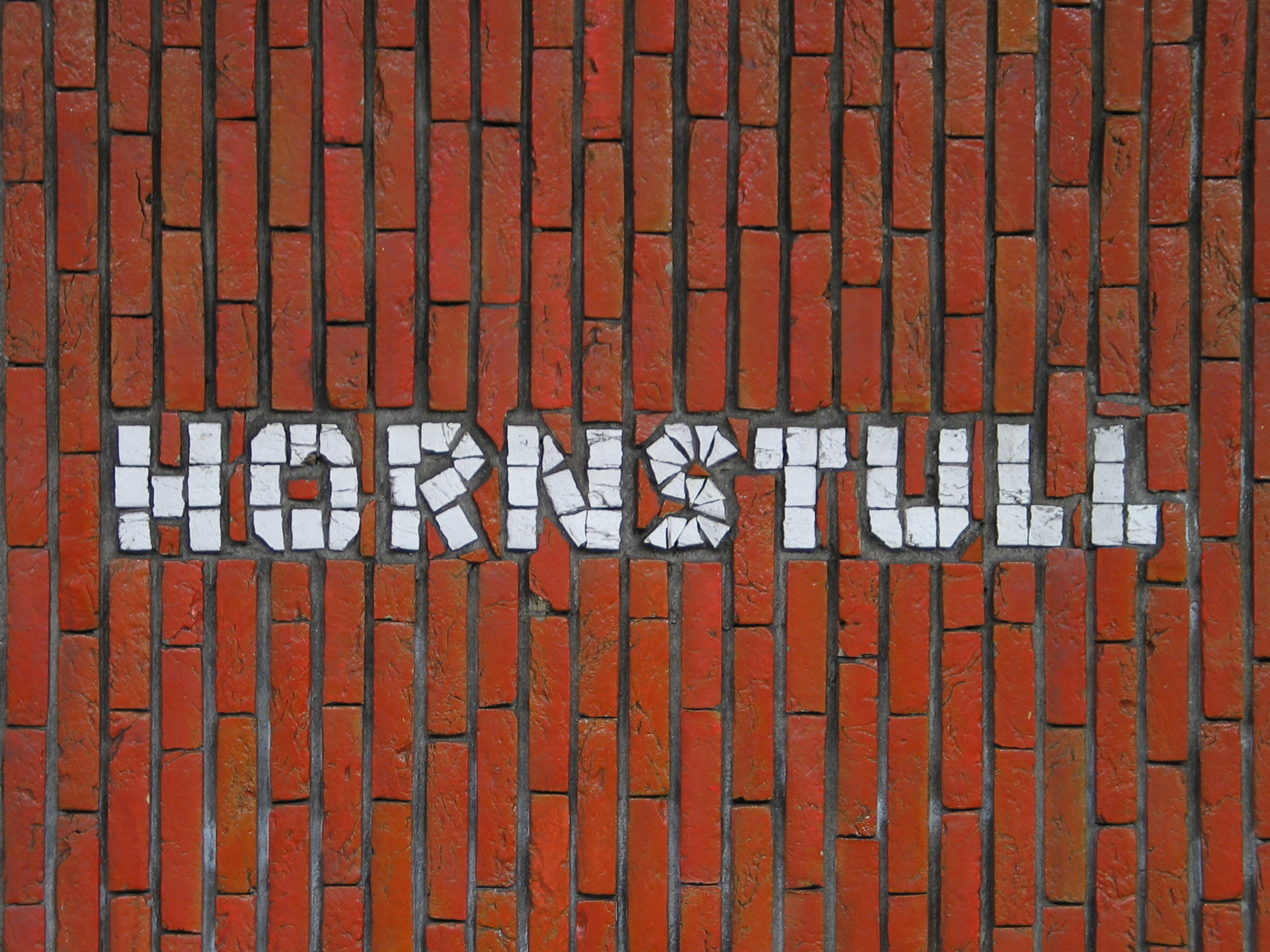

General information
- Coordinates: 59°18′56″N 18°02′02″E
- Elevation: 0.9 m (3.0 ft) above sea level
- System: Stockholm Metro station
- Owner: Storstockholms Lokaltrafik
- Platforms: 2 side platforms
- Tracks: 2

Construction
- Structure type: Underground
- Depth: 13–18 m (43–59 ft)
- Accessible: Yes

Other information
- Station code: HOT

History
- Opened: 5 April 1964; 62 years ago

Passengers
- 2019: 18,500 boarding per weekday

Services
Preceding station	Stockholm Metro	Following station
Liljeholmen towards Norsborg	Line 13	Zinkensdamm towards Ropsten
Liljeholmen towards Fruängen	Line 14	Zinkensdamm towards Mörby centrum
Location
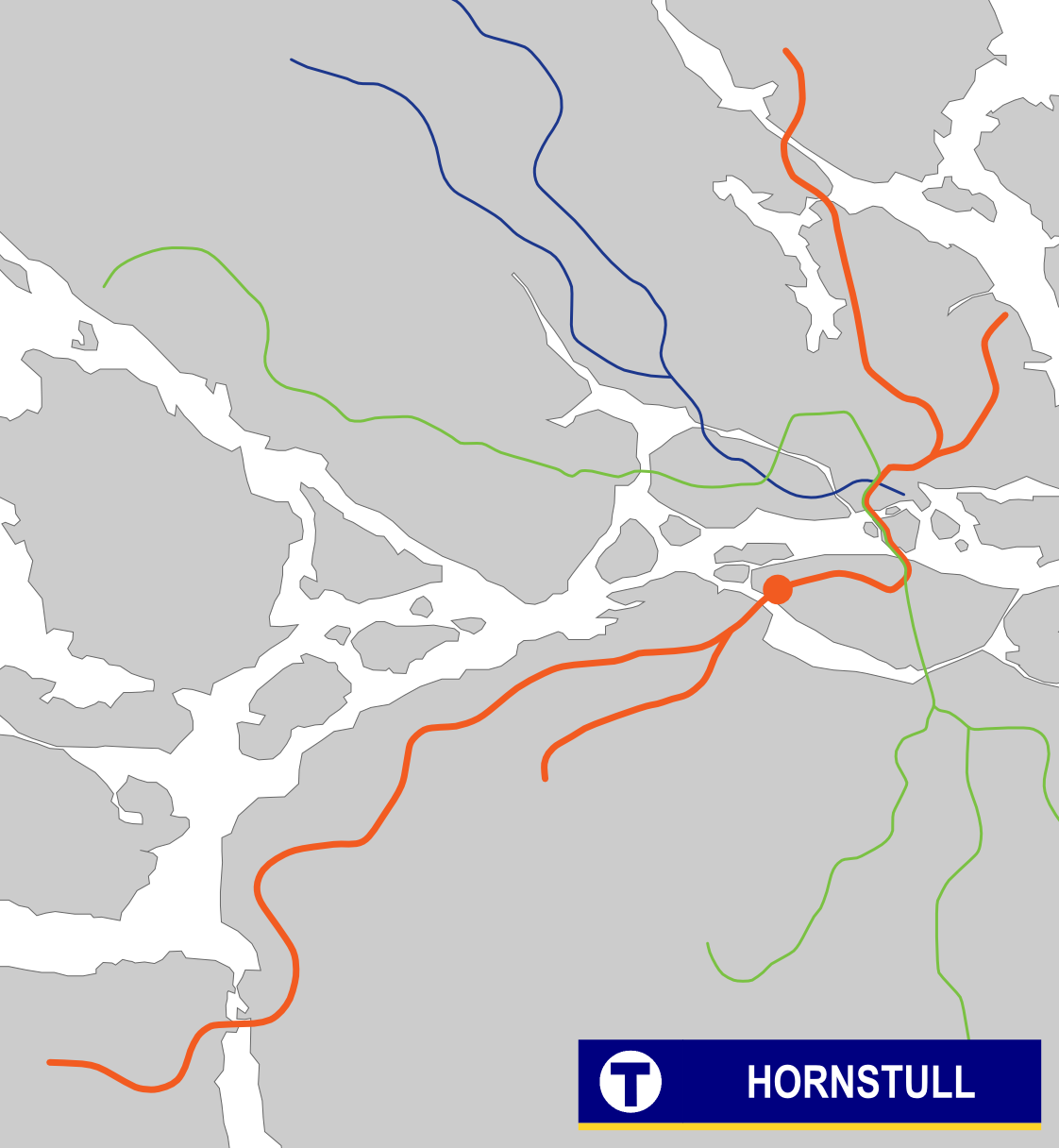

Hornstull is a station on the Red Line of the Stockholm Metro, located on the island of Södermalm in Stockholm City, Sweden. The station station takes its name from Hornstull, the intersection where the streets Hornsgatan and Långholmsgatan meet. It was opened on 5 April 1964 as part of the first section of the Red line, between T-Centralen and Fruängen.

The station is between 13 m (43 ft) and 18 m (59 ft) below ground and has two tracks, each in a separate tunnel and served by a side platform. The two platforms are situated between the tracks in a back-to-back configuration and connected together by cross tunnels, thus functioning like a single island platform.

The station has two booking halls and barrier lines, one at each end of the station. The eastern booking hall is situated at street level, with access to the north side of Hornsbruksgatan. Access to the platform is then by stairs and escalator, but no lift.

The western booking hall is situated below street level, and has three entrances from near the Hornstull intersection, and from the Bulten 19 shopping centre, with each entrance having stairs and a lift to the ticket hall level. Access to the platform is then by stairs, escalator and lift.

The metro station features decoration by Berndt Helleberg made between 1964 and 1992. The original composition was on the theme of the Cave of Altamira in Spain and is executed in Dutch red, hand-beaten and glazed brick with inserted black bands and white figures. Subsequent additions by the same artist include ceiling art, wrought-iron work and display cases on the themes of sky, sea, earth and desert.

The entrance at the Hornstull end of the station was renovated in 2012 as part of the development of the shopping centre. As part of this an elaborately scultured column entitled Cast in memory, by Eva Ziggy Berglund, was installed.

== Gallery ==
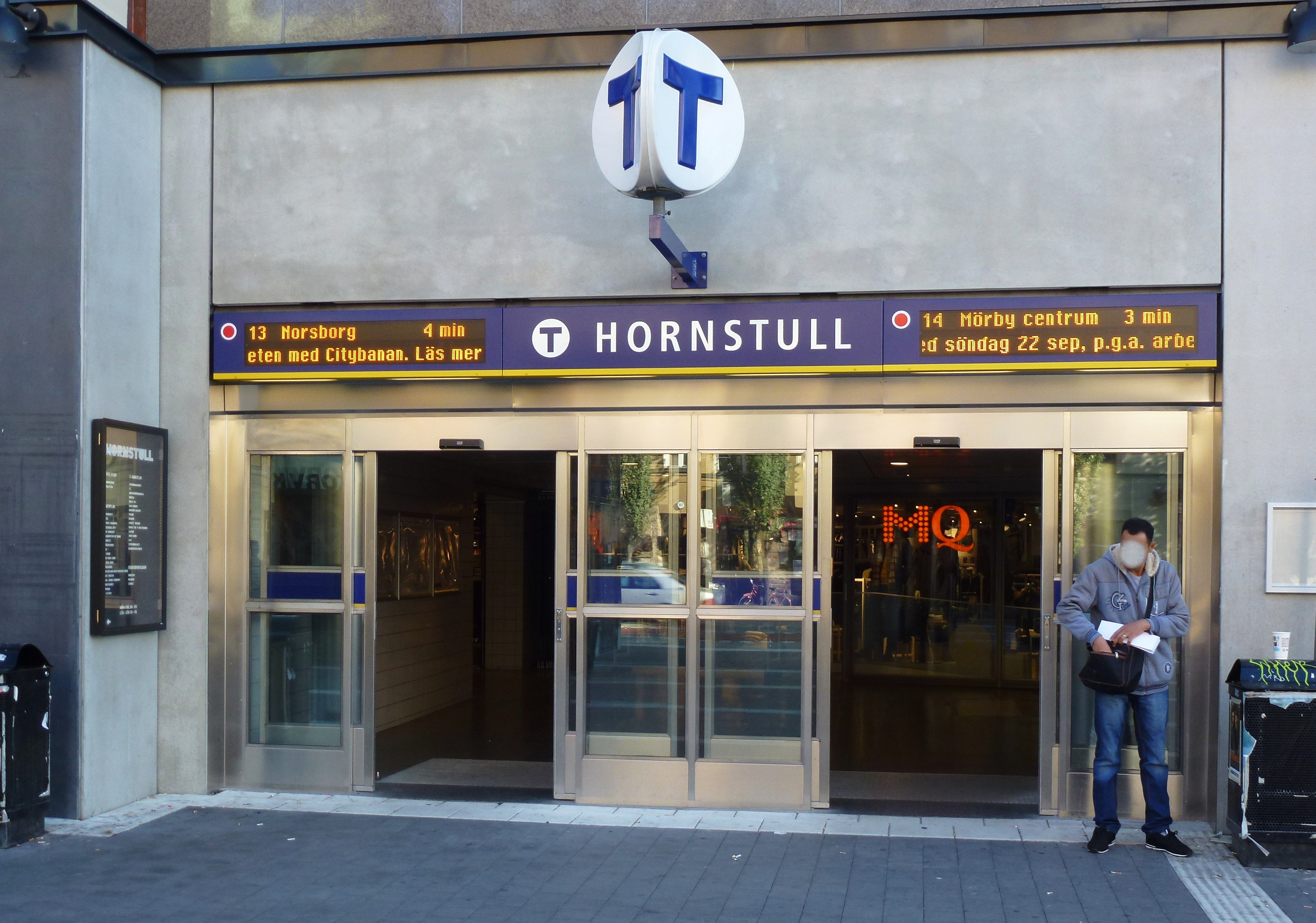
Entrance by Bulten 19

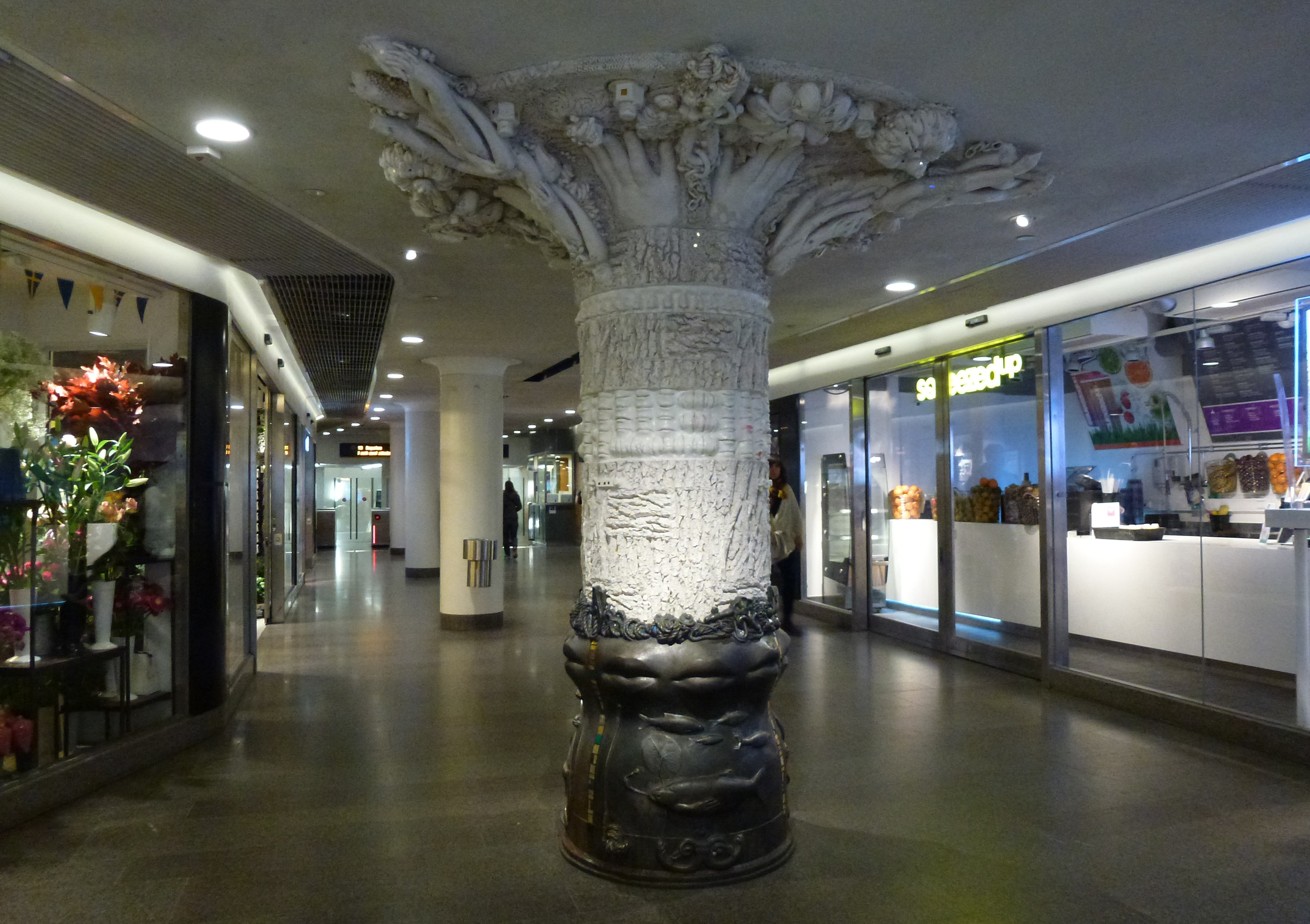
Subsurface corridor with Cast in Memory

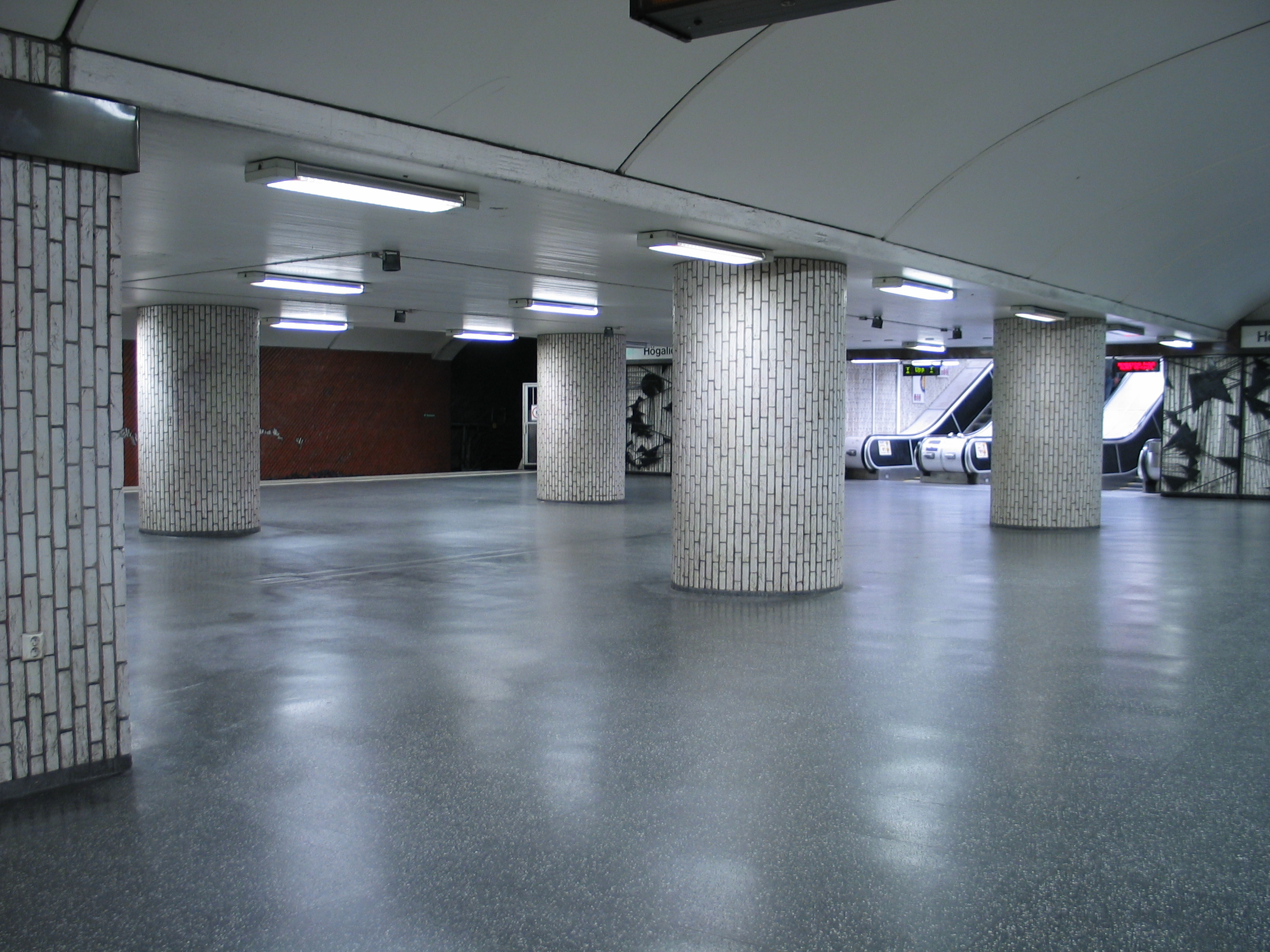
Cross-passage at platform level

Platform with Altamira art work
