= Walter Dohm =

American track and field athlete

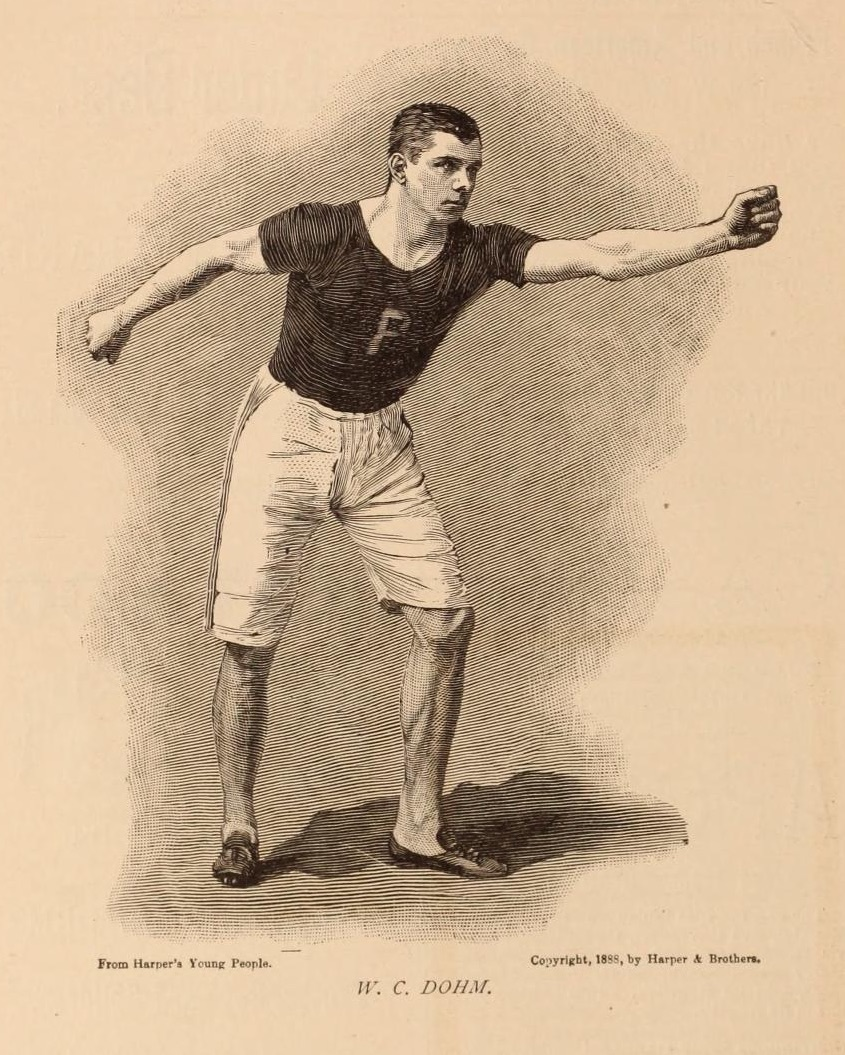
- Dohm in 1888
- Born: Walter Charles Dohm; March 27, 1869; Princeton, New Jersey, U.S.
- Died: May 9, 1894 (aged 25); Denver, Colorado, U.S.
- Occupations: track and field athlete

Walter Charles Dohm (March 27, 1869 – May 9, 1894) was an American track and field athlete. Dohm won national and intercollegiate championship titles at both 440 yards and 880 yards and set a world record at the latter distance in 1891.

== Biography ==
Dohm was born in Princeton, New Jersey, on March 27, 1869. He studied at Princeton University, initially playing football; after picking up running, he developed rapidly under the guidance of Princeton's coach Jim Robinson. Originally, he competed mostly at 440 yards, and sometimes at 220 yards; in 1888, he was national quarter-mile champion of both the United States and Canada.

In 1889, Dohm repeated as both American and Canadian quarter-mile champion and also won the intercollegiate (IC4A) championship at the distance. He also started to move up to the half-mile, breaking Lon Myers's American record of 1:55 2/5 with his time of 1:55 1/4. One of his leading rivals was William Downs of Harvard, who won the 1889 intercollegiate title at 880 yards; in 1890 they met at the middle-ground distance of 600 yards, with Downs winning. Subsequently, they switched distances, with Downs becoming primarily a quarter-miler and Dohm a half-miler; at the 1890 IC4A championships each of them won at their new distance, with Dohm's half-mile time of 1:57 1/2 being a new meeting record. Dohm also won the long jump championship.

Dohm graduated from Princeton after the 1890 season and became a reporter, but continued to race, winning the 880 yards at the 1891 AAU championships. On September 19, 1891, he broke Francis Cross's world record for 880 yards, running 1:54 1/2 in a handicap race in New York City; there was some confusion in the United States about what the old record by Cross (an Englishman) had been, with the media reporting Dohm had set a new American record but only equaled or narrowly missed the world best. Cross's actual time had been 1:54 3/5, a tenth of a second slower than Dohm's.

In 1892, Dohm started to suffer from pulmonary problems, which forced him to retire from running. As his condition worsened, he moved to Denver, Colorado, in the hope his health would improve there, but the move failed to help, and he died from tuberculosis in Denver on May 9, 1894. Many contemporary commentators believed he had damaged his lungs by training too hard and exerting himself too much, and that this had caused or contributed to his condition. Dohm's world record lasted until September 1895, when Charles Kilpatrick broke it.

Records
Preceded by (United Kingdom) Francis Cross	Men's 880y World Record Holder; September 19, 1891 – September 21, 1895	Succeeded by (United States) Charles Kilpatrick
