= Charles Kilpatrick (athlete) =

American distance runner (1874–1921)

Charles Henry Kilpatrick
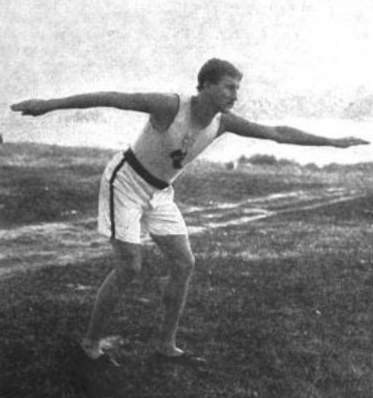
- In The Sketch, 30 June 1897
- Born: October 23, 1874; Albany, New York, U.S.
- Died: December 5, 1921 (aged 47); New York, New York, U.S.
- Occupation: Athlete
- Known for: World record for 880 yard run of 1:53.4

Charles Henry Kilpatrick (October 23, 1874 – December 5, 1921) was an American athlete. His best event was the 880 yard run, in which he became the national champion three times and established a long-lived world record time of 1:53.4.

== Biography ==
Charles Henry Kilpatrick was born in Albany, New York, on October 23, 1874 to an Irish-American family.

Kilpatrick became a noted runner while at the New York State Normal High School. He went on to study at Union College, joining the Beta Theta Pi fraternity there. It was at Union College that Kilpatrick reached his peak as a runner, breaking the world record in the 880 yards and becoming both intercollegiate and national champion in that event. In 1896, Kilpatrick switched to Princeton University, continuing his running career there. He then became athletic director at University of Wisconsin before returning to his home state and entering the employ of Spalding. Kilpatrick died of heart failure in New York City on December 5, 1921.

== Running career ==
While at Union College, Kilpatrick became the world's leading half-miler, becoming intercollegiate champion in 1894 and US champion three times between 1894 and 1896.

In a September 21, 1895 dual meet between the New York Athletic Club (which Kilpatrick represented) and the London Athletic Club, described by Sports Illustrated as the first major international track meet ever, Kilpatrick easily won the 880 yards, establishing a new world record of 1:53.4.^{[n1]} This time demolished Walter Dohm's previous record of 1:54.5, and was only beaten 14 years later by Emilio Lunghi of Italy. Kilpatrick also represented his club in the three mile run, in which he quit after five laps; this was of no consequence, as only wins counted and teammate Thomas Conneff easily took the race home.

== Notes ==
1. Often given as 1:53 2/5, to help reflect the fact the clocks only measured fifths of a second.

The difference in time between 880 yards (804.672 metres) and the now much more common 800 metres is, at that pace, approximately 0.7 seconds.

Records
Preceded by (United States) Walter Dohm	Men's 880y World Record Holder; September 21, 1895 – September 15, 1909	Succeeded by (Italy) Emilio Lunghi
