= Hornstull =

Neighborhood of Stockholm

Coordinates: 59°18′56″N 18°02′02″E

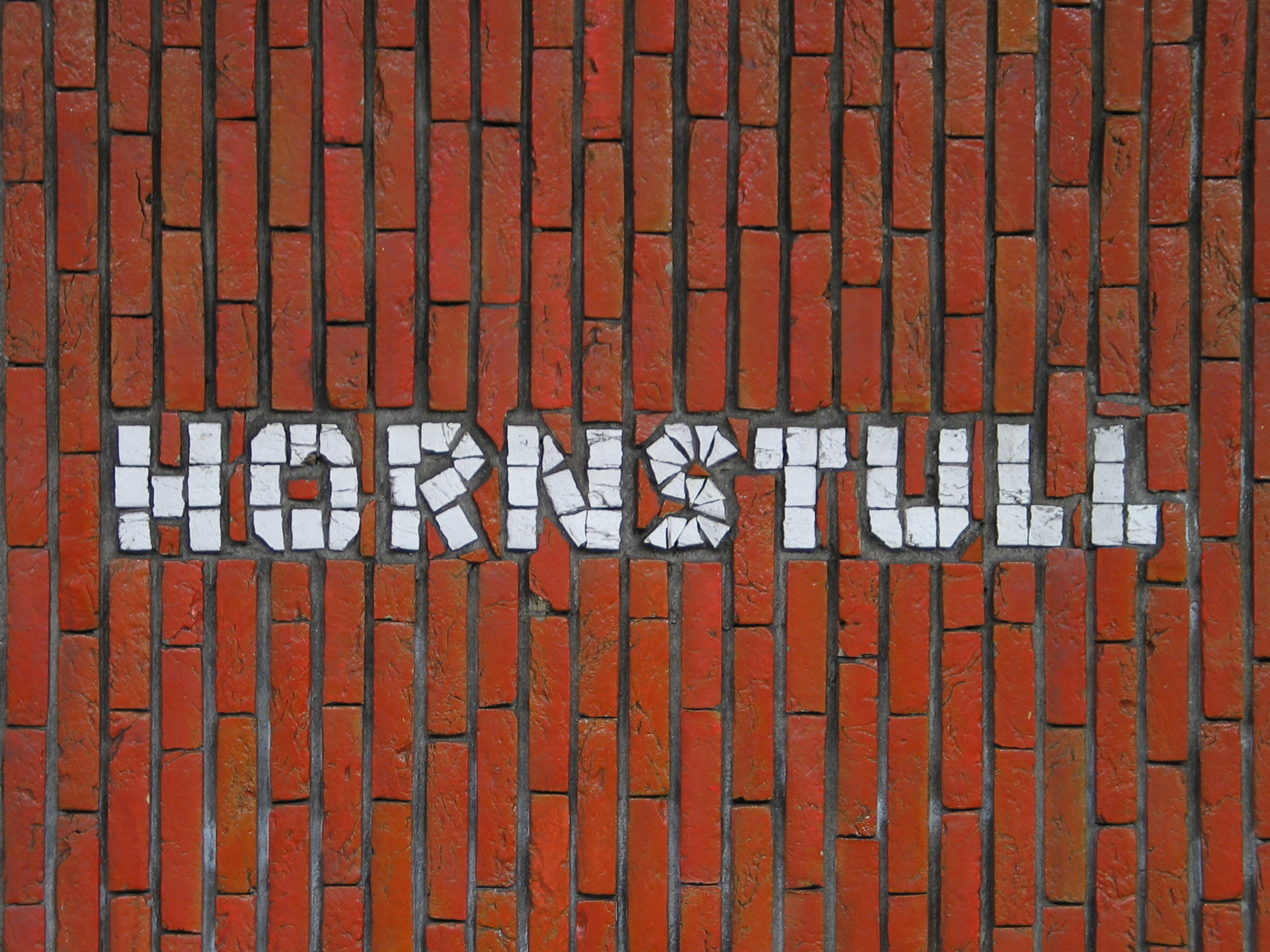
Decoration in the metro station.

Hornstull (Swedish pronunciation: [huːɳʂˈʈɵlː]) is an area in western Södermalm, Stockholm. Hornstull is actually the name of where the streets Hornsgatan and Långholmsgatan intersect. Up to the early 19th century it was also a city toll; "tull" in Swedish.

Hornstull also has a metro station, which opened on 5 April 1964.

Two of the subdivisions of Hornstull are Drakenberg, and Högalid, after which the neighbourhood school (Högalidsskolan) and parish church are named.

A weekend market has been held regularly at Hornstull, under the name "Street". Many of the merchants at the market sell their own individual fashion designs and creations. Street includes a restaurant, coffee house and a night club.

Swedish artist Ecco2k grew up in Hornstull.
