= Zinkensdamms IP =

Sports ground in Södermalm, Stockholm, Sweden

Coordinates: 59°18′56″N 18°03′00″E

Zinkensdamms idrottsplats
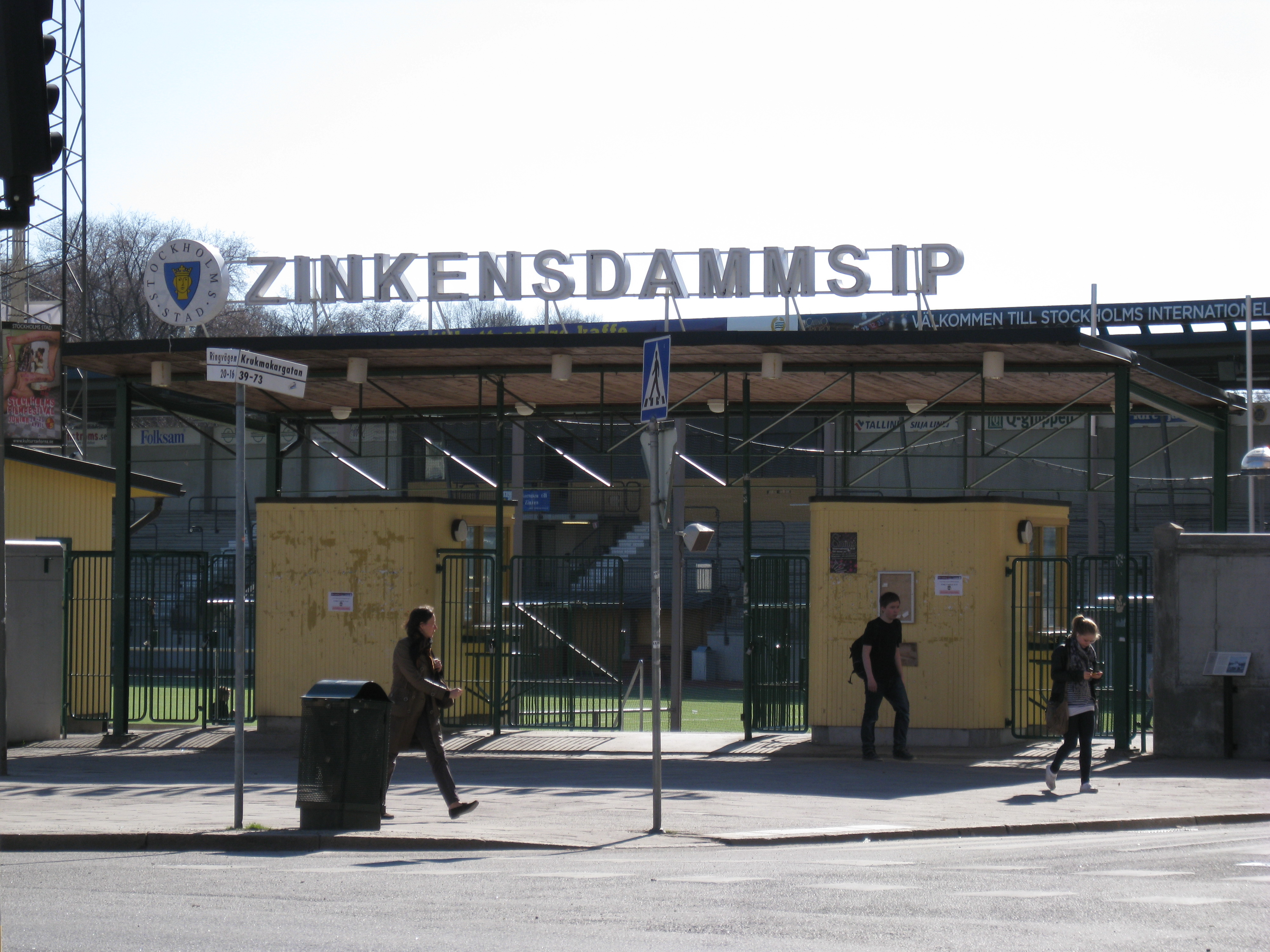
- Interactive map of Zinkensdamms idrottsplats
- Location: Stockholm, Sweden
- Owner: City of Stockholm
- Capacity: Bandy: 6,500

Construction
- Opened: 18 May 1937

Tenants
- Hammarby IF (bandy); Reymersholms IK (association football); Stockholm Mean Machines (American football)

Zinkensdamms idrottsplats, usually Zinkensdamms IP or colloquially Zinken or Zinkens, is a sports ground in the Zinkensdamm area of the island of Södermalm in central Stockholm, Sweden.

The ground was designed by architect Paul Hedqvist and was inaugurated on 18 May 1937 with a football game between Reymersholms IK and Djurgårdens IF.

Nowadays, it is mainly known for bandy, because Hammarby IF, playing in the highest bandy league in Sweden (Elitserien), use it as its home ground. The ice can be artificially frozen since 1986. It is also used as the home ground for association football team Reymersholms IK and American football team Stockholm Mean Machines. Matches were played at the 1997 European Lacrosse Championships.

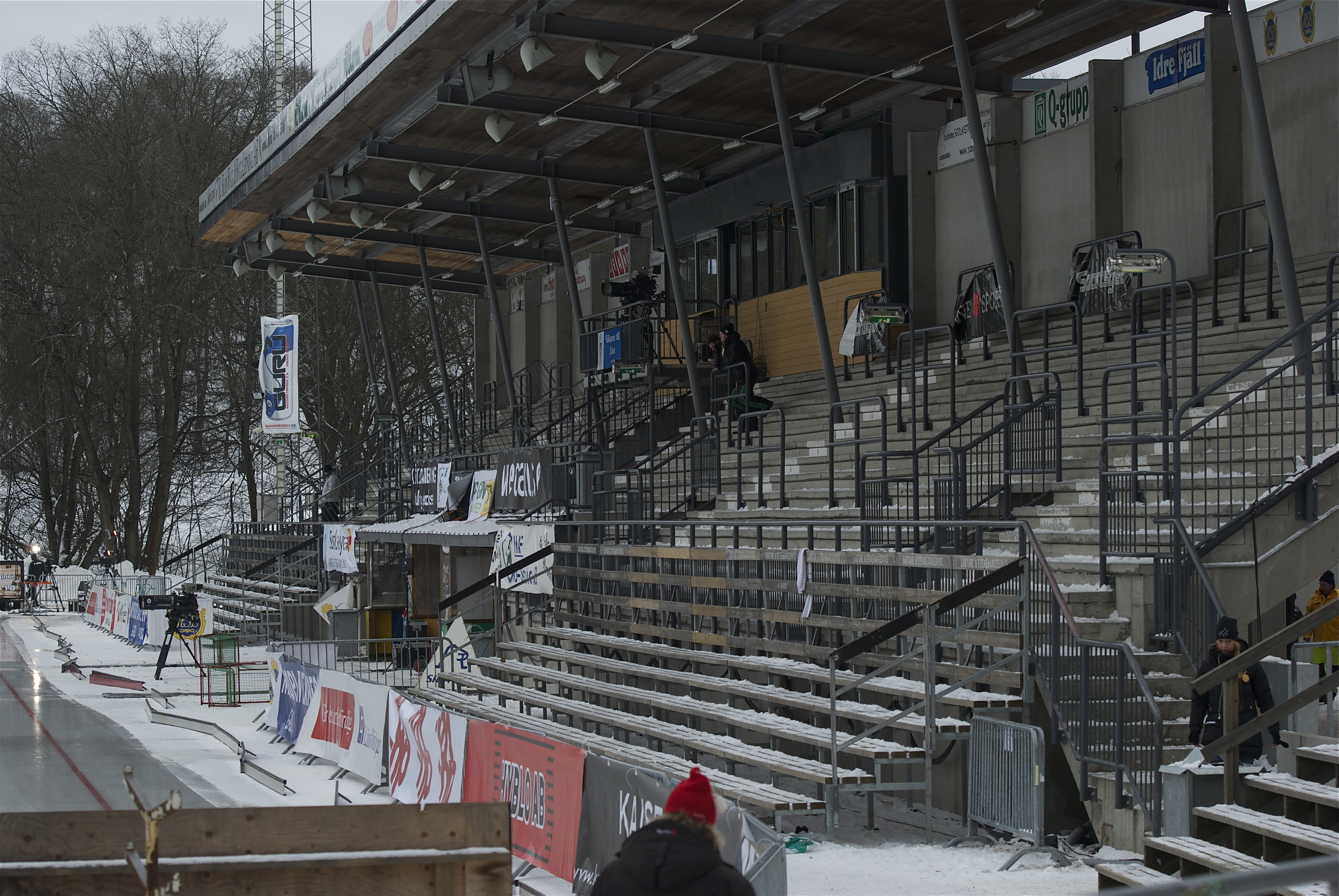
Zinkendamms IP in February 2012

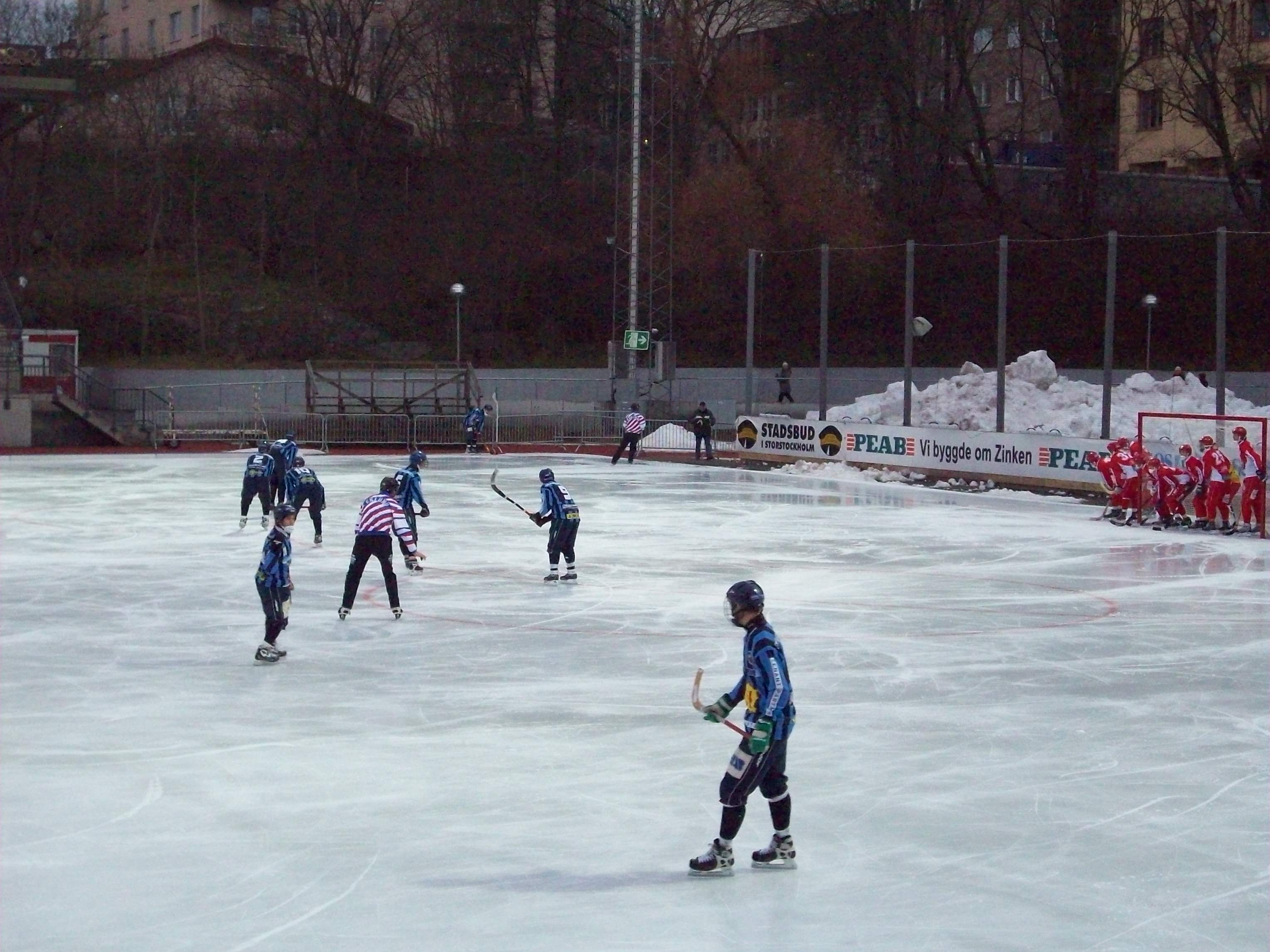
Bandy match between Djurgården and Gustavsberg

Events and tenants
Preceded by Trudovye Rezervy Stadium; Kazan	Bandy World Championship; Final Venue; 2006	Succeeded by Khimik Stadium; Kemerovo
