= Athletics at the 1960 Summer Olympics – Men's 400 metres hurdles =

Men's 400 metres hurdles at the Games of the XVII Olympiad
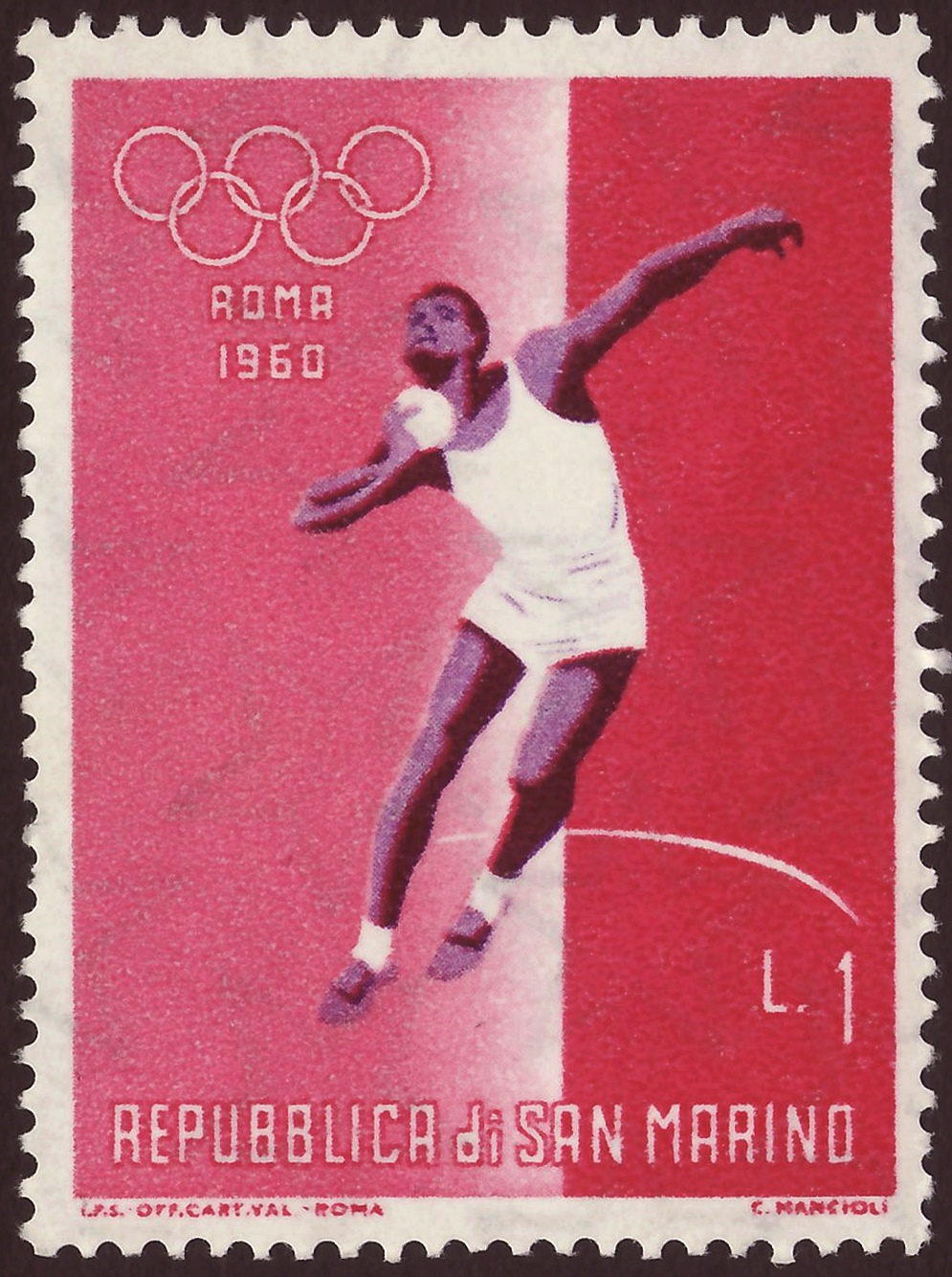
- San Marino stamp commemorating 1960 Olympic athletics
- Venue: Olympic Stadium
- Dates: August 31, 1960 (heats); September 1 (semifinals); September 2, 1960 (final)
- Competitors: 34 from 23 nations
- Winning time: 49.3 OR

Medalists
1st place, gold medalist(s)		Glenn Davis; United States
2nd place, silver medalist(s)		Cliff Cushman; United States
3rd place, bronze medalist(s)		Dick Howard; United States

The men's 400 metres hurdles event at the 1960 Olympic Games took place between August 31 and September 2. There were 34 competitors from 23 nations. The maximum number of athletes per nation had been set at 3 since the 1930 Olympic Congress. The event was won by Glenn Davis of the United States, the first man to successfully defend an Olympic title in the 400 metres hurdles. As of the 2016 Games, he remains the only man to do so; three others have won two gold medals in the event, but all three did so in nonconsecutive Games. It was the United States' fifth consecutive and 10th overall victory in the event. The Americans also completed their second consecutive (and fourth overall) medal sweep in the event, as Cliff Cushman took silver and Dick Howard took bronze.

== Background ==
This was the 12th time the event was held. It had been introduced along with the men's 200 metres hurdles in 1900, with the 200 being dropped after 1904 and the 400 being held through 1908 before being left off the 1912 programme. However, when the Olympics returned in 1920 after World War I, the men's 400 metres hurdles was back and would continue to be contested at every Games thereafter.

One of the six finalists from the 1956 Games returned: gold medalist Glenn Davis of the United States. Davis was favored to repeat; he had lowered his own world record to 49.2 seconds in 1958 and taken four of the last five AAU titles (not competing in the 1959 event). He was joined on the American team by Dick Howard (Pan American runner-up, 1959 AAU champion) and Cliff Cushman (third at the PanAm Games). The biggest challenger to Davis was Gert Potgieter of South Africa, the 1958 Commonwealth Games champion and 440 yards hurdles world record holder who had been in medal contention in the 1956 Olympic final before hitting the last hurdle and finishing sixth. Potgieter, however, had been injured in an automobile accident and was unable to compete in Rome.

Iraq, Kenya, Morocco, Norway, and Tunisia each made their debut in the event; East and West Germany competed together as the United Team of Germany for the first time. The United States made its 12th appearance, the only nation to have competed at every edition of the event to that point.

== Competition format ==
The competition used the three-round format used every Games since 1908 (except the four-round competition in 1952): heats, semifinals, and a final. Ten sets of hurdles were set on the course. The hurdles were 3 feet (91.5 centimetres) tall and were placed 35 metres apart beginning 45 metres from the starting line, resulting in a 40 metres home stretch after the last hurdle. The 400 metres track was standard.

A significant change, however, was the introduction of the "fastest loser" system. Previously, advancement depended solely on the runners' place in their heat. The 1960 competition added advancement places to the fastest runners across the qualifying heats who did not advance based on place.

There were 6 heats with between 5 and 6 athletes each. The top 2 men in each heat advanced to the semifinals, along with the next 2 fastest overall. The 14 semifinalists were divided into 2 semifinals of 7 athletes each, with the top 3 in each semifinal advancing to the 6-man final.

== Records ==
Prior to the competition, the existing world and Olympic records were as follows.

World record	Glenn Davis (USA)	49.2	Budapest, Hungary	6 August 1958
Olympic record	Eddie Southern (USA)	50.1	Melbourne, Australia	23 November 1956

Four runners went under 50 seconds (hand-timed) in the final, the first time any had done so in the Olympics. Glenn Davis's time of 49.3 seconds was the new record.

== Schedule ==
The competition used a three-day schedule, with each round on a separate day, for the first time.

All times are Central European Time (UTC+1)

Date	Time	Round
Wednesday, 31 August 1960	15:00	Heats
Thursday, 1 September 1960	16:15	Semifinals
Friday, 2 September 1960	16:00	Final

== Results ==
=== Heats ===
The fastest two hurdlers in each of the six heats and the next two fastest advanced to the semifinal round.

==== Heat 1 ====
Rank	Athlete	Nation	Time (hand)	Time (auto)	Notes
1	Bruno Galliker	Switzerland	51.0	51.20	
2	Dick Howard	United States	51.2	51.32	
3	Anubes da Silva	Brazil	52.1	52.25	
4	Max Boyes	Great Britain	52.1	52.32	
5	Wiesław Król	Poland	52.4	52.52	
6	Mohamed Zouaki	Morocco	55.2	55.65	

==== Heat 2 ====
Rank	Athlete	Nation	Time (hand)	Time (auto)	Notes
1	Jan Gulbrandsen	Norway	52.2	52.39	Q
2	Glenn Davis	United States	52.2	52.41	Q
3	Arnold Matsulevich	Soviet Union	52.9	53.00	
4	George Shepherd	Canada	53.0	53.05	
5	Marcel Lambrechts	Belgium	53.5	53.67	
	Soedjanoedji	Indonesia	DNS		

==== Heat 3 ====
Rank	Athlete	Nation	Time (hand)	Time (auto)	Notes
1	Cliff Cushman	United States	51.8	51.98	Q
2	Willi Matthias	United Team of Germany	52.1	52.23	Q
3	Keiji Ogushi	Japan	52.4	52.58	
4	Chris Goudge	Great Britain	52.6	52.75	
5	Muhammad Yaqub	Pakistan	52.8	52.91	
6	Mongi Soussi Zarrouki	Tunisia	54.3	54.34	

==== Heat 4 ====
Rank	Athlete	Nation	Time (hand)	Time (auto)	Notes
1	Georgy Chevychalov	Soviet Union	51.8	51.97	Q
2	Salvatore Morale	Italy	52.0	52.13	Q
3	Per-Owe Trollsås	Sweden	52.3	52.49	
4	Wolfgang Fischer	United Team of Germany	53.2	53.35	
5	Dimitrios Skourtis	Greece	53.7	53.85	
	Habib Sayed	Afghanistan	DNS		

==== Heat 5 ====
Rank	Athlete	Nation	Time (hand)	Time (auto)	Notes
1	Helmut Janz	United Team of Germany	51.1	51.30	Q
2	Bartonjo Rotich	Kenya	51.2	51.39	Q
3	Jussi Rintamäki	Finland	51.5	51.70	q
4	Elio Catola	Italy	51.8	51.94	q
5	Fahir Özgüden	Turkey	55.3	55.43	
6	Nazzar Al-Jamali	Iraq	58.0	Unknown	

==== Heat 6 ====
Rank	Athlete	Nation	Time (hand)	Time (auto)	Notes
1	John Metcalf	Great Britain	52.1	52.24	Q
2	Moreno Martini	Italy	52.1	52.26	Q
3	Boris Kriunov	Soviet Union	52.5	52.66	
4	Víctor Maldonado	Venezuela	52.6	52.79	
5	Zdzisław Kumiszcze	Poland	53.3	53.47	
6	Li Po-Ting	Formosa	54.1	54.23	

=== Semifinals ===
The fastest three hurdlers in each of the two heats advanced to the final round.

==== Semifinal 1 ====
Rank	Athlete	Nation	Time (hand)	Time (auto)	Notes
1	Glenn Davis	United States	51.1	51.20	Q
2	Jussi Rintamäki	Finland	51.1	51.20	Q
3	Helmut Janz	United Team of Germany	51.4	51.55	Q
4	Georgy Chevychalov	Soviet Union	52.0	52.14	
5	Elio Catola	Italy	52.3	52.44	
6	Jan Gulbrandsen	Norway	52.4	52.56	
7	Moreno Martini	Italy	52.4	52.57	

==== Semifinal 2 ====
Rank	Athlete	Nation	Time (hand)	Time (auto)	Notes
1	Cliff Cushman	United States	50.8	50.89	Q
2	Dick Howard	United States	50.8	50.91	Q
3	Bruno Galliker	Switzerland	51.3	51.47	Q
4	Salvatore Morale	Italy	51.3	51.48	
5	Bartonjo Rotich	Kenya	51.8	51.97	
6	Willi Matthias	United Team of Germany	51.8	51.95	
7	John Metcalf	Great Britain	52.5	52.72	

=== Final ===
Rank	Athlete	Nation	Time (hand)	Time (auto)	Notes
1st place, gold medalist(s)	Glenn Davis	United States	49.3	49.51	OR
2nd place, silver medalist(s)	Cliff Cushman	United States	49.6	49.77	
3rd place, bronze medalist(s)	Dick Howard	United States	49.7	49.90	
4	Helmut Janz	United Team of Germany	49.9	50.05	
5	Jussi Rintamäki	Finland	50.8	50.98	
6	Bruno Galliker	Switzerland	51.0	51.11	
			Wind: +0.1 m/s		

== Results summary ==
Rank	Athlete	Nation	Quarterfinals	Semifinals	Final	Notes
1st place, gold medalist(s)	Glenn Davis	United States	52.41	51.20	49.51	OR
2nd place, silver medalist(s)	Cliff Cushman	United States	51.98	50.89	49.77	
3rd place, bronze medalist(s)	Dick Howard	United States	51.32	50.91	49.90	
4	Helmut Janz	United Team of Germany	51.30	51.55	50.05	
5	Jussi Rintamäki	Finland	51.70	51.20	50.98	
6	Bruno Galliker	Switzerland	51.20	51.47	51.11	
7	Salvatore Morale	Italy	52.13	51.48	Did not advance	
8	Bartonjo Rotich	Kenya	51.39	51.97	Did not advance	
9	Willi Matthias	United Team of Germany	52.23	51.95	Did not advance	
10	Georgy Chevychalov	Soviet Union	51.97	52.14	Did not advance	
11	Elio Catola	Italy	51.94	52.44	Did not advance	
12	Jan Gulbrandsen	Norway	52.39	52.56	Did not advance	
13	Moreno Martini	Italy	52.26	52.57	Did not advance	
14	John Metcalf	Great Britain	52.24	52.72	Did not advance	
15	Anubes da Silva	Brazil	52.25	Did not advance		
16	Max Boyes	Great Britain	52.32	Did not advance		
17	Per-Owe Trollsås	Sweden	52.49	Did not advance		
18	Wiesław Król	Poland	52.52	Did not advance		
19	Keiji Ogushi	Japan	52.58	Did not advance		
20	Boris Kriunov	Soviet Union	52.66	Did not advance		
21	Chris Goudge	Great Britain	52.75	Did not advance		
22	Víctor Maldonado	Venezuela	52.79	Did not advance		
23	Muhammad Yaqub	Pakistan	52.91	Did not advance		
24	Arnold Matsulevich	Soviet Union	53.00	Did not advance		
25	George Shepherd	Canada	53.05	Did not advance		
26	Wolfgang Fischer	United Team of Germany	53.35	Did not advance		
27	Zdzisław Kumiszcze	Poland	53.47	Did not advance		
28	Marcel Lambrechts	Belgium	53.67	Did not advance		
29	Dimitrios Skourtis	Greece	53.85	Did not advance		
30	Li Po-Ting	Formosa	54.23	Did not advance		
31	Mongi Soussi Zarrouki	Tunisia	54.34	Did not advance		
32	Fahir Özgüden	Turkey	55.43	Did not advance		
33	Mohamed Zouaki	Morocco	55.65	Did not advance		
34	Nazzar Al-Jamali	Iraq	58.0	Did not advance		
