= Athletics at the 1961 Summer Universiade – Men's 4 × 100 metres relay =

The men's 4 × 100 metres relay event at the 1961 Summer Universiade was held at the Vasil Levski National Stadium in Sofia, Bulgaria, with the final on 1 September 1961.

== Results ==
=== Heats ===
Rank	Heat	Nation	Athletes	Time	Notes
1	1	West Germany	Hans-Jürgen Felsen, Rudolf Sundermann, Hinrick Helmke, Joachim Guter	41.6	Q
2	1	Great Britain	Berwyn Jones, Michael Robinson, George Cmela, Brian Smouha	41.7	Q
3	1	Poland	Bogusław Gierajewski, Zdzisław Szczerbański, Andrzej Tynel, ?	42.1	Q
4	1	Cuba	Enrique Figuerola, Evelio Planas, Miguel Conill, Armando Gómez	42.4	
1	2	Soviet Union	Leonid Bartenyev, Anatoly Mikhaylov, Edvin Ozolin, Igor Ter-Ovanesyan	41.2	Q
2	2	Japan	Kiyoshi Asai, Yojiro Muro, Takayuki Okazaki, Hirotada Hayase	41.5	Q
3	2	Bulgaria	Mikhail Bachvarov, Veselin Valov, Petar Petrov, Borislav Stoynev	41.6	Q
4	2	Turkey	Aydin Onur, Ferruh Oygur, Ahmet Akbaş, Hüseyin Çakmak	43.8	

=== Final ===
Rank	Nation	Athletes	Time	Notes
1st place, gold medalist(s)	Soviet Union	Leonid Bartenyev, Valentin Chistyakov, Anatoly Mikhaylov, Edvin Ozolin	41.22	
2nd place, silver medalist(s)	Japan	Kiyoshi Asai, Hirotada Hayase, Yojiro Muro, Takayuki Okazaki	41.30	
3rd place, bronze medalist(s)	West Germany	Hans-Jürgen Felsen, Rudolf Sundermann, Hinrick Helmke, Joachim Guter	41.35	
4	Great Britain	Berwyn Jones, Michael Robinson, George Cmela, Brian Smouha	41.50	
5	Bulgaria	Ivan Ivanov, Veselin Valov, Petar Petrov, Borislav Stoynev	41.67	
6	Poland	Bogusław Gierajewski, Zdzisław Szczerbański, Andrzej Tynel, ?	41.9	
