= Athletics at the 1961 Summer Universiade – Men's 100 metres =

The men's 100 metres event at the 1961 Summer Universiade was held at the Vasil Levski National Stadium in Sofia, Bulgaria, in September 1961.

== Medalists ==
Gold	Silver	Bronze
Enrique Figuerola; Cuba	Berwyn Jones; Great Britain	László Mihályfi; Hungary

== Results ==
=== Heats ===
Rank	Heat	Name	Nationality	Time	Notes
1	1	Enrique Figuerola	Cuba	10.4	Q
2	1	Jalal Gosal	Indonesia	10.7	Q
3	1	Gustav Ntiforo	Ghana	10.7	Q
5	1	Zdzisław Szczerbański	Poland	10.9	
1	2	Mikhail Bachvarov	Bulgaria	10.57	Q
2	2	Yojiro Muro	Japan	10.70	Q
2	2	Igor Ter-Ovanesyan	Soviet Union	10.70	Q
3	2	George Cmela	Great Britain	10.77	Q
4	2	John Attah Nyamikye	Ghana	10.9	
5	2	Levi Psavkin	Israel	11.0	
6	2	Joseph Haddad Souhail	Lebanon	11.7	
1	3	Berwyn Jones	Great Britain	10.63	Q
2	3	László Mihályfi	Hungary	10.73	Q
3	3	Rudolf Sundermann	West Germany	10.82	Q
4	3	Aydin Onur	Turkey	10.85	
4	3	Ferruh Oygur	Turkey	10.91	
5	3	Miguel Conill	Cuba	10.8	
1	4	Edvins Ozolins	Soviet Union	10.66	Q
2	4	Hans-Jürgen Felsen	West Germany	10.89	Q
4	4	Zdzisław Szczerbański	Poland	10.92	
2	5	Kiyoshi Asai	Japan	10.80	Q
3	5	Jorge Soares	Portugal	11.03	Q
4	5	Wahjudi Babang	Indonesia	11.1	
1	6	Veselin Valov	Bulgaria	10.69	Q
2	6	Aarre Asiala	Finland	10.87	Q
3	6	Gerd Nöster	Austria	10.91	Q
4	6	Hubert Figeys	Belgium	11.1	

=== Semifinals ===
Rank	Heat	Name	Nationality	Time	Notes
1	1	Enrique Figuerola	Cuba	10.53	Q
2	1	Igor Ter-Ovanesyan	Soviet Union	10.73	Q
3	1	Yojiro Muro	Japan	10.73	
4	1	Hans-Jürgen Felsen	West Germany	10.81	
5	1	Gerd Nöster	Austria	10.88	
1	2	Mikhail Bachvarov	Bulgaria	10.67	Q
2	2	László Mihályfi	Hungary	10.70	Q
3	2	George Cmela	Great Britain	10.83	
4	2	Jorge Soares	Portugal	10.90	
5	2	Ferruh Oygur	Turkey	11.00	
1	3	Berwyn Jones	Great Britain	10.62	Q
2	3	Edvins Ozolins	Soviet Union	10.77	Q
3	3	Rudolf Sundermann	West Germany	10.81	
4	3	Kiyoshi Asai	Japan	10.89	
5	3	Gustav Ntiforo	Ghana	11.00	

=== Final ===
Final was wind assisted

Rank	Athlete	Nationality	Time	Notes
1st place, gold medalist(s)	Enrique Figuerola	Cuba	10.38	
2nd place, silver medalist(s)	Berwyn Jones	Great Britain	10.59	
3rd place, bronze medalist(s)	László Mihályfi	Hungary	10.65	
4	Edvins Ozolins	Soviet Union	10.68	
	Mikhail Bachvarov	Bulgaria	DNS	
	Igor Ter-Ovanesyan	Soviet Union	DNS	
