= Athletics at the 1957 World University Games – Men's 400 metres =

The men's 400 metres event at the 1957 World University Games was held at the Stadium Charlety in Paris on 5 and 6 September 1957.

== Medalists ==
Gold	Silver	Bronze
Jim Paterson; Great Britain	Walter Oberste; West Germany	Csaba Csutorás; Hungary

== Results ==
=== Heats ===
Held on 5 September

Rank	Heat	Athlete	Nationality	Time	Notes
1	1	Jean-Pierre Goudeau	France	50.4	Q
2	1	Enrico Archilli	Italy	53.9	Q
1	2	Anubes da Silva	Brazil	49.6	Q
2	2	Keiji Ogushi	Japan	50.4	Q
3	2	Elio Catola	Italy	50.5	Q
4	2	Georgi Nechev	Bulgaria	50.6	
1	3	Günther Glaeske	West Germany	49.4	Q
2	3	Michel Grosdemange	France	49.5	Q
3	3	Josef Trousil	Czechoslovakia	49.8	Q
4	3	Jesús Rancaño	Spain	51.1	
1	4	Walter Oberste	West Germany	49.2	Q
2	4	Miloje Grujić	Yugoslavia	49.4	Q
3	4	Jozef Kočiš	Czechoslovakia	50.1	Q
4	4	Jacques Bierlaire	Belgium	51.1	
5	4	Reynolds	Ireland	54.4	
1	5	Jim Paterson	Great Britain	48.6	Q
2	5	Csaba Csutorás	Hungary	49.8	Q
3	5	Otto Klappert	West Germany	50.0	Q
4	5	Mario Paoletti	Italy	50.7	
5	5	Juan Piqueras	Spain	50.9	
1	6	Chris Goudge	Great Britain	49.3	Q
2	6	Traian Sudrigean	Romania	49.8	Q
3	6	Janusz Ludka	Poland	49.8	Q
4	6	Valentin Starcev	Bulgaria	50.0	
5	6	Fernando Bremón	Spain	50.4	

=== Semifinals ===
Held on 6 September

Rank	Heat	Athlete	Nationality	Time	Notes
1	1	Jim Paterson	Great Britain	48.5	Q
2	1	Josef Trousil	Czechoslovakia	49.1	Q
3	1	Otto Klappert	West Germany	49.1	
4	1	Jean-Pierre Goudeau	France	50.1	
5	1	Janusz Ludka	Poland	50.7	
6	1	Elio Catola	Italy	51.1	
1	2	Walter Oberste	West Germany	48.9	Q
2	2	Csaba Csutorás	Hungary	49.2	Q
3	2	Anubes da Silva	Brazil	49.5	
4	2	Enrico Archilli	Italy	49.9	
5	2	Michel Grosdemange	France	50.0	
6	2	Traian Sudrigean	Romania	50.1	
1	3	Miloje Grujić	Yugoslavia	49.3	Q
2	3	Günther Glaeske	West Germany	49.9	Q
3	3	Jozef Kočiš	Czechoslovakia	50.0	
4	3	Chris Goudge	Great Britain	51.0	
	3	Keiji Ogushi	Japan	?	

=== Final ===
Held on 6 September

Rank	Name	Nationality	Time	Notes
1st place, gold medalist(s)	Jim Paterson	Great Britain	48.4	
2nd place, silver medalist(s)	Walter Oberste	West Germany	48.8	
3rd place, bronze medalist(s)	Csaba Csutorás	Hungary	48.8	
4	Josef Trousil	Czechoslovakia	49.0	
5	Miloje Grujić	Yugoslavia	49.0	
6	Günther Glaeske	West Germany	51.4	
