= Athletics at the 1961 Summer Universiade – Men's 200 metres =

The men's 200 metres event at the 1961 Summer Universiade was held at the Vasil Levski National Stadium in Sofia, Bulgaria, on 1 and September 1961.

== Medalists ==
Gold	Silver	Bronze
László Mihályfi; Hungary	Brian Smouha; Great Britain	Brian Anson; Great Britain

== Results ==
=== Heats ===
Rank	Heat	Name	Nationality	Time	Notes
1	1	Edvins Ozolins	Soviet Union	21.6	Q
2	1	Gustav Ntiforo	Ghana	21.8	Q
3	1	Hubert Figeys	Belgium	22.2	Q
4	1	Wahjudi Babang	Indonesia	22.7	
1	2	Hinrik Helmke	West Germany	22.9	Q
2	2	Zdzisław Szczerbański	Poland	23.0	Q
1	3	László Mihályfi	Hungary	21.6	Q
2	3	Brian Anson	Great Britain	21.6	Q
3	3	Heinz-Uwe Bordtheiser	West Germany	21.8	Q
4	3	Ferruh Oygur	Turkey	22.1	
5	3	Armando Gómez	Cuba	23.2	
1	4	Brian Smouha	Great Britain	21.2	Q
2	4	Jorge Soares	Portugal	22.6	Q
1	5	Hirotada Hayase	Japan	21.72	Q
2	5	Leonid Bartenyev	Soviet Union	21.7	Q
3	5	Bogusław Gierajewski	Poland	25.0	Q
1	6	Yojiro Muro	Japan	21.6	Q
2	6	Wilfried Geeroms	Belgium	22.02	Q
3	6	Enrique Figuerola	Cuba	22.0	Q
	6	Gerd Nöster	Austria	DQ	

=== Semifinals ===
Rank	Heat	Name	Nationality	Time	Notes
1	1	László Mihályfi	Hungary	21.41	Q
2	1	Yojiro Muro	Japan	21.60	Q
3	1	Edvins Ozolins	Soviet Union	21.6	
4	1	Bogusław Gierajewski	Poland	21.7	
5	1	Heinz-Uwe Bordtheiser	West Germany	21.8	
6	1	Wilfried Geeroms	Belgium	22.1	
1	2	Brian Anson	Great Britain	21.3	Q
2	2	Leonid Bartenyev	Soviet Union	21.5	Q
3	2	Zdzisław Szczerbański	Poland	21.8	
4	2	Jorge Soares	Portugal	22.19	
1	3	Brian Smouha	Great Britain	21.1	Q
2	3	Hirotada Hayase	Japan	21.5	Q
3	3	Gustav Ntiforo	Ghana	22.0	
4	3	Hubert Figeys	Belgium	22.3	

=== Final ===
Rank	Athlete	Nationality	Time	Notes
1st place, gold medalist(s)	László Mihályfi	Hungary	21.27	
2nd place, silver medalist(s)	Brian Smouha	Great Britain	21.40	
3rd place, bronze medalist(s)	Brian Anson	Great Britain	21.51	
4	Leonid Bartenyev	Soviet Union	21.58	
5	Hirotada Hayase	Japan	21.70	
6	Yojiro Muro	Japan	21.84	
