= Athletics at the 1961 Summer Universiade – Men's 400 metres hurdles =

The men's 400 metres hurdles event at the 1961 Summer Universiade was held at the Vasil Levski National Stadium in Sofia, Bulgaria, on 31 August and 1 September 1961.

Morale's winning margin was 1.66 seconds which as of 2024 remains the only time the men's 400 metres hurdles was won by more than 1.1 seconds at these games.

== Medalists ==
Gold	Silver	Bronze
Salvatore Morale; Italy	Georgiy Chevychalov; Soviet Union	Elio Catalo; Italy

== Results ==
=== Heats ===
Rank	Heat	Name	Nationality	Time	Notes
1	1	Salvatore Morale	Italy	51.65	Q
2	1	Wiesław Król	Poland	52.74	Q
3	1	Albert Grawitz	West Germany	52.87	
4	1	Michael Robinson	Great Britain	53.17	
5	1	Jacques Pennewaert	Belgium	53.25	
6	1	Raúl Fernández	Cuba	55.3	
1	2	Georgiy Chevychalov	Soviet Union	53.07	Q
2	2	Elio Catalo	Italy	53.65	Q
3	2	Miroslav Jaroš	Czechoslovakia	53.9	
4	2	Janusz Wolf	Poland	54.0	
5	2	Dimitar Dimitrov	Bulgaria	54.2	
6	2	Aydin Tunali	Turkey	57.9	
1	3	Valeriu Jurcă	Romania	53.26	Q
2	3	John Cooper	Great Britain	53.42	Q
3	3	Keiko Iijima	Japan	53.47	
4	3	Jürgen Demmel	West Germany	54.2	
5	3	Abdul Saleh	Indonesia	55.9	

=== Final ===
Rank	Athlete	Nationality	Time	Notes
1st place, gold medalist(s)	Salvatore Morale	Italy	50.14	
2nd place, silver medalist(s)	Georgiy Chevychalov	Soviet Union	51.80	
3rd place, bronze medalist(s)	Elio Catalo	Italy	52.33	
4	Wiesław Król	Poland	52.76	
5	John Cooper	Great Britain	53.3	
6	Valeriu Jurcă	Romania	53.7	
