= Athletics at the 1961 Summer Universiade – Men's 4 × 400 metres relay =

The men's 4 × 400 metres relay event at the 1961 Summer Universiade was held at the Vasil Levski National Stadium in Sofia, Bulgaria, in September 1961.

== Results ==
=== Heats ===
Rank	Heat	Nation	Athletes	Time	Notes
1	1	Czechoslovakia	Josef Trousil, Josef Odložil, Milan Jílek, Tomáš Salinger	3:44.5	Q
2	1	Italy	Bruno Bianchi, Elio Catalo, Salvatore Morale, ?	3:53.5	Q
3	1	Great Britain	Ming Campbell, John Cooper, Mike Fleet, Mike Robinson	3:53.5	Q
1	2	Bulgaria	Dimitar Dimitrov, Georgi Latchev, Anton Antonov, Georgi Zapundzhiev	3:19.5	Q
2	2	West Germany	Peter Hoppe, Wolfgang Schöll, Otto Graßhoff, Albert Grawitz	3:21.1	Q
3	2	Poland	Wiesław Król, Bogusław Gierajewski, Janusz Ludka, ?	3:24.1	Q
4	2	Turkey	Aydin Onur, Özen Tuncel, Ahmet Akbaş, Hüseyin Çakmak	3:25.6	

=== Final ===
Rank	Nation	Athletes	Time	Notes
1st place, gold medalist(s)	West Germany	Peter Hoppe, Wolfgang Schöll, Otto Graßhoff, Albert Grawitz	3:10.56	
2nd place, silver medalist(s)	Czechoslovakia	Josef Trousil, Josef Odložil, Milan Jílek, Tomáš Salinger	3:12.93	
3rd place, bronze medalist(s)	Great Britain	Ming Campbell, John Cooper, Mike Fleet, Mike Robinson	3:14.63	
4	Poland	Wiesław Król, Bogusław Gierajewski, Janusz Ludka, Jerzy Kloze	3:16.76	
5	Bulgaria	Dimitar Dimitrov, Georgi Latchev, Anton Antonov, Georgi Zapundzhiev	3:17.86	
	Italy		?	
