= Athletics at the 1957 World University Games – Men's 4 × 400 metres relay =

The men's 4 × 400 metres relay event at the 1957 World University Games was held at the Stadium Charlety in Paris with the final on 8 September 1957.

== Results ==
=== Final ===
Rank	Nation	Athletes	Time	Notes
1st place, gold medalist(s)	West Germany	Günther Glaeske, Otto Klappert, Ralph Seidel, Walter Oberste	3:16.9	
2nd place, silver medalist(s)	Great Britain	Chris Goudge, Les Locke, Edward Buswell, Jim Paterson	3:18.6	
3rd place, bronze medalist(s)	Italy	Germano Gimelli, Elio Catola, Mario Paoletti, Enrico Archilli	3:21.8	
4	Bulgaria	Angelov, Valentin Starcev, Mikhail Bachvarov, Georgi Nechev	3:22.4	
5	France	André Wendling, Jean-Marie Argelès, Michel Grosdemange, Jean-Pierre Goudeau	3:22.9	
6	Spain	Jesús Rancaño, Fernando Bremón, Juan Piqueras, Manuel García Cabrera	3:26.5	
