= Athletics at the 1961 Summer Universiade – Men's 400 metres =

The men's 400 metres event at the 1961 Summer Universiade was held at the Vasil Levski National Stadium in Sofia, Bulgaria, in September 1961.

== Medalists ==
Gold	Silver	Bronze
Josef Trousil; Czechoslovakia	Jacques Pennewaert; Belgium	Otto Grasshoff; West Germany

== Results ==
=== Heats ===
Rank	Heat	Name	Nationality	Time	Notes
1	1	Carl-Gustaf Johansson	Sweden	48.28	Q
2	1	Bogusław Gierajewski	Poland	48.31	Q
3	1	Peter Hoppe	West Germany	48.73	
4	1	Ming Campbell	Great Britain	49.3	
5	1	Georgi Latchev	Bulgaria	50.5	
1	2	Jacques Pennewaert	Belgium	47.78	Q
2	2	Bruno Bianchi	Italy	48.84	Q
3	2	Anton Antonov	Bulgaria	50.2	
1	3	Josef Trousil	Czechoslovakia	47.46	Q
2	3	Otto Grasshoff	West Germany	48.06	Q
3	3	Hirotada Hayase	Japan	48.59	
4	3	Janusz Ludka	Poland	49.33	
5	3	Hubert Figeys	Belgium	50.4	

=== Final ===
Rank	Athlete	Nationality	Time	Notes
1st place, gold medalist(s)	Josef Trousil	Czechoslovakia	47.51	
2nd place, silver medalist(s)	Jacques Pennewaert	Belgium	48.06	
3rd place, bronze medalist(s)	Otto Grasshoff	West Germany	48.53	
4	Carl-Gustaf Johansson	Sweden	48.61	
5	Bogusław Gierajewski	Poland	48.74	
6	Bruno Bianchi	Italy	49.30	
