= Athletics at the 1959 Summer Universiade – Men's 400 metres =

The men's 400 metres event at the 1959 Summer Universiade was held at the Stadio Comunale di Torino in Turin with the final on 3, 4 and 5 September 1959.

== Medalists ==
Gold	Silver	Bronze
Viktor Šnajder; Yugoslavia	Walter Oberste; West Germany	Otto Klappert; West Germany

== Results ==
=== Heats ===
Rank	Heat	Athlete	Nationality	Time	Notes
1	1	Walter Oberste	West Germany	48.9	Q
2	1	René Sadler	France	49.0	Q
3	1	Zygmunt Czapracki	Poland	49.7	Q
4	1	Nisar	Pakistan	50.9	
1	2	Josef Trousil	Czechoslovakia	49.0	Q
2	2	Robert Hay	Great Britain	49.5	Q
3	2	Jacques Pennewaert	Belgium	49.5	Q
4	2	Janusz Ludka	Poland	49.6	
1	3	Jean-Marie Cheuvart	Belgium	55.9	Q
2	3	José Luis Martínez	Spain	55.9	Q
3	3	Traian Sudrigean	Romania	55.9	Q
1	4	Otto Klappert	West Germany	48.7	Q
2	4	Daniel Laurent	France	49.8	Q
3	4	Costa Martins	Portugal	52.5	Q
4	4	Michel Tawil	Lebanon	54.8	
1	5	Viktor Šnajder	Yugoslavia	48.8	Q
2	5	Nereo Fossati	Italy	48.8	Q
3	5	Norman Futter	Great Britain	49.6	Q
4	5	Paul Sahl	Luxembourg	49.9	
1	5	Eldo Manaresi	Italy	49.9	Q
2	5	Jesús Rancaño	Spain	51.0	Q

=== Semifinals ===
Rank	Heat	Athlete	Nationality	Time	Notes
1	1	Viktor Šnajder	Yugoslavia	47.7	Q
2	1	Josef Trousil	Czechoslovakia	48.1	Q
3	1	Nereo Fossati	Italy	48.3	
4	1	José Luis Martínez	Spain	49.0	
5	1	Robert Hay	Great Britain	49.6	
6	1	Daniel Laurent	France	50.4	
1	2	Walter Oberste	West Germany	48.4	Q
2	2	Norman Futter	Great Britain	48.7	Q
3	2	Zygmunt Czapracki	Poland	49.2	
4	2	Eldo Manaresi	Italy	49.9	
5	2	Jacques Pennewaert	Belgium	50.1	
1	3	Otto Klappert	West Germany	47.8	Q
2	3	Traian Sudrigean	Romania	47.8	Q
3	3	René Sadler	France	48.3	
4	3	Jesús Rancaño	Spain	48.8	
5	3	Jean-Marie Cheuvart	Belgium	49.8	
	?	Costa Martins	Portugal	?	

=== Final ===
Rank	Name	Nationality	Time	Notes
1st place, gold medalist(s)	Viktor Šnajder	Yugoslavia	47.5	
2nd place, silver medalist(s)	Walter Oberste	West Germany	47.9	
3rd place, bronze medalist(s)	Otto Klappert	West Germany	47.9	
4	Josef Trousil	Czechoslovakia	48.0	
5	Traian Sudrigean	Romania	48.2	
6	Norman Futter	Great Britain	48.5	
