= Athletics at the 1959 Pan American Games – Men's 400 metres hurdles =

Men's 400 metres hurdles at the Pan American Games

The men's 400 metres hurdles event at the 1959 Pan American Games was held at the Soldier Field in Chicago on 28 and 29 August.

== Medalists ==
Gold	Silver	Bronze
Josh Culbreath; United States	Dick Howard; United States	Cliff Cushman; United States

== Results ==
=== Heats ===
Rank	Heat	Name	Nationality	Time	Notes
1	1	Josh Culbreath	United States	53.2	Q
2	1	Victor Flores	Venezuela	54.1	Q
3	1	Anubes da Silva	Brazil	54.4	Q
	1	Ovidio de Jesús	Puerto Rico	DNF	
	1	Heber Etcheverry	Uruguay	DQ	
1	2	Dick Howard	United States	53.5	Q
2	2	Cliff Cushman	United States	53.5	Q
3	2	Ulysses dos Santos	Brazil	53.6	Q
4	2	Gabriel Roldán	Mexico	54.5	
5	2	George Shepherd	Canada	55.6	
6	2	Armando Betancourt	Cuba	??.?	

=== Final ===
Rank	Name	Nationality	Time	Notes
1st place, gold medalist(s)	Josh Culbreath	United States	51.2	
2nd place, silver medalist(s)	Dick Howard	United States	51.3	
3rd place, bronze medalist(s)	Cliff Cushman	United States	53.0	
4	Anubes da Silva	Brazil	53.1	
5	Ulysses dos Santos	Brazil	53.2	
6	Victor Flores	Venezuela	53.4	
