= Athletics at the 1965 Summer Universiade – Men's 110 metres hurdles =

The men's 110 metres hurdles event at the 1965 Summer Universiade was held at the People's Stadium in Budapest on 28 and 29 August 1965.

== Medalists ==
Gold	Silver	Bronze
Eddy Ottoz; Italy	Giovanni Cornacchia; Italy	Willie Davenport; United States

== Results ==
=== Heats ===
Wind:
Heat 1: ? m/s, Heat 2: +2.1 m/s

Rank	Heat	Athlete	Nationality	Time	Notes
1	1	Giovanni Cornacchia	Italy	14.2	Q
2	1	Akira Tanaka	Japan	14.2	Q
3	1	Willie Davenport	United States	14.2	Q
4	1	Bernard Fournet	France	14.4	Q
5	1	Werner Eckle	West Germany	14.6	
6	1	František Fojt	Czechoslovakia	14.9	
7	1	Krasimir Petkov	Bulgaria	15.2	
8	1	Yuriy Rusanov	Soviet Union	15.3	
1	2	Eddy Ottoz	Italy	14.0	Q
2	2	Valentin Chistyakov	Soviet Union	14.1	Q
3	2	Jean-Paul Jeannet	France	14.2	Q
4	2	Athanasios Lazaridis	Greece	14.5	Q
5	2	Viorel Suciu	Romania	14.5	
6	2	Luc Legros	Belgium	14.8	

=== Final ===
Wind: +0.6 m/s

Rank	Name	Nationality	Time	Notes
1st place, gold medalist(s)	Eddy Ottoz	Italy	13.6	UR, NR
2nd place, silver medalist(s)	Giovanni Cornacchia	Italy	13.9	
3rd place, bronze medalist(s)	Willie Davenport	United States	14.0	
4	Valentin Chistyakov	Soviet Union	14.1	
5	Jean-Paul Jeannet	France	14.2	
6	Bernard Fournet	France	14.3	
7	Akira Tanaka	Japan	14.4	
8	Athanasios Lazaridis	Greece	14.5	
