= 1962 European Athletics Championships – Men's 400 metres hurdles =

Men's 400 metres hurdles at the European Athletics Championships

The men's 400 metres hurdles at the 1962 European Athletics Championships was held in Belgrade, then Yugoslavia, at JNA Stadium on 12, 13, and 14 September 1962.

== Medalists ==
Gold	Salvatore Morale; Italy
Silver	Jörg Neumann; East Germany
Bronze	Helmut Janz; West Germany

== Results ==
=== Final ===
14 September

Rank	Name	Nationality	Time	Notes
1st place, gold medalist(s)	Salvatore Morale	Italy	49.2	WR
2nd place, silver medalist(s)	Jörg Neumann	East Germany	50.3	
3rd place, bronze medalist(s)	Helmut Janz	West Germany	50.5	
4	Jussi Rintamäki	Finland	50.8	
5	Boris Kryunov	Soviet Union	51.3	
6	Vasyl Anisimov	Soviet Union	54.2	

=== Semi-finals ===
13 September

==== Semi-final 1 ====
Rank	Name	Nationality	Time	Notes
1	Salvatore Morale	Italy	50.0	CR Q
2	Jörg Neumann	East Germany	50.6	Q
3	Boris Kryunov	Soviet Union	50.9	Q
4	Edmond Van Praagh	France	51.3	NR
5	Bruno Galliker	Switzerland	51.3	
6	Joachim Singer	East Germany	51.4	

==== Semi-final 2 ====
Rank	Name	Nationality	Time	Notes
1	Vasyl Anisimov	Soviet Union	51.0	Q
2	Jussi Rintamäki	Finland	51.0	Q
3	Helmut Janz	West Germany	51.1	Q
4	Georgiy Chevychalov	Soviet Union	51.6	
5	Chris Surety	Great Britain	52.0	
6	Valeriu Jurcă	Romania	52.8	

=== Heats ===
12 September

==== Heat 1 ====
Rank	Name	Nationality	Time	Notes
1	Helmut Janz	West Germany	51.0	Q
2	Boris Kryunov	Soviet Union	51.7	Q
3	Valeriu Jurcă	Romania	52.0	Q
4	Helmut Haid	Austria	52.7	
5	Hannu Ehoniemi	Finland	52.8	
6	Fahir Özgüden	Turkey	54.4	

==== Heat 2 ====
Rank	Name	Nationality	Time	Notes
1	Salvatore Morale	Italy	51.4	Q
2	Jussi Rintamäki	Finland	52.4	Q
3	Chris Surety	Great Britain	52.8	Q
4	Dimitar Dimitrov	Bulgaria	53.1	
5	François Van Cauwenbergh	Belgium	53.5	
6	Athanasios Mylonopoulos	Greece	54.9	

==== Heat 3 ====
Rank	Name	Nationality	Time	Notes
1	Edmond Van Praagh	France	51.4	NR Q
2	Georgiy Chevychalov	Soviet Union	52.0	Q
3	Joachim Singer	East Germany	52.0	Q
4	John Cooper	Great Britain	52.4	
5	Zdzisław Kumiszcze	Poland	52.6	

==== Heat 4 ====
Rank	Name	Nationality	Time	Notes
1	Vasyl Anisimov	Soviet Union	51.8	Q
2	Bruno Galliker	Switzerland	52.2	Q
3	Jörg Neumann	East Germany	52.8	Q
4	Robin Woodland	Great Britain	53.1	
5	Jan Gulbrandsen	Norway	53.8	

== Participation ==
According to an unofficial count, 22 athletes from 16 countries participated in the event.

- Austria (1)
- Belgium (1)
- Bulgaria (1)
- East Germany (2)
- Finland (2)
- France (1)
- Greece (1)
- Italy (1)
- Norway (1)
- Poland (1)
- Romania (1)
- Soviet Union (3)
- Switzerland (1)
- Turkey (1)
- Great Britain (3)
- West Germany (1)
