= Athletics at the 1959 Summer Universiade – Men's 4 × 400 metres relay =

Men's relay event

The men's 4 × 400 metres relay event at the 1959 Summer Universiade was held at the Stadio Comunale di Torino in Turin on 5 and 6 September 1959.

== Results ==
=== Heats ===
Rank	Heat	Nation	Athletes	Time	Notes
1	1	West Germany	Albert Grawitz, Burkhart Quantz, Walter Oberste, Otto Klappert	3:21.6	Q
2	1	France	Daniel Laurent, Paul Haennig, Jean-Marie Kling, René Sadler	3:21.6	Q
3	1	Poland	Bogusław Gierajewski, Jan Cholewa, Janusz Ludka, Zygmunt Czapracki	3:21.6	Q
4	1	Luxembourg	Paul Sahl, Lieb, Norbert Haupert, Roger Bofferding	3:27.1	
5	1	Switzerland	Eric Harder, Alex Egloff, Franz Thomet, Heinz Bösiger	3:29.8	
1	2	Italy	Elio Catola, Nereo Fossati, Mario Fraschini, Germano Gimelli	3:53.5	Q
2	2	Great Britain	Robert Hay, Mike Robinson, John Holt, Norman Futter	3:53.6	Q
3	2	Spain	Jesús Rancaño, Elías Reguero, José Gómez Velesca, José Luis Martínez	3:53.7	Q

=== Final ===
Rank	Nation	Athletes	Time	Notes
1st place, gold medalist(s)	West Germany	Albert Grawitz, Burkhart Quantz, Walter Oberste, Otto Klappert	3:09.5	
2nd place, silver medalist(s)	Italy	Elio Catola, Nereo Fossati, Mario Fraschini, Germano Gimelli	3:11.4	
3rd place, bronze medalist(s)	Great Britain	Robert Hay, Mike Robinson, John Holt, Norman Futter	3:12.2	
4	Poland	Bogusław Gierajewski, Jan Cholewa, Janusz Ludka, Zygmunt Czapracki	3:12.8	
5	France	Daniel Laurent, Paul Haennig, Jean-Marie Kling, René Sadler	3:16.1	
6	Spain	Jesús Rancaño, Elías Reguero, José Gómez Velesca, José Luis Martínez	3:16.6	
