= Athletics at the 1961 Summer Universiade – Men's 110 metres hurdles =

The men's 110 metres hurdles event at the 1961 Summer Universiade was held at the Vasil Levski National Stadium in Sofia, Bulgaria, on 3 September 1961.

== Medalists ==
Gold	Silver	Bronze
Valentin Chistyakov; Soviet Union	Klaus Willimczik; West Germany	Wiesław Król; Poland

== Results ==
=== Heats ===
Rank	Heat	Name	Nationality	Time	Notes
1	1	Anatoliy Mikhaylov	Soviet Union	14.49	Q
2	1	Klaus Willimczik	West Germany	14.65	Q
3	1	Michael Robinson	Great Britain	14.76	
4	1	Pavel Kurfürst	Czechoslovakia	14.76	
5	1	Wilfried Geeroms	Belgium	15.33	
1	2	Valentin Chistyakov	Soviet Union	14.17	Q
2	2	Lázaro Aristides Betancourt	Cuba	14.54	Q
3	2	Dieter Moll	West Germany	15.01	
4	2	Janusz Wolf	Poland	15.04	
5	2	Georgi Nikolov	Bulgaria	17.2	
1	3	Petar Ermenkov	Bulgaria	14.79	Q
2	3	Wiesław Król	Poland	15.26	Q
3	3	James Adotei	Ghana	15.89	
4	3	Aydin Tunali	Turkey	16.0	
5	3	Katushiro Miyake	Japan	19.0	

=== Final ===
Rank	Athlete	Nationality	Time	Notes
1st place, gold medalist(s)	Valentin Chistyakov	Soviet Union	14.33	
2nd place, silver medalist(s)	Klaus Willimczik	West Germany	14.62	
3rd place, bronze medalist(s)	Wiesław Król	Poland	14.81	
4	Petar Ermenkov	Bulgaria	14.89	
	Lázaro Aristides Betancourt	Cuba	DNF	
	Anatoliy Mikhaylov	Soviet Union	DNF	
