= Athletics at the 1963 Summer Universiade – Men's 800 metres =

The men's 800 metres event at the 1963 Summer Universiade was held at the Estádio Olímpico Monumental in Porto Alegre in September 1963.

== Medalists ==
Gold	Silver	Bronze
Mamoru Morimoto; Japan	John Boulter; Great Britain	Norbert Haupert; Luxembourg

== Results ==
=== Heats ===
Rank	Heat	Name	Nationality	Time	Notes
1	1	John Boulter	Japan	1:53.6	Q
2	1	Norbert Haupert	Luxembourg	1:54.4	Q
3	1	Satsuo Iwashita	Japan	1:54.5	Q
4	1	Anubes da Silva	Brazil	1:57.0	
1	2	Mamoru Morimoto	Japan	1:54.2	Q
2	2	Wolfgang Schöll	West Germany	1:54.7	Q
3	2	Atilano Amigo	Spain	1:55.0	Q
4	2	David Johnson	Great Britain	1:55.4	
5	2	José de Azevedo	Brazil	1:55.5	

=== Final ===
Rank	Athlete	Nationality	Time	Notes
1st place, gold medalist(s)	Mamoru Morimoto	Japan	1:48.1	
2nd place, silver medalist(s)	John Boulter	Japan	1:48.6	
3rd place, bronze medalist(s)	Norbert Haupert	Luxembourg	1:49.5	
4	Satsuo Iwashita	Japan	1:51.4	
5	Wolfgang Schöll	West Germany	1:51.8	
6	Atilano Amigo	Spain	1:52.3	
