= John Metcalf (athlete) =

British hurdler

Personal information
- Nationality: British (English)
- Born: 25 February 1934 (age 92) Norwich, England
- Height: 179 cm (5 ft 10 in)
- Weight: 73 kg (161 lb)

Sport
- Sport: Track and field
- Event: 400 metres hurdles
- Club: Oxford University AC; Achilles Club

John Metcalf (born 25 February 1934) is a British hurdler who competed at the 1960 Summer Olympics.

== Biography ==
Metcalf was educated at the Pembroke College, Oxford and won the Oxford University Sports 100 yards and 220 yards title in 1955.

Metcalf finished third behind Ilie Savel in the 440 yards hurdles event at the 1956 AAA Championships, improved to second place behind Tom Farrell at the 1957 AAA Championships and was third again at the 1958 AAA Championships.

He represented the England athletics team in the 440 yards hurdles at the 1958 British Empire and Commonwealth Games in Cardiff, Wales.

Metcalf once again finished runner-up behind Chris Goudge at the 1959 AAA Championships, but finally won an AAA title by becoming the British 220 yards hurdles champion at the same championships.

At the 1960 Olympic Games in Rome, he represented Great Britain in the men's 400 metres hurdles.
