= Ōgushi =

Ōgushi, Ogushi, Oogushi or Ohgushi (written: 大串) is a Japanese surname. Notable people with the surname include:

- Hiroshi Ogushi (大串 博志, born 1965), Japanese politician
- Keiji Ogushi (大串 啓二, born 1934), Japanese hurdler
