= Lázaro Aristides Betancourt =

Cuban hurdler (1936–2025)

Lázaro Betancourt
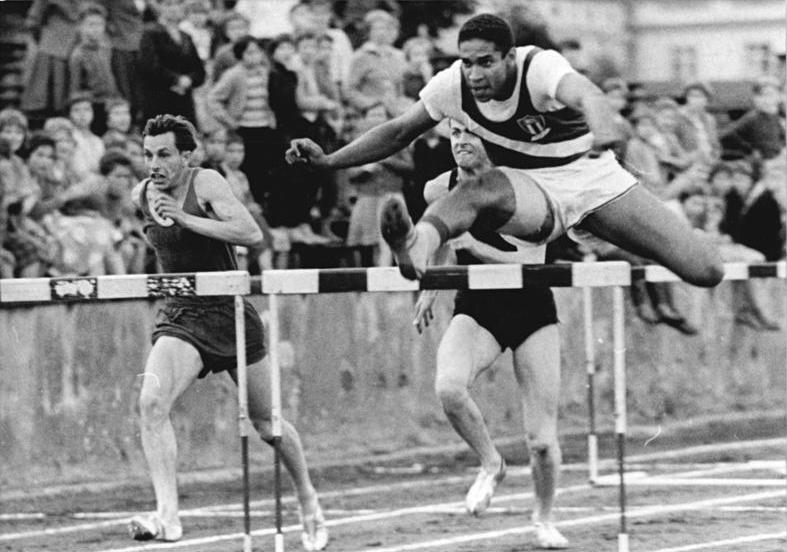
- Betancourt (on the right, jumping) at a hurdle race in East Berlin in 1961

Personal information
- Full name: Lázaro Arístides Betancourt Mella
- Born: 30 July 1936 Matanzas, Cuba
- Died: 19 January 2025 (aged 88)
- Height: 187 cm (6 ft 2 in)
- Weight: 78 kg (172 lb)
Medal record
Men's Athletics
Representing Cuba
Ibero-American Games
Gold medal – first place	1960 Santiago	110 m hurdles
Central American and Caribbean Games
Gold medal – first place	1962 Kingston	110 m hurdles
Pan American Games
Bronze medal – third place	1963 São Paulo	110 m hurdles

Lázaro Arístides Betancourt Mella (30 July 1936 – 19 January 2025) was a Cuban hurdler who competed in the 1964 Summer Olympics. He was third in the 1963 Pan American Games 110 metres hurdles. In the 1959 Pan American Games 110 metres hurdles he finished fifth.

Betancourt died on 19 January 2025, at the age of 88.

== International competitions ==
Year	Competition	Venue	Position	Event	Notes
Representing Cuba
1959	Pan American Games	Chicago, United States	22nd (h)	100 m	11.0
1959	Pan American Games	Chicago, United States	5th	110 m hurdles	14.6
1959	Pan American Games	Chicago, United States	5th (h)	4 × 100 m relay	42.5
1960	Ibero-American Games	Santiago, Chile	1st	110 m hurdles	14.3
1961	Universiade	Sofia, Bulgaria	3rd (h)	110 m hurdles	14.54^{1}
1962	Central American and Caribbean Games	Kingston, Jamaica	1st	110 m hurdles	14.2
1962	Central American and Caribbean Games	Kingston, Jamaica	3rd (h)	4 × 100 m relay	40.6
1963	Pan American Games	São Paulo, Brazil	3rd	110 m hurdles	14.3
1963	Pan American Games	São Paulo, Brazil	6th	4 × 100 m relay	42.60
1963	Universiade	Porto Alegre, Brazil	7th (h)	110 m hurdles	14.73
1963	Universiade	Porto Alegre, Brazil	2nd	4 × 100 m relay	41.37
1964	Olympic Games	Tokyo, Japan	11th (sf)	110 m hurdles	14.23
1966	Central American and Caribbean Games	San Juan, Puerto Rico	4th	110 m hurdles	14.5 (w)
1967	Central American and Caribbean Championships	Xalapa, Mexico	2nd	110 m hurdles	14.7
1967	Central American and Caribbean Championships	Xalapa, Mexico	1st	4 × 100 m relay	40.3

^{1}Did not finish in the final
