= Athletics at the 1963 Pan American Games – Men's 110 metres hurdles =

Men's 110 metres hurdles at the Pan American Games

The men's 110 metres hurdles event at the 1963 Pan American Games was held at the Pacaembu Stadium in São Paulo on 28 April and 3 May.

== Medalists ==
Gold	Silver	Bronze
Blaine Lindgren; United States	Willie May; United States	Lázaro Betancourt; Cuba

== Results ==
=== Heats ===
Rank	Heat	Name	Nationality	Time	Notes
1	2	Blaine Lindgren	United States	14.11	Q
2	1	Willie May	United States	14.28	Q
3	1	Lázaro Betancourt	Cuba	14.32	Q
4	2	Heriberto Cruz	Puerto Rico	14.34	Q
5	2	Carlos Mossa	Brazil	14.41	Q
6	2	Bill Gairdner	Canada	14.51	
7	1	José da Conceição	Brazil	14.61	Q
8	1	Juan Carlos Dyrzka	Argentina	14.93	
	1	José Cavero	Peru	DNS	
	2	Luiz Alzamora	Peru	DNS	

=== Final ===
Rank	Name	Nationality	Time	Notes
1st place, gold medalist(s)	Blaine Lindgren	United States	13.8	
2nd place, silver medalist(s)	Willie May	United States	14.0	
3rd place, bronze medalist(s)	Lázaro Betancourt	Cuba	14.3	
4	Heriberto Cruz	Puerto Rico	14.7	
5	Carlos Mossa	Brazil	16.5	
	José da Conceição	Brazil	DNS	
