= Athletics at the 1957 World University Games – Men's 400 metres hurdles =

The men's 400 metres hurdles event at the 1957 World University Games was held at the Stadium Charlety in Paris on 6 and 7 September 1957.

== Medalists ==
Gold	Silver	Bronze
Igor Ilyin; Soviet Union	Anubes da Silva; Brazil	Keiji Ogushi; Japan

== Results ==
=== Heats ===
Rank	Heat	Athlete	Nationality	Time	Notes
1	1	Igor Ilyin	Soviet Union	53.8	Q
2	1	Anubes da Silva	Brazil	55.9	Q
3	1	Henryk Chojecki	Poland	56.4	Q
4	1	Dimitar Dimitrov	Bulgaria	56.4	
5	1	Martin	France	57.2	
6	1	José Luis Bustinza	Spain	59.3	
1	2	Jean-Marie Kling	France	54.4	Q
2	2	Helmut Joho	West Germany	55.0	Q
3	2	Keiji Ogushi	Japan	55.0	Q
4	2	Jacques Vanden Abeele	Belgium	58.9	
5	2	Germano Gimelli	Italy	1:01.2	
	2	Alexander Hannah	Great Britain	DQ	

=== Final ===
Rank	Name	Nationality	Time	Notes
1st place, gold medalist(s)	Igor Ilyin	Soviet Union	53.3	
2nd place, silver medalist(s)	Anubes da Silva	Brazil	53.6	
3rd place, bronze medalist(s)	Keiji Ogushi	Japan	54.1	
4	Helmut Joho	West Germany	54.2	
5	Jean-Marie Kling	France	54.2	
6	Henryk Chojecki	Poland	57.6	
