= Athletics at the 1963 Summer Universiade – Men's 100 metres =

The men's 100 metres event at the 1963 Summer Universiade was held at the Estádio Olímpico Monumental in Porto Alegre with the final on 5 September 1963.

== Medalists ==
Gold	Silver	Bronze
Enrique Figuerola; Cuba	Edvins Ozolins; Soviet Union	Livio Berruti; Italy

== Results ==
=== Heats ===
Rank	Heat	Name	Nationality	Time	Notes
1	1	Enrique Figuerola	Cuba	10.6	Q
2	1	Roberto Alvarado	Peru	10.8	Q
3	1	Gérard Zingg	France	10.9	Q
4	1	Gil'ad Weingarten	Israel	10.9	
1	2	Edvins Ozolins	Soviet Union	10.7	Q
2	2	Jean-Pierre Fabre	France	10.8	Q
3	2	José Luis Sánchez	Spain	10.8	Q
4	2	Fritz Obersiebrasse	West Germany	10.8	
5	2	Javier Sanguinetti	Peru	10.8	
1	3	Dick Steane	Great Britain	10.6	Q
2	3	Toru Honda	Japan	10.7	Q
3	3	Csaba Csutorás	Hungary	10.8	Q
4	3	Jürgen Schüttler	West Germany	10.9	
5	3	Murilo Muradas	Brazil	11.6	
1	4	Livio Berruti	Italy	10.7	Q
2	4	László Mihályfi	Hungary	10.8	Q
3	4	Jorge Soares	Portugal	10.9	Q
4	4	George Cmela	Great Britain	10.9	
5	4	Antônio Alves	Brazil	11.0	

=== Semifinals ===
Rank	Heat	Name	Nationality	Time	Notes
1	1	Enrique Figuerola	Cuba	10.73	Q
2	1	Edvins Ozolins	Soviet Union	10.78	Q
3	1	Jean-Pierre Fabre	France	10.86	Q
4	1	Gérard Zingg	France	10.87	
5	1	José Luis Sánchez	Spain	10.90	
6	1	Roberto Alvarado	Peru	11.10	
1	2	Livio Berruti	Italy	10.52	Q
2	2	Dick Steane	Great Britain	10.65	Q
3	2	Toru Honda	Japan	10.66	Q
4	2	Csaba Csutorás	Hungary	10.70	
5	2	László Mihályfi	Hungary	10.85	
6	2	Jorge Soares	Portugal	10.9	

=== Final ===
Rank	Athlete	Nationality	Time	Notes
1st place, gold medalist(s)	Enrique Figuerola	Cuba	10.34	
2nd place, silver medalist(s)	Edvins Ozolins	Soviet Union	10.52	
3rd place, bronze medalist(s)	Livio Berruti	Italy	10.56	
4	Dick Steane	Great Britain	10.59	
5	Toru Honda	Japan	10.90	
6	Jean-Pierre Fabre	France	10.9	
