= Bogusław Gierajewski =

Polish sprinter (1937–2025)

Personal information
- Nationality: Polish
- Born: 4 July 1937 Warsaw, Poland
- Died: 14 March 2025 (aged 87)
- Height: 1.78 m (5 ft 10 in)
- Weight: 80 kg (176 lb)

Sport
- Sport: Sprinting
- Events: 400 metres, 400 metres hurdles
- Club: AZS Warsaw

Bogusław Gierajewski (4 June 1937 – 14 March 2025) was a Polish sprinter. He competed in the men's 4 × 400 metres relay at the 1960 Summer Olympics. He also participated in the 1959 Summer Universiade and the 1961 Summer Universiade. During his career, he won four gold medals in the Polish Championships.

Gierajewski died on 14 March 2025, at the age of 87.

== International competitions ==
Year	Competition	Venue	Position	Event	Notes
Representing Poland
1959	Universiade	Turin, Italy	14th (sf)	100 m	11.1
1959	Universiade	Turin, Italy	5th	4 × 100 m relay	42.0
1959	Universiade	Turin, Italy	4th	4 × 400 m relay	3:12.8
1960	Olympic Games	Rome, Italy	10th (h)	4 × 400 m relay	3:10.88
1961	Universiade	Sofia, Bulgaria	8th (sf)	200 m	21.7
1961	Universiade	Sofia, Bulgaria	5th	400 m	48.74
1961	Universiade	Sofia, Bulgaria	6th	4 × 100 m relay	41.9
1961	Universiade	Sofia, Bulgaria	4th	4 × 400 m relay	3:16.76
1964	Olympic Games	Tokyo, Japan	23rd (h)	400 m hurdles	52.8

== Personal bests ==
- 100 metres – 10.6h (Warsaw 1961)
- 200 metres – 21.3h (Warsaw 1962)
- 400 metres – 47.2h (Łódź 1964)
- 400 metres hurdles – 51.1h (Cologne 1964)
- 400 metres hurdles – 51.43 (London 1964)
