= Athletics at the 1959 Summer Universiade – Men's 400 metres hurdles =

The men's 400 metres hurdles event at the 1959 Summer Universiade was held at the Stadio Comunale di Torino in Turin on 4 and 6 September 1959.

== Medalists ==
Gold	Silver	Bronze
Salvatore Morale; Italy	Germano Gimelli; Italy	Wiesław Król; Poland

== Results ==
=== Heats ===
Rank	Heat	Athlete	Nationality	Time	Notes
1	1	Germano Gimelli	Italy	53.5	Q
2	1	Paul Haennig	France	53.7	Q
3	1	Mike Robinson	Great Britain	53.8	
4	1	Jacques Pennewaert	Belgium	55.1	
5	1	Mongi Soussi Zarrouki	Tunisia	55.2	
6	1	Costa Martins	Portugal	57.1	
1	2	Salvatore Morale	Italy	52.2	Q
2	2	Wiesław Król	Poland	53.5	Q
3	2	Aimo Kuukka	Finland	54.5	
4	2	Francisco Sáinz	Spain	55.3	
5	2	Alexandros Froussios	Greece	55.8	
6	2	Michel Tawil	Lebanon	59.0	
1	3	Jean-Marie Kling	France	54.1	Q
2	3	Dimitrios Skourtis	Greece	54.5	Q
3	3	Albert Grawitz	West Germany	54.7	
4	3	Per-Olof Swartz	Sweden	54.8	
5	3	Bernardino Lombao	Spain	54.8	

=== Final ===
Rank	Name	Nationality	Time	Notes
1st place, gold medalist(s)	Salvatore Morale	Italy	52.1	
2nd place, silver medalist(s)	Germano Gimelli	Italy	52.8	
3rd place, bronze medalist(s)	Wiesław Król	Poland	53.2	
4	Paul Haennig	France	53.8	
5	Jean-Marie Kling	France	54.5	
6	Dimitrios Skourtis	Greece	55.6	
