= Athletics at the 1964 Summer Olympics – Men's 110 metres hurdles =

Men's 110 metres hurdles at the Games of the XVIII Olympiad
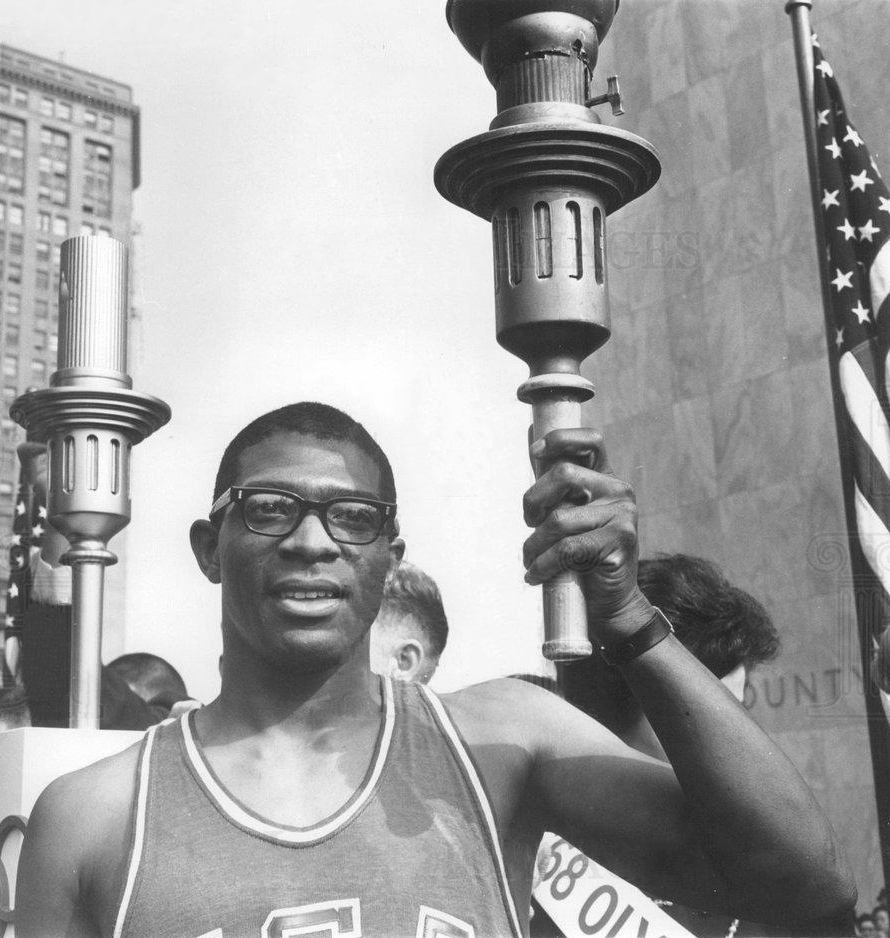
- Hayes Jones in 1963
- Venue: Olympic Stadium
- Dates: 17–18 October 1964
- Competitors: 37 from 23 nations
- Winning time: 13.6

Medalists
1st place, gold medalist(s)		Hayes Jones; United States
2nd place, silver medalist(s)		Harold Blaine Lindgren; United States
3rd place, bronze medalist(s)		Anatoly Mikhailov; Soviet Union

The men's 110 metres hurdles was the shorter of the men's hurdle races in the Athletics at the 1964 Summer Olympics program in Tokyo. It was held on 17 October and 18 October 1964. 38 athletes from 24 nations entered, with 1 not starting in the first round. The maximum number of athletes per nation had been set at 3 since the 1930 Olympic Congress. The first round was held on 17 October, with the semifinals and the final on 18 October. The event was won by Hayes Jones of the United States, the nation's seventh of nine consecutive victories and the 13th overall gold medal in the event for the Americans. Jones was the fifth man to win two medals in the event. For the first time since 1936, an athlete from outside the United States made the podium, as Anatoly Mikhailov of the Soviet Union took bronze to break the American streak of four consecutive podium sweeps and earn the first Soviet medal in the event.

== Background ==
This was the 15th appearance of the event, which is one of 12 athletics events to have been held at every Summer Olympics. Two finalists from 1960 returned: bronze medalist Hayes Jones of the United States and sixth-place finisher Valentin Chistyakov of the Soviet Union. Jones and his countryman Blaine Lindgren were favored, with Willie Davenport giving the American team a solid chance at a fifth consecutive medal sweep.

The Ivory Coast, Malaysia, and Northern Rhodesia each made their first appearance in the event. The United States made its 15th appearance, the only nation to have competed in the 110 metres hurdles in each Games to that point.

== Competition format ==
After one edition at four rounds in 1960, the format returned to the three-round format used since 1908. The semifinals and finals were expanded from 6 runners each to 8 runners each, however; in fact, the reduction in number of rounds was despite there being more hurdlers in 1964 than 1960. The 1964 competition also introduced the "fastest loser" system, used only in the first round at this edition. Previously, advancement depended solely on the runners' place in their heat. The 1964 competition added advancement places to the fastest runners across the heats in the semifinals who did not advance based on place.

The first round consisted of five heats, with 7 or 8 hurdlers each. The top three hurdlers in each heat, along with the next fastest overall, advanced to the semifinals. The 16 semifinalists were divided into two semifinals of 8 hurdlers each; the top four hurdlers in each advanced to the 8-man final.

== Records ==
These were the standing world and Olympic records (in seconds) prior to the 1964 Summer Olympics.

World record	Martin Lauer (FRG)	13.2	Zürich, Switzerland	7 July 1959
Olympic record	Lee Calhoun (USA)	13.5	Melbourne, Australia	28 November 1956

No new world or Olympic records were set during the competition.

== Schedule ==
All times are Japan Standard Time (UTC+9)

Date	Time	Round
Saturday, 17 October 1964	14:00	Round 1
Sunday, 18 October 1964	14:00; 15:50	Semifinals; Final

== Results ==
=== Round 1 ===
The top three runners in each of the 5 heats as well as the fastest remaining runner advanced.

==== Heat 1 ====
Rank	Lane	Athlete	Nation	Time (hand)	Time (auto)	Notes
1	5	Giorgio Mazza	Italy	14.2	14.26	Q
2	7	Willie Davenport	United States	14.2	14.44	Q
3	6	Yasuda Hirokazu	Japan	14.5	14.53	Q
4	2	Folu Erinkle	Nigeria	14.5	14.57	
5	4	Aggrey Sheroy Awori	Uganda	14.6	14.68	
6	1	Arnaldo Bristol	Puerto Rico	14.6	14.69	
7	3	Wallie Babb	Northern Rhodesia	14.7	14.80	
				Wind: -1.7 m/s		

==== Heat 2 ====
Rank	Lane	Athlete	Nation	Time (hand)	Time (auto)	Notes
1	2	Harold Blaine Lindgren	United States	14.2	14.20	Q
2	5	Alexandr Kontarev	Soviet Union	14.2	14.26	Q
3	7	Heinrich John	United Team of Germany	14.3	14.39	Q
4	6	Laurie Taitt	Great Britain	14.5	14.52	
5	8	Ghulam Raziq	Pakistan	14.7	14.76	
6	4	Heriberto Cruz	Puerto Rico	14.9	14.93	
7	1	Juan Carlos Dyrzka	Argentina	15.2	—	
8	3	Simbara Maki	Ivory Coast	15.3	—	
				Wind: -0.4 m/s		

==== Heat 3 ====
Rank	Lane	Athlete	Nation	Time (hand)	Time (auto)	Notes
1	3	Anatoly Mikhailov	Soviet Union	14.2	14.13	Q
2	2	Giovanni Cornacchia	Italy	14.2	14.25	Q
3	6	Bo Erik Forssander	Sweden	14.3	14.35	Q
4	5	Cliff Nuttall	Canada	14.8	14.82	
5	4	Bernard Fournet	France	14.8	14.82	
6	1	Cetin Sahiner	Turkey	15.1	15.12	
7	7	Virgil Okiring	Uganda	15.5	—	
—	8	Lin Kuei Chang	Taiwan	DNS		
				Wind: +0.6 m/s		

==== Heat 4 ====
Rank	Lane	Athlete	Nation	Time (hand)	Time (auto)	Notes
1	2	Edy Ottoz	Italy	14.6	14.63	Q
2	1	Lázaro Aristides Betancourt	Cuba	14.6	14.67	Q
3	8	Valentin Chistiakov	Soviet Union	14.7	14.75	Q
4	3	Leopold Marien	Belgium	14.9	14.93	
5	4	Georges Marsellos	Greece	14.9	14.97	
6	6	Kuda Ditta	Malaysia	15.1	15.17	
7	5	Christian Voigt	United Team of Germany	15.1	15.19	
8	7	Samir Ambrose Vincent	Iraq	16.2	—	
				Wind: -2.1 m/s		

==== Heat 5 ====
Rank	Lane	Athlete	Nation	Time (hand)	Time (auto)	Notes
1	5	Marcel Duriez	France	14.2	14.22	Q
2	1	Hayes Jones	United States	14.2	14.24	Q
3	6	John Michael Parker	Great Britain	14.2	14.26	Q
4	7	Gurbachan Singh Randhawa	India	14.3	14.37	q
5	3	Werner Trzmiel	United Team of Germany	14.3	14.38	
6	2	Akira Tanaka	Japan	14.5	14.58	
7	4	Edward Akika	Nigeria	14.7	14.70	
				Wind: -1.8 m/s		

=== Semifinals ===
The top four runners in each semifinal advanced to the final.

==== Semifinal 1 ====
Davenport injured his thigh and finished seventh, ensuring that the streak of American podium sweeps would end at 4.

Rank	Lane	Athlete	Nation	Time (hand)	Time (auto)	Notes
1	4	Anatoly Mikhailov	Soviet Union	13.9	13.90	Q
2	2	Gurbachan Singh Randhawa	India	14.0	14.04	Q
3	6	Giorgio Mazza	Italy	14.0	14.06	Q
4	1	Marcel Duriez	France	14.0	14.10	Q
5	8	Heinrich John	United Team of Germany	14.1	14.14	
6	7	Lazaro Betancourt	Cuba	14.2	14.23	
7	3	Willie Davenport	United States	14.2	14.28	
—	5	Valentin Christiakov	Soviet Union	DSQ		
				Wind: +2.7 m/s		

==== Semifinal 2 ====
Rank	Lane	Athlete	Nation	Time (hand)	Time (auto)	Notes
1	8	Harold Blaine Lindgren	United States	13.9	13.95	Q
2	1	Giovanni Cornacchia	Italy	14.0	14.06	Q
3	6	Hayes Jones	United States	14.0	14.06	Q
4	5	Edy Ottoz	Italy	14.1	14.12	Q
5	4	Bo Erik Forssand	Sweden	14.2	14.21	
6	2	Alexandr Kontarev	Soviet Union	14.2	14.27	
7	3	Yasuda Hirokazu	Japan	14.3	14.30	
8	7	John Michael Parker	Great Britain	14.6	14.65	
				Wind: +0.3 m/s		

=== Final ===
Rank	Lane	Athlete	Nation	Time (hand)	Time (auto)
1st place, gold medalist(s)	6	Hayes Jones	United States	13.6	13.67
2nd place, silver medalist(s)	1	Blaine Lindgren	United States	13.7	13.74
3rd place, bronze medalist(s)	8	Anatoly Mikhailov	Soviet Union	13.7	13.78
4	3	Eddy Ottoz	Italy	13.8	13.84
5	4	Gurbachan Singh Randhawa	India	14.0	14.09
6	5	Marcel Duriez	France	14.0	14.09
7	7	Giovanni Cornacchia	Italy	14.1	14.12
8	2	Giorgio Mazza	Italy	14.1	14.17
				Wind: +2.0 m/s	
