= Enrique Figuerola =

Cuban sprinter (born 1938)

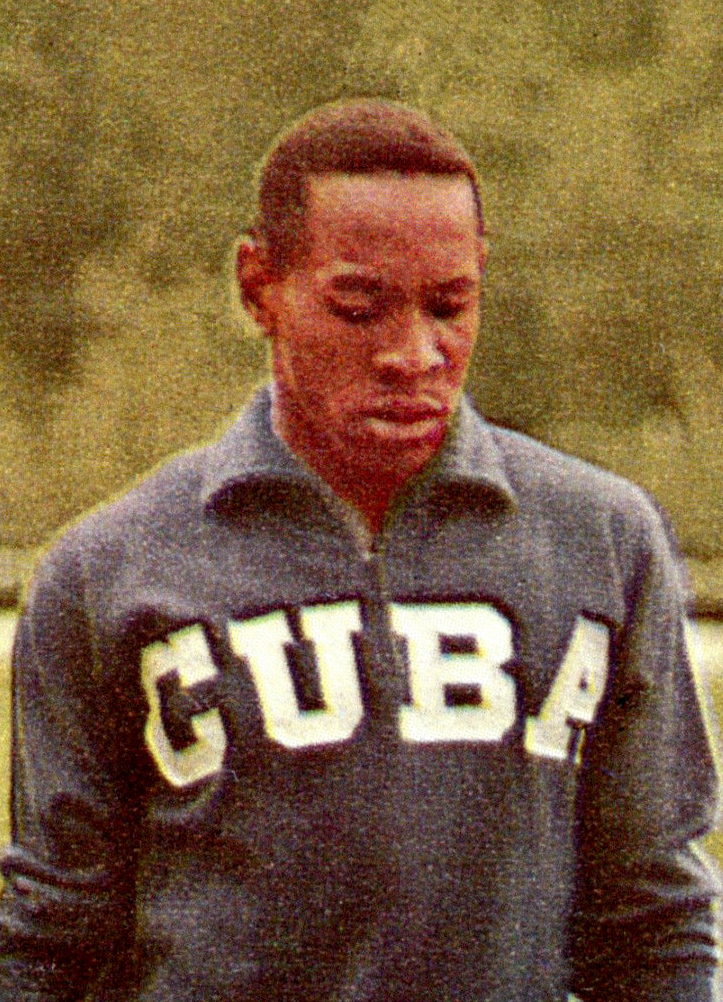
- Figuerola in 1967

Personal information
- Full name: Enrique Figuerola Camue
- Born: 15 July 1938 (age 87) Santiago de Cuba, Cuba
- Height: 167 cm (5 ft 6 in)
- Weight: 67 kg (148 lb)

Sport
- Sport: Athletics
- Event: Sprints
Medal record
Men's athletics
Representing Cuba
Olympic Games
Silver medal – second place	1964 Tokyo	100 m
Silver medal – second place	1968 Mexico City	4×100 m relay
Pan American Games
Gold medal – first place	1963 São Paulo	100 m
Central American and Caribbean Games
Gold medal – first place	1966 San Juan	100 m
Summer Universiade
Gold medal – first place	1961 Sofia	100 m
Gold medal – first place	1963 Porto Alegre	100 m

Enrique Figuerola Camue (Note: In this Spanish name, the first or paternal surname is Figuerola and the second or maternal family name is Camue.) (born 15 July 1938) is a retired Cuban sprinter who competed at three Olympic Games.

== Biography ==
Figuerola made his first appearance at the 1960 Summer Olympics in Rome, where he finished fourth in the 100 metres final. Figuerola won the British AAA Championships title in the 100 yards event at the 1964 AAA Championships at White City Stadium in London.

Later that year, at the 1964 Summer Olympics in Tokyo, Figuerola won the silver medal in the 100 metres, behind American Robert Hayes (gold) and ahead of Canadian Harry Jerome (bronze).

Figuerola returned the following year to London to repeat his 100 yards success at the 1965 AAA Championships.

Three years later at a third Olympic Games at the 1968 Summer Olympics in Mexico, he won another silver medal, in the 4 × 100 metres relay this time, together with his teammates Hermes Ramirez, Juan Morales and Pablo Montes, behind the US team (gold) and ahead of France (bronze).

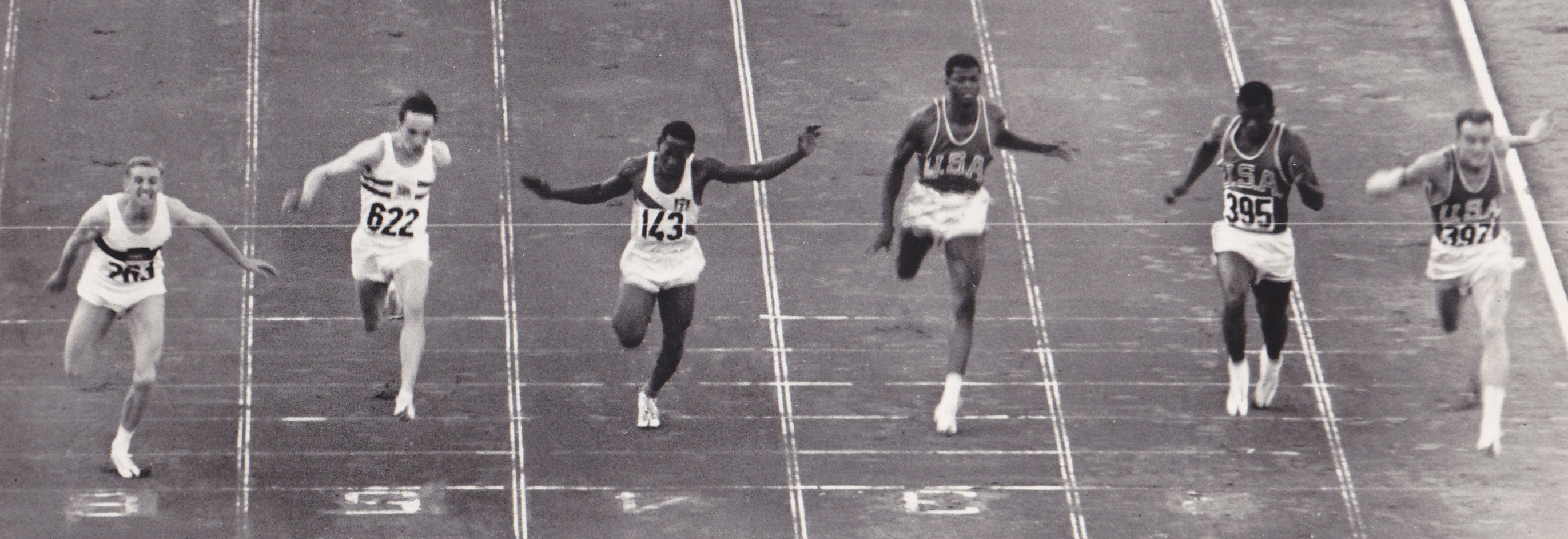
1960 Olympics, 100 m final, Figuerola is 3rd from left

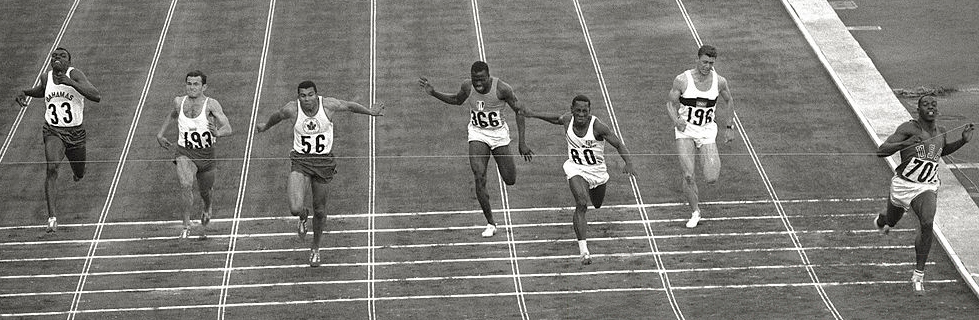
1964 Olympics, 100 m final, Figuerola is 3rd from right

== International competitions ==
Year	Competition	Venue	Position	Event	Notes
Representing Cuba
1959	Pan American Games	Chicago, United States	3rd	100 m	10.5
1959	Pan American Games	Chicago, United States	15th (h)	200 m	22.2
1959	Pan American Games	Chicago, United States	6th (h)	4 × 100 m relay	42.5
1960	Olympic Games	Rome, Italy	4th	100 m	10.3
1960	Ibero-American Games	Santiago, Chile	2nd (sf)	100 m	10.5^{1}
1961	Universiade	Sofia, Bulgaria	1st	100 m	10.38
1961	Universiade	Sofia, Bulgaria	10th (h)	200 m	22.0^{1}
1961	Universiade	Sofia, Bulgaria	7th (h)	4 × 100 m relay	42.4
1962	Central American and Caribbean Games	Kingston, Jamaica	4th	100 m	10.5
1962	Central American and Caribbean Games	Kingston, Jamaica	4th	200 m	21.6
1962	Central American and Caribbean Games	Kingston, Jamaica	3rd (h)	4 × 100 m relay	40.6
1963	Pan American Games	São Paulo, Brazil	1st	100 m	10.46
1963	Pan American Games	São Paulo, Brazil	6th	4 × 100 m relay	42.60
1963	Universiade	Porto Alegre, Brazil	1st	100 m	10.34
1963	Universiade	Porto Alegre, Brazil	2nd	4 × 100 m relay	41.37
1964	Olympic Games	Tokyo, Japan	2nd	100 m	10.2
1965	Universiade	Budapest, Hungary	8th (h)	100 m	10.7^{2}
1966	Central American and Caribbean Games	San Juan, Puerto Rico	1st	100 m	10.2
1966	Central American and Caribbean Games	San Juan, Puerto Rico	3rd	200 m	21.5
1966	Central American and Caribbean Games	San Juan, Puerto Rico	3rd	4 × 100 m relay	40.6
1967	Pan American Games	Winnipeg, Canada	–	100 m	DNF
1968	Olympic Games	Mexico City, Mexico	8th (sf)	100 m	10.23
1968	Olympic Games	Mexico City, Mexico	2nd	4 × 100 m relay	38.40

^{1}Did not start in the final
^{2}Did not start in the semifinals

== Personal bests ==
- 100 metres – 10.23 (Mexico City 1968)
