= Wallie Babb =

Zambian athlete (1940–1999)

Personal information
- Nationality: Northern Rhodesian
- Born: 3 December 1940 Kitwe, Northern Rhodesia
- Died: 1999 (aged 58–59)

Sport
- Sport: Track and field
- Event: 110 metres hurdles

Walter Deville N. Babb (3 December 1940 – 1999) was a hurdler who represented Northern Rhodesia. He competed in the men's 110 metres hurdles at the 1964 Summer Olympics.
