= Cliff Nuttall =

Canadian hurdler

Personal information
- Nationality: Canadian
- Born: 31 December 1940 (age 85)

Sport
- Sport: Track and field
- Event: 110 metres hurdles

Cliff Nuttall (born 31 December 1940) is a Canadian hurdler. He competed in the men's 110 metres hurdles at the 1964 Summer Olympics.
