= Athletics at the 1963 Pan American Games – Men's 4 × 100 metres relay =

Men's 4 × 100 metres relay at the Pan American Games

The men's 4 × 100 metres relay event at the 1963 Pan American Games was held at the Pacaembu Stadium in São Paulo on 4 May 1963.

== Results ==
Rank	Nation	Athletes	Time	Notes
1st place, gold medalist(s)	United States	Earl Young, Ollan Cassell, Brooks Johnson, Ira Murchison	40.40	
2nd place, silver medalist(s)	Venezuela	Héctor Thomas, Horacio Esteves, Arquímides Herrera, Rafael Romero	40.71	
3rd place, bronze medalist(s)	Trinidad and Tobago	Clifton Bertrand, Anthony Jones, Irving Joseph, Cipriani Phillip	40.87	
4	Brazil	Antonio Alves, Joel da Costa, Affonso da Silva, Joe Satow	41.23	
5	Puerto Rico	Heriberto Cruz, Jorge Derieux, Juan Montes, Manuel Rivera	42.02	
6	Cuba	Victor Hernández, Lázaro Betancourt, Jorge Cumberbach, Enrique Figuerola	42.60	
