= Max Boyes =

British hurdler (1934–2022)

Personal information
- Nationality: British (English)
- Born: 6 May 1934 Lincoln, Lincolnshire, England
- Died: 2 May 2022 (aged 87)
- Height: 178 cm (5 ft 10 in)
- Weight: 67 kg (148 lb)

Sport
- Sport: Track and field
- Event: 400 metres hurdles
- Club: Royal Navy AC

Max Boyes (6 May 1934 – 2 May 2022) was a British hurdler who competed at the 1960 Summer Olympics.

== Biography ==
Boyes was educated at the Horncastle Grammar School in Lincolnshire, where he played cricket and football. After leaving school he joined the Royal Navy as a radio electrician.

In 1954 while stationed in Australia he won the Australian Services 440 yards championship and also won the Royal Navy championship five times between 1953 and 1959. Further success came when he won the 1958 Navy 440 yards hurdles title, Hampshire title in 1956, 1957 and 1958 and the Combined Services 440 yards title in 1959.

Boyes became the British 440 yards hurdles champion after winning the British AAA Championships title at the 1960 AAA Championships.

later that year at the 1960 Olympic Games in Rome, he represented Great Britain in the men's 400 metres hurdles.
