= Alexandr Kontarev =

Personal information
- Nationality: Soviet
- Born: 18 May 1938 (age 88) Rostov-on-Don, Russian SFSR, Soviet Union

Sport
- Sport: Track and field
- Event: 110 metres hurdles

Alexandr Kontarev (born 18 May 1938) is a Soviet hurdler. He competed in the men's 110 metres hurdles at the 1964 Summer Olympics.
