= János Pintér =

Hungarian long-distance runner (1936–2021)

Personal information
- Born: 28 November 1936 Budapest, Hungary
- Died: 14 September 2021 (aged 84) Budapest, Hungary

Sport
- Sport: sport
Medal record
Representing Hungary
Summer Universiade
Gold medal – first place	1961 Sofia	5000m

János Pintér (28 November 1936 – 14 September 2021) was a Hungarian long-distance runner who competed in the 1964 Summer Olympics. Pintér was born in Budapest on 28 November 1936. He died on 14 September 2021, at the age of 84.
