= Hayes Jones =

American athlete (born 1938)

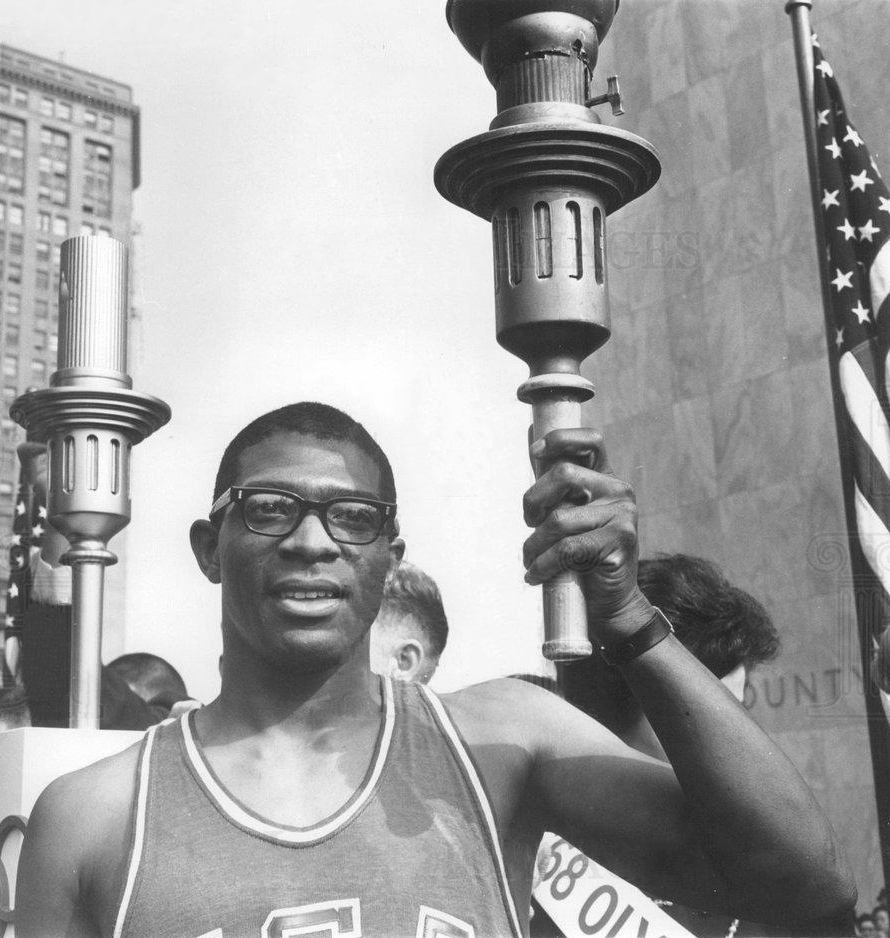
- Jones in 1963

Personal information
- Full name: Hayes Wendell Jones
- Born: August 4, 1938 (age 88) Starkville, Mississippi, U.S.
- Height: 5 ft 11 in (180 cm)
- Weight: 168 lb (76 kg)

Sport
- Sport: Athletics
- Events: Sprint, hurdles, high jump, long jump
- Club: Detroit Varsity Club

Achievements and titles
- Personal bests: 100 yd – 9.4 (1957); 220yd – 20.9 (1959); 110 mH – 13.4 (1962); HJ – 1.93 m (1957); LJ – 7.31 m (1957)
Medal record
Men's athletics
Representing the United States
Olympic Games
Gold medal – first place	1964 Tokyo	110 m hurdles
Bronze medal – third place	1960 Rome	110 m hurdles
Pan American Games
Gold medal – first place	1959 Chicago	110 m hurdles

Hayes Wendell Jones (born August 4, 1938) is an American former athlete, winner of the 110 m hurdles event at the 1964 Summer Olympics. He was born in Starkville, Mississippi.

Jones first major title was the 120 yd (110 m) hurdles at the 1958 AAU championships. He won four more AAU titles: 1960 and 1964 in 110 m hurdles and 1961 and 1963 in 120 yd (110 m) hurdles.

In 1959, Jones, as an Eastern Michigan University representative, won the NCAA titles in 120 yd (110 m) and 220 yd (200 m) hurdles, following his first major international experience, when he won the 110 m hurdles at the Pan American Games.

A year later, at the Rome Olympics he was third behind teammates Lee Calhoun and Willie May, after which many observers believed he had reached his peak performance. But he returned to the 1964 Olympic Games in Tokyo, where he won the gold medal and his teammate Blaine Lindgren won the silver. Jones also ran on a 4 × 100 m relay team that set a world record in 1961.

After retiring from competition, Jones became New York City's director of recreation in 1967. He has worked for American Airlines and owned his own baggage check-in service at Detroit Metropolitan Airport.

== Politics ==
From January 2005 through March 2006, Jones served as the director of the Oakland County Department of Economic Development & Community Affairs. In 2006 he resigned as director to run to represent the 29th district in the Michigan House of Representatives to finish the term vacated by newly elected Pontiac Mayor Clarence Phillips and to win a full two-year term starting in January 2007. Jones was on the primary ballot twice; the first to finish the term left vacant by Phillips, and second, to be the Democratic candidate for the full two-year term in the general election. Oddly Jones won the right to be the Democratic candidate for the remainder of the two months left on Phillips' term while Tim Melton will be the Democratic candidate for the full two-year term. Jones was sworn in to his very brief tenure as a state representative on November 28.

On July 1, 2007, Jones assumed the position of General Manager of SMART (Suburban Mobility Authority for Regional Transportation), the public transit operator serving suburban Detroit, Michigan.

== Personal life ==
In 2003 Jones married Rhonda, they live in Pontiac. Jones has two children and three grandchildren.
