= Willi Matthias =

German hurdler

Personal information
- Nationality: German
- Born: 26 April 1936 (age 90)

Sport
- Sport: Track and field
- Event: 400 metres hurdles

Willi Matthias (born 26 April 1936) is a German hurdler. He competed in the men's 400 metres hurdles at the 1960 Summer Olympics.
