= Athletics at the 1957 World University Games – Men's 110 metres hurdles =

The men's 110 metres hurdles event at the 1957 World University Games was held at the Stadium Charlety in Paris on 7 and 8 September 1957.

== Medalists ==
| Gold | Silver | Bronze |
|---|---|---|
| Stanko Lorger; Yugoslavia | Georgi Kaburov; Bulgaria | Milad Petrušić; Yugoslavia |

== Results ==
=== Heats ===
| Rank | Heat | Athlete | Nationality | Time | Notes |
|---|---|---|---|---|---|
| 1 | 1 | Stanko Lorger | Yugoslavia | 14.8 | Q |
| 2 | 1 | Georgi Kaburov | Bulgaria | 14.9 | Q |
| 3 | 1 | Wiesław Król | Poland | 15.0 | Q |
| 4 | 1 | Jean-Claude Bernard | France | 15.4 | |
| 5 | 1 | Rúbens Habesh | Brazil | 15.7 | |
| 6 | 1 | Michael Stokely | Great Britain | 16.6 | |
| 1 | 2 | Yuriy Petrov | Soviet Union | 15.3 | Q |
| 2 | 2 | Jean-Claude Reynaud | France | 15.4 | Q |
| 3 | 2 | Vic Matthews | Great Britain | 15.4 | Q |
| 4 | 2 | Dieter Moll | West Germany | 15.7 | |
| 5 | 2 | Valerio Colatore | Italy | 15.8 | |
| 6 | 2 | Gutenkauf | Luxembourg | 16.0 | |
| 1 | 3 | Milad Petrušić | Yugoslavia | 15.0 | Q |
| 2 | 3 | Imre Retezár | Hungary | 15.2 | Q |
| 3 | 3 | Ian Malcolm | Great Britain | 15.8 | Q |
| 4 | 3 | Mieczysław Kolejwa | Poland | 16.0 | |
| 1 | 4 | Michel Chardel | France | 15.1 | Q |
| 2 | 4 | John Duncan | Nigeria | 15.2 | Q |
| 3 | 4 | Ivan Veselský | Czechoslovakia | 15.2 | Q |
| 4 | 4 | Tiberiu Ardeleanu | Romania | 15.2 | |

=== Semifinals ===
| Rank | Heat | Athlete | Nationality | Time | Notes |
|---|---|---|---|---|---|
| 1 | 1 | Stanko Lorger | Yugoslavia | 15.2 | Q |
| 2 | 1 | Ivan Veselský | Czechoslovakia | 15.2 | Q |
| 3 | 1 | Imre Retezár | Hungary | 15.3 | Q |
| 4 | 1 | Ian Malcolm | Great Britain | 15.3 | |
| 5 | 1 | Yuriy Petrov | Soviet Union | 15.3 | |
| 6 | 1 | Michel Chardel | France | 15.8 | |
| 1 | 2 | Milad Petrušić | Yugoslavia | 15.0 | Q |
| 2 | 2 | Georgi Kaburov | Bulgaria | 15.1 | Q |
| 3 | 2 | Jean-Claude Reynaud | France | 15.1 | Q |
| 4 | 2 | Wiesław Król | Poland | 15.3 | |
| 5 | 2 | John Duncan | Nigeria | 15.3 | |
| 6 | 2 | Vic Matthews | Great Britain | 15.7 | |

=== Final ===
| Rank | Lane | Name | Nationality | Time | Notes |
|---|---|---|---|---|---|
| 1st place, gold medalist(s) | 4 | Stanko Lorger | Yugoslavia | 14.5 | |
| 2nd place, silver medalist(s) | 2 | Georgi Kaburov | Bulgaria | 14.9 | |
| 3rd place, bronze medalist(s) | 1 | Milad Petrušić | Yugoslavia | 14.9 | |
| 4 | 3 | Imre Retezár | Hungary | 15.1 | |
| 5 | 6 | Ivan Veselský | Czechoslovakia | 15.2 | |
| 6 | 5 | Jean-Claude Reynaud | France | 15.3 | |
