= Heriberto Cruz =

Puerto Rican hurdler

Heriberto Cruz (born 22 March 1939 in Guanica, Puerto Rico) is a Puerto Rican former hurdler who competed in the 1964 Summer Olympics.

== International competitions ==
Year	Competition	Venue	Position	Event	Notes
Representing Puerto Rico
1959	Pan American Games	Chicago, United States	12th	High jump	1.75 m
1962	Central American and Caribbean Games	Kingston, Jamaica	2nd	110 m hurdles	14.5
1962	Ibero-American Games	Madrid, Spain	7th (h)	110 m hurdles	15.3
1963	Pan American Games	São Paulo, Brazil	4th	110 m hurdles	14.7
1963	Pan American Games	São Paulo, Brazil	5th	4 × 100 m relay	42.02
1964	Olympic Games	Tokyo, Japan	28th (h)	110 m hurdles	14.93
1966	Central American and Caribbean Games	San Juan, Puerto Rico	4th (h)	110 m hurdles	14.7^{1}
1966	Central American and Caribbean Games	San Juan, Puerto Rico	1st	400 m hurdles	52.4

^{1}Did not finish in the final
