= Virgil Okiring =

Ugandan hurdler

Personal information
- Nationality: Ugandan
- Born: 25 September 1942 (age 83)

Sport
- Sport: Track and field
- Event: 110 metres hurdles

Virgil Okiring (born 25 September 1942) is a Ugandan hurdler. He competed in the men's 110 metres hurdles at the 1964 Summer Olympics.
