= Wiesław Król =

Polish hurdler (born 1938)

Personal information
- Full name: Wiesław Stanisław Król
- Nationality: Polish
- Born: 3 June 1938 (age 88) Drohobycz, Poland (present-day Ukraine)
- Education: WSWF Kraków
- Height: 1.81 m (5 ft 11 in)
- Weight: 80 kg (176 lb)

Sport
- Sport: Track and field
- Event: 400 metres hurdles
- Club: AZS Gliwice (1957-1961); AZS Kraków (1962-1967)
Medal record
Representing Poland
Summer Universiade
Bronze medal – third place	1959 Turin	400m hurdles
Bronze medal – third place	1961 Sofia	110m hurdles

Wiesław Stanisław Król (born 3 June 1938) is a Polish hurdler. He competed in the men's 400 metres hurdles at the 1960 Summer Olympics.

== International competitions ==
Year	Competition	Venue	Position	Event	Notes
Representing Poland
1957	World University Games	Paris, France	7th (sf)	110 m hurdles	15.3
1959	Universiade	Turin, Italy	9th (sf)	110 m hurdles	14.7
1959	Universiade	Turin, Italy	3rd	400 m hurdles	53.2
1960	Olympic Games	Rome, Italy	18th (h)	400 m hurdles	52.52
1961	Universiade	Sofia, Bulgaria	3rd	110 m hurdles	14.81
1961	Universiade	Sofia, Bulgaria	4th	400 m hurdles	52.76
1961	Universiade	Sofia, Bulgaria	4th	4 × 400 m relay	3:16.76

== Personal bests ==
- 400 metres – 49.1h (Warsaw 1957)
- 110 metres hurdles – 14.5h (Wrocław 1960)
- 400 metres hurdles – 51.5h (Warsaw 1960)
