= Helmut Janz =

West German hurdler (1934–2000)

Medal record

Men's athletics

Representing West Germany

European Championships
Bronze medal – third place	1962 Belgrade	400 m hurdles

Helmut Janz (April 11, 1934 Gladbeck, Germany – November 19, 2000 Neu-Ulm, Germany) was a German track and field athlete.

He finished fourth behind an American sweep in the 400 metres hurdles at the 1960 Olympics. Later in the season he achieved a European record at 49.9. He was the West German champion at 400 hurdles seven times in a row (1957–1963). In 1963 he was awarded the Rudolf Harbig Memorial Prize. He ranked fourth at the Roma Olympics in 1960, but set a European record with 49.9. He was in the lead as he came down the stretch, but then Glenn Davis, Cliff Cushman, and Dick Howard, three Americans, passed him at the last hurdle, later calling it the most disappointing moment of his life. At the 1962 European Championships, he won a bronze after being disqualified in the second round.
