= Zdzisław Kumiszcze =

Polish hurdler

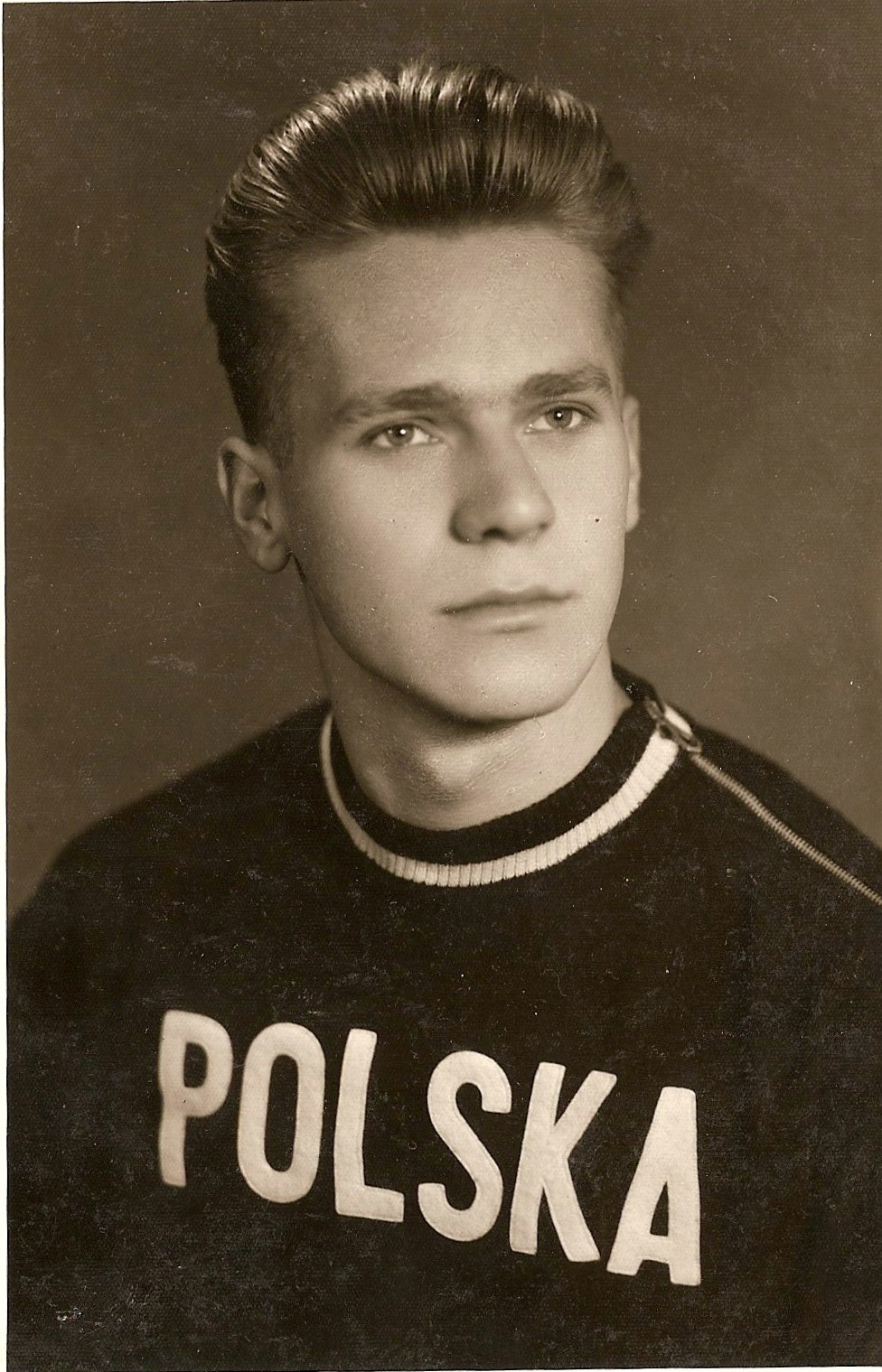

Personal information
- Full name: Zdzisław Adam Kumiszcze
- Nationality: Polish
- Born: 31 March 1937 Toruń, Poland
- Died: 5 October 1986 (aged 49)
- Height: 1.80 m (5 ft 11 in)
- Weight: 74 kg (163 lb)

Sport
- Sport: Track and field
- Event: 400 metres hurdles
- Club: Pomorzanin Toruń (1956); AZS Toruń (1957); Start Katowice (1958–1959); Zawisza Bydgoszcz (1960–1965); Pogoń Szczecin (1966)

Zdzisław Adam Kumiszcze (31 March 1937 – 5 October 1986) was a Polish hurdler. He competed in the men's 400 metres hurdles at the 1960 Summer Olympics.

== International competitions ==
Year	Competition	Venue	Position	Event	Notes
Representing Poland
1960	Olympic Games	Rome, Italy	27th (h)	400 m hurdles	53.47
1962	European Championships	Belgrade, Yugoslavia	12th (h)	400 m hurdles	52.6

== Personal bests ==
- 400 metres – 48.4h (Bydgoszcz 1964)
- 110 metres hurdles – 15.1h (Katowice 1958)
- 400 metres hurdles – 51.5h (Warsaw 1964)
