= Nazzar Al-Jamali =

Iraqi hurdler

Personal information
- Nationality: Iraqi
- Born: 1939 (age 86–87)

Sport
- Sport: Track and field
- Event: 110 metres hurdles

Nazzar Al-Jamali (born 1939) is an Iraqi hurdler. He competed in the men's 110 metres hurdles and Men's 400 metres hurdles at the 1960 Summer Olympics.
