= Anubes da Silva =

Brazilian sprinter (1935–2014)

Personal information
- Full name: Anubes Ferraz da Silva
- Born: 26 September 1935 São Paulo, Brazil
- Died: 10 December 2014 (aged 79) São José do Rio Preto, Brazil

Sport
- Sport: Sprinting
- Event: 400 metres
Medal record
Men's Athletics
Representing Brazil
Ibero-American Games
Silver medal – second place	1960 Santiago	400 m hurdles
Silver medal – second place	1960 Santiago	4x400 m relay
Bronze medal – third place	1960 Santiago	400 m

Anubes Ferraz da Silva (26 September 1935 – 10 December 2014) was a Brazilian sprinter. He competed in the men's 400 metres at the 1960 Summer Olympics. He competed at the 1959 and 1963 Pan American Games in the 400 metres hurdles, placing fourth in 1959 and fifth in 1963.

== International competitions ==
Year	Competition	Venue	Position	Event	Notes
Representing Brazil
1956	South American Championships	Santiago, Chile	3rd	400 m hurdles	54.2
1956	South American Championships	Santiago, Chile	1st	4 × 100 m relay	41.4
1956	South American Championships	Santiago, Chile	2nd	4 × 400 m relay	3:16.1
1957	South American Championships (unofficial)	Santiago, Chile	2nd	400 m	48.2
1957	South American Championships (unofficial)	Santiago, Chile	2nd	400 m hurdles	54.0
1957	South American Championships (unofficial)	Santiago, Chile	1st	4 × 400 m relay	3:15.0
1957	World University Games	Paris, France	7th (sf)	400 m	49.5
1957	World University Games	Paris, France	2nd	400 m hurdles	53.6
1959	South American Championships (unofficial)	São Paulo, Brazil	1st	400 m	49.0
1959	South American Championships (unofficial)	São Paulo, Brazil	4th	800 m	1:55.9
1959	South American Championships (unofficial)	São Paulo, Brazil	1st	400 m hurdles	54.4
1959	South American Championships (unofficial)	São Paulo, Brazil	1st	4 × 400 m relay	3:16.5
1959	Pan American Games	Chicago, United States	8th (sf)	400 m	48.4
1959	Pan American Games	Chicago, United States	4th	400 m hurdles	53.1
1959	Pan American Games	Chicago, United States	4th	4 × 400 m relay	3:16.1
1960	Olympic Games	Rome, Italy	25th (h)	400 m	48.0
1960	Olympic Games	Rome, Italy	12th (h)	400 m hurdles	52.25
1960	Ibero-American Games	Santiago, Chile	3rd	400 m	48.5
1960	Ibero-American Games	Santiago, Chile	2nd	400 m hurdles	53.0
1960	Ibero-American Games	Santiago, Chile	2nd	4 × 400 m relay	3:15.2
1961	South American Championships	Lima, Peru	1st	400 m	48.8
1961	South American Championships	Lima, Peru	2nd	400 m hurdles	52.8
1961	South American Championships	Lima, Peru	2nd	4 × 100 m relay	41.5
1961	South American Championships	Lima, Peru	3rd	4 × 400 m relay	3:18.1
1962	Ibero-American Games	Madrid, Spain	7th (sf)	400 m	49.2
1962	Ibero-American Games	Madrid, Spain	3rd	400 m hurdles	53.0
1962	Ibero-American Games	Madrid, Spain	3rd	4 × 400 m relay	3:16.5
1963	Pan American Games	São Paulo, Brazil	5th	400 m hurdles	52.13
1963	Pan American Games	São Paulo, Brazil	4th	4 × 400 m relay	3:17.1
1963	South American Championships	Cali, Colombia	5th	400 m	48.7
1963	South American Championships	Cali, Colombia	3rd	400 m hurdles	51.8
1963	South American Championships	Cali, Colombia	2nd	4 × 400 m relay	3:14.7
1963	Universiade	Porto Alegre, Brazil	4th (h)	800 m	1:57.0
1963	Universiade	Porto Alegre, Brazil	7th (h)	400 m hurdles	54.0
1963	Universiade	Porto Alegre, Brazil	5th	4 × 400 m relay	3:30.2
