= Athletics at the 1959 Pan American Games – Men's high jump =

Men's high jump at the Pan American Games

The men's high jump event at the 1959 Pan American Games was held at the Soldier Field in Chicago on 28 August.

== Results ==
Rank	Name	Nationality	Result	Notes
1st place, gold medalist(s)	Charles Dumas	United States	2.10	
2nd place, silver medalist(s)	Bob Gardner	United States	2.04	
3rd place, bronze medalist(s)	Ernle Haisley	British West Indies	2.01	
4	Teodoro Flores	Guatemala	1.98	
5	Errol Williams	United States	1.95	
6	Gerald Brisson	Haiti	1.90	
6	Paulo da Silva	Brazil	1.90	
8	Wilf Foss	Canada	1.85	
9	Roberto López	Cuba	1.85	
10	Juan Ruiz	Chile	1.80	
11	Roberto Procel	Mexico	1.80	
12	Julio Llera	Puerto Rico	1.75	
12	Heriberto Cruz	Puerto Rico	1.75	
14	Leopoldo Vásquez	Mexico	1.75	
15	Hans Ackermann	Brazil	1.75	
	Emir Martínez	Argentina	DNS	
	José da Conceição	Brazil	DNS	
	Felix Antonetti	Puerto Rico	DNS	
