= Wolfgang Fischer (athlete) =

German hurdler

Personal information
- Nationality: German
- Born: 27 February 1928 Grüna, Saxony, Germany
- Died: 25 November 1987 (aged 59) Marbach am Neckar, Baden-Württemberg
- Height: 1.75 m (5 ft 9 in)

Sport
- Sport: Track and field
- Event: 400 metres hurdles

Wolfgang Fischer (27 February 1928 – 25 November 1987) was a German hurdler. He competed in the men's 400 metres hurdles at the 1960 Summer Olympics.

Born in what became East Germany, he repatriated to West Germany in 1953. He already represented his new country at the 1954 European Athletics Championships.

Fischer won his first national championship medal at the West German championships in 1954, a silver medal in the 400 metres hurdles. He won the 1955 edition, followed by a silver medals in 1956 and 1957, then bronze in 1958 and 1960. In West Germany he represented the clubs Stuttgarter Kickers, SpVgg Feuerbach and MTV Ludwigsburg.
