= Li Po-ting =

Taiwanese sprinter

Personal information
- Nationality: Taiwanese
- Born: 30 August 1936 (age 89)

Sport
- Sport: Sprinting
- Event: 400 metres

Li Po-ting (born 30 August 1936) is a Taiwanese sprinter. He competed in the men's 400 metres at the 1960 Summer Olympics.
