= Moreno Martini =

Italian hurdler (1935–2009)

Personal information
- Nationality: Italian
- Born: 10 May 1935 Lucca
- Died: 29 January 2009 (aged 73) Lucca
- Height: 1.83 m (6 ft 0 in)
- Weight: 72 kg (159 lb)

Sport
- Country: Italy
- Sport: Athletics
- Event: 400 metres hurdles

Moreno Martini (10 May 1935 – 29 January 2009) was an Italian hurdler who competed at the 1960 Summer Olympics,
