= Mike Fleet =

British athlete

Personal information
- Nationality: British (English)
- Born: 14 February 1938 (age 88) Wandsworth, London, England

Sport
- Sport: Athletics
- Event: Middle distance
- Club: Croydon Harriers
Medal record
Representing Great Britain
Summer Universiade
Bronze medal – third place	1961 Sofia	4x400m relay

Michael Anthony Fleet (born 14 February 1938), is an athletics coach and former athlete who competed for England.

== Biography ==
Fleet represented the England team at the 1962 British Empire and Commonwealth Games in Perth, Australia. He competed in the 880 yards event.

He was a member of the Croydon Harriers Athletics Club and remains there as a coach.
