= Arnold Matsulevych =

Soviet sprinter

Personal information
- Nationality: Soviet
- Born: 14 February 1932 (age 94)

Sport
- Sport: Sprinting
- Event: 4 × 400 metres relay

Arnold Matsulevych (born 14 February 1932) is a Soviet sprinter. He competed in the men's 4 × 400 metres relay at the 1960 Summer Olympics.
