= Boris Kriunov =

Soviet sprinter

Personal information
- Nationality: Soviet
- Born: 20 January 1935 (age 91)

Sport
- Sport: Sprinting
- Event: 4 × 400 metres relay

Boris Kriunov (born 20 January 1935) is a Soviet sprinter. He competed in the men's 4 × 400 metres relay at the 1960 Summer Olympics.
