= Akira Tanaka =

Japanese hurdler (born 1942)

Personal information
- Nationality: Japanese
- Born: 10 March 1942 (age 84)

Sport
- Sport: Track and field
- Event: 110 metres hurdles

Akira Tanaka (田中 章, Tanaka Akira; born 10 March 1942) is a Japanese hurdler. He competed in the men's 110 metres hurdles at the 1964 Summer Olympics.
