= Blaine Lindgren =

American athlete (1939–2019)

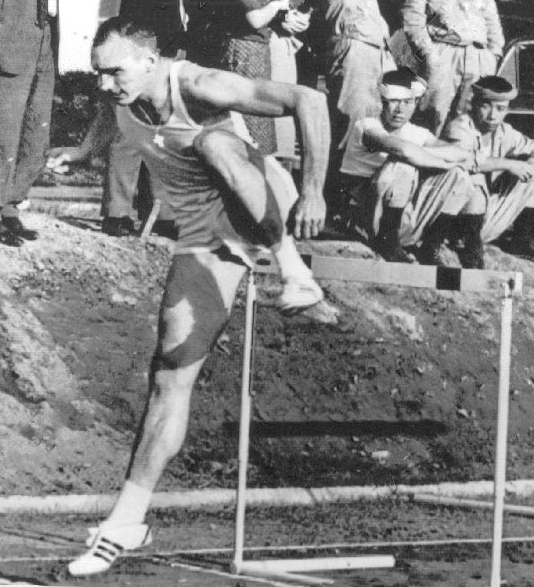
- Lindgren at the 1964 Olympics

Personal information
- Full name: Harold Blaine Lindgren
- Born: June 26, 1939 Salt Lake City, Utah, U.S.
- Died: October 5, 2019 (aged 80) Salt Lake City, Utah, U.S.

Sport
- Sport: Athletics
- Event: 110 m hurdles
- Club: Salt Lake City Recreation Department

Achievements and titles
- Personal best: 13.5 (1963)
Medal record
Men's athletics
Representing the United States
Olympic Games
Silver medal – second place	1964 Tokyo	110 m hurdles
Pan American Games
Gold medal – first place	1963 Sao Paulo	110 m hurdles

Harold Blaine Lindgren (June 26, 1939 – October 5, 2019) was an American athlete who competed mainly in the 110 m hurdles and participated in the 1964 Summer Olympics.

== Biography ==
Lindgren was an All-American hurdler for the Utah Utes track and field team, placing 3rd in the 120 yards hurdles at the 1961 NCAA track and field championships.

He won the 110 metres hurdles event at the 1963 Pan American Games, but then was beaten by Hayes Jones by a small margin in several competitions, including the 1964 national championships and 1964 Olympics, where Lindgren placed second. He graduated from University of Utah and worked for the sheriff's department in Salt Lake City, Utah.

Lindgren won the British AAA Championships titles in the 120 yards and 220 yards hurdles events at the 1962 AAA Championships.

Blaine Lindgren died on October 5, 2019, at the age of 80.
