= Miloje Grujić =

Yugoslav sprinter (1933–2023)

Personal information
- Nationality: Yugoslav
- Born: 7 December 1933 Novi Sad, Serbia
- Died: 8 March 2023 (aged 89) Johannesburg, South Africa
- Height: 180 cm (5 ft 11 in)
- Weight: 62 kg (137 lb)

Sport
- Sport: Sprinting
- Event: 4 × 400 metres relay

Miloje Grujić (7 December 1933 – 8 March 2023) was a Yugoslav sprinter. He competed in the men's 4 × 400 metres relay at the 1960 Summer Olympics. Grujić died in Johannesburg on 8 March 2023, at the age of 89.
