= Satsuo Iwashita =

Japanese long-distance runner (born 1941)

Personal information
- Nationality: Japanese
- Born: 18 August 1941 (age 85)

Sport
- Sport: Long-distance running
- Event: 5000 metres
Medal record
Representing Japan
Asian Games
Bronze medal – third place	1962 Jakarta	1500m
Bronze medal – third place	1966 Bangkok	1500m

Satsuo Iwashita (岩下 察男, Iwashita Satsuo; born 18 August 1941) is a retired Japanese long-distance runner who competed in the men's 5000 metres at the 1964 Summer Olympics.
