= Clifton Cushman =

American hurdler

Medal record

Men's athletics

Representing the United States

Olympic Games
Silver medal – second place	1960 Rome	400 metre hurdles

Clifton Emmett Cushman (June 2, 1938 – September 25, 1966) was an American athlete who competed mainly in the 400 metre hurdles.

He competed for the United States in the 1960 Summer Olympics held in Rome, Italy in the 400 metre hurdles where he won the silver medal.

== High school ==
Cushman was a graduate of Grand Forks Central High School in Grand Forks, North Dakota in 1956. Cushman was an outstanding athlete while running track for the Redskins, breaking and setting many records. In 1990 Cushman was inducted into the Grand Forks Central Athletic Hall of Fame. Randy Heuther of Lisbon High School, ND broke Cushman's record in the hurdles, but then was stripped of the title after a wind-aided controversy.

== College ==
After high school, Cushman attended the University of Kansas where he again broke and set many track records. In 1959, he took second place in the 400-meter hurdles providing Kansas with its backbone to reach its first NCAA Championship. In the next year he was named captain of the Jayhawks. In the same season he also earned most outstanding performer honors at the Kansas Relays, as well as winning the national title in the 400-meter hurdles. Again helping to provide the Jayhawks with that backbone needed to defend the NCAA Championship.

His biggest achievement during his college career was during the 1960 season when Cliff Cushman became an Olympian, competing in the 1960 games in Rome. Cushman finished second overall with a time of 49.6 seconds in the 400-meter hurdles.

== Race to the gold medal ==
In 1964 Cliff Cushman hoped to compete again in the Olympics. However, his hopes of winning a medal were lost when he stumbled over a hurdle at the final U.S. Olympic trial meet in Los Angeles.

Just hours after the meet, Cushman wrote a letter to the youth of his hometown of Grand Forks asking them to not feel sorry for him but instead to set goals for themselves.

== U.S. Air Force ==
After Cushman's successful career at the University of Kansas, he joined the United States Air Force. His last posting before being sent to Vietnam was at Payne Field just south of Everett, Washington.

== Death ==
On September 25, 1966, Cushman was the pilot of the #2 F-105D in a flight of three that was conducting an afternoon combat mission to bomb a railroad bridge located on the northeast railroad line approximately 1 mile (1.6 km) north-northeast of Kép Air Base and 29 miles (47 km) northeast of Bac Giang, Lang Son Province, North Vietnam. Cushman's call sign was "Devil 2." The flight arrived in the target area on schedule and immediately checked in with the airborne battlefield command and control center (ABCCC). Devil Flight was directed to begin their bomb runs on the bridge.

At 1530 hours, Devil Lead made his pass on the target followed in order by the rest of his flight. After pulling off the target, Cushman radioed that he had been hit by anti-aircraft artillery (AAA) fire and he had a fire warning light. Devil 3 asked if he could steer, Cushman replied he had "lost his stability, augmentation and aircraft power."

Devil Lead observed 37 mm AAA fire bursting to the left and rear of Devil 2 (Cushman), and told Cushman to break right. Lead then saw his afterburner light and a simultaneous torch of flames coming from the right aft section of Devil 2 (Cushman)'s aircraft. Devil Lead then observed Cushman's aircraft break into several burning parts. He also saw Cushman's ejection seat arcing up and to the front of the falling wreckage. They could not find his body anywhere. Because of the rough landscape it was nearly impossible for anyone to gain radio control. Cushman was immediately listed Missing in Action, and this was later changed to the presumptive finding of death.

On November 6, 1975, Cushman was officially declared dead.

Surviving family members were spouse Carolyn Cushman and son Colin Cushman.

== Memorials ==
Grand Forks Central High School and Red River High School named the football stadium they share after him, Cushman Field. Every fall, the football game between the two schools is called the Cushman Classic. His picture is displayed in GFC's gymnasium, and his name is mentioned in almost every Hall of Fame cabinet.

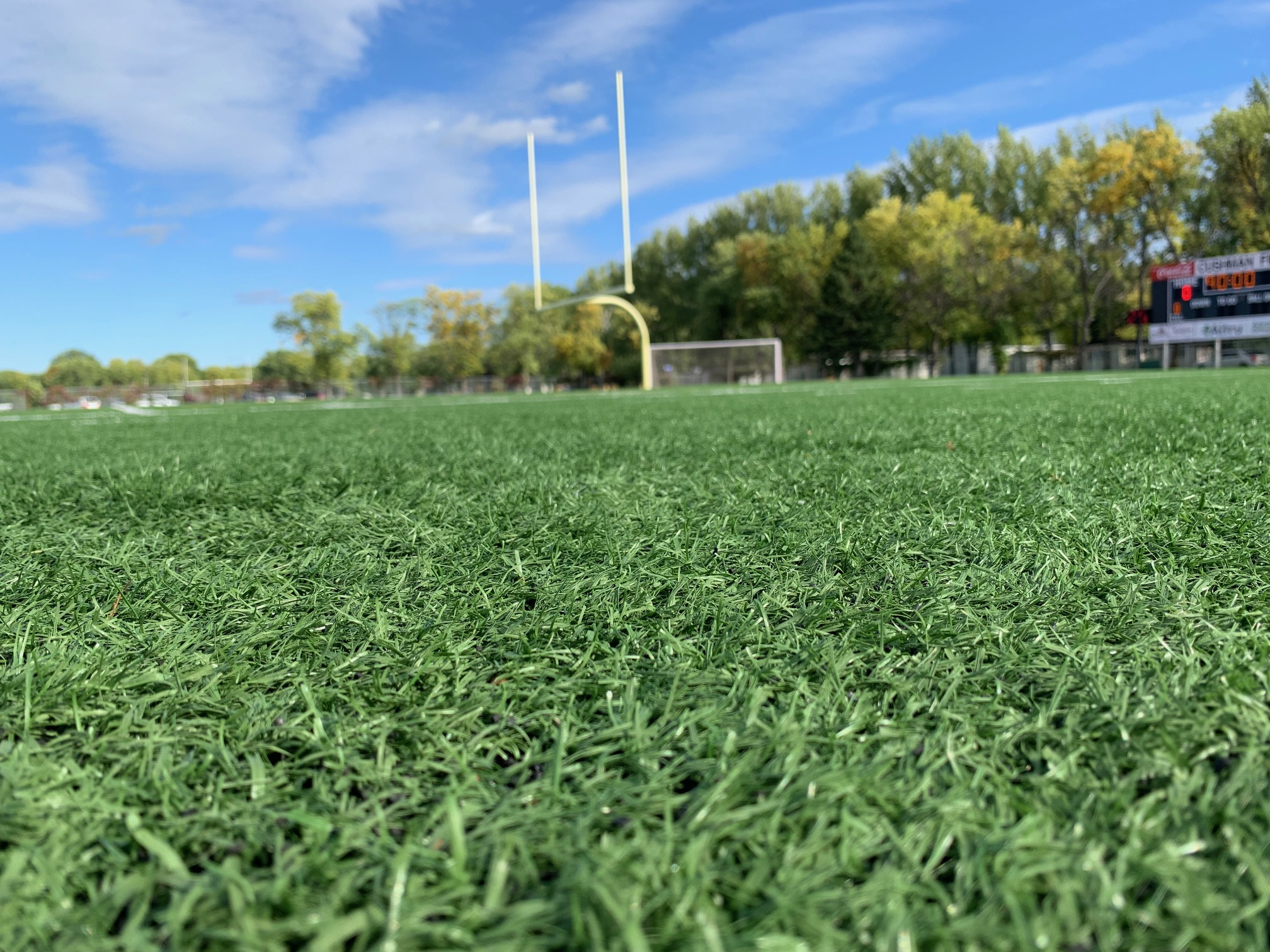

His wife said after being informed of her husband's status: "Somewhere in Vietnam he's running the biggest race of his life. It's like watching a race in which Cliff is running - only you can't see the finish tape. He's in excellent physical condition. Cliff also has a very deep faith in God. What better combination could there be?"

== Links ==
- Mayer, Bill (September 21, 2006). "Game-day flyover would be fitting tribute to Cushman". Lawrence Journal-World. Lawrence Journal-World.
- Defense Prisoner of War/Missing Personnel Office -- Additional case details on CUSHMAN, CLIFTON EMMET from the US Government database on Personnel Missing in Southeast Asia -- Vietnam War
