= Gustav Ntiforo =

Ghanaian sprinter (1933–2021)

Personal information
- Born: 26 March 1933 Awisa, Ghana
- Died: 11 October 2021 (aged 88) Albuquerque, New Mexico, United States

Sport
- Sport: Track and field

Gustav Ntiforo Kwasi (26 March 1933 – 11 October 2021) was a Ghanaian sprinter who competed in the 1960 Summer Olympics. Ntiforo was born in Awisa, Ghana on 26 March 1933. He died in Albuquerque, New Mexico on 11 October 2021, at the age of 88.
