= Kiyoshi Asai =

Japanese sprinter (born 1940)

Personal information
- Nationality: Japanese
- Born: 6 February 1940 (age 86)

Sport
- Sport: Sprinting
- Event: 4 × 100 metres relay
Medal record
Representing Japan
Asian Games
Silver medal – second place	1962 Jakarta	4x100m relay
Summer Universiade
Silver medal – second place	1961 Sofia	4x100m relay

Kiyoshi Asai (浅井 浄, Asai Kiyoshi; born 6 February 1940) is a Japanese sprinter. He competed in the men's 4 × 100 metres relay at the 1964 Summer Olympics.
