= Dick Howard (hurdler) =

American hurdler

Medal record

Men's athletics

Representing the United States

Olympic Games
Bronze medal – third place	1960 Rome	400 m hurdles

Richard "Dick" Wayne Howard (August 22, 1935 – November 9, 1967) was an American athlete who competed mainly in the 400 metre hurdles.

He competed for the United States in the 1960 Summer Olympics held in Rome, Italy, where he won the bronze medal in the 400 metre hurdles. Running for the University of New Mexico, he was the 1959 NCAA Champion at 440 yard hurdles, the first time the event was held.

Howard died of a heroin overdose in 1967.
