= Georgy Chevychalov =

Soviet hurdler

Personal information
- Full name: Georgy Ivanovich Chevychalov
- Nationality: Soviet
- Born: 17 December 1935 Magnitogorsk, Soviet Union
- Died: November 2000 (aged 64)

Sport
- Sport: Track and field
- Event: 400 metres hurdles
Medal record
Representing Soviet Union
Summer Universiade
Silver medal – second place	1961 Sofia	400m hurdles

Georgy Ivanovich Chevychalov (Russian: Гео́ргий Ива́нович Чевыча́лов; 17 December 1935 – November 2000) was a Soviet hurdler. He competed in the men's 400 metres hurdles at the 1960 Summer Olympics.
