= Yojiro Muro =

Japanese sprinter

Personal information
- Nationality: Japanese
- Born: 5 July 1933 (age 92)

Sport
- Sport: Sprinting
- Event: 4 × 100 metres relay
Medal record
Representing Japan
Summer Universiade
Silver medal – second place	1961 Sofia	4x100m relay

Yojiro Muro (室 洋二郎, Muro Yōjirō; born 5 July 1933) is a Japanese sprinter. He competed in the men's 4 × 100 metres relay at the 1964 Summer Olympics.
