= Kimitada Hayase =

Japanese sprinter (1940–2012)

Personal information
- Nationality: Japanese
- Born: 5 September 1940 Aichi Prefecture, Japan
- Died: 7 May 2012 (aged 71)

Sport
- Sport: Track and field
- Event(s): 200m, 400m, 4×100m, 4×400m
Medal record
Representing Japan
Asian Games
Bronze medal – third place	1962 Jakarta	400m
Bronze medal – third place	1962 Jakarta	4x400m relay
Summer Universiade
Silver medal – second place	1961 Sofia	4x100m relay

Kimitada Hayase (早瀬 公忠, Hayase Kimitada; 5 September 1940 – 7 May 2012) was a Japanese sprinter. He competed at the 1960 and 1964 Summer Olympics.
