= László Mihályfi =

Hungarian sprinter

Personal information
- Nationality: Hungarian
- Born: 21 September 1939 (age 86) Mezőkeresztes, Hungary
- Height: 182 cm (6 ft 0 in)
- Weight: 78 kg (172 lb)

Sport
- Sport: Athletics
- Event: Sprints
- Club: BEAC, Budapest
Medal record
Representing Hungary
Summer Universiade
Gold medal – first place	1961 Sofia	200m
Gold medal – first place	1963 Porto Alegre	4x100m relay
Silver medal – second place	1963 Porto Alegre	4x400m relay
Bronze medal – third place	1961 Sofia	100m

László Mihályfi (born 21 September 1939) is a Hungarian former sprinter who competed in the 1964 Summer Olympics.

== Biography ==
Mihályfi competed in the men's 100 metres and men's 4 x100 metres relay at the 1964 Olympic Games in Tokyo.

He finished third behind Pat Morrison in the 220 yards event at the 1965 AAA Championships.

Mihályfi also medalled at the Summer Universiade.
