= Mikhail Bachvarov =

Bulgarian sprinter

Personal information
- Nationality: Bulgarian
- Born: 29 December 1935 Yambol, Kingdom of Bulgaria
- Died: 7 July 2009 (aged 73) Sofia, Bulgaria
- Height: 174 cm (5 ft 9 in)

Sport
- Sport: Sprinting
- Events: 100 metres, 200 metres

Mikhail Yordanov Bachvarov (Bulgarian: Михаил Йорданов Бъчваров; 29 December 1935 – 7 July 2009) was a Bulgarian sprinter. He competed in the men's 100 metres at the 1960 Summer Olympics. He participated twice in the European Championships – in 1958 and 1962.

He died on 7 July 2009 in Sofia.
