= John Cooper (hurdler) =

British athlete (1940–1974)

Personal information
- Nationality: British (English)
- Born: 18 December 1940 Bromyard, Herefordshire, England
- Died: 3 March 1974 (aged 33) Fontaine-Chaalis, Oise, France
- Height: 188 cm (6 ft 2 in)
- Weight: 85 kg (187 lb)

Sport
- Sport: Athletics
- Event: hurdles
- Club: Birchfield Harriers
Medal record
Representing Great Britain
Men's athletics
Summer Olympics
Silver medal – second place	1964 Tokyo	400 metre hurdles
Silver medal – second place	1964 Tokyo	4 x 400 metre relay
Summer Universiade
Bronze medal – third place	1961 Sofia	4 x 400 m

John Hugh Cooper (18 December 1940 – 3 March 1974) was a British athlete who competed mainly in the 400 metre hurdles and competed at two Olympic Games.

== Biography ==
Cooper was born in Bromyard, Herefordshire, England and was educated at Lutterworth Grammar School.

Cooper finished third behind Jussi Rintamäki in the 440 yards hurdles event at the 1961 AAA Championships. He then finished runner-up to Willie Atterberry at the 1963 AAA Championships but because he was the highest placed British athlete he was considered the British 440 yards hurdles champion and he subsequently won the title outright at the 1964 AAA Championships.

He competed for Great Britain in the 1964 Summer Olympics held in Tokyo, Japan, in the 400 metre hurdles, where he won the silver medal. He then joined with teammates Tim Graham, Adrian Metcalfe, and Robbie Brightwell in the 4 x 400 metres relay, where they won the silver medal. Cooper also competed in the 400 metre hurdles at the 1968 Summer Olympics in Mexico, serving as Great Britain's third-string athlete in this event, behind gold medallist David Hemery and bronze medallist John Sherwood.

He was killed in the Turkish Airlines Flight 981 crash in the Ermenonville Forest near, Paris (France), on 3 March 1974.

== Notes ==
- Wallechinsky, David. (1984). The Complete Book of the Olympics. New York: Penguin Books. pp. 57, 67.
