= Valentin Chistyakov =

Russian hurdler

Personal information
- Born: 1 November 1939 Rostov-on-Don, Soviet Union
- Died: 28 July 1982 (aged 42)

Sport
- Sport: Track and field
Medal record
Representing Soviet Union
Summer Universiade
Gold medal – first place	1961 Sofia	110m hurdles
Gold medal – first place	1961 Sofia	4x100m relay
European Indoor Championships
Silver medal – second place	1967 Prague	50m hurdles

Valentin Viktorovich Chistyakov (1 November 1939 – 28 July 1982) was a Soviet hurdler who competed in the 1960 Summer Olympics and in the 1964 Summer Olympics for the Soviet Union.
