= Keiji Ogushi =

Japanese hurdler (1934–2020)

Keiji Ogushi (大串 啓二, Ōgushi Keiji; 3 April 1934 – 17 March 2020) was a Japanese hurdler who competed in the 1956 Summer Olympics, in the 1960 Summer Olympics, and in the 1964 Summer Olympics.

He died on 17 March 2020 from pneumonia.
