= Chris Goudge =

British hurdler (1935–2010)

Personal information
- Nationality: British (English)
- Born: 4 March 1935 Prestwich, England
- Died: 7 November 2010 (aged 75) Devon, England
- Height: 183 cm (6 ft 0 in)
- Weight: 71 kg (157 lb)

Sport
- Sport: Athletics
- Event: 400m Hurdles
- Club: Bolton United Harriers

Christopher Edward Goudge (4 March 1935 Prestwich, Greater Manchester, England– 7 November 2010 Devon, United Kingdom) was a British athlete who competed in the 400m hurdles at the 1960 Summer Olympic Games in Rome.

== Early life ==
Goudge was born in Prestwich, Greater Manchester, England where his father was an inspector for Lloyds Bank. The family settled in Bolton where he attended Bolton School. While doing national service with the Royal Tank Regiment he also represented them as a runner. He studied physics at UMIST, also playing clarinet and representing the University in athletics.

== Sporting career ==
He joined Bolton Harriers running club and achieved early success in the high jump, winning the senior Lancashire event while still a junior. He also became successful as a runner and hurdler; in 1957 he was a member of the silver medal-winning British team in the 4x400m relay at the World Student Games and the following year he represented the England athletics team at the Cardiff Commonwealth Games in the 440m hurdles.

Goudge became the British 440 yards hurdles champion after winning the British AAA Championships title at the 1959 AAA Championships.

He held the English record for this title between 1958 and 1964, also being selected to compete in the 400m hurdles at the 1960 Rome Olympics. He ran 52.6 in the third heat, finishing fourth, which turned out to be insufficient to qualify him for the semi-finals. He was unfortunate in that it was the first three to qualify in the heat and he had the two USA athletes Glenn Davis who went on to win the gold medal and Clifton Cushman who went on to win the silver in his heat. Glenn Davis is believed to be the greatest 400m runner of all time winning the 400m hurdles gold in 1956 and 1960 and was a member of the gold medal winning 4x400m relay team also in 1960. For good measure he was at one time world record holder in the 400m flat event.

== Post-Olympics and legacy ==
Goudge and his wife Elizabeth had two children, Caroline and Jonathan. The rest of his life was spent teaching physics until his retirement in 1995, when he moved to Devon. He is commemorated in Bolton as part of the "Spirit of Sport" statue on De Havilland Way.
