= Salvatore Morale =

Italian hurdler (born 1938)

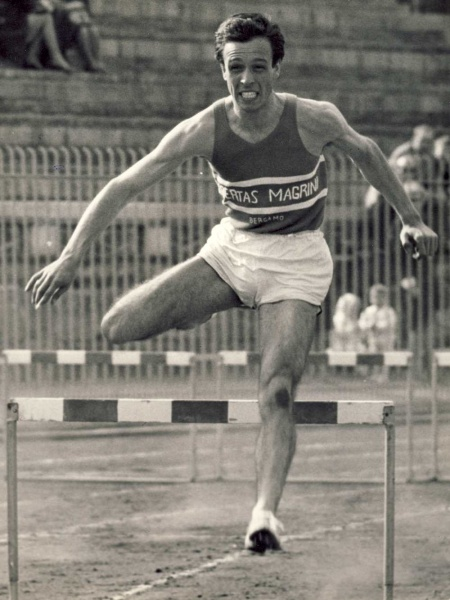
- Tito Morale with the jersey of his club (Libertas Magrini) in a race in Italy in the 1960s

Personal information
- Nickname: Tito
- Nationality: Italian
- Born: 4 November 1938 (age 87) Teolo, Italy
- Height: 1.83 m (6 ft 0 in)
- Weight: 75 kg (165 lb)

Sport
- Sport: Athletics
- Event: 400 metres hurdles
- Club: Libertas Magrini Bergamo

Achievements and titles
- Personal bests: 400 m: 47.6 (1962); 400 m hs: 49.2 (1962)
Medal record
Men's athletics
Representing Italy
Olympic Games
Bronze medal – third place	1964 Tokyo	400 m hurdles
European Championships
Gold medal – first place	1962 Belgrade	400 m hurdles
Universiade
Gold medal – first place	1959 Turin	400 m hurdles
Gold medal – first place	1961 Sofia	400 m hurdles
Bronze medal – third place	1963 Porto Alegre	400 m hurdles

Salvatore "Tito" Morale (born 4 November 1938) is an Italian athlete who mainly competed in the 400-metre hurdles.

He won five medals, at the senior level, and at the International athletics competitions.

== Biography ==
He competed for Italy in the 400-metre hurdles at the 1964 Summer Olympics held in Tokyo, Japan, where he won the bronze medal. In 1962, at the European Championships, Morale won the gold medal in the 400 metres hurdles and equalled the world record of Glenn Davis. He has 22 caps in the national team from 1956 to 1964.

On 14 September 1962, Morale set a European record in Belgrade after recording 49.2 sec over 400 metres hurdles, tis stood until 13 October 1968.

Morale won the British AAA Championships title in the 440 yards hurdles event at the 1961 AAA Championships.

== Olympic results ==
Year	Competition	Venue	Position	Event	Performance	Notes
1960	Olympic Games	(Italy) Rome	SF	400 metres hurdles	51.3	
1964	Olympic Games	(Japan) Tokyo	3rd	400 metres hurdles	50.1	
1964	Olympic Games	(Japan) Tokyo	Heat	4 × 400 metres relay	3:07.6	

== National titles ==
Salvatore Morale has won 4 times consecutively the individual national championship.

- 4 wins in the 400 metres hurdles (1957, 1958, 1960, 1961)

== See also ==
- FIDAL Hall of Fame
