= Walter Oberste =

German sprinter

Personal information
- Nationality: German
- Born: 25 December 1933 (age 92) Westhofen, Alzey-Worms, Germany

Sport
- Sport: Sprinting
- Event: 4 × 400 metres relay
Medal record
Representing West Germany
Summer Universiade
Gold medal – first place	1959 Turin	4x400m relay
Silver medal – second place	1959 Turin	400m

Walter Oberste (born 25 December 1933) is a German sprinter. He competed in the men's 4 × 400 metres relay at the 1956 Summer Olympics.
