= Elio Catola =

Italian hurdler

Personal information
- Nationality: Italian
- Born: 19 November 1935 (age 90) Uliveto Terme, Italy
- Height: 1.77 m (5 ft 9 1/2 in)
- Weight: 73 kg (161 lb)

Sport
- Country: Italy
- Sport: Athletics
- Event: 400 metres hurdles
- Club: CUS Pisa

Achievements and titles
- Personal best: 400 m hs: 51.94 (1960)
Medal record
Summer Universiade
Silver medal – second place	1959 Turin	4x400 metres relay
Bronze medal – third place	1961 Sofia	400 metres hurdles

Elio Catola (born 19 November 1935 in Uliveto Terme, Pisa) was an Italian athlete who mainly competed in the 400 metre hurdles.

== Biography ==
He won two medals, at senior level, at the International athletics competitions. He has 7 caps in national team from 1959 to 1962.

== Olympic results ==
Year	Competition	Venue	Position	Event	Performance	Notes
1960	Olympic Games	(Italy) Rome	SF	400 metres hurdles	52.3	

== See also ==
- Italy national relay team
