= Josef Trousil =

Czech sprinter

Personal information
- Born: 2 February 1935 (age 91) Městečko, Czechoslovakia

Sport
- Sport: Track and field
Medal record
Representing Czechoslovakia
Summer Universiade
Gold medal – first place	1961 Sofia	400m
Silver medal – second place	1961 Sofia	4x400m relay
European Indoor Championships
Silver medal – second place	1966 Dortmund	4x320m relay
Bronze medal – third place	1967 Prague	4x300m relay

Josef Trousil (born 2 February 1935) is a former Czechsoslovak sprinter who competed in the 1956 Summer Olympics, in the 1960 Summer Olympics, and in the 1964 Summer Olympics. Between 1956 and 1967, he became a national champion in 400 metres and 4 × 400 metres relay disciplines multiple times.
