= Athletics at the 1961 Summer Universiade =

Athletics at the II Summer Universiade
- Dates: 31 August – 3 September
- Host city: Sofia, Bulgaria
- Venue: Vasil Levski National Stadium
- Events: 29

Athletics events were contested at the 1961 Summer Universiade in Sofia, Bulgaria.

== Medal summary ==
=== Men ===
Event	Gold		Silver		Bronze	
100 metres	Enrique Figuerola (CUB)	10.38	Berwyn Jones (GBR)	10.59	László Mihályfi (HUN)	10.65
200 metres	László Mihályfi (HUN)	21.27	Brian Smouha (GBR)	21.40	Brian Anson (GBR)	21.51
400 metres	Josef Trousil (TCH)	47.51	Jacques Pennewaert (BEL)	48.06	Otto Grasshoff (FRG)	48.53
800 metres	Ron Delany (IRL)	1:51.1	Rudolf Klaban (AUT)	1:51.4	Wolfgang Schöll (FRG)	1:51.6
1500 metres	Tomáš Salinger (TCH)	3:45.75	Zoltan Vamoș (ROM)	3:45.85	Rudolf Klaban (AUT)	3:46.16
5000 metres	János Pintér (HUN)	14:23.4	Andrei Barabás (ROM)	14:23.8	Peter Kubicki (FRG)	14.23.8
110 metres hurdles	Valentin Chistyakov (URS)	14.33	Klaus Willimczik (FRG)	14.62	Wiesław Król (POL)	14.81
400 metres hurdles	Salvatore Morale (ITA)	50.14	Georgiy Chevychalov (URS)	51.80	Elio Catola (ITA)	52.33
4 × 100 metres relay	Soviet Union (URS); Leonid Bartenyev; Valentin Chistyakov; Anatoly Mikhaylov; Edvin Ozolin	41.22	Japan (JPN); Kiyoshi Asai; Hirotada Hayase; Yojiro Muro; Takayuki Okazaki	41.30	West Germany (FRG); Hans-Jürgen Felsen; Rudolf Sundermann; Hinrick Helmke; Joachim Guter	41.35
4 × 400 metres relay	West Germany (FRG); Peter Hoppe; Wolfgang Schöll; Otto Graßhoff; Albert Grawitz	3:10.56	Czechoslovakia (TCH); Josef Trousil; Josef Odložil; Milan Jílek; Tomáš Salinger	3:12.93	Great Britain (GBR); Menzies Campbell; John Cooper; Mike Fleet; Mike Robinson	3:14.63
High jump	Valeriy Brumel (URS)	2.25	Igor Kashkarov (URS)	2.08	Milan Valenta (TCH)	2.03
Pole vault	Dimitar Khlebarov (BUL)	4.52	Gérard Barras (SUI)	4.52	Ihor Petrenko (URS)	4.52
Long jump	Igor Ter-Ovanesyan (URS)	7.90	Takayuki Okazaki (JPN)	7.67	Ivan Ivanov (BUL)	7.58
Triple jump	Sorin Ioan (ROM)	15.93	Oleg Ryakhovskiy (URS)	15.85	Tomio Ota (JPN)	15.65
Shot put	Viktor Lipsnis (URS)	18.00	Dieter Urbach (FRG)	17.64	Zsigmond Nagy (HUN)	17.57
Discus throw	Edmund Piątkowski (POL)	59.15	Kaupo Metsur (URS)	54.20	Virgil Manolescu (ROM)	52.52
Hammer throw	Gyula Zsivótzky (HUN)	64.62	Gennadiy Kondrashov (URS)	63.38	John Lawlor (IRL)	63.33
Javelin throw	Gergely Kulcsár (HUN)	77.65	Janusz Sidło (POL)	77.48	Rolf Herings (FRG)	75.67
Decathlon	Vasili Kuznetsov (URS)	7918	Milan Kuzmanov (BUL)	6226	Klaus-Dieter Röper (FRG)	6209

=== Women ===
Event	Gold		Silver		Bronze	
100 metres	Tatyana Shchelkanova (URS)	11.78	Galina Popova (URS)	11.90	Joan Atkinson (GBR)	11.93
200 metres	Barbara Janiszewska (POL)	24.44	Joan Atkinson (GBR)	24.49	Vera Kabranyuk (URS)	24.70
800 metres	Antje Gleichfeld (FRG)	2:07.76	Florica Grecescu (ROM)	2:08.67	Tsvetana Isaeva (BUL)	2:12.59
80 metres hurdles	Irina Press (URS)	10.90	Rimma Koshelyova (URS)	11.01	Snezhana Kerkova (BUL)	11.09
4 × 100 metres relay	Soviet Union (URS); Irina Press; Tatyana Shchelkanova; Rimma Koshelyova; Larisa Kuleshova	46.2	Poland (POL); Mirosława Sałacińska; Irena Szczupak; Elżbieta Krzesińska; Barbara Janiszewska	47.6	Bulgaria (BUL); Stefka Ilieva; Diana Yorgova; Svetlana Isaeva; Rossitsa Madzharska	47.9
High jump	Iolanda Balaș (ROM)	1.85	Klara Pushkaryeva (URS)	1.67	Thelma Hopkins (GBR)	1.65
Long jump	Tatyana Shchelkanova (URS)	6.49	Diana Yorgova (BUL)	6.12	Elżbieta Krzesińska (POL)	6.11
Shot put	Tamara Press (URS)	17.12	Irina Press (URS)	15.61	Ana Roth (ROM)	15.59
Discus throw	Tamara Press (URS)	58.06	Antonina Zolotukhina (URS)	53.82	Jolán Kontsek (HUN)	52.51
Javelin throw	Yelena Gorchakova (URS)	51.39	Maria Diaconescu (ROM)	50.64	Almut Brömmel (FRG)	47.65

== Medal table ==
Rank	Nation	Gold	Silver	Bronze	Total
1	Soviet Union (URS)	13	10	2	25
2	Hungary (HUN)	4	0	3	7
3	Romania (ROM)	2	4	2	8
4	West Germany (FRG)	2	2	7	11
5	Poland (POL)	2	2	2	6
6	Czechoslovakia (TCH)	2	1	1	4
7	Bulgaria (BUL)	1	2	4	7
8	Ireland (IRL)	1	0	1	2
8	Italy (ITA)	1	0	1	2
10	Cuba (CUB)	1	0	0	1
11	Great Britain (GBR)	0	3	4	7
12	Japan (JPN)	0	2	1	3
13	Austria (AUT)	0	1	1	2
14	Belgium (BEL)	0	1	0	1
14	Switzerland (SUI)	0	1	0	1
Totals (15 entries)		29	29	29	87

== See also ==
- FISU World University Games
- University and college sport
