= Athletics at the 1959 Mediterranean Games =

1959 Athletics at the Mediterranean Games

- Dates: 19–23 October
- Host city: (Lebanon) Beirut
- Venue: Camille Chamoun Stadium
- Events: 23
- Participation: 131 athletes from 9 nations

Athletics at the 1959 Mediterranean Games were held in Beirut, Lebanon and took place from 19 to 23 October.

== Medal table ==
Rank	Nation	Gold	Silver	Bronze	Total
1	France	11	5	3	19
2	Greece	6	7	6	19
3	Yugoslavia	3	2	1	6
4	Spain	1	5	5	11
5	Morocco	1	1	0	2
5	Turkey	1	1	0	2
7	United Arab Republic	0	1	7	8
8	Tunisia	0	1	0	1
Totals (8 entries)		23	23	22	68

== Medal summary ==
=== Track ===
Event	Gold		Silver		Bronze	
100 metres	Abdoulaye Seye (FRA)	10.3 GR	Paul Genevay (FRA)	10.6	Alain David (FRA)	10.6
200 metres	Paul Genevay (FRA)	20.9 GR	Nikolaos Georgopoulos (GRE)	21.5	Bernard Cahen (FRA)	21.8
400 metres	Viktor Šnajder (YUG)	47.1 GR	(United Arab Republic) Hassan El Din Ahmed Ragab	48.3	Vassilios Sillis (GRE)	48.7
800 metres	Pierre-Yvon Lenoir (FRA)	1:55.4	Tomás Barris (ESP)	1:55.8	Evangelos Depastas (GRE)	1:56.1
1500 metres	Tomás Barris (ESP)	3:50.6	Jean Clausse (FRA)	3:51.8	Evangelos Depastas (GRE)	3:52.6
5000 metres	Robert Bogey (FRA)	14:31.0	Luis García (ESP)	14:32.6	Carlos Perez (ESP)	14:45.0
10,000 metres	Hamoud Ameur (FRA)	30:19.2 GR	Mohamed Saïd (MAR)	30:22.4	Luis García (ESP)	30:24.2
Marathon	Bakir Benaïssa (MAR)	2:24:14.8 GR	Miguel Navarro (ESP)	2:27:27.8	Mahmoud Abdelkrim (UAR)	2:35:03.4
110 metres hurdles	Georgios Marsellos (GRE)	14.5 GR	Marcel Duriez (FRA)	14.5	Emilio Campra (ESP)	15.4
400 metres hurdles	Fahir Özgüden (TUR)	53.4	Mongi Zarrouki (TUN)	54.1	Abdel Mohamed Abdallah (EGY)	54.4
3000 m steeplechase	Georgios Papavasileiou (GRE)	9:04.0 GR	Manuel Alonso (ESP)	9:06.2	Franc Hafner (YUG)	9:09.6
4 x 100 metres relay	France; Bernard Cahen; Alain David; Paul Genevay; Ali Brakchi	41.5	Greece; Ioannis Komitoudis; Constantin Lolos; Leonidas Kormalis; Nikolaos Georgopoulos	41.7	Spain; Emilio Campra; José Luis Martínez; Jesús Rancaño; José Luis Albarran	42.2
4 x 400 metres relay	Greece; Leonidas Kormalis; Konstantinos Moragiemos; Nikolaos Georgopoulos; Vassilios Sillis	3:15.0	France; Paul Genevay; Jean-Pierre Goudeau; Jean Bertozzi; Pierre-Yvon Lenoir	3:15.4	United Arab Republic; Farouk Tadros; Rachoui; Abdel Moneim Abdallah; Hassan Ahmed Ragab	3:17.6
20 km walk	Pierre Attane (FRA)	1:43:16.6	Stavros Hatzilaios (GRE)	1:50:18.6	not assigned	

=== Field ===
Event	Gold		Silver		Bronze	
High jump	Maurice Fournier (FRA)	1.99 m	Çetin Şahiner (TUR)	1.96 m	Michel Hermann (FRA)	1.90 m
Long jump	Ali Brakchi (FRA)	7.59 m GR	Dimos Manglaras (GRE)	7.44 m	Manuel González (ESP)	7.24 m
Pole vault	Rigas Efstathiadis (GRE)	4.10 m	Fernando Adarraga (ESP)	3.80 m	Farid Hanna (UAR)	3.80 m
Triple jump	Éric Battista (FRA)	15.82 m GR	Marc Rabémila (FRA)	15.47 m	Mahmoud Atef Abdel Fattah (UAR)	15.04 m
Shot put	Georgios Tsakanikas (GRE)	16.97 m GR	Antonios Kounadis (GRE)	15.12 m	Chebel Hassan Farag (UAR)	14.95 m
Discus throw	Antonios Kounadis (GRE)	55.02 m GR	Dako Radošević (YUG)	54.01 m	Georgios Tsakanikas (GRE)	47.88 m
Hammer throw	Krešimir Račić (YUG)	62.26 m GR	Frangiskos Politis (GRE)	55.44 m	Andreas Kouvelogiannis (GRE)	53.31 m
Javelin throw	Léon Syrovatski (FRA)	74.10 m GR	Božidar Miletić (YUG)	73.80 m	Myron Anyfantakis (GRE)	68.80 m
Decathlon	Jože Brodnik (YUG)	6581 pts GR	Georgios Marsellos (GRE)	5908 pts	Mohamed Saïd Zaki (UAR)	5816 pts

== Participating nations ==
- France (20)
- Greece (24)
- Lebanon (21)
- Morocco (6)
- Spain (13)
- Tunisia (5)
- Turkey (8)
- United Arab Republic (28)
- Yugoslavia (6)

== Results ==
=== 100 meters ===
Heats – 19 October

Rank	Heat	Name	Nationality	Time	Notes
1	1	Abdoulaye Seye	France	10.9	Q
2	1	Ioannis Komitoudis	Greece	10.9	Q
3	1	José Luis Albarran	Spain	11.2	Q
4	1	Aydin Onur	Turkey	11.5	Q
5	1	Tadros Farouk	United Arab Republic	11.7	
1	2	Paul Genevay	France	10.5	Q
2	2	Nikolaos Georgopoulos	Greece	10.7	Q
3	2	Hassan El Din Ahmed Ragab	United Arab Republic	10.9	Q
4	2	Bougaib M'Rak	Morocco	11.2	Q
5	2	Mounir Maasri	Lebanon	11.8	
1	3	Alain David	France	10.6	Q
2	3	Abdulai Soliman Taisir	United Arab Republic	10.9	Q
3	3	Constantin Lolos	Greece	11.2	Q
4	3	Mounir Zeitoun	Lebanon	11.5	Q

Semifinals – 19 October

Rank	Heat	Name	Nationality	Time	Notes
1	1	Paul Genevay	France	10.5	Q
2	1	Abdulai Soliman Taisir	United Arab Republic	10.8	Q
3	1	Ioannis Komitoudis	Greece	10.9	Q
4	1	José Luis Albarran	Spain	11.0	
5	1	Constantin Lolos	Greece	11.3	
6	1	Mounir Zeitoun	Lebanon	??.?	
1	2	Abdoulaye Seye	France	10.5	Q
2	2	Alain David	France	10.6	Q
3	2	Nikolaos Georgopoulos	Greece	10.6	Q
4	2	Hassan El Din Ahmed Ragab	United Arab Republic	11.2	
5	2	Bougaib M'Rak	Morocco	11.3	
6	2	Aydin Onur	Turkey	??.?	

Final – 20 October

Rank	Name	Nationality	Time	Notes
1st place, gold medalist(s)	Abdoulaye Seye	France	10.3	GR
2nd place, silver medalist(s)	Paul Genevay	France	10.6	
3rd place, bronze medalist(s)	Alain David	France	10.8	
4	Nikolaos Georgopoulos	Greece	11.0	
5	Abdulai Soliman Taisir	United Arab Republic	11.0	
6	Ioannis Komitoudis	Greece	11.0	

=== 200 meters ===
Heats – 21 October

Rank	Heat	Name	Nationality	Time	Notes
1	1	Nikolaos Georgopoulos	Greece	21.6	Q
2	1	Ioannis Komitoudis	Greece	22.2	Q
3	1	José Luis Albarran	Spain	22.4	Q
4	1	Bougaib M'Rak	Morocco	22.6	
5	1	Tadros Farouk	United Arab Republic	23.1	
	1	Abdoulaye Seye	France	DNS	
1	2	Paul Genevay	France	20.8	Q, GR, =NR
2	2	Bernard Cahen	France	21.1	Q
3	2	Leonidas Kormalis	Greece	22.3	Q
4	2	Abdulai Soliman Taisir	United Arab Republic	22.6	
5	2	Zein El Abdin Youssef	United Arab Republic	22.9	
6	2	Mounir Zeitoun	Lebanon	23.6	

Final – 22 October

Rank	Name	Nationality	Time	Notes
1st place, gold medalist(s)	Paul Genevay	France	20.9	
2nd place, silver medalist(s)	Nikolaos Georgopoulos	Greece	21.5	
3rd place, bronze medalist(s)	Bernard Cahen	France	21.8	
4	Leonidas Kormalis	Greece	22.1	
5	Ioannis Komitoudis	Greece	22.1	
6	José Luis Albarran	Spain	22.4	

=== 400 meters ===
Heats – 20 October

Rank	Heat	Name	Nationality	Time	Notes
1	1	Viktor Šnajder	Yugoslavia	48.8	Q
2	1	Jean-Pierre Goudeau	France	49.2	Q
3	1	Jesús Rancaño	Spain	49.9	
4	1	Abdel Moneim Abdallah	United Arab Republic	50.0	
5	1	Saleh Nasser	Lebanon	55.0	
1	2	Jean Bertozzi	France	49.5	Q
2	2	José Luis Martínez	Spain	49.7	Q
3	2	Tadros Farouk	United Arab Republic	50.4	
4	2	Garo Kazandijan	Lebanon	54.3	
1	3	Hassan El Din Ahmed Ragab	United Arab Republic	49.1	Q
2	3	Vassilios Sillis	Greece	50.2	Q
3	3	Fahir Özgüden	Turkey	51.7	
4	3	Michel Tawil	Lebanon	54.0	

Final – 21 October

Rank	Name	Nationality	Time	Notes
1st place, gold medalist(s)	Viktor Šnajder	Yugoslavia	47.1	GR
2nd place, silver medalist(s)	Hassan El Din Ahmed Ragab	United Arab Republic	48.3	
3rd place, bronze medalist(s)	Vassilios Sillis	Greece	48.7	
4	Jean-Pierre Goudeau	France	49.1	
5	Jean Bertozzi	France	49.2	
6	José Luis Martínez	Spain	49.5	

=== 800 meters ===
Heats – 19 October

Rank	Heat	Name	Nationality	Time	Notes
1	1	Pierre-Yvon Lenoir	France	1:54.1	Q
2	1	Elías Reguero	Spain	1:54.9	Q
3	1	Konstantinos Moragiemos	Greece	1:54.9	Q
4	1	Abdeslem Dargouth	Tunisia	1:55.5	
5	1	Mohamed Abdul Magd Omar	United Arab Republic	1:58.5	
1	2	Tomás Barris	Spain	1:54.5	Q
2	2	Evangelos Depastas	Greece	1:54.5	Q
3	2	Muharrem Dalkılıç	Turkey	1:55.2	Q
4	2	Mohamed Radouan Raghoan	United Arab Republic	1:56.0	
5	2	Mohamed Reguib	Morocco	2:05.0	

Final – 20 October

Rank	Name	Nationality	Time	Notes
1st place, gold medalist(s)	Pierre-Yvon Lenoir	France	1:55.4	
2nd place, silver medalist(s)	Tomás Barris	Spain	1:55.8	
3rd place, bronze medalist(s)	Evangelos Depastas	Greece	1:56.1	
4	Konstantinos Moragiemos	Greece	1:56.7	
5	Elías Reguero	Spain	1:57.5	
	Muharrem Dalkılıç	Turkey	DNF	

=== 1500 meters ===
22 October

Rank	Name	Nationality	Time	Notes
1st place, gold medalist(s)	Tomás Barris	Spain	3:50.6	
2nd place, silver medalist(s)	Jean Clausse	France	3:51.8	
3rd place, bronze medalist(s)	Evangelos Depastas	Greece	3:52.6	
4	Muharrem Dalkılıç	Turkey	3:53.4	
5	Abdeslem Dargouth	Tunisia	3:59.2	
6	Mohamed Abdul Magd Omar	United Arab Republic	4:00.1	
7	Samir Nassar	Lebanon	?:??.?	

=== 5000 meters ===
21 October

Rank	Name	Nationality	Time	Notes
1st place, gold medalist(s)	Robert Bogey	France	14:31.0	
2nd place, silver medalist(s)	Luis García	Spain	14:32.6	
3rd place, bronze medalist(s)	Carlos Pérez	Spain	14:45.0	
4	Salah Beddiaf	France	14:47.6	
5	Said Ben Mohamed Gerouani	Morocco	15:05.2	
6	Ahmed Ben Salem Boughalem	Tunisia	15:12.0	
7	Mahmoud Saleh Al-Rachidi	United Arab Republic	15:12.8	
8	Fathi Atta Khalifa	United Arab Republic	15:13.2	
9	Şükrü Şaban	Turkey	15:23.2	
10	Fevzi Pakel	Turkey	15:35.4	
11	Spyros Kontos	Greece	15:37.8	
12	Ahmed Dali Labibi	Tunisia	16:01.4	
13	Moussa Aly El Hajje	Lebanon	16:21.6	

=== 10,000 meters ===
19 October

Rank	Name	Nationality	Time	Notes
1st place, gold medalist(s)	Hamoud Ameur	France	30:19.2	
2nd place, silver medalist(s)	Saïd Ben Mohamed Gerouani	Morocco	30:22.4	
3rd place, bronze medalist(s)	Luis García	Spain	30:24.2	
4	Carlos Pérez	Spain	30:41.4	
5	Salah Beddiaf	France	30:42.6	
6	Bachir Benaïssa	Morocco	31:18.4	
7	Georgios Papavasileiou	Greece	31:24.0	
8	Fathi Atta Khalifa	United Arab Republic	31:34.6	
9	Ahmed Ben Salem Boughalem	Tunisia	31:57.4	
10	Şükrü Şaban	Turkey	32:02.0	
11	Mahmoud Saleh Al-Rachidi	United Arab Republic	32:02.2	
12	Spyros Kontos	Greece	32:02.2	
13	Ahmed Dali Labibi	Tunisia	32:24.2	
14	Moussa Aly El Hajje	Lebanon	35:02.0	

=== Marathon ===
22 October

Rank	Name	Nationality	Time	Notes
1st place, gold medalist(s)	Bakir Benaïssa	Morocco	2:24:15	GR
2nd place, silver medalist(s)	Miguel Navarro	Spain	2:27:28	NR
3rd place, bronze medalist(s)	Mahmoud Abdelkrim	United Arab Republic	2:35:04	
4	Farag Salem Farag	United Arab Republic	2:35:25	
5	Ahmet Aytar	Turkey	2:39:18	
6	Ali Hamed Ahmed	United Arab Republic	2:40:15	
7	Aydar Erturan	Turkey	2:40:15	
8	Mohamed El Outa	Lebanon	3:25:00	

=== 110 meters hurdles ===
Heats – 21 October

Rank	Heat	Name	Nationality	Time	Notes
1	1	Georgios Marsellos	Greece	14.8	Q
2	1	Abdel Mohamed Abdallah	United Arab Republic	14.9	Q
3	1	Maurice Fournier	France	15.6	Q
4	1	Kheir El Dine Rameh	Lebanon	16.2	
1	2	Marcel Duriez	France	14.4	Q
2	2	Emilio Campra	Spain	14.9	Q
3	2	Dimitrios Skourtis	Greece	15.4	Q
4	2	Ahmed Atef Abdallah	United Arab Republic	15.4	

Final – 22 October

Rank	Name	Nationality	Time	Notes
1st place, gold medalist(s)	Georgios Marsellos	Greece	14.5	GR
2nd place, silver medalist(s)	Marcel Duriez	France	14.5	
3rd place, bronze medalist(s)	Emilio Campra	Spain	15.4	
4	Abdel Mohamed Abdallah	United Arab Republic	15.4	
5	Maurice Fournier	France	15.5	
6	Dimitrios Skourtis	Greece	15.8	

=== 400 meters hurdles ===
Heats – 19 October

Rank	Heat	Name	Nationality	Time	Notes
1	1	Fahir Özgüden	Turkey	55.0	Q
2	1	Abdel Mohamed Abdallah	United Arab Republic	55.4	Q
3	1	Alexandros Froussios	Greece	55.4	Q
4	1	Bernardino Lombao	Spain	55.6	
5	1	Michel Tawil	Lebanon	58.7	
1	2	Dimitrios Skourtis	Greece	55.4	Q
2	2	Mohamed Darwiche Zaki	United Arab Republic	55.5	Q
3	2	Mongi Soussi Zarrouki	Tunisia	55.6	Q
4	2	Mohamed Zouaki	Morocco	57.9	
5	2	Saleh Nasser	Lebanon	1:02.1	

Final – 20 October

Rank	Name	Nationality	Time	Notes
1st place, gold medalist(s)	Fahir Özgüden	Turkey	53.4	
2nd place, silver medalist(s)	Mongi Soussi Zarrouki	Tunisia	54.1	
3rd place, bronze medalist(s)	Abdel Mohamed Abdallah	United Arab Republic	54.4	
4	Mohamed Darwiche Zaki	United Arab Republic	54.9	
5	Dimitrios Skourtis	Greece	55.0	
6	Alexandros Froussios	Greece	58.8	

=== 3000 meters steeplechase ===
22 October

Rank	Name	Nationality	Time	Notes
1st place, gold medalist(s)	Georgios Papavasileiou	Greece	9:04.0	GR
2nd place, silver medalist(s)	Manuel Alonso	Spain	9:06.2	
3rd place, bronze medalist(s)	Franc Hafner	Yugoslavia	9:09.6	
4	Hamoud Ameur	France	9:11.6	

=== 4 × 100 meters relay ===
21 October

Rank	Nation	Competitors	Time	Notes
1st place, gold medalist(s)	France	Bernard Cahen, Alain David, Paul Genevay, Ali Brakchi	41.5	
2nd place, silver medalist(s)	Greece	Ioannis Komitoudis, Constantin Lolos, Leonidas Kormalis, Nikolaos Georgopoulos	41.7	
3rd place, bronze medalist(s)	Spain	Emilio Campra, José Luis Martínez, Jesús Rancaño, José Luis Albarran	42.2	NR
4	United Arab Republic	Mohamed Saïd Zaki, Hassan El Din Ahmed Ragab, Zein El Abdin Youssef, Taissir Abdulai Suleiman	43.4	
5	Lebanon	M. Nasrallah, Fouad Nasrallah, Abdul Halim Karakallah, Mounir Zeitoun	45.5	

=== 4 × 400 meters relay ===
22 October

Rank	Nation	Competitors	Time	Notes
1st place, gold medalist(s)	Greece	Leonidas Kormalis, Konstantinos Moragiemos, Nikolaos Georgopoulos, Vassilios Sillis	3:15.0	
2nd place, silver medalist(s)	France	Paul Genevay, Jean-Pierre Goudeau, Jean Bertozzi, Pierre-Yvon Lenoir	3:15.4	
3rd place, bronze medalist(s)	United Arab Republic	Farouk Tadros, Rachoui, Abdel Moneim Abdallah, Hassan El Din Ahmed Ragab	3:17.6	
4	Spain	Bernardino Lombao, José Luis Martínez, Jesús Rancaño, Elias Requero	3:17.6	
5	Morocco	Ben Taber, Bougaib M'Rak, Mohamed Reguib, Said	3:25.1	

=== 20 kilometers walk ===
Rank	Name	Nationality	Time	Notes
1st place, gold medalist(s)	Pierre Attane	France	1:43:17	
2nd place, silver medalist(s)	Stavros Hatzilaios	Greece	1:50:19	

=== High jump ===
20 October

Rank	Name	Nationality	Result	Notes
1st place, gold medalist(s)	Maurice Fournier	France	1.99	
2nd place, silver medalist(s)	Çetin Şahiner	Turkey	1.96	
3rd place, bronze medalist(s)	Michel Hermann	France	1.90	
4	Marc Rabémila	France	1.90	
5	Sylvain Bitan	Tunisia	1.90	
6	Ioannis Koinis	Greece	1.85	
7	Sami El Ahmar	Lebanon	1.85	
8	Hassan Nassif	United Arab Republic	1.80	

=== Pole vault ===
22 October

Rank	Name	Nationality	Result	Notes
1st place, gold medalist(s)	Rigas Efstathiadis	Greece	4.10	
2nd place, silver medalist(s)	Fernando Adarraga	Spain	3.80	
3rd place, bronze medalist(s)	Farid Hanna	United Arab Republic	3.80	
4	Mohamed Saïd Zaki	United Arab Republic	3.70	
5	Ahmed Adam	Lebanon	3.50	
6	Abdul Halim Karakallah	Lebanon	3.40	

=== Long jump ===
21 October

Rank	Name	Nationality	Result	Notes
1st place, gold medalist(s)	Ali Brakchi	France	7.59	
2nd place, silver medalist(s)	Dimosthenis Magglaras	Greece	7.44	
3rd place, bronze medalist(s)	Manuel González	Spain	7.24	
4	Teymurlenk Shukri	United Arab Republic	7.06	
5	Aristidis Kazantzidis	Greece	7.02	
6	Éric Battista	France	6.80	
7	Michel Hermann	France	6.33	
8	Fouad Nasrallah	Lebanon	6.09	

=== Triple jump ===
19 October

Rank	Name	Nationality	Result	Notes
1st place, gold medalist(s)	Éric Battista	France	15.82	
2nd place, silver medalist(s)	Marc Rabémila	France	15.47	
3rd place, bronze medalist(s)	Mahmoud Atef Abdel Fattah	United Arab Republic	15.04	
4	Konstantinos Sfikas	Greece	14.69	
5	Hassan Mohamed Sourour	United Arab Republic	14.43	
6	Abbas El Masri	Lebanon	12.76	

=== Shot put ===
21 October

Rank	Name	Nationality	Result	Notes
1st place, gold medalist(s)	Georgios Tsakanikas	Greece	16.97	
2nd place, silver medalist(s)	Antonios Kounadis	Greece	15.12	
3rd place, bronze medalist(s)	Chebel Hassan Farag	United Arab Republic	14.95	
4	Salem El Djirs	Lebanon	14.36	
5	Mohamed Ali Abdul Oneim	United Arab Republic	13.91	

=== Discus throw ===
20 October

Rank	Name	Nationality	Result	Notes
1st place, gold medalist(s)	Antonios Kounadis	Greece	55.02	
2nd place, silver medalist(s)	Dako Radošević	Yugoslavia	54.01	
3rd place, bronze medalist(s)	Giorgios Tsakanikas	Greece	47.88	
4	Dimitrios Karaflas	Greece	45.88	
5	Chebel Hassan Farag	United Arab Republic	45.71	
6	Afif Boutros	Lebanon	42.04	
7	Abadallah Haffez	United Arab Republic	40.24	
8	Iskandar Saker	Lebanon	39.53	

=== Hammer throw ===
19 October

Rank	Name	Nationality	Result	Notes
1st place, gold medalist(s)	Krešimir Račić	Yugoslavia	62.26	
2nd place, silver medalist(s)	Frangiskos Politis	Greece	55.44	
3rd place, bronze medalist(s)	Andreas Kouvelogiannis	Greece	53.31	
4	Michel Skaff	Lebanon	40.42	
5	Fabel El Hadji	Lebanon	36.98	

=== Javelin throw ===
22 October

Rank	Name	Nationality	Result	Notes
1st place, gold medalist(s)	Léon Syrovatski	France	74.10	
2nd place, silver medalist(s)	Božidar Miletić	Yugoslavia	73.80	
3rd place, bronze medalist(s)	Myron Anifantakis	Greece	68.80	
4	Mahmod Mohamed Mahmoud	United Arab Republic	63.53	
5	Mohamed Atef Ismail	United Arab Republic	58.00	
6	Afif Boutros	Lebanon	52.97	
7	Elie Makhoul	Lebanon	50.88	

=== Decathlon ===
17–18 October

The highest mark recorded in each event is highlighted in yellow

Rank	Athlete	Nationality	100m	LJ	SP	HJ	400m	110m H	DT	PV	JT	1500m	Points	Notes
1st place, gold medalist(s)	Jože Brodnik	Yugoslavia	11.5	6.43	13.19	1.70	52.0	15.6	39.00	3.95	64.08	4:46.8	6581	
2nd place, silver medalist(s)	Georgios Marsellos	Greece	11.3	6.79	11.42	1.87	54.8	14.7	35.07	3.20	46.08	5:11.1	5908	
3rd place, bronze medalist(s)	Mohamed Saïd Zaki	United Arab Republic	11.1	6.68	11.47	1.65	50.4	16.6	36.65	3.70	45.50	5:04.6	5816	
4	Aydin Onur	Turkey	10.9	6.65	11.50	1.60	53.6	18.6	32.66	3.80	40.25	4:47.0	5357	
	Abdallah Habrachi	United Arab Republic	12.2	6.39	9.18	1.65	54.8	?	–	–	–	–	DNF	
