= Athletics at the 1959 Summer Universiade – Men's 4 × 100 metres relay =

The men's 4 × 100 metres relay event at the 1959 Summer Universiade was held at the Stadio Comunale di Torino in Turin on 6 September 1959.

== Results ==
=== Heats ===
Rank	Heat	Nation	Athletes	Time	Notes
1	1	Italy	Guido De Murtas, Salvatore Giannone, Giorgio Mazza, Livio Berruti	41.2	Q
2	1	Poland	Bogusław Gierajewski, Janusz Ludka, Jerzy Pilaczyński, Jan Cholewa	42.5	Q
3	1	Great Britain	Brian Anson, Jim Railton, Archie MacDonald, Ian Taylor	42.8	Q
4	1	Belgium	Romain Poté, Gaston Knockaert, Julien De Decker, Jean-Pierre Barra	43.3	
1	2	West Germany	Rudolf Sundermann, Martin Reichert, Burkhart Quantz, Fritz Helfrich	41.6	Q
2	2	France	Ali Brakchi, Joël Caprice, Jean-Claude Penez, Guy Lagorce	41.6	Q
3	2	Japan	Hiroshi Shibata, Yoshiaki Osada, Koji Sakurai, Norihiko Kubo	42.6	Q
4	2	Greece	Giorgos Katsibardis, Dimitrios Skourtis, Georgios Marsellos, Nikolaos Georgopoulos	43.3	
5	2	Pakistan	Iftikhar Shah, Mohd, Farooq, Tahir	43.6	

=== Final ===
Rank	Nation	Athletes	Time	Notes
1st place, gold medalist(s)	Italy	Guido De Murtas, Salvatore Giannone, Giorgio Mazza, Livio Berruti	41.0	
2nd place, silver medalist(s)	West Germany	Rudolf Sundermann, Martin Reichert, Burkhart Quantz, Fritz Helfrich	41.0	
3rd place, bronze medalist(s)	France	Ali Brakchi, Joël Caprice, Jean-Claude Penez, Guy Lagorce	41.4	
4	Great Britain	Brian Anson, Jim Railton, Archie MacDonald, Ian Taylor	42.0	
5	Poland	Bogusław Gierajewski, Janusz Ludka, Jerzy Pilaczyński, Jan Cholewa	42.0	
6	Japan	Hiroshi Shibata, Yoshiaki Osada, Koji Sakurai, Norihiko Kubo	42.3	
