= Japan at the 1959 Summer Universiade =

- IOC code: JPN
- NOC: Japanese Olympic Committee
- Website: www.joc.or.jp/english/ (in English)

in Turin, Italy 26 August – 7 September 1959
- Competitors: 22
- Medals Ranked 9th: Gold 2 Silver 2 Bronze 3 Total 7

Summer Universiade appearances (overview)
- 1959; 1961; 1963; 1965; 1967; 1970; 1973; 1975; 1977; 1979; 1981; 1983; 1985; 1987; 1989; 1991; 1993; 1995; 1997; 1999; 2001; 2003; 2005; 2007; 2009; 2011; 2013; 2015; 2017; 2019; 2021; 2025; 2027

Japan participated at the 1959 Summer Universiade, in Turin, Italy. Japan finished ninth in the medal table with 2 gold medals, 2 silver medals, and 3 bronze medals.

== Background ==
In this first edition of the Universiade, Japan sent 22 athletes led by JOC member Kiyoshi Kitazawa. The nation participates in three sports: athletics, fencing, and tennis. Even though the number of athletes was small, pole vaulter Noriaki Yasuda and men's tennis doubles players Masao Nagasaki and Takeo Hanna managed to win gold medals.

== Medal summary ==
=== Medalists ===
Medal	Name	Sport	Event	Date
Gold	Takeo Hanna; Masao Nagasaki	Tennis	Men's doubles	August 31
Gold	Noriaki Yasuda	Athletics	Men's pole vault	September 4
Silver	Koji Sakurai	Athletics	Men's triple jump	September 5
Silver	Saburo Yokomizo	Athletics	Men's 5000 m	September 6
Bronze	Kuniaki Watanabe	Athletics	Men's 800 m	September 4
Bronze	Hiroshi Shibata	Athletics	Men's triple jump	September 5
Bronze	Kuniaki Watanabe	Athletics	Men's 1500 m	September 6

=== Medals by sport ===
Medals by sport
Sport	1st place, gold medalist(s)	2nd place, silver medalist(s)	3rd place, bronze medalist(s)	Total
Athletics	1	2	3	6
Tennis	1	0	0	1
Total	2	2	3	7
