= Athletics at the 1959 Summer Universiade – Men's long jump =

The men's long jump event at the 1959 Summer Universiade was held at the Stadio Comunale di Torino in Turin with the final on 5 and 6 September 1959.

== Medalists ==
Gold	Silver	Bronze
Attilio Bravi; Italy	Maurizio Terenziani; Italy	Ali Brakchi; France

== Results ==
=== Qualification ===
Qualification mark: 6.80 metres

Rank	Athlete	Nationality	Result	Notes
1	Ali Brakchi	France	7.14	Q
2	Maurizio Terenziani	Italy	7.12	Q
3	Ivan Ivanov	Bulgaria	7.11	Q
4	Henryk Marucha	Poland	7.10	Q
5	Witold Gutowski	Poland	7.09	Q
6	Attilio Bravi	Italy	7.07	Q
6	Todor Mitrov	Bulgaria	7.07	Q
8	Romain Poté	Belgium	7.00	Q
9	Ku Keyen	China	6.99	Q
10	Olli-Pekka Hartikainen	Finland	6.99	Q
11	Suh Yong-joo	South Korea	6.98	Q
12	Koji Sakurai	Japan	6.97	Q
13	Albert Hofstede	Netherlands	6.91	Q
14	Branko Miler	Yugoslavia	6.89	Q
15	Hachiro Kawano	Japan	6.87	Q
16	Aristidis Kazantzidis	Greece	6.85	Q
16	Lamine Diack	France	6.85	Q
18	Carlo Stanga	Switzerland	6.83	Q
19	Dietmar Kamper	West Germany	6.77	
20	Desmond Luke	Sierra Leone	6.72	
21	Iftikhar Shah	Pakistan	6.63	
22	Bolajedi Kuti	Nigeria	6.51	
23	Arnold Klaassen	Netherlands	6.11	
24	Kim Jong-chul	South Korea	4.87	

=== Final ===
Rank	Name	Nationality	Result	Notes
1st place, gold medalist(s)	Attilio Bravi	Italy	7.46	
2nd place, silver medalist(s)	Maurizio Terenziani	Italy	7.43	
3rd place, bronze medalist(s)	Ali Brakchi	France	7.42	
4	Ivan Ivanov	Bulgaria	7.40	
5	Henryk Marucha	Poland	7.33	
6	Branko Miler	Yugoslavia	7.25	
7	Suh Yong-joo	South Korea	7.25	
8	Romain Poté	Belgium	7.16	
9	Olli-Pekka Hartikainen	Finland	7.13	
10	Todor Mitrov	Bulgaria	7.10	
11	Witold Gutowski	Poland	7.06	
12	Carlo Stanga	Switzerland	6.99	
13	Aristidis Kazantzidis	Greece	6.97	
14	Koji Sakurai	Japan	6.87	
15	Ku Keyen	China	6.71	
16	Albert Hofstede	Netherlands	6.65	
	Hachiro Kawano	Japan	NM	
	Lamine Diack	France	?	
