= Athletics at the 1959 Summer Universiade – Men's 200 metres =

The men's 200 metres event at the 1959 Summer Universiade was held at the Stadio Comunale di Torino in Turin on 5 and 6 September 1959.

== Medalists ==
Gold	Silver	Bronze
Livio Berruti; Italy	Nikolaos Georgopoulos; Greece	Fritz Helfrich; West Germany

== Results ==
=== Heats ===
Rank	Heat	Athlete	Nationality	Time	Notes
1	1	Livio Berruti	Italy	22.2	Q
2	1	Archie MacDonald	Great Britain	22.4	Q
3	1	T. Ludwig	Luxembourg	23.8	Q
4	1	Mohamed Haddad	Tunisia	23.9	
1	2	Nikolaos Georgopoulos	Greece	21.9	Q
2	2	Brian Anson	Great Britain	22.2	Q
3	2	Guy Lagorce	France	22.5	Q
4	2	Paul Sahl	Luxembourg	22.7	
5	2	Hahir	Pakistan	23.0	
1	3	Salvatore Giannone	Italy	21.9	Q
2	3	Rainald Bohnhoff	West Germany	22.2	Q
3	3	Meyer	Pakistan	23.7	Q
4	3	Mounir Zeitoun	Lebanon	24.1	
1	4	Jan Cholewa	Poland	23.0	Q
2	4	Hayder	Tunisia	23.7	Q
3	4	Molarinho Carmo	Portugal	24.2	Q
1	5	Fritz Helfrich	West Germany	22.1	Q
2	5	Jerzy Pilaczyński	Poland	22.5	Q
3	5	Giorgos Katsibardis	Greece	22.6	Q
4	5	Chen Jiaquan	China	22.6	
1	6	Guy Robert	France	22.3	Q
2	6	Norihiko Kubo	Japan	22.4	Q
3	6	Kim	South Korea	22.4	Q

=== Semifinals ===
Rank	Heat	Athlete	Nationality	Time	Notes
1	1	Livio Berruti	Italy	21.5	Q
2	1	Fritz Helfrich	West Germany	22.0	Q
3	1	Giorgos Katsibardis	Greece	22.5	
4	1	Molarinho Carmo	Portugal	23.4	
5	1	Kim	South Korea	23.9	
1	2	Nikolaos Georgopoulos	Greece	22.0	Q
2	2	Guy Lagorce	France	22.1	Q
3	2	Archie MacDonald	Great Britain	22.3	
4	2	Rainald Bohnhoff	West Germany	22.3	
5	2	Norihiko Kubo	Japan	22.5	
6	2	Hayder	Tunisia	23.4	
1	3	Salvatore Giannone	Italy	21.9	Q
2	3	Brian Anson	Great Britain	22.0	Q
3	3	Andrzej Pilaczyński	Poland	22.2	
4	3	Guy Robert	France	22.9	
5	3	Meyer	Pakistan	23.5	
	?	T. Ludwig	Luxembourg	?	

=== Final ===
Rank	Name	Nationality	Time	Notes
1st place, gold medalist(s)	Livio Berruti	Italy	20.9	
2nd place, silver medalist(s)	Nikolaos Georgopoulos	Greece	21.6	
3rd place, bronze medalist(s)	Fritz Helfrich	West Germany	21.7	
4	Salvatore Giannone	Italy	21.7	
5	Guy Lagorce	France	21.7	
6	Brian Anson	Great Britain	21.8	
