= Athletics at the 1959 Summer Universiade – Men's 100 metres =

The men's 100 metres event at the 1959 Summer Universiade was held at the Stadio Comunale di Torino in Turin on 3 and 4 September 1959.

== Medalists ==
Gold	Silver	Bronze
Livio Berruti; Italy	Jean-Claude Penez; France	Romain Poté; Belgium

== Results ==
=== Heats ===
Rank	Heat	Athlete	Nationality	Time	Notes
1	1	Romain Poté	Belgium	10.8	Q
2	1	Jean-Claude Penez	France	10.8	Q
3	1	Bogusław Gierajewski	Poland	11.1	Q
4	1	Albert Hofstede	Netherlands	11.4	
1	2	Norihiko Kubo	Japan	11.0	Q
2	2	Osman Tahir	Pakistan	11.4	Q
3	2	Hayder	Tunisia	11.5	Q
4	2	Mounir Zeitoun	Lebanon	11.5	
	2	Kim	South Korea	DQ	
1	3	Livio Berruti	Italy	10.7	Q
2	3	Andrzej Pilaczyński	Poland	11.1	Q
3	3	T. Ludwig	Luxembourg	11.2	Q
3	3	Iftikhar Shah	Pakistan	11.2	
1	4	Jim Railton	Great Britain	11.0	Q
2	4	Nikolaos Georgopoulos	Greece	11.1	Q
3	4	Guido De Murtas	Italy	11.1	Q
4	4	Molarinho Carmo	Portugal	11.6	
1	5	Rudolf Sundermann	West Germany	10.8	Q
2	5	Carlos Frasca	Brazil	11.1	Q
3	5	Georgios Katsimbardis	Greece	11.3	Q
4	5	Ian Taylor	Great Britain	11.4	
1	6	Joël Caprice	France	10.9	Q
2	6	Martin Reichert	West Germany	11.1	Q
3	6	Yoshiaki Osada	Japan	11.1	Q
4	6	Heinz Bösiger	Switzerland	11.4	
5	6	Jean-Pierre Barra	Belgium	11.4	

=== Semifinals ===
Rank	Heat	Athlete	Nationality	Time	Notes
1	1	Livio Berruti	Italy	10.5	Q
2	1	Jim Railton	Great Britain	10.5	Q
3	1	Carlos Frasca	Brazil	10.9	
4	1	Yoshiaki Osada	Japan	10.9	
5	1	Georgios Katsimbardis	Greece	11.0	
6	1	Bogusław Gierajewski	Poland	11.1	
1	2	Jean-Claude Penez	France	10.7	Q
2	2	Guido De Murtas	Italy	10.9	Q
3	2	Martin Reichert	West Germany	11.0	
4	2	Nikolaos Georgopoulos	Greece	11.0	
5	2	Norihiko Kubo	Japan	11.1	
6	2	Hayder	Tunisia	11.6	
1	3	Romain Poté	Belgium	10.7	Q
2	3	Joël Caprice	France	10.8	Q
3	3	Andrzej Pilaczyński	Poland	10.9	
4	3	Rudolf Sundermann	West Germany	10.9	
5	3	T. Ludwig	Luxembourg	11.2	
6	3	Osman Tahir	Pakistan	11.3	

=== Final ===
Rank	Name	Nationality	Time	Notes
1st place, gold medalist(s)	Livio Berruti	Italy	10.5	
2nd place, silver medalist(s)	Jean-Claude Penez	France	10.8	
3rd place, bronze medalist(s)	Romain Poté	Belgium	10.8	
4	Joël Caprice	France	10.8	
5	Jim Railton	Great Britain	10.9	
6	Guido De Murtas	Italy	11.0	
