= Athletics at the 1959 Summer Universiade – Men's 110 metres hurdles =

The men's 110 metres hurdles event at the 1959 Summer Universiade was held at the Stadio Comunale di Torino in Turin on 5 and 6 September 1959.

== Medalists ==
Gold	Silver	Bronze
Stanko Lorger; Yugoslavia	Nereo Svara; Italy	Giorgio Mazza; Italy

== Results ==
=== Heats ===
Held on 5 September

Rank	Heat	Athlete	Nationality	Time	Notes
1	1	Giorgio Mazza	Italy	14.5	Q
2	1	Mike Parker	Great Britain	14.9	Q
3	1	Mohamed Haddad	Tunisia	15.8	Q
4	1	Franz Thomet	Switzerland	16.1	
1	2	Nereo Svara	Italy	14.7	Q
2	2	Desmond Price	Great Britain	14.9	Q
3	2	Dieter Moll	West Germany	15.3	Q
4	2	Batista Lopes	Portugal	16.1	
5	2	Mohd	Pakistan	16.3	
1	3	Dimitrios Skourtis	Greece	15.3	Q
2	3	Juhani Orrenmaa	Finland	15.4	Q
1	4	Georgios Marsellos	Greece	15.0	Q
2	4	Ivan Veselský	Czechoslovakia	15.1	Q
3	4	Emilio Campra	Spain	15.3	Q
1	5	Gao Jiqiao	China	14.6	Q
2	5	Wiesław Król	Poland	14.8	Q
3	5	Carlos Mossa	Brazil	14.9	Q
1	6	Stanko Lorger	Yugoslavia	14.4	Q
2	6	Jean-Claude Reynaud	France	14.7	Q
3	6	John Duncan	Nigeria	14.8	Q
4	6	Victor Cinca	Romania	15.3	

=== Semifinals ===
Held on 6 September

Rank	Heat	Athlete	Nationality	Time	Notes
1	1	Stanko Lorger	Yugoslavia	14.3	Q
2	1	Jean-Claude Reynaud	France	14.7	Q
3	1	Wiesław Król	Poland	14.7	
4	1	Mike Parker	Great Britain	15.0	
5	1	Emilio Campra	Spain	15.2	
6	1	Dimitrios Skourtis	Greece	15.3	
1	2	Giorgio Mazza	Italy	14.4	Q
2	2	Gao Jiqiao	China	14.5	Q
3	2	Ivan Veselský	Czechoslovakia	14.6	
4	2	Desmond Price	Great Britain	14.6	
5	2	Juhani Orrenmaa	Finland	15.3	
6	2	Mohamed Haddad	Tunisia	15.8	
1	3	Nereo Svara	Italy	14.3	Q, 0.0
2	3	Carlos Mossa	Brazil	14.5	Q
3	3	Georgios Marsellos	Greece	14.7	
4	3	John Duncan	Nigeria	15.1	
5	3	Dieter Moll	West Germany	15.4	

=== Final ===
Held on 6 September

Rank	Name	Nationality	Time	Notes
1st place, gold medalist(s)	Stanko Lorger	Yugoslavia	14.2	
2nd place, silver medalist(s)	Nereo Svara	Italy	14.4	
3rd place, bronze medalist(s)	Giorgio Mazza	Italy	14.4	
4	Gao Jiqiao	China	14.6	
5	Carlos Mossa	Brazil	14.7	
6	Jean-Claude Reynaud	France	15.1	
