= Athletics at the 1957 World University Games – Men's triple jump =

The men's triple jump event at the 1957 World University Games was held at the Stadium Charlety in Paris with the final on 6 September 1957.

== Medalists ==
Gold	Silver	Bronze
Oleg Ryakhovskiy; Soviet Union	Éric Battista; France	Kari Rahkamo; Finland

== Results ==
=== Final ===
Rank	Name	Nationality	#1	#2	#3	#4	#5	#6	Result	Notes
1st place, gold medalist(s)	Oleg Ryakhovskiy	Soviet Union	15.29	15.53	15.59	15.63	15.70	16.01	16.01	
2nd place, silver medalist(s)	Éric Battista	France	15.22	15.08	15.22	15.38	15.78	15.33	15.78	
3rd place, bronze medalist(s)	Kari Rahkamo	Finland	14.84	x	x	x	15.38	x	15.38	
4	Hiroshi Shibata	Japan	x	14.62	15.10	x	x	x	15.10	
5	Koji Sakurai	Japan	14.36	14.87	x	12.27	14.81	13.15	14.87	
6	Radoslav Jocić	Yugoslavia	x	14.76	13.19	14.50	x	14.65	14.76	
7	Jean Humbert	France							14.68	
8	Roger Page	France							14.23	
9	Hugh Murray	Great Britain							14.03	
10	Delcourt	Belgium							13.32	
11	Ravyts	Belgium							13.21	
