= Athletics at the 1959 Summer Universiade – Men's triple jump =

The men's triple jump event at the 1959 Summer Universiade was held at the Stadio Comunale di Torino in Turin on 5 September 1959.

== Results ==
Rank	Name	Nationality	Result	Notes
1st place, gold medalist(s)	Oleg Ryakhovskiy	Soviet Union	15.74	
2nd place, silver medalist(s)	Koji Sakurai	Japan	15.55	
3rd place, bronze medalist(s)	Hiroshi Shibata	Japan	15.44	
4	Éric Battista	France	15.35	
5	Pierluigi Gatti	Italy	15.14	
6	Witold Gutowski	Poland	15.03	
7	Kari Rahkamo	Finland	14.96	
8	Giorgio Bortolozzi	Italy	14.83	
9	Ku Keyen	China	14.44	
10	Albert Hofstede	Netherlands	14.42	
11	Peter Parnitzke	West Germany	14.01	
