= Viktor Šnajder =

Croatian sprinter

Personal information
- Born: 17 June 1934 Đakovo, Yugoslavia
- Died: 14 November 2014 (aged 80) Zagreb, Croatia

Sport
- Sport: Track and field
Medal record
Representing Yugoslavia
Mediterranean Games
Gold medal – first place	1959 Beirut	400m
Summer Universiade
Gold medal – first place	1959 Turin	400m

Viktor Šnajder (17 June 1934 – 14 November 2014) was a Croatian sprinter who competed for SFR Yugoslavia in the 1960 Summer Olympics.

Šnajder was born in Đakovo and moved to Zagreb in 1957. He obtained a Ph.D. and was a full professor at the Faculty of Kinesiology, University of Zagreb.
