= Georgios Tsakanikas =

Greek shot putter and discus thrower

Personal information
- Nationality: Greek
- Born: November 10, 1934 Faliro, Greece
- Died: March 1, 2016 (aged 81) Athens, Greece

Sport
- Sport: Athletics
- Events: Shot put, discus throw
Medal record
Representing Greece
Mediterranean Games
| Gold medal – first place | 1959 Beirut | Shot put |
| Silver medal – second place | 1955 Barcelona | Shot put |
| Bronze medal – third place | 1959 Beirut | Discus throw |
Summer Universiade
| Bronze medal – third place | 1959 Turin | Shot put |

Georgios Tsakanikas (Greek: Γεώργιος Τσακανίκας; 10 November 1934 – 1 March 2016) was a Greek shot putter and discus thrower. He was named the 1961 Greek Athlete of the Year.

Tsakanikas won a gold medal in the 1959 Mediterranean Games and a bronze medal in the 1959 Summer Universiade in shot put. He also represented Greece in the 1956, 1960 and 1964 Summer Olympic Games in shot put and in 1964 in discus throw. Tsakanikas also competed tor Greece in the Balkan Games winning four silver medals in shot put in 1955, 1957, 1959, 1960 and 1961. The "Balkan Games" have become a loose collection of Balkan Championships. Tsakanikas' personal best in shot put is 18.21 m. achieved on 26 December 1964 in Athens. He died in Athens, March 1, 2016.
