= Antonios Kounadis =

Greek discus thrower and academic

Personal information
- Born: 20 April 1937 (age 89) Athens, Greece

Sport
- Sport: Track and field
Medal record
Representing Greece
Mediterranean Games
Gold medal – first place	1959 Beirut	Discus throw
Summer Universiade
Gold medal – first place	1959 Turin	Discus throw

Antonios or Anthony Kounadis (Greek: Αντώνιος Κουνάδης; born 20 April 1937) is a discus thrower, civil engineer, scholar and academician from Greece. He was President of the Academy of Athens for the year 2018. He was named the 1959 Greek Athlete of the Year.

== Sport career ==
Kounadis was born in Athens. He represented his native country at the 1960 Summer Olympics in Rome, Italy, where he ended up in 18th place in the overall-rankings. Kounadis is best known for having won the gold medal in the men's discus event at the 1959 Summer Universiade and at the 1959 Mediterranean Games.

== Academic career ==
A professor of civil engineering at the National Technical University of Athens (NTUA), he was elected in 1999 a full member of the Academy of Athens. He was Vice-President of the Academy of Athens for the year 2017, and President for the year 2018.
