= Athletics at the 1959 Summer Universiade – Men's pole vault =

The men's pole vault event at the 1959 Summer Universiade was held at the Stadio Comunale di Torino in Turin on 3 and 4 September 1959.

== Medalists ==
Gold	Silver	Bronze
Noriaki Yasuda; Japan	Mirko Kuzmanović; Yugoslavia	Bernard Balastre; France

== Results ==
=== Qualification ===
Rank	Heat	Athlete	Nationality	Result	Notes
?	?	Igor Petrenko	Soviet Union	3.70	
?	?	Helmut Schmidt	West Germany	3.70	
?	?	Wolfgang Mayer	West Germany	3.70	
?	?	Noriaki Yasuda	Japan	3.70	
?	?	Paul Van Loo	Belgium	3.70	
?	?	Fernando Adarraga	Spain	3.70	
?	?	Peter Grunder	Switzerland	3.70	
?	?	István Török	Hungary	3.70	
?	?	Jiří Trmal	Czechoslovakia	3.70	
?	?	Christian Ramadier	France	3.70	
?	?	Mirko Kuzmanović	Yugoslavia	3.70	
?	?	Zhang Zhangfa	China	3.70	
?	?	Andrzej Kiełczewski	Poland	3.70	
?	?	Bernard Balastre	France	3.70	

=== Final ===
Rank	Name	Nationality	Result	Notes
1st place, gold medalist(s)	Noriaki Yasuda	Japan	4.35	
2nd place, silver medalist(s)	Mirko Kuzmanović	Yugoslavia	4.30	
3rd place, bronze medalist(s)	Bernard Balastre	France	4.20	
4	István Török	Hungary	4.10	
5	Christian Ramadier	France	4.10	
6	Igor Petrenko	Soviet Union	4.10	
7	Jiří Trmal	Czechoslovakia	4.10	
8	Zhang Zhangfa	China	4.00	
9	Andrzej Kiełczewski	Poland	4.00	
10	Helmut Schmidt	West Germany	3.90	
11	Fernando Adarraga	Spain	3.80	
12	Paul Van Loo	Belgium	3.80	
13	Wolfgang Mayer	West Germany	3.80	
