= Dako Radošević =

Bosnian discus thrower (1934–2021)

Personal information
- Born: 17 August 1934 Bosanska Krupa, Yugoslavia
- Died: 14 August 2021 (aged 86) Sarajevo, Bosnia and Herzegovina

Sport
- Sport: sport
Medal record
Representing Yugoslavia
Mediterranean Games
Gold medal – first place	1963 Naples	Discus throw
Silver medal – second place	1959 Beirut	Discus throw

Dako Radošević (17 August 1934 – 14 August 2021) was a Bosnian discus thrower. He was born in Bosanska Krupa, Yugoslavia and competed for Yugoslavia in the 1956 Summer Olympics and in the 1964 Summer Olympics.
