= Leonidas Kormalis =

Greek sprinter (1932–2003)

Personal information
- Born: 6 November 1932 Athens, Greece
- Died: September 2003 (aged 70)
- Height: 175 cm (5 ft 9 in)
- Weight: 63 kg (139 lb)

Sport
- Country: Greece
- Club: Panathinaikos A.O.
Medal record
Representing Greece
Men's athletics
Mediterranean Games
Gold medal – first place	1959 Beirut	4 × 400m relay
Silver medal – second place	1959 Beirut	4 × 100m relay

Leonidas Kormalis (Greek: Λεωνίδας Κορμάλης; 6 November 1932 – September 2003) was a Greek sprinter. Competing primarily in relay races, he won 13 medals at the Balkan Athletics Championships and two medals at the Mediterranean Games, being part of a Greek champion team in the 4 × 400 metres relay at the 1959 Mediterranean Games. He also competed at the 1960 Summer Olympics and was a national champion pentathlete.

== Biography ==
Kormalis was born on 6 November 1932 in Athens, Greece. He was a member of the clubs AE Emporoipallilon and then Panathinaikos A.O. (PAO), being considered one of the greatest athletes for the latter and a "legend" for them. He was described as a "huge figure" with the club and GreenCorner.gr called him "a particularly fast athlete and one of the best relay runners of all time".

Competing mainly in relay events, Kormalis won many medals at the Balkan Athletics Championships. He was part of a 4 × 400 metres relay team that won gold at the 1953 and 1954 championships, with the team's time in the latter year of 3:17.0 setting the national record and the Balkan record. He won bronze in 1955 and silver in 1956 in the event. He also won the Greek Athletics Championship title in the 400 metres in 1956 with a time of 49.5 seconds. The following year, Kormalis won another national championship, this time in the modern pentathlon. He won bronze at the Balkan championships in 1957 in the 4 × 100 metres relay, and in 1958, he won bronze in both relay events, setting a national record in the 4 × 400.

In 1959, Kormalis won three medals at the Balkan championships: bronze in the 4 × 400m, silver in the 200 metres, and gold in the 4 × 100m, with both relay times setting national records. That year, he had his "greatest success" in athletics, being part of a Greek team that won gold in the 4 × 400m at the 1959 Mediterranean Games with a time of 3:15.0, while also winning a silver at the games in the 4 × 100m with a time of 47.1. In 1960, he won two silver medals at the Balkan championships. Kormalis also competed for Greece at the 1960 Summer Olympics in Rome in two relay events, though he did not medal. He won one further silver medal at the 1962 Balkan championships to conclude his career with 13 Balkan medals (including three gold) and two Mediterranean medals.

Kormalis died in September 2003, at the age of 70.
