= Athletics at the 1959 Summer Universiade – Men's 800 metres =

The men's 800 metres event at the 1959 Summer Universiade was held at the Stadio Comunale di Torino in Turin on 3 and 4 September 1959.

== Medalists ==
Gold	Silver	Bronze
Dieter Heydecke; West Germany	John Holt; Great Britain	Kuniaki Watanabe; Japan

== Results ==
=== Heats ===
Held on 3 September

Rank	Heat	Athlete	Nationality	Time	Notes
1	1	John Holt	Great Britain	1:55.3	Q
2	1	Bolesław Kowalczyk	Poland	1:55.5	Q
3	1	Norbert Haupert	Luxembourg	1:55.5	Q
4	1	Alex Egloff	Switzerland	1:55.6	
5	1	Etienne Vernus	France	1:57.4	
1	2	Rudolf Klaban	Austria	2:06.1	Q
2	2	Thomas Blythe	Great Britain	2:06.1	Q
3	2	Roger Bofferding	Luxembourg	2:06.2	Q
4	2	Ahmad Raad	Iraq	2:13.5	
1	3	Battista Paini	Italy	1:55.1	Q
2	3	Marek Jerzy	Poland	1:55.2	Q
3	3	André Wendling	France	1:55.9	Q
4	3	Michel Lallemand	Belgium	1:57.0	
1	4	Olaf Lawrenz	West Germany	1:53.4	Q
2	4	Traian Sudrigean	Romania	1:53.6	Q
3	4	Tomáš Salinger	Czechoslovakia	1:53.6	Q
4	4	Eric Harder	Switzerland	1:53.6	
1	5	Mario Fraschini	Italy	2:07.3	Q
2	5	Luc Bayens	Belgium	2:07.3	Q
3	5	Hans Johansson	Sweden	2:07.4	Q
1	6	Kuniaki Watanabe	Japan	2:05.3	Q
2	6	Dieter Heydecke	West Germany	2:06.1	Q
3	6	Elías Reguero	Spain	2:06.4	Q

=== Semifinals ===
Held on 4 September

Rank	Heat	Athlete	Nationality	Time	Notes
1	1	Olaf Lawrenz	West Germany	1:51.8	Q
2	1	John Holt	Great Britain	1:52.1	Q
3	1	Mario Fraschini	Italy	1:52.1	
4	1	Marek Jerzy	Poland	1:53.8	
5	1	André Wendling	France	1:55.6	
6	1	Hans Johansson	Sweden	1:56.2	
1	2	Rudolf Klaban	Austria	1:50.8	Q
2	2	Kuniaki Watanabe	Japan	1:51.0	Q
3	2	Tomáš Salinger	Czechoslovakia	1:51.9	
4	2	Traian Sudrigean	Romania	1:55.9	
5	2	Battista Paini	Italy	1:56.4	
6	2	Norbert Haupert	Luxembourg	1:58.8	
1	3	Dieter Heydecke	West Germany	1:51.6	Q
2	3	Thomas Blythe	Great Britain	1:51.9	Q
3	3	Luc Bayens	Belgium	1:53.9	
4	3	Elías Reguero	Spain	1:54.2	
5	3	Roger Bofferding	Luxembourg	1:56.0	
6	3	Bolesław Kowalczyk	Poland	1:57.8	

=== Final ===
Held on 4 September

Rank	Name	Nationality	Time	Notes
1st place, gold medalist(s)	Dieter Heydecke	West Germany	1:50.5	
2nd place, silver medalist(s)	John Holt	Great Britain	1:50.5	
3rd place, bronze medalist(s)	Kuniaki Watanabe	Japan	1:50.9	
4	Thomas Blythe	Great Britain	1:50.9	
5	Olaf Lawrenz	West Germany	1:57.6	
	Rudolf Klaban	Austria	DNS	
