= Mongi Soussi Zarrouki =

Tunisian athlete

Personal information
- Native name: منجي سوسي زروقي
- Nationality: Tunisian
- Born: 24 February 1936 Sbeitla, Tunisia
- Died: 26 May 2000 (aged 64) Paris, France
- Height: 172 cm (5 ft 8 in)
- Weight: 66 kg (146 lb)

Sport
- Country: Tunisia
- Sport: Athletics

Achievements and titles
- Olympic finals: 1960
Medal record
Representing Tunisia
Mediterranean Games
Silver medal – second place	1959 Beirut	400m hurdles

Mongi Soussi Zarrouki (Arabic: منجي سوسي زروقي; 24 February 1936 – 26 May 2000) was a Tunisian track and field athlete. He competed in the 400 metres hurdles events at the 1960 Summer Olympics. He was also the silver medallist in the event at the 1959 Mediterranean Games.

== See also ==
- Tunisia at the 1959 Mediterranean Games
