= Abdoulaye Seye =

French-Senegalese sprinter (1934–2011)

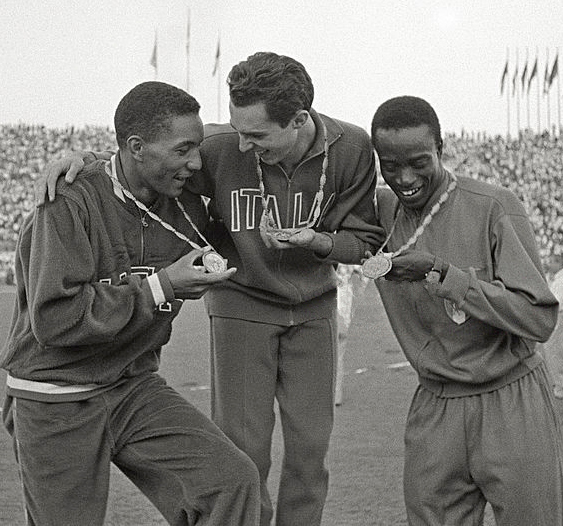
- Abdoulaye Seye (right) at the 1960 Olympics

Personal information
- Born: 30 July 1934 Saint-Louis, Senegal
- Died: 13 October 2011 (aged 77) Thiès, Senegal
- Height: 1.74 m (5 ft 9 in)
- Weight: 68 kg (150 lb)

Sport
- Sport: Athletics
- Event: Sprint
- Club: CASG Paris

Achievements and titles
- Personal best(s): 100 m – 10.32 (10.2) (1960); 200 m – 20.82 (20.7) (1960); 400 – 45.88 (1960)
Medal record
Representing France
Olympic Games
Bronze medal – third place	1960 Rome	200 m
Mediterranean Games
Gold medal – first place	1959 Beirut	100 m

Abdoulaye Seye (30 July 1934 – 13 October 2011) was a Senegalese sprinter. He competed for France at the 1960 Olympics in the 100 m, 200 m and 4 × 100 m relay events and won a bronze medal in the 200 m. Although Senegal had received its independence from France two months ahead of the Olympics as part of the short-lived Mali Federation, in 1960 it still competed as part of France. Seye also won the 100 m gold medal at the 1959 Mediterranean Games.

As a teenager Seye played football for the club Foyer France Senegal, and focused on sprint running only in 1954, during his national service in Toulon. He later won French national titles in the 100 m (1959) and 200 m (1956, 1959) and set national records in the 100 m (1959), 200 m (1959, 1960) and 400 m (1959, 1960).

In 1961, Seye founded the Olympic Committee of Senegal. Between 1961 and 1965 he was the head coach of the national athletics team and later served as adviser to the Senegalese Ministry of Sports.
