= Athletics at the 1959 Summer Universiade – Men's 1500 metres =

The men's 1500 metres event at the 1959 Summer Universiade was held at the Stadio Comunale di Torino in Turin with the final on 5 and 6 September 1959.

== Medalists ==
Gold	Silver	Bronze
Béla Szekeres; Hungary	John Winch; Great Britain	Kuniaki Watanabe; Japan

== Results ==
=== Heats ===
Rank	Heat	Athlete	Nationality	Time	Notes
1	1	Marek Jerzy	Poland	3:59.0	Q
2	1	Sergio Tomatio	Italy	4:00.4	Q
3	1	Kuniaki Watanabe	Japan	4:00.7	Q
4	1	Michel Guilhaumon	France	4:02.8	
1	2	Béla Szekeres	Hungary	3:51.9	Q
2	2	Bolesław Kowalczyk	Poland	3:58.8	Q
3	2	Stephen James	Great Britain	3:58.8	Q
4	2	Fritz Holzer	Switzerland	4:00.7	
5	2	Abraham	Venezuela	4:36.4	
	2	Luc Baeyens	Belgium	DNF	
1	3	John Winch	Great Britain	3:50.7	Q
2	3	Herbert Stichnote	West Germany	3:51.5	Q
3	3	Henk Heida	Netherlands	3:52.0	Q
4	3	László Wittine	Hungary	3:53.8	
5	3	Giorgio Porro	Italy	3:54.3	
6	3	Hans Johansson	Sweden	4:01.0	
	3	Jean-Marie Argelès	France	DQ	

=== Final ===
Rank	Name	Nationality	Time	Notes
1st place, gold medalist(s)	Béla Szekeres	Hungary	3:50.9	
2nd place, silver medalist(s)	John Winch	Great Britain	3:52.0	
3rd place, bronze medalist(s)	Kuniaki Watanabe	Japan	3:52.1	
4	Stephen James	Great Britain	3:52.1	
5	Marek Jerzy	Poland	3:54.0	
6	Herbert Stichnote	West Germany	3:56.0	
7	Sergio Tomatio	Italy	3:57.0	
8	Bolesław Kowalczyk	Poland	3:59.5	
9	Henk Heida	Netherlands	DNF	
