= Oleg Ryakhovskiy =

Soviet triple jumper (1933–2023)

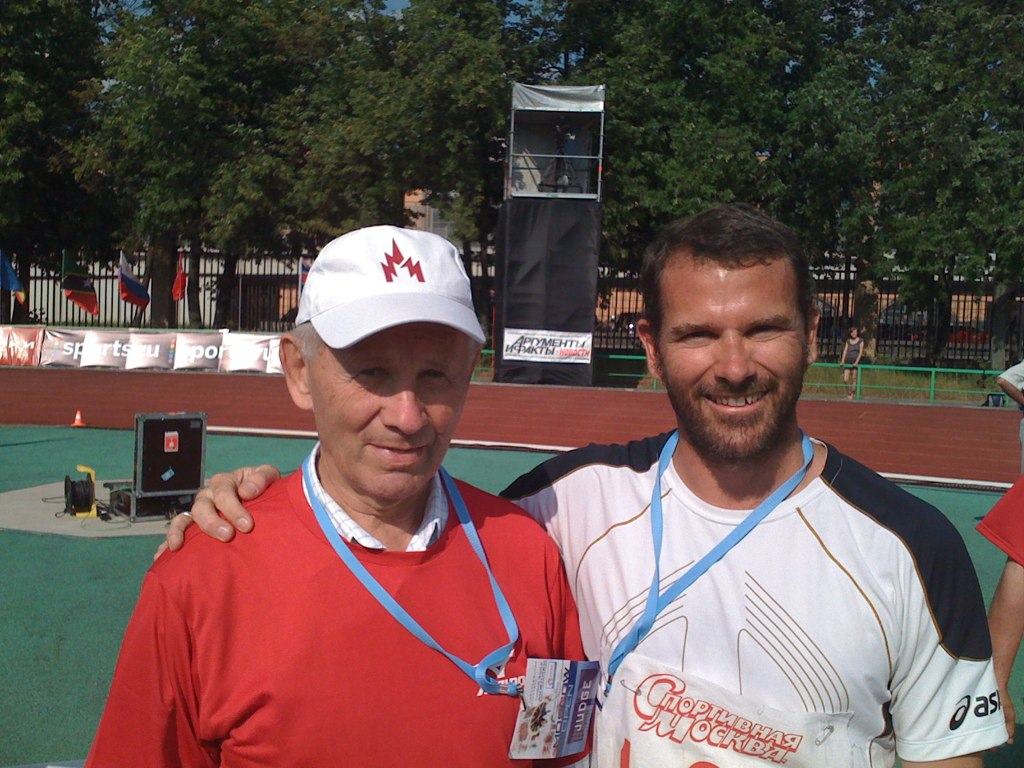
- Oleg Ryakhovskiy (left) at the 2009 Moscow Open

Personal information
- Born: 19 October 1933 Tashkent, Uzbek Soviet Socialist Republic
- Died: 16 December 2023 (aged 90) Moscow, Russia

Sport
- Sport: Track and field
- Event: Triple jump
Medal record
Representing Soviet Union
European Championships
Silver medal – second place	1958 Stockholm	Triple jump
Summer Universiade
Gold medal – first place	1959 Turin	Triple jump
Silver medal – second place	1961 Sofia	Triple jump

Oleg Anatolevitch Ryakhovskiy (Russian: Олег Анатольевич Ряховский; 19 October 1933 – 16 December 2023) was a Soviet and Russian triple jumper. He was a world record holder, the 1958 silver medallist at the European Athletics Championships, and twice Soviet national champion.

Born in Tashkent, Uzbek Soviet Socialist Republic, Ryakhovskiy began to reach elite level in the 1955 track and field season, clearing a best of 15.40 m (50 ft 6 1/4 in), which ranked him within the world's top 20 jumpers that season. He rose to seventh in the world rankings in 1957 with 15.93 m (52 ft 3 in), then gave the best performance of the season in 1958, at 16.29 m (53 ft 5 1/4 in). The latter mark was achieved at the Soviet Athletics Championships, where he put an end to Leonid Shcherbakov long-running streak to win his first national title.

The peak of Ryakhovskiy's career came in 1958. That year he achieved a triple jump world record of 16.59 m (54 ft 5 in) at the 1958 USA-USSR International Match, improving upon Brazilian Adhemar da Silva's three-year-old record by three centimetres. Ryakhovskiy's record stood for less than a year, as it was improved by fellow Soviet Oleg Fedoseyev the following May. Ryakhovskiy was selected for the Soviet team for the 1958 European Athletics Championships. Despite clearing sixteen metres at the competition (which no athlete had done previously) he was outperformed by Poland's Józef Szmidt and settled for European silver. He closed the season with a second straight national title at the Soviet Championships.

Ryakhovskiy had an unusual technique for the time, which relied less on lift in the jump stage and more on raw speed (he had a best of 10.6 seconds for the 100 metres). He remained high in the world rankings in the 1959, ranking fifth after clearing 16.38 m (53 ft 8 3/4 in) – the second best mark of his career, though this left him in second place behind Fedoseyev at the Spartakiade. A leg injury hampered his 1960 season; he was third nationally and dropped out of the global top ten performers. He ranked fifth in the world in 1961, but ceased to compete at a high level thereafter. He lost his state sports scholarship and instead opted for a purely academic one.

Ryakhovskiy was highly successful as a student-athlete during the period from 1957 to 1961. He won a gold medal at the 1957 World University Games in a games record 16.01 m (52 ft 6 1/4 in) – as the last winner of the competition, this record stands permanently. He followed this with two gold medals in 1959, winning at the World Festival of Youth and Students and then defeating Japanese Koji Sakurai and Hiroshi Shibata to claim the first ever men's triple jump title at the Universiade. He attempted to defend his Universiade title two years later, but was narrowly beaten by Romania's Sorin Ioan.

Ryakhovskiy studied sports science up to doctorate level at Moscow State Technical University and later became a professor there. Studying the mechanics of athletics, he served on the Technical Committee for the International Association of Athletics Federations for twelve years. Among his recommendations for the sport is a new method of recording false starts in sprint races. Ryakhovskiy argued that the current approach (measurement of pressure upon the starting blocks) unfairly impedes athletes who are stronger, heavier, or favour a starting technique with more backwards leg pressure. He has suggested using a light beam to measure movement of athlete's hands from the starting line, which is the first body part to move and can be measured equally across all athletes.

Ryakhovskiy died on 16 December 2023, at the age of 90.

== International competitions ==
Representing the Soviet Union
Year	Competition	Venue	Position	Event	Notes
1957	World University Games	Paris, France	1st	Triple jump	16.01 m
1958	European Championships	Stockholm, Sweden	2nd	Triple jump	16.02 m
1959	World Festival of Youth and Students	Vienna, Austria	1st	Triple jump	15.21 m
1959	Universiade	Turin, Italy	1st	Triple jump	15.74 m
1961	Universiade	Sofia, Bulgaria	2nd	Triple jump	15.85 m

== National titles ==
- Soviet Athletics Championships
  - Triple jump: 1958, 1959

== See also ==
- List of European Athletics Championships medalists (men)

Records
Preceded by Adhemar da Silva	Men's triple jump world record holder 28 July 1958 – 3 May 1959	Succeeded by Oleg Fedoseyev
