= Jean Clausse =

French athlete (1936–2020)

- Born: 4 September 1936; Nancy, France
- Died: 17 February 2020 (aged 83)
- Occupation: Runner

Jean Clausse (4 September 1936 – 17 February 2020) was a French athlete, who competed in middle-distance running.

== Biography ==
Clausse won two titles in the French Athletics Championships 1500 meter race, in 1961 and 1962, while representing the city of Nancy. He won the silver medal in the 1500 meters at the 1959 Mediterranean Games in Beirut. He won the 4x1500 meter relay at the 1962 European Athletics Championships in Belgrade with Robert Bogey, Michel Jazy, and Michel Bernard.

Clausse died on 17 February 2020 at the age of 83.
