= Thérèse Sclafert =

French geographer and historian

- Born: 18 May 1876; La Bachellerie, France
- Died: 25 April 1959 (aged 82); Fontenay-aux-Roses, France
- Other name: Jeanne-Thérèse Sclafert
- Education: University of Grenoble (B.A.); University of Paris (pH.D.)
- Occupations: Geographer and historian
- Years active: Research in the High Alpes

Thérèse Sclafert, possibly born Jeanne Sclafert (18 May 1876 – 25 April 1959) was a French historian and geographer.

== Biography ==
According to an obituary published in the Bulletin de la Société d'études des Hautes-Alpes in 1962, Thérèse Sclafert was born on 18 May 1876 La Bachellerie, in the Dordogne. However, no trace of her birth appears in the municipality's registry of civil status on this date. In the Official Journal, and in the population census of the city of Paris of 1936, she appears under the name of Jeanne Sclafert (or Jeanne-Thérèse Sclafert).

=== Career ===
Thérèse Sclafert became a school teacher in Bordeaux where she met Anne-Marie Grauvogel, who was headmistress of the Bordeaux upper primary school there. When Grauvogel was transferred to Grenoble, in Isère, before 1914, Sclafert joined her there and was named director of the Associated School of Application. Sclafert earned a Bachelor of Arts at the University of Grenoble and one of her professors was Raoul Blanchard, a geographer, who prepared her for the license before 1914. She also carried out research in the archives of Isère, specializing in historical geography (some of it written in Low Latin), so she could combine two of her passions: philology and geography.

In 1919 (or in 1917), Anne-Marie Grauvogel moved to Paris to take over the management of the École Normale Supérieure in Fontenay-aux-Roses. Sclafert also moved and became a grammar and Latin tutor at the same school. She also enrolled in a doctorate in history at the University of Paris, under the direction of the medievalist historian Ferdinand Lot (1866-1952). She defended her doctoral thesis in letters, Le Haut Dauphiné au Moyen Age, in 1926, in Paris, after 15 years of research, and obtained the very honorable mention. In the introduction to her thesis, she thanks in particular "masters and friends who have enlightened us with their knowledge and supported us with their sympathy," Among them were several notable historians and geographers: Paul Fournier, professor at the Faculty of Law of Paris, Raoul Blanchard, professor at the University of Grenoble, Robert Caillemer, professor at the Faculty of Law of Paris, Lucien Gallois, professor at the University of Paris, pupil and successor of Paul Vidal de La Blache, Ferdinand Lot, professor at the faculty of letters of Paris, Georges de Manteyer, archivist of Hautes-Alpes and French historian, Mr. Letonnelier, archivist of Isère, and Paul Thomé de Maisonneuve, voluntary archivist of Briançon. In addition, the historian Marc Bloch wrote a favorable account of her thesis in his review published in the Annales in 1930.

=== Post-doctorate work ===
Despite the publication of her thesis (which she dedicated to her parents) in 1926, Sclafert continued her job as a grammar and Latin teacher at the École Normale Supérieure in Fontenay. According to historian Natalie Zemon Davis in 2017, obtaining a thesis would ordinarily have been a step towards a promotion for a man with similar qualifications. However, Sclafert continued her work independently and published a few research articles.

Professional female historians were still rare at that time. She and Lucie Varga are the only two women to have each published an article (Sclafert's was "The roads of Dauphiné and Provence under the influence of the stay of the popes in Avignon") in the Revue des Annales between 1929 and 1944. She is also one of the few to have received academic recognition before 1945. However, it seems that the fact that Sclafert was a woman prevented her from truly professionalizing herself as an academic geographer.

In 1935, Anne-Marie Grauvogel was dismissed from the Fontenay-aux-Roses school, at which time Sclafert took early retirement, left Paris and settled in Manosque, where she continued her research on the southern Alps. Her work became slowed by a detached retina which made reading difficult. Still, she persisted as much as her eyesight allowed.

=== Death ===
Sclafert died on 25 April 1959, aged 82, in Fontenay-aux-Roses, in the department of Hauts-de-Seine. At that time she was completing work on her second major book, Cultures en Haute-Provence, which was published in 1959.

== Honors ==
Sclafert was elected to the Société d'études des Hautes-Alpes on 26 November 1938.

== Selected publications ==
=== Theses ===
The thesis defense for Thérèse Sclafert's doctorate in letters took place in 1926 in Paris. In a reading report that he makes during his edition, Lucien Gallois indicates that it “belongs to geography as much as to history.”

- The Haut Dauphiné in the Middle Ages, Paris, Société anonyme du Recueil Sirey, 1926, XIX-765 pages (main thesis).
- The Iron Industry in the Allevard Region in the Middle Ages, Grenoble, Impr. Allier father and son, 1926, 120 pages.

=== Books ===
- Cultures in Haute Provence. Deforestation and pastures in the Middle Ages, Paris, SEVPEN (publications of the Historical Research Center of the Practical School of Advanced Studies ), 1959 (posthumous book).
- As co-author with Jean-Gérard Lapacherie (scientific editor), Le Queyras in the Middle Ages, Transhumances editions, 2015.

=== Most recent articles ===
Sclafert published numerous articles in journals such as the Revue de Géographie Alpine, the Annales. Histoire, Sciences Sociale, the Annales de Géographie.

- “Agrarian uses in the regions of Provence before the 18th century. Les Rotations," Journal of Alpine Geography, 1941, vol. 29, no. 3, p. 471-492.
- "Polished stone axes and their accumulation sites in the south-east of France," Annales de Géographie, 1946, vol. 55, no. 298, pp. 130–131.
- “The Monts de Vaucluse. Exploitation of the woods from the 13th to the end of the 18th century," Revue de Géographie Alpine, 1951, vol. 39, no. 4, p. 673-707.
