= Nereo Svara =

Italian hurler (1935–2024)

Personal information
- Nationality: Italian
- Born: 20 September 1935 Trieste, Italy
- Died: 9 September 2024 (aged 88) Trieste, Italy
- Height: 1.88 m (6 ft 2 in)
- Weight: 87 kg (192 lb)

Sport
- Country: Italy
- Sport: Athletics
- Event: 110 metres hurdles
Medal record
Representing Italy
Summer Universiade
Silver medal – second place	1959 Turin	110m hurdles

Nereo Emilio Luigi Svara (20 September 1935 – 9 September 2024) was an Italian hurdler who competed at the 1960 Summer Olympics. Svara died in Trieste on 23 September 2024, at the age of 89.

Svara won the British AAA Championships title in the 120 yards hurdles event at the 1961 AAA Championships.
