= Guy Lagorce =

French journalist and athlete (1937–2023)

Personal information
- Born: 12 January 1937 La Bachellerie, France
- Died: 13 July 2023 (aged 86)

Sport
- Sport: Track and field
Medal record
Representing France
Summer Universiade
Bronze medal – third place	1959 Turin	4x100m relay

Guy Lagorce (12 January 1937 – 13 July 2023) was a French journalist and writer, and winner of the 1984 Prix des libraires.

== Biography ==
Guy Lagorce was born in La Bachellerie (Dordogne). Lagorce became a sprint international athlete (100m, 200m and member of the French team). He improved the national record of the 4 × 100 m in 1961 at Thonon with Paul Genevay, Claude Piquemal and Jocelyn Delecour in 39.9 and that of Europe in the 4 × 200 m also in 1961 with the same compatriot sprinters. He has 13 team selections from France.

Lagorce then became a sports journalist and chief editor at L'Équipe, TF1, Le Figaro, Paris Match and L'Express.

In addition, as a writer, several films and television films have been made on television and in films from his books, in particular by Jacques Ertaud and Yves Boisset.

Guy Lagorce died on 13 July 2023, at the age of 86.

== Work ==
- 1972: La Fabuleuse Histoire des Jeux Olympiques, cowritten with Robert Parienté, Minerva. ISBN 978-2-8307-0583-6 — Prix de l'Académie des Sports
- 1975: Noblesse du sport, cowritten with Robert Parienté, illustrations by André Dunoyer de Segonzac and André Planson
- 1976: Ne pleure pas, Éditions Grasset, ISBN 2246003008 — Prix Maison de la Presse
- 1977: La Vitesse du vent, Éditions Julliard, ISBN 2260000835
- 1979: Marie en plein soleil, France Loisir, ISBN 2724206711
- 1980: La Raison des fous, Grasset, ISBN 2246250900
- 1980: Les Héroïques, Éditions Gallimard, ISBN 2710308460 — Prix Goncourt de la nouvelle and prix Cazes
- 1981: Les Carnassiers, Grasset, ISBN 2246249619
- 1983: Le Train du soir, Grasset, ISBN 2246304512 — Prix des libraires
- 1985: Rue des Victoires, Grasset, ISBN 2246352517
- 1988: Fin de soirée, Grasset, ISBN 2246381118
- 1992: Les Dieux provisoires, JC Lattès, ISBN 2709611147
- 1994: Du vent sous la peau, JC Lattès, ISBN 2709613700
- 1995: Peinture fraîche, JC Lattès, ISBN 2709616009
- 1997: La Fine Équipe, JC Lattè, ISBN 978-2709617543
- 1999: Quelqu'un de bien, Plon, ISBN 2259187382
