= Béla Szekeres (runner) =

Hungarian middle-distance runner (1938–2000)

Personal information
- Born: 11 January 1938 Hajdúböszörmény, Hungary
- Died: 24 February 2000 (aged 62) Budapest, Hungary

Sport
- Sport: Track and field
Medal record
Representing Hungary
Summer Universiade
Gold medal – first place	1959 Turin	1500m
Silver medal – second place	1963 Porto Alegre	5000m

Béla Szekeres (11 January 1938 – 24 February 2000) was a Hungarian middle distance runner who competed in the 1960 Summer Olympics.
