= La Bachellerie =

- Commune
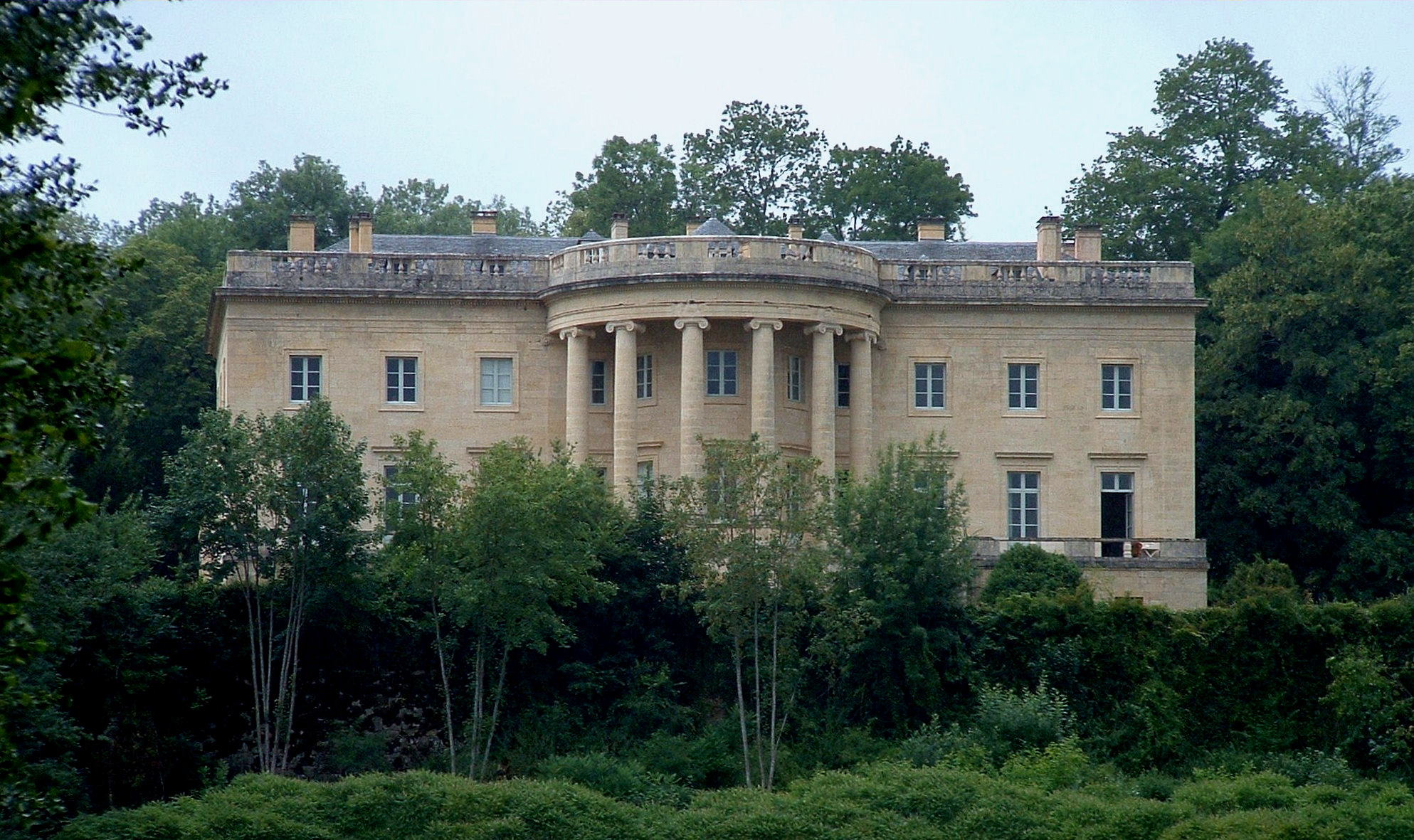
- Chateau of Rastignac
- Location of La Bachellerie
- Location within France Location within Nouvelle-Aquitaine
- Coordinates: 45°08′48″N 1°09′15″E
- Country: France
- Region: Nouvelle-Aquitaine
- Department: Dordogne
- Arrondissement: Sarlat-la-Canéda
- Canton: Haut-Périgord Noir

Government
  - Mayor (2020–2026): Roland Moulinier
- Area^{1}: 17.34 km^{2} (6.70 sq mi)
- Elevation: 121 m (397 ft)
- Highest elevation: 281 m (922 ft)
- Lowest elevation: 94 m (308 ft)
- Population (2023): 891
  - Density: 51.4/km^{2} (133/sq mi)
- Time zone: UTC+01:00 (CET)
  - Summer (DST): UTC+02:00 (CEST)
- INSEE/Postal code: 24020 /24210
- Website: http://www.labachellerie-perigord.fr/
- ^{1} French Land Register data, which excludes lakes, ponds, glaciers > 1 km^{2} (0.386 sq mi or 247 acres) and river estuaries.

La Bachellerie (French pronunciation: [la baʃɛlʁi]; Occitan: La Bachalariá) is a commune in the Dordogne department in southwestern France.

== Geography ==
=== Location ===
La Bachellerie is a rural commune (town) situated in Périgord Noir in the east of the Dordogne department (county).

The town of La Bachellerie is situated nine kilometres north of Montignac-Lascaux, and twelve kilometres west of Terrasson-Lavilledieu.

=== Geology and relief ===
==== Geology ====
Situated on the north plate of the Aquitaine basin and bordered at its north-eastern point by the edge of the Central massif, the Dordogne department presents great geological diversity. The land is arranged in depth, in regular strata, evidence of sedimentation on this ancient marine plate. The department could therefore be divided in the geological plan in four tiers, differentiated according to their geological age. La Bachellerie is situated in the second tier from the north-east, a plateau formed of very strong limestone from the Jurassic period, that the sea deposited by carbonate chemical sedimentation, in large, thick banks.

The level strata on the commune's land are made up of Quaternary surface-level formations, of sedimentary rocks dating back to the Cenozoic era and others from the Mesozoic and Paleozoic eras. The oldest formation, noted tfρ3, is made of Thiviers sandstone and Allassac slate, chlorite-bearing rhyodacitic metatuffs and metagreywackes and intercalated sericite schists (middle to upper Cambrian). The most recent formation, noted CFvs, is part of the surface-level formations of the dry valley carbonate colluvium type: silty sand with calcareous debris and sandy clay with debris. The description of these strata is detailed in the file " no 784 - Terrasson " from the geological map 1/50 000 of metropolitan France and its associated notice.

==== Relief and landscape ====
The Dordogne department appears as an immense plateau sloped from the north-east to the south-west. The altitude of the commune's territory varies from 94m at the far east of the commune, to 281m in an area east of a place called Combalou.

In the framework of the European Landscape Convention, brought into law in France on 1 July 2006, reinforced by the law on 8 August 2016 for the reclamation of biodiversity, nature and the countryside, the atlas of the landscape of Dordogne was developed under State project jurisdiction, and was published in October 2020. The landscape of the department are organised into eight landscape units and 14 sub-units. The commune is part of Central Périgord, a hilly terrain, with horisons limited by numerous relatively dense wooded areas, dotted with meadows and small fields.

The cadastral zone of the commune published by Insee, which serves as a reference for all the statistics, is 17.34km2. The geographic area, issues from the BD Topo, component of the Référentiel à grande échelle (Large scale reference system) produced by IGN, is respectively 17.73km2.

=== Hydrography ===
==== Hydrographic network ====
The commune is situated in the Dordogne basin within the Adour-Garonne Basin. It is drained by the Cern, the Taravellou, the Nuelle, the Pouchard and by various small streams, which make up a hydrographic network with a 16 km total length.

The Cern (also called Douime in its uppstream part), of a total length of 13.64 km, has its source in the Azerat commune and joins with the Vézère at the riverbank to the right of Lardin-Saint-Lazare, opposite the commune of Condat-sur-Vézère. It waters the north of the western commune for over five and a half kilometres.

The Taravellou, with a total length of 10.51 km, has its source in the commune of Badefols-d'Ans and joins with the Cern – of which it is the main tributary – on the left riverbank, in the borth of the comunal territory It waters the commnal territy for more that a kilometre and a half, of which 700 metres are within the limit of Saint-Rabier.

Two other tributaries of the left riverbank of the Cern flow through the commune: the Pouchard for nearly 800 metres in the north and the Nuelle for 15 metres in the east.

== Population ==
Historical population
Year	Pop.	±% p.a.
1968	733	—
1975	668	−1.32%
1982	711	+0.90%
1990	722	+0.19%
1999	664	−0.93%
2007	853	+3.18%
2012	919	+1.50%
2017	899	−0.44%
2023	891	−0.15%
Source: INSEE

== Notable people ==
- The French sprinter, journalist and writer Guy Lagorce was born in La Bachellerie in 1937.
- Geographer and historian Thérèse Sclafert was born in La Bachellerie in 1876.

== See also ==
- Communes of the Dordogne department
