= Raoul Blanchard =

French geographer (1877–1965)

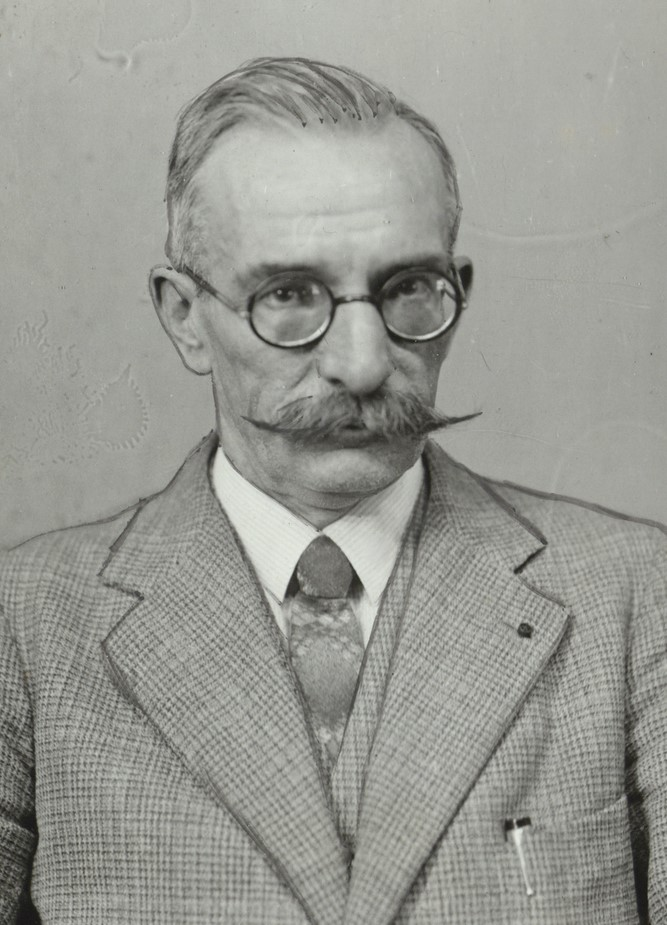
- Born: 4 September 1877; Orléans, France
- Died: 24 March 1965 (aged 87); Paris, France
- Occupation: Geographer
- Known for: Father of modern geography in Québec
- Honours: National Order of the Legion of Honor, CNRS gold medal, Broquette-Gonin prize, Charles P. Daly medal, Honorary doctorate from Laval University

Raoul Blanchard (4 September 1877 – 24 March 1965) was a French geographer. He taught at the University of Grenoble from 1906 and devoted most of his research to Alpine and Canadian geography.

== Early life ==
The son of an inspector of the Department of Water of Orléans, Blanchard attended Holy Cross School and Pothier Secondary School, where he studied under the geographer Louis Gallouédec. He was admitted to the Ecole Normale Superieure in 1897, he became excited by geography, which was taught by Paul Vidal de La Blache.

Blanchard received his agrégation in 1900 and became a professor at the school of Douai, France. He prepared a thesis on the regional geography of Flanders, which he defended in 1906 under the title Flanders, Geographic Study of the Flemish Plain in France, Belgium, Holland.

== Grenoble ==
A few months after his successful defence, he was appointed to the Faculty of Arts of the University of Grenoble. In 1907, he founded a research centre on the French Alps of which very little was then known. The Alpine Geography Institute was endowed in 1913, and its journal began in 1920 and became the Revue de géographie alpine (Alpine Geography Review). Blanchard collaborated with the institute and its journal for 50 years, and both still exist today.

He was appointed professor in 1913 and became known as the head of geography at the University of Grenoble. One of his students there was geographer Thérèse Sclafert. His 12 volumes on the French Alps are considered his chief work. He taught at the University of Grenoble until his retirement, in 1948.

== North America ==
Blanchard was appointed an instructor at Harvard University, in Massachusetts, in 1917 and was named a full professor from 1928 to 1936, which gave him the opportunity to spend a few months a year in North America. In 1929, he grew interested in the geography of French-speaking Canada. Given the Francophone roots in the Canadian province of Quebec and the facilities available there, Blanchard enjoyed researching the vast area, which had not been the subject of geographical study. Until 1960, he visited Quebec 15 times. He began to produce documents about Quebec with a strictly-geographical method.

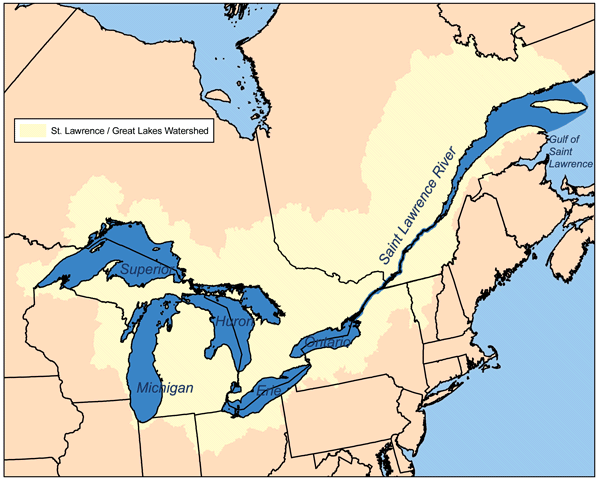
Map of the Saint Lawrence/Great Lakes Watershed and the Gaspé Peninsula.

During his five autumn trips (1929 to 1933), he travelled to the Gaspé Peninsula twice on foot and by car. He also went to the north shore of the st. Lawrence River and the Natashquan River. As a man accustomed to Europe, he was very interested in the novelty of Quebec culture. In 1930, he published Gaspé Peninsula in his journal, the first in a long series of articles about Canada, especially Quebec.

Blanchard then became a part-time lecturer in Montreal. In 1947, he agreed to found an Institute of Geography of the University of Montreal, which in 1962 became the Department of Geography. The institute offered courses that took place in Gaspé, New Brunswick, and Nova Scotia according to the method that had been used in his 1929 study. Blanchard was appointed the first director of the institute until illness struck, when one of his students, Pierre Dagenais, took over.

At the 1939 founding of the Geographical Society of Montreal, Blanchard was appointed honorary president, and in 1952, he became president of the Association of Geographers.

In 1958, he was elected to the Académie des sciences morales et politiques (Academy of Moral and Political Sciences).

In 1964, a year before his death, his last book was published at Porte de Paris, in Quebec City.

The great Quebec economic historian Albert Faucher praised Blanchard's work in Quebec by writing in 1962:

He never claimed to be an economist historian and yet, in his investigations, he never neglected the temporal dimension of the spatial phenomena he studied. His works abound in historical insights. The historian will be able to criticize it, he will never finish consulting it or quoting it. Perhaps we will say of him what Talleyrand said of Jeremy Bentham: no matter how much they plunder him, he remains rich.

== Death and legacy ==
Blanchard died on 24 March 1965 in Paris.

He is considered the father of modern geography in Quebec. To thank him for his many contributions, the Commission de Toponymie du Québec gave his name to a mountain near Quebec City reaching 1,181 m above sea level, the highest peak in the Laurentian Mountains. In addition, the geography department of the University of Montreal honoured him by naming its largest classroom after him.

As of 2020, he is the only geographer to have received the CNRS gold medal (1960).

In 1966, the Association des Amis de l'Université de Grenoble published Raoul Blanchard (1877-1965): in memoriam, which contains a biography.

In the centre of Grenoble is rue Raoul-Blanchard.

Collège Raoul-Blanchard is in Annecy.

A spatial analysis laboratory named after him is in Nice.

Since June 5, 1954, a street is named after him in Koksijde.

== Selected bibliography ==
He wrote about 290 works covering a wide range of subjects such as Flanders, the French Alps, the Middle East and North America (especially Quebec).

- La Flandre. Étude de géographie de la plaine flamande, en France, Belgique et Hollande, Armand Colin, Paris, 1906
- « L’Habitation en Queyras », La Géographie, 1909
- « Sur quelques géants américains », Journal de la Société des Américanistes de Paris, Paris, 1909.
- Grenoble, étude de géographie urbaine, Armand Colin, Paris, 1911
- Rapport général de l'exposition internationale de la houille blanche, Grands établissements de l'imprimerie générale, Grenoble, 1925
- Les Alpes françaises, Armand Colin, Paris, 1925
- « Asie occidentale », Géographie universelle, Paris, 1929
- « La presqu'île de Gaspé », Revue de Géographie Alpine, Grenoble, 1930
- « Les Problèmes du Canada français », Académie des sciences morales et politiques, Paris, 1932
- « L'Amérique du Nord : États-Unis, Canada et Alaska », Fayard, Paris, 1933
- « Géographie de l'industrie », 1934
- L'Est du Canada français, Province de Québec, 2 vol., Montréal, 1935
- A geography of Europe, together with Raymond E. Christ, Henry Holt, New York, 1935
- Grenoble, étude de géographie urbaine, 3rd edition, Librairie Didier & Richard, Grenoble, 1935.
- « Géographie de Québec », Bulletin de la Société de Statistique, Grenoble, 1935.
- Les Alpes occidentales, 1937; 1958
- Géographie générale, 1938
- Le Centre du Canada français, 1947
- Montréal: esquisse de géographie urbaine, 1947.
- Le Québec par l'image, 1949
- La Mauricie, 1950
- Les Alpes et leur destin, Fayard, Paris, 1953
- L'Ouest du Canada français, 5 vol., Montréal, 1953-1954.
- Réflexions sur les hautes vallées alpestres, Grenoble, 1958
- Le Canada français, 1960-1964
- Le Canada français, 3rd edition, Presses universitaires de France, Paris, 1970
