= Juhani Orrenmaa =

Finnish schoolteacher and politician (1939–2023)

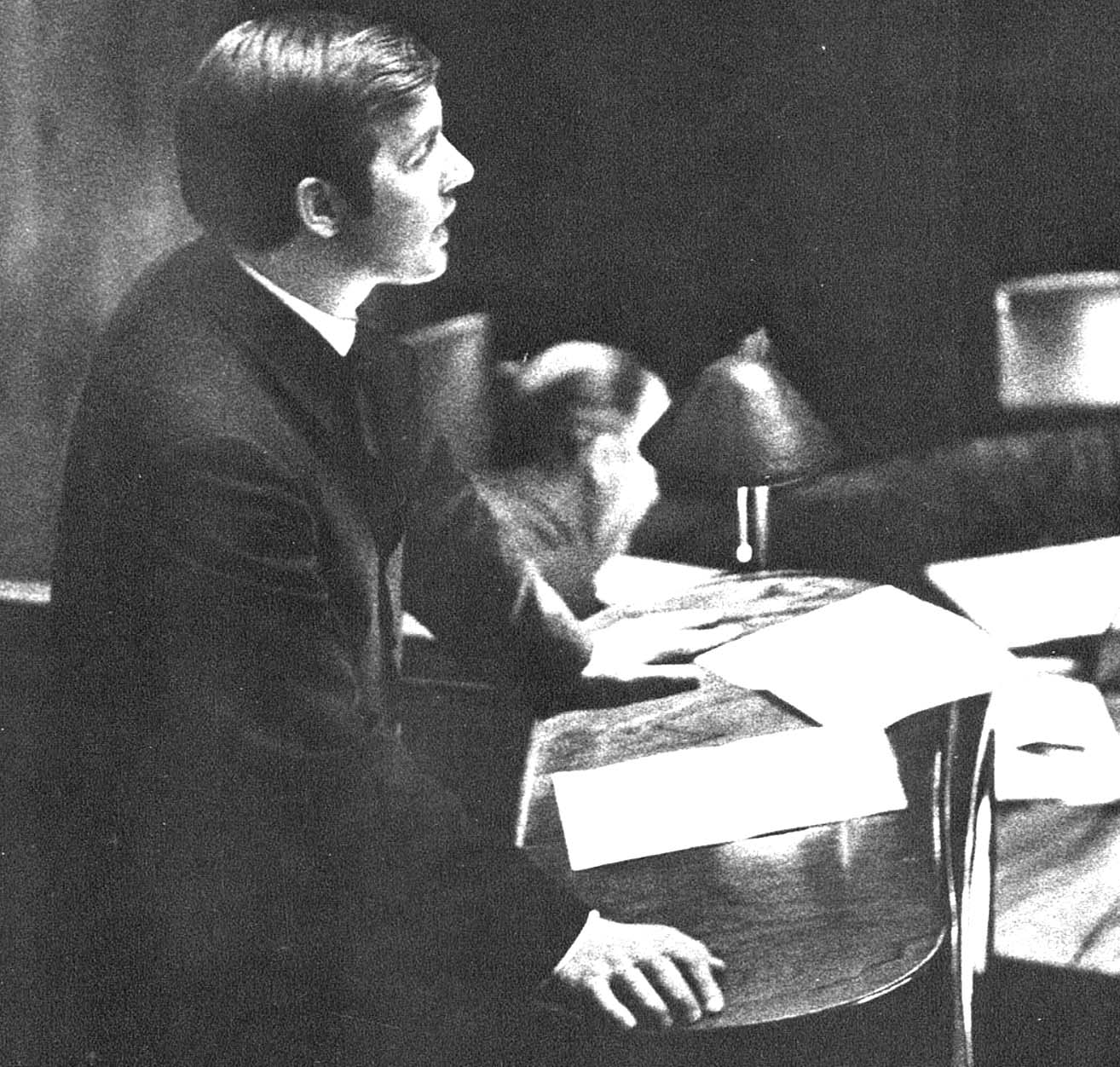
- Orrenmaa in 1970

Member of the Parliament of Finland for Vaasa
- In office 23 March 1970 – 21 January 1972
- In office 27 September 1975 – 23 March 1979

Personal details
- Born: Heikki Juhani Orrenmaa; 27 July 1939 Kauhava, Finland
- Died: 5 August 2023 (aged 84) Seinäjoki, Finland
- Party: LK
- Occupation: Schoolteacher

Heikki Juhani Orrenmaa (27 July 1939 – 5 August 2023) was a Finnish schoolteacher and politician. A member of the Liberal People's Party, he served in Parliament from 1970 to 1972 and again from 1975 to 1979.

Orrenmaa also competed in athletics at the 1959 World University Games, qualifying for the semifinals and running a best time of 15.3 seconds for 110 metres hurdles to place 14th overall.

Orrenmaa died in Seinäjoki on 5 August 2023 at the age of 84.
