= Paul Genevay =

French sprinter (1939–2022)

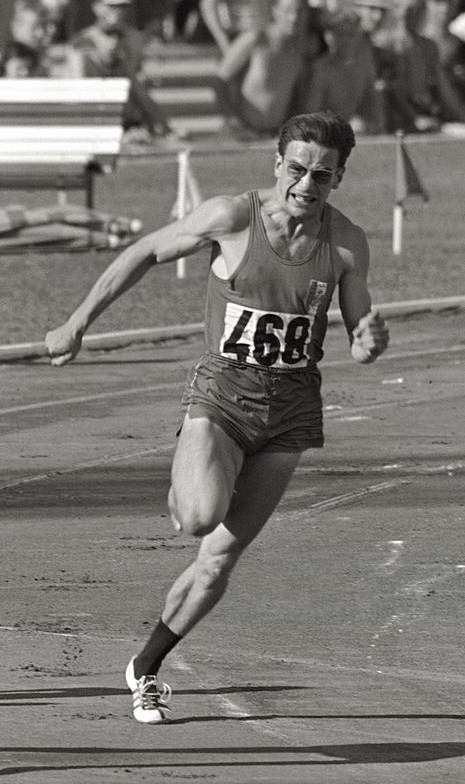
- Genevay at the 1960 Olympics

Personal information
- Born: 21 January 1939 La Côte-Saint-André, Isère, France
- Died: 11 March 2022 (aged 83) France
- Height: 174 cm (5 ft 9 in)
- Weight: 74 kg (163 lb)

Sport
- Sport: Athletics
- Event: Sprint
- Club: Grenoble Union Club; Lyon OU

Achievements and titles
- Personal bests: 100 m – 10.3 (1966); 200 m – 20.9 (1959)
Medal record
Representing France
Olympic Games
Bronze medal – third place	1964 Tokyo	4×100 m
Mediterranean Games
Gold medal – first place	1959 Beirut	200 m
Gold medal – first place	1959 Beirut	4×100 m
Silver medal – second place	1959 Beirut	100 m
Silver medal – second place	1959 Beirut	4×400 m
Silver medal – second place	1963 Naples	4×100 m

Paul Louis Marcel Genevay (21 January 1939 – 11 March 2022) was a French sprinter. He competed in the 200 m and 4 × 100 m events at the 1960 and 1964 Olympics and won a bronze medal in the relay in 1964. He failed to reach the final in three other competitions. Genevay won two gold and one silver medals in the sprint at the 1959 Mediterranean Games. He died on 11 March 2022, at the age of 83.
