= Léon Syrovatski =

French javelin thrower

Personal information
- Born: 28 July 1938 (age 88) Paris, France
- Height: 184 cm (6 ft 0 in)
- Weight: 70 kg (154 lb)

Sport
- Country: France
- Sport: Athletics (track and field)
- Event: Javelin throw

Léon Syrovatski (born 28 July 1938) is a former javelin thrower from France, who finished in 18th place in two consecutive Summer Olympics: 1956 and 1960. He set his personal best (76.68 metres) in 1963. He was born in Paris.

== Achievements ==
Year	Competition	Venue	Position	Notes
1956	Olympic Games	Melbourne, Australia	18th	64.58 m
1959	Mediterranean Games	Beirut, Lebanon	1st	74.10 m
1960	Olympic Games	Rome, Italy	18th	71.59 m
