= Peter Schöttler =

German historian

Peter Schöttler (born 15 January 1950 in Iserlohn) is a German historian working in France and Germany. He was a research director at the Centre national de la recherche scientifique in Paris and teaches now at the Freie Universität Berlin, where he has held an honorary professorship since 2001.

Schöttler was born in North Rhine-Westphalia, but grew up in Brussels, thus becoming bilingual. He studied at Ruhr-Universität Bochum, close to his birthplace, and then in Paris at the École Pratique des Hautes Études. In history he was a student of Hans Mommsen in Bochum and Michelle Perrot in Paris; he studied philosophy under Louis Althusser. He has been an interpreter and translator of the work of major 20th-century historians, notably Marc Bloch and Lucien Febvre, co-founders of the journal Annales and the associated Annales School. He has also translated Fernand Braudel and has explored and popularized the work of Lucie Varga, the first woman member of the Annales group of historians.

Schöttler has taught at different German and Austrian universities and at the École des hautes études en sciences sociales (EHESS). In 1990/91 he was a member at the Institute for Advanced Study and in 1996/97 a visiting fellow at Princeton University. Since 2008 he is a visiting scholar at the Max Planck Institute for the History of Science in Berlin.

At the 1998 Deutscher Historikertag Schöttler, Götz Aly and Michael Fahlbusch were involved in the debate concerning the role of German historians during the Third Reich. The trio suggested that Theodor Schieder, Werner Conze and Karl-Dietrich Erdmann were complicit with the Nazi regime rather than inwardly withdrawn intellectually through inner emigration.

Peter Schöttler is the grandson of the Waffen-SS brigade leader Gustav Krukenberg.

== Books ==
- Naissance des Bourses du travail. Un appareil idéologique d'État à la fin du XIXe siècle, Presses universitaires de France, coll. "Pratiques théoriques", Paris, 1985.
- (ed.) Gareth Stedman Jones, Klassen, Politik und Sprache. Für eine theorieorientierte Sozialgeschichte, Verlag Westfälisches Dampfboot, Munster, 1988.
- (ed.) Lucie Varga, Les Autorités invisibles. Une historienne autrichienne aux ‘Annales’, Le Cerf, coll. "Bibliothèque franco-allemande", Paris, 1991.
- (ed.) Lucien Febvre, Le Rhin. Mythes et histoire, Perrin, Paris, 1997
- (ed.) Lucien Febvre, Martin Luther , Campus Verlag/Éditions de la Maison des Sciences de l’Homme, Francfort/Paris, 1996.
- (ed.) Lucien Febvre, Margarete von Navarra. Eine Königin der Renaissance zwischen Macht, Liebe und Religion, Campus Verlag/Éditions de la Maison des Sciences de l'Homme, Frankfurt/Paris, 1998.
- (ed.) Geschichtsschreibung als Legitimationswissenschaft, 1918-1945, Suhrkamp Verlag, Francfort, 1997.
- (ed.) Marc Bloch - Historiker und Widerstandskämpfer, Campus Verlag/Éditions de la Maison des Sciences de l'Homme, Francfort/Paris, 1999.
- (ed.) Marc Bloch, Aus der Werkstatt des Historikers. Zur Theorie und Praxis der Geschichtswissenschaft, Campus Verlag/Éditions de la Maison des Sciences de l'Homme, Francfort/Paris, 2000.
- (ed.) Marc Bloch, Apologie der Geschichtswissenschaft oder Der Beruf des Historikers, Verlag Klett-Cotta, Stuttgart, 2002.
- (ed. with Philippe Despoix), Siegfried Kracauer, penseur de l’histoire, Éditions de la Maison des Sciences de l’Homme, Paris, 2006.
- (ed. with Hans-Jörg Rheinberger), Marc Bloch et le crises du savoir, Berlin, Max Planck Institute for the History of Science, 2011 (Preprint 418).
- (ed. with Henning Schmidgen et Jean-François Braunstein), Epistemology and History. From Bachelard and Canguilhem to Today’s History of Science, Berlin, Max Planck Institute for the History of Science, 2012 (Preprint 434)
- (ed. with Dieter Gosewinkel et Iris Schröder), Antiliberales Europa, numéro thématique de la revue Zeithistorische Forschungen, 9, 2012, no. 3.
- (ed.) Fernand Braudel, Geschichte als Schlüssel zur Welt. Vorlesungen in deutscher Kriegsgefangenschaft 1941, Verlag Klett-Cotta, Stuttgart, 2013.
- Die "Annales"-Historiker und die deutsche Geschichtswissenschaft, Tübingen, Verlag Mohr-Siebeck, 2015.
- Du Rhin à la Manche. Frontières et relations franco-allemandes au XXe siècle, Foreword by Henry Rousso, Tours, Presses Universitaires Francois-Rabelais, 2017.
- Das Max Planck Institut für Geschichte im historischen Kontext: Die Ära Heimpel. Berlin, Max Planck Institute for the History of Science, 2017 .
- Nach der Angst. Geschichtswissenschaft vor und nach dem „linguistic turn“. Münster, Verlag Westfälisches Dampfboot, 2018.
- Das Max-Planck-Institut für Geschichte im historischen Kontext 1972–2006. Zwischen Sozialgeschichte, Historischer Anthropologie und Historischer Kulturwissenschaft. Berlin, Max-Planck-Institute for the History of Science, 2020 .
