= Athletics at the 1959 Summer Universiade – Men's 5000 metres =

The men's 5000 metres event at the 1959 Summer Universiade was held at the Stadio Comunale di Torino in Turin with the final on 6 September 1959.

== Results ==
Rank	Name	Nationality	Time	Notes
1st place, gold medalist(s)	Kevin Gilligan	Great Britain	14:09.8	
2nd place, silver medalist(s)	Saburo Yokomizo	Japan	14:14.8	
3rd place, bronze medalist(s)	Jaroslav Bohatý-Pavelka	Czechoslovakia	14:18.0	
4	Nikolay Golubenkov	Soviet Union	14:23.6	
5	Marian Dobija	Poland	14:31.4	
6	Pål Benum	Norway	14:37.0	
7	Josef Sidler	Switzerland	14:56.6	
8	János Pintér	Hungary	14:56.6	
9	John Jackson	Great Britain	15:03.8	
10	Albin Czech	Poland	15:12.4	
11	Hans-Josef Güdelhöfer	West Germany	15:14.6	
12	Marino Riva	Italy	16:09.2	
