= Krešimir Račić =

Croatian hammer thrower

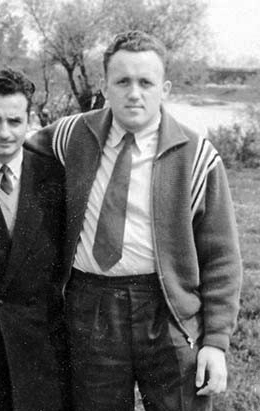

Personal information
- Born: 15 August 1932 Karlovac, Yugoslavia
- Died: 19 June 1994 (aged 61) Zagreb, Croatia
- Height: 185 cm (6 ft 1 in)
- Weight: 100 kg (220 lb)

Sport
- Sport: Athletics
- Event: Hammer throw
- Club: Partizan Beograd

Achievements and titles
- Personal best: 63.89 m (1960)
Medal record
Representing Yugoslavia
Mediterranean Games
Gold medal – first place	1959 Beirut	Hammer throw

Krešimir "Krešo" Račić (15 August 1932 – 19 June 1994) was a Croatian hammer thrower. He competed for Yugoslavia in the 1956 and 1960 Summer Olympics and placed sixth in 1956. He won a gold medal in the 1959 Mediterranean Games and a bronze in the 1959 Summer Universiade. During his career Račić had a strong domestic rivalry with Zvonko Bezjak, with Račić winning the Yugoslav title in 1954, 1955, 1957, 1959, 1961, 1962 and 1964 and Bezjak in 1956, 1958, 1960 and 1963.
