= Ali Brakchi =

French-Algerian long jumper (1934–2021)

Personal information
- Nickname: Alain
- Born: 26 February 1934 Sidi Aïch, French Algeria
- Died: 15 January 2021 (aged 86) Basse-Terre, Guadeloupe
Medal record
Men's Athletics
Representing France
Mediterranean Games
Gold medal – first place	1959 Beirut	Long jump
Gold medal – first place	1959 Beirut	4x100m relay
Summer Universiade
Bronze medal – third place	1959 Turin	Long jump
Bronze medal – third place	1959 Turin	4x100m relay

Ali "Alain" Brakchi (26 February 1934 – 15 January 2021) was a track and field athlete from France, who was born in Sidi Aïch, Algeria. He mainly competed in the men's long jump. He represented France at the 1960 Summer Olympics in Rome, Italy.

He won a gold medal in the long jump for Algeria at the 1963 GANEFO.
