= Nikolaos Georgopoulos =

Greek sprinter

Personal information
- Born: 31 January 1937 (age 89) Athens, Greece

Sport
- Sport: Track and field
Medal record
Representing Greece
Mediterranean Games
Gold medal – first place	1959 Beirut	4x400m relay
Summer Universiade
Silver medal – second place	1959 Turin	200m

Nikolaos Georgopoulos (born 31 January 1937 in Athens) is a Greek former sprinter who competed in the 1960 Summer Olympics.

He was part of Greece's winning 4×400 metres relay team at the 1959 Mediterranean Games. He also represented his country at the European Athletics Championships in 1954 and 1958, and was a 200 metres silver medallist at the 1959 Universiade.
