= Andreas Kouvelogiannis =

Greek hammer thrower

Personal information
- Nationality: Greek
- Born: 7 March 1939 (age 87) Athens, Greece

Sport
- Sport: Athletics
- Event: Hammer throw

Andreas Kouvelogiannis (born 7 March 1939) is a Greek athlete. He competed in the men's hammer throw at the 1960 Summer Olympics.
