= Konstantinos Moragiemos =

Greek former sprinter

Konstantinos Moragiemos (Greek: Κωνσταντίνος Μοραγιέμος; born 18 November 1936) is a Greek former sprinter who competed in the 1960 Summer Olympics.
