= Marc Rabémila =

Malagasy athlete

Personal information
- Nationality: Malagasy
- Born: 27 April 1938
- Died: 16 May 2008 (aged 70)

Sport
- Sport: Athletics
- Event: Triple jump

Marc Rabémila (27 April 1938 – 16 May 2008) was a Malagasy athlete. He competed in the men's triple jump at the 1964 Summer Olympics.

Rabémila is a former Malagasy record holder in the triple jump. He is married to former Malagasy professional tennis player Olga Rabemila.
