= Fahir Özgüden =

Turkish hurdler (1933–1979)

Fahir Özgüden (1933 – 8 August 1979) was a Turkish hurdler who competed in the 1960 Summer Olympics.
