= Maurice Fournier =

French high jumper (1933–2024)

Maurice Paul Victor Fournier (18 January 1933 – 28 June 2024) was a French high jumper who competed in the 1956 Summer Olympics and in the 1960 Summer Olympics.

Fournier was born in Lassigny on 18 January 1933. He died on 28 June 2024, at the age of 91.
