= Bakir Benaïssa =

Moroccan long-distance runner (born 1931)

Bakir Benaïssa (born 7 April 1931) is a Moroccan former long-distance runner who competed in the 1960 Summer Olympics in Rome, finishing 8th in the marathon in 2:21:21.4, and in the 1964 Summer Olympics in Tokyo. He won the 10,000 meters and finished second at the 5,000 meters at the Pan-Arab Games in Beirut in 1957, and won the quadrennial Mediterranean Games marathons in 1959 and 1963. He was born in Rabat. The 1960 Rome marathon resulted in a world record for winner, Ethiopia's Abebe Bikila, with Benaïssa's teammate, Rhadi Ben Abdesselam, finishing a close second.

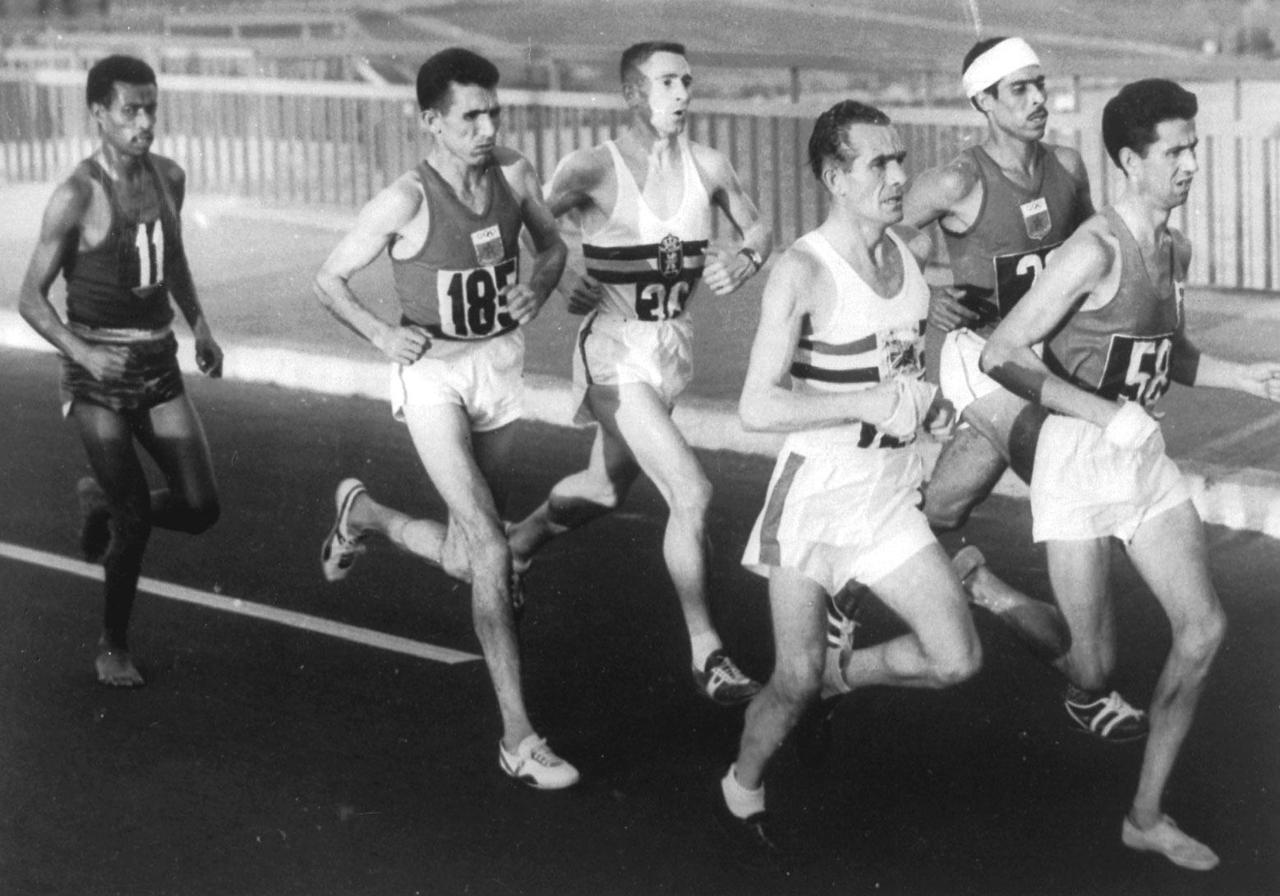
The 1960 Olympic marathon's lead pack, near the 10 km (6 mi) mark, Bikila (#11), following Bertie Messitt (#58), Benaïssa (wearing headband), Arthur Keily (#46), Aurèle Vandendriessche (#36), and ben Abdesselam (#185).
