= Éric Battista =

French triple jumper (born 1933)

Personal information
- Born: 14 May 1933 (age 93) Sète, France

Sport
- Sport: Track and field
Medal record
Representing France
Mediterranean Games
Gold medal – first place	1955 Barcelona	Triple jump
Gold medal – first place	1959 Beirut	Triple jump

Éric Battista (born 14 May 1933) is a French former triple jumper who competed in the 1956 Summer Olympics, in the 1960 Summer Olympics, and in the 1964 Summer Olympics.
