= Georgios Marsellos =

Greek hurdler (1936–2026)

Personal information
- Born: 12 October 1936 Athens, Greece
- Died: 4 August 2026 (aged 89) Athens, Greece

Sport
- Sport: Track and field
Medal record
Representing Greece
Mediterranean Games
Gold medal – first place	1959 Beirut	110m hurdles
Silver medal – second place	1959 Beirut	Decathlon

Georgios Marsellos (Greek: Γεώργιος Μάρσελλος; 12 October 1936 – 4 August 2026) was a Greek 110 m hurdler who competed in the 1960 Summer Olympics and in the 1964 Summer Olympics. For the 1964 Olympics he served as a torchbearer and was the flag bearer for Greece at the opening ceremony. Marsellos died on 4 August 2026, at the age of 89.
