= Bernardino Lombao =

Spanish athlete and businessman (1938–2020)

Personal information
- Born: 6 August 1938 Ribas de Sil, Spain
- Died: 23 April 2020 (aged 81)

Sport
- Sport: Track and field

Bernardino Lombao Sotuela (6 August 1938 – 23 April 2020) was a Spanish athlete, businessman, television presenter and sports coach.

== Trajectory ==
Lombao was born in Ribas de Sil, Lugo, Spain. He was an international athlete in 400 meters hurdles and decathlon between 1958 and 1967. He was also a Spanish handball champion with Atlético de Madrid in 1967, 1968 and 1969. After his retirement, he became coach of many Spanish athletes, with whom he achieved 18 Spanish and Olympic records. He also coached the Spanish basketball team in the junior, women's and men's categories. He was the physical trainer of José María Aznar during his period as President of the Government.

He also was host of television sports programs in the 1980s and 1990s such as De Olimpia a Los Ángeles and Objetivo 92. From 1999 to 2005 he directed the television sports program Escuela del deporte of La 2.

Until his death in 2020 he continued practicing athletics in the category of veterans.

Lombao died from COVID-19 in 2020.
