= Lucie Varga =

Austrian historian (1904–1941)

Lucie Varga (née Rosa Stern; 21 June 1904, in Baden – 26 April 1941, in Toulouse) was an Austrian historian, best remembered as a pioneer of the history of mentalities, as a member of the Annales school of social history. She wrote several articles for the Annales. Histoire, Sciences Sociales journal as an assistant to Lucien Febvre. Married to Franz Borkenau, her writings were popularised by Peter Schöttler.
