= Evangelos Depastas =

Greek middle-distance runner

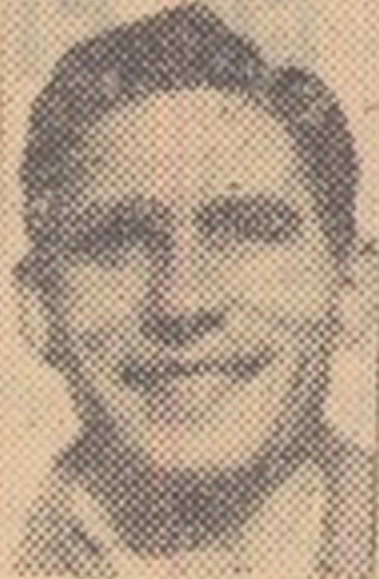

Personal information
- Nationality: Greek
- Born: 6 January 1932 Athens, Greece
- Died: 5 January 2009 (aged 76)

Sport
- Sport: Middle-distance running
- Event(s): 800m, 1500m

Evangelos Depastas (Greek: Ευάγγελος Δεπάστας; 6 January 1932 – 5 January 2009) was a Greek athlete. He competed at the 1956 Summer Olympics and the 1960 Summer Olympics. He was named the 1957 Greek Athlete of the Year.
