= Mohamed Saïd =

Moroccan long-distance runner

Personal information
- Nationality: Moroccan
- Born: 10 December 1934 (age 91)

Sport
- Sport: Long-distance running
- Event: 5000 metres

Mohamed Saïd (born 10 December 1934) is a Moroccan long-distance runner. He competed in the men's 5000 metres at the 1960 Summer Olympics.
