= Suh Yong-joo =

South Korean long jumper (1934–2005)

Personal information
- Born: 9 July 1934 Jeonbuk, South Korea
- Died: 29 August 2005 (aged 71) Goyang, South Korea

Sport
- Sport: Track and field
Medal record
Representing South Korea
Asian Games
Gold medal – first place	1958 Tokyo	Long jump

Suh Yong-Joo (Korean: 서영주; 9 July 1934 – 29 August 2005) was a South Korean long jumper who represented South Korea in the 1956 Summer Olympics and in the 1960 Summer Olympics.
