= Noriaki Yasuda =

Japanese pole vaulter (1935–2004)

Personal information
- Born: 11 December 1935 Taipei, Taiwan
- Died: 16 April 2004 (aged 68) Toyota, Aichi, Japan

Sport
- Sport: Track and field
- Event: Pole vault
Medal record
Representing Japan
Summer Universiade
Gold medal – first place	1959 Turin	Pole vault
Asian Games
Gold medal – first place	1958 Tokyo	Pole vault

Noriaki Yasuda (安田 矩明, Yasuda Noriaki) (11 December 1935 – 16 April 2004) was a Japanese former pole vaulter who competed in the 1960 Summer Olympics and the 1958 Asian Games.
