= Roger Bofferding =

Luxembourgish sprinter (1934–2026)

Personal information
- Nationality: Luxembourgish
- Born: 17 February 1934 Luxembourg City, Luxembourg
- Died: 20 February 2026 (aged 92)

Sport
- Sport: Sprinting
- Event: 200 metres

Roger Bofferding (17 February 1934 – 20 February 2026) was a Luxembourgish sprinter. He competed in the men's 200 metres at the 1960 Summer Olympics. Bofferding died on 20 February 2026, at the age of 92.
