= Ioannis Komitoudis =

Greek sprinter

Personal information
- Nationality: Greek
- Born: 3 January 1938 (age 88)

Sport
- Sport: Sprinting
- Event: 4 × 100 metres relay

Ioannis Komitoudis (born 3 January 1938) is a Greek sprinter. He competed in the men's 4 × 100 metres relay at the 1960 Summer Olympics.
