= Pierre-Yvon Lenoir =

French middle-distance runner

Pierre-Yvon Lenoir (8 August 1936 – 25 November 2015) was a French middle distance runner who competed in the 1960 Summer Olympics.
