= Tennis at the 1959 Summer Universiade =

Tennis events were contested at the 1959 Summer Universiade in Turin, Italy.

== Medal summary ==
| Event | Gold | Silver | Bronze |
|---|---|---|---|
| Men's Singles | François Jauffret (FRA) | Pavel Benda (TCH) | Massimo Drisaldi (ITA) |
| Men's Doubles | Takeo Hanna and Masao Nagasaki (JPN) | Günter Reimann and Klaus Wunderlich (FRG) | Michel Chevalier and François Jauffret (FRA) |
| Women's Singles | Irina Ermolova (URS) | Zdenka Strachová (TCH) | Maria Teresa Riedl (ITA) |
| Women's Doubles | Maria Chiara Ramorino and Maria Teresa Riedl (ITA) | Jitka Horcicková and Zdenka Strachová (TCH) | Heidi Haas and Gisela Timm (FRG) |
| Mixed Doubles | Maria Chiara Ramorino and Massimo Drisaldi (ITA) | Janine Lieffrig and Michel Chevalier (FRA) | Zdenka Strachová and Richard Schönborn (TCH) |

== Medal table ==
| Rank | Nation | Gold | Silver | Bronze | Total |
|---|---|---|---|---|---|
| 1 | Italy (ITA) | 2 | 0 | 2 | 4 |
| 2 | France (FRA) | 1 | 1 | 1 | 3 |
| 3 | Japan (JPN) | 1 | 0 | 0 | 1 |
| 3 | Soviet Union (URS) | 1 | 0 | 0 | 1 |
| 5 | Czechoslovakia (TCH) | 0 | 3 | 1 | 4 |
| 6 | West Germany (FRG) | 0 | 1 | 1 | 2 |
| Totals (6 entries) | | 5 | 5 | 5 | 15 |

== See also ==
- Tennis at the Summer Universiade
