= Aydin Onur =

Turkish sprinter

Personal information
- Nationality: Turkish
- Born: 29 October 1934 Ankara, Turkey
- Died: 1 August 2016 (aged 81)

Sport
- Sport: Sprinting
- Event: 100 metres

Aydin Onur (29 October 1934 – 1 August 2016) was a Turkish sprinter. He competed in the men's 100 metres and in the 200 metres at the 1960 Summer Olympics.
