= Salvatore Giannone =

Italian sprinter (1936–2024)

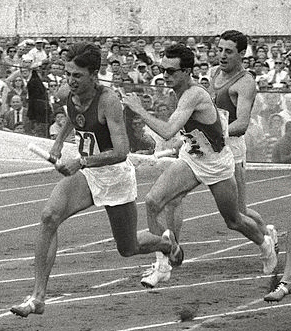
- Giannone (right) running the 4×100 m relay at the 1960 Olympics

Personal information
- Nationality: Italian
- Born: 24 July 1936 Trieste, Italy
- Died: 3 August 2024 (aged 88) Caserta, Italy
- Height: 1.76 m (5 ft 9 in)
- Weight: 74 kg (163 lb)

Sport
- Country: Italy
- Sport: Athletics
- Event: Sprint
- Club: Partenope

Achievements and titles
- Personal best: 200 m: 21.2 (1960)
Medal record
Summer Universiade
Gold medal – first place	1959 Turin	4×100 m relay

Salvatore Giannone (24 July 1936 – 3 August 2024) was an Italian sprinter. Running the 4×100 m relay he won a gold medal at the 1959 Summer Universiade and finished in fourth place at the 1960 Olympics. Giannone died on 3 August 2024, at the age of 88.

== See also ==
- Italy national relay team
