= Guido De Murtas =

Italian sprinter

Personal information
- Nationality: Italian
- Born: 5 February 1936 (age 90) Bologna, Italy

Sport
- Country: Italy
- Sport: Athletics
- Event: Sprint
Medal record
Summer Universiade
Gold medal – first place	1959 Turin	4×100 metres relay

Guido De Murtas (Bologna, 5 February 1936) is a retired Italian sprinter.

== Biography ==
He won one gold medal at the Summer Universiade, he has 6 caps in national team from 1958 to 1960.

== See also ==
- Italy national relay team
