= Jean-Pierre Barra =

Belgian sprinter

Personal information
- Nationality: Belgian
- Born: 16 May 1939 (age 87)

Sport
- Sport: Sprinting
- Event: 200 metres

Jean-Pierre Barra (born 16 May 1939) is a Belgian sprinter. He competed in the men's 200 metres at the 1960 Summer Olympics.
