= Robert Bogey =

French long-distance runner

Robert Bogey (born 26 November 1935) is a French former long-distance runner who competed in the 1960 Summer Olympics.
