= Romain Poté =

Belgian sprinter at 1960 Olympics (1935-2010)

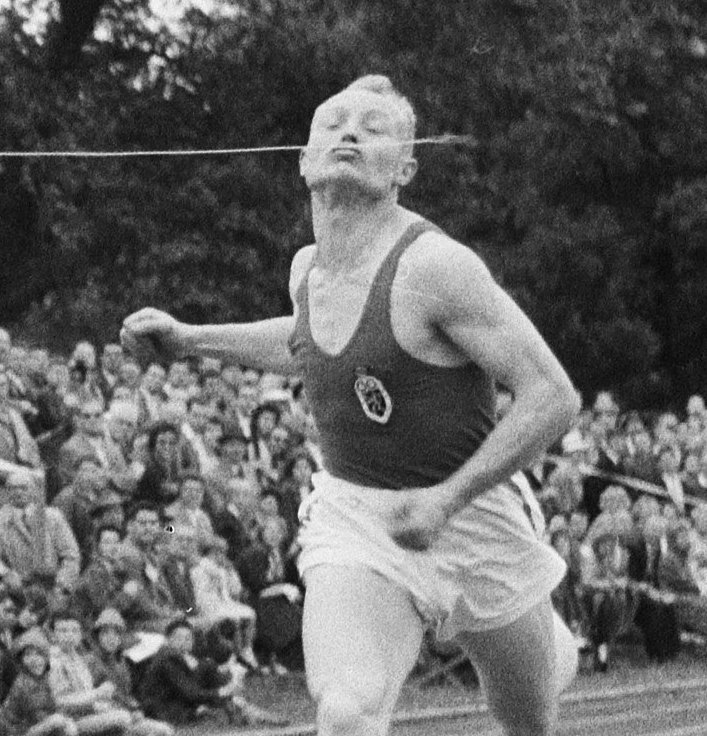
- Poté in 1960

Personal information
- Born: 1 December 1935 Wetteren, Belgium
- Died: 6 May 2010 (aged 74) Halle, Belgium
- Height: 177 cm (5 ft 10 in)
- Weight: 70 kg (154 lb)

Sport
- Events: 100 metres, 200 metres, long jump
- Club: KAA Gent
Medal record
Men's athletics
Representing Belgium
World University Games
| Bronze medal – third place | 1959 Turin | 100 m |

Romain Poté (1 December 1935 – 6 May 2010) was a Belgian sprinter and long jumper.

He competed in the 100 metres, 200 metres and long jump at the 1960 Summer Olympics. He won a bronze medal in the 1959 Summer Universiade in the men's 100 metres event. He became Belgian champion in the 200 metres in 1961.

His personal best times were 10.5 seconds in the 100 metres (1960); 21.3 seconds in the 200 metres (1960) and 7.47 metres in the long jump (1960). He had two better times disallowed; 10.4 "because of suspected but unverified wind assistance" as well as 21.2 in the 200 metres.

After his athletics, he worked as a traffic consultant, among others in the Adviesbureau Verkeer & Mobiliteit.
