= Dimitrios Skourtis =

Greek hurdler

Personal information
- Nationality: Greek
- Born: 1934 Athens, Greece
- Died: 2000 (aged 65–66)

Sport
- Sport: Track and field
- Event: 400 metres hurdles

Dimitrios Skourtis (1934–2000) was a Greek hurdler. He competed in the men's 400 metres hurdles at the 1960 Summer Olympics.
