= Giorgos Katsibardis =

Greek lawyer, athlete, writer, and politician

Giorgios Katsibardis
- Γιώργος Κατσιμπάρδης

Member of the Parliament of the Hellenes
- In office 1977–2000
- Constituency: Boeotia

Personal details
- Born: 26 January 1939
- Died: 26 July 2018 (aged 79)
- Party: Panhellenic Socialist Movement (PASOK)
- Education: University of Athens

Giorgios Katsibardis (Greek: Γιώργος Κατσιμπάρδης; 26 January 1939 – 26 July 2018) was a Greek lawyer, athlete, writer and politician, founding member of PASOK. He has been a deputy for Boeotia and a deputy minister, as well as the president of SEGAS.

He was born in 1939 in Domvraina, in Beotia. He studied law at the University of Athens and practiced law. Many times he has defended non-profit organizations and co-operatives. At the same time, he was a champion on speed roads, a member of the National Athletics and Balkan Team (1960).

His political activity began at the Regime of the Colonels, as a member of the anti-dictatorial Panhellenic Liberation Movement, while in 1974 he was a founding member of PASOK. He served as a member of the Parliament for Boeotia for 23 years (1977-2000), while during the same period he served as President of SEGAS (1984-1987) and Deputy Minister of the Interior (1987-1988).

He died on 26 July 2018 from drowning at the age of 79.
