= Hiroshi Shibata =

Japanese sprinter (born 1935)

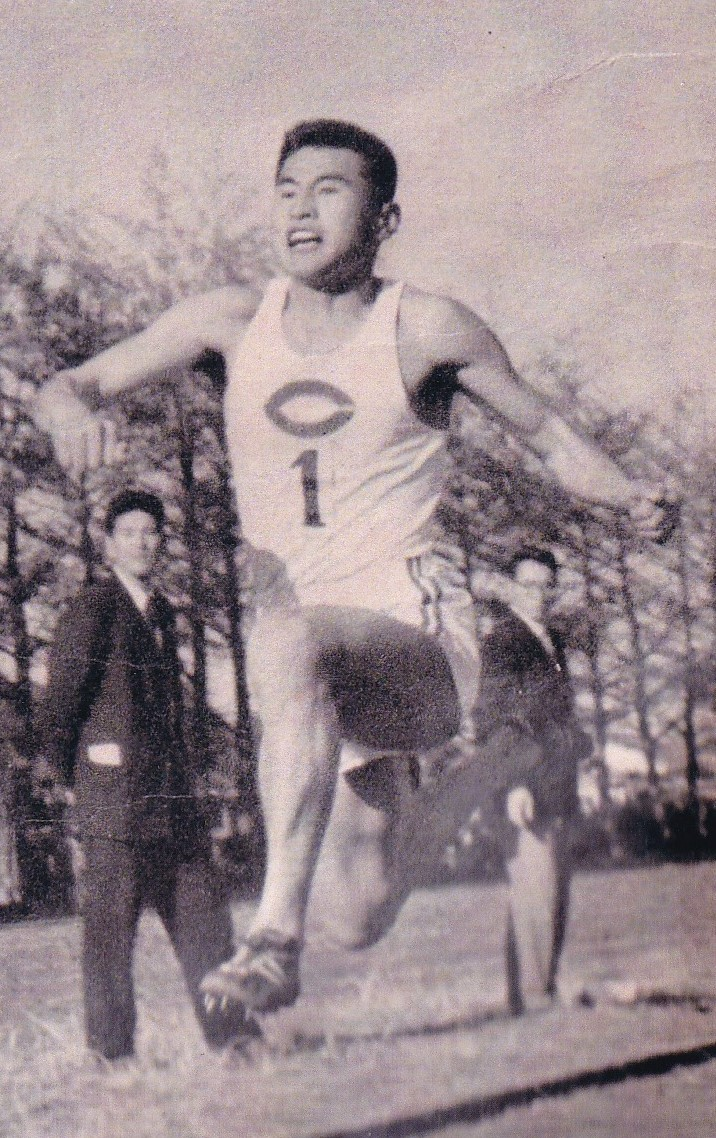
- Shibata in 1959

Personal information
- Nationality: Japanese
- Born: 26 July 1935 (age 90) Hyōgo Prefecture, Japan

Sport
- Sport: Sprinting
- Event(s): 4 × 100 metres relay, triple jump
Medal record
Representing Japan
Summer Universiade
Bronze medal – third place	1959 Turin	Triple jump

Hiroshi Shibata (柴田 宏, Shibata Hiroshi; born 26 July 1935) is a Japanese sprinter and triple jumper. He competed in the triple jump at the 1956 Summer Olympics and in the triple jump and the men's 4 × 100 metres relay at the 1960 Summer Olympics. After retiring, he has held a number of senior positions in athletics-related organisations, such as the Japan Association of Athletics Federations.
