= Koji Sakurai =

Japanese triple jumper

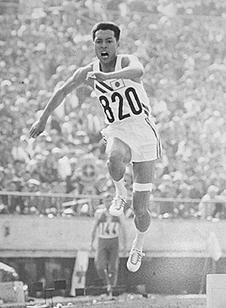
- Koji Sakurai at the 1964 Olympics

Personal information
- Born: 18 February 1936 (age 90) Tokyo, Japan
- Height: 1.72 m (5 ft 8 in)
- Weight: 67 kg (148 lb)

Sport
- Sport: Triple jump
- Club: Waseda University, Tokyo
Medal record
Asian Games
Silver medal – second place	1958 Tokyo	Triple jump
Gold medal – first place	1962 Jakarta	Triple jump
Summer Universiade
Silver medal – second place	1959 Turin	Triple jump

Koji Sakurai (桜井 孝次, Sakurai Kōji; born 18 February 1936) is a Japanese retired triple jumper. He competed at the 1956, 1960 and 1964 Olympics with the best achievement of seventh place in 1956. His personal best was 16.18 m, set in 1963.

Sakurai finished second behind fellow Japanese athlete Tomio Ota in the triple jump event at the British 1962 AAA Championships and won the event at the 1963 AAA Championships.
