= Athletics at the 1959 Summer Universiade =

Athletics at the I Summer Universiade
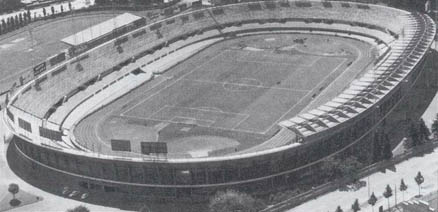
- Dates: 3–6 September
- Host city: Turin, Italy
- Venue: Stadio Comunale di Torino
- Events: 29

Athletics events were contested at the 1959 Summer Universiade in Turin, Italy.

== Medal summary ==
=== Men ===
Event	Gold		Silver		Bronze	
100 metres	Livio Berruti (ITA)	10.5	Jean-Claude Penez (FRA)	10.8	Romain Poté (BEL)	10.8
200 metres	Livio Berruti (ITA)	20.9	Nikolaos Georgopoulos (GRE)	21.6	Fritz Helfrich (FRG)	21.7
400 metres	Viktor Šnajder (YUG)	47.5	Walter Oberste (FRG)	47.9	Otto Klappert (FRG)	47.9
800 metres	Dieter Heydecke (FRG)	1:50.5	John Holt (GBR)	1:50.5	Kuniaki Watanabe (JPN)	1:50.9
1500 metres	Béla Szekeres (HUN)	3:50.9	John Winch (GBR)	3:52.0	Kuniaki Watanabe (JPN)	3:52.1
5000 metres	Kevin Gilligan (GBR)	14:09.8	Saburo Yokomizo (JPN)	14:14.8	Jaroslav Bohatý-Pavelka (TCH)	14:18.0
110 metres hurdles	Stanko Lorger (YUG)	14.2	Nereo Svara (ITA)	14.4	Giorgio Mazza (ITA)	14.4
400 metres hurdles	Salvatore Morale (ITA)	52.1	Germano Gimelli (ITA)	52.8	Wiesław Król (POL)	53.2
4 × 100 metres relay	Italy (ITA); Guido De Murtas; Salvatore Giannone; Giorgio Mazza; Livio Berruti	41.0	West Germany (FRG); Rudolf Sundermann; Martin Reichert; Burkhart Quantz; Fritz Helfrich	41.0	France (FRA); Ali Brakchi; Joël Caprice; Jean-Claude Penez; Guy Lagorce	41.4
4 × 400 metres relay	West Germany (FRG); Albert Grawitz; Burkhart Quantz; Walter Oberste; Otto Klappert	3:09.5	Italy (ITA); Elio Catola; Nereo Fossati; Mario Fraschini; Germano Gimelli	3:11.4	Great Britain (GBR); Robert Hay; Mike Robinson; John Holt; Norman Futter	3:12.2
High jump	Cornel Porumb (ROM)	2.01	Vladimir Marjanović (YUG)	1.96	Raycho Aleksandrov (URS); Kazimierz Fabrykowski (POL)	1.96
Pole vault	Noriaki Yasuda (JPN)	4.35	Mirko Kuzmanovic (YUG)	4.30	Bernard Balastre (FRA)	4.20
Long jump	Attilio Bravi (ITA)	7.46	Maurizio Terenziani (ITA)	7.43	Ali Brakchi (FRA)	7.42
Triple jump	Oleg Ryakhovskiy (URS)	15.74	Koji Sakurai (JPN)	15.55	Hiroshi Shibata (JPN)	15.44
Shot put	Hermann Lingnau (FRG)	17.32	Zsigmond Nagy (HUN)	17.10	Georgios Tsakanikas (GRE)	16.70
Discus throw	Antonios Kounadis (GRE)	53.07	Vladimir Lyakhov (URS)	52.79	Eugeniusz Wachowski (POL)	52.22
Hammer throw	Gyula Zsivótzky (HUN)	63.65	Anatoliy Samotsvetov (URS)	63.61	Krešimir Račić (YUG)	62.32
Javelin throw	Hermann Salomon (FRG)	75.95	Gergely Kulcsár (HUN)	75.80	Alexandru Bizim (ROM)	72.81
Pentathlon	Vasili Kuznetsov (URS)	4006	Hermann Salomon (FRG)	3530	Miloš Vojtek (TCH)	3048

=== Women ===
Event	Gold		Silver		Bronze	
100 metres	Giuseppina Leone (ITA)	11.7	Lyudmila Nechayeva (URS)	12.0	Catherine Capdevielle (FRA)	12.1
200 metres	Giuseppina Leone (ITA)	23.8	Barbara Janiszewska (POL)	24.2	Lyudmila Nechayeva (URS)	24.7
800 metres	Nicole Goullieux (FRA)	2:11.1	Edith Schiller (FRG)	2:11.3	Klavdiya Babintseva (URS)	2:12.3
80 metres hurdles	Nelli Yelisayeva (URS)	11.1	Snezhana Kerkova (BUL)	11.4	Elżbieta Krzesińska (POL)	11.5
4 × 100 metres relay	Soviet Union (URS); Nelli Yeliseyeva; Larisa Kuleshova; Tamara Makarova; Lyudmila Nechayeva	46.9	Italy (ITA); Anna Doro; Fausta Galluzzi; Giuseppina Leone; Nadia Mecocci	47.5	West Germany (FRG); Ilsabe Heider; Antje Gleichfeld; Kristianne Foss; Inge Fuhrmann	48.1
High jump	Iolanda Balaș (ROM)	1.80	Valentina Ballod (URS)	1.73	Jarosława Jóźwiakowska (POL)	1.61
Long jump	Elżbieta Krzesińska (POL)	5.94	Tamara Makarova (URS)	5.76	Larisa Kuleshova (URS)	5.71
Shot put	Lidiya Sharamovich (BUL)	13.97	Milena Usenik (YUG)	13.90	Antonia Vehoff (FRG)	13.11
Discus throw	Györgyi Hegedus (HUN)	46.76	Elivia Ricci (ITA)	45.56	Ida Bucsányi (HUN)	43.38
Javelin throw	Elvīra Ozoliņa (URS)	49.95	Urszula Figwer (POL)	47.02	Maria Diţi (ROM)	46.86

== Medal table ==
Rank	Nation	Gold	Silver	Bronze	Total
1	Italy (ITA)	7	6	1	14
2	Soviet Union (URS)	5	5	4	14
3	West Germany (FRG)	4	4	4	12
4	Hungary (HUN)	3	2	1	6
5	Yugoslavia (YUG)	2	3	1	6
6	Romania (ROM)	2	0	2	4
7	Poland (POL)	1	2	5	8
8	Japan (JPN)	1	2	3	6
9	Great Britain (GBR)	1	2	1	4
10	France (FRA)	1	1	4	6
11	Greece (GRE)	1	1	1	3
12	Bulgaria (BUL)	1	1	0	2
13	Czechoslovakia (TCH)	0	0	2	2
14	Belgium (BEL)	0	0	1	1
Totals (14 entries)		29	29	30	88

== See also ==
- FISU World University Games
- University and college sport
