= 1959 Summer Universiade =

Multi-sport event in Turin, Italy

I Summer Universiade I Universiade estiva
- Host city: Turin, Italy
- Motto: Universal understanding
- Nations: 45
- Athletes: 985
- Events: 60 in 7 sports
- Opening: August 26, 1959
- Closing: September 7, 1959
- Opened by: Giovanni Gronchi
- Main venue: Stadio Comunale

The 1959 Summer Universiade, also known as the I Summer Universiade, took place in Turin, Italy.

== Sports ==
- Athletics
- Basketball
- Fencing
- Swimming
- Tennis
- Volleyball
- Water polo

== Medal table ==
Italy leads this first edition in the total medals count.

* Host nation (Italy)

Rank	Nation	Gold	Silver	Bronze	Total
1	Italy*	18	10	10	38
2	Soviet Union (URS)	11	8	5	24
3	West Germany (FRG)	6	9	10	25
4	Hungary (HUN)	6	5	2	13
5	France (FRA)	4	2	8	14
6	Great Britain (GBR)	3	6	1	10
7	Yugoslavia (YUG)	3	3	2	8
8	Czechoslovakia (TCH)	2	5	5	12
9	Japan (JPN)	2	2	3	7
10	Romania (ROU)	2	1	2	5
11	Poland (POL)	1	5	8	14
12	Greece (GRE)	1	1	1	3
13	Bulgaria (BUL)	1	1	0	2
14	East Germany (GDR)	0	1	0	1
14	Switzerland (SUI)	0	1	0	1
16	Belgium (BEL)	0	0	1	1
16	Netherlands (NED)	0	0	1	1
16	Spain (ESP)	0	0	1	1
16	Sweden (SWE)	0	0	1	1
Totals (19 entries)		60	60	61	181
