= 1959 Mediterranean Games =

3rd edition of the Mediterranean Games

III Mediterranean Games Beirut 1959
- Host city: Beirut, Lebanon
- Nations: 11
- Athletes: 792
- Events: 106 in 16 sports
- Opening: 11 October 1959
- Closing: 23 October 1959
- Opened by: Fuad Chehab
- Main venue: Camille Chamoun Stadium

The 1959 Mediterranean Games, officially known as the III Mediterranean Games, and commonly known as Beirut 1959, were the 3rd Mediterranean Games. After visiting Africa and Europe, the Mediterranean Games were for the first time held in Asia in Beirut, Lebanon, thus completing the trio of continents belonging to the Mediterranean Sea.

The Games took place over 12 days, from 11 to 23 October 1959. There were 792 athletes (all men) from 11 countries participating. There were a total of 106 medal events from 17 different sports. At the end of the competition, France was on top again. The United Arab Republic (UAR), participating for the first time, came in second, and Turkey came third.

== Participating nations ==
The following is a list of nations that participated in the 1959 Mediterranean Games:

- France (66)
- Greece (69)
- Italy (55)
- Lebanon (180)
- Malta (2)
- Morocco (14)
- Spain (83)
- Tunisia (28)
- Turkey (91)
- United Arab Republic (162)
- Yugoslavia (42)

== Sports ==
The 1959 Mediterranean Games sports program featured 106 men-only events in 16 sports. The number in parentheses next to the sport is the number of medal events per sport.

Three sports from the 1955 games – field hockey, roller hockey and rugby – were all dropped from the program. Rowing competition also was not held. In wrestling, 8 Freestyle events returned having skipped 1955, and in sailing only one event was held (down from three in 1955).

- Athletics (23)
- Basketball (1)
- Boxing (10)
- Cycling (6)
- Diving (2)
- Equestrian (6)
- Fencing (6)
- Football (1)
- Gymnastics (8)
- Sailing (1)
- Shooting (9)
- Swimming (8)
- Volleyball (1)
- Water polo (1)
- Weightlifting (7)
- Wrestling (16)

== Medal table ==
* Host nation (Lebanon)

Rank	Nation	Gold	Silver	Bronze	Total
1	France	26	27	16	69
2	United Arab Republic	23	21	30	74
3	Turkey	13	8	1	22
4	Italy	12	5	4	21
5	Yugoslavia	11	9	8	28
6	Greece	8	9	13	30
7	Spain	5	12	12	29
8	Lebanon*	3	10	17	30
9	Tunisia	3	2	1	6
10	Morocco	2	3	2	7
Totals (10 entries)		106	106	104	316
