= Athletics at the 1965 Summer Universiade – Men's 4 × 400 metres relay =

The men's 4 × 400 metres relay event at the 1965 Summer Universiade was held at the People's Stadium in Budapest on 26 and 29 August 1965.

== Results ==
=== Heats ===
Rank	Heat	Nation	Athletes	Time	Notes
1	1	West Germany	Werner Tiemann, Manfred Hanike, Dirk von Maltitz, Fritz Roth	3:11.3	Q
2	1	Italy	Gian Paolo Iraldo, Bruno Bianchi, Sergio Bello, Roberto Frinolli	3:11.4	Q
3	1	Sweden	Anders Lärkert, Ulle Heed, Hans-Olof Johansson, Bo Althoff	3:11.7	Q
4	1	France	Jean-Jacques Behm, Pierre Gaudry, Didier Gustin, Didier Samper	3:11.7	Q
5	1	Great Britain	Jim Barry, John Sherwood, Menzies Campbell, Neil Palmer	3:12.6	
6	1	Japan	Masami Yoshida, Kiyoo Yui, Toru Honda, Yoshinori Sakai	3:14.1	
1	2	United States	Bill Toomey, Ron Whitney, George German, Lynn Saunders	3:12.6	Q
2	2	Hungary	Csaba Csutorás, István Gyulai, Gyula Rábai, László Mihályfi	3:12.9	Q
3	2	Czechoslovakia	Svatopluk Matolín, Jaromír Berger, Petr Blaha, Viktor Eichler	3:14.5	Q
4	2	Soviet Union	Anatoliy Kazakov, Vladimir Rusin, Vladimir Koshakov, Valeriy Simarev	3:16.8	Q
5	2	Belgium	Herman Van Coppenolle, Karel Brems, Jacques Pennewaert, Henri De Ridder	3:20.0	
	2	Poland	Joachim Sznapka, Marian Filipiuk, Wojciech Lipoński, Zbigniew Makulec	DQ	

=== Final ===
Rank	Nation	Athletes	Time	Notes
1st place, gold medalist(s)	Italy	Gian Paolo Iraldo, Bruno Bianchi, Roberto Frinolli, Sergio Bello	3:08.5	UR
2nd place, silver medalist(s)	Hungary	Csaba Csutorás, István Gyulai, Gyula Rábai, László Mihályfi	3:08.7	
3rd place, bronze medalist(s)	West Germany	Werner Tiemann, Manfred Hanike, Dirk von Maltitz, Fritz Roth	3:08.8	
4	France	Jean-Jacques Behm, Pierre Gaudry, Didier Gustin, Didier Samper	3:09.1	
5	Sweden	Anders Lärkert, Ulle Heed, Hans-Olof Johansson, Bo Althoff	3:09.4	
6	United States	Bill Toomey, Ron Whitney, George German, Lynn Saunders	3:10.1	
7	Czechoslovakia	Svatopluk Matolín, Jaromír Berger, Petr Blaha, Viktor Eichler	3:15.5	
	Soviet Union		DNS	
