= Athletics at the 1964 Summer Olympics – Men's 4 × 400 metres relay =

Men's 4 × 400 metres relay at the Games of the XVIII Olympiad
- Venue: Olympic Stadium
- Dates: 20–21 October 1964
- Competitors: 80 from 20 nations

Medalists
1st place, gold medalist(s)		Ollan Cassell; Mike Larrabee; Ulis Williams; Henry Carr	United States
2nd place, silver medalist(s)		Tim Graham; Adrian Metcalfe; John Cooper; Robbie Brightwell	Great Britain
3rd place, bronze medalist(s)		Edwin Skinner; Kent Bernard; Edwin Roberts; Wendell Mottley	Trinidad and Tobago

The men's 4 × 400 metres relay was the longer of the two men's relays on the Athletics at the 1964 Summer Olympics program in Tokyo. It was held on 20 October and 21 October 1964. 20 teams, for a total of 80 athletes, from 20 nations entered, with 3 teams of 4 not starting in the first round. The first round was held on 20 October with the final on 21 October.

The final of the 4 × 400 relay was the last event on the athletics schedule to begin, though the marathon was still in progress when the 4 × 400 finished.

== Results ==
=== First round ===
The top two teams in each of the 3 heats as well as the two fastest remaining teams advanced.

==== First round, heat 1 ====
Place	Nation	Athletes	Time
1	United States	Henry Carr; Ollan Cassell; Mike Larrabee; Ulis Williams	3:05.3
2	Soviet Union	Hryhoriy Sverbetov; Viktor Bychkov; Vasyl Anisimov; Vadym Arkhypchuk	3:07.4
3	France	Germain Nelzy; Michel Hiblot; Bernard Martin; Jean Pierre Boccardo	3:07.5
4	India	Makhan Singh; Amrit Pal; Ajmer Singh; Milkha Singh	3:08.8
5	Japan	Toru Honda; Hirotada Hayase; Yoshihiro Amano; Masami Yoshida	3:12.3
6	Senegal	Daour M'baye Guèye; Daniel Thiaw; Mamadou N'Diaye; Papa M'Baye N'Diaye	3:12.5
—	Uganda	Unknown	Did not start

==== First round, heat 2 ====
Place	Nation	Athletes	Time
1	Trinidad and Tobago	Edwin Skinner; Kent Bernard; Edwin Roberts; Wendell Mottley	3:05.0
2	Poland	Marian Filipiuk; Ireneusz Kluczek; Stanisław Swatowski; Andrzej Badeński	3:07.2
3	Italy	Bruno Bianchi; Salvatore Morale; Roberto Frinolli; Sergio Bello	3:07.6
4	Australia	Peter Vassella; Gary Knoke; Gary Eddy; Ken Roche	3:08.2
—	Hungary	Unknown	Did not start
—	Iraq	Unknown	Did not start

==== First round, heat 3 ====
Place	Nation	Athletes	Time
1	Great Britain	Tim Graham; Adrian Metcalfe; John Cooper; Robbie Brightwell	3:04.7
2	United Team of Germany	Jörg Jüttner; Hans-Ullrich Schulz; Johannes Schmitt; Manfred Kinder	3:04.9
3	Jamaica	Laurie Khan; Malcolm Spence; Mel Spence; George E. Kerr	3:05.3
4	Switzerland	Jean-Louis Descloux; Hansjörg Bosshard; Marius Theiler; Peter Laeng	3:09.3
5	Ghana	James Addy; Brobbey Mensah; Samuel Zanya Bugri; Ebenezer Quartey	3:10.4
6	Malaysia	Karu Selvaratnam; Kuda Ditta; Mohamed bin Abdul Rahman; Victor Asirvatham	3:17.6
7	Thailand	Somsakdi Tongsuke; Nipon Pensuvapap; Adisorn Vitsudhamakul; Manun Bumroonspruek	3:18.4

=== Final ===
Carr moved from initial position to anchor for the United States team as they set a new world record, followed closely by Great Britain and Northern Ireland as well as Trinidad and Tobago. All three teams were under the old world record time.

France also shuffled their lineup, moving Nelzy to third from first.

Place	Nation	Athletes	Time
1	United States	Ollan Cassell; Mike Larrabee; Ulis Williams; Henry Carr	3:00.7 WR
2	Great Britain	Tim Graham; Adrian Metcalfe; John Cooper; Robbie Brightwell	3:01.6
3	Trinidad and Tobago	Edwin Skinner; Kent Bernard; Edwin Roberts; Wendell Mottley	3:01.7
4	Jamaica	Laurie Khan; Malcolm Spence; Melville Spence; George E. Kerr	3:02.3
5	United Team of Germany	Jörg Jüttner; Hans-Ullrich Schulz; Johannes Schmitt; Manfred Kinder	3:04.3
6	Poland	Marian Filipiuk; Ireneusz Kluczek; Stanisław Swatowski; Andrzej Badeński	3:05.3
7	Soviet Union	Hryhoriy Sverbetov; Viktor Bychkov; Vasyl Anisimov; Vadym Arkhypchuk	3:05.9
8	France	Michel Hiblot; Bernard Martin; Germain Nelzy; Jean Pierre Boccardo	3:07.4
