= 1962 European Athletics Championships – Men's 4 × 400 metres relay =

Relay Race 1962

Men's 4 × 400 metres relay at the European Athletics Championships

The men's 4 × 400 metres relay at the 1962 European Athletics Championships was held in Belgrade, then Yugoslavia, at JNA Stadium on 16 September 1962.

== Medalists ==
| Gold | Johannes Schmitt; Wilfried Kindermann; Hans-Joachim Reske; Manfred Kinder; West Germany |
| Silver | Barry Jackson; Ken Wilcock; Adrian Metcalfe; Robbie Brightwell; Great Britain |
| Bronze | Bruno Galliker; Marius Theiler; Hansruedi Bruder; Jean-Louis Descloux; Switzerland |

== Results ==
=== Final ===
16 September

| Rank | Nation | Competitors | Time | Notes |
|---|---|---|---|---|
| 1st place, gold medalist(s) | West Germany | Johannes Schmitt; Wilfried Kindermann; Hans-Joachim Reske; Manfred Kinder | 3:05.8 | CR |
| 2nd place, silver medalist(s) | Great Britain | Barry Jackson; Ken Wilcock; Adrian Metcalfe; Robbie Brightwell | 3:05.9 | |
| 3rd place, bronze medalist(s) | Switzerland | Bruno Galliker; Marius Theiler; Hansruedi Bruder; Jean-Louis Descloux | 3:07.0 | NR |
| 4 | Sweden | Bo Althoff; Ronny Sunesson; Bengt-Göran Fernström; Hans-Olof Johansson | 3:07.7 | NR |
| 5 | Italy | Mario Fraschini; Vittorio Barberis; Gian Paolo Iraldo; Salvatore Morale | 3:07.8 | |
| 6 | France | Jean Bertozzi; Bernard Martin; Jean-Pierre Boccardo; Germain Nelzy | 3:08.9 | |

=== Heats ===
16 September

==== Heat 1 ====
| Rank | Nation | Competitors | Time | Notes |
|---|---|---|---|---|
| 1 | Great Britain | Barry Jackson; Ken Wilcock; Adrian Metcalfe; Robbie Brightwell | 3:09.4 | Q |
| 2 | Italy | Mario Fraschini; Vittorio Barberis; Gian Paolo Iraldo; Salvatore Morale | 3:10.0 | Q |
| 3 | Sweden | Bo Althoff; Ronny Sunesson; Bengt-Göran Fernström; Hans-Olof Johansson | 3:10.2 | Q |
| 4 | Soviet Union | Viktor Bychkov; Valeriy Bulyshev; Vadym Arkhypchuk; Vasyl Anisimov | 3:10.6 | |
| 5 | Yugoslavia | Srđan Savić; Miloje Grujić; Viktor Šnajder; Miroslav Bosnar | 3:12.5 | |
| | Czechoslovakia | Jaromír Šlégr; Jan Kasal; Josef Odložil; Josef Trousil | DNF | |

==== Heat 2 ====
| Rank | Nation | Competitors | Time | Notes |
|---|---|---|---|---|
| 1 | West Germany | Johannes Schmitt; Wilfried Kindermann; Hans-Joachim Reske; Manfred Kinder | 3:08.8 | Q |
| 2 | France | Jean Bertozzi; Bernard Martin; Jean-Pierre Boccardo; Germain Nelzy | 3:09.2 | Q |
| 3 | Switzerland | Bruno Galliker; Marius Theiler; Hansruedi Bruder; Jean-Louis Descloux | 3:09.7 | Q |
| 4 | Poland | Andrzej Badeński; Stanisław Swatowski; Ireneusz Kluczek; Jerzy Kowalski | 3:10.2 | |
| 5 | Finland | Börje Strand; Pentti Rekola; Olavi Salonen; Jussi Rintamäki | 3:13.8 | |
| 6 | Turkey | Gürkan Çevik; Fahir Özgüden; Ferruh Oygur; Muharrem Dalkılıç | 3:21.3 | |

== Participation ==
According to an unofficial count, 48 athletes from 12 countries participated in the event.

- Czechoslovakia (4)
- Finland (4)
- France (4)
- Italy (4)
- Poland (4)
- Soviet Union (4)
- Sweden (4)
- Switzerland (4)
- Turkey (4)
- Great Britain (4)
- West Germany (4)
- Yugoslavia (4)
