= Athletics at the 1964 Summer Olympics – Men's 400 metres =

Men's 400 metres at the Games of the XVIII Olympiad
- Venue: Olympic Stadium
- Dates: 17–19 October 1964
- Competitors: 50 from 33 nations
- Winning time: 45.1

Medalists
1st place, gold medalist(s)		Mike Larrabee	United States
2nd place, silver medalist(s)		Wendell Mottley	Trinidad and Tobago
3rd place, bronze medalist(s)		Andrzej Badeński	Poland

The men's 400 metres was the third-shortest of the men's track races in the Athletics at the 1964 Summer Olympics program in Tokyo. It was held on 17 October, 18 October, and 19 October 1964. 55 athletes from 36 nations entered, with 5 not starting in the first round. The first two rounds were held on 17 October, with the semifinals on 18 October and the final on 19 October. The maximum number of athletes per nation had been set at 3 since the 1930 Olympic Congress. The event was won by 0.1 seconds by Mike Larrabee of the United States, the third consecutive and tenth overall victory for an American in the event. Trinidad and Tobago and Poland each earned their first medal in the 400 metres.

== Background ==
This was the fifteenth appearance of the event, which is one of 12 athletics events to have been held at every Summer Olympics. None of the finalists from 1960 returned. The United States again had a strong team; Henry Carr would have been favored, but ran only in the 200 metres and the 4 × 400 metres relay. Ulis Williams was the 1962 and 1963 AAU champion, but Mike Larrabee matched the world record to win the U.S. Olympic trials. Other contenders included 1962 European champion Robbie Ian Brightwell of Great Britain and Wendell Mottley of Trinidad and Tobago.

Hong Kong, Iran, the Ivory Coast, Senegal, and Tanzania appeared in this event for the first time. South Korea and Mongolia had entrants, but did not start. The United States made its fifteenth appearance in the event, the only nation to compete in it at every Olympic Games to that point.

== Competition format ==
The competition retained the basic four-round format from 1920. A significant change, however, was the introduction of the "fastest loser" system. Previously, advancement depended solely on the runners' place in their heat. The 1964 competition added advancement places to the fastest runners across the heats in the first round who did not advance based on place. The 1964 event also increased the standard heat size to 8 athletes.

There were 7 heats in the first round, each scheduled to have 7 or 8 athletes but with one dropping to as low as 5 after withdrawals. The top four runners in each heat advanced to the quarterfinals, along with the next four fastest runners overall. There were 4 quarterfinals of 8 runners each; the top four athletes in each quarterfinal heat advanced to the semifinals. The semifinals featured 2 heats of 8 runners each. The top four runners in each semifinal heat advanced, making an eight-man final.

== Records ==
Prior to the competition, the existing World and Olympic records were as follows.

World record	Otis Davis (USA)	44.9	Rome, Italy	6 September 1960
Olympic record	Otis Davis (USA)	44.9	Rome, Italy	6 September 1960

No records were set during this event.

== Schedule ==
All times are Japan Standard Time (UTC+9)

Date	Time	Round
Saturday, 17 October 1964	10:00; 15:00	Round 1 Quarterfinals
Sunday, 18 October 1964	15:20	Semifinals
Monday, 19 October 1964	13:00	Final

== Results ==
=== First round ===
The top four runners in each of the 7 heats advanced.

==== Heat 1 ====
Rank	Athlete	Nation	Time (hand)	Time (automatic)	Notes
1	Wendell Mottley	Trinidad and Tobago	45.9	45.94	Q
2	Robbie Ian Brightwell	Great Britain	46.1	46.13	Q
3	Jean-Pierre Boccardo	France	46.6	46.63	Q
4	Gary Eddy	Australia	46.9	46.92	Q
5	Stanisław Swatowski	Poland	47.6	–	
6	István Gyulai	Hungary	48.0	–	
7	Didier Mejía	Mexico	48.1	–	
—	Chang Jong Kil	South Korea	DNS	–	

==== Heat 2 ====
Rank	Athlete	Nation	Time (hand)	Time (automatic)	Notes
1	Kent Bernard	Trinidad and Tobago	46.8	46.80	Q
2	Sergio Bello	Italy	47.5	47.54	Q
3	Vadym Arkhypchuk	Soviet Union	47.7	47.70	Q
4	Tim Graham	Great Britain	48.4	–	Q
5	Arsenio Jazmin	Philippines	49.9	–	
—	Amarsanaa Dulam	Mongolia	DNS	–	
—	Wesley Johnson	Liberia	DNS	–	
—	Samuel Owusa-Mensah	Ghana	DNS	–	

==== Heat 3 ====
Rank	Athlete	Nation	Time (hand)	Time (automatic)	Notes
1	Andrzej Badeński	Poland	46.4	46.46	Q
2	Adrian Peter Metcalfe	Great Britain	46.7	46.79	Q
3	Jörg Jüttner	United Team of Germany	47.0	47.06	Q
4	Rupert Hoilette	Jamaica	47.5	47.50	Q
5	Amos Omolo	Uganda	47.6	47.65	
6	Juan Carlos Dyrzka	Argentina	48.3	–	
7	Amadou Gakou	Senegal	50.1	–	
8	Daniel Thomas	Tanzania	50.4	–	

==== Heat 4 ====
Rank	Athlete	Nation	Time (hand)	Time (automatic)	Notes
1	Ulis Williams	United States	46.2	46.20	Q
2	Edwin Skinner	Trinidad and Tobago	46.5	46.50	Q
3	Tegegn Bezabih	Ethiopia	46.7	46.73	Q
4	Peter Vassella	Australia	46.7	46.77	Q
5	Johannes Schmitt	United Team of Germany	46.9	46.90	q
6	Muhammad Sadiq	Pakistan	47.3	–	q
7	Víctor Maldonado	Venezuela	47.7	–	
8	Jacques Pennewaert	Belgium	47.7	–	

==== Heat 5 ====
Rank	Athlete	Nation	Time (hand)	Time (automatic)	Notes
1	Ollan Cassell	United States	46.8	46.81	Q
2	William Crothers	Canada	46.8	46.86	Q
3	James Addy	Ghana	47.2	47.27	Q
4	Pedro Grajales	Colombia	47.2	47.28	Q
5	Viktor Bychkov	Soviet Union	47.3	47.32	q
6	Jürgen Kalfelder	United Team of Germany	47.7	47.77	
7	Yoyaga Dit Coulibaly	Ivory Coast	48.8	–	
—	George E. Kerr	Jamaica	DNS	–	

==== Heat 6 ====
Rank	Athlete	Nation	Time (hand)	Time (automatic)	Notes
1	Mike Larrabee	United States	46.8	46.88	Q
2	Ebenezer Quartey	Ghana	47.1	47.12	Q
3	Peter Laeng	Switzerland	47.1	47.12	Q
4	Hryhoriy Sverbetov	Soviet Union	47.3	47.37	Q
5	Ken Roche	Australia	47.4	47.43	q
6	Somsakdi Tongsuke	Thailand	48.9	–	
7	Jasim Karim Kuraishi	Iraq	49.5	–	

==== Heat 7 ====
Rank	Athlete	Nation	Time (hand)	Time (automatic)	Notes
1	Josef Trousil	Czechoslovakia	47.0	47.04	Q
2	Wilson Kiprugut	Kenya	47.1	47.04	Q
3	Laurie Khan	Jamaica	47.2	47.25	Q
4	Ireneusz Kluczek	Poland	47.3	47.35	Q
5	Hortensio Fucil	Venezuela	47.9	47.95	
6	Hayase Hirotada	Japan	48.5	–	
7	William Hill	Hong Kong	48.7	–	
8	Hossein Ghafourizadeh	Iran	50.8	–	

=== Quarterfinals ===
The four fastest runners in each of the four heats advanced to the semifinals.

==== Quarterfinal 1 ====
Rank	Athlete	Nation	Time (hand)	Time (automatic)	Notes
1	Wendell Mottley	Trinidad and Tobago	45.8	45.88	Q
2	Ollan Cassell	United States	46.2	46.24	Q
3	Jean Pierre Boccardo	France	46.3	46.34	Q
4	Peter Vassella	Australia	46.5	46.55	Q
5	Peter Laeng	Switzerland	46.7	46.72	
6	Sergio Bello	Italy	46.9	46.93	
7	Ebenezer Quartey	Ghana	47.0	47.06	
8	Muhammad Sadiq	Pakistan	48.0	–	

==== Quarterfinal 2 ====
Rank	Athlete	Nation	Time (hand)	Time (automatic)	Notes
1	Andrzej Badeński	Poland	46.5	46.51	Q
2	William Crothers	Canada	46.7	46.73	Q
3	Tim Graham	Great Britain	46.8	46.83	Q
4	Laurie Khan	Jamaica	46.9	46.97	Q
5	Josef Trousil	Czechoslovakia	47.2	47.22	
6	Johannes Schmitt	United Team of Germany	47.2	47.24	
7	Ken Roche	Australia	48.0	–	
8	Hryhoriy Sverbetov	Soviet Union	48.0	–	

==== Quarterfinal 3 ====
Rank	Athlete	Nation	Time (hand)	Time (automatic)	Notes
1	Mike Larrabee	United States	46.5	46.57	Q
2	Kent Bernard	Trinidad and Tobago	46.7	46.73	Q
3	Robbie Ian Brightwell	Great Britain	47.1	47.15	Q
4	Jörg Jüttner	United Team of Germany	47.2	47.22	Q
5	Rupert Hoilette	Jamaica	47.6	47.60	
6	Gary Eddy	Australia	47.6	47.65	
7	Wilson Kiprugut	Kenya	47.7	–	
8	Vadym Arkhypchuk	Soviet Union	47.9	–	

==== Quarterfinal 4 ====
Rank	Athlete	Nation	Time (hand)	Time (automatic)	Notes
1	Edwin Skinner	Trinidad and Tobago	46.9	46.90	Q
2	Ulis Williams	United States	46.9	46.96	Q
3	Tegegn Bezabih	Ethiopia	47.2	47.23	Q
4	James Addy	Ghana	47.3	47.37	Q
5	Adrian Peter Metcalfe	Great Britain	47.8	47.81	
6	P. A. Grajales Escobar	Colombia	47.8	47.86	
7	Viktor Bychkov	Soviet Union	47.9	47.91	
—	Ireneusz Kluczek	Poland	DNS	–	

=== Semifinals ===
The top four runners in each of the two semifinals advanced to the final.

==== Semifinal 1 ====
Rank	Athlete	Nation	Time (hand)	Time (automatic)	Notes
1	Robbie Ian Brightwell	Great Britain	45.7	45.79	Q
2	Wendell Mottley	Trinidad and Tobago	45.9	45.96	Q
3	Ulis Williams	United States	46.2	46.29	Q
4	Peter Vassella	Australia	46.5	46.52	Q
5	Jörg Jüttner	United Team of Germany	46.7	46.78	
6	Laurie Khan	Jamaica	47.0	–	
7	Tegegn Bezabih	Ethiopia	47.1	–	
8	Jean Pierre Boccardo	France	47.1	–	

==== Semifinal 2 ====
Rank	Athlete	Nation	Time (hand)	Time (automatic)	Notes
1	Mike Larrabee	United States	46.0	46.02	Q
2	Andrzej Badeński	Poland	46.2	46.21	Q
3	Edwin Skinner	Trinidad and Tobago	46.5	46.50	Q
4	Tim Graham	Great Britain	46.5	46.53	Q
5	Ollan Cassell	United States	46.6	46.69	
6	William Crothers	Canada	46.9	46.96	
7	Kent Bernard	Trinidad and Tobago	47.1	47.08	
8	James Addy	Ghana	47.6	47.67	

=== Final ===
Rank	Lane	Athlete	Nation	Time (hand)	Time (automatic)	Notes
1st place, gold medalist(s)	5	Mike Larrabee	United States	45.1	45.15	
2nd place, silver medalist(s)	7	Wendell Mottley	Trinidad and Tobago	45.2	45.24	
3rd place, bronze medalist(s)	2	Andrzej Badeński	Poland	45.6	45.64	
4	6	Robbie Ian Brightwell	Great Britain	45.7	45.75	
5	8	Ulis Williams	United States	46.0	46.01	
6	1	Tim Graham	Great Britain	46.0	46.08	
7	3	Peter Vassella	Australia	46.3	46.32	
8	4	Edwin Skinner	Trinidad and Tobago	46.8	–	
