= Athletics at the 1963 Summer Universiade – Men's 400 metres =

The men's 400 metres event at the 1963 Summer Universiade was held at the Estádio Olímpico Monumental in Porto Alegre in September 1963.

== Medalists ==
Gold	Silver	Bronze
Adrian Metcalfe; Great Britain	Hans-Joachim Reske; West Germany	Jacques Pennewaert; Belgium

== Results ==
=== Heats ===
Rank	Heat	Name	Nationality	Time	Notes
1	1	Johannes Schmitt	West Germany	48.6	Q
2	1	Mario Fraschini	Italy	49.1	Q
3	1	Hirotada Hayase	Japan	49.5	
4	1	Gaston Fouchard	France	49.6	
1	2	Hans-Joachim Reske	West Germany	47.45	Q
2	2	István Gyulai	Hungary	47.81	Q
3	2	Menzies Campbell	Great Britain	47.92	
4	2	Sergio Bello	Italy	48.6	
5	2	Ademar Rocha Filho	Brazil	52.2	
1	3	Jacques Pennewaert	Belgium	48.03	Q
2	3	Adrian Metcalfe	Great Britain	48.14	Q
3	3	Jean-Pierre Vitasse	France	48.4	
4	3	Shlomo Nitzani	Israel	48.7	
5	3	Carlo Milani	Brazil	52.2	

=== Final ===
Rank	Athlete	Nationality	Time	Notes
1st place, gold medalist(s)	Adrian Metcalfe	Great Britain	46.75	
2nd place, silver medalist(s)	Hans-Joachim Reske	West Germany	46.92	
3rd place, bronze medalist(s)	Jacques Pennewaert	Belgium	47.02	
4	Johannes Schmitt	West Germany	47.49	
5	István Gyulai	Hungary	48.40	
6	Mario Fraschini	Italy	48.54	
