= 1962 European Athletics Championships – Men's 400 metres =

Men's 400 metres at the European Athletics Championships

The men's 400 metres at the 1962 European Athletics Championships was held in Belgrade, then Yugoslavia, at JNA Stadium on 12, 13, and 14 September 1962.

== Medalists ==
Gold	Robbie Brightwell; Great Britain
Silver	Manfred Kinder; West Germany
Bronze	Hans-Joachim Reske; West Germany

== Results ==
=== Final ===
14 September

Rank	Name	Nationality	Time	Notes
1st place, gold medalist(s)	Robbie Brightwell	Great Britain	45.9	CR
2nd place, silver medalist(s)	Manfred Kinder	West Germany	46.1	
3rd place, bronze medalist(s)	Hans-Joachim Reske	West Germany	46.4	
4	Adrian Metcalfe	Great Britain	46.4	
5	Barry Jackson	Great Britain	46.6	
6	Andrzej Badeński	Poland	47.4	

=== Semi-finals ===
13 September

==== Semi-final 1 ====
Rank	Name	Nationality	Time	Notes
1	Robbie Brightwell	Great Britain	46.4	Q
2	Andrzej Badeński	Poland	46.5	Q
3	Josef Trousil	Czechoslovakia	46.6	
4	Jacques Pennewaert	Belgium	46.8	
5	Sergio Bello	Italy	47.8	
6	Viktor Bychkov	Soviet Union	48.3	

==== Semi-final 2 ====
Rank	Name	Nationality	Time	Notes
1	Hans-Joachim Reske	West Germany	46.1	CR Q
2	Adrian Metcalfe	Great Britain	46.2	Q
3	Jerzy Kowalski	Poland	46.3	
4	Vadym Arkhypchuk	Soviet Union	46.7	
5	Mario Fraschini	Italy	47.0	
6	Ronny Sunesson	Sweden	47.4	

==== Semi-final 3 ====
Rank	Name	Nationality	Time	Notes
1	Manfred Kinder	West Germany	46.5	Q
2	Barry Jackson	Great Britain	46.5	Q
3	Hans-Olof Johansson	Sweden	46.7	
4	Hansrüdi Bruder	Switzerland	46.9	
5	Vittorio Barberis	Italy	47.9	
	Jean Bertozzi	France	DNS	

=== Heats ===
12 September

==== Heat 1 ====
Rank	Name	Nationality	Time	Notes
1	Josef Trousil	Czechoslovakia	48.3	Q
2	Vittorio Barberis	Italy	48.4	Q
3	Jerzy Kowalski	Poland	49.8	Q
4	Rudi Matt	Liechtenstein	50.5	

==== Heat 2 ====
Rank	Name	Nationality	Time	Notes
1	Vadym Arkhypchuk	Soviet Union	47.4	Q
2	Jacques Pennewaert	Belgium	47.4	Q
3	Sergio Bello	Italy	47.6	Q
4	Bengt-Göran Fernström	Sweden	47.7	

==== Heat 3 ====
Rank	Name	Nationality	Time	Notes
1	Manfred Kinder	West Germany	47.1	Q
2	Barry Jackson	Great Britain	47.7	Q
3	Viktor Bychkov	Soviet Union	48.2	Q
4	Vasilios Syllis	Greece	48.4	

==== Heat 4 ====
Rank	Name	Nationality	Time	Notes
1	Hans-Joachim Reske	West Germany	46.9	Q
2	Andrzej Badeński	Poland	47.4	Q
3	Jean Bertozzi	France	47.6	Q
4	Gürkan Çevik	Turkey	50.0	

==== Heat 5 ====
Rank	Name	Nationality	Time	Notes
1	Robbie Brightwell	Great Britain	46.6	Q
2	Hans-Olof Johansson	Sweden	47.2	Q
3	Mario Fraschini	Italy	47.3	Q
4	Miloje Grujić	Yugoslavia	47.5	

==== Heat 6 ====
Rank	Name	Nationality	Time	Notes
1	Hansrüdi Bruder	Switzerland	47.5	Q
2	Adrian Metcalfe	Great Britain	47.6	Q
3	Ronny Sunesson	Sweden	47.6	Q
4	Miroslav Bosnar	Yugoslavia	48.0	

== Participation ==
According to an unofficial count, 24 athletes from 14 countries participated in the event.

- Belgium (1)
- Czechoslovakia (1)
- France (1)
- Greece (1)
- Italy (3)
- Liechtenstein (1)
- Poland (2)
- Soviet Union (2)
- Sweden (3)
- Switzerland (1)
- Turkey (1)
- Great Britain (3)
- West Germany (2)
- Yugoslavia (2)
