= Athletics at the 1963 Summer Universiade – Men's 4 × 400 metres relay =

The men's 4 × 400 metres relay event at the 1963 Summer Universiade was held at the Estádio Olímpico Monumental in Porto Alegre in September 1963.

== Results ==
Rank	Nation	Athletes	Time	Notes
1st place, gold medalist(s)	Great Britain	Adrian Metcalfe, John Boulter, Menzies Campbell, Dick Steane	3:12.02	
2nd place, silver medalist(s)	West Germany	Peter Hoppe, Wolfgang Scholl, Johannes Schmitt, Hans-Joachim Reske	3:13.02	
3rd place, bronze medalist(s)	Italy	Sergio Bello, Marco Busatto, Mario Fraschini, Roberto Frinolli	3:13.65	
4	France	Gaston Fouchard, Robert Poirier, Edmond Van Praagh, Jean-Pierre Vitasse	3:15.0	
5	Brazil	Ademar Rocha Filho, Anubes da Silva, João Gonçales, Carlo Milani	3:30.2	
