= Athletics at the 1965 Summer Universiade – Men's 400 metres =

The men's 400 metres event at the 1965 Summer Universiade was held at the People's Stadium in Budapest on 25, 26 and 27 August 1965.

== Medalists ==
Gold	Silver	Bronze
Sergio Bello; Italy	Fred van Herpen; Netherlands	Lynn Saunders; United States

== Results ==
=== Heats ===
Rank	Heat	Athlete	Nationality	Time	Notes
1	1	Bruno Bianchi	Italy	48.9	Q
2	1	Werner Thiemann	West Germany	49.1	Q
3	1	Lynn Saunders	United States	49.5	Q
4	1	Pierre Gaudry	France	49.5	Q
5	1	Alan Brereton	Canada	50.1	
6	1	Yoshinori Sakai	Japan	50.2	
1	2	Manfred Hanike	West Germany	48.6	Q
2	2	Marian Filipiuk	Poland	48.7	Q
3	2	Anders Lärkert	Sweden	48.9	Q
4	2	Jean-Pierre Boccardo	France	49.5	Q
5	2	Niklaus Haas	Switzerland	49.9	
6	2	Ivan Ivanov	Bulgaria	50.6	
1	3	Masami Yoshida	Japan	50.0	Q
2	3	Wojciech Lipoński	Poland	51.4	Q
3	3	Enrique Bondía	Spain	52.2	Q
4	3	Josef Hegyes	Czechoslovakia	53.2	Q
1	4	Fred van Herpen	Netherlands	48.5	Q
2	4	Sergio Bello	Italy	48.7	Q
3	4	Bo Althoff	Sweden	49.0	Q
4	4	Rogelio Rivas	Spain	49.0	Q
5	4	Jaromír Haisl	Czechoslovakia	49.3	
6	4	Vladimir Koshchakov	Soviet Union	49.6	

=== Semifinals ===
Rank	Heat	Athlete	Nationality	Time	Notes
1	1	Sergio Bello	Italy	47.7	Q
2	1	Pierre Gaudry	France	48.0	Q
3	1	Lynn Saunders	United States	48.1	Q
4	1	Wojciech Lipoński	Poland	48.1	Q
5	1	Manfred Hanike	West Germany	48.2	
6	1	Anders Lärkert	Sweden	48.4	
7	1	Rogelio Rivas	Spain	48.4	PB
8	1	Josef Hegyes	Czechoslovakia	49.7	
1	2	Bo Althoff	Sweden	48.2	Q
2	2	Werner Thiemann	West Germany	48.3	Q
3	2	Jean-Pierre Boccardo	France	48.3	Q
4	2	Fred van Herpen	Netherlands	48.6	Q
5	2	Marian Filipiuk	Poland	48.8	
6	2	Bruno Bianchi	Italy	48.9	
7	2	Masami Yoshida	Japan	49.9	
8	2	Enrique Bondía	Spain	51.0	

=== Final ===
Rank	Name	Nationality	Time	Notes
1st place, gold medalist(s)	Sergio Bello	Italy	46.8	
2nd place, silver medalist(s)	Fred van Herpen	Netherlands	46.9	=NR
3rd place, bronze medalist(s)	Lynn Saunders	United States	47.2	
4	Bo Althoff	Sweden	47.3	
5	Wojciech Lipoński	Poland	47.7	
6	Werner Thiemann	West Germany	47.8	
7	Pierre Gaudry	France	47.8	
8	Jean-Pierre Boccardo	France	48.1	
