= Athletics at the 1965 Summer Universiade – Men's 800 metres =

The men's 800 metres event at the 1965 Summer Universiade was held at the People's Stadium in Budapest on 25, 26 and 27 August 1965.

== Medalists ==
Gold	Silver	Bronze
Bill Crothers; Canada	George Germann; United States	Rudolf Klaban; Austria

== Results ==
=== Heats ===
Rank	Heat	Athlete	Nationality	Time	Notes
1	1	John Boulter	Great Britain	1:51.6	Q
2	1	Petr Blaha	Czechoslovakia	1:51.8	Q
3	1	Jacques Pennewaert	Belgium	1:52.0	Q
4	1	Roberto Curti	Switzerland	1:52.2	Q
5	1	Leszek Targos	Poland	1:54.7	
6	1	Elio Sicari	Italy	1:54.7	
	1	Virgilio González	Spain	DQ	
1	2	Bill Crothers	Canada	1:52.7	Q
2	2	Lorant Stoll	Hungary	1:52.8	Q
3	2	Michel Samper	France	1:53.2	Q
4	2	Karl-Uno Olofsson	Sweden	1:53.2	Q
5	2	Dave Cropper	Great Britain	1:53.3	
1	3	George Germann	United States	1:50.3	Q
2	3	Jan Kasal	Czechoslovakia	1:50.7	Q
3	3	Didier Gustin	France	1:50.7	Q
4	3	Arnd Krüger	West Germany	1:50.87	Q
5	3	Imre Nagy	Hungary	1:51.3	
6	3	Norbert Haupert	Luxembourg	1:52.4	
7	3	Gianfranco Carabelli	Italy	1:56.7	
	3	Ioannis Hrisanthopoulos	Greece	DQ	
1	4	Franz-Josef Kemper	West Germany	1:53.8	Q
2	4	Rudolf Klaban	Austria	1:53.8	Q
3	4	Henri De Ridder	Belgium	1:54.3	Q
4	4	Janusz Grzeszczuk	Poland	1:54.3	Q
6	4	Vladimir Rusin	Soviet Union	1:55.3	
7	4	Konstantinos Mihailidis	Greece	1:56.7	
8	4	Hanspeter Born	Switzerland	1:58.1	

=== Semifinals ===
Rank	Heat	Athlete	Nationality	Time	Notes
1	1	Bill Crothers	Canada	1:51.4	Q
2	1	Rudolf Klaban	Austria	1:51.6	Q
3	1	George Germann	United States	1:51.7	Q
4	1	Michel Samper	France	1:51.7	Q
5	1	Petr Blaha	Czechoslovakia	1:52.0	
6	1	Arnd Krüger	West Germany	1:52.2	
7	1	Roberto Curti	Switzerland	1:54.3	
8	1	Henri De Ridder	Belgium	1:59.3	
1	2	Didier Gustin	France	1:51.5	Q
2	2	John Boulter	Great Britain	1:51.6	Q
3	2	Jan Kasal	Czechoslovakia	1:51.7	Q
4	2	Karl-Uno Olofsson	Sweden	1:51.8	Q
5	2	Jacques Pennewaert	Belgium	1:52.5	
6	2	Janusz Grzeszczuk	Poland	1:54.5	
7	2	Lorant Stoll	Hungary	1:58.5	
8	2	Franz-Josef Kemper	West Germany	1:58.5	

=== Final ===
Rank	Name	Nationality	Time	Notes
1st place, gold medalist(s)	Bill Crothers	Canada	1:47.7	
2nd place, silver medalist(s)	George Germann	United States	1:47.8	
3rd place, bronze medalist(s)	Rudolf Klaban	Austria	1:48.2	
4	Jan Kasal	Czechoslovakia	1:48.8	
5	John Boulter	Great Britain	1:48.9	
6	Michel Samper	France	1:49.2	
7	Karl-Uno Olofsson	Sweden	1:49.2	
8	Didier Gustin	France	1:49.5	
