= Filipiak =

Filipiak is a Polish patronymic surname derived from the given namee Filip. Notable people with the surname include:

- Bartosz Filipiak (born 1994), Polish volleyball player
- Bolesław Filipiak (1901–1978), Polish Cardinal
- Carl Filipiak, American jazz guitarist
- Izabela Filipiak, Polish writer
- Kacper Filipiak, Polish snooker player

== See also ==
- Filipiuk
- Pilipiuk
