= Bernard Martin =

Bernard Martin may refer to:

- Bernard Martin (New Zealand politician) (1882–1956), New Zealand politician of the Labour Party
- Bernard F. Martin (1845–1914), American politician from Manhattan, New York City
- Bernard Martin (rugby league) (1909–1991), Australian rugby league player
- Bernard Martin (athlete) (born 1943), French sprinter
- Bernard Martin (environmentalist) (born 1954), Canadian fisherman and environmentalist
