= Bosshard =

Bosshard is a surname. Notable people with the name include:

- Hansjörg Bosshard (born 1940), Swiss sprinter
- Kobi Bosshard (born 1939), Swiss-born New Zealand jeweller
- Otto Bosshard (1876–1943), American lawyer and politician
- Rudolf Bosshard (1890–1980), Swiss rower
- Walter Bosshard (photojournalist) (1892–1975), Swiss photographer and reporter
- Walter Bosshard (footballer) (1921–1984), Swiss footballer

== See also ==
- Bosshardt
