= Barry Jackson (athlete) =

English sprinter

Personal information
- Nationality: British (English)
- Born: 22 August 1941 (age 84) Birmingham, England
- Height: 175 cm (5 ft 9 in)
- Weight: 74 kg (163 lb)

Sport
- Sport: Athletics
- Event: 400m
- Club: Lozells Harriers
Medal record
Men's athletics
Representing Great Britain
European Championships
Silver medal – second place	1962 Belgrade	4x400 metres relay
Representing England
British Empire and Commonwealth Games
Silver medal – second place	1962 Perth	4 × 440 yards relay

Barry Douglas Jackson (born August 22, 1941) is a retired track and field runner from England who competed at the 1960 Summer Olympics.

== Biography ==
At the 1960 Olympic Games in Rome, Jackson represented Great Britain in the 4 x 400 metres relay event.

jackson finished second behind Adrian Metcalfe in the 440 yards event at the 1961 AAA Championships.

Jackson helped Britain win the silver medal in the men's 4 x 400 metres at the 1962 European Championships in Belgrade, Yugoslavia, alongside Ken Wilcock, Adrian Metcalfe and Robbie Brightwell. He represented England and won a silver medal in the 4 × 440 yards relay at the 1962 British Empire and Commonwealth Games in Perth, Western Australia.
