= Muhammad Sadiq =

Muhammad Sadiq, or other spelling variations, may refer to:

- Mohammad Sadiq (painter) (active 1740s–1790s), Iranian painter
- Muhammad III as-Sadiq (1813–1882), Bey of Tunis
- Muhammad Sadiq (photographer) (1822 or 1832 – 1902), Ottoman Egyptian army engineer and surveyor
- Mohammed Ahmed Sadek (active 1917–1991), Egyptian soldier and defence minister
- Muhammad Sadiq (boxer) (born 1934), Pakistani boxer
- Muhammad Sadiq (sprinter) (born 1938), Pakistani sprinter
- Muhammad Siddique (born 1948), Pakistani middle-distance runner
- Muhammad Sadiq (singer) (born 1942), Indian singer, actor and politician
- Muhammad Qasim Sadiq (died 1943), Pakistani Sufi sheikh
- Mohammad Sadique (born 1955), Bangladeshi writer and public official
- Mohammed Sadiq (diplomat) (active 1990s–2023), Pakistan's ambassador to Afghanistan
- Mohamed Sadek (footballer, born 1997), Egyptian footballer
- Mohamad Omar Sadek (born 2003), Lebanese footballer
- Sadiq (Indian actor)

== See also ==
- Sadiq Mohammad (born 1945), Pakistani cricketer
- Muhammad Sadiq Ardestani (died 1721), Iranian Shia philosopher
- Muhammad Sadiq Hassan (1886–1967), Iraqi poet
- Mohammad Sadeq Rouhani (1926–2022), Iranian grand ayatollah
- Muhammad Sadik Muhammad Yusuf (born 1952–2015), Uzbekistani Muslim scholar
- Mohammad Seddigh Kaboudvand (born 1963), Iranian Kurdish activist and journalist
- Mufti Muhammad Sadiq (1872–1957), Indian Muslim missionary
- Ghulam Mohammed Sadiq (1912–1971), Indian politician
- Ghulam Mohammad Sadiq, Pakistani Islamic scholar
- Sheikh Muhammad Sadiq, Pakistani lyricist and poet
