= Jean-Louis Descloux =

Swiss sprinter (born 1937)

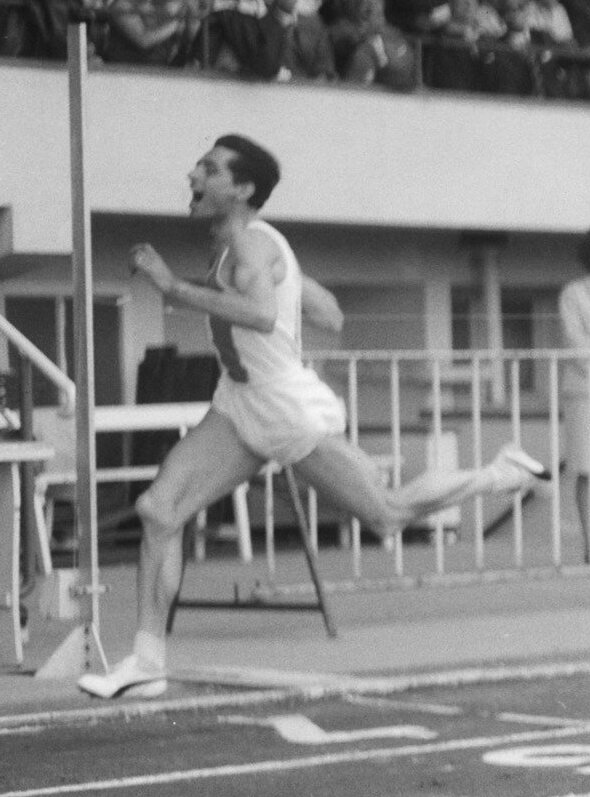
- Descloux in 1966

Personal information
- Nationality: Swiss
- Born: 3 November 1937 (age 88)
- Height: 1.76 m (5 ft 9 in)

Sport
- Event: 200 metres
Medal record
Men's athletics
Representing Switzerland
European Championships
Bronze medal – third place	1962 Belgrade	4×400 m

Jean-Louis Descloux (born 3 November 1937) is a Swiss sprinter. He is best known for winning a bronze medal at the 1962 European Athletics Championships.

He won a bronze medal in the 4 × 400 metres relay at the 1962 European Championships, running together with Bruno Galliker, Marius Theiler and Hansruedi Bruder. Descloux also competed in the 100 and 200 metres without reaching the final.

At the 1964 Summer Olympics he competed in the 200 metres and the 4 × 400 metres relay without reaching the final. He also competed in the 400 metres at the 1966 European Indoor Games without reaching the final.

His personal best times were 21.2 seconds in the 200 metres (1962) and 47.2 seconds in the 400 metres (1964).
