= Bruno Galliker =

Swiss hurdler (1931–2020)

Medal record

Men's athletics

Representing Switzerland

European Championships
Bronze medal – third place	1958 Stockholm	400 m hurdles
Bronze medal – third place	1962 Belgrade	4x400 m

Bruno Galliker (29 December 1931 – 27 May 2020) was a Swiss hurdler. After his career, he became a sports reporter at Swiss Radio.

Galliker was born Emmenbrücke, and did not take up athletes until he was 23 years old after completing his apprenticeship as a banker, he originally competed for BTV Lucerne, before moving to Zürich and competing for BT Unterstrass. In 1958 he competed at the 1958 European Athletics Championships, which were held in Stockholm, he entered the 400 metres hurdles, and in the semi-finals he broke the Swiss National record and then in the final he ran the same time 51.8 seconds to win the bronze medal, Galliker also competed in the 4 × 400 metres relay but the team came last in there heat.

At the 1960 Summer Olympics, held in Rome, Galliker competed in the 400 metres hurdles. He won his first round heat in 51.2 seconds and then finished third in his semi-final to qualify for the final. In the final, he ran 51.11 seconds and finished sixth; due to this achievement, he was voted Swiss Sports Personality of the Year.

Two years later at the 1962 European Athletics Championships, Galliker could only reach the semi-finals in the 400 metres hurdles, but in the 4 × 400 metres relay, with Marius Theiler, Hansruedi Bruder and Jean-Louis Descloux, the team set a National record in winning the bronze medal.

He became Swiss champion in 1960, 1962, 1963 and 1964; and also in the 200 metres hurdles in 1963. His personal best time (with electronic timing) was 51.11 seconds (1960).

Galliker died aged 88 years due to a self-inflicted accident in Zürich.
