= Walter Bosshard =

Walter Bosshard may refer to:

- Walter Bosshard (footballer) (1921–1984), Swiss footballer
- Walter Bosshard (photojournalist) (1892–1975), Swiss photographer and journalist
