= Hansruedi Bruder =

Swiss sprinter (born 1937)

Medal record

Men's athletics

Representing Switzerland

European Championships
Bronze medal – third place	1962 Belgrade	4×400 m

Hansruedi Bruder (2 June 1937 – 19 January 1998) was a Swiss sprinter who specialized in the 400 metres. He was born in Schinznach and competed for the club TV Olten. He finished sixth in the 4 × 400 metres relay at the 1960 Olympic Games with the team René Weber, Ernst Zaugg and Christian Wägli. He won a bronze medal in 4 × 400 metres relay at the 1962 European Championships with Jean-Louis Descloux, Marius Theiler and Bruno Galliker. He became Swiss champion in 1961, 1962, and 1963. His personal best time was 46.6 seconds (1961).
