= Per-Owe Trollsås =

Swedish athletics competitor (1933–2000)

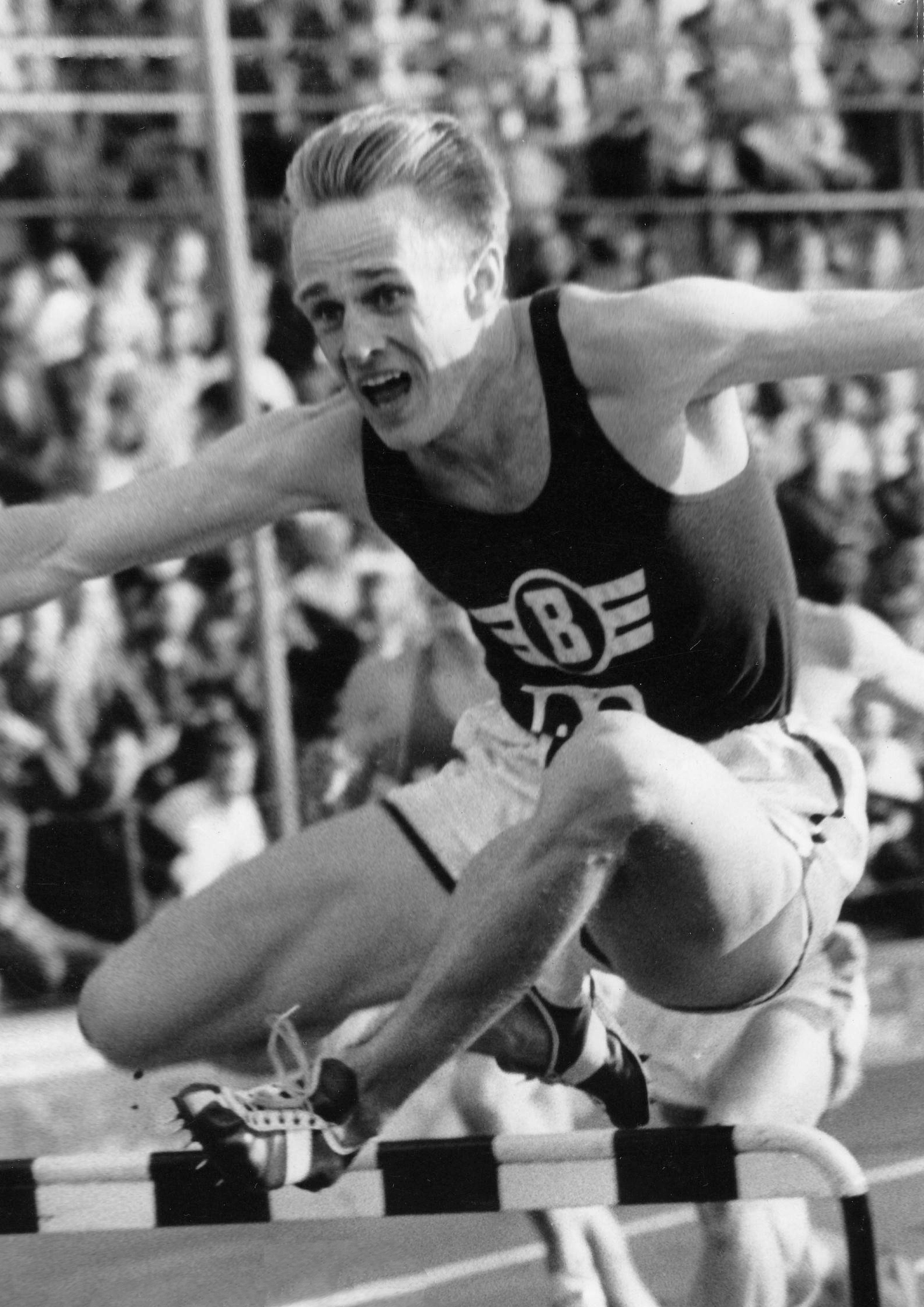

Personal information
- Born: 18 January 1933 Vaplan, Sweden
- Died: 5 November 2000 (aged 67) Järfälla, Sweden
- Height: 1.69 m (5 ft 7 in)
- Weight: 60 kg (130 lb)

Sport
- Sport: Athletics
- Event(s): 100–800 m, hurdles
- Club: Näldens IF; Stockholms Studenters IF; Bromma IF

Achievements and titles
- Personal best(s): 100 m – 10.6; 200 m – 21.6; 400 m – 47.6 (1958); 800 m – 1:55.0; 110 mH – 15.3; 400 mH – 51.0 (1958)
Medal record
Men's athletics
Representing Sweden
European Championships
Silver medal – second place	1958 Stockholm	400 m hurdles

Per-Owe "Trollet" Trollsås (18 January 1933 – 5 November 2000) was a Swedish sprinter who won a silver medal in the 400 m hurdles at the 1958 European Athletics Championships, setting a national record in the semifinal. He competed in the 400 m hurdles and 4 × 400 m relay at the 1960 Summer Olympics, but failed to reach the finals.

Trollsås won national titles in the 100 m (1952–53), 400 m hurdles (1957–60) and 4 × 400 m relay (1958). After retiring from competitions he served as vice-chairman of the Stora Grabbars Association for many years.
