= Mike Larrabee =

American sprinter

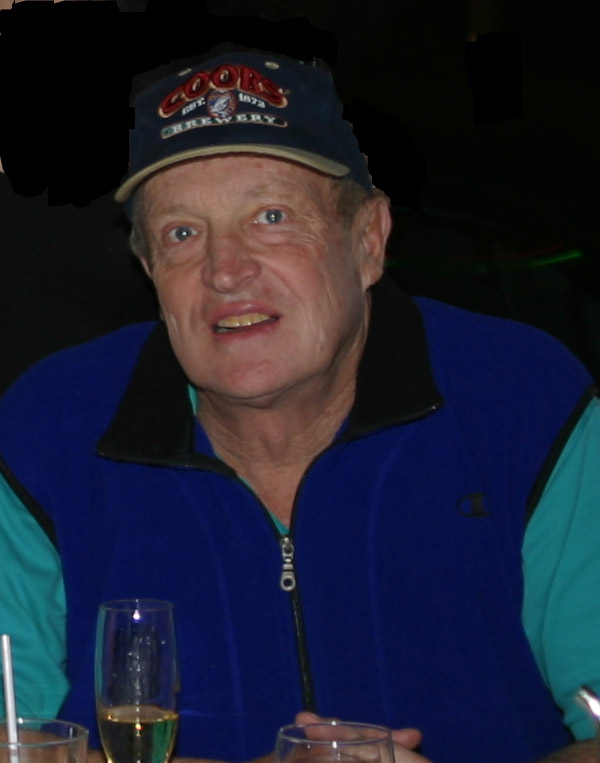

Personal information
- Born: December 2, 1933 Hollywood, California, USA
- Died: April 22, 2003 (aged 69) Santa Maria, California, USA
- Height: 186 cm (6 ft 1 in)
- Weight: 77 kg (170 lb)

Sport
- Sport: Athletics
- Event: 400m
- Club: Southern California Striders
Medal record
Men's athletics
Representing the United States
Olympic Games
Gold medal – first place	1964 Tokyo	400 metres
Gold medal – first place	1964 Tokyo	4 × 400 m relay

Michael Denny Larrabee (December 2, 1933 – April 22, 2003) was an American athlete, winner of two gold medals at the 1964 Summer Olympics.

== Biography ==
Born in Hollywood, California and raised in Ventura, Larrabee was a young running talent in the mid-1950s. In 1952, his athletic performances earned him a scholarship at the University of Southern California, from which he graduated as a geology major. A series of injuries hampered his running career, causing him to miss out on the 1956 and 1960 Olympics, but he had his best season in 1964.

He won his only AAU title in 400 m, then he won the 400 m (tying the world record of 44.9 seconds) at the 1964 Olympic Trials in Los Angeles. In the Tokyo Olympics final, Larrabee was in fifth place going into the final turn, then passed everyone in front of him with a burst of speed to win the gold medal in 45.1. Larrabee also ran the second leg on United States gold medal winning 4 × 400 m relay team that won in the world record time of 3:00.7.

Larrabee won the British AAA Championships title in the 440 yards event at the 1965 AAA Championships.

After the athletics, Larrabee worked as a mathematics teacher at James Monroe High School, ran a beverage distributing company with his brother and worked part-time as Adidas' U.S. shoe representative to track and field, a position that allowed him to travel and keep connected to the sport.

Larrabee remained physically active well after his running career had wound down, taking up tennis, scuba diving, skiing, hiking (for which he raised llamas as pack animals) and mountain climbing.

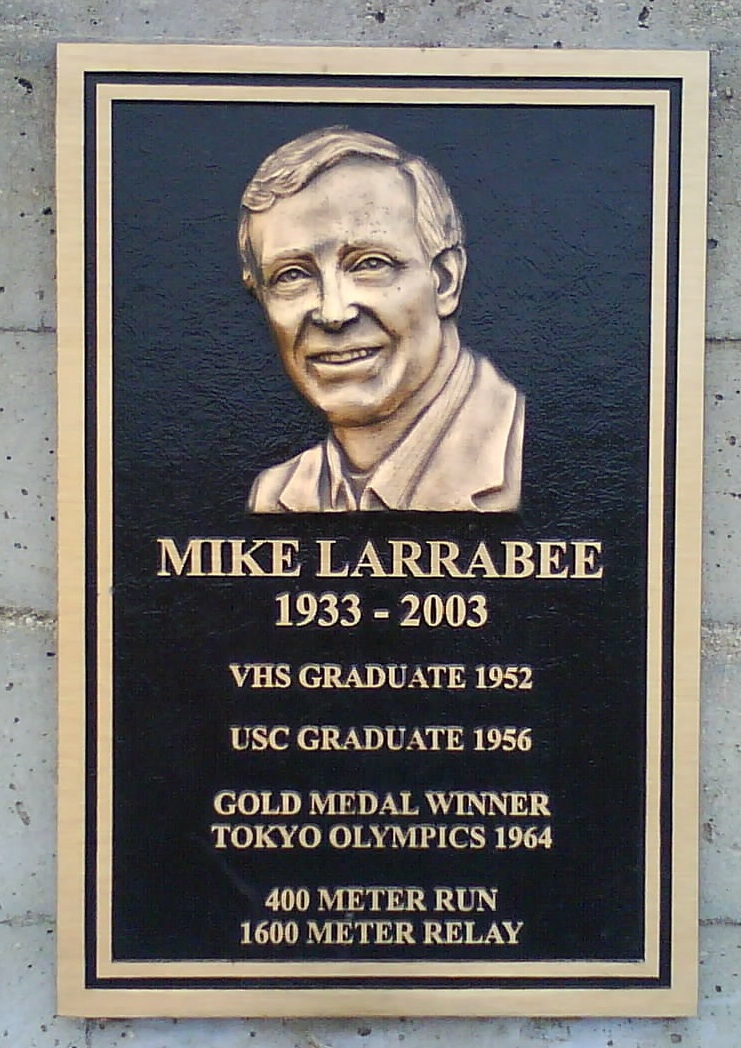
Mike Larrabee plaque at Ventura High School

Although he was diagnosed with advanced pancreatic cancer in 2001 and was only expected to live a few weeks, he continued to live life to the fullest for two more years, thanks to chemotherapy treatments. Mike Larrabee died in his home at Santa Maria, California, aged 69. He was posthumously added to the National Track and Field Hall of Fame in December 2003.

The stadium at Ventura High School, which he attended, is named for him.
