= 1966 European Indoor Games – Men's 400 metres =

The men's 400 metres event at the 1966 European Indoor Games was held on 27 March in Dortmund.

== Medalists ==
| Gold | Silver | Bronze |
|---|---|---|
| Hartmut Koch; East Germany | Manfred Kinder; West Germany | Vasyl Anisimov; Soviet Union |

== Results ==
=== Heats ===
The winner of each heat (Q) and the next 2 fastest (q) qualified for the final.

| Rank | Heat | Name | Nationality | Time | Notes |
|---|---|---|---|---|---|
| 1 | 1 | Manfred Kinder | West Germany | 49.9 | Q |
| 2 | 1 | Miroslav Veruk | Czechoslovakia | 50.2 | |
| 3 | 1 | Willy Vandenwyngaerden | Belgium | 50.4 | |
| 1 | 2 | Hartmut Koch | East Germany | 48.5 | Q |
| 2 | 2 | Nicholas Overhead | Great Britain | 49.0 | q |
| 3 | 2 | Vasyl Anisimov | Soviet Union | 49.2 | q |
| 4 | 2 | Josef Trousil | Czechoslovakia | 49.4 | |
| 5 | 2 | Jean-Louis Descloux | Switzerland | 49.5 | |

=== Final ===
| Rank | Name | Nationality | Time | Notes |
|---|---|---|---|---|
| 1st place, gold medalist(s) | Hartmut Koch | East Germany | 47.9 | |
| 2nd place, silver medalist(s) | Manfred Kinder | West Germany | 48.3 | |
| 3rd place, bronze medalist(s) | Vasyl Anisimov | Soviet Union | 49.0 | |
| 4 | Nicholas Overhead | Great Britain | 49.0 | |
