= Mamadou N'Diaye (athlete) =

Senegalese sprinter

Personal information
- Nationality: Senegalese
- Born: 2 August 1939
- Died: 9 May 2008 (aged 68)

Sport
- Sport: Sprinting
- Event: 4 × 400 metres relay

Mamadou N'Diaye (2 August 1939 – 9 May 2008) was a Senegalese sprinter. He competed in the men's 4 × 400 metres relay at the 1964 Summer Olympics.
