= 1958 European Athletics Championships – Men's 400 metres hurdles =

Hurdling event

Men's 400 metres hurdles at the European Athletics Championships

The men's 400 metres hurdles at the 1958 European Athletics Championships was held in Stockholm, Sweden, at Stockholms Olympiastadion on 20, 21, and 22 August 1958.

== Medalists ==
Gold	Yuriy Lituyev; Soviet Union
Silver	Per-Ove Trollsås; Sweden
Bronze	Bruno Galliker; Switzerland

== Results ==
=== Final ===
22 August

Rank	Name	Nationality	Time	Notes
1st place, gold medalist(s)	Yuriy Lituyev	Soviet Union	51.1	
2nd place, silver medalist(s)	Per-Ove Trollsås	Sweden	51.6	
3rd place, bronze medalist(s)	Bruno Galliker	Switzerland	51.8	NR
4	Tom Farrell	Great Britain	52.0	
5	Anatoliy Yulin	Soviet Union	52.3	
6	Chris Goudge	Great Britain	53.6	

=== Semi-finals ===
21 August

==== Semi-final 1 ====
Rank	Name	Nationality	Time	Notes
1	Yuriy Lituyev	Soviet Union	51.0	Q
2	Bruno Galliker	Switzerland	51.8	NR Q
3	Chris Goudge	Great Britain	52.0	Q
4	Helmut Janz	West Germany	52.5	
5	Janusz Kotliński	Poland	53.2	
6	Moreno Martini	Italy	53.7	

==== Semi-final 2 ====
Rank	Name	Nationality	Time	Notes
1	Per-Ove Trollsås	Sweden	51.0	NR Q
2	Anatoliy Yulin	Soviet Union	51.3	Q
3	Tom Farrell	Great Britain	51.8	Q
4	Sven-Oswald Mildh	Finland	51.8	
5	Hans Dittner	East Germany	53.3	
	Ilie Savel	Romania	DQ	

=== Heats ===
20 August

==== Heat 1 ====
Rank	Name	Nationality	Time	Notes
1	Sven-Oswald Mildh	Finland	52.7	Q
2	Hans Dittner	East Germany	53.0	Q
3	Chris Goudge	Great Britain	53.1	Q
4	Germano Gimelli	Italy	53.3	

==== Heat 2 ====
Rank	Name	Nationality	Time	Notes
1	Anatoliy Yulin	Soviet Union	52.5	Q
2	Per-Ove Trollsås	Sweden	52.8	Q
3	Janusz Kotliński	Poland	53.4	Q
4	Ioannis Kambadellis	Greece	53.6	
5	Jussi Rintamäki	Finland	54.5	

==== Heat 3 ====
Rank	Name	Nationality	Time	Notes
1	Ilie Savel	Romania	52.2	Q
2	Moreno Martini	Italy	52.6	Q
3	Yuriy Lituyev	Soviet Union	53.0	Q
4	Jan Guldbrandsen	Norway	53.6	
5	Emil Weber	Switzerland	54.8	

==== Heat 4 ====
Rank	Name	Nationality	Time	Notes
1	Helmut Janz	West Germany	52.1	Q
2	Tom Farrell	Great Britain	52.5	Q
3	Bruno Galliker	Switzerland	53.0	Q
4	Kai Sjøberg	Norway	53.2	
5	Hans Lindgren	Sweden	53.6	

== Participation ==
According to an unofficial count, 19 athletes from 12 countries participated in the event.

- East Germany (1)
- Finland (2)
- Greece (1)
- Italy (2)
- Norway (2)
- Poland (1)
- Romania (1)
- Soviet Union (2)
- Sweden (2)
- Switzerland (2)
- Great Britain (2)
- West Germany (1)
