= William Hill (Hong Kong athlete) =

Hong Kong sprinter (1945–2020)

Personal information
- Nationality: Hong Konger
- Born: 11 June 1945
- Died: 27 July 2020 (aged 75)

Sport
- Sport: Sprinting
- Events: 200 metres 400 metres

William Hill (11 June 1945 – 27 July 2020) was a Hong Kong sprinter. He competed in the men's 200 and 400 metres at the 1964 Summer Olympics. He was a 1964 graduate of the Diocesan Boys' School.
