= Bernard Martin (environmentalist) =

Canadian fisherman and environmentalist

- Born: 1954 (age 70–71); Petty Harbour, NFLD, Canada
- Occupations: Fisherman; Environmentalist
- Awards: Goldman Prize 1999

Bernard Martin is a Canadian fisherman and environmentalist. He was awarded the Goldman Prize in 1999.

== Early life ==
Martin was born and raised in a fishing family in Petty Harbour, Newfoundland. He continues in his family's traditional cod fishing practices as a fourth-generation fisherman.

== Cod fishing moratorium ==
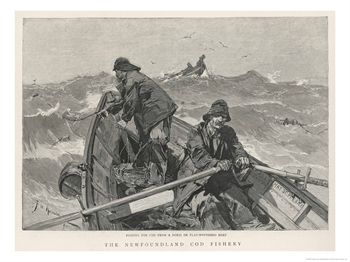
Cod fishing on the Newfoundland Banks

Cod fishing was a way of life in Newfoundland for centuries, but after the Second World War, commercial over-fishing and environmental factors began to take a serious toll, with populations in steep decline. Martin and other inshore fishermen noticed their dwindling catches and alerted government officials to the situation. They hoped that preemptively lowering cod quotas might curb the decline. They went so far as to create a protected fishing zone around Petty Harbour/Maddox Cove and formed a Fishermen’s Cooperative in 1983 to take control over the local industry. However, large-scale, offshore fisheries were much later to acknowledge the slowdown and continued to fish, ultimately leading to the collapse of the industry. Modern fishing equipment like monofilament bottom gill nets are particularly harsh on marine ecosystems. Martin and others continued to advise government officials that this was not sustainable.

In 1992, the Canadian government banned commercial cod fishing in the hopes that the fish populations would increase. After the moratorium on commercial fishing, Martin commented that many still supplemented their diets through recreational fishing, but this too was banned in 1994. Between the loss of income and the need to replace cod's nutritional value with additional grocery items, many in Newfoundland struggled financially. Martin, though aware of the environmental importance of the ban, was nonetheless disappointed by the recreational fishing ban as this forced families and communities to abandon habits spanning generations for a new lifestyle.

== Environmental work and prize ==
Before and after the moratorium, Martin set out to publicise his experience and the mismanagement of the cod industry in the hopes that other marine ecosystems might be better preserved. He shared lessons learned in Alaska, Nicaragua, New Zealand and Eritrea. He also drew analogies between the over-fishing of cod and the logging of old-growth west coast forests. He was arrested near Clayoquot Sound for participating in a blockade against clear-cutting in 1993.

He helped found the Fishers Organized for the Revitalization of Communities and Ecosystems (FORCE) which was supported by the United Nations. He also worked on the Sentinel Survey to study cod stocks and whether the devastation might have been preventable. He acted as coordinator for the Newfoundland and Labrador Oceans Caucus for a year. He has been vocal in criticising the use of drag nets.

Martin was a 1999 Goldman Environmental Prize recipient after being nominated by the Sierra Club of Canada in recognition of his advocacy to save the cod industry from over-fishing and harmful commercial practices like trawling. He intended to use the prize money to repay debts incurred from the ban, to support his four children and to give back to charity. He was glad that the cause could gain credibility through his award.

As of 2012, cod remained scarce and environmentalists recommended that similar measures be taken on the east coast of the United States as well despite possible economic repercussions. While shellfish have been replacing cod as the main market, Canadian fishermen are more careful to remain within recommended catch limits to preserve healthy, sustainable populations. Martin himself transitioned to crab fishing. He is optimistic that the cod stocks are slowly recovering.

== See also ==
- Collapse of the Atlantic northwest cod fishery
- Cod fishing in Newfoundland
