= Bosshardt =

Bosshardt is a surname. Notable people with the surname include:

- Alida Bosshardt (1913–2007), Dutch Salvation Army officer
- Johann Caspar Bosshardt (1823–1887), Swiss history painter
- Nicolas Bosshardt (born 2007), Brazilian footballer
- Rudolf Alfred Bosshardt (1897–1993), British missionary to China with the China Inland Mission

== See also ==
- Bosshard
