= Yoshihiro Amano =

Japanese sprinter

Personal information
- Nationality: Japanese
- Born: 16 October 1942 (age 83)

Sport
- Sport: Sprinting
- Event: 4 × 400 metres relay

Yoshihiro Amano (天野 義裕, Amano Yoshihiro; born 16 October 1942) is a Japanese sprinter. He competed in the men's 4 × 400 metres relay at the 1964 Summer Olympics.
