= Adisorn Vitsudhamakul =

Thai sprinter

Personal information
- Nationality: Thai
- Born: 1 April 1939 (age 87)

Sport
- Sport: Sprinting
- Event: 4 × 400 metres relay

Adisorn Vitsudhamakul (born 1 April 1939) is a Thai sprinter. He competed in the men's 4 × 400 metres relay at the 1964 Summer Olympics.
