= Dick Steane =

British sprinter (1939–2007)

Personal information
- Nationality: British (English)
- Born: 26 September 1939 Isle of Wight, England
- Died: 3 June 2007 (aged 67)
- Height: 184 cm (6 ft 0 in)
- Weight: 72 kg (159 lb)

Sport
- Sport: Athletics
- Event: Sprints
- Club: Thames Valley Harriers
Medal record
Representing Great Britain
Summer Universiade
| Gold medal – first place | 1963 Porto Alegre | 4 × 440m relay |

Richard Swift Steane (26 September 1939 – 3 June 2007) was a British sprinter who competed in the 1968 Summer Olympics.

== Biography ==
Steane won the gold medal in the men's 4 × 400 metres relay at the 1963 Summer Universiade, with Adrian Metcalfe, Menzies Campbell and John Boulter.

Steane finished third behind Menzies Campbell in the 220 yards event at the 1967 AAA Championships and third behind Paul Nash at the 1968 AAA Championships.

At the 1968 Olympic Games in Mexico City, he represented Great Britain in the 200 metres competition.
