= Hans-Ullrich Schulz =

German sprinter

Personal information
- Nationality: German
- Born: 24 May 1939
- Died: 22 August 2012 (aged 73)

Sport
- Sport: Sprinting
- Event: 4 × 400 metres relay

Hans-Ullrich Schulz (24 May 1939 – 22 August 2012) was a German sprinter. He competed in the men's 4 × 400 metres relay at the 1964 Summer Olympics.
