= Daniel Thomas (sprinter) =

Tanzanian sprinter

Personal information
- Nationality: Tanzanian
- Born: 1 January 1937 (age 89)

Sport
- Sport: Sprinting
- Event: 400 metres

Daniel M. Thomas (born 1 January 1937) is a Tanzanian sprinter. He competed in the men's 400 metres at the 1964 Summer Olympics.
