= Daniel Thiaw =

Senegalese sprinter

Personal information
- Nationality: Senegalese
- Born: 14 April 1937
- Died: 24 November 2018 (aged 81)

Sport
- Sport: Sprinting
- Event: 4 × 400 metres relay

Daniel Alexandre Thiaw (14 April 1937 – 24 November 2018) was a Senegalese sprinter. He competed in the men's 4 × 400 metres relay at the 1964 Summer Olympics.
