= Ireneusz Kluczek =

Polish sprinter

Personal information
- Nationality: Polish
- Born: 5 May 1940 Krasnosielc, Poland
- Died: 29 June 2019 (aged 79)
- Height: 1.77 m (5 ft 10 in)
- Weight: 68 kg (150 lb)

Sport
- Sport: Sprinting
- Event: 400 metres
- Club: Gwardia Olsztyn

Ireneusz Kluczek (5 May 1940 – 29 June 2019) was a Polish sprinter. He competed in the men's 400 metres at the 1964 Summer Olympics.

== International competitions ==
Year	Competition	Venue	Position	Event	Notes
Representing Poland
1962	European Championships	Belgrade, Yugoslavia	6th (h)	4 × 400 m relay	3:10.2
1964	Olympic Games	Tokyo, Japan	26th (h)	400 m	47.35^{1}
1964	Olympic Games	Tokyo, Japan	6th	4 × 400 m relay	3:05.3

^{1}Did not start in the quarterfinals

== Personal bests ==
- 100 metres – 10.4h (Olsztyn 1964)
- 200 metres – 21.2h (Olsztyn 1964)
- 400 metres – 46.8h (Warsaw 1962)
