= Hossein Ghafourizadeh =

Iranian sprinter (1943–2022)

Personal information
- Nationality: Iranian
- Born: 16 June 1943 Isfahan, Iran
- Died: 15 May 2022 (aged 78) Tehran, Iran

Sport
- Sport: Sprinting
- Event: 400 metres

Hossein Ghafourizadeh (Persian: حسین غفوری‌زاده; 16 June 1943 – 15 May 2022) was an Iranian sprinter specializing in the 400 metres event. He competed in the men's 400 metres at the 1964 Summer Olympics.
