= Arsenio Jazmin =

Filipino sprinter

Personal information
- Full name: Arsenio Larosa Jazmin
- Nationality: Filipino
- Born: May 25, 1935 (age 91)
- Height: 5 ft 11 in (180 cm)
- Weight: 150 lb (68 kg)

Sport
- Sport: Sprinting
- Event: 400 metres

Arsenio Larosa Jazmin (born May 25, 1935) is a Filipino sprinter. He competed in the men's 400 metres at the 1964 Summer Olympics.
