= Jörg Jüttner =

German sprinter

Personal information
- Nationality: German
- Born: 16 September 1941 (age 84)

Sport
- Sport: Sprinting
- Event: 400 metres

Jörg Jüttner (born 16 September 1941) is a German sprinter. He competed in the men's 400 metres at the 1964 Summer Olympics.
