= Ken Wilcock =

English sprinter (1934–2025)

Medal record

Men's athletics

Representing Great Britain

European Championships
Silver medal – second place	1962 Belgrade	4×400 m

Kenneth J. Wilcock (28 December 1934 – December 2025) was a British sprinter.

== Biography ==
Wilcock was born in Lancashire, England on 28 December 1934. At the 1962 European Athletics Championships in Belgrade, he won silver with the British team in the 4 x 400 metres relay.

His personal best in the 440 yards was 47.2 seconds (46.8 seconds in the 400 metres) on 21 July 1962 in St Helens.

Wilcock died in late December 2025, at the age of 91.
