= Muhammad Sadiq (sprinter) =

Pakistani sprinter (born 1938)

Personal information
- Nationality: Pakistani
- Born: 29 September 1938 (age 87)

Sport
- Sport: Sprinting
- Event: 400 metres

Muhammad Sadiq (born 29 September 1938) is a Pakistani sprinter. He competed in the men's 400 metres at the 1964 Summer Olympics.

Sadiq won the gold medal in the 400 m at the 1963 Pakistani Athletics Championships, running 49.0 seconds. He then won the silver medal at the 1964 edition before following that up with a bronze at the 1965 Championships.

In the 1964 Olympic 400 m, Sadiq placed 6th in his heat, running 47.3 to advance to the quarter-finals. He only ran 48.0 in his next race and did not advance to the semi-finals.
