= Karl-Uno Olofsson =

Swedish middle-distance runner

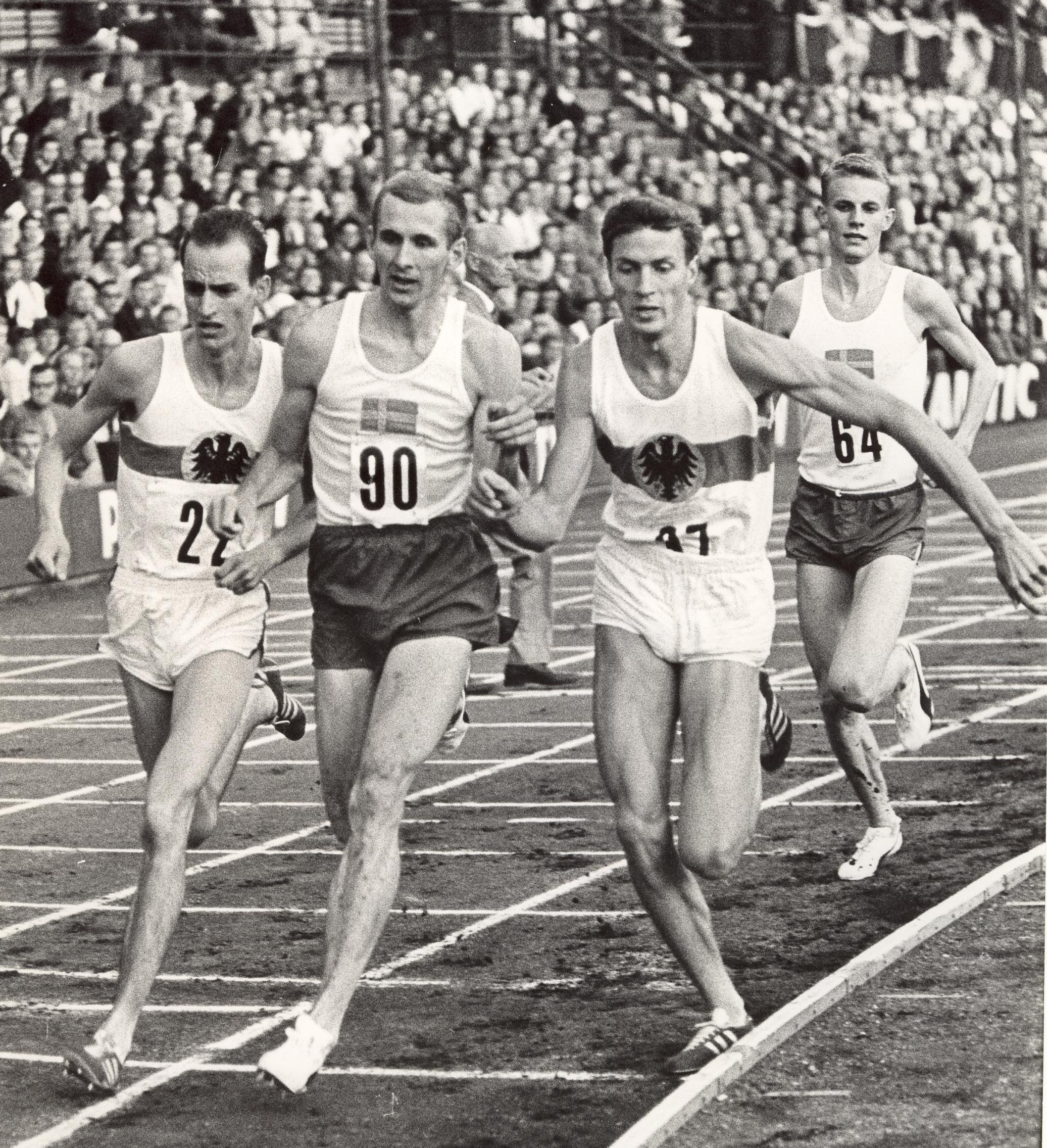
- Olofsson flanked by Harald Norpoth and Bodo Tümmler in 1964

Personal information
- Born: 16 December 1940 (age 85) Vindeln, Sweden
- Height: 1.87 m (6 ft 2 in)
- Weight: 76 kg (168 lb)

Sport
- Sport: Athletics
- Events: 800 m, 1500 m
- Club: FIF Burälven; IFK Umeå

Achievements and titles
- Personal bests: 800 m – 1:47.9; 1500 m – 3:41.8 (1965)

Karl-Uno Olofsson (born 16 December 1940) is a retired Swedish middle-distance runner. He competed in 1500 m event at the 1964 Summer Olympics, where he reached the semifinals. Olofsson became Nordic champion in the 1500 m (1965) and won the Swedish titles in the 800 m (1965), 1500 m (1963–65) and 4 × 1500 m relay (1965–67).
