= Izabela Filipiak =

Polish writer (born 1961)

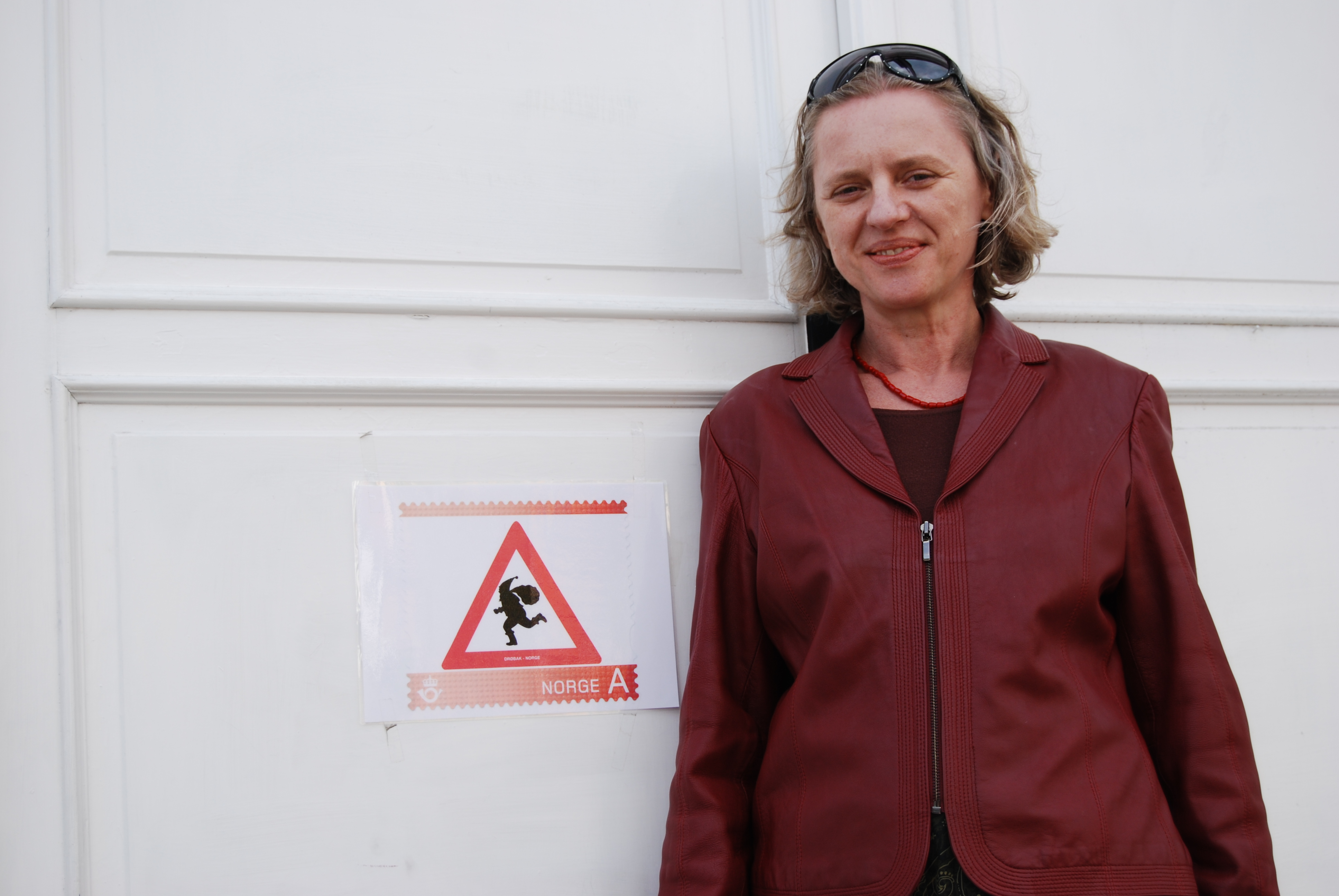
Izabela Filipiak, 2008

Izabela Filipiak (born 1961 in Gdynia) is a Polish writer, an essayist, a columnist, and a scholar.

== Biography ==
She debuted in the beginning of the 90s as one of the most distinct figures of Polish literary life. In her short stories and essays, she promoted the new literature in democratic Poland as open to voices previously excluded from cultural discourse. Her novel Absolutna Amnezja published in 1995, critiques the communist past from the point of view of socially maladjusted young women. The book mixes satirical representation of authoritarian schools and dysfunctional families with historical events from the pre-Solidarity period and discusses education as breaking the girls' spirits through an elaborate application of double standards. When the critics attacked the novel, Maria Janion, the renowned literary historian, came to its rescue, thus launching the major debate about the absence of feminism in the Polish cultural tradition.

Starting in the late 90s, Filipiak was teaching creative writing classes at the gender studies department of Warsaw University and in the College of Arts at Letters at Jagiellonian University in Kraków. She published a creative writing handbook, Tworcze Pisanie dla Mlodych Panien, which she addressed mainly to women writers and men inspired to embrace their inner fem. She wrote an introduction to the first translation of Virginia Woolf's A Room of One's Own. In 1997, she came out as a gay in the Polish edition of Cosmopolitan and on national TV. She claimed that coming out improved both her personal life and her career, as she began to write columns for top shelf magazines. Starting in 2000, her tone became more critical, and she began to comment on the rise of populism and homophobia in Poland. These columns were eventually published in the collection Kultura Obrazonych, but by 2003 Filipiak lost all her press assignments. She connects this turn of events with the mobilization of the Christian right as Poland entered the European Union.

In 2003 Filipiak left for the University of California at Berkeley for an appointment as a visiting scholar at the Institute of Slavic, East European, Eurasian Studies, and an affiliated scholar at the Beatrice M. Bain Research Group. In 2005, supported by her mentor Maria Janion, she received her PhD from the Polish Academy of Sciences in Warsaw, but her thesis about political and artistic applications of transgender figures in East European modernism was considered subversive by established scholars. Between 2002 and 2006, Filipiak published a volume of poetry (Madame Intuita), a play (The Book of Em) based on the life of Maria Komornicka, a haunted figure of Polish modernism, and Absolutna Amnezja went through a third printing. Still excluded by the mainstream, the writer decided to stay in the U.S. In 2009, she received an MFA in fiction from Mills College in California, then returned to Poland upon accepting a position in the American Studies Department at Gdańsk University.

Since 2010, Filipiak has been the president of Writers for Peace Foundation whose goals are supporting minority voices and maintaining a network of artists concerned with issues of marginalized groups. In the fall of 2010, Writers for Peace confronted SKM, the local commuter train, regarding the lack of accessibility.

Filipiak specializes in the subject of exclusion, displacement, grief (and the lack of formulas for its public expression for gay people), documenting styles of radical resistance to social and cultural exclusion, irony and black humor, debt, war and privatization.

== Works Published ==
- Śmierć i spirala short stories Wrocław: A, 1992, ISBN 83-900598-2-7
- Absolutna amnezja novel (1st edition Poznań: Obserwator, 1995, ISBN 83-901720-9-7; 2nd edition Warszawa: PIW, 1998, ISBN 83-06-02663-2; 3rd edition Warszawa: tCHu, 2006, ISBN 83-89782-14-6)
- Niebieska menażeria memoir (Warszawa: Sick!, 1997 ISBN 83-86056-26-6
- Twórcze pisanie dla młodych panien essays on creative writing Warszawa: W.A.B, 1999, ISBN 83-88221-05-1
- Madame Intuita poetry (1st edition Warszawa: Nowy Świat, 2002, ISBN 83-88576-81-X; 2nd edition, including trans. by Alessandro Amenta, Salerno: Heimat Edizioni ISBN 978-88-95108-03-2
- Kultura obrażonych political; non-fiction (Warszawa: W.A.B, 2003, ISBN 83-89291-20-7
- Alma novel (Kraków: Wydawnictwo Literackie, 2003, ISBN 83-08-03486-1
- Księga Em play (Warszawa: tCHu, 2005, ISBN 83-89782-12-X
- Magiczne oko. Opowiadania zebrane selected stories (Warszawa: W.A.B. 2006, ISBN 83-7414-237-5, ISBN 978-83-7414-237-3
- Obszary odmienności. Rzecz o Marii Komornickiej gender studies; modernism, non-fiction (Warszawa: tCHu, 2005, ISBN 83-89782-12-X
