= Cod fishing in Newfoundland =

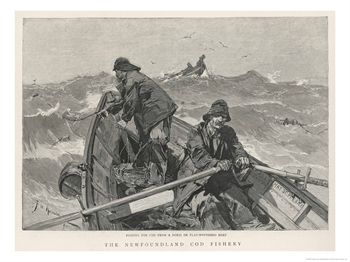
Cod fishing on the Newfoundland Banks

Cod fishing in Newfoundland was carried out at a subsistence level for centuries, but large scale fishing began shortly after the European arrival in the North American continent in 1492, with the waters being found to be preternaturally plentiful, and ended after intense overfishing with the collapse of the fisheries in 1992.

== Native Canadian fishing ==
The Beothuk (called Skrælings by the Vikings) were the indigenous people of Newfoundland. The meat portions of their diet was caribou, marine mammals and fish. With the arrival of British and French coastal settlements, the Beothuk were forced inland, and the lack of their normal food source contributed to a decrease in the Beothuk population. Beothuk numbers began to dwindle rapidly due to a combination of factors directly relating to European colonization of the Americas, Inuit and Mi'kmaq migration, and by the 19th Century, the tribe no longer existed.

== 15th and 16th centuries ==
After his voyage in 1497, John Cabot's crew reported that "the sea there is full of fish that can be taken not only with nets but with fishing-baskets" and around 1600 English fishing captains still reported cod shoals "so thick by the shore that we hardly have been able to row a boat through them."

In the early sixteenth century, fishermen from England, France, Spain and Portugal learned the best places to fish for cod in the waters off Newfoundland, and how best to preserve the fish for the journey home.

The French, Spanish and Portuguese fishermen tended to fish on the Grand Banks and other banks out to sea, where fish were always available. They salted their fish on board ship and it was not dried until brought to Europe. The English fishermen, however, concentrated on fishing inshore where the fish were only to be found at certain times of the year when the fish migrated. These fishermen used small boats and returned to shore every day. They developed a system of light salting, washing and drying onshore, which became very popular because the fish could remain edible for years. Many of their coastal sites gradually developed into settlements, notably St. John's, now the provincial capital.

In 1585 the Portuguese fishing fleet was raided by the English, who were at war with Portugal as it was part of the Kingdom of Spain. Sir John Hawkins devised the raid as a way to rob Portugal and Spain of experienced mariners, and capture ships. Led by Sir Bernard Drake, the raid was a disaster for the Portuguese, who did not send a fishing fleet the year after. In the late sixteenth century the Spanish and Portuguese fisheries were terminated, mainly as a result of the failure of the Spanish Armada, and thereafter the English and French shared the fishery every summer until 1904 when the French agreed to relinquish it to the Newfoundland residents.

Together with the cod industry of New England, Newfoundland's exported salt cod was instrumental in providing the cheap (low-quality) high-protein food necessary to sustain slavery in the Caribbean. The role of Newfoundland became particularly important following the American War of Independence when New England's traders lost access to British colonies, leading to a famine among slaves between 1780 and 1787. Historian Mark Kurlansky notes that eventually, "Nova Scotia and Newfoundland took up the slack, and their fisheries too became largely geared for low-grade West India saltfish."

== 20th century fishing methods and the fishery collapse ==
In 1904 the British and French governments signed the Entente Cordiale which, among many other matters, extinguished French claims to Newfoundland in exchange for the Îles de Los off West Africa.

In 1951 factory fishing began with new super-trawlers such as the 'Fairtry'; 280 feet long and 2,600 gross tons.

The cod catch peaked in 1968 at 810,000 tons, approximately three times more than the maximum yearly catch achieved before the super-trawlers. Approximately eight million tons of cod were caught between 1647 and 1750, a period encompassing 25 to 40 cod generations. The factory trawlers took the same amount in 15 years.

The industry collapsed entirely in the early 1990s owing to overfishing and debatably, greed, lack of foresight and poor local administration. By 1993 six cod populations had collapsed, forcing a belated moratorium on fishing. Spawning biomass had decreased by at least 75% in all stocks, by 90% in three of the six stocks, and by 99% in the case of 'northern' cod, previously the largest cod fishery in the world.

After a 10-year moratorium on fishing begun in 1992, the cod had still not returned. It was thought that the local ecosystem might have changed, one possibility being that greater numbers of capelin, which used to provide food for the cod, might be eating the juvenile cod. The waters appeared to be dominated by crab and shrimp rather than fish. However, by 2011 it became apparent that the fisheries were returning to their original abundance, just more slowly than had been anticipated.

In 2024, the Canadian government lifted the fishing ban for cod off the north and east coasts of Newfoundland and Labrador. It allowed commercial fishing for the first time since 1992 and set the total allowable catch at 18,000 tons.

== Comprehensive Economic and Trade Agreement ==
The Comprehensive Economic and Trade Agreement (CETA) between Canada and the European Union is a Free Trade Agreement which is still under negotiation as of May 2015. The provincial government has argued that the Federal government of Canada in Ottawa reneged on a deal to pay $280 million in exchange for its relinquishment of minimum processing requirements as part of CETA. Those rules helped protect jobs in fish plants, especially in rural areas hit hard by the cod moratorium since 1992.

== See also ==
- Cod fisheries
- Collapse of the Atlantic northwest cod fishery
