= Marian Filipiuk =

Polish sprinter

Personal information
- Nationality: Polish
- Born: 2 February 1941 (age 85) Radzyń Podlaski, Poland
- Height: 1.78 m (5 ft 10 in)
- Weight: 70 kg (154 lb)

Sport
- Sport: Sprinting
- Event: 400 metres
- Club: Lumel Zielona Góra; Śląsk Wrocław

Marian Filipiuk (born 2 February 1941) is a retired Polish sprinter. He competed in the men's 4 × 400 metres relay at the 1964 Summer Olympics.

== International competitions ==
Year	Competition	Venue	Position	Event	Notes
Representing Poland
1964	Olympic Games	Tokyo, Japan	6th	4 × 400 m relay	3:05.3
1965	Universiade	Budapest, Hungary	12th (sf)	400 m	48.8
1965	Universiade	Budapest, Hungary	– (h)	4 × 400 m relay	DQ

== Personal bests ==
- 100 metres – 10.4h (Zielona Góra 1964)
- 200 metres – 21.1h (Sofia 1964)
- 400 metres – 47.1h (Oslo 1964)
