= Hansjörg Bosshard =

Swiss sprinter

Personal information
- Nationality: Swiss
- Born: 1 February 1940 (age 86)

Sport
- Sport: Sprinting
- Event: 4 × 400 metres relay

Hansjörg Bosshard (born 1 February 1940) is a Swiss sprinter. He competed in the men's 4 × 400 metres relay at the 1964 Summer Olympics.
