= John Boulter (athlete) =

British middle-distance runner (born 1940)

Personal information
- Nationality: British (English)
- Born: 18 November 1940 (age 85) Colchester, England
- Height: 185 cm (6 ft 1 in)
- Weight: 68 kg (150 lb)

Sport
- Sport: Middle-distance running
- Event: 800 metres
- Club: Bolton Harriers; Oxford University AC; Achilles Club
Medal record
Representing Great Britain
Summer Universiade
Gold medal – first place	1963 Porto Alegre	4 × 440m relay

John Peter Boulter (born 18 November 1940) is a British middle-distance runner who competed at two Olympic Games.

== Biography ==
Boulter was educated at The Queen's College, Oxford and University of Bristol. He won the gold medal in the men's 4 × 400 metres relay at the 1963 Summer Universiade with Adrian Metcalfe, Menzies Campbell and Dick Steane.

At the 1964 Olympic Games in Tokyo, he represented Great Britain in the men's 800 metres competition. Boulter won his heat but was eliminated at the semi final stage. He missed out on qualification to the final by 0.1 seconds after finishing 4th in his semi final in a time of 1:47.1

Boulter finished second behind Tom Farrell in the 880 yards event at the 1965 AAA Championships and third behind Noel Carroll at the 1966 AAA Championships.

He represented the England team at the 1966 British Empire and Commonwealth Games in Kingston, Jamaica, in the 880 yards and the 1 mile event.

Boulter became the British 880 yards champion after winning the British AAA Championships title at the 1967 AAA Championships.

After his athletics career, Boulter became a language teacher, working in Colchester and Cheltenham.
