= Daour M'baye Guèye =

Senegalese sprinter

Personal information
- Nationality: Senegalese
- Born: 29 May 1937 (age 88)

Sport
- Sport: Sprinting
- Event: 4 × 400 metres relay

Daour M'baye Guèye (born 29 May 1937) is a Senegalese sprinter. He competed in the 4 × 400 metres relay at the 1964 Summer Olympics and the 1968 Summer Olympics.
