= Fritz Roth =

Swiss wrestler

- Born: 1900
- Died: 1979 (aged 78–79)

Fritz Roth was a Swiss wrestler. He competed in the freestyle light heavyweight event at the 1924 Summer Olympics.
