= Germain Nelzy =

French sprinter

Germain Nelzy (3 August 1934 – 15 December 2012) was a French athlete who specialised in the 4 x 400 meter relay. Nelzy competed at the 1964 Summer Olympics. He was born in Case-Pilote, Martinique.
