= Peter Vassella =

Australian sprinter

Peter Francis Vassella (4 January 1941 – 15 October 2024) was an Australian sprinter who competed in the 1964 Summer Olympics. He was previously married to another Australian Olympic Sprinter, Marilyn Black.
