= Gian Paolo Iraldo =

Italian sprinter

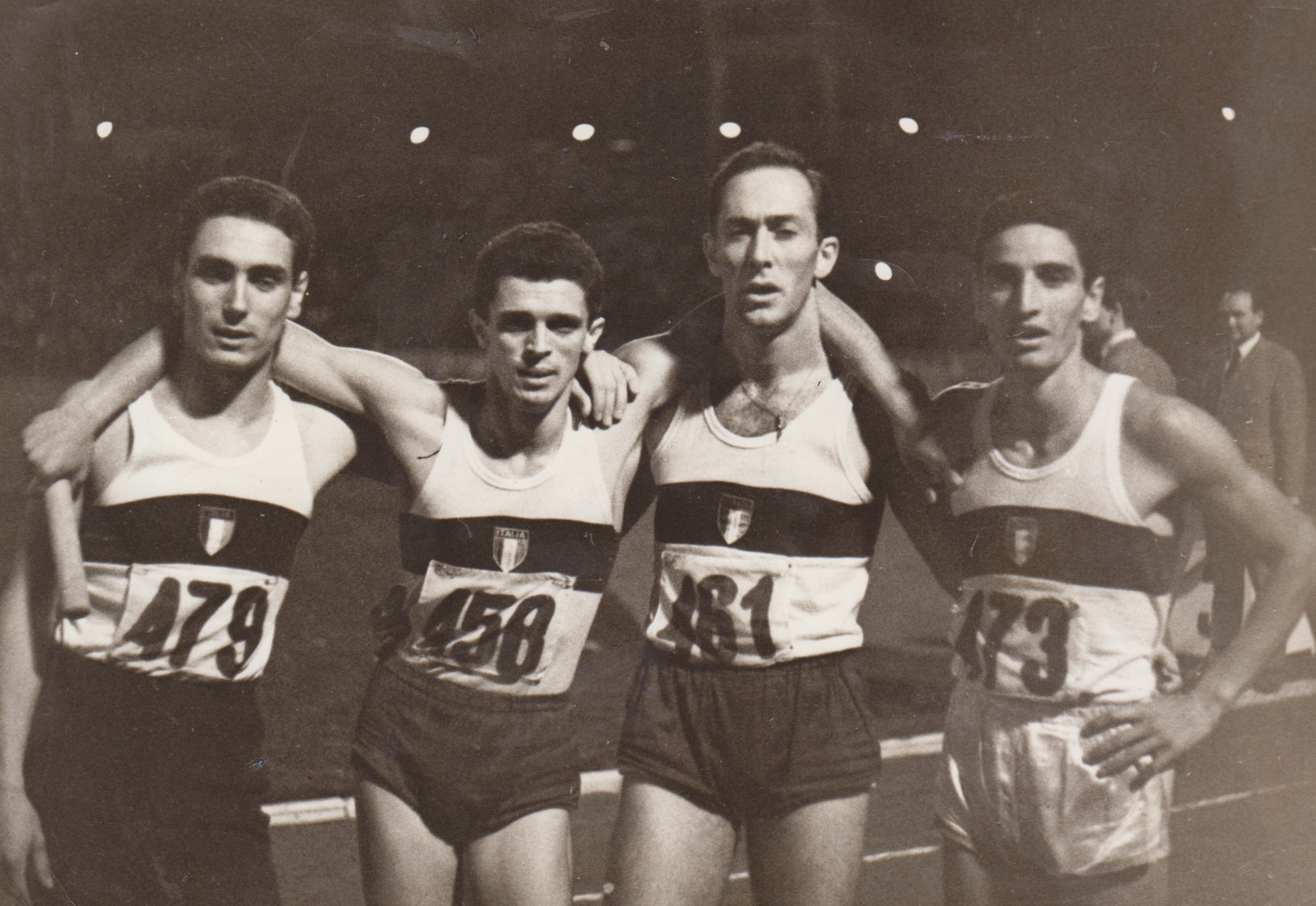

Personal information
- National team: Italy
- Born: 2 June 1943 Cuneo, Italy
- Died: 17 August 2009 (aged 66) Cuneo, Italy

Sport
- Sport: Athletics
- Event: Sprint

Achievements and titles
- Personal best: 400 m: 47.4 (1965)
Medal record
Summer Universiade
| Gold medal – first place | 1965 Budapest | 4x400 metres relay |

Gian Paolo Iraldo (2 June 1943 - 17 August 2009) was an Italian sprinter, mainly specialized in 400 metres.

== Biography ==
He won one medals at the International athletics competitions with the national relay team. He has 10 caps in national team from 1962 to 1963. He died at the age of 66 in a car accident in his native Cuneo.

== See also ==
- Italy national relay team
