= Bernard Martin (athlete) =

French sprinter

Personal information
- Born: 19 February 1943 (age 83)
- Height: 182 cm (6 ft 0 in)
- Weight: 75 kg (165 lb)

Sport
- Country: France
- Sport: Athletics (sprint)
- Event: 4 × 400 metres relay
- Club: Union Sportive Melun

Achievements and titles
- Personal best: 400 – 46.9 (1968)

Bernard Martin (born 19 February 1943) is a French sprinter. He competed in the men's 4 × 400 metres relay at the 1964 Summer Olympics.
