= Walter Bosshard (photojournalist) =

Swiss photographer (1892–1975)

- Born: 8 November 1892; Samstagern, Switzerland
- Died: 18 November 1975 (aged 83); Ronda, Spain
- Occupation: Photographer

Walter Bosshard (1892–1975) was a Swiss photographer and reporter. He was instrumental in shaping the style of illustrated magazines that became popular at the end of the 1920s and is considered a pioneer of modern photojournalism.

== Life ==
Bosshard studied pedagogy and art history in Zurich and Florence and trained as a primary school teacher at the Kantonsschule Küsnacht. From 1911 to 1913 he was active in the field. From 1914 to 1918 he worked as a teacher in Feldmeilen. Photography was initially only his hobby, he was self-taught.

In 1919 Bosshard gave up teaching and went to Sumatra to work as an administrator on a plantation and then as a gemstone dealer in the Far East. In 1927/28 he participated as a technician in the German Central Asia expedition to Kashmir and Xinjiang, led by Emil Trinkler. His first photo reportage was created from the photographs he took during this time. His exotic pictures from faraway countries were highly sought after and he received commissions from various magazines, such as the Berliner Illustrirten Zeitung and the Münchner Illustrierte Presse.

In 1929 Mohammed Nadir was crowned as the new King of Afghanistan. Only three foreign journalists were admitted to the enthronement and the festivities: the American William L. Shirer, the Austrian Harald Lechenperg and Walter Bosshard. In 1930, he was sent to India by the German Photographic Service (Dephot), where he succeeded in producing a highly acclaimed series of photographs from the private life of Mahatma Gandhi, who otherwise shied away from publicity. He then reported from Siam, Cambodia, the Shan States, the Upper Mekong Valley, French Laos and Annam. In 1931 he was in Nanjing, where he was able to record a meeting with Marshal Chiang Kai-shek and presented a photo reportage about Mao Zedong, which was again highly regarded. In the same year he made a photo report for the Berliner Illustrirte Zeitung about the polar flight of the airship Graf Zeppelin. In 1932 he also travelled to Singapore, Bangkok, the Philippines and Japan. In 1933 he documented the Manchurian crisis, reported from Shanghai and took part in a German geographic Kokonor expedition. Afterwards he was a correspondent in Beijing until 1939, where he mainly worked for the American agency Black Star. In March 1934 he experienced the coronation of Puyi as emperor in Manchukuo, from 1934 to 1936 further journeys through China followed, among others to Inner Mongolia.

In 1939 he became foreign correspondent for the Neue Zürcher Zeitung (NZZ) and worked increasingly as a reporter rather than as a photographer. As of 1940, he was a correspondent for Life. He was a war correspondent in Poland, Greece, Iraq and Iran; from 1942 to 1945 he was stationed in Washington and was an observer at the San Francisco Conference, the Yalta Conference and the beginnings of the United Nations. From 1946 to 1949 he went again to Beijing, where he had to flee from the invasion of the communists and lost a large number of his photographic works during his escape. From 1949 to 1953 he worked as a correspondent in the Middle East.

An accident in Korea in 1953 - he tripped over a tree root and suffered a complicated hip fracture - ended his professional career. He withdrew into private life and lived in Torremolinos and Ronda in Spain until his death, where he died shortly after his 83rd birthday.

== Portfolio ==
Paul Hofer, Bosshard's godchild and heir, bequeathed the written legacy to the Archive for Contemporary History (AfZ) of ETH Zurich. The holdings comprise diary-like notes and collections of articles, including almost all of the NZZ reports from 1939 to 1956, as well as documents and manuscripts relating to his books, supplemented by 20,000 positives and negatives, slides, glass plates, large albums and films. The Fotostiftung Schweiz, which owns the majority of the collection of negatives and supplementary materials, carried out a project co-financed by the Swiss National Science Foundation together with the AfZ, the result of which was a complete inventory of both holdings, a book publication and, in 1997/98, an exhibition in the Kunsthaus Zürich on Boshard's work.

== Publications ==
- Durch Tibet und Turkestan. 1930.
- Indien kämpft! 1931.
- Erlebte Weltgeschichte. Reisen und Begegnungen eines neutralen Berichterstatters im Weltkrieg 1939-1945. Mit 44 Aufnahmen., Fretz und Wasmuth 1947.
- Kühles Grasland Mongolei, Büchergilde Gutenberg 1952.
- Gefahrenherd der Welt, Büchergilde Gutenberg 1954.
- Generäle, Könige, Rebellen. 1954.
- Thut, Geschichte aus dem Sudan, Fretz & Wasmuth 1960.
- Im goldenen Sand von Asswan, Orell Füssli 1962.

== Photo material ==
Boshard's estate at the Fotostiftung Schweiz in Winterthur contains extensive photographic material on his travels and photo reportages, including

- Plantation work and gemstone trade in the Far East 1919–1925,
- Expeditions 1926-1932 Kashmir, Central Asia, India, Afghanistan, Siam, Kama, Shan States, Upper Mekong Valley, French Laos, Annam, Japan-China War 1931/32,
- Singapore, Bangkok, Philippines, Japan; stay in China 1933–1939
- German Koko-Nor expedition, imperial coronation, travels in Rehe and Mongolia, hunting in Manchuria, Yangtze, Chinese-Japanese war 1937,
- Yenan, Siam, fight for Hankou; World War II (war reporting, USA) 1938–1944
- Post-war period 1945–1956

== Films ==
- Peking, 1934
- Freunde in Peking, 1934
- Kaiserkrönung in Hsinking, 1934
- Mandschurei, Nr. 1, ca. 1935
- Mongolei, Teil I und II, ca. 1936
- Allerlei aus China, 1936
- Von Tientsin nach Shanghai, 1937
- Siam I, 1938
- Siam-Lobpburi, s. d.
- Evacuation Children, 1938
- Yenan, Teil I und II, 1938
- Weltausstellung in New York, 1939
- Pazifik-Kanada, 1939
- Plymouth-Rom, s. d.
- USA-Kanada 1943-1944. Von Washington nach Williamsburg – Tropfsteinhöhlen in Kanada, 1944
- Peking 1947, 1. August-Feier, Privates, 1947
- Peking: Tore, Strasse, Tempel, Zauberer, Opium, Verbotene Stadt, ca. 1954
- Grosse Mauer, Shanghai, Pagode der Macht in Lungwa, s. d.
