= Masami Yoshida (sprinter) =

Japanese sprinter

Personal information
- Nationality: Japanese
- Born: 17 January 1946 (age 80)

Sport
- Sport: Sprinting
- Event: 4 × 400 metres relay
Medal record
Representing Japan
Asian Games
Gold medal – first place	1966 Bangkok	4x400m relay
Bronze medal – third place	1966 Bangkok	400m

Masami Yoshida (吉田 正美, Yoshida Masami; born 17 January 1946) is a Japanese sprinter. He competed in the men's 4 × 400 metres relay at the 1964 Summer Olympics.
