= Hans-Joachim Reske =

German sprinter (born 1940)

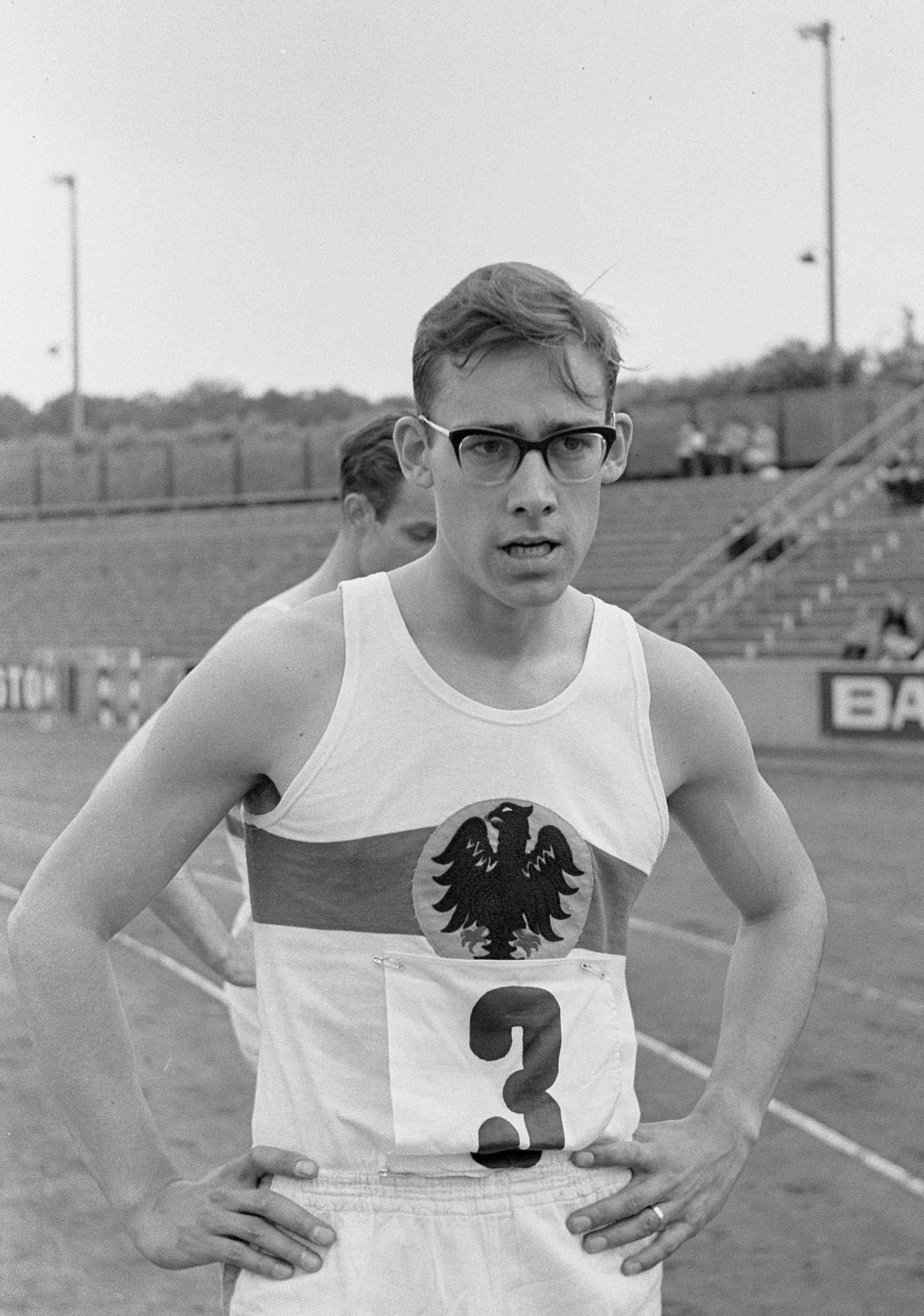
- Hans-Joachim Reske in 1963

Personal information
- Born: 9 April 1940 (age 86) Bartenstein, Germany (present-day Bartoszyce, Poland)
- Height: 1.84 m (6 ft 0 in)
- Weight: 80 kg (176 lb)

Sport
- Sport: Sprint running
- Club: SV Saar 05, Saarbrücken
Medal record
Men's athletics
Representing Germany
Olympic Games
Silver medal – second place	1960 Rome	4×400 m
Representing West Germany
European Championships
Gold medal – first place	1962 Belgrade	4×400 m
Bronze medal – third place	1962 Belgrade	400 m
Summer Universiade
Silver medal – second place	1963 Porto Alegre	400m
Silver medal – second place	1963 Porto Alegre	4x400m relay

Hans-Joachim "Jochen" Reske (born 9 April 1940) is a West German former track and field athlete, who mainly competed in the 400 metres. He won a silver medal at the 1960 Summer Olympics, and in 1962, at the European championships, he finished in third place in the individual 400 m and his team won the 4 × 400 metre relay.
