= Hans-Olof Johansson =

Swedish sprinter (1936–2022)

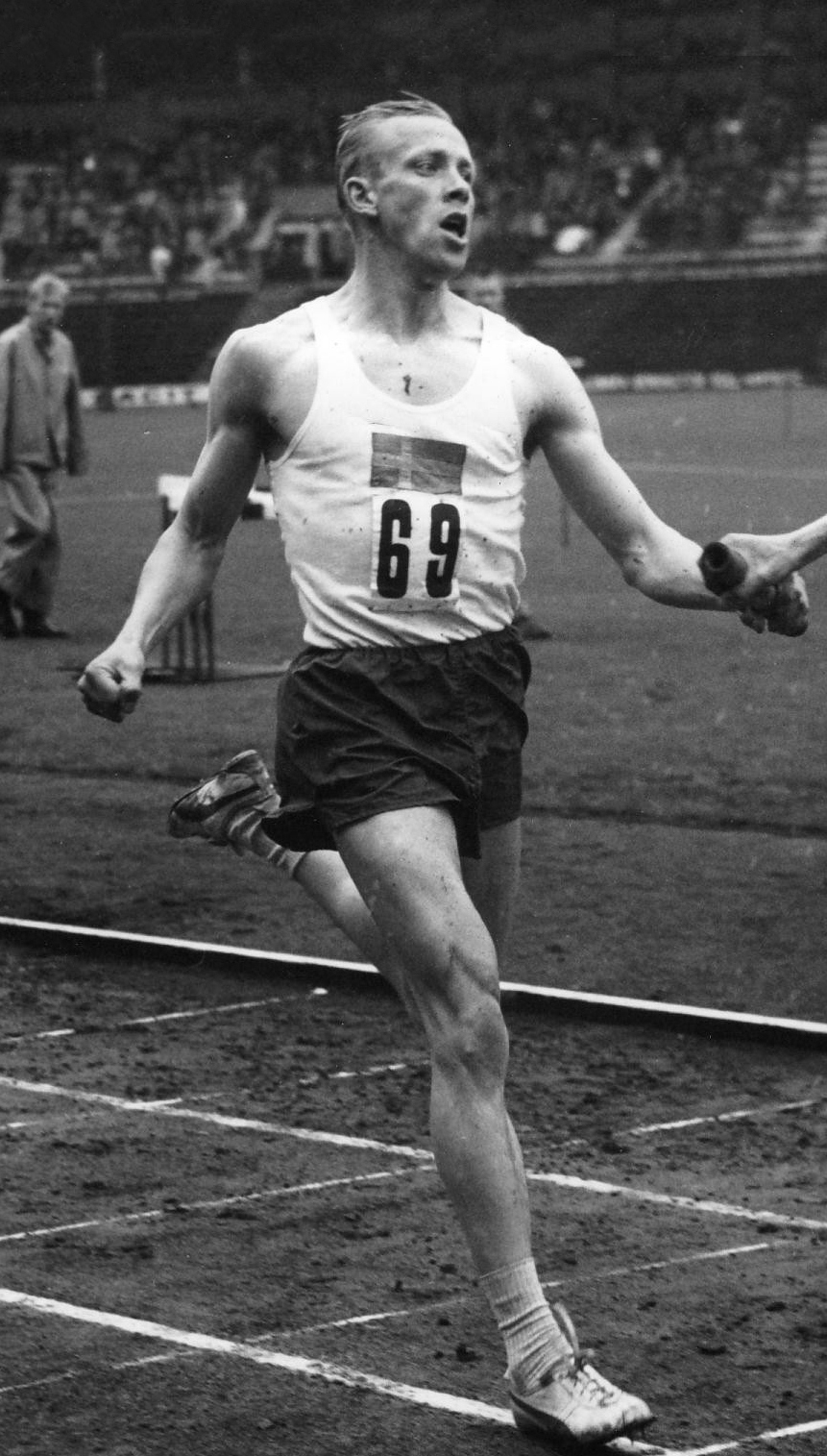
- Hans-Olof Johansson in 1962

Personal information
- Born: 18 March 1936 Sköldinge, Sweden
- Died: 18 February 2022 (aged 85)
- Height: 1.76 m (5 ft 9 in)
- Weight: 70 kg (150 lb)

Sport
- Sport: Athletics
- Event: 400 m
- Club: Nyköpings SK

Achievements and titles
- Personal best: 400 m – 46.7 (1962)

Hans-Olof Harald Johansson (18 March 1936 – 18 February 2022) was a Swedish sprinter. He competed in the 4 × 400 m relay at the 1960 Summer Olympics and 1962 European Athletics Championships and finished fourth in 1962. He won the national 400 m title in 1961, and set a new national record in this event, in a semifinal of the 1962 European Championships.
