= Bo Althoff =

Swedish sprinter (1944–2022)

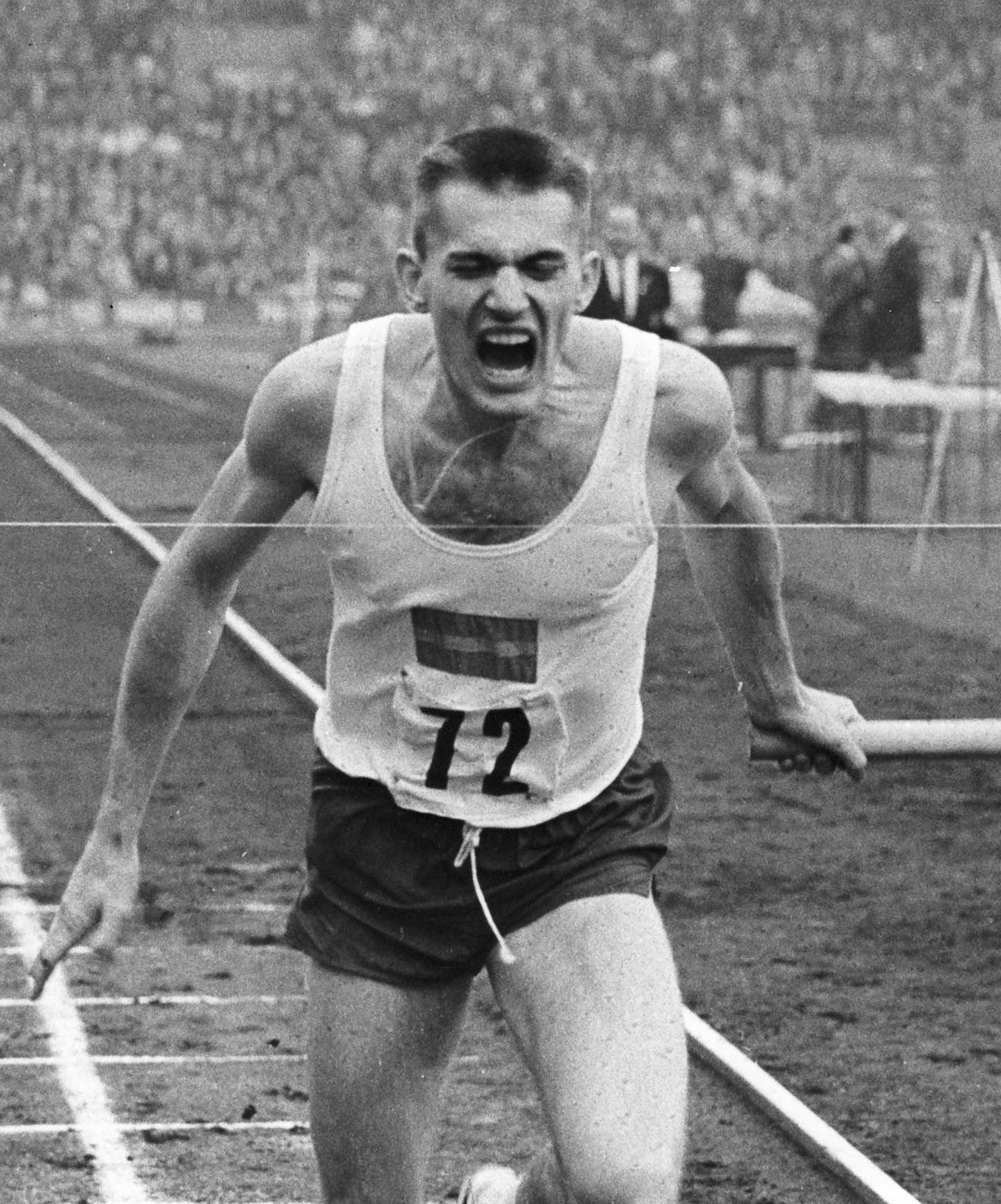

Personal information
- Born: 17 September 1944 Mellerud, Sweden
- Died: 27 October 2022 (aged 78) Örebro, Sweden

Sport
- Sport: Athletics
- Event: 100–400 m
- Club: Melleruds IF

Achievements and titles
- Personal best(s): 100 m – 10.5; 200 m – 21.4; 400 m – 47.2

Bo Althoff (17 September 1944 – 27 October 2022) is a retired Swedish sprinter. He was part of the 4 × 400 m relay team that finished fourth at the 1962 European Championships, setting a new national record, and missing a bronze medal by 0.7 seconds. He won the national titles in the 100 m (1965), 200 m (1964 and 1966), 400 m (1964–67) and 4 × 400 m relay (1967).
