= Robbie Brightwell =

British athlete (1939–2022)

Robbie Brightwell MBE
Personal information
- Born: 27 October 1939 Rawalpindi, British Raj
- Died: 6 March 2022 (aged 82) Congleton, England
- Height: 188 cm (6 ft 2 in)
- Weight: 81 kg (179 lb)

Sport
- Sport: Athletics
- Event: Sprints/400 metres
- Club: Birchfield Harriers
Medal record
Men's athletics
Representing Great Britain
Olympic Games
Silver medal – second place	1964 Tokyo	4×400 m
European Championships
Gold medal – first place	1962 Belgrade	400 m
Silver medal – second place	1962 Belgrade	4×400 m
Representing England
Commonwealth Games
Silver medal – second place	1962 Perth	440 yd
Silver medal – second place	1962 Perth	4×440 yd

Robert Ian Brightwell MBE (27 October 1939 – 6 March 2022) was a British track and field athlete and silver medallist.

== Biography ==
Brightwell was born in Rawalpindi, British Raj (now part of Pakistan), but moved to the United Kingdom with his family in 1946 and grew up in Donnington, Telford, Shropshire. He was educated at Trench Secondary Modern School where he became head boy and set a number of school running records, and he played as goalkeeper in the local Donnington Swifts football team. He gained his athletic training at Shrewsbury Technical College and went on to become a sportsmaster at Tiffin Boys' School in Surrey, England.

He came to prominence as a 400 m runner, and broke the British record for both 440 yards and 400 metres as well as the European 400 metres record. He narrowly failed to reach the final of the individual 400 metres at the 1960 Olympic Games in Rome, finishing 4th in his semi-final in a hand-timed 46.1. He also ran the anchor leg in the men's 4 × 400 Relay, where the Great Britain team finished 5th in the final.

Brightwell represented the England team at the 1962 British Empire and Commonwealth Games in Perth, Western Australia, where he won double silver in the 440 yards and 4 × 440 yd relay events.

During the 1964 Olympics held in Tokyo, he was captain of the men's British Olympic Team. Running the final stage in the men's 4 × 400 metres relay, he passed Wendell Mottley of Trinidad and Tobago to finish second to Henry Carr of the US. In the individual 400 metres he finished fourth.

His fiancée at that time was Ann Packer who won a gold medal in the women's 800 metres (run) on the day after the men's individual 400 metres final. After winning a silver medal in the 400 metres Packer had no plans to run in the 800 metres and had a shopping trip planned until Brightwell's disappointing 400 metres. She said she ran it for him and broke the world record in the process.

The captaincy of the British Team and his silver medal was the climax of his career. Aged 24 years early in 1964 he announced that he would retire after the Olympic Games. He and Packer were each appointed Member of the Order of the British Empire (MBE) in the 1965 New Year Honours for services to athletics.

In addition to his Olympic appearances, Brightwell was three times AAA British 440 yards champion, in 1960 (as the best placed British athlete at the 1960 AAA Championships) and outright winner at the 1962 AAA Championships and 1964 AAA Championships.

Brightwell and Packer were married on 19 December 1964 and had three sons: Gary, and two former Manchester City players Ian and David. Brightwell went into teaching before moving to lecture at the then Loughborough College, before taking up successive directorships with sports companies Adidas UK and Le Coq Sportif UK. He also ran a fishing tackle business for thirty years.

Brightwell lived in Congleton, Cheshire. He died in March 2022, at the age of 82.

In 2023 a meeting room at the re-opened Congleton leisure centre was named the Brightwell suite in honour of Robbie Brightwell and his wife Ann Packer.
