= Marius Theiler =

Swiss sprinter

Personal information
- Nationality: Swiss
- Born: 23 August 1938 (age 87)

Sport
- Sport: Sprinting
- Event: 4 × 400 metres relay
Medal record
Men's athletics
Representing Switzerland
European Championships
| Bronze medal – third place | 1962 Belgrade | 4×400 m |

Marius Theiler (born 23 August 1938) is a Swiss sprinter. He won bronze in the men's 4 × 400 metres relay event at the 1962 European Athletics Championships. Two years later, he competed in the men's 4 × 400 metres relay at the 1964 Summer Olympics.
