= Adrian Metcalfe =

British athlete (1942–2021)

Adrian Metcalfe OBE
Personal information
- Nationality: British (English)
- Born: 2 March 1942 Bradford, England
- Died: 2 July 2021 (aged 79)
- Height: 1.88 m (6 ft 2 in)
- Weight: 87 kg (192 lb)

Sport
- Sport: Athletics
- Event: 400m
- Club: University of Oxford AC; Achilles Club; Leeds AC
Medal record
Men's athletics
Representing Great Britain
Olympic Games
Silver medal – second place	1964 Tokyo	4 × 400 metres relay
European Championships
Silver medal – second place	1962 Belgrade	4 × 400 metres relay
Summer Universiade
Gold medal – first place	1963 Porto Alegre	4 × 440m relay
Representing England
British Empire & Commonwealth Games
Silver medal – second place	1962 Perth	4 × 440 yards relay

Adrian Peter Metcalfe OBE (2 March 1942 – 2 July 2021) was a British athlete and broadcaster. He set a UK record for the 400m in 1961 and won silver relay medals at the 1962 British Empire and Commonwealth Games, the 1962 European Athletics Championships and the 1964 Summer Olympics. He moved into broadcasting, first as a commentator, then as head of sport at Channel 4 and then at Eurosport. He held roles at the International Olympic Committee and International Association of Athletics Federations and was appointed an Officer of the Order of the British Empire (OBE) for services to sport in 2001.

== Early life ==
Metcalfe was born on 2 March 1942 in Bradford to Hylton and Cora Metcalfe and brought up in Leeds, along with his sister Lynne. His father was a manager at Yorkshire Bank and his mother a teacher. He attended The Brunts School after his father became manager of the Midland Bank in Mansfield, and went on to study English at Magdalen College, Oxford, where he was also president of the athletics club.

== Athletics career ==
Metcalfe won an English Schools athletics title as a schoolboy. In 1961, he won the 100, 220 and 440 yards in record times in the Varsity match and broke Robbie Brightwell's UK 400m record with a time of 45.7 seconds. He became the British 440 yards champion after winning the British AAA Championships title at the 1961 AAA Championships and would win a second AAA title at the 1963 AAA Championships.

He was a relay silver medallist with England at the 1962 British Empire and Commonwealth Games in Perth, Australia, and with Great Britain at the 1962 European Championships in Belgrade, Yugoslavia.

He won the gold medal in the men's 4 × 400 metres relay at the 1963 Summer Universiade, with Menzies Campbell, John Boulter and Dick Steane.

Metcalfe competed for Great Britain in the 1964 Summer Olympics held in Tokyo in the 4 × 400 m relay where he won the silver medal with his teammates Tim Graham, John Cooper and Robbie Brightwell.

== Business career ==
Metcalfe began working in television, commentating on athletics for ITV, before joining Channel 4 where he was head of sport, introducing lesser-known foreign sports such as American football and Sumo to British viewers. He joined the pan-European sports channel Eurosport in 1989 and then Tyne Tees TV before becoming an executive producer with the International Olympic Committee Olympic Broadcasting Services. In 1998, Metcalfe invested in a web-based project, worldsport.com, working with a large number of international sports federations but the project failed. He also held roles with the International Association of Athletics Federations, serving on marketing and television commissions until 2011.

== Personal life ==
Metcalfe was married twice with two children and three step-children.

He lived in France with his second wife, before moving to the Sunrise of Winchester retirement home in Winchester in 2011.

He died on 2 July 2021, aged 79. A painting depicting Metcalfe's life and sporting achievements painted by his sister Lynne, who discovered art therapy after having a stroke, was donated to the Sunrise of Winchester retirement home and is now displayed there as a memorial to Metcalfe.
