= Viktor Bychkov (athlete) =

Russian sprinter

Personal information
- Nationality: Russian
- Born: 14 January 1938 (age 88) Moscow, Soviet Union

Sport
- Sport: Sprinting
- Event: 400 metres

Viktor Bychkov (born 14 January 1938) is a Russian sprinter. He competed in the men's 400 metres at the 1964 Summer Olympics.
