= Bruno Bianchi (athlete) =

Italian sprinter

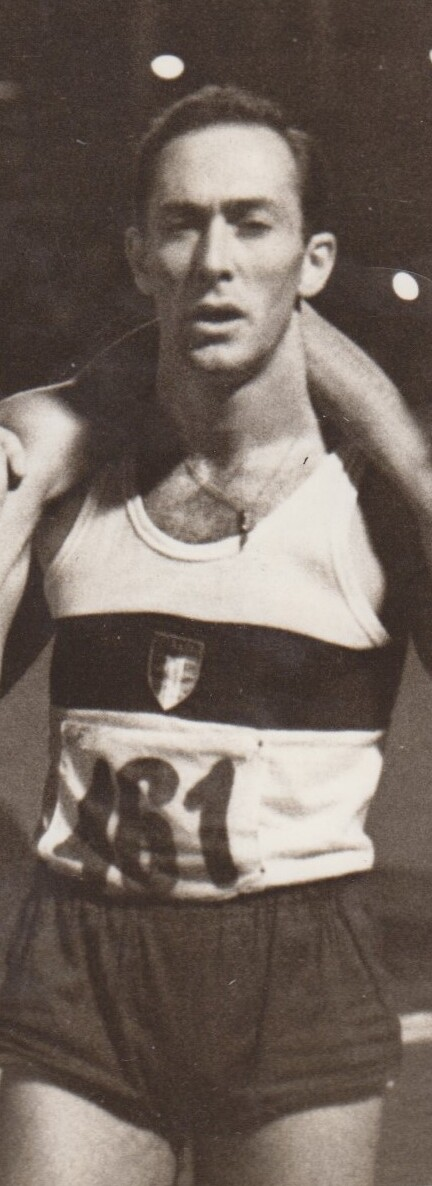
- Bianchi in 1966

Personal information
- Nationality: Italian
- Born: 8 February 1939 (age 87) Genoa, Italy
- Height: 1.85 m (6 ft 1 in)
- Weight: 72 kg (159 lb)

Sport
- Country: Italy
- Sport: Athletics
- Event: Sprint
- Club: Lilion Snia Varedo

Achievements and titles
- Personal best: 400 m: 47.4 (1967)
Medal record
European Indoor Games
Silver medal – second place	1966 Dortmund	4+3+2+1 laps relay
Summer Universiade
Gold medal – first place	1965 Budapest	4x400 metres relay

Bruno Bianchi (born 8 February 1939) is an Italian former sprinter, mainly specialized in 400 metres, who won two medals with the national relay team at the International athletics competitions.

== Biography ==
Bruno Bianchi participated in one edition of the Summer Olympics (1964), he has 26 caps in national team from 1961 to 1971.

== Achievements ==
Year	Competition	Venue	Position	Event	Performance	Notes
1964	Olympic Games	(Japan) Tokyo	7th	4 × 400 m relay	3:04.6	

== National titles ==
Bruno Bianchi has won 3 times the individual national championship.

- 1 win in 400 metres (1964)
- 2 wins in 400 metres indoor (1970, 1971)

== See also ==
- Italy national relay team
