= Mario Fraschini =

Italian sprinter

Personal information
- National team: Italy
- Born: 24 November 1938 Pizzighettone, Italy
- Died: 16 August 1983 (aged 44)

Sport
- Sport: Athletics
- Event: 400 metres
- Club: G.S. Fiamme Oro

Achievements and titles
- Personal best: 400 m: 46.8 (1962)
Medal record
Summer Universiade
| Silver medal – second place | 1959 Turin | 4x400 metres relay |
| Bronze medal – third place | 1963 Porto Alegre | 4x400 metres relay |

Mario Fraschini (24 November 1938 – 16 August 1983) was an Italian sprinter, who won two medals at the Summer Universiade with the Italy national relay team. He was born in Pizzighettone, Italy

== Career ==
Fraschini participated in one edition of the Summer Olympics (1960). He earned 19 caps in national team, from 1958 to 1965.

== Achievements ==
| Year | Competition | Venue | Position | Event | Performance |
|---|---|---|---|---|---|
| 1960 | Olympic Games | (Italy) Rome | SF | 4 × 400 m relay | 3:07.7 |

== National titles ==
Fraschini won six national championships at the individual senior level.

- Italian Athletics Championships
  - 400 m: 1958, 1960, 1961, 1962, 1963 (5)
  - 800 m: 1960 (5)

== See also ==
- Italy national relay team
