= Johannes Schmitt =

German athlete

Personal information
- Born: 18 February 1943 Berlin, West Germany
- Died: 28 December 2003 (aged 60) Küssnacht, Switzerland

Sport
- Sport: Track and field
Medal record
Representing West Germany
European Championships
Gold medal – first place	1962 Belgrade	4×400m relay
Summer Universiade
Silver medal – second place	1963 Porto Alegre	4x400m relay

Johannes Schmitt (18 February 1943 – 28 December 2003) was a German athlete, born in Berlin, who competed in the 1964 Summer Olympics.
