= Jacques Pennewaert =

Belgian runner

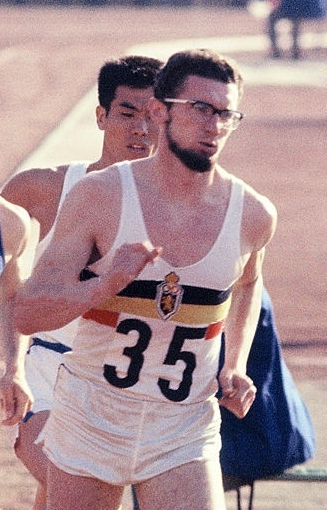
- Jacques Pennewaert at the 1964 Olympics

Personal information
- Born: 11 March 1940 Brussels, Belgium
- Died: 16 July 2016 (aged 76)
- Height: 1.84 m (6 ft 0 in)
- Weight: 76 kg (168 lb)

Sport
- Sport: Athletics
- Event(s): 400 m, 800 m
- Club: Racing Club de Bruxelles

Achievements and titles
- Personal best(s): 400 m – 46.8 (1962); 800 m – 1:47.0 (1964)
Medal record
Representing Belgium
Summer Universiade
| Silver medal – second place | 1961 Sofia | 400 m |
| Bronze medal – third place | 1963 Porto Alegre | 400 m |

Jacques Pennewaert (11 March 1940 – 16 July 2016) was a Belgian runner. He competed in the 400 m and 800 m events at the 1964 and 1968 Olympics, achieving his best result of eighth place in the 800 m in 1964.
