= Athletics at the 1963 Mediterranean Games =

1963 Athletics at the Mediterranean Games

- Dates: 27–29 September
- Host city: (Italy) Naples
- Venue: Stadio San Paolo
- Events: 21
- Participation: 13 nations

Athletics at the 1963 Mediterranean Games were held in Naples, Italy and took place from 27 to 29 Semptember.

== Medal table ==
* Host nation (Italy)

Rank	Nation	Gold	Silver	Bronze	Total
1	Italy*	8	5	6	19
2	France	5	9	6	20
3	Yugoslavia	3	3	2	8
4	Spain	2	2	2	6
5	Tunisia	2	1	1	4
6	Morocco	1	0	2	3
7	Greece	0	1	1	2
8	Turkey	0	0	1	1
Totals (8 entries)		21	21	21	63

== Medal summary ==
Event	Gold		Silver		Bronze	
100 metres	Claude Piquemal (FRA)	10.5	Livio Berruti (ITA)	10.6	Lazar Benakoun (MAR)	11.0
200 metres	Livio Berruti (ITA)	21.1	Armando Sardi (ITA)	21.3	Sergio Ottolina (ITA)	21.6
400 metres	Michel Hiblot (FRA)	47.6	Nikolaos Regoukos (GRE)	48.0	Jean-Pierre Boccardo (FRA)	48.4
800 metres	Francesco Bianchi (ITA)	1:50.6	François Châtelet (FRA)	1:50.7	Jean Pellez (FRA)	1:51.3
1500 metres	Jean Wadoux (FRA)	3:54.4	Tomás Barris (ESP)	3:54.5	Brahim Chemmam (TUN)	3:55.7
5000 metres	Mohammed Gammoudi (TUN)	14:07.4 GR	Jean Fayolle (FRA)	14:09.3	Fernando Aguilar (ESP)	14:12.6
10,000 metres	Mohammed Gammoudi (TUN)	29:34.2 GR	Franc Červan (YUG)	29:44.8	Iluminado Corcuera (ESP)	29:54.6
Marathon	Bakir Benaïssa (MAR)	2:26:50	Francesco Putti (ITA)	2:36:27	Hüseyin Aktaş (TUR)	2:41:03
110 metres hurdles	Michel Chardel (FRA)	13.9 GR	Marcel Duriez (FRA)	14.1	Giorgio Mazza (ITA)	14.1
400 metres hurdles	Roberto Frinolli (ITA)	51.4 GR	Eddy Van Praagh (FRA)	52.2	Robert Poirier (FRA)	52.4
4 x 100 metres relay	Italy; Livio Berruti; Pasquale Giannattasio; Sergio Ottolina; Armando Sardi	40.1 GR	France; Jean-Louis Brugier; Paul Genevay; Claude Piquemal; Jocelyn Delecour	40.1	Morocco; Lazar Benakoun; Medkour; Bouchaib El Maachi; Anyamah	41.3
4 x 400 metres relay	France; Eddy van Praagh; Jean-Claude Leriche; Jean-Pierre Boccardo; Michel Hiblot	3:11.8 GR	Spain; Juan Francisco Suárez; Francisco Sainz; Virgilio González; Pablo Cano	3:13.7	Greece; Nikolaos Georgopoulos; Alexandros Froussios; Nikolaos Regoukos; Athanasios Vogiatzis	3:15.4
50 km walk	Abdon Pamich (ITA)	4:33:13 GR	Ahmed Naceur Ben Messaoud (TUN)	4:39:47	Gianni Corsaro (ITA)	4:44:38
High jump	Mauro Bogliatto (ITA)	2.03 m GR	Dragan Andjelković (YUG)	2.00 m	Raymond Dugarreau (FRA)	1.95 m
Pole vault	Roman Lešek (YUG)	4.75 m GR	Roland Gras (FRA)	4.55 m	Hervé d'Encausse (FRA)	4.55 m
Long jump	Luis Felipe Areta (ESP)	7.48 m	Jean Cochard (FRA)	7.44 m	Alain Lefèvre (FRA)	7.41 m
Triple jump	Luis Felipe Areta (ESP)	15.65 m	Giuseppe Gentile (ITA)	15.50 m	Vladimir Njaradi (YUG)	15.25 m
Shot put	Silvano Meconi (ITA)	17.82 m GR	Boško Tomasović (YUG)	17.73 m	Petar Barišić (YUG)	17.49 m
Discus throw	Dako Radošević (YUG)	53.96 m	Gaetano Dalla Pria (ITA)	52.95 m	Franco Grossi (ITA)	52.85 m
Hammer throw	Zvonko Bezjak (YUG)	63.59 m GR	Guy Husson (FRA)	63.20 m	Ennio Boschini (ITA)	59.70 m
Javelin throw	Carlo Lievore (ITA)	77.75 m GR	Christian Monneret (FRA)	76.03 m	Vanni Rodeghiero (ITA)	74.16 m

== Results ==
=== 100 meters ===
Heats – 28 September

Rank	Heat	Name	Nationality	Time	Notes
1	1	Sergio Ottolina	Italy	11.0	Q
2	1	Ioannis Komitoudis	Greece	11.1	Q
3	1	Aydin Onur	Turkey	11.3	Q
4	1	M. Hamed	Morocco	11.5	
	1	Jocelyn Delecour	France	DNS	
	1	Paul Genevay	France	DNS	
	1	Bouchaib El Maachi	Morocco	DNS	
1	2	Claude Piquemal	France	10.5	Q
2	2	Livio Berruti	Italy	10.6	Q
3	2	Lazar Benakoun	Morocco	10.8	Q
4	2	Ennio Preatoni	Italy	10.8	
5	2	José Luis Sánchez	Spain	11.2	
	2	Nikolaos Georgopoulos	Greece	DNS	

Final – 28 September

Rank	Name	Nationality	Time	Notes
1st place, gold medalist(s)	Claude Piquemal	France	10.5	
2nd place, silver medalist(s)	Livio Berruti	Italy	10.6	
3rd place, bronze medalist(s)	Lazar Benakoun	Morocco	11.0	
4	Ioannis Komitoudis	Greece	11.0	
5	Aydin Onur	Turkey	11.4	
	Sergio Ottolina	Italy	DNS	

=== 200 meters ===
Heats – 27 September

Rank	Heat	Name	Nationality	Time	Notes
1	1	Armando Sardi	Italy	21.3	Q
2	1	Livio Berruti	Italy	21.5	Q
3	1	Jean-Louis Brugier	France	21.9	Q
4	1	Ioannis Komitoudis	Greece	22.3	
	1	Bouchaib El Maachi	Morocco	DNF	
	1	Rishe	Syria	DNS	
1	2	Sergio Ottolina	Italy	21.6	Q
2	2	Paul Genevay	France	21.8	Q
3	2	José Luis Sánchez	Spain	22.4	
4	2	Nikolaos Georgopoulos	Greece	22.9	Q
	2	Aydin Onur	Turkey	DNS	

Final – 28 September

Rank	Name	Nationality	Time	Notes
1st place, gold medalist(s)	Livio Berruti	Italy	21.1	
2nd place, silver medalist(s)	Armando Sardi	Italy	21.3	
3rd place, bronze medalist(s)	Sergio Ottolina	Italy	21.6	
4	Paul Genevay	France	21.7	
5	Jean-Louis Brugier	France	22.0	
6	José Luis Sánchez	Spain	22.3	

=== 400 meters ===
Heats – 27 September

Rank	Heat	Name	Nationality	Time	Notes
1	1	Jean-Pierre Boccardo	France	48.6	Q
2	1	Juan Francisco Suárez	Spain	48.9	Q
3	1	Jean-Claude Leriche	France	48.9	Q
4	1	Athanasios Vogiatzis	Greece	49.5	
5	1	Bruno Pistori	Italy	49.5	
6	1	José Manuel Álvarez	Spain	50.3	
1	2	Nikolaos Regoukos	Greece	48.8	Q
2	2	Michel Hiblot	France	??.?	Q
3	2	Pablo Cano	Spain	49.2	Q
4	2	Bruno Bianchi	Italy	49.3	
5	2	Medkour	Morocco	??.?	
	2	Harmanini	Syria	DNS	

Final – 28 September

Rank	Name	Nationality	Time	Notes
1st place, gold medalist(s)	Michel Hiblot	France	47.6	
2nd place, silver medalist(s)	Nikolaos Regoukos	Greece	48.0	
3rd place, bronze medalist(s)	Jean-Pierre Boccardo	France	48.4	
4	Jean-Claude Leriche	France	48.5	
5	Juan Francisco Suárez	Spain	48.6	
6	Pablo Cano	Spain	49.7	

=== 800 meters ===
Heats – 27 September

Rank	Heat	Name	Nationality	Time	Notes
1	1	Francesco Bianchi	Italy	1:49.5	Q, GR,
2	1	Jean Pellez	France	1:51.0	Q
3	1	Brahim Chemmam	Tunisia	1:51.0	
4	1	Ziani	Morocco	1:57.7	
5	1	Atilano Amigo	Spain	2:00.1	
	1	Dihne	Syria	DNS	
1	2	Virgilio González	Spain	1:53.3	Q
2	2	Maurice Lurot	France	1:53.3	Q
3	2	Giorgio Reggiani	Italy	1:54.5	
4	2	Ekrem Koçak	Turkey	1:55.3	
	1	Haj Ali	Syria	DNS	
1	3	François Châtelet	France	1:52.3	Q
2	3	Tomás Barris	Spain	1:52.6	Q
3	3	Gianni Del Buono	Italy	1:52.9	
4	3	Mohamed Guenniche	Tunisia	1:53.0	
5	3	Boumansour	Morocco	1:55.5	

Final – 28 September

Rank	Name	Nationality	Time	Notes
1st place, gold medalist(s)	Francesco Bianchi	Italy	1:50.6	
2nd place, silver medalist(s)	François Châtelet	France	1:50.7	
3rd place, bronze medalist(s)	Jean Pellez	France	1:51.3	
4	Tomás Barris	Spain	1:51.5	
5	Virgilio González	Spain	1:51.7	
6	Maurice Lurot	France	1:51.8	

=== 1500 meters ===
29 September

Rank	Name	Nationality	Time	Notes
1st place, gold medalist(s)	Jean Wadoux	France	3:54.4	
2nd place, silver medalist(s)	Tomás Barris	Spain	3:54.5	
3rd place, bronze medalist(s)	Brahim Chemmam	Tunisia	3:55.7	
4	Messimertzis Georgios	Greece	3:55.9	
5	Mohamed Guenniche	Tunisia	3:56.5	
6	Gianfranco Sommaggio	Italy	3:58.2	
7	Renzo Finelli	Italy	3:58.7	
8	Siraj	Morocco	3:58.7	

=== 5000 meters ===
28 September

Rank	Name	Nationality	Time	Notes
1st place, gold medalist(s)	Mohammed Gammoudi	Tunisia	14:07.4	GR
2nd place, silver medalist(s)	Jean Fayolle	France	14:09.3	
3rd place, bronze medalist(s)	Fernando Aguilar	Spain	14:12.6	
4	Jean Vaillant	France	14:16.2	
5	Muharrem Dalkılıç	Turkey	14:33.6	
6	Cahit Önel	Turkey	14:40.2	
7	Simo Važic	Yugoslavia	??:??.?	
8	Slavko Špan	Yugoslavia	??:??.?	
9	Alfredo Rizzo	Italy	14:49.8	
10	Labidi Ayachi	Tunisia	??:??.?	
11	H. Hamrouni	Tunisia	??:??.?	
12	Luigi Conti	Italy	15:15.6	
	Deif	Syria	DNS	
	Iluminado Corcuera	Spain	DNS	

=== 10,000 meters ===
Rank	Name	Nationality	Time	Notes
1st place, gold medalist(s)	Mohammed Gammoudi	Tunisia	29:34.2	GR
2nd place, silver medalist(s)	Franc Červan	Yugoslavia	29:44.8	
3rd place, bronze medalist(s)	Iluminado Corcuera	Spain	29:54.6	
4	Şükrü Saban	Turkey	30:11.4	
5	M'Hadded Hannachi	Tunisia	30:41.6	
6	Fernando Aguilar	Spain	31:06.2	
	Franco Antonelli	Italy	DNF	
	Gioacchino De Palma	Italy	DNF	
	Deif	Syria	DNS	

=== Marathon ===
28 September

Rank	Name	Nationality	Time	Notes
1st place, gold medalist(s)	Bachir Benaïssa	Morocco	2:26:50	
2nd place, silver medalist(s)	Francesco Putti	Italy	2:36:27	
3rd place, bronze medalist(s)	Hüseyin Aktaş	Turkey	2:41:03	
4	Ali Chihaoui	Tunisia	2:47:04	
	Hedhili Ben Boubaker	Tunisia	DQ	(Note: Disqualified for having shortened the course by about 2 kilometres.)

=== 110 meters hurdles ===
Heats

Rank	Heat	Name	Nationality	Time	Notes
1	1	Michel Chardel	France	14.2	Q, GR
2	1	Bernard Fournet	France	14.5	Q
3	1	Giovanni Cornacchia	Italy	14.6	Q
4	1	Çetin Şahiner	Turkey	15.0	
	1	Tarmanini	Syria	DNS	
1	2	Marcel Duriez	France	14.3	Q
2	2	Eddy Ottoz	Italy	14.4	Q
3	2	Giorgio Mazza	Italy	14.5	Q
4	2	Milad Petrušić	Yugoslavia	14.9	
5	2	Anyamah	Morocco	15.4	

Final

Rank	Name	Nationality	Time	Notes
1st place, gold medalist(s)	Michel Chardel	France	13.9	GR, NR
2nd place, silver medalist(s)	Marcel Duriez	France	14.1	
3rd place, bronze medalist(s)	Giorgio Mazza	Italy	14.1	
4	Bernard Fournet	France	14.3	
5	Eddy Ottoz	Italy	14.3	
6	Giovanni Cornacchia	Italy	14.5	

=== 400 meters hurdles ===
Heats

Rank	Heat	Name	Nationality	Time	Notes
1	1	Edmond Van Praagh	France	53.4	Q
2	1	Philippe Danic	France	53.4	Q
3	1	Roberto Frinolli	Italy	53.6	Q
4	1	Alexandros Froussios	Greece	54.3	
5	1	Fahir Özgüder	Turkey	54.9	
1	2	Erminio Malacalza	Italy	54.4	Q
2	2	Mohamed Zouaki	Morocco	54.5	Q
3	2	Robert Poirier	France	57.8	Q
	2	Bajdouj	Syria	DNS	
	2	Salvatore Morale	Italy	DNS	

Final

Rank	Name	Nationality	Time	Notes
1st place, gold medalist(s)	Roberto Frinolli	Italy	51.4	GR
2nd place, silver medalist(s)	Edmond Van Praagh	France	52.2	
3rd place, bronze medalist(s)	Robert Poirier	France	52.4	
4	Erminio Malacalza	Italy	53.2	
5	Philippe Danic	France	53.7	
6	Mohamed Zouaki	Morocco	54.2	

=== 4 × 100 meters relay ===
Rank	Nation	Competitors	Time	Notes
1st place, gold medalist(s)	Italy	Livio Berruti, Pasquale Giannattasio, Sergio Ottolina, Armando Sardi	40.1	GR
2nd place, silver medalist(s)	France	Jean-Louis Brugier, Paul Genevay, Claude Piquemal, Jocelyn Delecour	40.1	
3rd place, bronze medalist(s)	Morocco	Lazar Benakoun, Medkour, Bouchaib El Maachi, Anyamah	41.3	
4	Greece	Nikolaos Georgopoulos, Leonidas Kormalis, Constantin Lolos, Ioannis Komitoudis	41.5	

=== 4 × 400 meters relay ===
29 September

Rank	Nation	Competitors	Time	Notes
1st place, gold medalist(s)	France	Eddy van Praagh, Jean-Claude Leriche, Jean-Pierre Boccardo, Michel Hiblot	3:11.8	GR
2nd place, silver medalist(s)	Spain	Juan Francisco Suárez, Francisco Sainz, Virgilio González, Pablo Cano	3:13.7	
3rd place, bronze medalist(s)	Greece	Nikolaos Georgopoulos, Alexandros Froussios, Nikolaos Regoukos, Athanasios Vogiatzis	3:15.4	
	Italy	Bruno Pistori, Giorgio Mazza, Giorgio Reggiani, Bruno Bianchi	DQ	

=== 50 kilometers walk ===
29 September

Rank	Name	Nationality	Time	Notes
1st place, gold medalist(s)	Abdon Pamich	Italy	4:33:13	GR
2nd place, silver medalist(s)	Ahmed Naceur Ben Messaoud	Tunisia	4:39:47	
3rd place, bronze medalist(s)	Gianni Corsaro	Italy	4:44:38	
4	Hamed Nadhari	Tunisia	4:48:15	
5	Chedli Benali	Tunisia	4:52:32	
6	Pascal Aparici	Spain	5:16:00	
	Jacques Arnoux	France	DNF	
	Elio Massi	Italy	DNF	

=== High jump ===
Rank	Name	Nationality	Result	Notes
1st place, gold medalist(s)	Mauro Bogliatto	Italy	2.03	GR
2nd place, silver medalist(s)	Dragan Anđelković	Yugoslavia	2.00	
3rd place, bronze medalist(s)	Raymond Dugarreau	France	1.95	
4	Miodrag Todosijević	Yugoslavia	1.95	
5	Walter Zamparelli	Italy	1.95	
6	Stylianos Sevastopoulos	Greece	1.95	
7	Maurice Fournier	France	1.90	
7	Roberto Galli	Italy	1.90	
9	Guy Guézille	France	1.90	

=== Pole vault ===
Rank	Name	Nationality	Result	Notes
1st place, gold medalist(s)	Roman Lešek	Yugoslavia	4.75	GR
2nd place, silver medalist(s)	Roland Gras	France	4.55	
3rd place, bronze medalist(s)	Hervé d'Encausse	France	4.55	
4	Giacomo Catenacci	Italy	4.30	
5	Haralambos Balassis	Greece	4.30	
6	Franco Sar	Italy	4.20	
7	Pietro Scaglia	Italy	4.20	

=== Long jump ===
28 September

Rank	Name	Nationality	#1	#2	#3	#4	#5	#6	Result	Notes
1st place, gold medalist(s)	Luis Felipe Areta	Spain	6.92	7.15	7.48	7.33	5.58	x	7.48	
2nd place, silver medalist(s)	Jean Cochard	France							7.44	
3rd place, bronze medalist(s)	Alain Lefèvre	France							7.41	
4	Giorgio Bortolozzi	Italy							7.37	
5	Ignacio Martínez	Spain	7.20	7.23	x	7.31	x	7.13	7.31	
6	Raffaele Piras	Italy							7.28	
7	Gianni Martinotti	Italy							7.17	
8	Gérard Mahieu	France							6.87	

=== Triple jump ===
27 September

Rank	Name	Nationality	#1	#2	#3	#4	#5	#6	Result	Notes
1st place, gold medalist(s)	Luis Felipe Areta	Spain	13.64	15.31	x	15.42	15.56	15.65	15.65	
2nd place, silver medalist(s)	Giuseppe Gentile	Italy							15.50	
3rd place, bronze medalist(s)	Vladimir Njaradi	Yugoslavia							15.25	
4	Pierluigi Gatti	Italy							15.24	
5	Rinaldo Camaioni	Italy							15.05	
6	Régis Prost	France							14.94	
7	Alain Romarin	France							14.84	
	Izmat	Syria							DNS	

=== Shot put ===
Rank	Name	Nationality	Result	Notes
1st place, gold medalist(s)	Silvano Meconi	Italy	17.82	GR
2nd place, silver medalist(s)	Boško Tomasović	Yugoslavia	17.73	
3rd place, bronze medalist(s)	Petar Barišić	Yugoslavia	17.49	
4	Pierre Colnard	France	17.20	
5	Jean-Claude Ernwein	France	16.40	
6	André Godard	France	16.30	
7	Mario Monti	Italy	15.96	
8	Ugo Tesini	Italy	15.05	
	Zoulak	Syria	DNS	

=== Discus throw ===
Rank	Name	Nationality	Result	Notes
1st place, gold medalist(s)	Dako Radošević	Yugoslavia	53.96	
2nd place, silver medalist(s)	Gaetano Dalla Pria	Italy	52.95	
3rd place, bronze medalist(s)	Franco Grossi	Italy	52.85	
4	Antonios Kounadis	Greece	51.73	
5	Pierre Alard	France	50.73	
6	Paul Perrot	France	45.67	
7	Carmelo Rado	Italy	43.09	
	Zoulak	Syria	DNS	
	Guy Husson	France	DNS	

=== Hammer throw ===
Rank	Name	Nationality	Result	Notes
1st place, gold medalist(s)	Zvonko Bezjak	Yugoslavia	63.59	GR
2nd place, silver medalist(s)	Guy Husson	France	63.20	
3rd place, bronze medalist(s)	Ennio Boschini	Italy	59.70	
4	Manlio Cristin	Italy	56.70	
5	Roland Tonelli	France	56.17	
6	Gilbert Combet	France	53.96	
	Bitar	Syria	DNS	

=== Javelin throw ===
27 September

Rank	Name	Nationality	Result	Notes
1st place, gold medalist(s)	Carlo Lievore	Italy	77.75	GR
2nd place, silver medalist(s)	Christian Monneret	France	76.03	
3rd place, bronze medalist(s)	Vanni Rodeghiero	Italy	74.16	
4	Léon Syrovatski	France	72.58	
5	Raymond Lambolley	France	69.88	
6	Christos Pierrakos	Greece	69.41	
7	Raffaele Bonaiuto	Italy	66.28	
	Alfonso de Andrés	Spain	NM	
