= 1964 Italian Athletics Championships =

- Dates: 27–29 June
- Host city: Milan
- Level: Senior

The 1964 Italian Athletics Championships was the 54th edition of the Italian Athletics Championships and were held in Milan (track & field events).

== Champions ==
=== Men ===
Event	Athlete	Performance
100 metres	Sergio Ottolina	10.3
200 metres	Sergio Ottolina	20.5
400 metres	Bruno Bianchi	48.0
800 metres	Francesco Bianchi	1:48.8
1500 metres	Francesco Bianchi	3:48.1
5000 metres	Antonio Ambu	14:22.6
10,000 metres	Antonio Ambu	30:31.0
110 metres hurdles	Giovanni Cornacchia	14.1
400 metres hurdles	Roberto Frinolli	50.6
3000 metres steeplechase	Alfredo Rizzo	9:04.0
High jump	Vittoriano Drovandi	2.00
Pole vault	Renato Dionisi	4.40
Long jump	Giorgio Bortolozzi	7.51
Triple jump	Pierluigi Gatti	15.55
Shot put	Silvano Meconi	16.69
Discus throw	Gaetano Dalla Pria	53.76
Hammer throw	Manlio Cristin	57.99
Javelin throw	Carlo Lievore	76.71*
Decathlon	Franco Sar	7196
Half Marathon	Antonio Ambu	1:01:35#
Marathon	Antonio Ambu	2:15:42†
10,000 metres track walk	Abdon Pamich	45:08.4
20 km road walk	Abdon Pamich	01:29:32
50 km road walk	Abdon Pamich	04:08:30
Cross country (long course)	Antonio Ambu	

=== Women ===
Event	Athlete	Performance
100 metres	Giovanna Carboncini	12.0
200 metres	Giovanna Carboncini	24.5
400 metres	Luisa Cesari	57.5
800 metres	Silvana Acquarone	2:13.4
1500 metres	-	-
3000 metres	-	-
100 metres hurdles	Letizia Bertoni	11.5*
400 metres hurdles	-	-
3000 metres steeplechase	-	-
High jump	Osvalda Giardi	1.60
Pole vault	-	-
Long jump	Magaly Vettorazzo	6.11
Triple jump	-	-
Shot put	Elivia Ricci	13.42
Discus throw	Elivia Ricci	48.79
Hammer throw	-	-
Javelin throw	Elide Riccabono	42.22*
Pentathlon	Osvalda Giardi	3890p
Marathon	-	-
Cross country (long course)	Fernanda Ferrucci	
