= 1963 Italian Athletics Championships =

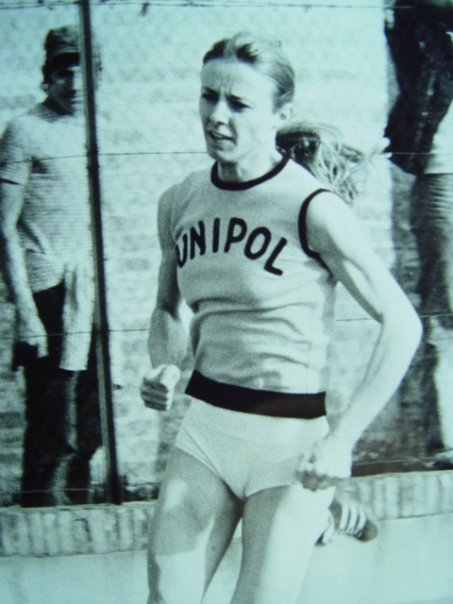
- Donata Govoni, Italian champion in 100 and 200 metres in this edition.
- Dates: 19–21 July
- Host city: Trieste
- Venue: Stadio Giuseppe Grezar
- Level: Senior
- Events: 29 (19 men, 10 women)

The 1963 Italian Athletics Championships was the 53rd edition of the Italian Athletics Championships and were held in Trieste (track & field events).

== Other venues and dates ==
The events of combined events, half marathon, marathon, racewalking road and cross country running, were not held in the main venue Trieste, but in other locations and other dates.

- Formia, 26-27 October (combined events)
- Recco, 23 June (20 km race walk road)
- Naples, 29 September (50 km race walk road)
- Sassari, 1 September (half marathon)
- Reggio Calabria, 15 November (marathon)
- Rome, 3 March (cross-country running men)
- Camerlata, 12 March (cross-country running women)

== Champions ==
Events held in different venues and dates

=== Men ===
Event	Athlete	Performance
100 metres	Sergio Ottolina	10.4
200 metres	Armando Sardi	21.2
400 metres	Mario Fraschini	47.4
800 metres	Francesco Bianchi	1:48.7
1500 metres	Francesco Bianchi	3:51.7
5000 metres	Luigi Conti	14:42.6
10,000 metres	Luigi Conti	31:08.8
110 metres hurdles	Giorgio Mazza	14.0
400 metres hurdles	Roberto Frinolli	50.5
3000 metres steeplechase	Alfredo Rizzo	9:07.5
High jump	Roberto Galli	1.95
Pole vault	Franco Sar	4.20
Long jump	Raffaele Piras	7.42
Triple jump	Rinaldo Camaioni	15.68
Shot put	Silvano Meconi	17.96
Discus throw	Franco Grossi	51.34
Hammer throw	Ennio Boschini	59.71
Javelin throw	Vanni Rodeghiero	69.57
Decathlon	Franco Sar	7343
Half Marathon	Silvio De Florentis	1:03:28
Marathon	Giorgio Jegmer	02:27:51
10,000 metres track walk	Abdon Pamich	45:49.6
20 km road walk	Abdon Pamich	01:35:05
50 km road walk	Abdon Pamich	04:33:13
Cross country (long course)	Antonio Ambu	

=== Women ===
Event	Athlete	Performance
100 metres	Donata Govoni	11.9
200 metres	Donata Govoni	24.4
400 metres	Armida Guzzetti	56.6
800 metres	Gilda Jannaccone	2:11.5
1500 metres	-	-
3000 metres	-	-
100 metres hurdles	Letizia Bertoni	11.1
400 metres hurdles	-	-
3000 metres steeplechase	-	-
High jump	Marinella Bortoluzzi	1.58
Pole vault	-	-
Long jump	Magaly Vettorazzo	6.08
Triple jump	-	-
Shot put	Elivia Ricci	12.47
Discus throw	Elivia Ricci	45.85
Hammer throw	-	-
Javelin throw	Maria Mazzacurati	38.85
Pentathlon	Magaly Vettorazzo	4245p
Cross country (long course)	Gilda Jannaccone	
