= France at the 1963 Mediterranean Games =

- IOC code: FRA
- NOC: French Olympic Committee

in Naples
- Competitors: 72 (all men)
- Medals Ranked 3rd: Gold 17 Silver 24 Bronze 14 Total 55

Mediterranean Games appearances (overview)
- 1951; 1955; 1959; 1963; 1967; 1971; 1975; 1979; 1983; 1987; 1991; 1993; 1997; 2001; 2005; 2009; 2013; 2018; 2022; 2026

France competed at the 1963 Mediterranean Games in Naples, Italy.

== Medalists ==
=== Gold ===
- Claude Piquemal — Athletics, 100 metres
- Michel Hiblot — Athletics, 400 metres
- Jean Wadoux — Athletics, 1500 metres
- Michel Chardles — Athletics, 110 metres hurdles
- Eddy van Praagh, Jean-Claude Leriche, Jean-Pierre Boccardo, Michel Hiblot — Athletics, 4 x 400 metres relay
- Bernard Monnereau — Rowing, Single sculls
- Bernard Monnereau, René Duhamel — Rowing, Double sculls
- ????? — Rowing, Coxed fours
- ????????? — Rowing, Eights
- Christian Cuch — Cycling, Individual pursuit
- Francis Bazire — Cycling, Individual road race
- Jean-Claude Magnan — Fencing, Individual foil
- Yves Dreyfus — Fencing, Individual épée
- Georges Ballery — Wrestling, Freestyle 63 kg
- Alain Gottvallès — Swimming, 100 metres freestyle
- Francis Luyce — Swimming, 400 metres freestyle
- Jean Pommat, Jean-Pascal Curtillet, Gérard Gropaiz, Francis Luyce, Alain Gottvallès (heats) — Swimming, 4 × 200 m freestyle relay

=== Silver ===
- François Châtelet — Athletics, 800 metres
- Jean Fayolle — Athletics, 5000 metres
- Marcel Duriez — Athletics, 110 metres hurdles
- Eddy Van Praagh — Athletics, 400 metres hurdles
- Jean-Louis Brugier, Paul Genevay, Claude Piquemal, Jocelyn Delecour — Athletics, 4 x 100 metres relay
- Roland Gras — Athletics, Pole vault
- Jean Cochard — Athletics, Long jump
- Guy Husson — Athletics, Hammer throw
- Christian Monneret — Athletics, Javelin throw
- ???? — Rowing, Coxless fours
- Bruno — Boxing, Light heavyweight 81 kg
- Pierre Trentin — Cycling, 1000 metres time trial
- ?, Christian Cuch, Joseph Pare, Jacques Suire — Cycling, Team pursuit
- ?,? — Cycling, Tandem
- ??, Georges Chappe, Marcel-Ernest Bidault — Cycling, Team time trial 100 km
- Jean Ramez — Fencing, Individual sabre
- Claude Bourquard — Fencing, Individual épée
- André Zoete — Wrestling, Freestyle 52 kg
- René Schiermeyer — Wrestling, Freestyle 78 kg
- Francis Luyce — Swimming, 1500 metres freestyle
- Claude Raffy — Swimming, 200 metres backstroke
- ??, Jean Pommat, Robert Christophe, Alain Gottvallès — Swimming, 4 × 100 m medley relay
- ?, Roger Bourdon — Sailing, Star class
- Francis Jammes — Sailing, Finn class

=== Bronze ===
- Jean-Pierre Boccardo — Athletics, 4x100 metres Relay
- Jean Pellez — Athletics, 800 metres
- Robert Poirier — Athletics, 400 metres hurdles
- Raymond Dugarreau — Athletics, High jump
- Hervé d'Encausse — Athletics, Pole vault
- Alain Lefèvre — Athletics, Long jump
- Le Blois — Boxing, Welterweight 67 kg
- Daniel Morelon — Cycling, Sprint
- Lucien Aimar — Cycling, Road race
- Jacky Courtillat — Fencing, Individual foil
- Claude Arabo — Fencing, Individual sabre
- Jean Guillou, Michel Bouchonnet, Bernard Fauqueux, Christian Guiffroy, Daniel Touche — Gymnastics, Team
- Christian Guiffroy — Gymnastics, Horizontal bar
- ??? — Water polo
