= 1962 Italian Athletics Championships =

- Host city: Naples
- Level: Senior

The 1962 Italian Athletics Championships was the 52nd edition of the Italian Athletics Championships and were held in Naples (track & field events).

== Champions ==
=== Men ===
Event	Athlete	Performance
100 metres	Livio Berruti	10.5
200 metres	Livio Berruti	21.1
400 metres	Mario Fraschini	47.8
800 metres	Francesco Bianchi	1:51.5
1500 metres	Francesco Bianchi	3:54.1
5000 metres	Antonio Ambu	14:39.2
10,000 metres	Antonio Ambu	30:52.4
110 metres hurdles	Giovanni Cornacchia	14.3
400 metres hurdles	Luigi Carrozza	53.0
3000 metres steeplechase	Gianfranco Sommaggio	9:19.5
High jump	Roberto Galli	2.00
Pole vault	Pietro Scaglia	4.30
Long jump	Giorgio Bortolozzi	7.24
Triple jump	Enzo Cavalli	15.43
Shot put	Silvano Meconi	17.17
Discus throw	Gaetano Dalla Pria	54.16
Hammer throw	Ennio Boschini	58.50
Javelin throw	Franco Radman	76.79*
Decathlon	Franco Sar	7005
Half Marathon	Antonio Ambu	1:05:32#
Marathon	Antonio Ambu	02:24:09
10,000 metres track walk	Abdon Pamich	44:20.2
20 km road walk	Abdon Pamich	01:33:34
50 km road walk	Abdon Pamich	04:23:12
Cross country (long course)	Luigi Conti	

=== Women ===
Event	Athlete	Performance
100 metres	Donata Govoni	12.0
200 metres	Letizia Bertoni	24.9
400 metres	Delma Savorelli	57.6
800 metres	Gilda Jannaccone	2:15.1
1500 metres	-	-
3000 metres	-	-
100 metres hurdles	Letizia Bertoni	11.3*
400 metres hurdles	-	-
3000 metres steeplechase	-	-
High jump	Osvalda Giardi	1.50
Pole vault	-	-
Long jump	Magaly Vettorazzo	5.89
Triple jump	-	-
Shot put	Claudia Conti	12.46
Discus throw	Elivia Ricci	46.51
Hammer throw	-	-
Javelin throw	Fernanda Torti	36.78*
Pentathlon	Magaly Vettorazzo	4308p
Marathon	-	-
Cross country (long course)	Gilda Jannaccone	
