= Italy at the 1963 Mediterranean Games =

- IOC code: ITA
- NOC: Italian National Olympic Committee

in Naples
- Medals Ranked 1st: Gold 42 Silver 29 Bronze 23 Total 94

Mediterranean Games appearances (overview)
- 1951; 1955; 1959; 1963; 1967; 1971; 1975; 1979; 1983; 1987; 1991; 1993; 1997; 2001; 2005; 2009; 2013; 2018; 2022; 2026

Italy competed at the 1963 Mediterranean Games in Naples, Italy.

== Medals ==
=== Athletics ===
Sport	Gold	Silver	Bronze	Total
Athletics	8	5	6	19
Totals (1 entries)	8	5	6	19

==== Men ====
Event	1st place, gold medalist(s)	2nd place, silver medalist(s)	3rd place, bronze medalist(s)
200 metres	Livio Berruti	Armando Sardi	Sergio Ottolina
800 metres	Francesco Bianchi		
400 metres hurdles	Roberto Frinolli		
50 km walk	Abdon Pamich		Gianni Corsaro
Long jump	Mauro Bogliatto		
Shot put	Silvano Meconi		
Javelin throw	Carlo Lievore		Vanni Rodeghiero
4×100 metres relay	Livio Berruti; Pasquale Giannattasio; Sergio Ottolina; Armando Sardi		
100 metres		Livio Berruti	
Marathon		Francesco Putti	
Triple jump		Giuseppe Gentile	
Discus throw		Gaetano Dalla Pria	Franco Grossi
110 metres hurdles			Giorgio Mazza
Hammer throw			Ennio Boschini
	8	5	6
