= Athletics at the 1963 Summer Universiade – Men's long jump =

The men's long jump event at the 1963 Summer Universiade was held at the Estádio Olímpico Monumental in Porto Alegre with the final on 8 September 1963.

== Medalists ==
Gold	Silver	Bronze
Igor Ter-Ovanesyan; Soviet Union	Wolfgang Klein; West Germany	Carlos Díaz; Cuba

== Results ==
=== Qualification ===
Rank	Name	Nationality	Result	Notes
1	Alain Léfèvre	France	7.39	
2	Takashi Kato	Japan	7.34	
3	Wolfgang Klein	West Germany	7.29	
4	Igor Ter-Ovanesyan	Soviet Union	7.26	
5	Ignacio Martínez	Spain	7.19	
5	Carlos Díaz	Cuba	7.19	
7	Mike Ralph	Great Britain	7.17	
8	Hans-Joachim Walde	West Germany	7.10	
8	Esteves Costa	Portugal	7.10	
10	Gérard Mathieu	France	7.08	
11	Giorgio Bortolozzi	Italy	7.06	
12	Giuseppe Gentile	Italy	6.93	
13	Gil'ad Weingarten	Israel	6.90	
14	Luis Felipe Areta	Spain	6.88	
15	Antonio Carlos Puhl	Brazil	6.82	
16	Newton de Castro	Brazil	6.45	
17	Eduardo Figueroa	Venezuela	6.38	

=== Final ===
Rank	Athlete	Nationality	Result	Notes
1st place, gold medalist(s)	Igor Ter-Ovanesyan	Soviet Union	7.95	
2nd place, silver medalist(s)	Wolfgang Klein	West Germany	7.70	
3rd place, bronze medalist(s)	Carlos Díaz	Cuba	7.45	
4	Giorgio Bortolozzi	Italy	7.38	
5	Mike Ralph	Great Britain	7.37	
6	Alain Léfèvre	France	7.37	
7	Ignacio Martínez	Spain	7.17	
8	Gérard Mathieu	France	7.12	
9	Giuseppe Gentile	Italy	7.05	
10	Esteves Costa	Portugal	6.91	
11	Takashi Kato	Japan	6.88	
12	Hans-Joachim Walde	West Germany	6.85	
