= Rowing at the 1963 Mediterranean Games =

Rowing competition

- Venue: Lago di Patria
- Location: Naples, Italy
- Dates: September 1963

The rowing events of the 1963 Mediterranean Games were held at Lago di Patria near Naples, Italy.

== Medalists ==
Event	Gold		Silver		Bronze	
Single sculls	Bernard Monnereau (FRA)	8:21.6	Giuseppe Girone (ITA)	8:37.5	Rizk (UAR)	8:58.8
Double sculls	France (FRA); René Duhamel; Bernard Monnereau	7:14.6	Italy (ITA); Stefano Martinoli; Armido Torri	7:17.2	Yugoslavia (YUG); Franc Peterman; Srboljub Saratlić	7:30.1
Coxless pairs	Italy (ITA); Paolo Mosetti; Mario Petri	8:09.8	United Arab Republic (UAR)	9:04.7	No bronze awarded	
Coxed pairs	Yugoslavia (YUG); Mirko Štagljar; Ante Guberina; Mladen Vahčić (c)	8:22.6	Greece (GRE)	8:26.0	Italy (ITA); Gaetano Cuccurullo; Claudio Tricarico; Guido Marra	8:30.0
Coxless fours	Italy (ITA); Fulvio Balatti; Luciano Sgheiz; Romano Sgheiz; Giovanni Zucchi	6:59.3	France (FRA)	7:05.0	No bronze awarded	
Coxed fours	France (FRA)	7:25.6	Italy (ITA); Giuseppe Galante; Pietro Polti; Emilio Trivini; Giulio Vanoli; Mariano Gottifredi	7:30.4	United Arab Republic (UAR)	7:32.6
Eights	France (FRA)	6:12.8	Yugoslavia (YUG); Veljko Vrdoljak; Tonko Gabelić; Pavao Martić; Slavko Janjušević; Marko Mandić; Josip Sušić; Stjepan Mlinar; Jadran Barut; Sučurija Kahari (c)	6:24.9	United Arab Republic (UAR)	6:29.6

== Medal table ==
Rank	Nation	Gold	Silver	Bronze	Total
1	France (FRA)	4	1	0	5
2	Italy (ITA)	2	3	1	6
3	Yugoslavia (YUG)	1	1	1	3
4	United Arab Republic (UAR)	0	1	3	4
5	Greece (GRE)	0	1	0	1
Totals (5 entries)		7	7	5	19
