= Athletics at the 1960 Summer Olympics – Men's 110 metres hurdles =

Men's 110 metres hurdles at the Games of the XVII Olympiad
- Olympic Athletics
- Venue: Olympic Stadium
- Dates: September 3, 1960 (heats and quarterfinals); September 5, 1960 (semifinals and final)
- Competitors: 36 from 21 nations
- Winning time: 13.8

Medalists
1st place, gold medalist(s)		Lee Calhoun; United States
2nd place, silver medalist(s)		Willie May; United States
3rd place, bronze medalist(s)		Hayes Jones; United States

The men's 110 metres hurdling event at the 1960 Olympic Games took place between September 3 and September 5. Thirty-six athletes from 21 nations competed. The maximum number of athletes per nation had been set at 3 since the 1930 Olympic Congress. The event was won by Lee Calhoun of the United States, the first man to successfully defend Olympic gold in the 110 metres hurdles. It was the sixth of nine consecutive American victories, and the 12th overall gold medal for the United States in the 110 metres hurdles. It was also the fourth of four consecutive American podium sweeps, and the eighth overall sweep by the United States in the event.

== Background ==
This was the 14th appearance of the event, which is one of 12 athletics events to have been held at every Summer Olympics. Three finalists from 1956 returned: gold medalist Lee Calhoun of the United States, fourth-place finisher Martin Lauer of the United Team of Germany, and fifth-place finisher Stanko Lorger of Yugoslavia. Calhoun was favored to win again, though Lauer was a serious contender; they shared the world record at 13.2 seconds. Lauer was the only serious threat to the American team sweeping the medals again.

Afghanistan, the British West Indies, Iraq, Kenya, Nigeria, Sudan, and Uganda each made their first appearance in the event. The United States made its 14th appearance, the only nation to have competed in the 110 metres hurdles in each Games to that point.

== Competition format ==
For the first time, the competition expanded to four rounds. The first round consisted of four heats, with 6 or 7 hurdlers each (before a withdrawal left one heat with only 5). The top four hurdlers in each heat advanced to the quarterfinals. There were four quarterfinals of 6 hurdles each; the top three hurdlers in each quarterfinal heat advanced to the semifinals. The 12 semifinalists were divided into two semifinals of 6 hurdlers each; the top three hurdlers in each advanced to the 6-man final.

== Records ==
These were the standing world and Olympic records (in seconds) prior to the 1960 Summer Olympics.

World record	Martin Lauer (FRG)	13.2	Zürich, Switzerland	7 July 1959
Olympic record	Lee Calhoun (USA)	13.5	Melbourne, Australia	28 November 1956

No new world or Olympic records were set during the competition. The following national records were established during the competition:

Nation	Athlete	Round	Time
Uganda	Jean Baptiste Okello	Quarterfinal 1	14.3

== Schedule ==
All times are Central European Time (UTC+1)

Date	Time	Round
Saturday, 3 September 1960	9:00; 18:10	Round 1 Quarterfinals
Monday, 5 September 1960	15:15; 16:45	Semifinals; Final

== Results ==
=== Round 1 ===
The fastest four hurdlers in each of the six heats advanced to the quarterfinal round.

==== Heat 1 ====
Rank	Lane	Athlete	Nation	Time (hand)	Time (auto)	Notes
1	4	Martin Lauer	United Team of Germany	14.3	14.45	Q
2	6	Jean Baptiste Okello	Uganda	14.4	14.59	Q
3	2	Giovanni Cornacchia	Italy	14.6	14.77	Q
4	5	Marcel Duriez	France	14.7	14.90	Q
5	3	Seraphino Antao	Kenya	15.0	15.13	
6	1	Çetin Şahiner	Turkey	15.6	15.75	
				Wind: +0.2 m/s		

==== Heat 2 ====
Rank	Lane	Athlete	Nation	Time (hand)	Time (auto)	Notes
1	1	Hayes Jones	United States	14.2	14.32	Q
2	4	Mykola Berezutskiy	Soviet Union	14.3	14.50	Q
3	3	Milad Petrušić	Yugoslavia	14.6	14.74	Q
4	5	Paolo Zamboni	Italy	14.7	14.82	Q
5	2	John Chittick	Australia	14.7	14.86	
—	6	Abdul Wardak	Afghanistan	DNF		
				Wind: +0.4 m/s		

==== Heat 3 ====
Rank	Lane	Athlete	Nation	Time (hand)	Time (auto)	Notes
1	5	Willie May	United States	14.0	14.16	Q
2	3	Valentin Chistyakov	Soviet Union	14.3	14.45	Q
3	1	Bob Birrell	Great Britain	14.7	14.82	Q
4	4	Klaus Gerbig	United Team of Germany	14.7	14.87	Q
5	6	Saka Oloko	Nigeria	14.9	15.04	
6	2	Nazzar Al-Jamali	Iraq	15.8	15.99	
				Wind: +0.2 m/s		

==== Heat 4 ====
Rank	Lane	Athlete	Nation	Time (hand)	Time (auto)	Notes
1	5	Lee Calhoun	United States	14.3	14.37	Q
2	2	Edmond Roudnitska	France	14.4	14.53	Q
3	1	Ghulam Raziq	Pakistan	14.6	14.68	Q
4	6	Peter Hildreth	Great Britain	14.8	14.90	Q
5	7	Georgios Marsellos	Greece	14.8	14.92	
6	4	Pétur Rögnvaldsson	Iceland	15.2	15.38	
—	3	Isaac Elie	Sudan	DNF		
				Wind: +0.9 m/s		

==== Heat 5 ====
Rank	Lane	Athlete	Nation	Time (hand)	Time (auto)	Notes
1	6	Keith Gardner	British West Indies	14.3	14.46	Q
2	4	Stanko Lorger	Yugoslavia	14.4	14.56	Q
3	5	Nereo Svara	Italy	14.9	15.03	Q
4	1	Vic Matthews	Great Britain	14.9	15.07	Q
5	3	Jagmohan Singh	India	15.2	15.34	
6	2	Abdul Malik	Pakistan	15.4	15.52	
				Wind: +0.9 m/s		

==== Heat 6 ====
Rank	Lane	Athlete	Nation	Time (hand)	Time (auto)	Notes
1	4	Anatoly Mikhaylov	Soviet Union	14.4	14.53	Q
2	5	Karl-Ernst Schottes	United Team of Germany	14.8	14.90	Q
3	3	Roman Muzyk	Poland	14.8	14.94	Q
4	6	Aggrey Awori	Uganda	15.2	15.36	Q
5	2	Jacques Déprez	France	17.1	17.24	
—	1	Eef Kamerbeek	Netherlands	DNS		
				Wind: +0.1 m/s		

=== Quarterfinals ===
The fastest three hurdlers in each of the four heats advanced to the semifinal round.

==== Quarterfinal 1 ====
Rank	Athlete	Nation	Time (hand)	Time (auto)	Notes
1	Lee Calhoun	United States	14.1	14.16	Q
2	Jean Baptiste Okello	Uganda	14.3	14.48	Q, NR
3	Nikolay Berezutsky	Soviet Union	14.4	14.57	Q
4	Giovanni Cornacchia	Italy	14.5	14.68	
5	Peter Hildreth	Great Britain	14.6	14.78	
6	Karl-Ernst Schottes	United Team of Germany	14.6	14.81	
				Wind: +0.0 m/s	

==== Quarterfinal 2 ====
Rank	Athlete	Nation	Time (hand)	Time (auto)	Notes
1	Martin Lauer	United Team of Germany	13.9	14.06	Q
2	Keith Gardner	British West Indies	14.3	14.45	Q
3	Ghulam Raziq	Pakistan	14.4	14.51	Q
4	Edmond Roudnitska	France	14.5	14.66	
5	Milad Petrušić	Yugoslavia	14.6	14.71	
6	Paolo Zamboni	Italy	14.9	15.02	
				Wind: +0.0 m/s	

==== Quarterfinal 3 ====
Rank	Athlete	Nation	Time (hand)	Time (auto)	Notes
1	Willie May	United States	13.8	13.92	Q
2	Anatoly Mikhaylov	Soviet Union	13.9	14.02	Q
3	Stanko Lorger	Yugoslavia	14.4	14.56	Q
4	Aggrey Awori	Uganda	14.8	14.94	
5	Klaus Gerbig	United Team of Germany	14.8	14.97	
6	Vic Matthews	Great Britain	15.0	15.12	
				Wind: +0.0 m/s	

==== Quarterfinal 4 ====
Rank	Athlete	Nation	Time (hand)	Time (auto)	Notes
1	Hayes Jones	United States	14.1	14.19	Q
2	Valentin Chistyakov	Soviet Union	14.3	14.51	Q
3	Nereo Svara	Italy	14.4	14.59	Q
4	Roman Muzyk	Poland	14.5	14.68	
5	Bob Birrell	Great Britain	14.6	14.78	
6	Marcel Duriez	France	15.0	15.19	
				Wind: +0.0 m/s	

=== Semifinals ===
The fastest three hurdlers in each of the two heats advanced to the final round.

==== Semifinal 1 ====
Rank	Lane	Athlete	Nation	Time (hand)	Time (auto)	Notes
1	4	Willie May	United States	13.7	13.87	Q
2	6	Hayes Jones	United States	14.1	14.22	Q
3	2	Keith Gardner	British West Indies	14.2	14.32	Q
4	5	Nereo Svara	Italy	14.3	14.50	
5	3	Jean Baptiste Okello	Uganda	14.4	14.59	
6	1	Nikolay Berezutsky	Soviet Union	14.6	14.69	
				Wind: +0.1 m/s		

==== Semifinal 2 ====
Rank	Lane	Athlete	Nation	Time (hand)	Time (auto)	Notes
1	1	Lee Calhoun	United States	13.7	13.88	Q
2	4	Martin Lauer	United Team of Germany	14.0	14.13	Q
3	3	Valentin Chistyakov	Soviet Union	14.3	14.46	Q
4	5	Ghulam Raziq	Pakistan	14.3	14.49	
5	2	Stanko Lorger	Yugoslavia	14.5	14.83	
—	6	Anatoly Mikhaylov	Soviet Union	DNF		
				Wind: +0.1 m/s		

=== Final ===
Rank	Lane	Athlete	Nation	Time (hand)	Time (auto)
1st place, gold medalist(s)	2	Lee Calhoun	United States	13.8	13.98
2nd place, silver medalist(s)	1	Willie May	United States	13.8	13.99
3rd place, bronze medalist(s)	6	Hayes Jones	United States	14.0	14.17
4	3	Martin Lauer	United Team of Germany	14.0	14.20
5	4	Keith Gardner	British West Indies	14.4	14.55
6	5	Valentin Chistyakov	Soviet Union	14.6	14.71
				Wind: +0.1 m/s	
