= Athletics at the 1963 Summer Universiade – Men's 110 metres hurdles =

The men's 110 metres hurdles event at the 1963 Summer Universiade was held at the Estádio Olímpico Monumental in Porto Alegre on 5 September 1963.

== Medalists ==
Gold	Silver	Bronze
Anatoliy Mikhaylov; Soviet Union	Giorgio Mazza; Italy	Mike Hogan; Great Britain

== Results ==
=== Heats ===
Rank	Heat	Name	Nationality	Time	Notes
1	1	Anatoliy Mikhaylov	Soviet Union	14.08	Q
2	1	Mike Hogan	Great Britain	14.14	Q
3	1	Joaquim de Moraes	Brazil	16.5	
1	2	Bernard Fournet	France	14.45	Q
2	2	Klaus Willimczik	West Germany	14.49	Q
3	2	Carlos Luis Mossa	Brazil	14.85	
4	2	Katushiro Miyake	Japan	15.13	
1	3	Giorgio Mazza	Italy	14.51	Q
2	3	Gérard Fraysse	France	14.59	Q
3	3	Lázaro Betancourt	Cuba	14.73	

=== Final ===
Rank	Athlete	Nationality	Time	Notes
1st place, gold medalist(s)	Anatoliy Mikhaylov	Soviet Union	14.17	
2nd place, silver medalist(s)	Giorgio Mazza	Italy	14.25	
3rd place, bronze medalist(s)	Mike Hogan	Great Britain	14.40	
4	Bernard Fournet	France	14.44	
5	Klaus Willimczik	West Germany	14.50	
6	Gérard Fraysse	France	14.91	
