= Bezjak =

Bezjak is a South Slavic surname. Notable people with the surname include:

- Marko Bezjak (born 1986), Slovenian handball player
- Roman Bezjak (born 1989), Slovenian footballer
- Tatiana Bezjak (born 1971), Croatian sculptor and writer
- Zvonko Bezjak (1935–2022), Croatian hammer thrower
