= Yugoslavia at the 1963 Mediterranean Games =

- IOC code: YUG
- NOC: Yugoslav Olympic Committee

in Naples
- Medals Ranked 3rd: Gold 10 Silver 12 Bronze 11 Total 33

Mediterranean Games appearances (overview)
- 1951; 1955; 1959; 1963; 1967; 1971; 1975; 1979; 1983; 1987; 1991

Other related appearances
- Bosnia and Herzegovina (1993–pres.); Croatia (1993–pres.); Slovenia (1993–pres.); Serbia and Montenegro (1997–2005); Montenegro (2009–pres.); Serbia (2009–pres.); North Macedonia (2013–pres.); Kosovo (2018–pres.)

Yugoslavia competed at the 1963 Mediterranean Games held in Naples, Italy.

== Medalists ==
Medal	Name	Sport	Event
Gold	Roman Lešek	Athletics	Pole vault
Gold	Dako Radošević	Athletics	Discus throw
Gold	Zvonko Bezjak	Athletics	Hammer throw
Gold	Miroslav Cerar	Gymnastics	All-around
Gold	Miroslav Cerar	Gymnastics	Pommel horse
Gold	Mirko Štagljar, Ante Guberina, Mladen Valčić	Rowing	Coxed pair
Gold	Boro Jovanović, Nikola Pilić	Tennis	Men's Doubles
Gold	Volleyball team: Petar Bojić Branislav Bulatović Gordan Janković Vladimir Janković Mladen Kos Nikola Miković Stevan Pališaški Zoran Petrović Uroš Ribarić Zdenko Špet Josip Tomljanović Adolf Urnaut	Volleyball	Men's tournament
Gold	Branislav Martinović	Wrestling	Greco-Roman 70kg
Gold	Petar Cucić	Wrestling	Greco-Roman 87kg
Silver	Franc Červan	Athletics	10.000m
Silver	Dragan Anđelković	Athletics	High jump
Silver	Boško Tomasović	Athletics	Shot put
Silver	Branislav Mirković	Boxing	Flyweight
Silver	Vladimir Vranješević	Boxing	Light Middleweight
Silver	Miroslav Cerar, Alojz Petrovič, Tinček Šrot, Menčik Ivan Čaklec, Damir Anić	Gymnastics	Team all-around
Silver	Miroslav Cerar	Gymnastics	Floor
Silver	Miroslav Cerar	Gymnastics	Parallel bars
Silver	Miroslav Cerar	Gymnastics	Horizontal bar
Silver	Veljko Vrdoljak, Tonko Gabelić, Pavao Martić, Slavko Janjušević, Marko Mandić, Josip Sušić, Stjepan Mlinar, Jadran Barut, Sučurija Kahari	Rowing	Men's Eight
Silver	Veljko Rogošić	Swimming	400m Freestyle
Silver	Water polo team: Jani Barle Zoran Janković Milan Muškatirović Ante Nardeli Frane Novković Đuro Radan Vinko Rosić Mirko Sandić Božidar Stanišić Zlatko Šimenc Ivo Trumbić	Water polo	Men's tournament
Bronze	Vladimir Njaradi	Athletics	Triple jump
Bronze	Petar Barišić	Athletics	Shot put
Bronze	Basketball team: Eduard Bočkaj Vladimir Cvetković Dragutin Čermak Boris Križan Boris Lalić Z. Marković Bruno Marcelić Zvonko Petričević Ivan Potočnik Radovan Radović Željko Troskot Ratomir Vićentić	Basketball	Men's tournament
Bronze	Branislav Petrić	Boxing	Bantamweight
Bronze	Zvonimir Vujin	Boxing	Featherweight
Bronze	Srboljub Saratlić, Franc Peterman	Rowing	Double Sculls
Bronze	Miroslav Cerar	Gymnastics	Vault
Bronze	Veljko Rogošić	Swimming	1500m Freestyle
Bronze	Borislav Pavićević	Wrestling	Greco-Roman 97kg
Bronze	Boro Jovanović	Tennis	Men's singles
Bronze	Nikola Pilić	Tennis	Men's singles

== Medals by sport ==
Sport	Gold	Silver	Bronze	Total
Athletics	3	3	2	8
Gymnastics	2	4	1	7
Wrestling	2	0	1	3
Rowing	1	1	1	3
Tennis	1	0	2	3
Volleyball	1	0	0	1
Boxing	0	2	2	4
Swimming	0	1	1	2
Water polo	0	1	0	1
Basketball	0	0	1	1
Totals (10 entries)	10	12	11	33
