= 1966 European Indoor Games – Men's long jump =

The men's long jump event at the 1966 European Indoor Games was held on 27 March in Dortmund.

== Medalists ==
Gold	Silver	Bronze
Igor Ter-Ovanesyan; Soviet Union	Armin Baumert; West Germany	Jochen Eigenherr; West Germany

== Results ==
=== Qualification ===
Rank	Name	Nationality	#1	#2	#3	Result	Notes
1	Igor Ter-Ovanesyan	Soviet Union	x	7.67	–	7.67	q
2	Armin Baumert	West Germany	x	7.29	7.51	7.51	q
3	Jean Cochard	France	x	x	7.47	7.47	q
4	Jochen Eigenherr	West Germany	6.96	7.22	7.42	7.42	q
5	Hermann Latzel	West Germany	7.31	7.33	7.38	7.38	q
6	Luis Felipe Areta	Spain	7.29	x	7.35	7.35	q
7	Roberto Bonechi	Italy	x	7.10	7.30	7.30	
8	Dimitrios Maglaras	Greece	6.83	7.24	4.99	7.24	
9	Yves Theisen	Belgium	7.10	7.13	7.20	7.20	
10	Jacques Pani	France	7.14	7.15	7.14	7.15	
11	Walter Zuberbühler	Switzerland	x	6.80	6.87	6.87	

=== Final ===
Rank	Name	Nationality	#1	#2	#3	#4	#5	#6	Result	Notes
1st place, gold medalist(s)	Igor Ter-Ovanesyan	Soviet Union	x	8.00	x	8.04	8.23	8.14	8.23	WB
2nd place, silver medalist(s)	Armin Baumert	West Germany	x	x	x	x	7.69	7.79	7.79	
3rd place, bronze medalist(s)	Jochen Eigenherr	West Germany	7.46	7.60	7.37	7.63	x	5.76	7.63	
4	Luis Felipe Areta	Spain	7.51	x	7.37	7.30	7.39	7.52	7.52	
5	Jean Cochard	France	x	x	x	7.40	x	7.44	7.44	
6	Hermann Latzel	West Germany	7.43	7.36	x	7.32	7.29	x	7.43	
