= Mario Petri (rower) =

Italian rower

Personal information
- Born: 8 September 1939 (age 86) Trieste, Italy
- Height: 192 cm (6 ft 4 in)
- Weight: 87 kg (192 lb)

Sport
- Sport: Rowing
Medal record
Men's rowing
Representing Italy
European Rowing Championships
Gold medal – first place	1963 Copenhagen	Coxless pairs
Mediterranean Games
Gold medal – first place	1963 Naples	Coxless pairs

Mario Petri (born 8 September 1939 in Trieste) is a retired Italian Olympic rower.
