= Mosetti =

Mosetti is an Italian surname. Notable people with the surname include:

- Antonella Mosetti (born 1975), Italian showgirl, model and television presenter
- Paolo Mosetti (1939–2009), Italian Olympic rower
