= Bortolozzi =

Bortolozzi is a surname. Notable people with the surname include:

- Adriana Bortolozzi (born 1949), Argentine Justicialist Party politician
- Antonella Bortolozzi (born 1986), Argentine volleyball player
- Francesca Bortolozzi (born 1968), Italian fencer
- Giorgio Bortolozzi (born 1937), Italian athlete
