= 1962 European Athletics Championships – Men's 110 metres hurdles =

Men's 110 metres hurdles at the European Athletics Championships

The men's 110 metres hurdles at the 1962 European Athletics Championships was held in Belgrade, then Yugoslavia, at JNA Stadium on 13, 15, and 16 September 1962.

== Medalists ==
Gold	Anatoliy Mikhailov; Soviet Union
Silver	Giovanni Cornacchia; Italy
Bronze	Nikolay Berezutskiy; Soviet Union

== Results ==
=== Final ===
16 September Wind: -0.1 m/s

Rank	Name	Nationality	Time	Notes
1st place, gold medalist(s)	Anatoliy Mikhailov	Soviet Union	13.8	NR
2nd place, silver medalist(s)	Giovanni Cornacchia	Italy	14.0	
3rd place, bronze medalist(s)	Nikolay Berezutskiy	Soviet Union	14.2	
4	Michel Chardel	France	14.2	
5	Giorgio Mazza	Italy	14.3	
6	Valentin Chistyakov	Soviet Union	14.4	
7	Stanko Lorger	Yugoslavia	14.5	

=== Semi-finals ===
15 September

==== Semi-final 1 ====
Wind: -1.1 m/s

Rank	Name	Nationality	Time	Notes
1	Valentin Chistyakov	Soviet Union	14.3	Q
2	Giovanni Cornacchia	Italy	14.3	Q
3	Stanko Lorger	Yugoslavia	14.5	Q
3	Michel Chardel	France	14.5	Q
5	Bob Birrell	Great Britain	14.5	
6	Klaus Nüske	East Germany	14.5	
7	Klaus Schiess	Switzerland	15.0	

==== Semi-final 2 ====
Wind: -2.4 m/s

Rank	Name	Nationality	Time	Notes
1	Anatoliy Mikhailov	Soviet Union	14.1	Q
2	Nikolay Berezutskiy	Soviet Union	14.3	Q
3	Giorgio Mazza	Italy	14.3	Q
4	Laurie Taitt	Great Britain	14.4	
5	Wilfried Geeroms	Belgium	14.5	
6	Georgios Marsellos	Greece	14.9	

=== Heats ===
13 September

==== Heat 1 ====
Wind: 2.3 m/s

Rank	Name	Nationality	Time	Notes
1	Nikolay Berezutskiy	Soviet Union	14.2 w	Q
2	Valentin Chistyakov	Soviet Union	14.2 w	Q
3	Giorgio Mazza	Italy	14.3 w	Q
4	Klaus Nüske	East Germany	14.3 w	Q
5	Ivan Čierny	Czechoslovakia	14.6 w	

==== Heat 2 ====
Wind: 3.3 m/s

Rank	Name	Nationality	Time	Notes
1	Stanko Lorger	Yugoslavia	14.4 w	Q
2	Bob Birrell	Great Britain	14.4 w	Q
3	Klaus Schiess	Switzerland	14.7 w	Q
4	Hans-Werner Regenbrecht	East Germany	15.2 w	
5	Emilio Campra	Spain	15.4 w	
	Nereo Svara	Italy	DNF	
	Marcel Duriez	France	DNF	

==== Heat 3 ====
Wind: 3.4 m/s

Rank	Name	Nationality	Time	Notes
1	Anatoliy Mikhailov	Soviet Union	14.00 w	Q
2	Georgios Marsellos	Greece	14.20 w	Q
3	Wilfried Geeroms	Belgium	14.50 w	Q
4	Jiří Černošek	Czechoslovakia	14.70 w	

==== Heat 4 ====
Wind: 3.4 m/s

Rank	Name	Nationality	Time	Notes
1	Michel Chardel	France	14.00 w	Q
2	Laurie Taitt	Great Britain	14.00 w	Q
3	Giovanni Cornacchia	Italy	14.00 w	Q
4	Edward Bugała	Poland	14.40 w	
5	Milad Petrušić	Yugoslavia	14.60 w	
6	Herbert Stürmer	West Germany	14.60 w	
	Çetin Şahiner	Turkey	DQ	

== Participation ==
According to an unofficial count, 23 athletes from 14 countries participated in the event.

- Belgium (1)
- Czechoslovakia (2)
- East Germany (2)
- France (2)
- Greece (1)
- Italy (3)
- Poland (1)
- Soviet Union (3)
- Spain (1)
- Switzerland (1)
- Turkey (1)
- Great Britain (2)
- West Germany (1)
- Yugoslavia (2)
