= Athletics at the 1959 Summer Universiade – Men's hammer throw =

The men's hammer throw event at the 1959 Summer Universiade was held at the Stadio Comunale di Torino in Turin on 3 and 4 September 1959.

== Medalists ==
Gold	Silver	Bronze
Gyula Zsivótzky; Hungary	Anatoliy Samotsvetov; Soviet Union	Krešimir Račić; Yugoslavia

== Results ==
=== Qualification ===
Rank	Athlete	Nationality	Result	Notes
1	Gyula Zsivótzky	Hungary	60.97	
2	Anatoliy Samotsvetov	Soviet Union	60.64	
3	Krešimir Račić	Yugoslavia	59.50	
4	Zvonko Bezjak	Yugoslavia	57.67	
5	Einoshin Hanamura	Japan	54.49	
6	Howard Payne	Southern Rhodesia	53.34	
7	Siegfried Perleberg	West Germany	52.39	
8	Manlio Cristin	Italy	50.77	
9	Rim Dong-sil	South Korea	48.38	
10	Luciano Ansaloni	Italy	48.06	
11	Norbert Göpfert	West Germany	48.02	
12	José María Elorriaga	Spain	48.02	

=== Final ===
Rank	Name	Nationality	Result	Notes
1st place, gold medalist(s)	Gyula Zsivótzky	Hungary	63.65	
2nd place, silver medalist(s)	Anatoliy Samotsvetov	Soviet Union	63.61	
3rd place, bronze medalist(s)	Krešimir Račić	Yugoslavia	62.32	
4	Zvonko Bezjak	Yugoslavia	61.74	
5	Siegfried Perleberg	West Germany	57.81	
6	Howard Payne	Southern Rhodesia	57.39	
7	Manlio Cristin	Italy	55.91	
8	Einoshin Hanamura	Japan	55.39	
9	Norbert Göpfert	West Germany	53.99	
10	Rim Dong-sil	South Korea	49.44	
11	José María Elorriaga	Spain	48.66	
12	Luciano Ansaloni	Italy	47.48	
