= Manlio Cristin =

Italian hammer thrower (1936–1997)

Personal information
- Full name: Manlio Veniero Cristin
- National team: Italy: 14 caps (1959-1964)
- Born: 18 January 1936 Tempio Pausania, Italy
- Died: 1997 (aged 60–61) ?

Sport
- Sport: Athletics
- Event: Hammer throw
- Club: Cus Pisa (1959-1960); C.S. Esercito (1961-1963); Libertas La Spezia (1964-1965)

Achievements and titles
- Personal best: Hammer throw: 61.96 m (1961)

Manlio Cristin (18 January 1936 - 1997) was an Italian hammer thrower.

Cristin, Sardinian, but Ligurian by adoption, has set the national record of the hammer throw in 1961, a record that lasted for six years.

== National records ==
- Hammer throw: 61,96 m (Palermo, 7 October 1961) - record holder until 6 May 1967.

== Achievements ==
Year	Competition	Venue	Rank	Event	Measure	Notes
1959	Universiade	(Italy) Turin	7th	Hammer throw	55.91 m	
1963	Mediterranean Games	(Italy) Naples	4th	Hammer throw	56.70 m	

== National titles ==
Cristin won three national championships at individual senior level.

- Italian Athletics Championships
  - Hammer throw: 1959, 1961, 1964 (3)
