= Roman Muzyk =

Polish hurdler

Personal information
- Full name: Roman Stanisław Muzyk
- Nationality: Polish
- Born: 28 February 1938 Kraków, Poland
- Died: 24 September 2003 (aged 65) Kraków, Poland
- Height: 1.87 m (6 ft 2 in)
- Weight: 83 kg (183 lb)

Sport
- Sport: Track and field
- Event: 110 metres hurdles
- Club: Wisła Kraków

Roman Stanisław Muzyk (28 February 1938 – 24 September 2003) was a Polish hurdler. He competed in the men's 110 metres hurdles at the 1960 Summer Olympics.

== International competitions ==
Year	Competition	Venue	Position	Event	Notes
Representing Poland
1960	Olympic Games	Rome, Italy	14th (qf)	110 m hurdles	14.68

== Personal bests ==
- 200 metres – 22.1h (Jelenia Góra 1961)
- 110 metres hurdles – 14.1h (Łódź 1961)
- 110 metres hurdles – 14.68 (Rome 1960)
- 400 metres hurdles – 54.2h (Bydgoszcz 1958)
