= Daniel Touche =

French gymnast

- Born: 16 July 1939 (age 87) Versailles, France
- Height: 1.62 m (5 ft 4 in)

Gymnastics career
- Discipline: Men's artistic gymnastics
- Country represented: France
Medal record
Men's artistic gymnastics
Representing France
Mediterranean Games
| Bronze medal – third place | 1963 Napoli | Team |

Daniel Touche (born 16 July 1939) is a French gymnast. He competed in eight events at the 1960 Summer Olympics.
