= Christian Guiffroy =

French gymnast

- Born: 21 January 1941 (age 85) Toulouse, France
- Height: 1.68 m (5 ft 6 in)

Gymnastics career
- Discipline: Men's artistic gymnastics
- Country represented: France
Medal record
Men's artistic gymnastics
Representing France
Mediterranean Games
Bronze medal – third place	1963 Napoli	Team
Bronze medal – third place	1963 Napoli	Horizontal bar

Christian Guiffroy (born 21 January 1941) is a French gymnast. He competed at the 1964 Summer Olympics, the 1968 Summer Olympics and the 1972 Summer Olympics.
