= Karl-Ernst Schottes =

German hurdler

Personal information
- Nationality: German
- Born: 21 April 1935 (age 91)

Sport
- Sport: Track and field
- Event: 110 metres hurdles

Karl-Ernst Schottes (born 21 April 1935) is a German hurdler. He competed in the men's 110 metres hurdles at the 1960 Summer Olympics.
