= Mauro Bogliatto =

Italian high jumper

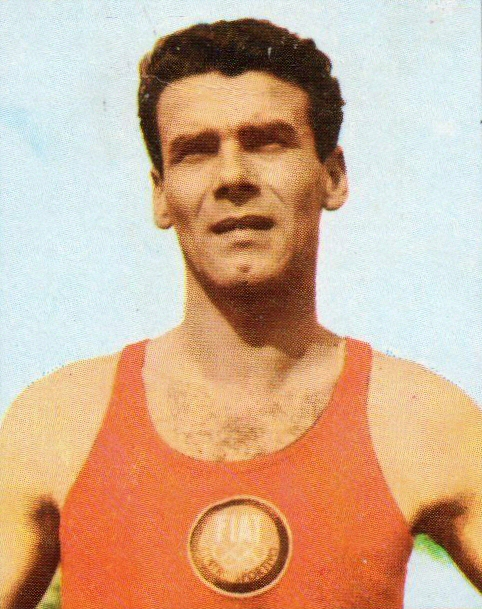
- Mauro Bogliatto in 1966

Personal information
- Nationality: Italian
- Born: 24 February 1943 (age 83) Ala di Stura, Italy
- Height: 1.88 m (6 ft 2 in)
- Weight: 76 kg (168 lb)

Sport
- Country: Italy
- Sport: Athletics
- Event: High jump
- Club: C.S. Aeronautica Militare

Achievements and titles
- Personal best: High jump: 2.10 m (1965)
Medal record
Summer Universiade
Silver medal – second place	1963 Porto Alegre	High jump
Mediterranean Games
Gold medal – first place	1963 Naples	High jump

Mauro Bogliatto (born 24 February 1943) is a former Italian high jumper.

== Biography ==
Bogliatto was born in Ala di Stura. He won two medals, at senior level, at the International athletics competitions. He finished 16th at the 1964 Olympic Games, he has 12 caps in national team from 1963 to 1966.

== See also ==
- Men's high jump Italian record progression
- Italy at the 1963 Mediterranean Games
