= Saka Oloko =

Nigerian hurdler and former fastest man in Nigeria

Personal information
- Nationality: Nigerian
- Born: 10 May 1936 Lagos Island
- Height: 6 ft (183 cm)
- Weight: 75 kg (165 lb)

Sport
- Sport: Track and field
- Event: 110 metres hurdles

Saka Akanni Oloko (born 10 May 1936) was a Nigerian hurdler. He competed in the men's 110 metres hurdles at the 1960 Summer Olympics.
