= Isaac Elie =

Sudanese hurdler (1928–1999)

Personal information
- Nationality: Sudanese
- Born: 24 November 1928 Bor, Anglo-Egyptian Sudan (now South Sudan)
- Died: 1999

Sport
- Sport: Track and field
- Event: 110 metres hurdles

Isaac Elie (24 November 1928 – 1999) was a Sudanese hurdler. He competed in the men's 110 metres hurdles at the 1960 Summer Olympics.
