= Jacques Déprez =

French hurdler (1938–2020)

Personal information
- Nationality: French
- Born: 3 March 1938
- Died: 20 November 2020 (aged 82)

Sport
- Sport: Track and field
- Event: 110 metres hurdles

Jacques Déprez (3 March 1938 – 20 November 2020) was a French hurdler. He competed in the men's 110 metres hurdles at the 1960 Summer Olympics.
