= Bob Birrell =

British hurdler (1938–2024)

Personal information
- Nationality: British (English)
- Born: 6 March 1938 Barrow-in-Furness, Lancashire, England
- Died: 21 March 2024 (aged 86)
- Height: 192 cm (6 ft 4 in)
- Weight: 92 kg (203 lb)

Sport
- Sport: Track and field
- Event: 110 metres hurdles
- Club: Barrow Athletic Club; Liverpool Harriers; Birchfield Harriers

Joseph Robert Birrell (6 March 1938 – 21 March 2024) was a British sprint hurdler and coach, who competed at the 1960 Summer Olympics.

== Early life and education ==
Birrell was from Roose, in Barrow-in-Furness. After attending Barrow Grammar School on scholarship, he went to Manchester University. He started running in childhood and competed for Barrow AC and at university, initially as a sprinter, then in the hurdles and other field events. At 18 he became Northern junior champion in discus.

== Athletics career ==
Birrell was a seven times winner of the Northern Counties senior 120 yards hurdles, and at the 1958 British Empire and Commonwealth Games, representing England, reached the semi-final of the 120 yards hurdles with a time of 15 seconds.

Birrell finished third behind Ghulam Raziq in the 120 yards event at the 1960 AAA Championships. Later that year, he represented Great Britain in the men's 110 metres hurdles at the 1960 Summer Olympics in Rome.

Birrell finished runner-up behind Nereo Svara at the 1961 AAA Championships but by virtue of being the highest placed British athlete was considered the British 120 yards hurdles champion.

In 1961, Birrell won the 'City of Hull' trophy for the best performance at the Northern Counties championships and set a Commonwealth record of 14 seconds at a September meet-up between the Amateur Athletic Association of England, the Universities Athletic Union and the Combined Services. He placed sixth in the 120 yards hurdles at the 1962 British Empire and Commonwealth Games. He also competed for Great Britain in the men's 110 metres hurdles at the 1962 European Athletics Championships in Belgrade, where he narrowly missed qualifying for the finals. He missed much of the 1963 season due to injury and was not selected for the 1964 Summer Olympics in Tokyo or the 1968 Summer Olympics in Mexico City.

Birrell joined Liverpool Harriers in 1965, setting a club record for the sprint hurdles that had not been overturned by his death. He retired from competition the following year but nonetheless won the Northern Counties sprint hurdles every year in 1966–1969, and raced in Uganda twice in the late 1960s, the second time beating a 19-year-old John Akii-Bua at the Ugandan Athletics Championships.

== Coaching and personal life ==
In 1962, Birrell became a physical education and chemistry teacher at Birkenhead School. He also coached and became the UK junior track and field team manager, in the latter role coaching Steve Smith, Curtis Robb, and Diane Allahgreen. He served as president and secretary of the Lancashire Men's Athletic Association and was elected president of Liverpool Harriers in 2003. He died on 21 March 2024 at the age of 86, after a fall.

Joe Birrell was his older brother.
