= Bernard Fauqueux =

French gymnast

- Full name: Bernard Jean Marcel Fauqueux
- Born: 2 September 1938 Vernon, France
- Died: 1 June 1989 (aged 50) Lisieux, France
- Height: 1.66 m (5 ft 5 in)

Gymnastics career
- Discipline: Men's artistic gymnastics
- Country represented: France
Medal record
Men's artistic gymnastics
Representing France
Mediterranean Games
Bronze medal – third place	1963 Napoli	Team

Bernard Jean Marcel Fauqueux (2 September 1938 – 1 June 1989) was a French gymnast. He competed at the 1960 Summer Olympics and the 1964 Summer Olympics.
