= Mykola Berezutskiy =

Ukrainian hurdler (born 1937)

Personal information
- Nationality: Ukrainian
- Born: 22 March 1937
- Died: 20 December 2022 (aged 85)

Sport
- Sport: Track and field
- Event: 110 metres hurdles
Medal record
Men's athletics
Representing Soviet Union
European Championships
| Bronze medal – third place | 1962 Belgrade | 110 m hurdles |

Mykola Berezutskiy (22 March 1937 – 20 December 2022) was a Ukrainian hurdler. He competed in the men's 110 metres hurdles at the 1960 Summer Olympics representing the Soviet Union.
