= Paolo Mosetti =

Italian rower

Personal information
- Born: 29 January 1939 Trieste, Italy
- Died: 17 February 2009 (aged 70)
- Height: 189 cm (6 ft 2 in)
- Weight: 78 kg (172 lb)

Sport
- Sport: Rowing
Medal record
Men's rowing
Representing Italy
European Rowing Championships
| Gold medal – first place | 1963 Copenhagen | Coxless pairs |
Mediterranean Games
| Gold medal – first place | 1963 Naples | Coxless pairs |

Paolo Mosetti (29 January 1939 – 17 February 2009) was an Italian Olympic rower.
