= Jean Pommat =

French swimmer

Personal information
- Born: August 30, 1944 Aubervilliers, France
- Died: March 24, 2006 (aged 61)

Sport
- Sport: Swimming
Medal record
Representing France
Mediterranean Games
Gold medal – first place	1963 Naples	4x200m freestyle relay

Jean Pommat (30 August 1944 – 24 March 2006) was a French freestyle swimmer who competed in the 1960 Summer Olympics. He was born in Aubervilliers.
