= Jean-Pierre Boccardo =

French sprinter (1942–2019)

Personal information
- Born: 16 March 1942 Espéraza, Aude, France
- Died: 29 January 2019 (aged 76) Lavaur, Tarn, France

Sport
- Sport: Track and field
Medal record
Representing France
Mediterranean Games
Gold medal – first place	1963 Naples	4x400m relay
Bronze medal – third place	1963 Naples	400m

Jean-Pierre Boccardo (16 March 1942 – 29 January 2019) was a French sprinter, born in Espéraza, who competed in the 1964 Summer Olympics and in the 1968 Summer Olympics.

He won the 4x400m relay at the 1963 Mediterranean Games and finished third in the individual 400m.
