= Joe Birrell =

British hurdler (1930–2024)

Personal information
- Nationality: British (English)
- Born: 11 March 1930 Cockermouth, England
- Died: 19 November 2024 (aged 94) Norwich, England

Sport
- Sport: Track and field
- Event: 110 metres hurdles
- Club: Barrow Grammar School

Joseph Robert Birrell (11 March 1930 – 19 November 2024) was a British hurdler who competed at the 1948 Summer Olympics.

== Biography ==
Birrell was born in Cockermouth, England, on 11 March 1930. He was educated at Barrow Grammar School and gained significant success as a junior, winning the junior AAA title in 1947.

Birrell became the British 120 yards hurdles champion after winning the British AAA Championships title at the 1948 AAA Championships.

Shortly after the AAAs, Birrell represented the Great Britain team at the 1948 Olympic Games in London, when aged 18. He competed in the men's 110 metres hurdles, finishing 4th in heat three.

Birrell finished third behind Don Finlay at the 1949 AAA Championships and completed his national service in the army until 1950. He went to Loughborough College in September 1950.

Birrell's younger brother Bob went to the 1960 Summer Olympics.

Birrell died on 19 November 2024, at the age of 94. He was survived by his wife, Marjory, and their three daughters.
