= Klaus Gerbig =

German hurdler

Personal information
- Nationality: German
- Born: 6 May 1939
- Died: 20 June 1992 (aged 53)

Sport
- Sport: Track and field
- Event: 110 metres hurdles

Klaus Gerbig (6 May 1939 – 20 June 1992) was a German hurdler. He competed in the men's 110 metres hurdles at the 1960 Summer Olympics.
