= Vittoriano Drovandi =

Italian former high jumper

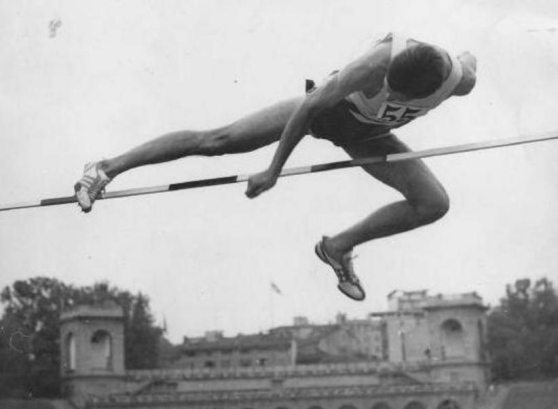
- Drovandi in 1960s.

Personal information
- National team: Italy: 9 (1957-1970)
- Born: 27 April 1941 San Giuliano Terme, Italy
- Died: 1 July 2013 (aged 72) Livorno, Italy

Sport
- Sport: Athletics
- Event: High jump
- Club: Carabinieri Bologna

Achievements and titles
- Personal best: 2.10 m (1966)

Vittoriano Drovandi (27 April 1941 - 2 July 2013) was an Italian high jumper and athletics coach.

== Career ==
Three-time national champion at senior level in high jump from 1964 to 1967, boasts 9 caps in the Italy national athletics team.

In his hometown, Livorno, a high jump meeting is named after him, which has been held annually since 2014.

== National titles ==
Drovandi won three national championships at individual senior level.

- Italian Athletics Championships
  - High jump: 1964, 1965, 1967
