= Gérard Mathieu =

Belgian politician (1947–2026)

Member of the Parliament of Wallonia
- In office 1995–2004

Personal details
- Born: 21 September 1947 Habay, Belgium
- Died: 16 February 2026 (aged 78) Arlon, Belgium
- Party: MR
- Education: Université libre de Bruxelles (Lic.)
- Occupation: Schoolteacher

Gérard Mathieu (21 September 1947 – 16 February 2026) was a Belgian politician of the Reformist Movement (MR).

== Life and career ==
A Latin and Greek secondary school teacher, he served in the Parliament of Wallonia from 1995 to 2004.

Mathieu died in Arlon on 16 February 2026, at the age of 78.
