= Tatiana Bezjak =

Croatian sculptor and author

Tatiana Bezjak (/ˈbæzjɑːk/; born Tatjana Bezjak; August 3, 1971 in Zagreb Croatia), is a Croatian sculptor and writer. She has written essays on art and in 2013 published the novel X which among several themes, explores the obstacles a woman navigates in the contemporary art world.

Tatiana Bezjak graduated from the School of Applied Arts and Design. Following this, she also graduated as a sculpture at the Academy of Fine Arts at the University of Zagreb. She lives in Zagreb and works as an independent artist.

== Career ==
Since 1992 she exhibits in Croatia and abroad. Her work has been commissioned for public spaces in Croatia including the Croatian Academy of Sciences and Arts Philological Institute.

Published by Durieux in 2013 her novel X with themes ranging from love, over symbolism in art and in nature, through the friction a woman artist is often facing in contemporary society. Art critic Nađa Bobičić nevertheless reminds us of the struggle towards the end, at which point the reader is awarded with an ending devoid of naivete, one which is full of optimism, one which reminds us of the cycles of creation and renewal.

In the novel, Tatjana Bezjak is also concerned with the unenviable position of independent artists, especially artists who in this country, with more or less passion, struggle for survival.

She continues to exhibit in Croatia and abroad. Her work on the fractal nature of sculpture explores spatial calligraphy using wire as the medium but also using nature and its fractal patterns as the point of origin for her work in the second decade of the 21st century.
