= Ennio Boschini =

Italian hammer thrower (1940–2009)

Personal information
- National team: Italy: 11 caps (1960-1964)
- Born: 1 July 1940 Monfalcone, Italy
- Died: April 11, 2009 (aged 68) Padua, Italy

Sport
- Sport: Athletics
- Event: Hammer throw
- Club: G.S. Fiamme Oro

Achievements and titles
- Personal best: Hammer throw: 60.71 m (1963)
Medal record
Mediterranean Games
Bronze medal – third place	1963 Naples	Hammer throw

Ennio Boschini (1 July 1940 - 11 April 2009) was an Italian hammer thrower.

== Achievements ==
Year	Competition	Venue	Rank	Event	Measure	Notes
1963	Mediterranean Games	(Italy) Naples	3rd	Hammer throw	59.70 m	

== National titles ==
Boschini won three national championships at individual senior level.

- Italian Athletics Championships
  - Hammer throw: 1960, 1962, 1963 (3)

== See also ==
- Italy at the 1963 Mediterranean Games
