= Vanni Rodeghiero =

Italian javelin thrower

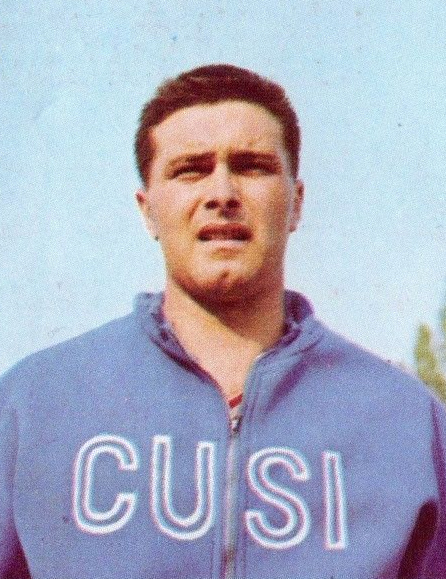

Personal information
- Full name: Giovanni Rodeghiero
- Born: 9 February 1942 (age 84)

Sport
- Sport: Athletics
- Event: Javelin throw

Achievements and titles
- Personal best: 78.82 m (26 September 1965, Naples)
Medal record
Representing Italy
Summer Universiade
Silver medal – second place	1965 Budapest	Javelin throw
Mediterranean Games
Bronze medal – third place	1963 Naples	Javelin throw

Vanni Rodeghiero (born 9 February 1942) is a retired Italian javelin thrower who won a silver medal at the 1965 Summer Universiade and a bronze medal at the 1963 Mediterranean Games.

== Biography ==
He winning the national title in 1963, 1965, 1966, 1968, 1974, 1978 and 1980, and after the end of his senior athletics career he continued to compete in masters athletics.

== Achievements ==
Masters

Year	Competition	Venue	Event	Position	Measure	Notes
1998	European Veterans Championships	(Italy) Cesenatico	Javelin throw M55	1st	56.30 m	

== National titles ==
Rodeghiero won 7 national championships at individual senior level.

- Italian Athletics Championships
  - Javelin throw: 1963, 1965, 1966, 1968, 1974, 1978, 1980 (7)

== See also ==
- List of Italian records in masters athletics
