= Jean Baptiste Okello =

Ugandan athlete

Personal information
- Nationality: Ugandan
- Born: 10 April 1940 (age 86) Lira, Uganda

Sport
- Sport: Athletics
- Events: 110 metres hurdles, 4 × 100 metres relay

Jean Baptiste Okello (born 10 April 1940) is a former athlete, who was born in Lira, Northern Region, Uganda. Competing for Uganda at the 1960 Summer Olympics, he reached the semi-final of the 110 metres Hurdles, and was part of the 4 × 100 metres relay squad.

== Career ==
Okello rose to prominence in Uganda's athletic scene during the late 1950s as a leading 110 metres hurdler. He achieved a personal best of 14.48 seconds in the 110 metres hurdles at the 1960 Olympics. Okello retired from competitive athletics in early 1960's.
