= Luis Felipe Areta =

Spanish triple jumper

Personal information
- Born: 28 March 1942 (age 84) San Sebastián, Guipúzcoa, Spain

Sport
- Sport: Track and field
Medal record
Representing Spain
European Indoor Championships
Bronze medal – third place	1968 Madrid	Triple jump
Mediterranean Games
Gold medal – first place	1963 Naples	Long jump
Gold medal – first place	1963 Naples	Triple jump
Gold medal – first place	1967 Tunis	Triple jump
Summer Universiade
Bronze medal – third place	1963 Porto Alegre	Triple jump

Luis Felipe Areta Sampériz (born 28 March 1942) is a retired Spanish triple jumper.

His personal best jump was 16.36 metres, achieved in July 1968 in Stockholm. He had a better indoor mark with 16.47 metres, achieved at the 1968 European Indoor Games in Madrid. Both marks are former Spanish records.

He is a numerary of Opus Dei from October 1959. Ordained priest in 1980, lives in Bilbao.

== International competitions ==
Year	Competition	Venue	Position	Event	Notes
Representing Spain
1963	Mediterranean Games	Naples, Italy	1st	Long jump	
1963	Mediterranean Games	Naples, Italy	1st	Triple jump	
1964	Olympic Games	Tokyo, Japan	6th	Long jump	
1967	Mediterranean Games	Tunis, Tunisia	1st	Triple jump	
1968	European Indoor Games	Madrid, Spain	3rd	Triple jump	16.47 m = NRi
1971	European Indoor Championships	Sofia, Bulgaria	5th	Triple jump	
