= Paolo Zamboni (athlete) =

Personal information
- Nationality: Italian
- Born: 28 October 1939 Bologna
- Died: 19 November 1969 (aged 30)

Sport
- Country: Italy
- Sport: Athletics
- Event: 110 metres hurdles
Medal record
World Race Walking Cup
Bronze medal – third place	1961 Lugano	Combined Team

Paolo Zamboni (18 May 1939 – 19 November 1969) was an Italian male hurdler who competed at the 1960 Summer Olympics.
