= Raffaele Piras =

Italian long jumper (1942–2014)

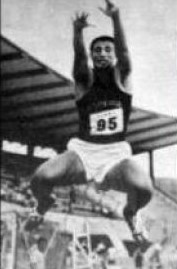

Personal information
- National team: Italy: 5 (1961–1963)
- Born: 26 August 1942 (age 83) Quartucciu, Italy
- Died: 4 December 2014 (aged 72) Cagliari, Italy

Sport
- Sport: Athletics
- Event: Long jump
- Club: Carabinieri Bologna

Achievements and titles
- Personal best: Long jump: 7.60 m (1963)

Raffaele Piras (26 August 1942 – 4 December 2014) was an Italian long jumper.

== Achievements ==
Year	Competition	Venue	Rank	Event	Measure	Notes
1963	Mediterranean Games	(Italy) Naples	6th	Long jump	7.28 m	

== Career ==
Two-time national champion at senior level in long jump in 1961 and 1963.
