= Bouchaib El-Maachi =

Moroccan sprinter

Personal information
- Full name: Embark Bouchaib El-Maachi
- Nationality: Moroccan
- Born: 1943 Azemmour, Morocco
- Died: 1987 (aged 43–44)

Sport
- Sport: Sprinting
- Event: 100 metres

Embark Bouchaib El-Maachi (1943 – 1987) was a Moroccan sprinter. He competed in the 100 metres at the 1960 Summer Olympics and the 1964 Summer Olympics.
