= Wolfgang Klein =

German long jumper (1941–2017)

Personal information
- Nationality: German
- Born: 28 January 1941 Hanover, Germany
- Died: 15 September 2017 (aged 76) Hamburg, Germany

Sport
- Sport: Track and field
- Event: Long jump
Medal record
Representing West Germany
Summer Universiade
Silver medal – second place	1963 Porto Alegre	Long jump

Wolfgang Klein (28 January 1941 – 15 September 2017) was a German athlete. He competed in the men's long jump at the 1964 Summer Olympics. He later became a lawyer and served as the president of the football club Hamburger SV between 1979 and 1987.
