= Guy Husson =

French hammer thrower (1931–2025)

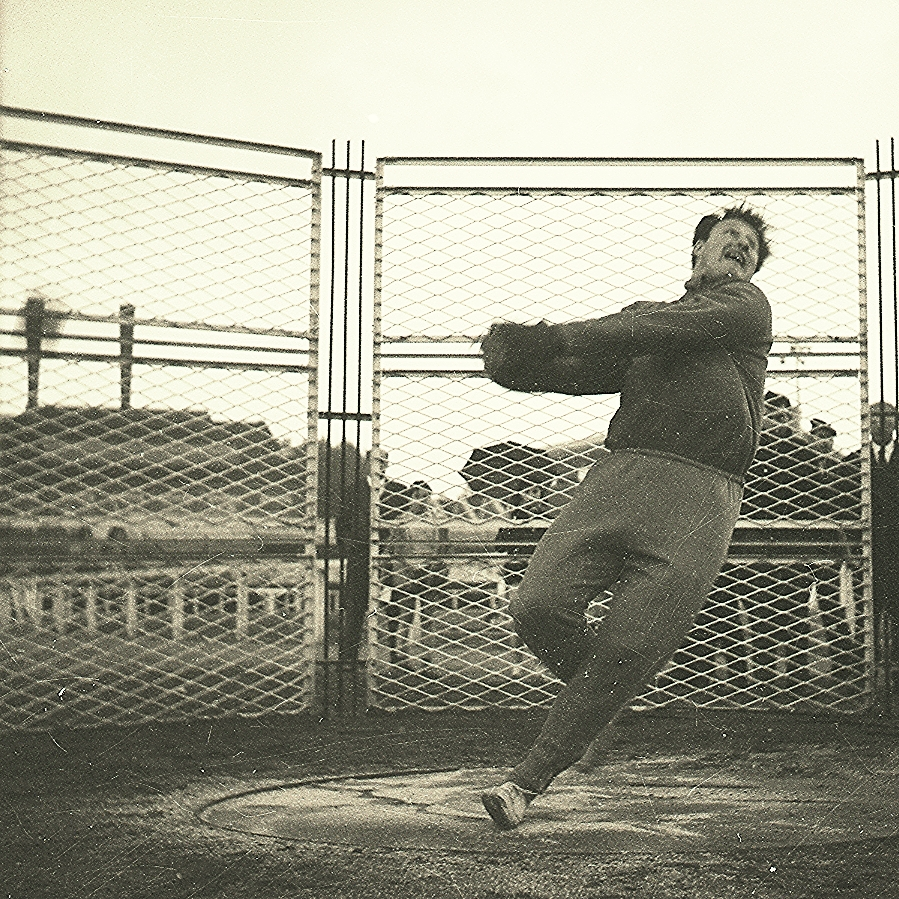
Guy Husson (1962)

Guy Husson (2 March 1931 – 18 June 2025) was a French track and field athlete known primarily for the hammer throw.

== Biography ==
Husson was born in Vitry-sur-Seine, Val-de-Marne, France on 2 March 1931. He represented his native country in three Olympics from 1956 to 1964. He was a finalist in 1956, finishing in 13th place. He also represented France at the 1954 and 1958 European Athletics Championships; and the 1955 and 1963 Mediterranean Games.

He set his personal best of 69.40 at a home meet in Aix-les-Bains at the age of 36. The throw turned out to be a Masters M35 World Record, which stood for almost two years until it was surpassed by the same Hal Connolly who had taken the gold medal in 1956. Such was the improvement in the event, Husson's throw was more than 6 meters further than Connolly's Olympic winning throw (and Olympic record) 11 years earlier.

Husson died on 18 June 2025 in Aix-les-Bains, at the age of 94.
