= Armando Sardi =

Italian sprinter (1940–2023)

Personal information
- Nationality: Italian
- Born: 15 September 1940 Monza, Italy
- Died: 22 December 2023 (aged 83)
- Height: 1.74 m (5 ft 8 1/2 in)
- Weight: 72 kg (159 lb)

Sport
- Country: Italy
- Sport: Athletics
- Event: Sprint
- Club: Atletica Riccardi

Achievements and titles
- Personal bests: 100 m: 10.4 (1962); 200 m: 20.8 (1961)
Medal record
Mediterranean Games
Gold medal – first place	1963 Naples	4 x 100 m relay
Silver medal – second place	1963 Naples	200 metres

Armando Sardi (15 September 1940 – 22 December 2023) was an Italian sprinter who competed in the 1960 Summer Olympics. Sardi died on 22 December 2023, at the age of 83.

== Olympic results ==
Year	Competition	Venue	Position	Event	Performance	Note
1960	Olympic Games	(Italy) Rome	4th	4 × 100 m relay	40.33	
1960	Olympic Games	(Italy) Rome	Heat	200 metres	21.6	

== National titles ==
In the Livio Berruti's Era, Armando Sardi has won just one time the individual national championship.

- 1 win in the 200 metres (1963)

== See also ==
- Italy national relay team
