= Pierluigi Gatti =

Italian triple jumper

Personal information
- Nationality: Italian
- Born: 29 March 1938 (age 88) Oneglia, Italy
- Height: 1.74 m (5 ft 9 in)
- Weight: 76 kg (168 lb)

Sport
- Country: Italy
- Sport: Athletics
- Event: Triple jump

Pierluigi Gatti (born 29 March 1938) is a former Italian triple jumper who competed at the 1960 Summer Olympics.
