= Michel Hiblot =

French sprinter

Michel Hiblot (born 19 April 1943) is a French former sprinter who competed in the 1964 Summer Olympics.
