= Franco Grossi =

Italian discus thrower

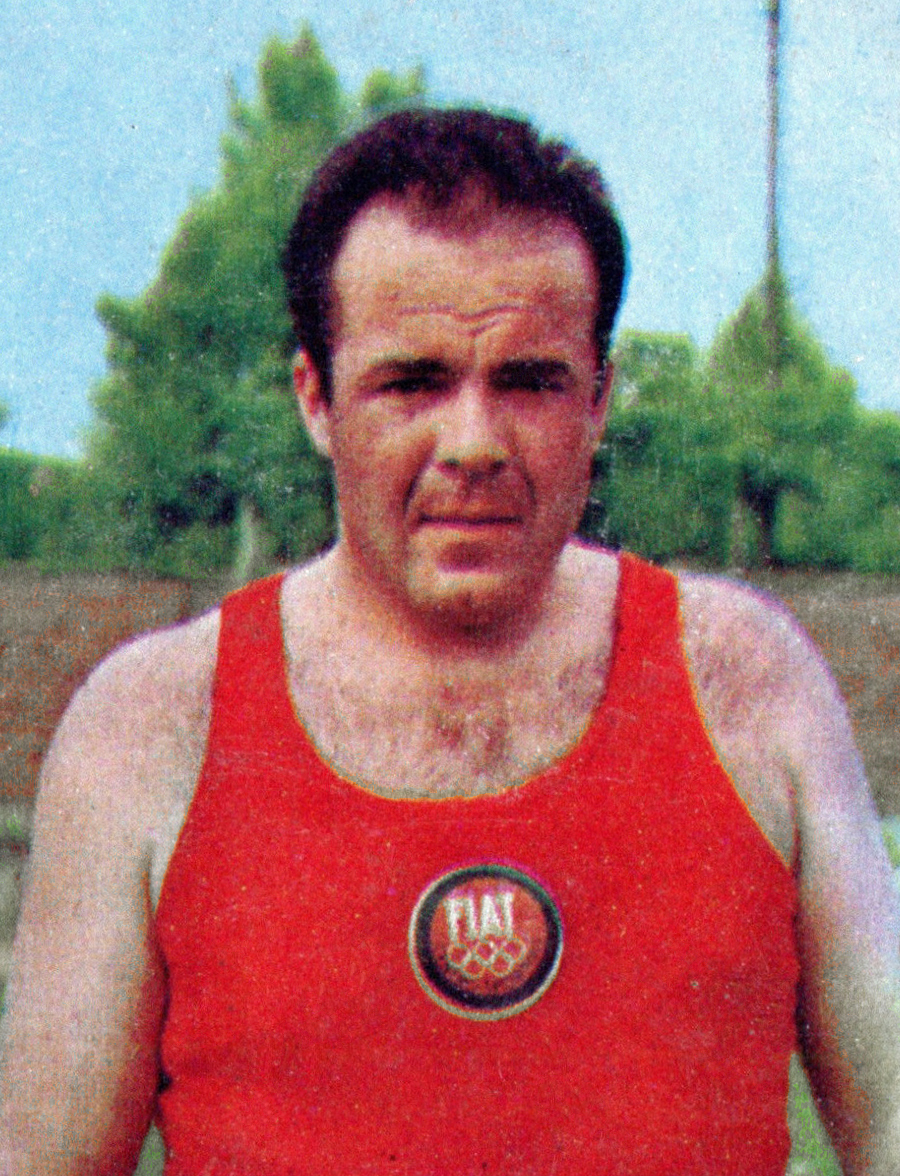

Personal information
- Born: 4 January 1939 (age 87) Serravalle, Italy
- Height: 1.85 m (6 ft 1 in)
- Weight: 100 kg (220 lb)

Sport
- Sport: Athletics
- Event: Discus throw
- Club: FIAT Torino

Achievements and titles
- Personal best: 56.26 m (1967)
Medal record
Representing Italy
Mediterranean Games
Bronze medal – third place	1963 Naples	Discus throw

Franco Grossi (born 4 January 1939) is a retired Italian discus thrower who won a bronze medal at the 1963 Mediterranean Games. He competed at the 1960 Olympics and finished in 29th place.
