= Ante Guberina =

Croatian rower

Personal information
- Nationality: Croatian
- Born: 24 February 1940 (age 85); Šibenik, Yugoslavia

Sport
- Sport: Rowing

Ante Guberina (born 24 February 1940) is a Croatian rower. He competed in the men's coxed pair event at the 1964 Summer Olympics.
