= Osvalda Giardi =

Italian high jumper and pentathlete (1932–2019)

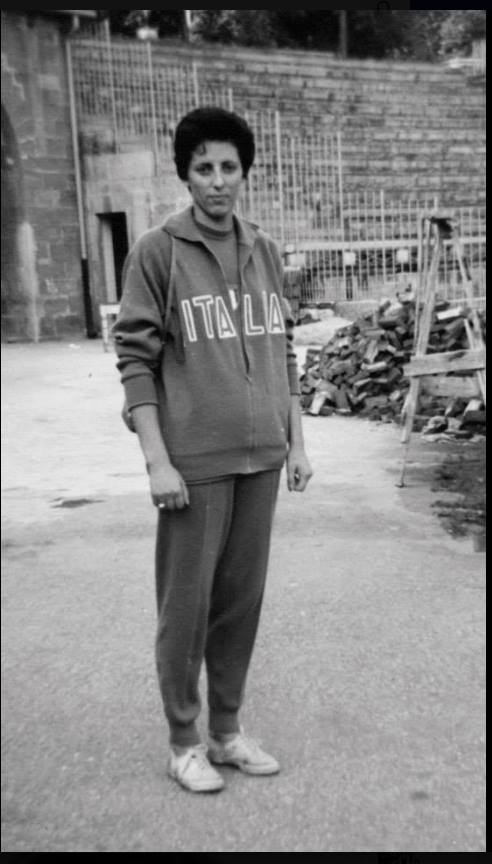
- Ciardi in 1950s

Personal information
- National team: Italy: 23 (1954-1966)
- Born: 19 December 1932 Pisa, Italy
- Died: 1 July 2019 (aged 86)

Sport
- Country: Italy
- Sport: Athletics
- Event(s): High jump Pentathlon
- Club: Cus Pisa

Achievements and titles
- Personal bests: High jump: 1.67 m (1962); Pentathlon: 3890 pt (1964)

Osvalda Giardi (19 December 1932 – 1 July 2019) was an Italian high jumper and pentathlete.

She won 10 titles at the Italian national championship, and was ranked at number 25 on the IAAF world leading list in 1957, with 1.63 m established in Bologna on 14 September.

== Biography ==
Osvalda Giardi had a twelve year long career, appearing 23 times for the Italian national team from 1954 to 1966.

== National records ==
- High jump: 1.67 m ( (Italy) Bergamo, 23 September 1962) - holder until 28 June 1969

== National titles ==
- 8 wins in High jump (1954, 1956, 1957, 1958, 1960, 1962, 1964, 1966)
- 2 wins in Pentathlon (1956, 1964)

== See also ==
- Women's high jump Italian record progression
