= François Châtelet (athlete) =

French middle-distance runner

Personal information
- Nationality: French
- Born: 27 February 1939 (age 87)

Sport
- Sport: Middle-distance running
- Event: 800 metres

François Châtelet (born 27 February 1939) is a French middle-distance runner. He competed in the men's 800 metres at the 1964 Summer Olympics.
