= Bernard Fournet =

French hurdler

Personal information
- Nationality: French
- Born: 13 November 1941 (age 84) Dreux, France

Sport
- Sport: Track and field
- Event: 110 metres hurdles

Bernard Fournet (born 13 November 1941) is a French hurdler. He competed in the men's 110 metres hurdles at the 1964 Summer Olympics.
