= Zvonko Bezjak =

Croatian-Yugoslav hammer thrower (1935–2022)

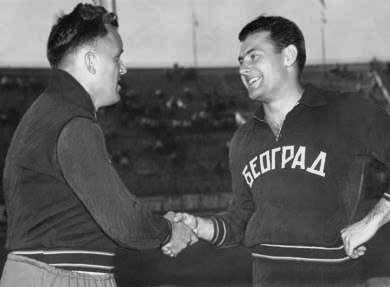
- Račić and Bezjak (right)

Personal information
- Born: 29 June 1935 Varaždin, Kingdom of Yugoslavia
- Died: 21 July 2022 (aged 87) Varaždin, Croatia
- Height: 1.84 m (6 ft 0 in)
- Weight: 95 kg (209 lb)

Sport
- Sport: Athletics
- Event: Hammer throw
- Club: Dinamo Zagreb

Achievements and titles
- Personal best: 65.38 m (1960)
Medal record
Representing Yugoslavia
Mediterranean Games
Gold medal – first place	1963 Naples	Hammer throw

Zvonko Bezjak (born Antun Petar Bezjak, 29 June 1935 – 21 July 2022) was a Croatian hammer thrower of Slovenian origin. He competed for Yugoslavia at the 1960 Summer Olympics and finished in sixth place. He won a gold medal at the 1963 Mediterranean Games.

As a teenager Bezjak tried fencing and wrestling before changing to athletics. In 1953 he won the Yugoslav junior pentathlon championships, where he performed well not only in throwing, but also in sprint events, running 100 m in 11.3 and 200 m in 23.2 seconds. Next year he moved from his native Varaždin to Zagreb, and received a degree in economics there in 1960. During his hammer throwing career Bezjak had a strong rivalry with Krešimir Račić, with Bezjak winning the Yugoslav title in 1956, 1958, 1960 and 1963 and Račić in 1954, 1955, 1957, 1959, 1961, 1962 and 1964. Bezjak retired in 1965. He did not pursue a coaching career, and instead worked for the catering company Ključice in Novi Marof until 1991.

He had a sister Vida, whose son Zlatko Bezjak became a competitive javelin thrower.
