= Jean Cochard =

French long jumper

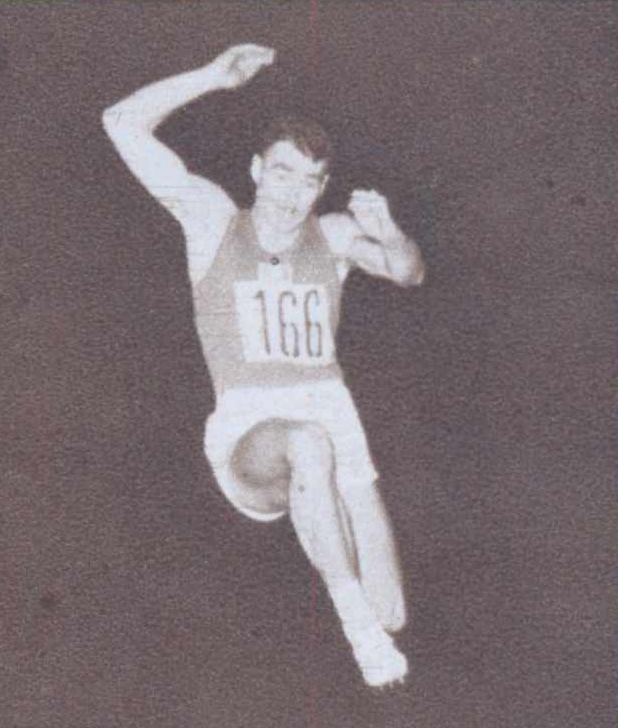

Personal information
- Nationality: French
- Born: 27 March 1939 (age 87)

Sport
- Sport: Athletics
- Event: Long jump
Medal record
Men's athletics
Representing France
European Championships
Bronze medal – third place	1966 Budapest	Long jump

Jean Cochard (born 27 March 1939) is a French athlete. He competed in the men's long jump at the 1964 Summer Olympics and the 1968 Summer Olympics.
