= Giorgio Mazza =

Italian hurdler

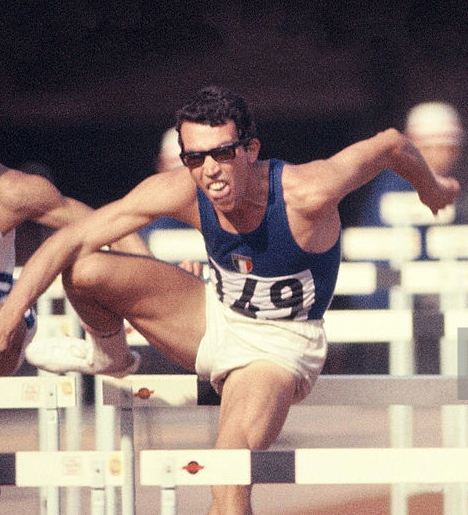
- Giorgio Mazza at the 1964 Olympics

Personal information
- Nationality: Italian
- Born: 23 September 1939 (age 86) Mestre, Italy
- Height: 1.80 m (5 ft 11 in)
- Weight: 70 kg (154 lb)

Sport
- Country: Italy
- Sport: Athletics
- Event: Hurdling
- Club: G.S. Fiamme Oro

Achievements and titles
- Personal best: 110 m hs: 13.9 (1964)
Medal record
Representing Italy
Summer Universiade
Gold medal – first place	1959 Turin	4x100m relay
Silver medal – second place	1963 Porto Alegre	110m hurdles
Bronze medal – third place	1959 Turin	110m hurdles
Mediterranean Games
Bronze medal – third place	1963 Naples	110m hurdles

Giorgio Mazza (born 23 September 1939) is a retired Italian hurdler. He competed at the 1964 Olympics in the 110 m hurdles and finished in eighth place.

== Biography ==
Mazza won three national 110 m titles in 1957, 1958 and 1963. He achieved his personal best of 13.9 seconds in July 1964 in Reggio Emilia. The Italian record currently belongs to Andrea Giaconi with 13.35 seconds.

== Achievements ==
Year	Tournament	Venue	Result	Extra
1958	European Championships	Stockholm, Sweden	5th	110 m hurdles
1959	Universiade	Turin, Italy	3rd	110 m hurdles
1962	European Championships	Belgrade, Yugoslavia	5th	110 m hurdles
1963	Universiade	Porto Alegre, Brazil	2nd	110 m hurdles
1963	Mediterranean Games	Naples, Italy	3rd	110 m hurdles
1964	Olympic Games	Tokyo, Japan	8th	110 m hurdles
