= Alfredo Rizzo (athlete) =

Italian middle-distance runner (1933–2023)

Personal information
- Nationality: Italian
- Born: 1 July 1933 Milan, Italy
- Died: 7 February 2023 (aged 89) Milan, Italy
- Height: 1.75 m (5 ft 9 in)
- Weight: 71 kg (157 lb)

Sport
- Country: Italy
- Sport: Athletics
- Event(s): Middle-distance running 3000 metres steeplechase

Alfredo Rizzo (1 July 1933 – 7 February 2023) was an Italian middle-distance runner who competed at the 1960 Summer Olympics.

Nicknamed "King", Rizzo was the first Italian to go under 9' in the 3000 metres steeplechase. During his career he set up 14 national records and competed 37 times in the national team. After his retirement, he served as a trainer, manager and master of ceremonies in the Milan team Riccardi.
