= Giorgio Bortolozzi =

Italian long jumper

Personal information
- Full name: Giorgio Maria Bortolozzi
- National team: Italy: 8 (1963–1964)
- Born: 4 January 1937 Treviso, Italy
- Died: 11 September 2023 (aged 86) Treviso

Sport
- Sport: Athletics
- Event: Long jump
- Club: GA Treviso

Giorgio Bortolozzi (4 January 1937 – 11 September 2023) was an Italian long jumper and master athlete.

== Career ==
Two-time national champion at senior level in long jump in 1962 and 1964.

== Doping as a master athlete ==
In 2016 he was found positive for a steroid at the Italian Masters Championships, disqualified for 4 years. In 2020, at the age of 83 he returned to compete and win in masters athletics.

== Achievements ==
Year	Competition	Venue	Rank	Event	Measure	Notes
1963	Mediterranean Games	(Italy) Naples	4th	Long jump	7.37 m	

Masters athletics

Year	Competition	Venue	Rank	Event	Measure	Notes
2015	World Championships	(France) Lyon	1st	Triple jump M75	8.96 m	

== See also ==
- List of Italian records in masters athletics
