= Gaetano Dalla Pria =

Italian discus thrower

Personal information
- Nationality: Italian
- Born: 24 January 1940 (age 86) Montebello Vicentino, Italy

Sport
- Country: Italy
- Sport: Athletics
- Event: Discus throw
- Coached by: Raffaele Drei
Medal record
Summer Universiade
Gold medal – first place	1963 Porto Alegre	Discus throw
Mediterranean Games
Silver medal – second place	1963 Naples	Discus throw

Gaetano Dalla Pria (born 24 January 1940 in Montebello Vicentino) is a former discus thrower with eleven caps for the Italy national athletics team from 1961 to 1964. In 1963, he won two individual Italian Athletics Championships.
