= Francesco Bianchi (athlete) =

Italian middle-distance runner

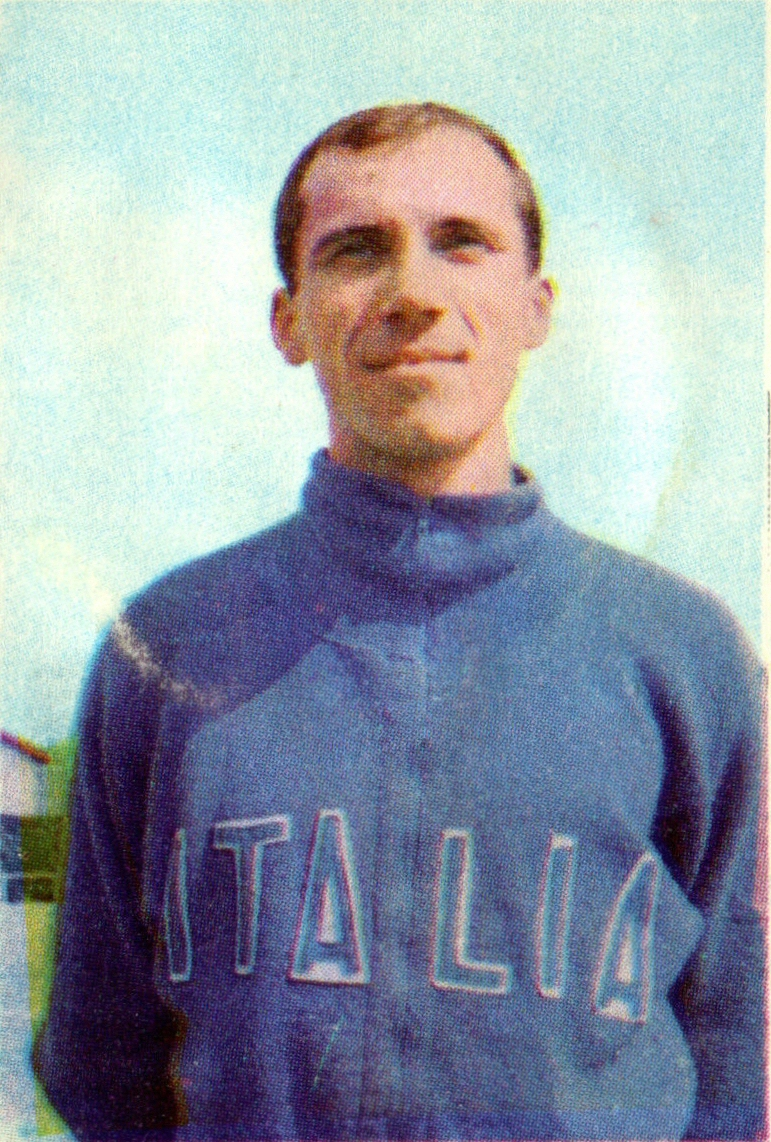
- Francesco Bianchi in 1967.

Personal information
- Nationality: Italian
- Born: 15 January 1940 Melegnano, Italy
- Died: 2 September 1977 (aged 37) Milan, Italy

Sport
- Country: Italy
- Sport: Athletics
- Event: Middle distance running
- Club: Pro Sesto Atletica

Achievements and titles
- Personal bests: 800: 1:48.3 (1965); 1500: 3:42.5 (1965)
Medal record
Mediterranean Games
Gold medal – first place	1963 Naples	800 metres

Francesco Bianchi (15 January 1940 – 20 September 1977) was an Italian middle distance runner, that won a gold medal at the Mediterranean Games.

== Biography ==
Francesco Bianchi participated in one edition of the Summer Olympics (1964).

== National titles ==
Francesco Bianchi won the individual national championship nine times.

- 5 wins on 800 metres (1961, 1962, 1964, 1965, 1967)
- 4 wins on 1500 metres (1962, 1963, 1964, 1965)

== See also ==
- 800 metres winners of Italian Athletics Championships
- 1500 metres winners of Italian Athletics Championships
