= Giovanni Cornacchia =

Italian hurdler (1939–2008)

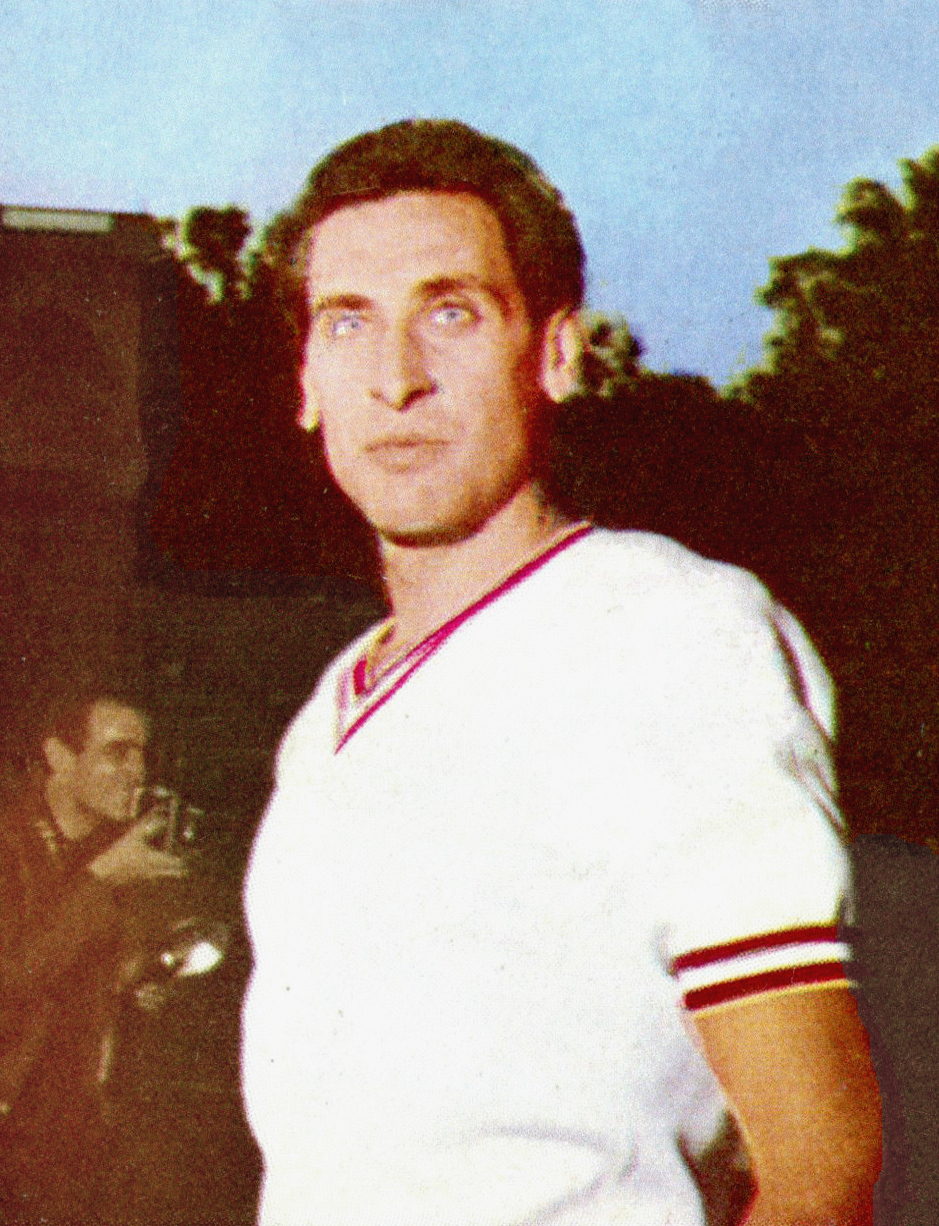

Personal information
- Nationality: Italian
- Born: 18 June 1939 Pescara, Italy
- Died: 23 June 2008 (aged 69) Pescara, Italy
- Height: 1.86 m (6 ft 1 in)
- Weight: 78 kg (172 lb)

Sport
- Country: Italy
- Sport: Athletics
- Event: 110 m hurdles
- Club: FIAT Torino

Achievements and titles
- Personal best: 14.06 (1964)
Medal record
Men's athletics
Representing Italy
European Championships
Silver medal – second place	1962 Belgrade	110 m hurdles
Mediterranean Games
Gold medal – first place	1967 Tunisia	110 m hurdles
Universiade
Silver medal – second place	1965 Budapest	110 m hurdles

Giovanni Cornacchia (18 June 1939 in Pescara– 23 July 2008 in Pescara) was an Italian hurdler who specialized in the 110 m distance. He won a gold medal at the 1967 Mediterranean Games and silver medals at the 1962 European Championships and 1965 Universiade. He competed at the 1960, 1964 and 1968 Olympics with the best result of seventh place in 1964.

== Biography ==
Cornacchia won three national titles in the 110 m hurdles: in 1960, 1962 and 1964.

On 22 October 2009, the Stadio Adriatico in Pescara was renamed to Stadio Adriatico – Giovanni Cornacchia.
