= 1963 Mediterranean Games =

4th edition of the Mediterranean Games

IV Mediterranean Games Naples 1963
- Host city: Naples, Italy
- Nations: 13
- Athletes: 1,057
- Events: 93 in 17 sports
- Opening: 21 September 1963
- Closing: 29 September 1963
- Opened by: Antonio Segni
- Main venue: Stadio San Paolo

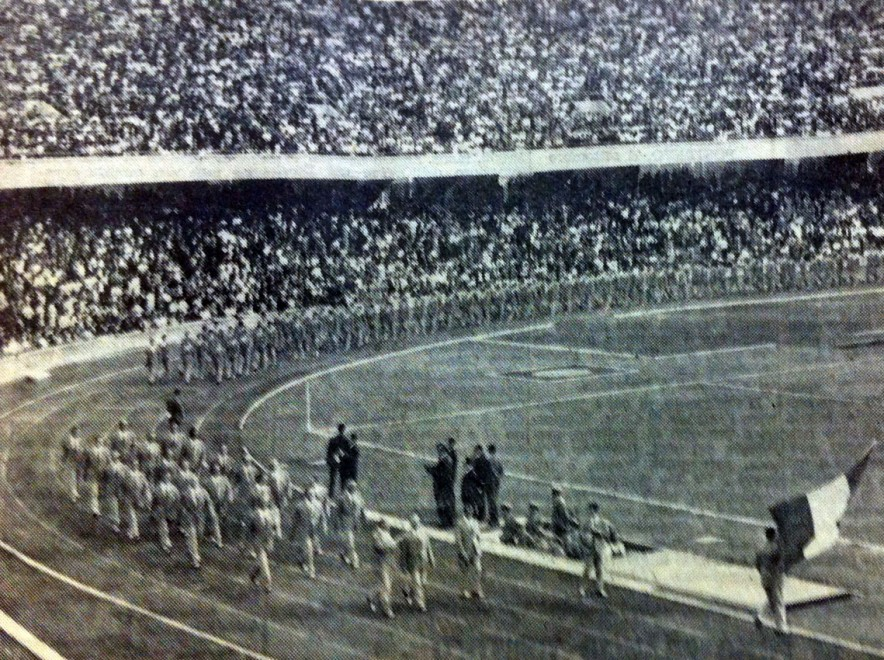
Opening ceremony moment

The 1963 Mediterranean Games, officially known as the IV Mediterranean Games, and commonly known as Naples 1963, were the 4th Mediterranean Games and the first Mediterranean Games held in Italy. The Games were held in Naples, Italy over 8 days, from 21 to 29 September 1963, where 1,057 athletes (all men) from 13 countries participated. There were a total of 93 medal events from 17 different sports.

== Participating nations ==
The following is a list of nations that participated in the 1963 Mediterranean Games:

- France (72)
- Greece (72)
- Italy (117)
- Lebanon (54)
- Malta (36)
- Monaco (3)
- Morocco (108)
- Spain (108)
- Syria (72)
- Tunisia (46)
- Turkey (99)
- United Arab Republic (144)
- Yugoslavia (126)

== Venues ==
- Stadio San Paolo
- Stadio Arturo Collana
- PalaArgento
- Velodromo Albricci
- Piscina Felice Scandone
- Lago di Patria

== Sports ==
The IV Mediterranean Games sports program featured 93 events in 17 sports. The numbers in parentheses represent the number of medal events per sport.

- Athletics (21)
- Basketball (1)
- Boxing (10)
- Cycling (7)
- Diving (2)
- Fencing (3)
- Field hockey (1)
- Football (1)
- Gymnastics (8)
- Rowing (7)
- Sailing (3)
- Shooting (1)
- Swimming (8)
- Tennis (2)
- Volleyball (1)
- Water polo (1)
- Wrestling (16)

== Medal table ==
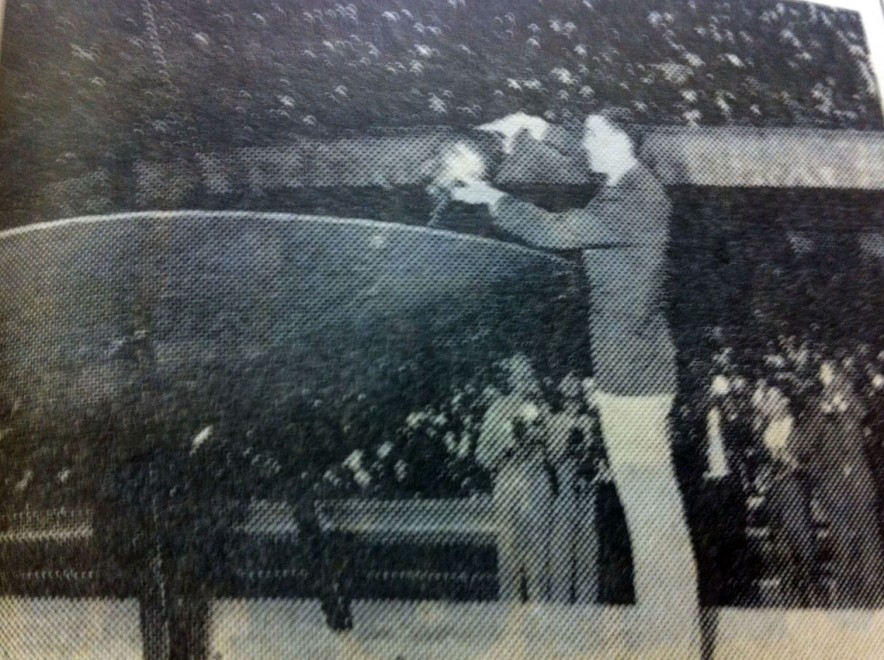
Opening ceremony moment

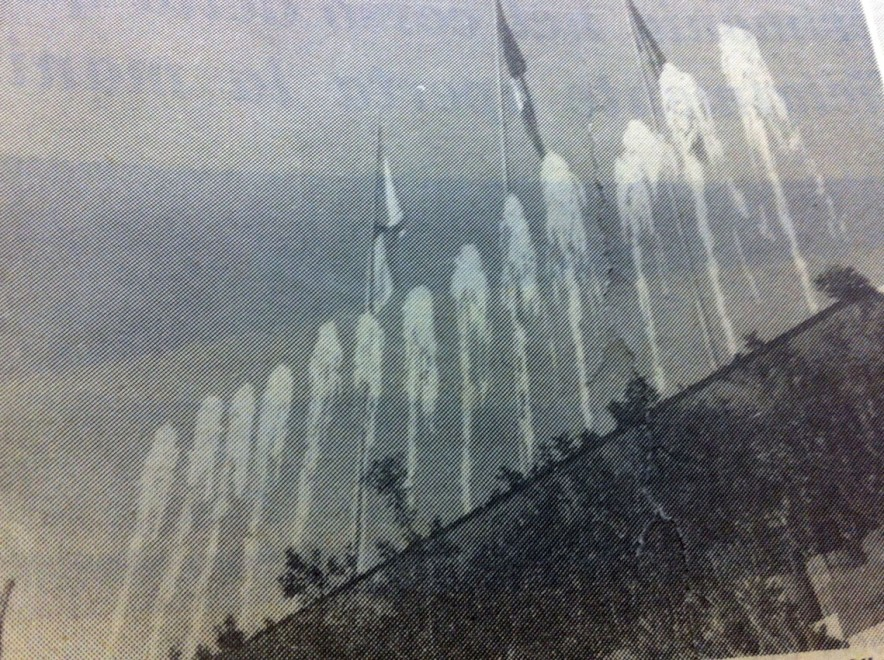
Opening ceremony moment

* Host nation (Italy)

Rank	Nation	Gold	Silver	Bronze	Total
1	Italy*	32	21	16	69
2	Turkey	10	3	4	17
3	France	8	14	8	30
4	Yugoslavia	6	8	8	22
5	United Arab Republic	5	13	9	27
6	Spain	4	4	12	20
7	Syria	0	1	3	4
8	Tunisia	0	1	1	2
9	Morocco	0	0	7	7
10	Greece	0	0	5	5
11	Lebanon	0	0	1	1
11	Monaco	0	0	1	1
Totals (12 entries)		65	65	75	205
