= Athletics at the 1952 Summer Olympics – Men's 4 × 400 metres relay =

Men's 4 × 400 metres relay at the Games of the XV Olympiad
- Dates: July 26, 1952 (heats); July 27, 1952 (final)
- Competitors: from 18 nations
- Teams: 18
- Winning time: 3:03.9 (hand); 3:04.04 (automatic)

Medalists
| 1st place, gold medalist(s) | | Arthur Wint; Leslie Laing; Herb McKenley; George Rhoden | Jamaica |
| 2nd place, silver medalist(s) | | Ollie Matson; Gerrard Cole; Charles Moore; Mal Whitfield | United States |
| 3rd place, bronze medalist(s) | | Günter Steines; Hans Geister; Heinz Ulzheimer; Karl-Friedrich Haas | Germany |

The men's 4 × 400 metres relay event at the 1952 Olympic Games took place on July 26 & July 27.

The Jamaican team won the final, with the medalists breaking the 20-year-old world record.

Herb McKenley's third leg of 44.6, credited with pulling Jamaica into contention from 10 metres back, is considered one of the greatest relay legs in history, and on the last leg, George Rhoden, the 400 metres champion and Mal Whitfield the 800 metres champion, ran virtually shoulder to shoulder, but Rhoden was able to keep the lead, and beat Whitfield by a yard.

== Results ==
=== Heats ===
==== Round One Heat One ====
Video on YouTube Heat 1 amateur film

| Rank | Country | Athletes | Time (hand) | Time (automatic) | Notes |
|---|---|---|---|---|---|
| 1 | Jamaica | Arthur Wint, Les Laing, Herb McKenley, George Rhoden | 3:12.1 | 3:12.13 | Q |
| 2 | France | Jean-Pierre Goudeau, Robert Bart, Jacques Degats, Jean-Paul Martin du Gard | 3:12.6 | 3:12.72 | Q |
| 3 | Sweden | Gösta Brännström, Tage Ekfeldt, Rune Larsson, Lars-Erik Wolfbrandt | 3:13.4 | 3:13.55 | |
| 4 | Belgium | Albert Lowagie, Antoine Uyterhoeven, Roger Moens, Fernand Linssen | 3:15.8 | 3:16.05 | |
| 5 | Luxembourg | Roby Schaeffer, Jean Hamilius, Fred Hammer, Gérard Rasquin | 3:16.2 | 3:16.38 | |
| 6 | Finland | Pauli Tavisalo, Ossi Mildh, Ragnar Graeffe, Rolf Back | 3:16.4 | 3:16.67 | |
| 7 | Japan | Junkichi Matoba, Eitaro Okano, Hiroshi Yamamoto, Yoshitaka Muroya | 3:20.3 | 3:20.55 | |

==== Round One Heat Two ====
| Rank | Country | Athletes | Time (hand) | Time (automatic) | Notes |
|---|---|---|---|---|---|
| 1 | United States | Ollie Matson, Gene Cole, Charlie Moore, Mal Whitfield | 3:11.5 | 3:11.67 | Q |
| 2 | Great Britain | Les Lewis, Alan Dick, Terry Higgins, Nick Stacey | 3:12.5 | 3:12.67 | Q |
| 3 | Hungary | Ferenc Bánhalmi, Lajos Szentgáli, Egon Solymossy, Zoltán Adamik | 3:13.8 | 3:13.96 | |
| 4 | Italy | Baldassare Porto, Gianni Rocca, Luigi Grossi, Armando Filiput | 3:15.2 | 3:15.23 | |
| 5 | Switzerland | Hans Ernst Schneider, Josef Steger, Paul Stalder, Ernst von Gunten | 3:15.4 | 3:15.36 | |
| 6 | Pakistan | Abdul Rehman, Muhammad Shafi, Mirza Khan, Aurang Zeb | 3:23.2 | | |

==== Round One Heat Three ====
| Rank | Country | Athletes | Time (hand) | Time (automatic) | Notes |
|---|---|---|---|---|---|
| 1 | Germany | Hans Geister, Günther Steines, Heinz Ulzheimer, Karl-Friedrich Haas | 3:10.5 | 3:10.57 | Q |
| 2 | Canada | Doug Clement, Jack Hutchins, Jack Carroll, James Lavery | 3:11.2 | 3:11.49 | Q |
| 3 | Soviet Union | Ardalion Ignatyev, Gennady Slepnyov, Edmunds Pīlāgs, Yury Lituyev | 3:12.5 | 3:12.65 | |
| 4 | South Africa | Louis van Biljon, Ron Wilke, John Anderton, Bill Chivell | 3:14.8 | 3:15.09 | |
| 5 | Australia | Ray Weinberg, Morris Curotta, Ken Doubleday, Edwin Carr Jr. | 3:15.8 | 3:16.00 | |

=== Final ===
Video on YouTube Official film of the final

| Rank | Country | Time (hand) | Time (automatic) | Notes |
|---|---|---|---|---|
| 1st place, gold medalist(s) | Jamaica | 3:03.9 | 3:04.04 | WR |
| 2nd place, silver medalist(s) | United States | 3:04.0 | 3:04.21 | |
| 3rd place, bronze medalist(s) | Germany | 3:06.6 | 3:06.78 | |
| 4 | Canada | 3:09.3 | 3:09.37 | |
| 5 | Great Britain | 3:10.0 | 3:10.23 | |
| 6 | France | 3:10.1 | 3:10.33 | |

Key: WR = World record
