= Canada at the 1952 Summer Olympics =

- IOC code: CAN
- NOC: Canadian Olympic Committee

in Helsinki, Finland 19 July – 4 August 1952
- Competitors: 107 in 13 sports
- Flag bearer: Bill Parnell
- Medals Ranked 21st: Gold 1 Silver 2 Bronze 0 Total 3

Summer Olympics appearances (overview)
- 1900; 1904; 1908; 1912; 1920; 1924; 1928; 1932; 1936; 1948; 1952; 1956; 1960; 1964; 1968; 1972; 1976; 1980; 1984; 1988; 1992; 1996; 2000; 2004; 2008; 2012; 2016; 2020; 2024

Other related appearances
- 1906 Intercalated Games

Canada competed at the 1952 Summer Olympics in Helsinki, Finland. 107 competitors, 97 men and 10 women, took part in 74 events in 13 sports.

== Medallists ==
=== Gold ===
- George Genereux – Shooting, men's trap

=== Silver ===
- Kenneth Lane and Donald Hawgood – Canoeing, men's C-2 10000 m
- Gerry Gratton – Weightlifting, men's 67.5–75 kg (middleweight)

== Athletics ==
Key

- Note–Ranks given for track events are within the athlete's heat only
- Q = Qualified for the next round

Men
Track & road events

Athlete	Event	Heat		Quarterfinal		Semifinal		Final	
Athlete	Event	Result	Rank	Result	Rank	Result	Rank	Result	Rank
Robert Hutchinson	100 m	11.26	5	Did not advance					
Walter Sutton	100 m	11.45	6	Did not advance					
Don McFarlane	100 m	11.25	3	Did not advance					
Don McFarlane	200 m	22.94	1 Q	22.33	5	Did not advance			
Walter Sutton	200 m	22.53	5	Did not advance					
Robert Hutchinson	200 m	22.66	2 Q	22.55	6	Did not advance			
Jack Carroll	400 m	48.05	2 Q	47.82	3 Q	47.61	5	Did not advance	
Doug Clement	400 m	50.19	5	Did not advance					
James Lavery	400 m	48.47	1 Q	47.67	2 Q	47.83	6	Did not advance	
Jack Hutchins	800 m	1:54.5	1 Q	—N/a		1:52.8	4	Did not advance	
John Ross	800 m	1:52.5	4	—N/a		Did not advance			
Bill Parnell	800 m	1:53.1	3 Q	—N/a		1:52.7	6	Did not advance	
Jack Hutchins	1500 m	DNS		—N/a		Did not advance			
Bill Parnell	1500 m	3:53.4	4 Q	—N/a		3:52.4	10	Did not advance	
John Ross	1500 m	3:55.2	4 Q	—N/a		4:00.6	12	Did not advance	
Rich Ferguson	5000 m	DNF		—N/a				Did not advance	
Gordon Crosby	110 m hurdles	14.8	3	—N/a		Did not advance			
Gordon Crosby; Robert Hutchinson; Don McFarlane; Walter Sutton	4 × 100 m relay	42.6	5	—N/a		Did not advance			
Doug Clement; Jack Hutchins; Jack Carroll; James Lavery	4 × 400 m relay	3:11.2	2 Q	—N/a				3:09.3	4
Paul Collins	Marathon	—N/a						2:45:58.0	40
Ferd Hayward	10 km walk	DNS		—N/a				Did not advance	
Ferd Hayward	50 km walk	—N/a						5:04:40.4	25

Field events

Athlete	Event	Qualification		Final	
Athlete	Event	Result	Rank	Result	Rank
Ron Miller	Pole vault	3.90	21	Did not advance	
Gino Roy Pella	Shot put	DNS		Did not advance	
Roy Pella	Discus throw	46.58	11 Q	46.63	14
Bob Adams	Discus throw	DNS		Did not advance	

Combined events – Decathlon

Athlete	Event	100 m	LJ	SP	HJ	400 m	110H	DT	PV	JT	1500 m	Final	Rank
Bob Adams	Result	11.95	6.22	12.01	1.75	55.2	16.6	42.45	3.70	44.83	4:57.0	5530	19
Bob Adams	Points	650	567	582	711	520	489	696	596	436	283	5530	19

Women
Track & road events

Athlete	Event	Heat		Quarterfinal		Semifinal		Final	
Athlete	Event	Result	Rank	Result	Rank	Result	Rank	Result	Rank
Rosella Thorne	100 m	12.5	3	Did not advance					
Luella Law	100 m	12.4	3	Did not advance					
Eleanor McKenzie	100 m	12.2	2 Q	12.1	5	Did not advance			
Frances O'Halloran	200 m	25.2	4	—N/a		Did not advance			
Eleanor McKenzie	200 m	25.5	2 Q	—N/a		25.1	5	Did not advance	
Luella Law	200 m	25.7	2 Q	—N/a		25.3	6	Did not advance	
Shirley Eckel	80 m hurdles	DNS		—N/a		Did not advance			
Luella Law	80 m hurdles	11.8	3	—N/a		Did not advance			
Rosella Thorne	80 m hurdles	DNS		—N/a		Did not advance			
Luella Law; Eleanor McKenzie; Frances O'Halloran; Rosella Thorne	4 × 100 m relay	47.3	3	—N/a				Did not advance	

Field events

Athlete	Event	Qualification		Final	
Athlete	Event	Result	Rank	Result	Rank
Dawn Josephs	Long jump	5.34	22	5.47	17
Rosella Thorne	Long jump	No mark		Did not advance	
Dawn Josephs	Long jump	—N/a		1.50	13
Alice Whitty	Long jump	—N/a		1.55	10

== Basketball ==
Men's team competition

- Qualification round (Group C)
  - Defeated Italy (68–57)
  - Defeated Romania (72–51)
  - Defeated Egypt (63–57)
- Main round (group C)
  - Lost to Brazil (55–57)
  - Lost to Argentina (81–82)
  - Lost to Philippines (65–81) → did not advance, 13th place
- Team roster
  - Ralph Campbell
  - William Coulthard
  - James Curren
  - Charles Dalton
  - William Pataky
  - Glen Pettinger
  - Robert Phibbs
  - Bernard Pickell
  - (John) Carl Ridd
  - Robert Simpson
  - Harry Wade
  - George Wearring
  - Roy Williams

== Boxing ==
Men's Light Welterweight (–63,5 kg)

- Roy Keenan
  1. First round – lost to Piet van Klaveren (Netherlands) on points (1–2)

Men's featherweight (–57 kg)

- Leonard Walters
  1. First round – defeated Salah El Din Ahmed Fathi (Egypt) on points (3–0)
  2. Second round – defeated Willi Roth (Germany) on points (2–1)
  3. Quarterfinals – lost to Leonard John Leisching (South Africa) on points (0–3)

Men's lightweight (–60 kg)

- Clayton Kenny
  1. First round – defeated Niels Erik Berthelsen (Denmark) on technical knock-out in third round
  2. Second round – lost to István Juhász (Hungary) on points (1–2)

Men's welterweight (–67 kg)

- Jacob Butula
  1. First round – bye
  2. Second round – lost to Ron Norris (India) on technical knock-out in third round

Men's Light Middleweight (–71 kg)

- Charles Chase
  1. First round – defeated Andre Oueillé (France) on points (2–1)
  2. Second round – lost to László Papp (Hungary) on knock-out in second round

Men's middleweight (–75 kg)

- Robert Malouf
  1. First round – bye
  2. Second round – lost to Leen Jansen (Netherlands) on technical knock-out in first round

Men's Heavyweight (> 91 kg)

- James Saunders
  1. First round – bye
  2. Second round – lost to Giacomo di Segni (Italy) on points (0–3)

== Cycling ==
Track Competition

Men's 1.000m Time Trial

- Frederick Henry
  - Final – 1:17.6 (→ 22nd place)

Men's 1.000m Sprint Scratch Race

- John Millman – 8th place

== Fencing ==
Two fencers, both men, represented Canada in 1952.

Men's foil

- Edward Brooke
- Roland Asselin

Men's épée

- Edward Brooke
- Roland Asselin

Men's sabre

- Roland Asselin

== Rowing ==
Canada had 15 male rowers participate in three out of seven rowing events in 1952.

Men's double sculls

- Bob Williams
- Derek Riley

Men's coxless four

- Ron Cameron
- Lloyd Montour
- Jack Zwirewich
- Art Griffiths

Men's eight

- Ted Chilcott
- Jack Taylor
- Bo Westlake
- Frank Young
- John Sharp
- Mervin Kaye
- Jack Russell
- George McCauley
- Norm Rowe (cox)

== Shooting ==
Four shooters represented Canada in 1952. George Genereux won a gold medal in the trap event.

25 m pistol

- Edson Warner

300 m rifle, three positions

- Gil Boa

50 m rifle, three positions

- Gil Boa
- Edson Warner

50 m rifle, prone

- Gil Boa
- Edson Warner

Trap

- George Genereux
- Roy Cole

== Swimming ==
Men

Ranks given are within the heat.

Athlete	Event	Heat		Semifinal		Final	
Athlete	Event	Time	Rank	Time	Rank	Time	Rank
Lucien Beaumont	100 m freestyle	1:00.4	2 Q	59.3	5	Did not advance	
Peter Salmon	100 m freestyle	1:01.0	4	Did not advance			
Allen Gilchrist	400 m freestyle	4:52.5	3 Q			Did not advance	
Gerry McNamee	400 m freestyle	4:53.5	3 Q			Did not advance	
Allen Gilchrist	1500 m freestyle	20:08.3	4	—N/a		Did not advance	
Gerry McNamee	1500 m freestyle	20:02.5	6	—N/a		Did not advance	
Lucien Beaumont	100 m backstroke	1:14.2	6	Did not advance			
Peter Salmon	100 m backstroke	1:13.8	6	Did not advance			
George Portelance	200 m breaststroke	2:42.5	3 Q	2:43.8	8	Did not advance	
Gerry McNamee; Lucien Beaumont; George Portelance; Allen Gilchrist	4 × 200 m freestyle relay	9:10.9	4	—N/a		Did not advance	

Women

Ranks given are within the heat.

Athlete	Event	Heat		Semifinal		Final	
Athlete	Event	Time	Rank	Time	Rank	Time	Rank
Kay McNamee	100 m freestyle	1:12.9	5	Did not advance			
Gladys Priestley	100 m freestyle	1:13.4	6	Did not advance			
Irene Strong	100 m freestyle	1:15.1	6	Did not advance			
Kay McNamee	400 m freestyle	5:50.5	5	Did not advance			
Gladys Priestley	400 m freestyle	5:52.7	6	Did not advance			
Lenora Fisher	100 m backstroke	1:22.9	5	—N/a		Did not advance	
Irene Strong	200 m breaststroke	3:13.5	6	Did not advance			
Irene Strong; Lenora Fisher; Gladys Priestley; Kay McNamee	4 × 100 m freestyle relay	4:54.8	5	—N/a		Did not advance	
