= Austria at the 1952 Summer Olympics =

- IOC code: AUT
- NOC: Austrian Olympic Committee

in Helsinki
- Competitors: 112 in 16 sports
- Flag bearer: Willi Welt
- Medals Ranked 32nd: Gold 0 Silver 1 Bronze 1 Total 2

Summer Olympics appearances (overview)
- 1896; 1900; 1904; 1908; 1912; 1920; 1924; 1928; 1932; 1936; 1948; 1952; 1956; 1960; 1964; 1968; 1972; 1976; 1980; 1984; 1988; 1992; 1996; 2000; 2004; 2008; 2012; 2016; 2020; 2024

Other related appearances
- 1906 Intercalated Games

Austria competed at the 1952 Summer Olympics in Helsinki, Finland. 112 competitors, 91 men and 21 women, took part in 70 events in 16 sports.

== Medalists ==
Medal	Name	Sport	Event
Silver	Gertrude Liebhart	Canoeing	Women's K-1 500m
Bronze	Maximilian Raub; Herbert Wiedermann	Canoeing	Men's K-2 1000m

== Athletics ==
Key

- Note–Ranks given for track events are within the athlete's heat only
- Q = Qualified for the next round

Men
Track & road events

Athlete	Event	Heat		Quarterfinal		Semifinal		Final	
Athlete	Event	Result	Rank	Result	Rank	Result	Rank	Result	Rank
Rupert Blöch	400 m	49.82	3	Did not advance					
Rudolf Haidegger	400 m	50.01	4	Did not advance					
Fritz Prossinagg	1500 m	3:54.2	5	—N/a		Did not advance			
Helmuth Perz	5000 m	14:57.2	11	—N/a				Did not advance	
Kurt Rötzer	5000 m	14:49.4	10	—N/a				Did not advance	
Helmuth Perz	10,000 m	—N/a						32:13.2	27
Rudolf Haidegger	400 m hurdles	54.8	4	Did not advance					
Adolf Gruber	Marathon	—N/a						2:45:02.0	39

Field events

Athlete	Event	Qualification		Final	
Athlete	Event	Result	Rank	Result	Rank
Felix Würth	Long jump	6.99	15	Did not advance	
Felix Würth	Triple jump	13.65	31	Did not advance	
Alois Schwabl	Shot put	15.00	9 Q	14.45	13
Hermann Tunner	Discus throw	DNS		Did not advance	

Women
Track & road events

Athlete	Event	Heat		Quarterfinal		Semifinal		Final	
Athlete	Event	Result	Rank	Result	Rank	Result	Rank	Result	Rank
Elfriede Steurer	100 m	12.7	4	Did not advance					
Gertrud Pruschak	80 m hurdles	DNS		—N/a		Did not advance			
Helene Bielansky	80 m hurdles	11.8	4	—N/a		Did not advance			
Elfriede Steurer	80 m hurdles	11.4	4	—N/a		Did not advance			

Field events

Athlete	Event	Qualification		Final	
Athlete	Event	Result	Rank	Result	Rank
Lotte Haidegger	Shot put	DNS		Did not advance	
Lotte Haidegger	Discus throw	39.54	9 Q	43.49	5
Frieda Tiltsch	Discus throw	39.47	10 Q	27.84	18
Herma Bauma	Javelin throw	43.07	7 Q	42.54	9
Gerda Schilling-Staniek	Javelin throw	NM		Did not advance	

== Cycling ==
Road Competition

Men's Individual Road Race (190.4 km)

- Walter Bortel – did not finish (→ no ranking)
- Franz Wimmer – did not finish (→ no ranking)
- Arthur Mannsbarth – did not finish (→ no ranking)

Track Competition

Men's 1.000m Time Trial

- Kurt Nemetz
  - Final – 1:17.5 (→ 21st place)

Men's 1.000m Sprint Scratch Race

- Kurt Nemetz – 15th place

== Diving ==
Men

Athlete	Event	Preliminary		Final	
Athlete	Event	Points	Rank	Points	Rank
Franz Worisch	3 m springboard	67.18	10	Did not advance	
Julius Janowsky	10 m platform	62.65	24	Did not advance	
Kurt Liederer	10 m platform	60.21	27	Did not advance	
Franz Worisch	10 m platform	63.02	22	Did not advance	

Women

Athlete	Event	Preliminary		Final	
Athlete	Event	Points	Rank	Points	Rank
Eva Pfarrhofer	10 m platform	40.26	9	Did not advance	

== Fencing ==
Men's sabre

- Werner Plattner
- Heinz Lechner
- Hubert Loisel

Men's team sabre

- Werner Plattner, Heinz Putzl, Hubert Loisel, Heinz Lechner, Paul Kerb

Women's foil

- Ellen Müller-Preis
- Fritzi Wenisch-Filz
- Grete Kunz

== Football ==
19 July 1952
19:00

Finland	3–4	Austria
Stolpe 11', 34'; Rytkönen 36'	Report	Gollnhuber 8' (pen.), 30'; Stumpf 59'; Grohs 79'

Olympic Stadium, Helsinki
Attendance: 33,053
Referee: William Ling (GBR)

23 July 1952
19:00

Sweden	3–1	Austria
Sandberg 80'; Brodd 85'; Rydell 87'	Report	Grohs 40'

Töölön Pallokenttä, Helsinki
Attendance: 12,564
Referee: Vincenzo Orlandini (ITA)

== Rowing ==
Austria had four male rowers participate in one out of seven rowing events in 1952.

Men's coxless four

- Kurt Marz
- Alexander Mitterhuber
- Adolf Scheithauer
- Johann Geiszler

== Sailing ==
Open

Athlete	Event	Race							Net points	Final rank
Athlete	Event	1	2	3	4	5	6	7	Net points	Final rank
Wolfgang Erndl	Finn	~~DSQ~~	4	9	16	4	15	3	4273	5
Harald Musil; Harald Fereberger	Star	~~16~~	15	18	8	13	8	14	2260	14

== Shooting ==
Three shooters represented Austria in 1952.

Men

Athlete	Event	Final	
Athlete	Event	Score	Rank
Siegfried Gurschler	50 m rifle, three positions	1145	17
Siegfried Gurschler	50 m rifle, prone	396	18
Wilhelm Sachsenmaier	50 m rifle, three positions	1140	19
Wilhelm Sachsenmaier	50 m rifle, prone	396	23
Laszlo Szapáry	Trap	178	22

== Swimming ==
Men

Ranks given are within the heat.

Athlete	Event	Heat		Semifinal		Final	
Athlete	Event	Time	Rank	Time	Rank	Time	Rank
Peter Steinwender	400 m freestyle	5:03.6	4	Did not advance			
Helmut Koppelstätter	100 m backstroke	1:11.9	4	Did not advance			

Women

Athlete	Event	Heat		Semifinal		Final	
Athlete	Event	Time	Rank	Time	Rank	Time	Rank
Ilse Albert	200 m breaststroke	3:12.5	24	Did not advance			
