= South Africa at the 1952 Summer Olympics =

- IOC code: RSA (ZAF used at these Games)
- NOC: South African Sports Confederation and Olympic Committee

in Helsinki
- Competitors: 64 (60 men and 4 women) in 13 sports
- Flag bearer: Schalk Booysen
- Medals Ranked 12th: Gold 2 Silver 4 Bronze 4 Total 10

Summer Olympics appearances (overview)
- 1904; 1908; 1912; 1920; 1924; 1928; 1932; 1936; 1948; 1952; 1956; 1960; 1964–1988; 1992; 1996; 2000; 2004; 2008; 2012; 2016; 2020; 2024

The Union of South Africa competed at the 1952 Summer Olympics in Helsinki, Finland. 64 competitors, 60 men and 4 women, took part in 59 events in 13 sports.

== Medalists ==
=== Gold ===
- Esther Brand — Athletics, Women's High Jump
- Joan Harrison — Swimming, Women's 100m Backstroke

=== Silver ===
- Daphne Hasenjager — Athletics, Women's 100 metres
- Theunis van Schalkwyk — Boxing, Men's Light Middleweight
- George Estman, Robert Fowler, Thomas Shardelow, and Alfred Swift — Cycling, Men's 4.000m Team Pursuit
- Raymond Robinson and Thomas Shardelow — Cycling, Men's 2.000m Tandem

=== Bronze ===
- Willie Toweel — Boxing, Men's Flyweight
- Leonard Leisching — Boxing, Men's Featherweight
- Andries Nieman — Boxing, Men's Heavyweight
- Raymond Robinson — Cycling, Men's 1.000m Time Trial

== Athletics ==
South Africa was represented in athletics by 10 men and 4 women.

Men:

- 100 metres - Neville Price (did not compete)
- 200 metres - Schalk Booysen (4th place in Heat 3); Neville Price (did not compete)
- 400 metres - Louis van Biljon (4th place in Quarterfinal 3); Schalk Booysen (4th place in Heat 12); John Anderton (5th place in Heat 2)
- 1500 metres - Athol Jennings (6th place in Heat 3)
- 10,000 metres - Bill Keith (28th place); Syd Luyt (did not compete)
- Marathon - Wally Hayward (10th place); Syd Luyt (11th place); Bill Keith (19th place)
- 400 metres hurdles - Ron Wilke (5th place in Quarterfinal 3)
- 4 × 400 metres relay - 4th place in Heat 3
  Louis van Biljon, Ron Wilke, John Anderton, Bill Chivell; Schalk Booysen (DNS)
- Long jump - Neville Price (11th place)
- Triple jump - Neville Price (did not compete)

Women:

- 100 metres - Daphne Hasenjäger (2nd place) Silver Medal
  Edna Maskell (5th place in Quarterfinal 4)
- 200 metres - Daphne Hasenjäger (6th place)
- 80 metres hurdles - Edna Maskell (5th place in Semifinal 1)
- High jump - Esther Brand (1st place) Gold Medal
- Shot put - Esther Brand (did not compete)
- Discus throw - Esther Brand (20th place in qualifying round)

== Boxing ==
South Africa was represented in boxing by 8 men.

- Flyweight - Willie Toweel (=3rd place) Bronze Medal
- Bantamweight - Lennie von Graevenitz (=5th place)
- Featherweight - Len Leisching (=3rd place) Bronze Medal
- Lightweight - Johnny van Rensburg (=17th place)
- Light welterweight - Grant Webster (=5th place)
- Welterweight - Hendrik van der Linde (=9th place)
- Light middleweight - Theunis van Schalkwyk (2nd place) Silver Medal
- Heavyweight - Dries Niemann (=3rd place) Bronze Medal

== Cycling ==
South Africa was represented in cycling by 5 men.

=== Road Competition ===
Men's Individual Road Race (190.4 km)

- George Estman — did not finish (→ no ranking)
- Alfred Swift — did not finish (→ no ranking)
- Robert Fowler — did not finish (→ no ranking)

=== Track Competition ===
Men's 1.000m Time Trial

- Raymond Robinson

- Final — 1:13.0 (→ Bronze Medal)

Men's 1.000m Sprint Scratch Race

- Raymond Robinson — 5th place

Men's 4.000m Team Pursuit

- Alfred Swift, George Estman, Robert Fowler, and Thomas Shardelow

- Final — Lost to Italy (→ Silver Medal)

== Diving ==
One male diver represented South Africa in 1952.

Men

Athlete	Event	Preliminary		Final	
Athlete	Event	Points	Rank	Points	Rank
Willem Welgemoed	3 m springboard	61.64	22	Did not advance	

== Gymnastics ==
South Africa was represented in gymnastics by three men in 7 out of 8 events, not having enough competitors to take part in the team all-around.

- Individual all-around - Ronnie Lombard (139th place); Jack Wells (169th place); Rolf Yelseth (171st place)
- Floor exercise - Ronnie Lombard (=164th place); Jack Wells (=166th place); Rolf Yelseth (177th place)
- Horizontal bar - Ronnie Lombard (=98th place); Rolf Yelseth (141st place); Jack Wells (166th place)
- Parallel bars - Rolf Yelseth (161st place); Ronnie Lombard (163rd place); Jack Wells (=173rd place)
- Pommel horse - Ronnie Lombard (=129th place); Rolf Yelseth (=162nd place)
- Rings - Rolf Yelseth (=127th place); Jack Wells (147th place); Ronnie Lombard (=163rd place)
- Vault - Jack Wells (=79th place); Ronnie Lombard (=98th place); Rolf Yelseth (174th place)

== Modern pentathlon ==
One male pentathlete represented South Africa in 1952.

- Harry Schmidt

== Rowing ==
South Africa had five male rowers participating in two out of seven rowing events in 1952.

Men's single sculls

- Ian Stephen

Men's coxless four

- Don Dyke-Wells
- Damian Nichol
- John Webb
- Christopher Veitch

== Sailing ==
South Africa entered two of the five sailing classes with four men.

- One Person Dinghy - Hellmut Stauch (16th place)
- 5.5 metres (Shoveller) (7th place)

Eric Beningfield, Joe Ellis-Brown, Noel Horsfield

== Shooting ==
One male shooter represented South Africa in 1952.

50 m rifle, prone

- William Murless

== Swimming ==
South Africa was represented in 8 of the 11 swimming events by five men and one woman.

Men

Ranks given are within the heat.

Athlete	Event	Heat		Semifinal		Final	
Athlete	Event	Time	Rank	Time	Rank	Time	Rank
John Durr	100 m freestyle	1:00.0	4 Q	1:00.2	6	Did not advance	
Dennis Ford	100 m freestyle	1:01.3	4	Did not advance			
Peter Duncan	400 m freestyle	4:44.0	2 Q	4:41.7	2 Q	4:37.9	4
Dennis Ford	400 m freestyle	4:50.2	2 Q	4:53.6	5	Did not advance	
Graham Johnston	400 m freestyle	4:52.3	2 Q	4:45.5	5	Did not advance	
Peter Duncan	1500 m freestyle	19:03.5	1 Q	—N/a		19:12.1	7
Dennis Ford	1500 m freestyle	19:27.6	3	—N/a		Did not advance	
Graham Johnston	1500 m freestyle	19:27.1	5	—N/a		Did not advance	
Lin Meiring	100 m backstroke	1:08.5	2 Q	1:07.6	3 Q	1:08.3	8
Graham Johnston; Dennis Ford; John Durr; Peter Duncan	4 × 200 m freestyle relay	8:58.7	3 Q	—N/a		8:55.1	7

Women

Ranks given are within the heat.

Athlete	Event	Heat		Semifinal		Final	
Athlete	Event	Time	Rank	Time	Rank	Time	Rank
Joan Harrison	100 m freestyle	1:06.5	1 Q	1:07.2	1 Q	1:07.1	4
Joan Harrison	400 m freestyle	5:21.8	3 Q	5:23.1	5	Did not advance	
Joan Harrison	100 m backstroke	1:14.7	1 Q	—N/a		1:14.3	1st place, gold medalist(s)

== Water polo ==
The South African men's water polo team finished in 9th place.

- William Aucamp, Ron Meredith, Gerald Goddard, Douglas Melville, Johnnie van Gent, Des Cohen, Solly Yach, Dennis Pappas; Frank Butler, Luis González (did not compete)

== Weightlifting ==
South Africa was represented in weightlifting by four men.

- Featherweight - James van Rensburg (18th place)
- Lightweight - Barrie Engelbrecht (13th place)
- Light-heavyweight - Issy Bloomberg (6th place)
- Middle-heavyweight - Theunis Jonck (8th place)

== Wrestling ==
South Africa was represented by 5 male wrestlers.

Men's freestyle

- Flyweight - Louis Baise (6th place)
- Lightweight - Blondie Pienaar (place not known)
- Welterweight - Cyril Martin (place not known)
- Middleweight - Calie Reitz (=6th place)
- Light-Heavyweight - Jan Theron (6th place)
