= Athletics at the 1952 Summer Olympics – Men's 400 metres =

Men's 400 metres at the Games of the XV Olympiad
- Venue: Olympic Stadium
- Dates: July 24, 1952 (heats and quarterfinals); July 25, 1952 (semifinals and final)
- Competitors: 71 from 35 nations
- Winning time: 46.09 OR

Medalists
| 1st place, gold medalist(s) | | George Rhoden; Jamaica |
| 2nd place, silver medalist(s) | | Herb McKenley; Jamaica |
| 3rd place, bronze medalist(s) | | Ollie Matson; United States |

Video on YouTube amateur film

The men's 400 metres sprint event at the 1952 Olympic Games took place between July 24 and July 25. Seventy-one athletes from 35 nations competed. The maximum number of athletes per nation had been set at 3 since the 1930 Olympic Congress. The event was won by 0.11 seconds by George Rhoden of Jamaica, the second consecutive title in the event by a Jamaican. Herb McKenley repeated his silver medal performance from 1948, becoming the second man to win two medals in the event (after Guy Butler of Great Britain in 1920 and 1924).

== Summary ==
In their second Olympics, the Jamaican team came with the top runners including the world record holder George Rhoden and returning gold and silver medalists, Arthur Wint and Herb McKenley, respectively. In the final, Rhoden on the far outside in lane 7 was unable to see the competitors staggered behind him. Alone he went out hard. The stagger behind him in lane 6, Ollie Matson, who like Rhoden trained in San Francisco, stayed in Rhoden's shadow, trying to match pace. On the inside, in lane 3, defending champion Went also went out hard, quickly making up the stagger on Karl-Friedrich Haas to his outside. Down the backstretch and through the final turn, Rhoden opened up a 5 metre lead on Wint, with Matson losing a couple of more metres. Through the final turn, McKenley began to get up a head of steam, catching Matson just before the home straight, still two metres behind Wint. At that point, Jamaica held the three medal positions, but McKenley was moving much faster than everyone else, quickly catching Wint and off after Rhoden. Wint had nothing to offer the challenge and instead began moving backward. Rhoden crossed the line just ahead of the fast closing McKenley, Matson also cruising past Wint, who was pipped by Haas at the line and almost caught by Mal Whitfield.

== Background ==
This was the twelfth appearance of the event, which is one of 12 athletics events to have been held at every Summer Olympics. Jamaica's team was the same as in 1948: Arthur Wint (London gold medalist), Herb McKenley (silver), and George Rhoden (semifinalist; now also world record holder). The United States had 1948 bronze medalist Mal Whitfield return, this time joined by Gene Cole and future National Football League star Ollie Matson. Australia's finalist from London, Morris Curotta, also returned, making 4 of 6 finalists to come back.

Guatemala, Israel, Pakistan, Puerto Rico, the Soviet Union, Thailand, and Venezuela appeared in this event for the first time. The United States made its twelfth appearance in the event, the only nation to compete in it at every Olympic Games to that point.

== Competition format ==
The competition retained the basic four-round format from 1920, and the only change from 1948 was that the first round heats were larger. There were 12 heats in the first round, each with between 4 and 7 athletes. The top two runners in each heat advanced to the quarterfinals. There were 4 quarterfinals of 6 runners each; the top three athletes in each quarterfinal heat advanced to the semifinals. The semifinals featured 2 heats of 6 runners each. The top two runners in each semifinal heat advanced, making a six-man final.

== Records ==
Prior to the competition, the existing World and Olympic records were as follows.

| World record | George Rhoden (JAM) | 45.9 | Eskilstuna, Sweden | 22 August 1950 |
| Olympic record | Bill Carr (USA) | 46.2 | Los Angeles, United States | 5 August 1932 |

George Rhoden set a new Olympic record at 46.09 seconds in the final.

== Schedule ==
All times are Eastern European Summer Time (UTC+3)

| Date | Time | Round |
|---|---|---|
| Thursday, 24 July 1952 | 15:20; 18:35 | Round 1 Quarterfinals |
| Friday, 25 July 1952 | 15:00; 17:05 | Semifinals; Finals |

== Results ==
=== Heats ===
The fastest two runners in each of the twelve heats advanced to the quarterfinal round.

==== Heat 1 ====
| Rank | Athlete | Nation | Time | Notes |
|---|---|---|---|---|
| 1 | Karl-Friedrich Haas | Germany | 47.58 | Q |
| 2 | Leslie Lewis | Great Britain | 47.95 | Q |
| 3 | Edwin Carr, Jr. | Australia | 48.23 | |
| 4 | Zoltán Adamik | Hungary | 48.70 | |
| 5 | Evelio Planas | Cuba | 49.44 | |
| 6 | Abdul Rehman | Pakistan | 51.47 | |
| - | Vasilios Mavroidis | Greece | DNS | |

==== Heat 2 ====
| Rank | Athlete | Nation | Time | Notes |
|---|---|---|---|---|
| 1 | Ardalion Ignatyev | Soviet Union | 48.22 | Q |
| 2 | Rolf Back | Finland | 48.58 | Q |
| 3 | Rupert Blöch | Austria | 49.82 | |
| 4 | Gérard Rasquin | Luxembourg | 50.12 | |
| 5 | John Anderton | South Africa | 50.35 | |
| 6 | Pongummart Ummarttayakul | Thailand | 53.23 | |

==== Heat 3 ====
| Rank | Athlete | Nation | Time | Notes |
|---|---|---|---|---|
| 1 | Arthur Wint | Jamaica | 47.42 | Q |
| 2 | Jack Carroll | Canada | 48.05 | Q |
| 3 | Egon Solymossy | Hungary | 49.32 | |
| 4 | Josef Steger | Switzerland | 49.35 | |
| 5 | Jaakko Suikkari | Finland | 50.92 | |
| 6 | Aurang Zeb | Pakistan | 51.25 | |
| - | Jimmy Reardon | Ireland | DNS | |

==== Heat 4 ====
| Rank | Athlete | Nation | Time | Notes |
|---|---|---|---|---|
| 1 | Lars-Erik Wolfbrandt | Sweden | 48.57 | Q |
| 2 | Terry Higgins | Great Britain | 48.77 | Q |
| 3 | Junkichi Matoba | Japan | 49.57 | |
| 4 | Vasilios Sillis | Greece | 49.79 | |
| 5 | Doğan Acarbay | Turkey | 50.83 | |
| 6 | Ivan Jacob | India | 51.48 | |
| - | Cirilo McSween | Panama | DNS | |

==== Heat 5 ====
| Rank | Athlete | Nation | Time | Notes |
|---|---|---|---|---|
| 1 | Herb McKenley | Jamaica | 48.09 | Q |
| 2 | Louis van Biljon | South Africa | 48.31 | Q |
| 3 | Roger Moens | Belgium | 48.71 | |
| 4 | Ferenc Bánhalmi | Hungary | 49.55 | |
| 5 | Arie Gill-Glick | Israel | 50.27 | |
| 6 | Ernst von Gunten | Switzerland | 50.88 | |
| — | Tage Ekfeldt | Sweden | DQ | |

==== Heat 6 ====
| Rank | Athlete | Nation | Time | Notes |
|---|---|---|---|---|
| 1 | Mal Whitfield | United States | 48.68 | Q |
| 2 | Guillermo Gutiérrez | Venezuela | 48.82 | Q |
| 3 | Gianni Rocca | Italy | 49.51 | |
| 4 | Gösta Brännström | Sweden | 50.32 | |
| 5 | Javier Souza | Mexico | 50.47 | |
| 6 | Emin Doybak | Turkey | 51.34 | |
| 7 | Fernando Casimiro | Portugal | 52.33 | |

==== Heat 7 ====
| Rank | Athlete | Nation | Time | Notes |
|---|---|---|---|---|
| 1 | Jacques Degats | France | 48.60 | Q |
| 2 | Morris Curotta | Australia | 48.87 | Q |
| 3 | Vincenzo Lombardo | Italy | 49.53 | |
| 4 | Rudolf Haidegger | Austria | 50.01 | |
| 5 | Albert Lowagie | Belgium | 50.26 | |
| - | Knud Schibsbye | Denmark | DNS | |
| - | Sam LaBeach | Panama | DNS | |

==== Heat 8 ====
| Rank | Athlete | Nation | Time | Notes |
|---|---|---|---|---|
| 1 | Hans Geister | Germany | 47.99 | Q |
| 2 | Yves Camus | France | 48.06 | Q |
| 3 | Milan Filo | Czechoslovakia | 48.91 | |
| 4 | Guðmundur Lárusson | Iceland | 49.81 | |
| 5 | Sompop Svadanandana | Thailand | 53.68 | |
| 6 | Jeremías Stokes | Guatemala | 53.81 | |
| - | Gustavo Ehlers | Chile | DNS | |

==== Heat 9 ====
| Rank | Athlete | Nation | Time | Notes |
|---|---|---|---|---|
| 1 | Gene Cole | United States | 48.44 | Q |
| 2 | Alan Dick | Great Britain | 48.84 | Q |
| 3 | Edmunds Pīlāgs | Soviet Union | 49.29 | |
| 4 | Angel García | Cuba | 49.34 | |
| 5 | Antoine Uyterhoeven | Belgium | 50.21 | |
| 6 | Jean Hamilius | Luxembourg | 50.75 | |
| - | José Fórmica | Spain | DNS | |

==== Heat 10 ====
| Rank | Athlete | Nation | Time | Notes |
|---|---|---|---|---|
| 1 | George Rhoden | Jamaica | 48.28 | Q |
| 2 | Gerard Mach | Poland | 48.64 | Q |
| 3 | Paul Dolan | Ireland | 48.81 | |
| 4 | Jean-Pierre Goudeau | France | 48.94 | |
| 5 | Doug Clement | Canada | 50.19 | |
| - | Eom Par-yong | South Korea | DNS | |
| - | Ekrem Koçak | Turkey | DNS | |

==== Heat 11 ====
| Rank | Athlete | Nation | Time | Notes |
|---|---|---|---|---|
| 1 | James Lavery | Canada | 48.47 | Q |
| 2 | Yuriy Lituyev | Soviet Union | 49.01 | Q |
| 3 | Frank Rivera | Puerto Rico | 49.48 | |
| 4 | Antonio Siddi | Italy | 51.03 | |
| - | Clayton Clark | Panama | DNS | |
| - | Eitaro Okano | Japan | DNS | |

==== Heat 12 ====
| Rank | Athlete | Nation | Time | Notes |
|---|---|---|---|---|
| 1 | Ollie Matson | United States | 48.17 | Q |
| 2 | Hans Ernst Schneider | Switzerland | 48.86 | Q |
| 3 | Argemiro Roque | Brazil | 49.05 | |
| 4 | Schalk Booysen | South Africa | 49.17 | |
| 5 | Jiří David | Czechoslovakia | 49.23 | |
| 6 | Fred Hammer | Luxembourg | 49.90 | |
| 7 | Ossi Mildh | Finland | 50.36 | |

=== Quarterfinals ===
The fastest three runners in each of the four heats advanced to the semifinal round. Gerard Mach of Poland and Yuriy Lituyev of the Soviet Union were qualified but did not compete.

==== Quarterfinal 1 ====
| Rank | Athlete | Nation | Time | Notes |
|---|---|---|---|---|
| 1 | Arthur Wint | Jamaica | 46.98 | Q |
| 2 | James Lavery | Canada | 47.67 | Q |
| 3 | Lars-Erik Wolfbrandt | Sweden | 48.08 | Q |
| 4 | Guillermo Gutiérrez | Venezuela | 48.75 | |
| 5 | Leslie Lewis | Great Britain | 49.09 | |
| 6 | Hans Ernst Schneider | Switzerland | 49.32 | |

==== Quarterfinal 2 ====
| Rank | Athlete | Nation | Time | Notes |
|---|---|---|---|---|
| 1 | George Rhoden | Jamaica | 47.24 | Q |
| 2 | Ollie Matson | United States | 47.53 | Q |
| 3 | Karl-Friedrich Haas | Germany | 47.66 | Q |
| 4 | Morris Curotta | Australia | 48.86 | |
| 5 | Rolf Back | Finland | 51.53 | |
| - | Yury Lituyev | Soviet Union | DNS | |

==== Quarterfinal 3 ====
| Rank | Athlete | Nation | Time | Notes |
|---|---|---|---|---|
| 1 | Mal Whitfield | United States | 47.74 | Q |
| 2 | Hans Geister | Germany | 47.81 | Q |
| 3 | Jack Carroll | Canada | 47.82 | Q |
| 4 | Louis van Biljon | South Africa | 48.63 | |
| 5 | Jacques Degats | France | 48.90 | |
| 6 | Alan Dick | Great Britain | 49.20 | |

==== Quarterfinal 4 ====
| Rank | Athlete | Nation | Time | Notes |
|---|---|---|---|---|
| 1 | Herb McKenley | Jamaica | 47.56 | Q |
| 2 | Gene Cole | United States | 47.88 | Q |
| 3 | Ardalion Ignatyev | Soviet Union | 48.25 | Q |
| 4 | Yves Camus | France | 48.43 | |
| 5 | Terry Higgins | Great Britain | 49.22 | |
| - | Gerard Mach | Poland | DNS | |

=== Semifinals ===
The fastest three runners in each of the two heats advanced to the final round.

==== Semifinal 1 ====
| Rank | Athlete | Nation | Time | Notes |
|---|---|---|---|---|
| 1 | Arthur Wint | Jamaica | 46.38 | Q |
| 2 | Karl-Friedrich Haas | Germany | 46.56 | Q |
| 3 | Mal Whitfield | United States | 46.64 | Q |
| 4 | Gene Cole | United States | 46.94 | |
| 5 | Ardalion Ignatyev | Soviet Union | 47.49 | |
| 6 | James Lavery | Canada | 47.83 | |

==== Semifinal 2 ====
| Rank | Athlete | Nation | Time | Notes |
|---|---|---|---|---|
| 1 | Herb McKenley | Jamaica | 46.53 | Q |
| 2 | George Rhoden | Jamaica | 46.61 | Q |
| 3 | Ollie Matson | United States | 46.99 | Q |
| 4 | Hans Geister | Germany | 47.00 | |
| 5 | Jack Carroll | Canada | 47.61 | |
| — | Lars-Erik Wolfbrandt | Sweden | DNS | |

=== Final ===
| Rank | Lane | Athlete | Nation | Time | Notes |
|---|---|---|---|---|---|
| 1st place, gold medalist(s) | 6 | George Rhoden | Jamaica | 46.09 | OR |
| 2nd place, silver medalist(s) | 4 | Herb McKenley | Jamaica | 46.20 | |
| 3rd place, bronze medalist(s) | 5 | Ollie Matson | United States | 46.94 | |
| 4 | 3 | Karl-Friedrich Haas | Germany | 47.22 | |
| 5 | 2 | Arthur Wint | Jamaica | 47.24 | |
| 6 | 1 | Mal Whitfield | United States | 47.30 | |
