= HVK Gusar =

HVK Gusar Split
- Location: Split, Croatia
- Founded: 5 March 1914
- Website: www.hvk-gusar.hr

Notable members
- Duje Bonačić, Igor Boraska, Tihomir Franković, Petar Šegvić, Nikša Skelin, Siniša Skelin, Mate Trojanović, Velimir Valenta

HVK Gusar Split is a rowing club from the city of Split, Croatia. Gusar is Croatian for "pirate". The club is the most successful rowing club in Dalmatia, and arguably in the whole of Croatia. It has a long tradition of success, members of the rowing club VK Gusar won numerous Olympic and World Championship medals.

== History ==
The Club was founded in 1914. The first Gusar "Rowing Home" was near Split's City Port, under the slopes of the Katalinića brig. Later, Gusar moved to a new Home, in the part of the city called Matejuška (in the City Port itself). Several years later, an auxiliary one was made in the city quarter Spinut.

In 1974, the facility in Matejuška was sold, and the Club moved to the Home in Spinut .

== Honours ==
=== Olympics medallists ===
Medal	HVK Gusar members	Games	Event
Gold	Duje Bonačić, Velimir Valenta, Mate Trojanović and Petar Šegvić (coach Davor Jelaska)	1952 Helsinki	Men's coxless fours
Silver	Nikša Skelin and Siniša Skelin (coach Igor Čulin)	2004 Athens	Men's coxless pair
Bronze	Zlatko Celent, Duško Mrduljaš and Josip Reić (coach Tomislav Bilić)	1980 Moscow	Men's coxed pairs
Bronze	Tihomir Franković, Igor Boraska, Siniša Skelin and Nikša Skelin (coach Igor Čulin)	2000 Sydney	Men's eight

=== World Championships medallists ===
Medal	HVK Gusar members	Year / Venue	Event
Gold	Igor Boraska, Tihomir Franković and Milan Ražov (coach Igor Čulin)	1994 Indianapolis	Men's coxed pairs
Silver	Denis Boban, Igor Boraska, Siniša Skelin, Tihomir Franković and Ratko Cvitanić (coach Igor Čulin)	1998 Cologne	Men's four with coxswain
Silver	Damir Vučičić, Igor Boraska, Siniša Skelin and Nikša Skelin	2001 Lucerne	Men's eight
Silver	Siniša Skelin and Nikša Skelin (coach Igor Čulin)	2003 Milan	Men's coxless pair
Bronze	Siniša Skelin and Nikša Skelin (coach Igor Čulin)	2002 Seville	Men's coxless pair
Bronze	Igor Boraska	2002 Seville	Men's four with coxswain

=== European Championships medallists ===
Medal	HVK Gusar members	Year / Venue	Event
Gold	Vjekoslav Rafaelli, Ivo Fabris, Elko Mrduljaš, Jure Mrduljaš, Petar Kukoč, Jakov Tironi, Luka Marasović, Bruno Marasović and Miroslav Kraljević	1932 Belgrade	Men's eight
Silver	Duško Žeželj, Andro Žeželj, Josip Mrklić, Emil Brainović, Petar Kukoč, Josip Gattin, Drago Glavinović, Miho Ljubić and Kamilo Roić	1929 Bydgoszcz	Men's eight
Bronze	Petar Kukoć, Jakov Tironi, Luka Marasović, Bruno Marasović	1932 Belgrade	Men's coxless four
Bronze	Ivo Fabris, Elko Mrduljaš, Hadrijan Peribonio, Slavko Alujević and Mile Alujević	1934 Lucerne	Men's four with coxswain
Bronze	Slavko Alujević, Elko Mrduljaš, Veljko Morović, Jure Ružić and Slavko Rainis	1937 Amsterdam	Men's four with coxswain

== See also ==
- Bogumir Doležal (co-founder of the club)
- HNK Hajduk Split
- RNK Split
