= Croatian House (Split) =

Coordinates: 43°30′35″N 16°26′13″E

- Hrvatski dom
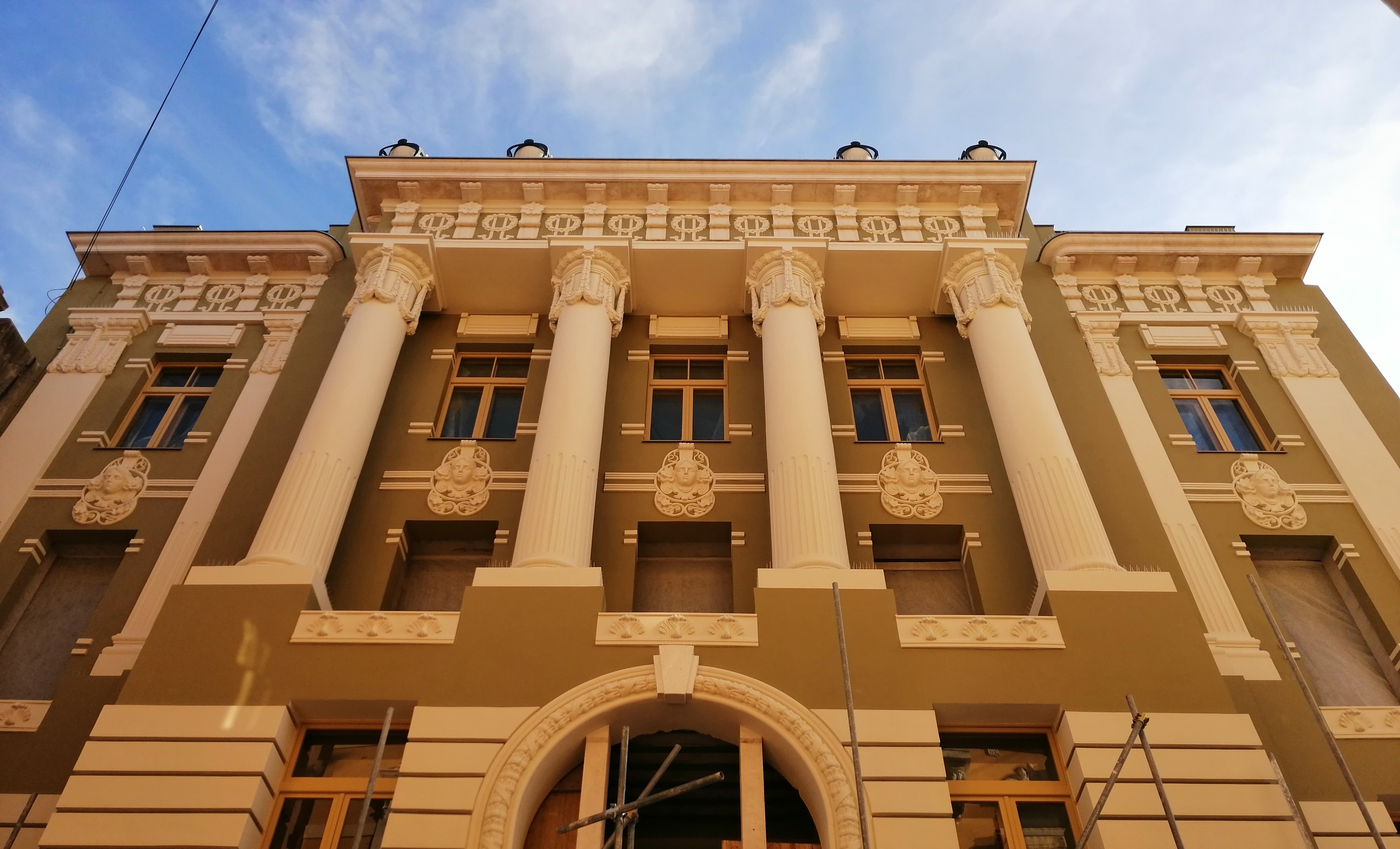
- Croatian House after the renovation in 2019.
- Interactive map of Croatian House
- Address: Tončićeva Street 1 Split, Croatia
- Capacity: 250
- Type: Concert hall

Construction
- Opened: 1908
- Rebuilt: 2019
- Architect: Kamilo Tončić-Sorinj

Website
- www.hdsplit.hr

Cultural Good of Croatia
- Type: Protected cultural good
- Reference no.: Z-4538

Croatian House (Croatian: Hrvatski dom) is a cultural institution in Split, Croatia. It is designated a cultural good of Croatia under the designation Z-4538.

== History ==
The local organization of Croatian Falcon (Croatian: Hrvatski sokol) was founded in 1893 in Split. Its first leader was Vinko (Vicko) Katalinić.

The idea of building the “Croatian Home” emerged in 1896 and its purpose was to gather Split's Croatian-nationalist cultural, artistic, and sports societies. These include: National Reading Room, Slavic Progress, National Music, Volunteer Firefighters, Musical Society “Zvonimir,” as well as gymnastics society “Croatian Falcon”. These Croatian national-oriented organizations promoted the ideas of the Croatian National Revival through their cultural and sports activities, during the struggle for Croatian national affirmation within Austria-Hungary:

- Unification of Kingdom of Dalmatia with remaining Croatian lands (Kingdom of Croatia-Slavonia)
- Croatization of Split municipality
- Resolution of Croatian language issue.

The building is located on the street which still bears the name of its architect - Kamilo Tončić-Sorinj. At the turn of the 20th century, artists who made the cultural and artistic life in Split, gathered around Croatian national party circles, thus bringing the town out of a provincial context and placing it alongside European capitals. The building's design, created in the spirit of Art Nouveau architecture, or Secession, was designed by Kamilo Tončić pl. Sorinj in 1906. It elicited mixed reactions from the public. Nonetheless, his design was kept and finally opened in 1908. It played an important role in the musical life of Split as a gathering place for musicians, a venue for performances, and a concert hall prior to the World War I. The most significant event hosted by Croatian House in its first years of existence was First Dalmatian Art Exhibition, which also inspired the founding of the Croatian Artistic Society Medulić. It also inspired the idea of establishing Gallery of Fine Arts.

The founding assemblies of the following sports clubs were held in the Croatian House:

- In 1911, HNK Hajduk,
- in 1914, VK Gusar
- in 1920, JK Jadran.

After The Great War, in changed political circumstances, Croatian Home lost its pre-war role as an important factor in shaping the musical and artistic life of the city.

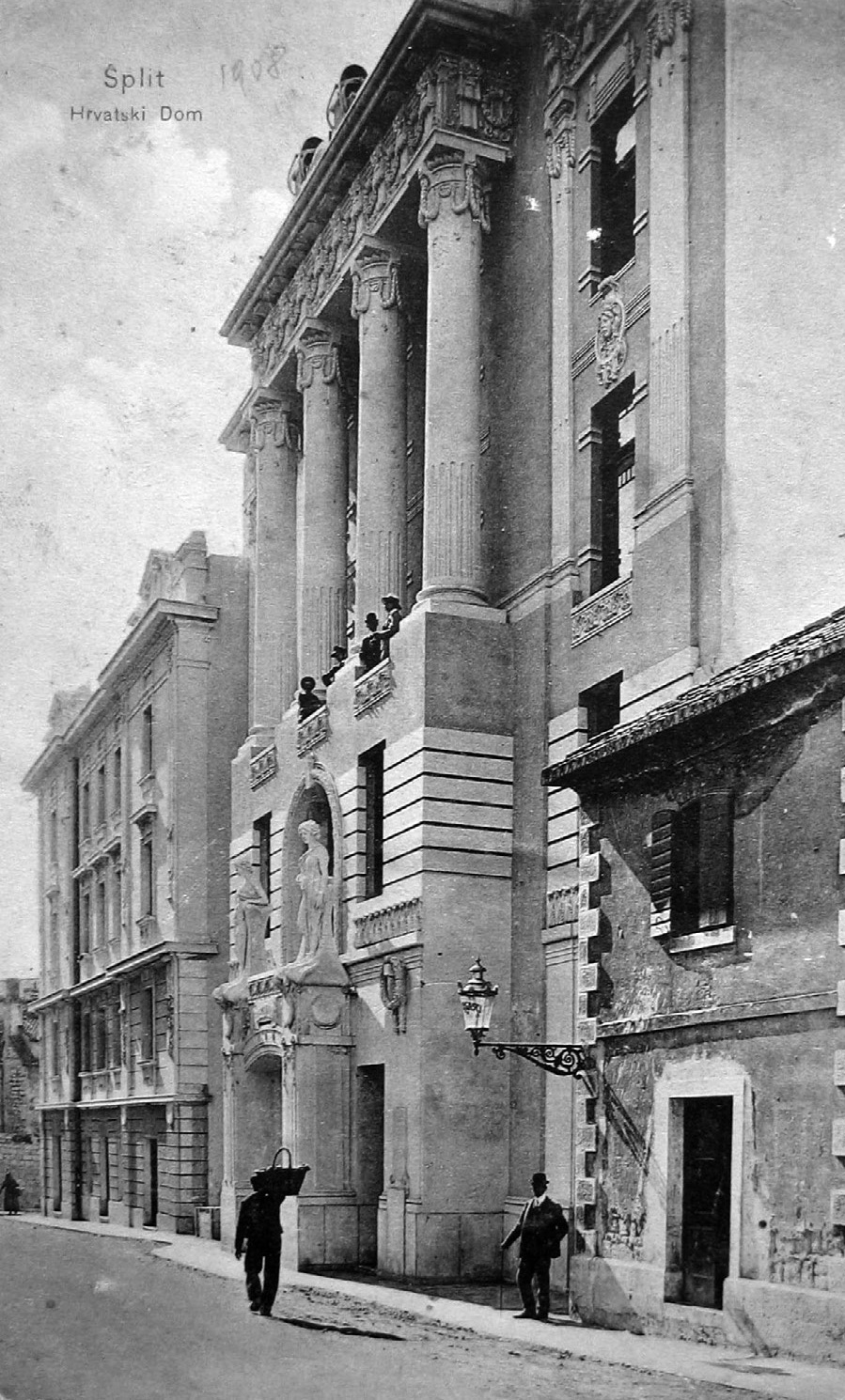
Croatian House at around 1908.

With the introduction of 6 January Dictatorship in 1929, the organization Sokol of the Kingdom of Yugoslavia was established, while all gymnastics societies bearing national names were banned. The Croatian Sokol Federation did not join the newly founded Sokol of the Kingdom of Yugoslavia. Instead, Croatian Sokol decided to disband all Croatian Sokol societies, which were ceremoniously disbanded while playing the Croatian national anthem Lijepa naša. Before that, members took a group photograph together. From that point on, all activities in the Sokol Home took place under the organization and patronage of Sokol as a state sponsored organization.

The most significant event in the work of the Sokol amateur sections was the founding of the Sokol Puppet Theatre in 1933, which operated continuously until 1938. In 1945, in the same house (and partly with the same actors and director), the Puppet Theatre “Pionir” was established.

After the Second World War, the former Croatian, and later Sokol, House was renamed The Home of Youth. In addition to the City Puppet Theatre Split, various sports organizations were allocated space within the building. It is not known what exactly happened in the Sokol Home building at the beginning and during the Second World War, except for the fact that in 1942, during the Italian occupation of the city, the rich Art Nouveau decoration of the main facade and the ceremonial hall was removed.

After the Second World War, the former Croatian (later Sokol) Home was renamed The Home of Youth. In 1951, all pre-war buildings of the Sokol of the Kingdom of Yugoslavia became the property of the Physical Education Society “Partizan.” From then on, the large hall of The Home of Youth, connected to the first-floor space and the “balcony” on part of the second floor in the street-side section of the building, was used for training by the Physical Education Society “Partizan,” the Physical Education Department of the Pedagogical Academy in Split (since its founding in 1974), the Vocational School “Mate Golem,” the Association of the Blind, and the “Hajduk” football players during winter preparations. The rooms on the second floor of the street-side section of the building became offices, while on the third floor they were used as social rooms for DTO “Partizan.”

Between 1965 and 1969, ballerina, choreographer, and ballet educator Franka Hatze-Kuljiš (the niece of composer Josip Hatze) ran her ballet studio on the third floor of the Youth Home.

== Architecture ==
The representative building of the Croatian Home in Art Nouveau style, was designed in the spirit of the Wagner school and its earlier works. It is an original work by a mature architect, where echoes of the classical tradition can be felt alongside the architecture of the modern era. However, it is not only his Art Nouveau idiom that gives the Croatian House special heritage value, but also the events and personalities associated with it, whose importance in the history of the city of Split and Croatian art surpasses the significance of the building itself.

== Renovation and Grand Opening ==
In 2005, during the term of Mayor Zvonimir Puljić, an initiative was launched to restore the Croatian Home to its original appearance. Three cultural professionals were engaged—Zdenka Mišura, then director of the City Puppet Theatre; Nada Kuzmić, a member of the HNK Orchestra; and conservator Sanja Buble. The point was to conceive a project for the building's renovation while modernizing its content. Restoration works began in 2017, and the facade was completed in 2019.

On December 19, 2020, the inaugural concert and grand opening of the Croatian House in Split took place, which had been restored under the watchful eye of conservator Sanja Buble. The building features a concert hall, and the sports tradition has been abandoned.

== Conservation ==
Under the designation Z-4538, it is registered as an immovable cultural property—individual, with legal status as a protected cultural good, classified as secular architectural heritage.

== See also ==
List of concert halls
