= Uyterhoeven =

Uyterhoeven is a surname. Notable people with the surname include:

- Antoine Uyterhoeven (1930–2001), Belgian sprinter
- Erika Uyterhoeven (born 1986), American politician

== See also ==
- Uytterhoeven
