= Portelance =

Portelance is a surname. Notable people with the surname include:

- Arthur Portelance (1928–2008), Canadian businessman and politician
- George Portelance (1931–1952), Canadian swimmer
- Louis Roy Portelance (1764–1838), Canadian businessman and politician
- Luc Portelance, Canada Border Services Agency president and Canadian Security Intelligence Service officer
- Steven Granados-Portelance, Canadian drag queen
