= Shooting at the 1952 Summer Olympics – Men's trap =

Shooting sport at the Olympics

Men's trap at the Games of the XV Olympiad
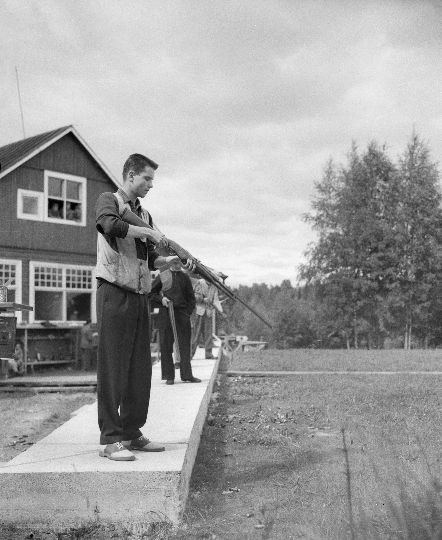
- Gold medalist George Genereux during the competition
- Venue: Helsinki, Finland
- Dates: 25–26 July 1952
- Competitors: 40 from 22 nations
- Winning score: 192 OR

Medalists
| 1st place, gold medalist(s) | | George Genereux | Canada |
| 2nd place, silver medalist(s) | | Knut Holmqvist | Sweden |
| 3rd place, bronze medalist(s) | | Hans Liljedahl | Sweden |

The men's trap was a shooting sports event held as part of the Shooting at the 1952 Summer Olympics programme. It was the sixth appearance of the event. The competition was held on 25 and 26 July 1952 at the shooting ranges in Helsinki. 40 shooters from 22 nations competed. Each nation could have up to 2 shooters. The event was won by George Genereux of Canada, the nation's first victory (and first medal) in the event since 1908. Sweden, which had never before medaled in the men's trap, took two medals this Games, with Knut Holmqvist earning silver and Hans Liljedahl bronze.

== Background ==
Trap shooting is a shooting event which involves using shotguns to shoot clay pigeons. This was the sixth appearance of what had been standardised as the men's ISSF Olympic trap event. The event was held at every Summer Olympics from 1896 to 1924 (except 1904, when no shooting events were held) and from 1952 to 2016. As with most shooting events, it was nominally open to women from 1968 to 1980; the trap remained open to women through 1992. Very few women participated these years. The event returned to being men-only for 1996, though the new double trap had separate events for men and women that year. In 2000, a separate women's event was added and it has been contested at every Games since. There was also a men's team trap event held four times from 1908 to 1924.

None of the shooters from the 1924 Games (the last edition of the trap) returned. The reigning World Champion from the 1952 ISSF World Shooting Championships, Argentina's Pablo Grossi, did not compete in Helsinki; the silver and bronze medalists (17-year-old George Genereux of Canada and Knut Holmqvist of Sweden, respectively) did.

Argentina, Bulgaria, Egypt, Monaco, Poland, Puerto Rico, Soviet Union, and Switzerland each made their debut in the event. Great Britain made its sixth appearance, the only nation to have competed at each edition of the event to that point.

== Competition format ==
The trap competitions prior to World War II had featured 100 target competitions, with winners reaching scores of 98. When trap returned to the Olympics in these Games, it used 200 targets in two courses of 100. Each course consisted of 4 series of 25 targets.

== Records ==
Prior to this competition, the existing world and Olympic records were as follows.

| World record | |
| Olympic record | New format |

George Genereux set the initial Olympic record for the 200-shot event with 192 points.

== Schedule ==
| Date | Time | Round |
|---|---|---|
| Friday, 25 July 1952 | 9:00 | Course 1 |
| Saturday, 26 July 1952 | 9:00 | Course 2 |

== Results ==
The end of the first day had Liljedahl and Aasnæs leading at 96, followed closely by Genereux, Čapek, and Holmqvist at 95. Aasnæs dropped early in the second course. Liljedahl still held the 1-point lead over Genereux and Holmqvist after 150 shots, but Genereux took the lead with a perfect 25-hit series from targets to 151 to 175 while Liljedahl hit only 21. Holmqvist hit 24 during that run, falling behind Genereux by 1 but ahead of Liljedahl by 2. Genereux's 24 out of the last 25 ensured that Liljedahl could not catch him; Holmqvist needed to be perfect to move back up to tied with the Canadian, but only equaled Genereux's 24 in the final 25 shots.

| Rank | Shooter | Nation | Total |
|---|---|---|---|
| 1st place, gold medalist(s) | George Genereux | Canada | 192 |
| 2nd place, silver medalist(s) | Knut Holmqvist | Sweden | 191 |
| 3rd place, bronze medalist(s) | Hans Liljedahl | Sweden | 190 |
| 4 | František Čapek | Czechoslovakia | 188 |
| 5 | Konrad Huber | Finland | 188 |
| 6 | Ioannis Koutsis | Greece | 187 |
| 7 | Galliano Rossini | Italy | 187 |
| 8 | Italo Bellini | Italy | 186 |
| 9 | Józef Kiszkurno | Poland | 185 |
| 10 | Ivan Isayev | Soviet Union | 185 |
| 11 | Hans Aasnæs | Norway | 185 |
| 12 | Seifollah Ghaleb | Egypt | 184 |
| 13 | Roy Cole | Canada | 184 |
| 14 | Enoch Jenkins | Great Britain | 183 |
| 15 | Yury Nikandrov | Soviet Union | 183 |
| 16 | Ivan Ivanov | Bulgaria | 182 |
| 17 | Youssef Fares | Egypt | 181 |
| 18 | André Taupin | France | 181 |
| 19 | Igor Treybal | Czechoslovakia | 181 |
| 20 | Olgierd Darżynkiewicz | Poland | 181 |
| 21 | Albert Fichefet | Belgium | 178 |
| 22 | Laszlo Szapáry | Austria | 178 |
| 23 | Kurt Schöbel | Germany | 175 |
| 24 | Panagiotis Linardakis | Greece | 175 |
| 25 | Juan de Giacomo | Argentina | 175 |
| 26 | Claude Lagarde | France | 173 |
| 27 | Rafael de Juan | Spain | 173 |
| 28 | Gaston Van Roy | Belgium | 169 |
| 29 | Sven-Erik Rosenlew | Finland | 168 |
| 30 | Khristo Shopov | Bulgaria | 168 |
| 31 | Allan Christensen | Denmark | 165 |
| 32 | Georges Robini | Monaco | 165 |
| 33 | Antonio Vega | Spain | 164 |
| 34 | Louis Cavalli | Switzerland | 159 |
| 35 | Charles Lucas | Great Britain | 159 |
| 36 | Pierre-André Flückiger | Switzerland | 159 |
| 37 | Svein Helling | Norway | 148 |
| 38 | Marcel Rué | Monaco | 146 |
| 39 | José Ángel Galiñanes | Puerto Rico | 117 |
| 40 | Fulvio Rocchi | Argentina | 109 |
