= Matoba =

Matoba may refer to:

- Matoba (surname), a Japanese surname
- Matoba Station, a railway station in Kawagoe, Saitama Prefecture, Japan
- Matoba Dam, a dam in Maharashtra, India
