= Antonio Vega =

Antonio Vega may refer to:

- Antonio Vega de Seoane (1887–1943), Spanish mining engineer, businessman, and politician
- Antonio Vega (sport shooter) (1932–2011), Spanish former sport shooter
- Antonio Vega (singer) (1957–2009), Spanish singer
- Antonio Vega Corona, (born 1965), Mexican politician
- Antonio Vega (footballer) (born 1982), Chilean footballer
- Antonio Vega (character), character from the American soap opera One Life to Live, played by Kamar de los Reyes and Robert Montano
