= Shopov =

Shopov (Bulgarian: Шопов) is a Bulgarian male surname, its feminine counterpart is Shopova. It may refer to:

- Atanas Shopov (born 1951), Bulgarian weightlifter
- Hristo Shopov (born 1964), Bulgarian actor
- Khristo Shopov (born 1912), Bulgarian sports shooter
- Naum Shopov (1930–2012), Bulgarian actor
- Petar Shopov (born 1978), Bulgarian football player
- Yanko Shopov (born 1954), Bulgarian Olympic wrestler
