= Kaffka =

Kaffka is a surname. It shares its roots with the Czech Kafka or Kawka. The Kafkas of Moravia who had migrated to Hungary added the second "f" to their name, creating the Hungarian form Kaffka, when they received a patent of nobility in Hungary. Notable people with this surname include:

- Albert Kaffka (1902–1932), Hungarian painter
- Imre Kaffka (1931–2019), Hungarian rower
- Johann Christoph Kaffka (1754–1815), German composer, violinist, and singer
- Joseph Kaffka (1730–1796), Bohemian-German composer and violinist
- Margit Kaffka (1880–1918), Hungarian writer
- Rudolf Kaffka (1923–1985), German theologian and politician
- Sergey Petrovich Kaffka (1869–1929), Russian-Empire hippologist
