= Greece at the 1952 Summer Olympics =

- IOC code: GRE
- NOC: Committee of the Olympic Games

in Helsinki Finland
- Competitors: 48
- Flag bearer: Nikolaos Syllas
- Medals: Gold 0 Silver 0 Bronze 0 Total 0

Summer Olympics appearances (overview)
- 1896; 1900; 1904; 1908; 1912; 1920; 1924; 1928; 1932; 1936; 1948; 1952; 1956; 1960; 1964; 1968; 1972; 1976; 1980; 1984; 1988; 1992; 1996; 2000; 2004; 2008; 2012; 2016; 2020; 2024

Other related appearances
- 1906 Intercalated Games

Greece competed with 48 athletes at the 1952 Summer Olympics in Helsinki, Finland. 48 competitors, all men, took part in 24 events in 7 sports. Greek athletes have competed in every Summer Olympic Games.

== Basketball ==
Men's Team Competition

- Qualification Round (Group B)

- Lost to Hungary (38-75)
- Defeated Israel (54-52)
- Lost to Hungary (44-47) → did not advance

== Rowing ==
Greece had three male rowers participate in one out of seven rowing events in 1952.

Men's coxed pair

- Iraklis Klangas
- Nikos Nikolaou
- Grigorios Emmanouil (cox)

== Shooting ==
Six shooters represented Greece in 1952.

25 m pistol

- Konstantinos Mylonas
- Angelos Papadimas

50 m pistol

- Georgios Stathis

50 m rifle, prone

- Athanasios Aravositas

Trap

- Ioannis Koutsis
- Panagiotis Linardakis
