= José Ángel Galiñanes =

Puerto Rican sports shooter

Personal information
- Born: 12 March 1904 Sabana Grande, Puerto Rico
- Died: September 1973 (aged 69) San Juan, Puerto Rico

Sport
- Sport: Sports shooting

José Ángel Galiñanes (12 March 1904 – September 1973) was a Puerto Rican sports shooter. He competed in the trap event at the 1952 Summer Olympics.
