= Gennady Slepnyov =

Soviet sprinter (1921–2002)

Personal information
- Nationality: Soviet
- Born: 21 July 1921 Teykovo, Russian SFSR
- Died: 9 August 2002 (aged 81)

Sport
- Sport: Sprinting
- Event: 4 × 400 metres relay

Gennady Slepnyov (21 July 1921 – 9 August 2002) was a Soviet sprinter. He competed in the men's 4 × 400 metres relay at the 1952 Summer Olympics.
