= Ivan Makarov (rower) =

Soviet rower (born 1930)

Personal information
- Nationality: Soviet
- Born: 1930

Sport
- Sport: Rowing

Ivan Makarov (born 1930) is a Soviet rower. He competed in the men's coxless four event at the 1952 Summer Olympics.
