= Achim Krause-Wichmann =

German rower (1930–2000)

Personal information
- Full name: Joachim Krause-Wichmann
- Nationality: German
- Born: 27 May 1930 Trier, Germany
- Died: 7 July 2000 (aged 70) Saarbrücken, Germany

Sport
- Sport: Rowing

Joachim Krause-Wichmann (27 May 1930 – 7 July 2000) was a German rower. He competed in the men's coxless four event at the 1952 Summer Olympics, representing Saar.
