= Carl Nielsen (rower) =

Danish rower (1930–1991)

Personal information
- Born: Carl Rosenlund Nielsen; 5 January 1930 Aarhus, Denmark
- Died: 29 June 1991 (aged 61)

Sport
- Sport: Rowing
Medal record
Men's rowing
Representing Denmark
European Rowing Championships
Silver medal – second place	1951 Mâcon	Coxless four

Carl Rosenlund Nielsen (5 January 1930 – 29 June 1991) was a Danish rower. He competed at the 1952 Summer Olympics in Helsinki with the men's coxless four where they were eliminated in the round one repêchage.
