= Rowing at the 1952 Summer Olympics – Men's coxless four =

Men's coxless four at the Games of the XV Olympiad
- Date: 20–23 July 1952
- Competitors: 68 from 17 nations

Medalists
1st place, gold medalist(s)		Duje Bonačić; Velimir Valenta; Mate Trojanović; Petar Šegvić	Yugoslavia
2nd place, silver medalist(s)		Pierre Blondiaux; Jean-Jacques Guissart; Marc Bouissou; Roger Gautier	France
3rd place, bronze medalist(s)		Veikko Lommi; Kauko Wahlsten; Oiva Lommi; Lauri Nevalainen	Finland

The men's coxless four competition at the 1952 Summer Olympics took place at Meilahti, Finland.

== Results ==
The following rowers took part:

Rank	Rowers	Country
1st place, gold medalist(s)	Duje Bonačić; Velimir Valenta; Mate Trojanović; Petar Šegvić	Yugoslavia
2nd place, silver medalist(s)	Pierre Blondiaux; Jean-Jacques Guissart; Marc Bouissou; Roger Gautier	France
3rd place, bronze medalist(s)	Veikko Lommi; Kauko Wahlsten; Oiva Lommi; Lauri Nevalainen	Finland
	Harry Almond; John Jones; James Crowden; Adrian Cadbury	Great Britain
	Edward Schwarzer; Zbigniew Schwarzer; Henryk Jagodziński; Zbigniew Żarnowiecki	Poland
	Roman Zakharov; Yury Rogozov; Ivan Makarov; Vladimir Kirsanov	Soviet Union
	Giuseppe Moioli; Elio Morille; Giovanni Invernizzi; Franco Faggi	Italy
	Werner Biel; Hans Krause-Wichmann; Achim Krause-Wichmann; Hanns Peters	Saar
	Sverre Kråkenes; Kristoffer Lepsøe; Thorstein Kråkenes; Harald Kråkenes	Norway
	Louis McMillan; Dempster Jackson; John Davis; James Welsh	United States
	Kurt Marz; Alexander Mitterhuber; Adolf Scheithauer; Johann Geiszler	Austria
	Charles Van Antwerpen; Jos Rosa; Harry Elzendoorn; Florent Caers	Belgium
	Knud Bruun Jensen; Carl Nielsen; Harry Nielsen; Paul Locht	Denmark
	László Decker; Imre Kaffka; János Hollósi; Imre Kemény	Hungary
	Frits de Voogt; Ruud Sesink Clee; Jan op den Velde; Kees van Vugt	Netherlands
	Don Dyke-Wells; Damian Nichol; John Webb; Christopher Veitch	South Africa
	Ron Cameron; Lloyd Montour; Jack Zwirewich; Art Griffiths	Canada
