= Werner Biel =

German rower (1927–2006)

Personal information
- Nationality: German
- Born: 25 November 1927 Saarbrücken, Germany
- Died: 16 January 2006 (aged 78) Riegelsberg, Germany

Sport
- Sport: Rowing

Werner Erich Biel (25 November 1927 – 16 January 2006) was a German rower. He competed in the men's coxless four event at the 1952 Summer Olympics, representing Saar.
