= Knut Holmqvist =

Swedish sport shooter (1918–2000)

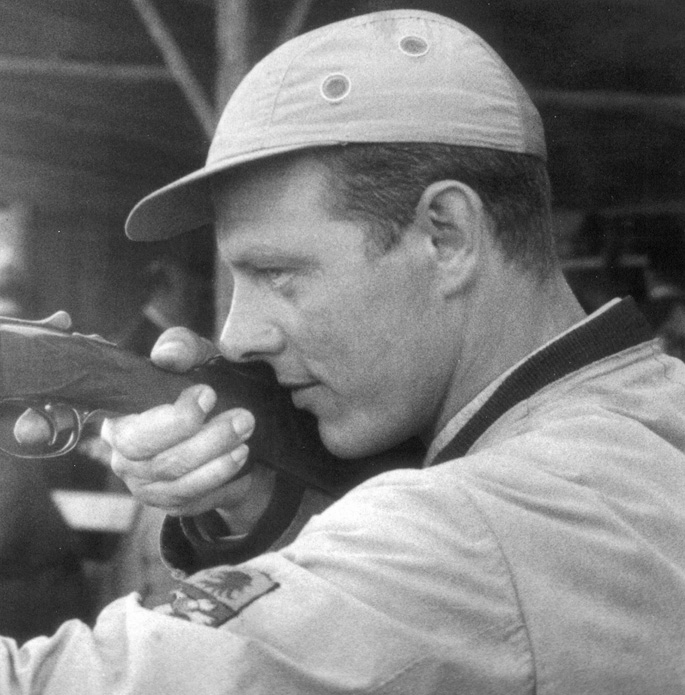

Personal information
- Born: 15 July 1918 Trollenäs, Sweden
- Died: 28 August 2000 (aged 82) Rydsgård, Sweden

Sport
- Sport: Sport shooting
- Event: Olympic trap
- Club: Skånes JSK, Malmö
Medal record
Representing Sweden
Olympic Games
Silver medal – second place	1952 Helsinki	Trap, individual
World championships
Gold medal – first place	1952 Oslo	Trap, team
Bronze medal – third place	1952 Oslo	Trap, individual

Knut Holmqvist (15 July 1918 – 28 August 2000) was a Swedish sport shooter. He competed in trap shooting at the 1952 and 1956 Olympics and finished in second and seventh place, respectively. He won a team gold and an individual bronze medal at the 1952 World Championships.
