= Ruud Sesink Clee =

Dutch rower

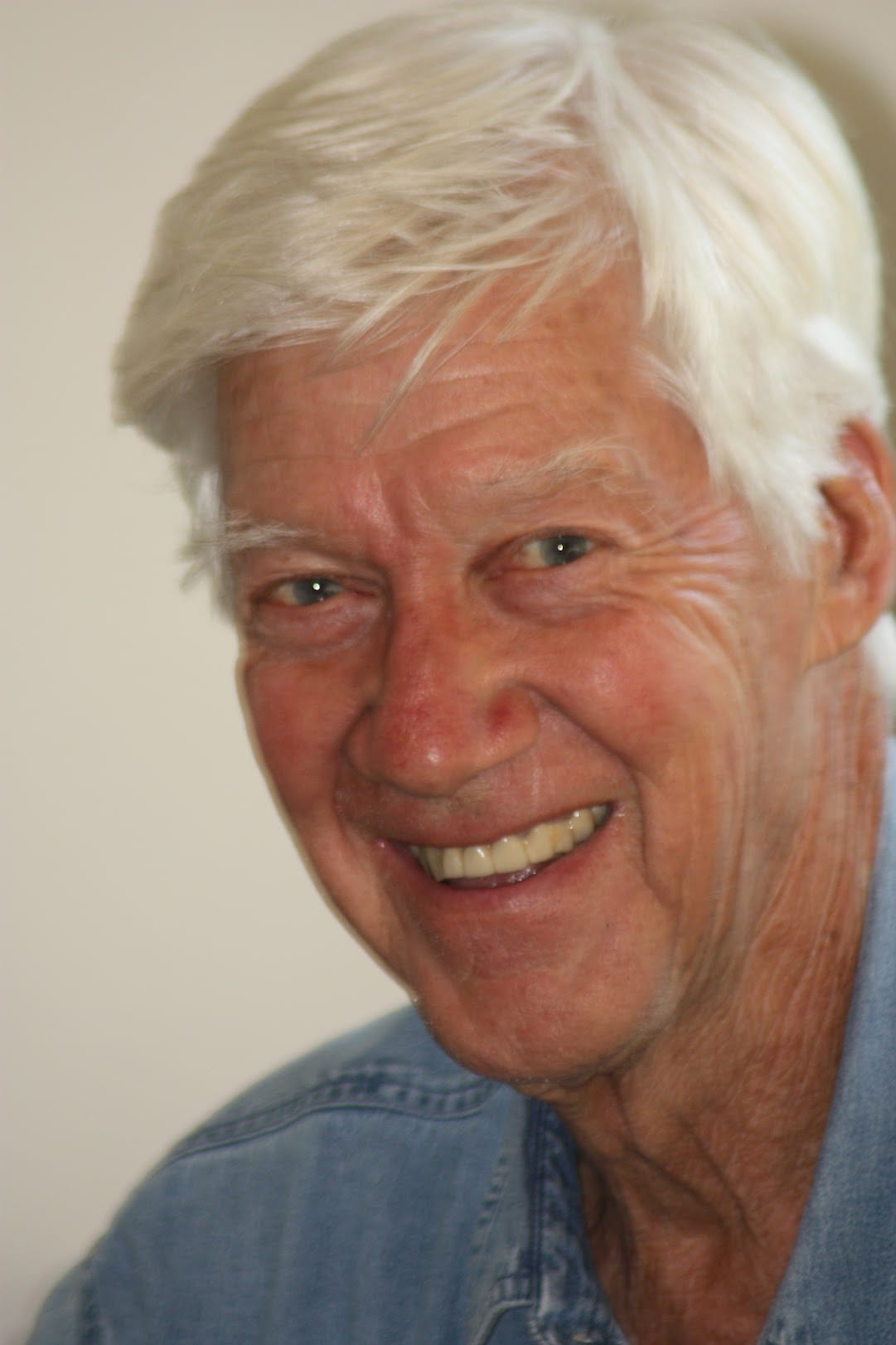
- Ruud Sesink Clee in summer of 2009

Personal information
- Nationality: Dutch
- Born: 24 July 1931; The Hague, Netherlands
- Died: 31 July 2015 (aged 84)

Sport
- Sport: Rowing

Ruud Sesink Clee (24 July 1931 – 31 July 2015) was a Dutch rower. He competed in the men's coxless four event at the 1952 Summer Olympics.
