= Marc Bouissou =

French rower (1931–2018)

Personal information
- Born: Marc Émile Bouissou; 6 April 1931 Joinville-le-Pont
- Died: 23 November 2018 (aged 87)

Sport
- Sport: Rowing
Medal record
Men's rowing
Representing France
Olympic Games
Silver medal – second place	1952 Helsinki	Coxless four
European Rowing Championships
Bronze medal – third place	1953 Copenhagen	Eight

Marc Émile Bouissou (6 April 1931 – 23 November 2018) was a French rower who competed in the 1952 Summer Olympics. In 1952 he was a crew member of the French boat which won the silver medal in the coxless four event.
