= Roger Gautier =

French rower (1922–2011)

Personal information
- Born: 11 July 1922
- Died: 1 March 2011 (aged 88) Nîmes

Sport
- Sport: Rowing
Medal record
Men's rowing
Representing France
Olympic Games
Silver medal – second place	1952 Helsinki	Coxless four
European Rowing Championships
Bronze medal – third place	1953 Copenhagen	Eight

Roger Gautier (11 July 1922 – 1 March 2011) was a French rower who competed in the 1952 Summer Olympics.

In 1952 he was a crew member of the French boat which won the silver medal in the coxless four event.
