= Lauri Nevalainen =

Finnish rower

Olympic medal record

Men's rowing
Bronze medal – third place	1952 Helsinki	Coxless four

Lauri Armas Nevalainen (24 January 1927 – 31 July 2005) was a Finnish rower who competed in the 1952 Summer Olympics.

He was born and died in Kotka.

In 1952, he was a crew member of the Finnish boat which won the bronze medal in the coxless fours event.
