= Harry Nielsen (rower) =

Danish rower (born 1930)

Personal information
- Born: Harry Christian Lund Nielsen; 31 October 1930 (age 95) Aarhus, Denmark

Sport
- Sport: Rowing
Medal record
Men's rowing
Representing Denmark
European Rowing Championships
Silver medal – second place	1951 Mâcon	Coxless four

Harry Christian Lund Nielsen (born 31 October 1930) is a Danish rower. He competed at the 1952 Summer Olympics in Helsinki with the men's coxless four where they were eliminated in the round one repêchage.
