= Paul Stalder =

Swiss sprinter

Personal information
- Nationality: Swiss
- Born: 20 January 1930
- Died: 7 May 2014 (aged 84)

Sport
- Sport: Sprinting
- Event: 4 × 400 metres relay

Paul Stalder (20 January 1930 – 7 May 2014) was a Swiss sprinter. He competed in the men's 4 × 400 metres relay at the 1952 Summer Olympics.
