= Dempster Jackson =

American rower

Personal information
- Born: November 17, 1930 San Diego, California, United States
- Died: April 3, 2001 (aged 70) Arlington, Virginia, United States

Sport
- Sport: Rowing

Dempster Jackson (November 17, 1930 – April 3, 2001) was an American rower. He competed in the men's coxless four event at the 1952 Summer Olympics.
