= Hans Krause-Wichmann =

German rower (1925–2007)

Personal information
- Nationality: German
- Born: 28 August 1925 Karlsruhe, Germany
- Died: 22 June 2007 (aged 81) Saarbrücken, Germany

Sport
- Sport: Rowing

Hans Krause-Wichmann (28 August 1925 – 22 June 2007) was a German rower. He competed in the men's coxless four event at the 1952 Summer Olympics, representing Saar.
