= Georges Robini =

Monegasque sports shooter (1913–2003)

Personal information
- Born: 6 September 1913 Monaco
- Died: 22 July 2003 (aged 89) Nice, France

Sport
- Sport: Sports shooting

Georges Robini (6 September 1913 – 22 July 2003) was a Monegasque sports shooter. He competed in the trap event at the 1952 Summer Olympics.
