= Hiroshi Yamamoto (sprinter) =

Japanese sprinter

Personal information
- Nationality: Japanese
- Born: 6 May 1928
- Died: 1990-1991

Sport
- Sport: Sprinting
- Event: 4 × 400 metres relay

Hiroshi Yamamoto (山本 弘一, Yamamoto Hiroshi) (6 May 1928 – 1990/1991) was a Japanese sprinter. He attended Konan University prior to his involvement in athletics. He later competed in the men's 4 × 400 metres relay at the 1952 Summer Olympics. Yamamoto died at the age of 62.
