= Florent Caers =

Belgian rower (1928–2024)

Personal information
- Nationality: Belgian
- Born: 17 November 1928 Antwerp, Belgium
- Died: 19 September 2024 (aged 95)

Sport
- Sport: Rowing

Florent Caers (17 November 1928 – 19 September 2024) was a Belgian rower. He competed in the men's coxless four event at the 1952 Summer Olympics.

Caers died on 19 September 2024, at the age of 95.
