= Jean-Jacques Guissart =

French rower (1927–2008)

Personal information
- Born: 5 August 1927 Nogent-sur-Marne
- Died: 14 September 2008 (aged 81) Cannes

Sport
- Sport: Rowing
Medal record
Men's rowing
Representing France
Olympic Games
| Silver medal – second place | 1952 Helsinki | Coxless four |
European Rowing Championships
| Bronze medal – third place | 1951 Mâcon | Coxless four |
| Bronze medal – third place | 1953 Copenhagen | Eight |

Jean-Jacques Guissart (5 August 1927 – 14 September 2008) was a French rower who competed in the 1952 Summer Olympics.

In 1952, he was a crew member of the French boat which won the silver medal in the coxless four event.
