= Gaston Van Roy =

Belgian sports shooter

Personal information
- Born: 9 February 1916 The Hague, Netherlands
- Died: 6 December 1989 (aged 73)

Sport
- Sport: Sports shooting

Gaston Van Roy (9 February 1916 – 6 December 1989) was a Belgian sports shooter. He competed in the trap event at the 1952 Summer Olympics.
