= Sven-Erik Rosenlew =

Finnish sports shooter

Personal information
- Born: 28 December 1902 Helsinki, Finland
- Died: 30 July 1963 (aged 60) Pori, Finland

Sport
- Sport: Sports shooting

Sven-Erik Rosenlew (28 December 1902 – 30 July 1963) was a Finnish sports shooter. He competed in the trap event at the 1952 Summer Olympics.
