= Vladimir Kirsanov (rower) =

Soviet rower

Personal information
- Born: 1929
- Died: 1995 (aged 65–66)

Sport
- Sport: Rowing

Vladimir Aleksandrovich Kirsanov (Russian: Владимир Александрович Кирсанов; 1929–1995) was a Russian rower who represented the Soviet Union. He competed at the 1952 Summer Olympics in Helsinki with the men's coxless four where they were eliminated in the semi-final repechage.
