= Olgierd Darżynkiewicz =

Polish sports shooter

- Born: 8 March 1923; Dojlidy, Second Polish Republic
- Died: 28 February 2000 (aged 76); Warsaw, Poland
- Burial place: Powązki Military Cemetery
- Military career
- Allegiance: Polish People's Republic
- Branch: Polish People's Army; Milicja Obywatelska
- Service years: 1943–1990
- Rank: Generał brygady (Brigadier general)
- Units: 1st Tadeusz Kościuszko Infantry Division; 1st Polish Army; Government Protection Bureau
- Commands: Commander of the Government Protection Bureau
- Conflicts: Second World War
- Awards
- Other work: sport schooting

Olgierd Darżynkiewicz (8 March 1923 – 28 February 2000) was a Polish sports shooter and brigadier general of Milicja Obywatelska. He competed in the trap event at the 1952 Summer Olympics.

== Biography ==
=== Military career ===
In May 1943 he joined the 1st Tadeusz Kościuszko Infantry Division. He took part in the battle of Lenino, then he went through the entire combat trail of the 1st Polish Army. After the war, in the years 1945-1947 he took part in combating the armed underground and Ukrainian Insurgent Army units. From February to September 1946 he took part in a course for officers of Main Directorate of Information of the Polish Army. Long-time officer of the Directorate II of the General Staff of the Polish Army. In August 1975 he completed a course at the Diplomatic Academy in the USSR. From December 1981 to January 1983 deputy director, and from 14 January 1983 to 1 July 1989 director of the Government Protection Bureau. In October 1984, by resolution of the State Council of the Polish People's Republic, he was promoted to the rank of Brigadier General of the Milicja Obywatelska. The act of nomination was presented to him in the Belweder Palace on 10 October 1984 by the chairman of the Council of State of the Polish People's Republic, Prof. Henryk Jabłoński. From September 1989 to March 1990 he worked at the Consulate General of the Polish People's Republic in Minsk. In April 1990 he retired.

=== Sports career ===
In the years 1950–1968 he was a member of Legia Warsaw sport club. During this time he was the Polish champion four times (1952, 1957–1959) in trap shooting. He represented Poland at 1952 Summer Olympics in Helsinki, taking 20th place.

== Awards and decorations ==
- Silver Cross of Virtuti Militari
- Officer's Cross of the Order of Polonia Restituta
- Knight's Cross of the Order of Polonia Restituta
- Gold Cross of Merit
- Medal for Long Marital Life (18 June 1999)
- Medal of Ludwik Waryński (1988)
