= Louis Cavalli =

Swiss sports shooter

Personal information
- Born: 10 March 1907
- Died: 6 May 1975 (aged 68) Intragna, Switzerland

Sport
- Sport: Sports shooting

Louis Cavalli (10 March 1907 – 6 May 1975) was a Swiss sports shooter. He competed in the trap event at the 1952 Summer Olympics.
