= André Taupin =

French sports shooter

André Gabriel Taupin
Personal information
- Born: 26 July 1909 Fourchambault, France
- Died: 4 March 1979 (aged 69) Nevers, France

Sport
- Sport: Sports shooting

André Taupin (26 July 1909 – 4 March 1979) was a French sports shooter. He competed in the trap event at the 1952 Summer Olympics.
