= Thailand at the 1952 Summer Olympics =

- IOC code: THA
- NOC: National Olympic Committee of Thailand

in Helsinki
- Medals: Gold 0 Silver 0 Bronze 0 Total 0

Summer Olympics appearances (overview)
- 1952; 1956; 1960; 1964; 1968; 1972; 1976; 1980; 1984; 1988; 1992; 1996; 2000; 2004; 2008; 2012; 2016; 2020; 2024

Thailand competed in the Summer Olympic Games for the first time at the 1952 Summer Olympics in Helsinki, Finland. It sent a delegation of eleven athletes, who competed only in the men's track-and-field event.

The eight competitors (with three substitutes in addition) were: Adul Wanasatith, Boonterm Pakpuang, Arun Sankosik, Pongummart Ummarttayakul, Sompop Svadanandana, Boonpak Kwancharoen, Satid Leangtanom, and Kamtorn Sanidwong. They competed in the men's 100 metres, 200 metres, 400 metres, 800 metres, 1500 metres, 4 × 100 metres relay, 4 × 400 metres relay, high jump, long jump, and triple jump.
