= Harry Elzendoorn =

Belgian rower

Personal information
- Nationality: Belgian
- Born: 17 March 1929; Antwerp, Belgium
- Died: 2008 (aged 78–79)

Sport
- Sport: Rowing

Harry Elzendoorn (17 March 1929 – 2008) is a Belgian rower. He competed in the men's coxless four event at the 1952 Summer Olympics.
