= Kauko Wahlsten =

Finnish rower

Olympic medal record

Men's rowing
Bronze medal – third place	1952 Helsinki	Coxless four

Kauko Wilhelm Wahlsten (9 December 1923 – 9 May 2001) was a Finnish rower who competed in the 1952 Summer Olympics.

He was born in Kymi, Kymenlaakso and died in Kotka.

In 1952 he was a crew member of the Finnish boat which won the bronze medal in the coxless fours event.
