= Claude Lagarde =

French sports shooter

Personal information
- Born: 21 June 1895
- Died: 20 July 1983 (aged 88)

Sport
- Sport: Sports shooting

Claude Lagarde (21 June 1895 – 20 July 1983) was a French sports shooter. He competed in the trap event at the 1952 Summer Olympics.
