= Svein Helling =

Norwegian sports shooter (1910–1978)

Personal information
- Born: 31 July 1910 Drammen, Norway
- Died: 16 January 1978 (aged 67) Drammen, Norway

Sport
- Sport: Sports shooting

Svein Helling (31 July 1910 – 16 January 1978) was a Norwegian sports shooter. He competed in the trap event at the 1952 Summer Olympics.
