= Charles Lucas (sport shooter) =

British sports shooter

Personal information
- Born: 18 July 1884 Leeds, England
- Died: 3 November 1975 (aged 91)

Sport
- Sport: Sports shooting

Charles Lucas (18 July 1884 – 3 November 1975) was a British sports shooter. He competed in the trap event at the 1952 Summer Olympics.
