= Hanns Peters =

German rower

Personal information
- Nationality: German
- Born: 13 January 1930; Saarbrücken, Germany
- Died: 31 March 2015 (aged 85); Munich, Germany

Sport
- Sport: Rowing

Hanns Peters (13 January 1930 – 31 March 2015) was a German rower. He competed in the men's coxless four event at the 1952 Summer Olympics, representing Saar.
