= Paul Locht =

Danish rower (1929–2023)

Personal information
- Born: 13 October 1929 Aarhus, Denmark
- Died: 9 March 2023 (aged 93)

Sport
- Sport: Rowing
Medal record
Men's rowing
Representing Denmark
European Rowing Championships
Silver medal – second place	1951 Mâcon	Coxless four

Paul Locht (13 October 1929 – 9 March 2023) was a Danish rower. He competed at the 1952 Summer Olympics in Helsinki with the men's coxless four where they were eliminated in the round one repêchage. Locht died on 9 March 2023, at the age of 93.
