= Uytterhoeven =

Uytterhoeven is a surname. Notable people with the surname include:

- Mark Uytterhoeven (born 1957), Belgian television presenter
- Pierre Uytterhoeven (fl. 1966–1986), Belgian screenwriter

== See also ==
- Uyterhoeven
