= Ivan Isayev =

Soviet sports shooter (born 1927)

Personal information
- Born: 1927

Sport
- Sport: Sports shooting

Ivan Isayev (born 1927) is a Soviet former sports shooter. He competed in the trap event at the 1952 Summer Olympics.
