= László Decker =

Hungarian rower

Personal information
- Nationality: Hungarian
- Born: 12 March 1923; Budapest, Hungary
- Died: 19 May 1998 (aged 75)

Sport
- Sport: Rowing

László Decker (12 March 1923 – 19 May 1998) was a Hungarian rower. He competed in the men's coxless four event at the 1952 Summer Olympics.
