= James Welsh (rower) =

American rower

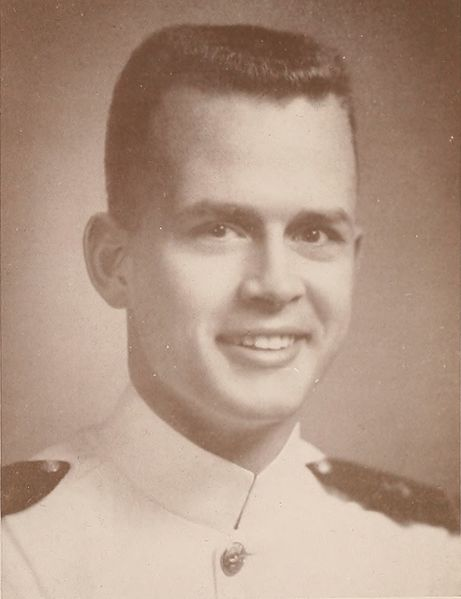
- Welsh in 1953

Personal information
- Full name: James Carter Welsh
- Born: May 8, 1931; Harvey, Illinois, United States
- Died: December 23, 1963 (aged 32); Clark Air Base, Philippines

Sport
- Sport: Rowing

James Carter Welsh (May 8, 1931 – December 23, 1963) was an American rower. He competed in the men's coxless four event at the 1952 Summer Olympics.

== Personal life ==
Welsh graduated from the United States Naval Academy in 1953 and rose to the rank of captain. On December 23, 1963, he died of injuries sustained in the crash of a U-6A Beaver.
