= Arun Sankosik =

Thai sprinter

Personal information
- Nationality: Thai
- Born: 8 May 1925 Sena district, Ayutthaya

Sport
- Sport: Rugby, football, athletics

Arun Sankosik (Thai: อรุณ แสนโกศิก; 8 May 1925 – before 2007) was a Thai athlete and sports coach. He was best known as a rugby player, playing several international events with the Thai national team and becoming its first coach in 1954. He was a member of the board of the Thai Rugby Union as well as its head coach, and also played football and athletics, competing in the men's 100 metres event at Thailand's first Summer Olympics, Helsinki 1952. He worked as a teacher at Vajiravudh College, serving as housemaster of Chitralada House and the school's head rugby coach, until his retirement in 1986.
