= Matoba (surname) =

Matoba (written: 的場) is a Japanese surname. Notable people with the surname include:

- Chise Matoba (的場 ちせ, born 1948), also known as Sachi Hamano, Japanese film director
- Junkichi Matoba (的場 淳吉, born 1931), Japanese sprinter
- Koji Matoba (的場 浩司, born 1969), Japanese actor and television personality
- Naoki Matoba (的場 直樹, born 1977), Japanese baseball player

== Fictional characters ==
- Seiji Matoba (的場 静司), a supporting character and main antagonist in the ongoing manga/anime series Natsume's Book of Friends
- Nanase Matoba, supporting character and secretary to the character stated above.
