= Roman Zakharov =

Soviet rower (1929–2021)

Personal information
- Born: 11 July 1929; Saint Petersburg, Russia
- Died: 14 January 2021 (aged 91)

Sport
- Sport: Rowing

Roman Pavlovich Zakharov (Russian: Роман Павлович Захаров; 11 July 1929 – 14 January 2021) was a Russian rower who represented the Soviet Union. He competed at the 1952 Summer Olympics in Helsinki with the men's coxless four where they were eliminated in the semi-final repêchage.
