= Louis McMillan =

American rower

Personal information
- Nationality: American
- Born: February 8, 1929 Little Rock, Arkansas, United States
- Died: September 13, 2012 (aged 83) Destin, Florida, United States

Sport
- Sport: Rowing

Louis McMillan (February 8, 1929 – September 13, 2012) was an American rower. He competed in the men's coxless four event at the 1952 Summer Olympics.
