= Albert Fichefet =

Belgian sports shooter (born 1903)

Personal information
- Born: 22 June 1903 Jemeppe-sur-Sambre, Belgium
- Died: 23 August 1967 (aged 64)

Sport
- Sport: Sports shooting

Albert Modeste Émile François Simon Fichefet (22 June 1903 – 23 August 1967) was a Belgian sports shooter. He competed in the trap event at the 1952 Summer Olympics.
