= Pierre Blondiaux =

French rower (1922–2003)

Personal information
- Born: Pierre Auguste Blondiaux; 23 January 1922 Paris
- Died: 14 April 2003 (aged 81) Nice

Sport
- Sport: Rowing
Medal record
Men's rowing
Representing France
Olympic Games
Silver medal – second place	1952 Helsinki	Coxless four
European Rowing Championships
Bronze medal – third place	1951 Mâcon	Coxless four
Bronze medal – third place	1953 Copenhagen	Eight

Pierre Auguste Blondiaux (23 January 1922 – 14 April 2003) was a French rower who competed in the 1952 Summer Olympics.

In 1952 he was a crew member of the French boat which won the silver medal in the coxless four event.
