= Gene Cole =

American sprinter

Personal information
- Full name: Gerrard Eugene Cole
- Born: February 18, 1928 New Lexington, Ohio, U.S.
- Died: January 11, 2018 (aged 89)
Medal record
Men's athletics
Representing the United States
Olympic Games
Silver medal – second place	1952 Helsinki	4x400 metres relay

Gerrard Eugene Cole (February 18, 1928 – January 11, 2018) was an American athlete who competed mainly in the 400 metres.

Born in New Lexington, Ohio, Gene Cole attended Lancaster High School. He competed for the United States in the 1952 Summer Olympics held in Helsinki, Finland in the 4 x 400 metre relay where he won the silver medal with his teammates 400 metres bronze medalist Ollie Matson, Charles Moore and Mal Whitfield.
