= Knud Bruun Jensen =

Danish rower (1929–2015)

Personal information
- Nationality: Danish
- Born: 2 July 1929 Aarhus, Denmark
- Died: 21 April 2015 (aged 85)

Sport
- Sport: Rowing

Knud Bruun Jensen (2 July 1929 – 21 April 2015) was a Danish rower. He competed in the men's coxless four event at the 1952 Summer Olympics. Jensen died in April 2015, at the age of 85.
