= János Hollósi =

Hungarian rower

Personal information
- Nationality: Hungarian
- Born: 1923

Sport
- Sport: Rowing

János Hollósi (born 1923, date of death unknown) was a Hungarian rower. He competed in the men's coxless four event at the 1952 Summer Olympics.
