= Youssef Fares (sport shooter) =

Egyptian sports shooter

Personal information
- Born: 1906

Sport
- Sport: Sports shooting

Youssef Fares (born 1906, date of death unknown) was an Egyptian sports shooter. He competed in the trap event at the 1952 Summer Olympics.

Fares won two Egyptian national trap shooting championships and was an Egyptian national clay pigeon shooting champion. He was a medalist at the Mediterranean Games in 1951, at the World Shooting Championships in 1952, and was one of two Egyptians who participated at the 1934 World Championships.
