= Ivan Ivanov (sport shooter) =

Sports shooter

Personal information
- Full name: Ivan Tsvetkov Ivanov
- Born: 6 December 1921

Sport
- Sport: Sports shooting

Ivan Ivanov (Bulgarian: Иван Иванов, born 6 December 1921, date of death unknown) was a Bulgarian sports shooter. He competed in the trap event at the 1952 Summer Olympics.
