= John Davis (rower) =

American rower

Personal information
- Born: June 18, 1929 Santa Monica, California, United States
- Died: March 2017 (aged 87)

Sport
- Sport: Rowing

John Davis (June 18, 1929 – March 2017) was an American rower. He competed in the men's coxless four event at the 1952 Summer Olympics.
