= Kees van Vugt =

Dutch rower

Personal information
- Nationality: Dutch
- Born: 8 December 1929; Jakarta, Dutch East Indies
- Died: 24 March 2015 (aged 85); Reeuwijk, Netherlands

Sport
- Sport: Rowing

Kees van Vugt (8 December 1929 – 24 March 2015) was a Dutch rower. He competed in the men's coxless four event at the 1952 Summer Olympics.
