= Ferd Hayward =

Canadian racewalker

Harry Ferdinand Hayward (August 21, 1911 – September 12, 1988) was a Canadian short- and long-distance walker, who in 1952 competed with the Canadian national team at the Olympics held at Helsinki, Finland. He was born in St. John's, Newfoundland.

Hayward held the Newfoundland record for one-mile, ten-mile and twenty-mile distance walker. He participated at many North American sporting events where he received the Gold Medal at the United States National Kilometre Walking Champ race held at Baltimore.

Hayward was one of the first inductees into the Sport Newfoundland and Labrador Hall of Fame on April 27, 1974. He was also the first recipient of Newfoundland Athlete of the Year award when it was instituted in 1951. The provincial senior male athlete of the year is given the Ferd Memorial plaque in memory of Hayward.

In 1988, he carried the torch during the preparations for the Calgary Winter Olympics.

== See also ==
- List of people of Newfoundland and Labrador
