= Pongummart Ummarttayakul =

Thai sprinter (born 1934)

- Born: 14 April 1934 (age 92)
- Occupation: Police officer
- Years active: 1960s–1997

Pongummart Ummarttayakul (Thai: พงษ์อำมาตย์ อมาตยกุล; born 14 April 1934) is a Thai police general. He served as deputy commissioner-general of the Royal Thai Police and briefly as acting commissioner-general prior to his retirement in 1994. In his youth, he competed as a sprinter in the men's 400 metres at the 1952 Summer Olympics.
