= Helmuth Perz =

Austrian long-distance runner (1923–1998)

Personal information
- Nationality: Austrian
- Born: 6 September 1923 Hartberg, Austria
- Died: 28 January 1998 (aged 74) Graz, Austria

Sport
- Sport: Long-distance running
- Event: 5000 metres

Helmuth Perz (6 September 1923 – 28 January 1998) was an Austrian long-distance runner. He competed in the men's 5000 metres at the 1952 Summer Olympics. Perz died in Graz on 28 January 1998, at the age of 74.
