= George Genereux =

Canadian trap shooter and physician

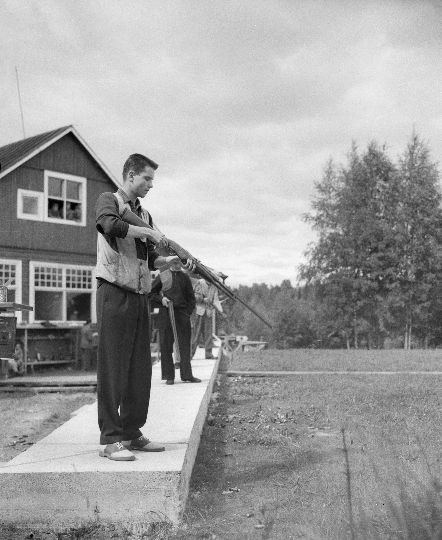
- Genereux in 1952

Personal information
- Full name: George Patrick Genereux
- Born: March 1, 1935 Saskatoon, Saskatchewan, Canada
- Died: April 10, 1989 (aged 54) Saskatoon, Saskatchewan, Canada
- Relative: Brendan Fraser (nephew)

Sport
- Event: Trap shooting
Medal record
Men's shooting
Representing Canada
Gold medal – first place	1952 Helsinki	Trap

George Patrick Genereux (March 1, 1935 – April 10, 1989) was a Canadian gold medal-winning trap shooter and physician.

Genereux was born in Saskatoon, Saskatchewan, the son of Catherine Mary (née Devine), a nurse who was originally from Mount Carmel, Pennsylvania, and Dr. Arthur George Genereux. He was the maternal uncle of Academy Award-winning actor Brendan Fraser. While still a student at Nutana Collegiate, he won the gold medal in the Olympic Trap at the 1952 Summer Olympics in Helsinki, Finland. He was, at the time, Canada's youngest Olympic champion, a record that stood until 2016.

In 1952, he was awarded the Lou Marsh Trophy. He was inducted into Canada's Sports Hall of Fame, the Saskatchewan Sports Hall of Fame, the Saskatoon Sports Hall of Fame, and, the Trapshooting Hall of Fame.

He received his Bachelor of Arts degree from the University of Saskatchewan and studied medicine at McGill University. He died in Saskatoon on April 10, 1989.
