= William Keith (athlete) =

South African long-distance runner

Personal information
- Nationality: South African
- Born: 26 November 1925 Petrus Steyn, South Africa
- Died: 5 September 1999 (aged 73) Bloemfontein, South Africa

Sport
- Sport: Long-distance running
- Event: Marathon

William Keith (26 November 1925 – 5 September 1999) was a South African long-distance runner. He competed in the marathon at the 1952 Summer Olympics.
