= Rupert Blöch =

Austrian sprinter

Personal information
- Nationality: Austrian
- Born: 15 June 1929
- Died: 28 July 2006 (aged 77)

Sport
- Sport: Sprinting
- Event: 400 metres

Rupert Blöch (15 June 1929 – 28 July 2006) was an Austrian sprinter. He competed in the men's 400 metres at the 1952 Summer Olympics.
