= Christopher Veitch =

South African rower

Personal information
- Nationality: South African
- Born: 13 January 1929 Australia
- Died: 18 July 2004 (aged 75) Johannesburg, South Africa

Sport
- Sport: Rowing

Christopher Veitch (13 January 1929 – 18 July 2004) is a South African rower. He competed in the men's coxless four event at the 1952 Summer Olympics.
