= Ollie Matson =

American football player and sprinter (1930–2011)

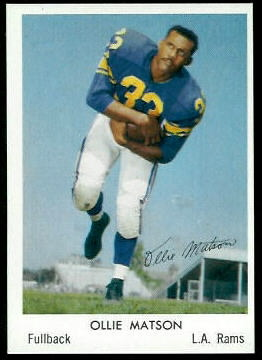
- Matson in 1959

No. 33, 30
- Positions: Halfback, return specialist

Personal information
- Born: May 1, 1930; Trinity, Texas, U.S.
- Died: February 19, 2011 (aged 80); Los Angeles, California, U.S.
- Listed height: 6 ft 2 in (1.88 m)
- Listed weight: 220 lb (100 kg)

Career information
- High school: George Washington (San Francisco, California)
- College: San Francisco (1949–1951)
- NFL draft: 1952: 1st round, 3rd overall pick

Career history
- Chicago Cardinals (1952–1958); Los Angeles Rams (1959–1962); Detroit Lions (1963); Philadelphia Eagles (1964–1966)

Awards and highlights
- 7× First-team All-Pro (1952, 1954–1959); 6× Pro Bowl (1952, 1954–1958); NFL punt return yards leader (1955); NFL 1950s All-Decade Team; Philadelphia Eagles Hall of Fame; Arizona Cardinals Ring of Honor; First-team All-American (1951); Pop Warner Trophy (1951); 3× First-team All-PCC (1949, 1950, 1951)

Career NFL statistics
- Rushing yards: 5,173
- Rushing average: 4.4
- Rushing touchdowns: 40
- Receptions: 222
- Receiving yards: 3,285
- Receiving touchdowns: 23
- Return yards: 4,341
- Return touchdowns: 9
- Stats at Pro Football Reference
- Pro Football Hall of Fame
- College Football Hall of Fame

Olympic medal record

Men's athletics

Representing the United States
Silver medal – second place	1952 Helsinki	4 × 400 metres relay
Bronze medal – third place	1952 Helsinki	400 metres

Ollie Genoa Matson II (May 1, 1930 – February 19, 2011) was an American Olympic medal winning sprinter and professional football player. He played as a halfback and return specialist in the National Football League (NFL) from 1952 to 1966 primarily for the Chicago Cardinals and the Los Angeles Rams. He played college football for the San Francisco Dons and was selected by the Cardinals in the first round (third overall) of the 1952 NFL draft.

Matson was named an NFL first team All-Pro seven times and selected to the Pro Bowl six times during the course of his professional career. He was elected to the Pro Football Hall of Fame in 1972, and later included in the NFL's 1950s all-decade team during the league's 100th anniversary celebration.

== Early life ==
Matson was born on May 1, 1930, in Trinity, Texas, near Houston. His parents separated when he was young, and his mother moved to California later, leaving him to be raised by his grandparents. He moved to San Francisco when he was 14 to rejoin his mother. Matson graduated from George Washington High School in San Francisco in 1948. In 1947, he set a San Francisco high school football scoring record with 102 points.

He was a two-sport athlete excelling in track and field as well as football. He won the City Championship in both the 100-yard and 220-yard dashes. In his senior year, he entered an open meet held at Kezar Stadium and ran the 440-yard dash competitively for the first time, chasing Jamaican sprinter Herb McKenley, the holder of the world record to a new record of 46.1 seconds. Matson finished second in 47 seconds. Races were held on cinder tracks in those times.

It was also reported at the time that Matson raced against McKenley at Edwards Field in Berkeley, California on June 5, 1948, where McKenley set a world record of 46 seconds in the 440. Matson ran competitively with McKenley, and gained ground on McKenley in the second half of the race, though McKenley ultimately won with yards to spare. Matson finished the race at 47.1 seconds, then a U.S. high school record.

== College career ==
Matson attended the City College of San Francisco (CCSF) prior to transferring to the University of San Francisco (USF). In his one football season at CCSF, he scored 19 touchdowns and led the team to a Northern California title. He was a first-team Junior College All-American.

As a sophomore at USF in 1949, Matson was considered among the top running backs in the country. He had touchdown runs of 92, 80, 61, 60, and 39 yards, among others, in just his first five games. During those five games, he had over 1,000 total yards from rushing, receiving, and returning punts and kickoffs. USF coach Joe Kuharich, who himself was a star player at Notre Dame and in the NFL said he had seen star professional players who could not do what Matson did on offense; and that in addition, Matson was also a "far greater defensive player".

As a junior in 1950, he had recurrent leg problems and suffered a knee injury. Even though injured, he still scored 81 points, and the Associated Press (AP) named him first team All-Pacific Coast as a defensive back. Matson played in a game in 1950 against the University of Tulsa, even after Tulsa had tried to get USF to leave its black players behind for the game. During the game, the Tulsa players hit him with their fists, knees and elbows, leaving him "'with two black eyes, a bloody nose, and [his] face puffed up like a pound cake". He scored three touchdowns in the game, however, every one of them was called back.

He was also a track star at USF. In 1949, he ran the 100-yard dash in 9.6 seconds, the 220-yard dash in 21.1 seconds, and the 440-yard dash in 47.1 seconds.

In 1951, Matson's senior year at USF, he led the nation in rushing yardage (1,566) and touchdowns (21) en route to leading the Dons to an undefeated season. He had kick returns for two touchdowns on runs of 94 (or 95) and 90 yards in a single game against Fordham. He averaged 51.5 minutes per game, starring on defense as well as offense, with five interceptions and many passes knocked down. He was selected as an AP All-American at defensive back, and finished ninth in Heisman Trophy balloting that year. He also was selected to the International News Service's (INS) All-America team. The INS also selected him to its All-Pacific Coast first team as a running back.

Despite its 9–0 record, the 1951 San Francisco team, which included future NFL Hall of Fame linemen Gino Marchetti and Bob St. Clair, was not invited to a bowl game. It was later reported that the Orange, Sugar and Gator Bowls—all hosted in the Deep South—did not consider inviting any teams that had black players, and USF refused to play without its two African-American members, Matson and Burl Toler. However, it has also been reported that the Dons were invited to play in the Orange Bowl if they did not bring Matson and future NFL game official Burl Toler, the only other black player on the team, to the game. The Dons players, led by Marchetti, unanimously refused to play if it required leaving their teammates behind, and did not participate in the Orange Bowl.

He played in the December 1951 East-West Shrine game, and in the 1952 Chicago College All-Star game against the Los Angeles Rams.

While at USF, Matson became a member of Kappa Alpha Psi fraternity.

== Olympic Games ==
Prior to joining the National Football League in 1952, Matson competed in track and field as part of the United States Olympic Team in the 1952 Summer Olympics at Helsinki, Finland. Matson won a bronze medal in the 400-meter run and a silver medal as part of the United States 4x400-meter relay team.

== NFL career ==
=== Chicago Cardinals ===
Ollie Matson was drafted in the first round of the 1952 NFL draft by the Chicago Cardinals, third pick overall. He went on to share 1952 Rookie of the Year honors with Hugh McElhenny of the San Francisco 49ers. Matson was named first-team All-Pro by the AP and second-team All-Pro by United Press International (UPI), and was selected to play in the Pro Bowl. He returned two kickoffs for touchdowns in his rookie year, including a 100-yard return, both leading the league; and was second in yards per kickoff return (31.2).

Matson missed the entire 1953 season while serving in the United States Army. During his year of service at Fort Ord, California, he was named the MVP of the All-Army football team, and the Fort Ord team defeated the Quantico Marines Devil Dogs in the December 1953 edition of the Poinsettia Bowl, an armed forces football championship game held several times in the early 1950s, with Matson scoring two touchdowns against the Marines.

Matson returned to the Cardinals in 1954, and averaged 5.0 yards per rushing attempt and 18 yards per reception, while starting in eight games. He had a total of 506 rushing yards and 611 receiving yards, with seven total touchdowns. He had an interception as a defensive back. He returned 11 punts including one for a touchdown, and 17 kickoffs including a 91-yard touchdown return. He was in the top ten players in yards per rushing attempt, yards per reception, and yards per kickoff return. He was selected to the Pro Bowl for a second time, and was named first-team All-Pro by the AP, UPI, Newspaper Enterprise Association (NEA) and The Sporting News.

In 1955, Matson led the league in punt return total yards (245), longest punt return (78 yards) and punt returns for touchdowns (2), to go along with 712 total yards rushing and receiving. He was selected to the Pro Bowl, and again was named first-team All-Pro by the AP, UPI, The Sporting News and the NEA. In 1956, he had a career high in rushing with 924 yards (4.8 yards per attempt), and a 105-yard kickoff return for a touchdown. He was again selected to Pro Bowl, and was again named first-team All-Pro by the AP, NEA and UPI and first-team All-Conference by The Sporting News.

After three poor years in 1952 (4–8), 1954 (2–10) and 1955 (4–7–1), the Cardinals finally had a winning record in 1956 (7–5). However, in 1957, the team fell back with a 3–9 record. During the 1957 season, Matson was used extensively as a wide receiver by Chicago Cardinals head coach Ray Richards. He had over 350 less rushing yards than the previous season; but over 250 more yards receiving and a nearly 10 yards per reception higher average. Matson's productivity at the position was questioned in the wake of the team's three win, nine loss finish, with some observers arguing that Matson's effectiveness as a running back was diminished by such use. New Cardinals head coach for 1958 Frank "Pop" Ivy took strong exception to such criticism of Matson lining up as a wide out, declaring:

"I have heard people say that the Cards stuck Matson out there on the flank as a 'decoy' on pass plays, and then forgot about him. That is absurd. He was sent out as flanker with the idea of throwing to him. But most opponents feared him so much that they doubled up on him. They watched him just as closely when he lines up as running back. They'd double team him if he were sitting up in the grandstand eating hot dogs, just to make sure."

Matson finished the 1957 season as the NFL's sixth most prolific running back, with 577 yards gained in 134 carries, for a 4.3 yard average, with six touchdowns. To this he added 20 catches for 451 yards and 3 touchdowns through the air. He was again selected to the Pro Bowl, and was again named first-team All-Pro by the AP, NEA and UPI and first-team All-Conference by The Sporting News. This would be his last year as a first-team All-Pro.

The Cardinals 1958 record was an even worse 2–9–1. Matson had his lowest rushing total as a full-time starter (505 yards), and while he caught a career-high 33 passes, his average reception yardage fell by 8.5 yards per reception. He was again selected to the Pro Bowl (for the last time), but did not make any of the AP All-Pro teams, and was named to the second team by the NEA and UPI.

=== Los Angeles Rams ===
Following the 1958 season, Matson was traded by the Cardinals to the Los Angeles Rams for eight players and a high 1960 draft choice. While Rams coach Sid Gillman originally wanted Matson when he became the Rams coach two years earlier, he thought the price paid in the trade was too much for a 29-year old Matson, but was overruled by the team's executives, including general manager and future NFL commissioner Pete Rozelle. In 1959, Matson had 863 rushing yards with six touchdowns in only nine starts, averaging a career best 5.4 yards per attempt, to go along with 130 receiving yards. The Rams still used him to return punts and kickoffs as well.

From 1960 forward, Matson's performance fell significantly. From 1960-62, he had less than 100 total rushing attempts for the Rams. He was valued as a defensive back in 1960, the first time he had played the position in eight years. In 1961, he did have 29 receptions for 537 yards (18.5 yards per reception) with three touchdowns, including a 96-yard touchdown.

=== Final years ===
The Rams traded Matson to the Detroit Lions for 32-year old veteran offensive lineman Harley Sewell, where he barely played in 1963. Matson's old USF coach, Joe Kuharich, now with the Philadelphia Eagles, brought Matson to Philadelphia in 1964. For the first time in five years, Matson was given an opportunity to start. He rushed for 100 yards and scored two touchdowns.

In 1964, Matson started in nine games total, rushing for 404 yards (4.2 yards per carry) with four touchdowns, and had 17 receptions for 242 yards and another touchdown. He was second in AP voting for Comeback Player of the Year. He retired after two more years in Philadelphia, primarily in a reserve role.

When Matson retired in 1966, his 12,799 career all-purpose yards were second only to Jim Brown, and he was eighth all-time in career rushing yards.

== Honors ==
Matson was inducted to the Pro Football Hall of Fame in 1972. Joe Kuharich gave his enshrinement speech. He was inducted into the College Football Hall of Fame in 1976. Matson was inducted into the University of San Francisco Athletics Hall of Fame in 1959.

== NFL career statistics ==
=== Rushing/receiving stats ===
Year	Team	Games		Rushing						Receiving					Fumbles	
Year	Team	GP	GS	Att	Yds	Avg	Y/G	Lng	TD	Rec	Yds	Avg	Lng	TD	Fum	FR
1952	CRD	12	7	96	344	3.6	28.7	25	3	11	187	17.0	47	3	8	4
1953	CRD	Missed season due to Army service														
1954	CRD	12	8	101	506	5.0	42.2	79	4	34	611	18.0	70	3	7	3
1955	CRD	12	12	109	475	4.4	39.6	54	1	17	237	13.9	70	2	7	3
1956	CRD	12	12	192	924	4.8	77.0	79	5	15	199	13.3	45	2	6	0
1957	CRD	12	11	134	577	4.3	48.1	56	6	20	451	22.6	75	3	6	1
1958	CRD	12	12	129	505	3.9	42.1	55	5	33	465	14.1	59	3	10	3
1959	RAM	12	9	161	863	5.4	71.9	50	6	18	130	7.2	49	0	9	0
1960	RAM	12	7	61	170	2.8	14.2	27	1	15	98	6.5	24	0	3	0
1961	RAM	14	13	24	181	7.5	12.9	69	2	29	537	18.5	96	3	–	–
1962	RAM	13	4	3	0	0.0	0.0	0	0	3	49	16.3	20	1	–	–
1963	DET	8	0	13	20	1.5	2.5	9	0	2	20	10.0	17	0	–	–
1964	PHI	12	9	96	404	4.2	33.7	63	4	17	242	14.2	32	1	7	1
1965	PHI	14	1	22	103	4.7	7.4	22	2	2	29	14.5	20	1	–	–
1966	PHI	14	2	29	101	3.5	7.2	28	1	6	30	5.0	11	1	3	0
Career		171	107	1,170	5,173	4.4	30.3	79	40	222	3,285	14.8	96	23	66	15

=== Returning stats ===
Year	Team	GP	PRet	Yards	Y/R	Lng	TD	KRet	Yards	Y/R	Lng	TD
1952	CRD	12	9	86	9.6	23	0	20	624	31.2	100	2
1953	CRD	Missed season due to Army service										
1954	CRD	12	11	100	9.1	59	1	17	449	26.4	91	1
1955	CRD	12	13	245	18.8	78	2	15	368	24.5	37	0
1956	CRD	12	5	39	7.8	16	0	13	362	27.8	105	1
1957	CRD	12	10	54	5.4	28	0	7	154	22.0	32	0
1958	CRD	12	–	–	–	–	–	14	497	35.5	101	2
1959	RAM	12	14	61	4.4	20	0	16	367	22.9	48	0
1960	RAM	12	1	0	0.0	0.0	0	9	216	24.0	42	0
1961	RAM	Did not record any stats										
1962	RAM	Did not record any stats										
1963	DET	8	–	–	–	–	–	3	61	20.3	30	0
1964	PHI	12	2	10	5.0	9	0	3	104	34.7	43	0
1965	PHI	Did not record any stats										
1966	PHI	14	–	–	–	–	–	26	544	20.9	31	0
Career		171	65	595	9.2	78	3	143	3,746	26.2	105	6

== Personal life ==
Matson married his wife Mary, whom he met when both were San Francisco teenagers in the mid-1940s, in 1952. He and Mary lived in the same Los Angeles home from the time he played for the Los Angeles Rams until his death. His son, Ollie III (known as Ollie Jr.), was a college basketball player.

In his later years Matson had dementia (he had been mostly bedridden for several years), which was linked to Chronic traumatic encephalopathy (CTE), a progressive degenerative disease, diagnosed post-mortem in individuals with a history of multiple concussions and other forms of head injury. According to his son, due to his degenerative brain disease Matson would wash the family's four cars almost daily and barbecue chicken at 6:30 am during his later years.

According to his nephew, Matson had not spoken in the four years prior to his passing.

== Death ==
On February 19, 2011, Ollie Matson died of dementia complications (respiratory failure) surrounded by family at his home in Los Angeles, California. He is one of at least 345 NFL players to be diagnosed after death with chronic traumatic encephalopathy (CTE), which is caused by repeated hits to the head. The researchers who diagnosed him after death found his stage 4 CTE one of the most severe cases they had seen.

== See also ==
- List of college football yearly rushing leaders
- List of NCAA major college football yearly scoring leaders
- List of Pro Football Hall of Fame inductees
- List of NFL players with chronic traumatic encephalopathy

== Bibliography ==
- John Eisenberg, That First Season:: How Vince Lombardi Took the Worst Team in the NFL and Set It on the Path to Glory. New York: Houghton Mifflin Harcourt Publishing Co., 2009.
