= Harald Fereberger =

Austrian sailor (1929–2019)

Personal information
- Nationality: Austrian
- Born: 30 May 1929 Gmunden, Austria
- Died: 15 July 2019 (aged 90)

Sport
- Sport: Sailing

Harald Fereberger (30 May 1929 – 15 July 2019) was an Austrian sailor. He competed at the 1952 Summer Olympics, the 1960 Summer Olympics and the 1972 Summer Olympics.
