= Mate Trojanović =

Yugoslavian rower (1930–2015)

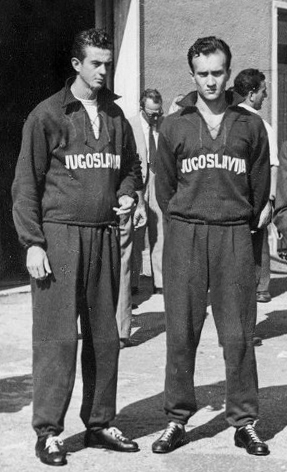
- Trojanović (right) at the 1952 Olympics

Personal information
- Born: 20 May 1930 Metković, Littoral Banovina, Kingdom of Yugoslavia
- Died: 27 March 2015 (aged 84) Maribor, Slovenia

Sport
- Sport: Rowing
- Club: HVK Gusar, Split
Medal record
Representing Yugoslavia
Olympic Games
Gold medal – first place	1952 Helsinki	Coxless four

Mate Trojanović (20 May 1930 – 27 March 2015) was a Yugoslavian rower of Croat ethnicity, who won a gold medal in the coxless four event at the 1952 Summer Olympics. After completing his studies in veterinary medicine in Split he moved to Maribor, where he worked as a veterinary inspector with the Yugoslav federal customs.
