= Don Dyke-Wells =

South African rower (1925–2023)

Donald Newson Dyke-Wells (13 February 1925 – 20 March 2023) was a South African rower who competed at the 1952 Summer Olympics in the coxless four event. He died on 20 March 2023, at the age of 98.
