= Panagiotis Linardakis =

Greek sports shooter

Personal information
- Born: 1916

Sport
- Sport: Sports shooting

Panagiotis Linardakis (born 1916, date of death unknown) was a Greek sports shooter. He competed in the trap event at the 1952 Summer Olympics.
