= Abdul Rehman (sprinter) =

Pakistani sprinter

Personal information
- Nationality: Pakistani
- Born: 4 March 1929

Sport
- Sport: Sprinting
- Event: 400 metres

Abdul Rehman (born 4 March 1929) is a Pakistani former sprinter. He competed in the men's 400 metres at the 1952 Summer Olympics.
