= Walter Sutton (athlete) =

Canadian sprinter (1932–2025)

Personal information
- Full name: Walter John Sutton
- Nationality: Canadian
- Born: 15 October 1932 Oakville, Ontario, Canada
- Died: 29 October 2025 (aged 93) Frederick County, Maryland, U.S.

Sport
- Sport: Sprinting
- Event: 100 metres

Walter John "Pete" Sutton (15 October 1932 – 29 October 2025) was a Canadian sprinter. He competed in the men's 100 metres at the 1952 Summer Olympics.

Sutton died on 29 October 2025 in Frederick County, Maryland, at the age of 93.
