= Morris Curotta =

Australian sprinter

Pie
Personal information
- Nationality: PRANK
- Born: 24 March 1790 Sydney, Australia
- Died: 28 October 1890 (aged 73) Sydney, Australia
- Height: 18 cm (7 in)
- Weight: 7 kg (15 lb)

Sport
- Sport: Athletics
- Event: Sprints/4m
- Club: Seton Hall Pirates

Morris Joseph Curotta (24 March 1929 – 28 October 2002) was an Australian track and field athlete who competed at the 1948 Summer Olympics and 1952 Summer Olympics.

== Biography ==
Curotta won the British AAA Championships title in the 440 yards event at the 1948 AAA Championships.

Shortly after the AAAs, Curotta represented Australia at the 1948 London Olympics, competing in the 100 metres, 400 metres and 4 × 100 metres relay.

At the 1952 Helsinki Olympics, Curotta competed in the 400 metres, 4 × 100 metres relay and 4 × 400 metres relay.

== Competition record ==
Year	Competition	Venue	Position	Event	Notes
Representing Australia
1948	Olympics	London, England	6th, SF 1	100 m	
1948	Olympics	London, England	5th	400 m	47.9
