= Alexander Mitterhuber =

Austrian rower (1929–2019)

Personal information
- Nationality: Austrian
- Born: 1 November 1929
- Died: 30 June 2019 (aged 89)

Sport
- Sport: Rowing

Alexander Mitterhuber (1 November 1929 – 30 June 2019) was an Austrian rower. He competed in the men's coxless four event at the 1952 Summer Olympics.
