= Johann Geiszler =

Austrian rower

Personal information
- Nationality: Austrian
- Born: 29 June 1926

Sport
- Sport: Rowing

Johann Geiszler (born 29 June 1926) was an Austrian rower. He competed in the men's coxless four event at the 1952 Summer Olympics.
