= Roy Cole (sport shooter) =

Canadian sports shooter

Personal information
- Born: 8 April 1912 Hamilton, Ontario, Canada
- Died: 22 November 1999 (aged 87) Hamilton, Ontario, Canada

Sport
- Sport: Sports shooting

Roy Cole (8 April 1912 – 22 November 1999) was a Canadian sports shooter. He competed in the trap event at the 1952 Summer Olympics.
