= Bill Chivell =

South African sprinter

Personal information
- Full name: William Henry Chivell
- Nationality: South African
- Born: 21 October 1932 Bredasdorp, South Africa
- Died: 11 September 1996 (aged 63)

Sport
- Sport: Sprinting
- Event: 4 × 400 metres relay

William Henry Chivell (21 October 1932 – 11 September 1996) was a South African sprinter. He competed in the men's 4 × 400 metres relay at the 1952 Summer Olympics.
