= Lloyd Montour =

Canadian rower

Personal information
- Nationality: Canadian
- Born: 18 December 1925
- Died: 22 January 2005 (aged 79); Duncan, British Columbia, Canada

Sport
- Sport: Rowing

Lloyd Montour (18 December 1925 – 22 January 2005) was a Canadian rower. He competed in the men's coxless four event at the 1952 Summer Olympics.
