= Albert Lowagie =

Belgian sprinter

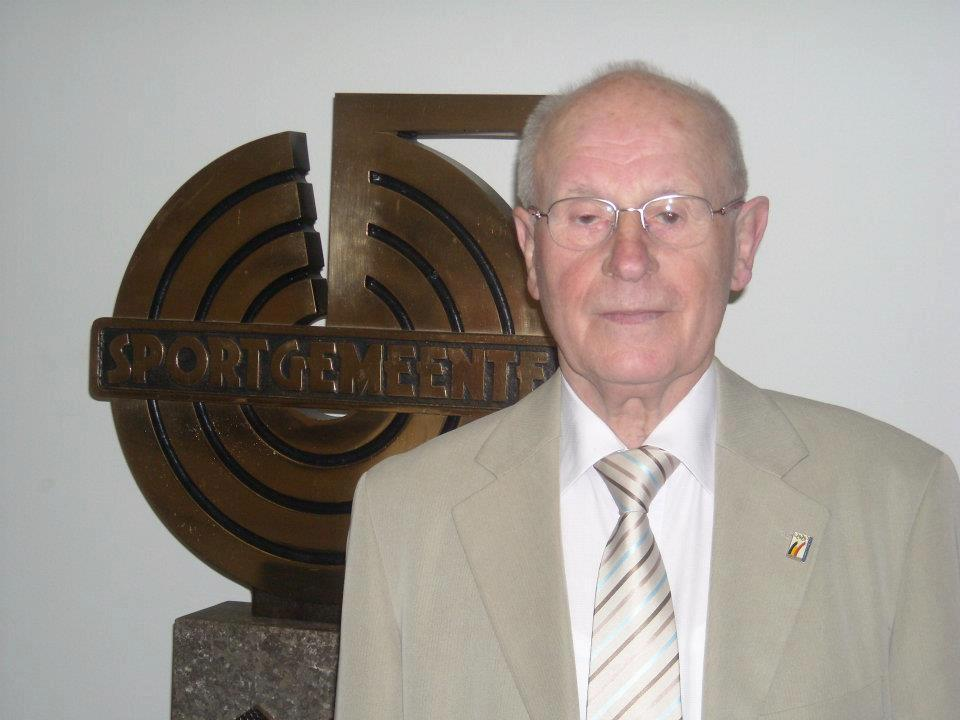

Personal information
- Nationality: Belgian
- Born: 22 September 1929 Ypres, Belgium
- Died: 17 March 2026 (aged 96)

Sport
- Sport: Sprinting
- Event: 400 metres

Albert Lowagie (22 September 1929 – 17 March 2026) was a Belgian sprinter. He competed in the men's 400 metres at the 1952 Summer Olympics. He died on 17 March 2026, age 96.
