= Hans Ernst Schneider (athlete) =

Swiss sprinter

Personal information
- Nationality: Swiss
- Born: 4 February 1927
- Died: 14 October 2014 (aged 87)

Sport
- Sport: Sprinting
- Event: 400 metres

Hans Ernst Schneider (4 February 1927 – 14 October 2014) was a Swiss sprinter. He competed in the men's 400 metres at the 1952 Summer Olympics.
