= Imre Kaffka =

Hungarian rower (1931–2019)

Personal information
- Born: 5 December 1931 Budapest, Kingdom of Hungary
- Died: 17 December 2019 (aged 88) Budapest, Hungary

Sport
- Sport: Rowing
Medal record
Men's rowing
Representing Hungary
European Championships
Bronze medal – third place	1956 Bled	Eight

Imre Kaffka (5 December 1931 – 17 December 2019) was a Hungarian rower. He competed at the 1952 Summer Olympics in Helsinki with the men's coxless four where they were eliminated in the round one repêchage.
