= Josef Steger (athlete) =

Swiss sprinter

Personal information
- Nationality: Swiss
- Born: 24 March 1925
- Died: 22 August 2015 (aged 90)

Sport
- Sport: Sprinting
- Event: 400 metres

Josef Steger (24 March 1925 – 22 August 2015) was a Swiss sprinter. He competed in the men's 400 metres at the 1952 Summer Olympics.
