= Khristo Shopov =

Bulgarian sports shooter

Personal information
- Born: 12 January 1912

Sport
- Sport: Sports shooting

Khristo Shopov (born 12 January 1912, date of death unknown) was a Bulgarian sports shooter. He competed in the trap event at the 1952 Summer Olympics.
