= Edmunds Pīlāgs =

Latvian sprinter

Personal information
- Nationality: Latvian
- Born: 7 June 1927 Riga, Latvia
- Died: 21 May 1995 (aged 67) Riga, Latvia

Sport
- Sport: Sprinting
- Event: 400 metres

Edmunds Pīlāgs (7 June 1927 – 21 May 1995) was a Latvian sprinter. He competed in the men's 400 metres at the 1952 Summer Olympics representing the Soviet Union.
