= Aurang Zeb =

Pakistani sprinter

Personal information
- Nationality: Pakistani
- Born: 10 January 1923

Sport
- Sport: Sprinting
- Event: 400 metres

Aurang Zeb (born 10 January 1923) is a Pakistani sprinter. He competed in the men's 400 metres at the 1952 Summer Olympics.
