= John Webb (rower) =

South African rower

Personal information
- Nationality: South African
- Born: 25 March 1930
- Died: 25 December 2006 (aged 76); Sunningdale, England

Sport
- Sport: Rowing

John Webb (25 March 1930 – 25 December 2006) is a South African rower. He competed in the men's coxless four event at the 1952 Summer Olympics.
