= Velimir Valenta =

Yugoslav-Croatian rower (1929–2004)

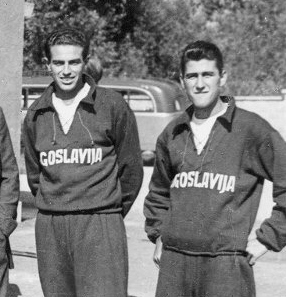
- Valenta (left) at the 1952 Olympics

Personal information
- Born: 21 April 1929 Klis, Kingdom of SCS
- Died: 27 November 2004 (aged 75) Mendrisio, Switzerland

Sport
- Sport: Rowing
- Club: HVK Gusar, Split
Medal record
Representing Yugoslavia
Olympic Games
Gold medal – first place	1952 Helsinki	Coxless four

Velimir Valenta (21 April 1929 – 27 November 2004) was a Yugoslav/Croatian rower who won a gold medal in the coxless four event at the 1952 Summer Olympics.
