= Paul Kerb =

Austrian fencer

Personal information
- Born: 20 December 1929 Vienna, Austria
- Died: 5 November 2017 (aged 87)

Sport
- Sport: Fencing

Paul Kerb (20 December 1929 – 5 November 2017) was an Austrian fencer from Vienna. He competed in the team sabre events at the 1952 and 1960 Summer Olympics.
