= Damian Nichol =

South African rower (1930–2015)

Personal information
- Nationality: South African
- Born: 25 December 1930; Kroonstad, South Africa
- Died: July 2015 (aged 84); Knysna, South Africa

Sport
- Sport: Rowing

Damian Allen Nichol (25 December 1930 – July 2015) was a South African rower. He competed in the men's coxless four event at the 1952 Summer Olympics. Nichol died in Knysna in July 2015, at the age of 84.
