= Antonio Vega (sport shooter) =

Spanish sports shooter

Personal information
- Born: 18 September 1932 San Sebastián, Spain
- Died: 15 August 2011 (aged 78)

Sport
- Sport: Sports shooting

Antonio Vega (18 September 1932 – 15 August 2011) was a Spanish sports shooter. He competed in the trap event at the 1952 Summer Olympics.
