= Frances O'Halloran =

Canadian sprinter

Personal information
- Born: 25 January 1934 (age 91) Toronto, Ontario, Canada

Sport
- Sport: Sprinting
- Event: 200 metres

Frances O'Halloran (born 25 January 1934) is a Canadian sprinter. She competed in the women's 200 metres at the 1952 Summer Olympics.
