= Petar Šegvić =

Croatian rower

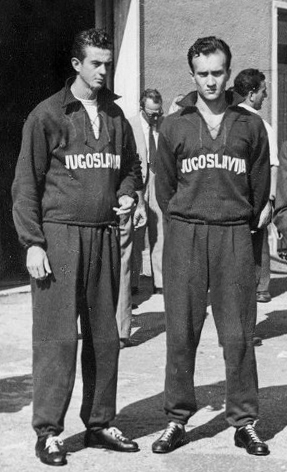
- Šegvić (left) at the 1952 Olympics

Personal information
- Born: 25 June 1930 Split, Littoral Banovina, Kingdom of Yugoslavia
- Died: 7 June 1990 (aged 59) Split, SR Croatia, SFR Yugoslavia

Sport
- Sport: Rowing
- Club: HVK Gusar, Split
Medal record
Representing Yugoslavia
Olympic Games
Gold medal – first place	1952 Helsinki	Coxless four

Petar Šegvić (25 June 1930 – 7 June 1990) was a Croatian rower who won a gold medal in the coxless four event at the 1952 Summer Olympics.
