= Kurt Marz =

Austrian rower (1924–2015)

Personal information
- Nationality: Austrian
- Born: 1 October 1924 Vienna, Austria
- Died: 1 October 2015 (aged 91) Wels, Austria

Sport
- Sport: Rowing

Kurt Marz (1 October 1924 – 1 October 2015) was an Austrian rower. He competed in the men's coxless four event at the 1952 Summer Olympics. Marz died in Wels on 1 October 2015, his 91st birthday.
