= Luella Law =

Canadian sprinter (born 1934)

Personal information
- Nationality: Canadian
- Born: 17 March 1934 (age 91) Vancouver, British Columbia, Canada

Sport
- Sport: Sprinting
- Event: 100 metres

Luella May Law (born 17 March 1934) is a Canadian sprinter. She competed in the women's 100 metres at the 1952 Summer Olympics. Law was eliminated in the heats of the 1954 British Empire and Commonwealth Games 80 metres hurdles.
