= Adolf Scheithauer =

Austrian rower

Personal information
- Nationality: Austrian
- Born: 24 July 1926
- Died: 1990 (aged 63–64)

Sport
- Sport: Rowing

Adolf Scheithauer (24 July 1926 – 1990) was an Austrian rower. He competed in the men's coxless four event at the 1952 Summer Olympics.
