= Duje Bonačić =

Croatian rower (1929–2020)

- Bonačić at the 1952 Olympics

Personal information
- Born: 10 April 1929 Split, Littoral Banovina, Kingdom of Yugoslavia
- Died: 24 January 2020 (aged 90) Split, Croatia

Sport
- Sport: Rowing
- Club: HVK Gusar, Split
Medal record
Men's rowing
Representing Yugoslavia
Olympic Games
Gold medal – first place	1952 Helsinki	Coxless four

Duje Bonačić (10 April 1929 – 24 January 2020) was a Croatian rower who won a gold medal representing Yugoslavia in the coxless four event at the 1952 Summer Olympics.

Bonačić was born in Split to an ethnic Croat father and ethnic Slovene mother. He had an elder brother Vojko and a sister Nevenka. He graduated in natural sciences in Zagreb, and took up rowing to build muscles, as he weighed only 56 kg with a height of 183 cm at the time. After retiring from competitions he worked as a professor of geography, meteorology and oceanography at maritime schools and also served as a coach and referee in rowing and sailing.

After the death of Željko Čajkovski on 11 November 2016, he became the oldest Croatian Olympic medal winner. Bonačić died on 24 January 2020, at the age of 90 following a short illness.
