= Neville Price =

South African long jumper (1929–1980)

Neville Graham Price (1 June 1929 in East London – 28 December 1980) was a South African long jumper who competed in the 1952 Summer Olympics and in the 1956 Summer Olympics.

In 1953, Price held a personal best of 24 ft 11 1/2 in (7.6 m). He was an All-American for the Oklahoma Sooners track and field team, placing 4th in the long jump at the 1952 NCAA track and field championships. He improved that to 7.87 m (25 ft 9 3/4 in) in 1955. He was a three-time Big 12 Conference champion in the long jump and a winner of the Drake Relays.
