= Ferenc Bánhalmi =

Hungarian sprinter (1923–1983)

Ferenc Bánhalmi (19 June 1923 – 2 February 1983) was a Hungarian sprinter who competed in the 1948 Summer Olympics and in the 1952 Summer Olympics. He was born and died in Budapest.
