= Louis van Biljon =

South African sprinter

Personal information
- Nationality: South African
- Born: 31 July 1927 Cala, South Africa
- Died: 3 September 1995 (aged 68)

Sport
- Sport: Sprinting
- Event: 400 metres

Louis van Biljon (31 July 1927 – 3 September 1995) was a South African sprinter. He competed in the men's 400 metres at the 1952 Summer Olympics.
