= Jack Carroll (sprinter) =

Canadian sprinter

Personal information
- Born: 31 July 1930 Montreal, Quebec, Canada
- Died: 1 April 1997 (aged 66) Lunenburg, Nova Scotia, Canada

Sport
- Sport: Sprinting
- Event: 400 metres

John Fralic Carroll (31 July 1930 – 1 April 1997) was a Canadian sprinter. He competed in the men's 400 metres at the 1952 Summer Olympics.

Carroll ran for the Michigan Wolverines track and field team.
