= Ernst von Gunten =

Swiss sprinter

Ernst von Gunten (28 July 1921 – 8 November 2010) was a Swiss sprinter, who competed in the 1952 Summer Olympics. He died in November 2010 at the age of 89.
