= Schalk Booysen =

South African sprinter

Personal information
- Nationality: South African
- Born: 22 August 1927 Pretoria, South Africa
- Died: 1 May 2011 (aged 83)

Sport
- Sport: Sprinting
- Event: 200 metres

Schalk David Booysen (22 August 1927 – 1 May 2011) was a South African sprinter. He competed in the men's 200 metres at the 1952 Summer Olympics where he was also the flag bearer for South Africa in the opening ceremony. He finished seventh in the 1950 British Empire Games 880 yards. In the 1950 British Empire Games 440 yards he was eliminated in the heats.
