= John Anderton (athlete) =

South African sprinter

Personal information
- Nationality: South African
- Born: 28 December 1929 Cape Town, South Africa
- Died: 24 May 1991 (aged 61)

Sport
- Sport: Sprinting
- Event: 400 metres

John Bowden Anderton (28 December 1929 – 24 May 1991) was a South African sprinter. He competed in the men's 400 metres at the 1952 Summer Olympics.
