= Junkichi Matoba =

Japanese sprinter

Personal information
- Nationality: Japanese
- Born: 15 January 1931

Sport
- Sport: Sprinting
- Event: 400 metres

Junkichi Matoba (的場 淳吉, Matoba Junkichi; born 15 January 1931) is a Japanese former sprinter. He competed in the men's 400 metres at the 1952 Summer Olympics.
