= Gianni Rocca =

Italian sprinter (1929–2013)

Personal information
- Full name: Giovanni Rocca
- Nationality: Italian
- Born: 13 June 1929 Milan, Italy
- Died: 11 August 2013 (aged 84)

Sport
- Country: Italy
- Sport: Athletics
- Event: 400 metres

Achievements and titles
- Personal best: 400 m: 48.4 (1952)

Gianni Rocca (13 June 1929 – 11 August 2013) was an Italian sprinter (400 m) and the Italian flag bearer at the 1948 Summer Olympics.

== Biography ==
Rocca was born in Milan. He participated, with the Italy national relay team, in the 4 × 400 metres at two editions of the Summer Olympics (1948 and 1952).

== See also ==
- List of flag bearers for Italy at the Olympics

Summer Olympics
Preceded by Giulio Gaudini	Flag bearer for Italy; 1948 London	Succeeded by Miranda Cicognani
