= Ioannis Koutsis (sport shooter) =

Greek sports shooter

Personal information
- Born: 1908

Sport
- Sport: Sports shooting

Ioannis Koutsis (born 1908, date of death unknown) was a Greek sports shooter. He competed at the 1952 Summer Olympics and the 1956 Summer Olympics.
