= George Portelance =

Canadian swimmer (1931–1952)

Personal information
- Born: 2 February 1931
- Died: 14 September 1952 (aged 21) Powell River, British Columbia, Canada

Sport
- Sport: Swimming

George Portelance (2 February 1931 – 14 September 1952) was a Canadian breaststroke and freestyle swimmer. He competed in two events at the 1952 Summer Olympics. He died by drowning in a boating accident.
