= Antoine Uyterhoeven =

Belgian sprinter (1930–2001)

Personal information
- Nationality: Belgian
- Born: 12 April 1930 Veltem-Beisem, Belgium
- Died: 18 March 2001 (aged 70) Leuven, Belgium

Sport
- Sport: Sprinting
- Event: 400 metres

Antoine Uyterhoeven (12 April 1930 – 18 March 2001) was a Belgian sprinter. He competed in the men's 400 metres at the 1952 Summer Olympics. Uyterhoeven died on 18 March 2001, at the age of 70.
