= James Lavery =

Canadian sprinter (1929–2024)

Personal information
- Born: 3 March 1929 Calgary, Alberta, Canada
- Died: 25 September 2024 (aged 95)

Sport
- Sport: Sprinting
- Event: 400 metres

James A. Lavery (3 March 1929 – 25 September 2024) was a Canadian sprinter. He competed in the men's 400 metres at the 1952 Summer Olympics. Lavery died on 25 September 2024, at the age of 95.
