= List of European Athletics Championships medalists (men) =

This is the complete list of men's medalists of the European Athletics Championships.

== Track ==
=== 100 metres ===
Games	Gold	Silver	Bronze
1934 Turin	Chris Berger (NED)	Erich Borchmeyer (GER)	József Sir (HUN)
1938 Paris	Tinus Osendarp (NED)	Orazio Mariani (ITA)	Lennart Strandberg (SWE)
1946 Oslo	Jack Archer (GBR)	Haakon Tranberg (NOR)	Carlo Monti (ITA)
1950 Brussels	Étienne Bally (FRA)	Franco Leccese (ITA)	Vladimir Sukharev (URS)
1954 Bern	Heinz Fütterer (FRG)	René Bonino (FRA)	George Ellis (GBR)
1958 Stockholm	Armin Hary (FRG)	Manfred Germar (FRG)	Peter Radford (GBR)
1962 Belgrade	Claude Piquemal (FRA)	Jocelyn Delecour (FRA)	Peter Gamper (FRG)
1966 Budapest	Wiesław Maniak (POL)	Roger Bambuck (FRA)	Claude Piquemal (FRA)
1969 Athens	Valeriy Borzov (URS)	Alain Sarteur (FRA)	Philippe Clerc (SUI)
1971 Helsinki	Valeriy Borzov (URS)	Gerhard Wucherer (FRG)	Vasilis Papageorgopoulos (GRE)
1974 Rome	Valeriy Borzov (URS)	Pietro Mennea (ITA)	Klaus-Dieter Bieler (FRG)
1978 Prague	Pietro Mennea (ITA)	Eugen Ray (GDR)	Vladimir Ignatenko (URS)
1982 Athens	Frank Emmelmann (GDR)	Pierfrancesco Pavoni (ITA)	Marian Woronin (POL)
1986 Stuttgart	Linford Christie (GBR)	Steffen Bringmann (GDR)	Bruno Marie-Rose (FRA)
1990 Split	Linford Christie (GBR)	Daniel Sangouma (FRA)	John Regis (GBR)
1994 Helsinki	Linford Christie (GBR)	Geir Moen (NOR)	Aleksandr Porkhomovskiy (RUS)
1998 Budapest	Darren Campbell (GBR)	Dwain Chambers (GBR)	Haralabos Papadias (GRE)
2002 Munich	Francis Obikwelu (POR)	Darren Campbell (GBR)	Roland Németh (HUN)
2006 Gothenburg	Francis Obikwelu (POR)	Andrey Yepishin (RUS)	Matic Osovnikar (SLO)
2010 Barcelona	Christophe Lemaitre (FRA)	Mark Lewis-Francis (GBR)	Martial Mbandjock (FRA)
2012 Helsinki	Christophe Lemaitre (FRA)	Jimmy Vicaut (FRA)	Jaysuma Saidy Ndure (NOR)
2014 Zürich	James Dasaolu (GBR)	Christophe Lemaitre (FRA)	Harry Aikines-Aryeetey (GBR)
2016 Amsterdam	Churandy Martina (NED)	Jak Ali Harvey (TUR)	Jimmy Vicaut (FRA)
2018 Berlin	Zharnel Hughes (GBR)	Reece Prescod (GBR)	Jak Ali Harvey (TUR)
2022 Munich	Marcell Jacobs (ITA)	Zharnel Hughes (GBR)	Jeremiah Azu (GBR)
2024 Rome	Marcell Jacobs (ITA)	Chituru Ali (ITA)	Romell Glave (GBR)
2026 Birmingham	Romell Glave (GBR)	Jeremiah Azu (GBR)	Owen Ansah (GER)

=== 200 metres ===
Games	Gold	Silver	Bronze
1934 Turin	Chris Berger (NED)	József Sir (HUN)	Tinus Osendarp (NED)
1938 Paris	Tinus Osendarp (NED)	Jakob Scheuring (GER)	Alan Pennington (GBR)
1946 Oslo	Nikolay Karakulov (URS)	Haakon Tranberg (NOR)	Jiří David (TCH)
1950 Brussels	Brian Shenton (GBR)	Étienne Bally (FRA)	Jan Lammers (NED)
1954 Bern	Heinz Fütterer (FRG)	Ardalion Ignatyev (URS)	George Ellis (GBR)
1958 Stockholm	Manfred Germar (FRG)	David Segal (GBR)	Jocelyn Delecour (FRA)
1962 Belgrade	Owe Jonsson (SWE)	Marian Foik (POL)	Sergio Ottolina (ITA)
1966 Budapest	Roger Bambuck (FRA)	Marian Dudziak (POL)	Jean-Claude Nallet (FRA)
1969 Athens	Philippe Clerc (SUI)	Herman Burde (GDR)	Zenon Nowosz (POL)
1971 Helsinki	Valeriy Borzov (URS)	Franz-Peter Hofmeister (FRG)	Jörg Pfeifer (GDR)
1974 Rome	Pietro Mennea (ITA)	Manfred Ommer (FRG)	Hans-Jürgen Bombach (GDR)
1978 Prague	Pietro Mennea (ITA)	Olaf Prenzler (GDR)	Peter Muster (SUI)
1982 Athens	Olaf Prenzler (GDR)	Cameron Sharp (GBR)	Frank Emmelmann (GDR)
1986 Stuttgart	Vladimir Krylov (URS)	Jürgen Evers (FRG)	Andrey Fedoriv (URS)
1990 Split	John Regis (GBR)	Jean-Charles Trouabal (FRA)	Linford Christie (GBR)
1994 Helsinki	Geir Moen (NOR)	Vladyslav Dolohodin (UKR)	Patrick Stevens (BEL)
1998 Budapest	Douglas Walker (GBR)	Douglas Turner (GBR)	Julian Golding (GBR)
2002 Munich	Konstantinos Kenteris (GRE)	Francis Obikwelu (POR)	Marlon Devonish (GBR)
2006 Gothenburg	Francis Obikwelu (POR)	Johan Wissman (SWE)	Marlon Devonish (GBR)
2010 Barcelona	Christophe Lemaitre (FRA)	Christian Malcolm (GBR)	Martial Mbandjock (FRA)
2012 Helsinki	Churandy Martina (NED)	Patrick van Luijk (NED)	Danny Talbot (GBR)
2014 Zürich	Adam Gemili (GBR)	Christophe Lemaitre (FRA)	Serhiy Smelyk (UKR)
2016 Amsterdam	Bruno Hortelano (ESP)	Ramil Guliyev (TUR)	Danny Talbot (GBR)
2018 Berlin	Ramil Guliyev (TUR)	Nethaneel Mitchell-Blake (GBR)	Alex Wilson (SUI)
2022 Munich	Zharnel Hughes (GBR)	Nethaneel Mitchell-Blake (GBR)	Filippo Tortu (ITA)
2024 Rome	Timothé Mumenthaler (SUI)	Filippo Tortu (ITA)	William Reais (SUI)
2026 Birmingham	Owen Ansah (GER)	Zharnel Hughes (GBR)	Eseosa Fostine Desalu (ITA) Timothé Mumenthaler (SUI)

=== 400 metres ===
Games	Gold	Silver	Bronze
1934 Turin	Adolf Metzner (GER)	Pierre Skawinski (FRA)	Bertil von Wachenfeldt (SWE)
1938 Paris	Godfrey Brown (GBR)	Karl Baumgarten (NED)	Erich Linnhoff (GER)
1946 Oslo	Niels Holst-Sørensen (DEN)	Jacques Lunis (FRA)	Derek Pugh (GBR)
1950 Brussels	Derek Pugh (GBR)	Jacques Lunis (FRA)	Lars-Erik Wolfbrandt (SWE)
1954 Bern	Ardalion Ignatyev (URS)	Voitto Hellsten (FIN)	Zoltán Adamik (HUN)
1958 Stockholm	John Wrighton (GBR)	John Salisbury (GBR)	Karl-Friedrich Haas (FRG)
1962 Belgrade	Robbie Brightwell (GBR)	Manfred Kinder (FRG)	Hans-Joachim Reske (FRG)
1966 Budapest	Stanisław Grędziński (POL)	Andrzej Badeński (POL)	Manfred Kinder (FRG)
1969 Athens	Jan Werner (POL)	Jean-Claude Nallet (FRA)	Stanisław Grędziński (POL)
1971 Helsinki	David Jenkins (GBR)	Marcello Fiasconaro (ITA)	Jan Werner (POL)
1974 Rome	Karl Honz (FRG)	David Jenkins (GBR)	Bernd Herrmann (FRG)
1978 Prague	Franz-Peter Hofmeister (FRG)	Karel Kolář (TCH)	Francis Demarthon (FRA)
1982 Athens	Hartmut Weber (FRG)	Andreas Knebel (GDR)	Viktor Markin (URS)
1986 Stuttgart	Roger Black (GBR)	Thomas Schönlebe (GDR)	Mathias Schersing (GDR)
1990 Split	Roger Black (GBR)	Thomas Schönlebe (GDR)	Jens Carlowitz (GDR)
1994 Helsinki	Du'aine Ladejo (GBR)	Roger Black (GBR)	Mathias Rusterholz (SUI)
1998 Budapest	Iwan Thomas (GBR)	Robert Maćkowiak (POL)	Mark Richardson (GBR)
2002 Munich	Ingo Schultz (GER)	David Canal (ESP)	Daniel Caines (GBR)
2006 Gothenburg	Marc Raquil (FRA)	Vladislav Frolov (RUS)	Leslie Djhone (FRA)
2010 Barcelona	Kevin Borlée (BEL)	Michael Bingham (GBR)	Martyn Rooney (GBR)
2012 Helsinki	Pavel Maslák (CZE)	Marcell Deák-Nagy (HUN)	Yannick Fonsat (FRA)
2014 Zürich	Martyn Rooney (GBR)	Matthew Hudson-Smith (GBR)	Donald Sanford (ISR)
2016 Amsterdam	Martyn Rooney (GBR)	Pavel Maslák (CZE)	Liemarvin Bonevacia (NED)
2018 Berlin	Matthew Hudson-Smith (GBR)	Kevin Borlée (BEL)	Jonathan Borlée (BEL)
2022 Munich	Matthew Hudson-Smith (GBR)	Ricky Petrucciani (SUI)	Alex Haydock-Wilson (GBR)
2024 Rome	Alexander Doom (BEL)	Charlie Dobson (GBR)	Liemarvin Bonevacia (NED)
2026 Birmingham	Matthew Hudson-Smith (GBR)	Muhammad Abdallah Kounta (FRA)	Jonas Phijffers (NED)

=== 800 metres ===
Games	Gold	Silver	Bronze
1934 Turin	Miklós Szabó (HUN)	Mario Lanzi (ITA)	Wolfgang Dessecker (GER)
1938 Paris	Rudolf Harbig (GER)	Jacques Lévèque (FRA)	Mario Lanzi (ITA)
1946 Oslo	Rune Gustafsson (SWE)	Niels Holst-Sørensen (DEN)	Marcel Hansenne (FRA)
1950 Brussels	John Parlett (GBR)	Marcel Hansenne (FRA)	Roger Bannister (GBR)
1954 Bern	Lajos Szentgáli (HUN)	Lucien De Muynck (BEL)	Audun Boysen (NOR)
1958 Stockholm	Mike Rawson (GBR)	Audun Boysen (NOR)	Paul Schmidt (FRG)
1962 Belgrade	Manfred Matuschewski (GDR)	Valery Bulyshev (URS)	Paul Schmidt (FRG)
1966 Budapest	Manfred Matuschewski (GDR)	Franz-Josef Kemper (FRG)	Bodo Tümmler (FRG)
1969 Athens	Dieter Fromm (GDR)	Jozef Plachý (TCH)	Manfred Matuschewski (GDR)
1971 Helsinki	Yevhen Arzhanov (URS)	Dieter Fromm (GDR)	Andy Carter (GBR)
1974 Rome	Luciano Sušanj (YUG)	Steve Ovett (GBR)	Markku Taskinen (FIN)
1978 Prague	Olaf Beyer (GDR)	Steve Ovett (GBR)	Sebastian Coe (GBR)
1982 Athens	Hans-Peter Ferner (FRG)	Sebastian Coe (GBR)	Jorma Härkönen (FIN)
1986 Stuttgart	Sebastian Coe (GBR)	Tom McKean (GBR)	Steve Cram (GBR)
1990 Split	Tom McKean (GBR)	David Sharpe (GBR)	Piotr Piekarski (POL)
1994 Helsinki	Andrea Benvenuti (ITA)	Vebjørn Rodal (NOR)	Tomás de Teresa (ESP)
1998 Budapest	Nils Schumann (GER)	André Bucher (SUI)	Lukáš Vydra (CZE)
2002 Munich	Wilson Kipketer (DEN)	André Bucher (SUI)	Nils Schumann (GER)
2006 Gothenburg	Bram Som (NED)	David Fiegen (LUX)	Sam Ellis (GBR)
2010 Barcelona	Marcin Lewandowski (POL)	Michael Rimmer (GBR)	Adam Kszczot (POL)
2012 Helsinki	Yuriy Borzakovskiy (RUS)	Andreas Bube (DEN)	Pierre-Ambroise Bosse (FRA)
2014 Zürich	Adam Kszczot (POL)	Artur Kuciapski (POL)	Mark English (IRL)
2016 Amsterdam	Adam Kszczot (POL)	Marcin Lewandowski (POL)	Elliot Giles (GBR)
2018 Berlin	Adam Kszczot (POL)	Andreas Kramer (SWE)	Pierre-Ambroise Bosse (FRA)
2022 Munich	Mariano García (ESP)	Jake Wightman (GBR)	Mark English (IRL)
2024 Rome	Gabriel Tual (FRA)	Mohamed Attaoui (ESP)	Catalin Tecuceanu (ITA)
2026 Birmingham	Mark English (IRL)	Marino Bloudek (CRO)	Mohamed Attaoui (ESP)

=== 1500 metres ===
Games	Gold	Silver	Bronze
1934 Turin	Luigi Beccali (ITA)	Miklós Szabó (HUN)	Roger Normand (FRA)
1938 Paris	Sydney Wooderson (GBR)	Joseph Mostert (BEL)	Luigi Beccali (ITA)
1946 Oslo	Lennart Strand (SWE)	Henry Eriksson (SWE)	Erik Jørgensen (DEN)
1950 Brussels	Willem Slijkhuis (NED)	Patrick El Mabrouk (FRA)	Bill Nankeville (GBR)
1954 Bern	Roger Bannister (GBR)	Gunnar Nielsen (DEN)	Stanislav Jungwirth (TCH)
1958 Stockholm	Brian Hewson (GBR)	Dan Waern (SWE)	Ron Delany (IRL)
1962 Belgrade	Michel Jazy (FRA)	Witold Baran (POL)	Tomáš Salinger (TCH)
1966 Budapest	Bodo Tümmler (FRG)	Michel Jazy (FRA)	Harald Norpoth (FRG)
1969 Athens	John Whetton (GBR)	Frank Murphy (IRL)	Henryk Szordykowski (POL)
1971 Helsinki	Franco Arese (ITA)	Henryk Szordykowski (POL)	Brendan Foster (GBR)
1974 Rome	Klaus-Peter Justus (GDR)	Tom Hansen (DEN)	Thomas Wessinghage (FRG)
1978 Prague	Steve Ovett (GBR)	Eamonn Coghlan (IRL)	David Moorcroft (GBR)
1982 Athens	Steve Cram (GBR)	Nikolay Kirov (URS)	José Manuel Abascal (ESP)
1986 Stuttgart	Steve Cram (GBR)	Sebastian Coe (GBR)	Han Kulker (NED)
1990 Split	Jens-Peter Herold (GDR)	Gennaro Di Napoli (ITA)	Mário Silva (POR)
1994 Helsinki	Fermín Cacho (ESP)	Isaac Viciosa (ESP)	Branko Zorko (CRO)
1998 Budapest	Reyes Estévez (ESP)	Rui Silva (POR)	Fermín Cacho (ESP)
2002 Munich	Mehdi Baala (FRA)	Reyes Estévez (ESP)	Rui Silva (POR)
2006 Gothenburg	Mehdi Baala (FRA)	Ivan Heshko (UKR)	Juan Carlos Higuero (ESP)
2010 Barcelona	Arturo Casado (ESP)	Carsten Schlangen (GER)	Manuel Olmedo (ESP)
2012 Helsinki	Henrik Ingebrigtsen (NOR)	Florian Carvalho (FRA)	David Bustos (ESP)
2014 Zürich	Mahiedine Mekhissi-Benabbad (FRA)	Henrik Ingebrigtsen (NOR)	Chris O'Hare (GBR)
2016 Amsterdam	Filip Ingebrigtsen (NOR)	David Bustos (ESP)	Henrik Ingebrigtsen (NOR)
2018 Berlin	Jakob Ingebrigtsen (NOR)	Marcin Lewandowski (POL)	Jake Wightman (GBR)
2022 Munich	Jakob Ingebrigtsen (NOR)	Jake Heyward (GBR)	Mario García (ESP)
2024 Rome	Jakob Ingebrigtsen (NOR)	Jochem Vermeulen (BEL)	Pietro Arese (ITA)
2026 Birmingham	Stefan Nillessen (NED)	Samuel Pihlström (SWE)	Andrew Coscoran (IRL)

=== 5000 metres ===
Games	Gold	Silver	Bronze
1934 Turin	Roger Rochard (FRA)	Janusz Kusociński (POL)	Ilmari Salminen (FIN)
1938 Paris	Taisto Mäki (FIN)	Henry Jonsson (SWE)	Kauko Pekuri (FIN)
1946 Oslo	Sydney Wooderson (GBR)	Willem Slijkhuis (NED)	Evert Nyberg (SWE)
1950 Brussels	Emil Zátopek (TCH)	Alain Mimoun (FRA)	Gaston Reiff (BEL)
1954 Bern	Vladimir Kuts (URS)	Christopher Chataway (GBR)	Emil Zátopek (TCH)
1958 Stockholm	Zdzisław Krzyszkowiak (POL)	Kazimierz Zimny (POL)	Gordon Pirie (GBR)
1962 Belgrade	Bruce Tulloh (GBR)	Kazimierz Zimny (POL)	Pyotr Bolotnikov (URS)
1966 Budapest	Michel Jazy (FRA)	Harald Norpoth (FRG)	Bernd Dießner (GDR)
1969 Athens	Ian Stewart (GBR)	Rashid Sharafetdinov (URS)	Alan Blinston (GBR)
1971 Helsinki	Juha Väätäinen (FIN)	Jean Wadoux (FRA)	Harald Norpoth (FRG)
1974 Rome	Brendan Foster (GBR)	Manfred Kuschmann (GDR)	Lasse Virén (FIN)
1978 Prague	Venanzio Ortis (ITA)	Aleksandr Fedotkin (URS) Markus Ryffel (SUI)	Not awarded
1982 Athens	Thomas Wessinghage (FRG)	Werner Schildhauer (GDR)	David Moorcroft (GBR)
1986 Stuttgart	Jack Buckner (GBR)	Stefano Mei (ITA)	Tim Hutchings (GBR)
1990 Split	Salvatore Antibo (ITA)	Gary Staines (GBR)	Sławomir Majusiak (POL)
1994 Helsinki	Dieter Baumann (GER)	Robert Denmark (GBR)	Abel Antón (ESP)
1998 Budapest	Isaac Viciosa (ESP)	Manuel Pancorbo (ESP)	Mark Carroll (IRL)
2002 Munich	Alberto García (ESP)	Ismaïl Sghyr (FRA)	Serhiy Lebid (UKR)
2006 Gothenburg	Jesús España (ESP)	Mo Farah (GBR)	Juan Carlos Higuero (ESP)
2010 Barcelona	Mo Farah (GBR)	Jesús España (ESP)	Hayle Ibrahimov (AZE)
2012 Helsinki	Mo Farah (GBR)	Arne Gabius (GER)	Polat Kemboi Arıkan (TUR)
2014 Zürich	Mo Farah (GBR)	Hayle Ibrahimov (AZE)	Andy Vernon (GBR)
2016 Amsterdam	Ilias Fifa (ESP)	Adel Mechaal (ESP)	Richard Ringer (GER)
2018 Berlin	Jakob Ingebrigtsen (NOR)	Henrik Ingebrigtsen (NOR)	Morhad Amdouni (FRA)
2022 Munich	Jakob Ingebrigtsen (NOR)	Mohamed Katir (ESP)	Yemaneberhan Crippa (ITA)
2024 Rome	Jakob Ingebrigtsen (NOR)	George Mills (GBR)	Dominic Lokinyomo Lobalu (SUI)
2026 Birmingham	Jakob Ingebrigtsen (NOR)	Florian Bremm (GER)	Etienne Daguinos (FRA)

=== 10,000 metres ===
Games	Gold	Silver	Bronze
1934 Turin	Ilmari Salminen (FIN)	Arvo Askola (FIN)	Henry Nielsen (DEN)
1938 Paris	Ilmari Salminen (FIN)	Giuseppe Beviacqua (ITA)	Max Syring (GER)
1946 Oslo	Viljo Heino (FIN)	Helge Perälä (FIN)	András Csaplár (HUN)
1950 Brussels	Emil Zátopek (TCH)	Alain Mimoun (FRA)	Väinö Koskela (FIN)
1954 Bern	Emil Zátopek (TCH)	József Kovács (HUN)	Frank Sando (GBR)
1958 Stockholm	Zdzisław Krzyszkowiak (POL)	Yevgeny Zhukov (URS)	Nikolay Pudov (URS)
1962 Belgrade	Pyotr Bolotnikov (URS)	Friedrich Janke (GDR)	Roy Fowler (GBR)
1966 Budapest	Jürgen Haase (GDR)	Lajos Mecser (HUN)	Leonid Mykytenko (URS)
1969 Athens	Jürgen Haase (GDR)	Mike Tagg (GBR)	Nikolay Sviridov (URS)
1971 Helsinki	Juha Väätäinen (FIN)	Jürgen Haase (GDR)	Rashid Sharafetdinov (URS)
1974 Rome	Manfred Kuschmann (GDR)	Tony Simmons (GBR)	Giuseppe Cindolo (ITA)
1978 Prague	Martti Vainio (FIN)	Venanzio Ortis (ITA)	Aleksandras Antipovas (URS)
1982 Athens	Alberto Cova (ITA)	Werner Schildhauer (GDR)	Martti Vainio (FIN)
1986 Stuttgart	Stefano Mei (ITA)	Alberto Cova (ITA)	Salvatore Antibo (ITA)
1990 Split	Salvatore Antibo (ITA)	Are Nakkim (NOR)	Stefano Mei (ITA)
1994 Helsinki	Abel Antón (ESP)	Vincent Rousseau (BEL)	Stéphane Franke (GER)
1998 Budapest	António Pinto (POR)	Dieter Baumann (GER)	Stéphane Franke (GER)
2002 Munich	José Manuel Martínez (ESP)	Dieter Baumann (GER)	José Ríos (ESP)
2006 Gothenburg	Jan Fitschen (GER)	José Manuel Martínez (ESP)	Juan Carlos de la Ossa (ESP)
2010 Barcelona	Mo Farah (GBR)	Chris Thompson (GBR)	Daniele Meucci (ITA)
2012 Helsinki	Polat Kemboi Arıkan (TUR)	Daniele Meucci (ITA)	Yevgeny Rybakov (RUS)
2014 Zürich	Mo Farah (GBR)	Andy Vernon (GBR)	Ali Kaya (TUR)
2016 Amsterdam	Polat Kemboi Arıkan (TUR)	Ali Kaya (TUR)	Antonio Abadía (ESP)
2018 Berlin	Morhad Amdouni (FRA)	Bashir Abdi (BEL)	Yemaneberhan Crippa (ITA)
2022 Munich	Yemaneberhan Crippa (ITA)	Zerei Kbrom Mezngi (NOR)	Yann Schrub (FRA)
2024 Rome	Dominic Lokinyomo Lobalu (SUI)	Yann Schrub (FRA)	Thierry Ndikumwenayo (ESP)
2026 Birmingham	Andreas Almgren (SWE)	Dominic Lokinyomo Lobalu (SUI)	Jimmy Gressier (FRA)

=== Half marathon ===
Games	Gold	Silver	Bronze
2016 Amsterdam	Tadesse Abraham (SUI)	Kaan Kigen Özbilen (TUR)	Daniele Meucci (ITA)
2024 Rome	Yemaneberhan Crippa (ITA)	Pietro Riva (ITA)	Amanal Petros (GER)

=== Marathon ===
Games	Gold	Silver	Bronze
1934 Turin	Armas Toivonen (FIN)	Thore Enochsson (SWE)	Aurelio Genghini (ITA)
1938 Paris	Väinö Muinonen (FIN)	Squire Yarrow (GBR)	Henry Palmé (SWE)
1946 Oslo	Mikko Hietanen (FIN)	Väinö Muinonen (FIN)	Yakov Punko (URS)
1950 Brussels	Jack Holden (GBR)	Veikko Karvonen (FIN)	Feodosy Vanin (URS)
1954 Bern	Veikko Karvonen (FIN)	Boris Grishayev (URS)	Ivan Filin (URS)
1958 Stockholm	Sergei Popov (URS)	Ivan Filin (URS)	Frederick Norris (GBR)
1962 Belgrade	Brian Kilby (GBR)	Aurèle Vandendriessche (BEL)	Viktor Baykov (URS)
1966 Budapest	Jim Hogan (GBR)	Aurèle Vandendriessche (BEL)	Gyula Tóth (HUN)
1969 Athens	Ron Hill (GBR)	Gaston Roelants (BEL)	Jim Alder (GBR)
1971 Helsinki	Karel Lismont (BEL)	Trevor Wright (GBR)	Ron Hill (GBR)
1974 Rome	Ian Thompson (GBR)	Eckhard Lesse (GDR)	Gaston Roelants (BEL)
1978 Prague	Leonid Moseyev (URS)	Nikolay Penzin (URS)	Karel Lismont (BEL)
1982 Athens	Gerard Nijboer (NED)	Armand Parmentier (BEL)	Karel Lismont (BEL)
1986 Stuttgart	Gelindo Bordin (ITA)	Orlando Pizzolato (ITA)	Herbert Steffny (FRG)
1990 Split	Gelindo Bordin (ITA)	Gianni Poli (ITA)	Dominique Chauvelier (FRA)
1994 Helsinki	Martín Fiz (ESP)	Diego García (ESP)	Alberto Juzdado (ESP)
1998 Budapest	Stefano Baldini (ITA)	Danilo Goffi (ITA)	Vincenzo Modica (ITA)
2002 Munich	Janne Holmén (FIN)	Pavel Loskutov (EST)	Julio Rey (ESP)
2006 Gothenburg	Stefano Baldini (ITA)	Viktor Röthlin (SUI)	Julio Rey (ESP)
2010 Barcelona	Viktor Röthlin (SUI)	José Manuel Martínez (ESP)	Dmitry Safronov (RUS)
2012 Helsinki	Not included in the program		
2014 Zürich	Daniele Meucci (ITA)	Yared Shegumo (POL)	Aleksey Reunkov (RUS)
2016 Amsterdam	Replaced by half marathon		
2018 Berlin	Koen Naert (BEL)	Tadesse Abraham (SUI)	Yassine Rachik (ITA)
2022 Munich	Richard Ringer (GER)	Maru Teferi (ISR)	Gashau Ayale (ISR)
2024 Rome	Replaced by half marathon		
2026 Birmingham	Amanal Petros (GER)	Pietro Riva (ITA)	Gashau Ayale (ISR)

=== 110 metres hurdles ===
Games	Gold	Silver	Bronze
1934 Turin	József Kovács (HUN)	Erwin Wegner (GER)	Holger Albrechtsen (NOR)
1938 Paris	Don Finlay (GBR)	Håkan Lidman (SWE)	Reindert Brasser (NED)
1946 Oslo	Håkan Lidman (SWE)	Pol Braekman (BEL)	Väinö Suvivuo (FIN)
1950 Brussels	André-Jacques Marie (FRA)	Ragnar Lundberg (SWE)	Peter Hildreth (GBR)
1954 Bern	Yevhen Bulanchyk (URS)	Jack Parker (GBR)	Bert Steines (FRG)
1958 Stockholm	Martin Lauer (FRG)	Stanko Lorger (YUG)	Anatoly Mikhaylov (URS)
1962 Belgrade	Anatoly Mikhaylov (URS)	Giovanni Cornacchia (ITA)	Mykola Berezutskiy (URS)
1966 Budapest	Eddy Ottoz (ITA)	Hinrich John (FRG)	Marcel Duriez (FRA)
1969 Athens	Eddy Ottoz (ITA)	David Hemery (GBR)	Alan Pascoe (GBR)
1971 Helsinki	Frank Siebeck (GDR)	Alan Pascoe (GBR)	Lubomír Nádeníček (TCH)
1974 Rome	Guy Drut (FRA)	Mirosław Wodzyński (POL)	Leszek Wodzyński (POL)
1978 Prague	Thomas Munkelt (GDR)	Jan Pusty (POL)	Arto Bryggare (FIN)
1982 Athens	Thomas Munkelt (GDR)	Andrey Prokofyev (URS)	Arto Bryggare (FIN)
1986 Stuttgart	Stéphane Caristan (FRA)	Arto Bryggare (FIN)	Carlos Sala (ESP)
1990 Split	Colin Jackson (GBR)	Tony Jarrett (GBR)	Dietmar Koszewski (FRG)
1994 Helsinki	Colin Jackson (GBR)	Florian Schwarthoff (GER)	Tony Jarrett (GBR)
1998 Budapest	Colin Jackson (GBR)	Falk Balzer (GER)	Robin Korving (NED)
2002 Munich	Colin Jackson (GBR)	Staņislavs Olijars (LAT)	Artur Kohutek (POL)
2006 Gothenburg	Staņislavs Olijars (LAT)	Thomas Blaschek (GER)	Andy Turner (GBR)
2010 Barcelona	Andy Turner (GBR)	Garfield Darien (FRA)	Dániel Kiss (HUN)
2012 Helsinki	Sergey Shubenkov (RUS)	Garfield Darien (FRA)	Artur Noga (POL)
2014 Zürich	Sergey Shubenkov (RUS)	William Sharman (GBR)	Pascal Martinot-Lagarde (FRA)
2016 Amsterdam	Dimitri Bascou (FRA)	Balázs Baji (HUN)	Wilhem Belocian (FRA)
2018 Berlin	Pascal Martinot-Lagarde (FRA)	Sergey Shubenkov (ANA)	Orlando Ortega (ESP)
2022 Munich	Asier Martínez (ESP)	Pascal Martinot-Lagarde (FRA)	Just Kwaou-Mathey (FRA)
2024 Rome	Lorenzo Simonelli (ITA)	Enrique Llopis (ESP)	Jason Joseph (SUI)
2026 Birmingham	Jason Joseph (SUI)	Just Kwaou-Mathey (FRA)	Jakub Szymański (POL)

=== 400 metres hurdles ===
Games	Gold	Silver	Bronze
1934 Turin	Hans Scheele (GER)	Akilles Järvinen (FIN)	Christos Mantikas (GRE)
1938 Paris	Prudent Joye (FRA)	József Kovács (HUN)	Kell Areskoug (SWE)
1946 Oslo	Bertel Storskrubb (FIN)	Sixten Larsson (SWE)	Rune Larsson (SWE)
1950 Brussels	Armando Filiput (ITA)	Yuriy Lituyev (URS)	Harry Whittle (GBR)
1954 Bern	Anatoliy Yulin (URS)	Yuriy Lituyev (URS)	Ossi Mildh (FIN)
1958 Stockholm	Yuriy Lituyev (URS)	Per-Owe Trollsås (SWE)	Bruno Galliker (SUI)
1962 Belgrade	Salvatore Morale (ITA)	Jörg Neumann (FRG)	Helmut Janz (FRG)
1966 Budapest	Roberto Frinolli (ITA)	Gerd Loßdörfer (FRG)	Robert Poirier (FRA)
1969 Athens	Vyacheslav Skomorokhov (URS)	John Sherwood (GBR)	Andy Todd (GBR)
1971 Helsinki	Jean-Claude Nallet (FRA)	Christian Rudolph (GDR)	Dmitry Stukalov (URS)
1974 Rome	Alan Pascoe (GBR)	Jean-Claude Nallet (FRA)	Yevgeniy Gavrilenko (URS)
1978 Prague	Harald Schmid (FRG)	Dmitry Stukalov (URS)	Vasyl Arkhypenko (URS)
1982 Athens	Harald Schmid (FRG)	Aleksandr Yatsevich (URS)	Uwe Ackermann (GDR)
1986 Stuttgart	Harald Schmid (FRG)	Aleksandr Vasilyev (URS)	Sven Nylander (SWE)
1990 Split	Kriss Akabusi (GBR)	Sven Nylander (SWE)	Niklas Wallenlind (SWE)
1994 Helsinki	Oleh Tverdokhlib (UKR)	Sven Nylander (SWE)	Stéphane Diagana (FRA)
1998 Budapest	Paweł Januszewski (POL)	Ruslan Mashchenko (RUS)	Fabrizio Mori (ITA)
2002 Munich	Stéphane Diagana (FRA)	Jiří Mužík (CZE)	Paweł Januszewski (POL)
2006 Gothenburg	Periklis Iakovakis (GRE)	Marek Plawgo (POL)	Rhys Williams (GBR)
2010 Barcelona	Dai Greene (GBR)	Rhys Williams (GBR)	Stanislav Melnykov (UKR)
2012 Helsinki	Rhys Williams (GBR)	Emir Bekrić (SRB)	Stanislav Melnykov (UKR)
2014 Zürich	Kariem Hussein (SUI)	Rasmus Mägi (EST)	Denis Kudryavtsev (RUS)
2016 Amsterdam	Yasmani Copello (TUR)	Sergio Fernández (ESP)	Kariem Hussein (SUI)
2018 Berlin	Karsten Warholm (NOR)	Yasmani Copello (TUR)	Thomas Barr (IRL)
2022 Munich	Karsten Warholm (NOR)	Wilfried Happio (FRA)	Yasmani Copello (TUR)
2024 Rome	Karsten Warholm (NOR)	Alessandro Sibilio (ITA)	Carl Bengtström (SWE)
2026 Birmingham	Karsten Warholm (NOR)	Emil Agyekum (GER)	İsmail Nezir (TUR)

=== 3000 metres steeplechase ===
Games	Gold	Silver	Bronze
1938 Paris	Lars Larsson (SWE)	Ludwig Kaindl (GER)	Alf Lindblad (FIN)
1946 Oslo	Raphaël Pujazon (FRA)	Erik Elmsäter (SWE)	Tore Sjöstrand (SWE)
1950 Brussels	Jindřich Roudný (TCH)	Petar Šegedin (YUG)	Erik Blomster (FIN)
1954 Bern	Sándor Rozsnyói (HUN)	Olavi Rinteenpää (FIN)	Ernst Larsen (NOR)
1958 Stockholm	Jerzy Chromik (POL)	Semyon Rzhishchin (URS)	Hans Hüneke (FRG)
1962 Belgrade	Gaston Roelants (BEL)	Zoltan Vamoș (ROU)	Nikolay Sokolov (URS)
1966 Budapest	Viktor Kudynskyi (URS)	Anatoliy Kuryan (URS)	Gaston Roelants (BEL)
1969 Athens	Mikhail Zhelev (BUL)	Aleksandr Morozov (URS)	Vladimir Dudin (URS)
1971 Helsinki	Jean-Paul Villain (FRA)	Dušan Moravčík (TCH)	Pavel Sysoev (URS)
1974 Rome	Bronisław Malinowski (POL)	Anders Gärderud (SWE)	Michael Karst (FRG)
1978 Prague	Bronisław Malinowski (POL)	Patriz Ilg (FRG)	Ismo Toukonen (FIN)
1982 Athens	Patriz Ilg (FRG)	Bronisław Malinowski (POL)	Domingo Ramón (ESP)
1986 Stuttgart	Hagen Melzer (GDR)	Francesco Panetta (ITA)	Patriz Ilg (FRG)
1990 Split	Francesco Panetta (ITA)	Mark Rowland (GBR)	Alessandro Lambruschini (ITA)
1994 Helsinki	Alessandro Lambruschini (ITA)	Angelo Carosi (ITA)	William Van Dijck (BEL)
1998 Budapest	Damian Kallabis (GER)	Alessandro Lambruschini (ITA)	Jim Svenøy (NOR)
2002 Munich	Antonio David Jiménez (ESP)	Simon Vroemen (NED)	Luis Miguel Martín (ESP)
2006 Gothenburg	Jukka Keskisalo (FIN)	José Luis Blanco (ESP)	Bouabdellah Tahri (FRA)
2010 Barcelona	Mahiedine Mekhissi-Benabbad (FRA)	Bouabdellah Tahri (FRA)	Ion Luchianov (MDA)
2012 Helsinki	Mahiedine Mekhissi-Benabbad (FRA)	Tarık Langat Akdağ (TUR)	Víctor García (ESP)
2014 Zürich	Yoann Kowal (FRA)	Krystian Zalewski (POL)	Ángel Mullera (ESP)
2016 Amsterdam	Mahiedine Mekhissi-Benabbad (FRA)	Aras Kaya (TUR)	Yoann Kowal (FRA)
2018 Berlin	Mahiedine Mekhissi-Benabbad (FRA)	Fernando Carro (ESP)	Yohanes Chiappinelli (ITA)
2022 Munich	Topi Raitanen (FIN)	Ahmed Abdelwahed (ITA)	Osama Zoghlami (ITA)
2024 Rome	Alexis Miellet (FRA)	Djilali Bedrani (FRA)	Karl Bebendorf (GER)
2026 Birmingham	Frederik Ruppert (GER)	Ruben Querinjean (LUX)	Karl Bebendorf (GER)

=== 10,000 metres track walk (discontinued event) ===
Games	Gold	Silver	Bronze
1946 Oslo	John Mikaelsson (SWE)	Fritz Schwab (SUI)	Émile Maggi (FRA)
1950 Brussels	Fritz Schwab (SUI)	Émile Maggi (FRA)	John Mikaelsson (SWE)
1954 Bern	Josef Doležal (TCH)	Anatoliy Yegorov (URS)	Sergey Lobastov (URS)

=== 20 kilometres walk ===
Games	Gold	Silver	Bronze
1958 Stockholm	Stan Vickers (GBR)	Leonid Spirin (URS)	Lennart Back (SWE)
1962 Belgrade	Ken Matthews (GBR)	Hans-Georg Reimann (GDR)	Volodymyr Holubnychy (URS)
1966 Budapest	Dieter Lindner (GDR)	Volodymyr Holubnychy (URS)	Nikolay Smaga (URS)
1969 Athens	Paul Nihill (GBR)	Leonida Caraiosifoglu (ROU)	Nikolay Smaga (URS)
1971 Helsinki	Nikolay Smaga (URS)	Gerhard Sperling (GDR)	Paul Nihill (GBR)
1974 Rome	Volodymyr Holubnychy (URS)	Bernd Kannenberg (FRG)	Roger Mills (GBR)
1978 Prague	Roland Wieser (GDR)	Pyotr Pochynchuk (URS)	Anatoliy Solomin (URS)
1982 Athens	José Marín (ESP)	Jozef Pribilinec (TCH)	Pavol Blažek (TCH)
1986 Stuttgart	Jozef Pribilinec (TCH)	Maurizio Damilano (ITA)	Miguel Ángel Prieto (ESP)
1990 Split	Pavol Blažek (TCH)	Daniel Plaza (ESP)	Thierry Toutain (FRA)
1994 Helsinki	Mikhail Shchennikov (RUS)	Yevgeniy Misyulya (BLR)	Valentí Massana (ESP)
1998 Budapest	Ilya Markov (RUS)	Aigars Fadejevs (LAT)	Paquillo Fernández (ESP)
2002 Munich	Paquillo Fernández (ESP)	Vladimir Andreyev (RUS)	Juan Manuel Molina (ESP)
2006 Gothenburg	Paquillo Fernández (ESP)	Valeriy Borchin (RUS)	João Vieira (POR)
2010 Barcelona	Alex Schwazer (ITA)	João Vieira (POR)	Robert Heffernan (IRL)
2012 Helsinki	Not included in the program		
2014 Zürich	Miguel Ángel López (ESP)	Denis Strelkov (RUS)	Ruslan Dmytrenko (UKR)
2016 Amsterdam	Not included in the program		
2018 Berlin	Álvaro Martín (ESP)	Diego García (ESP)	Vasiliy Mizinov (ANA)
2022 Munich	Álvaro Martín (ESP)	Perseus Karlström (SWE)	Diego García (ESP)
2024 Rome	Perseus Karlström (SWE)	Paul McGrath (ESP)	Francesco Fortunato (ITA)

=== 35 kilometres walk ===
Games	Gold	Silver	Bronze
2022 Munich	Miguel Ángel López (ESP)	Christopher Linke (GER)	Matteo Giupponi (ITA)
2024 Rome	Not included in the program		

=== 50 kilometres walk (discontinued event) ===
Games	Gold	Silver	Bronze
1934 Turin	Jānis Daliņš (LAT)	Arthur Tell Schwab (SUI)	Ettore Rivolta (ITA)
1938 Paris	Harold Whitlock (GBR)	Herbert Dill (GER)	Edgar Bruun (NOR)
1946 Oslo	John Ljunggren (SWE)	Harry Forbes (GBR)	Charles Megnin (GBR)
1950 Brussels	Pino Dordoni (ITA)	John Ljunggren (SWE)	Verner Ljunggren (SWE)
1954 Bern	Vladimir Ukhov (URS)	Josef Doležal (TCH)	Antal Róka (HUN)
1958 Stockholm	Yevgeny Maskinskov (URS)	Abdon Pamich (ITA)	Max Weber (GDR)
1962 Belgrade	Abdon Pamich (ITA)	Grigoriy Panichkin (URS)	Don Thompson (GBR)
1966 Budapest	Abdon Pamich (ITA)	Gennadiy Agapov (URS)	Oleksandr Shcherbyna (URS)
1969 Athens	Christoph Höhne (GDR)	Peter Selzer (GDR)	Veniamin Soldatenko (URS)
1971 Helsinki	Veniamin Soldatenko (URS)	Christoph Höhne (GDR)	Peter Selzer (GDR)
1974 Rome	Christoph Höhne (GDR)	Otto Barch (URS)	Peter Selzer (GDR)
1978 Prague	Jorge Llopart (ESP)	Veniamin Soldatenko (URS)	Jan Ornoch (POL)
1982 Athens	Reima Salonen (FIN)	José Marín (ESP)	Bo Gustafsson (SWE)
1986 Stuttgart	Hartwig Gauder (GDR)	Vyacheslav Ivanenko (URS)	Valeriy Suntsov (URS)
1990 Split	Andrey Perlov (URS)	Bernd Gummelt (GDR)	Hartwig Gauder (GDR)
1994 Helsinki	Valeriy Spitsyn (RUS)	Thierry Toutain (FRA)	Giovanni Perricelli (ITA)
1998 Budapest	Robert Korzeniowski (POL)	Valentin Kononen (FIN)	Andrey Plotnikov (RUS)
2002 Munich	Robert Korzeniowski (POL)	Aleksey Voyevodin (RUS)	Jesús Ángel García (ESP)
2006 Gothenburg	Yohann Diniz (FRA)	Jesús Ángel García (ESP)	Yuriy Andronov (RUS)
2010 Barcelona	Yohann Diniz (FRA)	Grzegorz Sudoł (POL)	Sergey Bakulin (RUS)
2012 Helsinki	Not included in the program		
2014 Zürich	Yohann Diniz (FRA)	Matej Tóth (SVK)	Ivan Noskov (RUS)
2016 Amsterdam	Not included in the program		
2018 Berlin	Maryan Zakalnytskyy (UKR)	Matej Tóth (SVK)	Dzmitry Dziubin (BLR)

=== 4 × 100 metres relay ===
Games	Gold	Silver	Bronze
1934 Turin	Germany; Egon Schein; Erwin Gillmeister; Gerd Hornberger; Erich Borchmeyer	Hungary; László Forgács; József Kovács; József Sir; Gyula Gyenes	Netherlands; Tinus Osendarp; Tjeerd Boersma; Bob Janssen; Chris Berger
1938 Paris	Germany; Manfred Kersch; Gerd Hornberger; Karl Neckermann; Jakob Scheuring	Sweden; Gösta Klemming; Åke Stenqvist; Lennart Lindgren; Lennart Strandberg	(United Kingdom) Great Britain & N.I. Maurice Scarr; Godfrey Brown; Arthur Sweeney; Ernie Page
1946 Oslo	Sweden; Stig Danielsson; Inge Nilsson; Olle Laessker; Stig Håkansson	France; Agathon Lepève; Julien Lebas; Pierre Gonon; René Valmy	Czechoslovakia; Mirko Paráček; Leopold Láznička; Miroslav Řihošek; Jiří David
1950 Brussels	Soviet Union; Vladimir Sukharev; Levan Kalyayev; Levan Sanadze; Nikolay Karakulov	France; Étienne Bally; Jacques Perlot; Yves Camus; Jean-Pierre Guillon	Sweden; Göte Kjellberg; Leif Christersson; Stig Danielsson; Hans Rydén
1954 Bern	Hungary; László Zarándi; Géza Varasdi; György Csányi; Béla Goldoványi	(United Kingdom) Great Britain & N.I. Ken Box; George Ellis; Ken Jones; Brian Shenton	Soviet Union; Boris Tokarev; Viktor Ryabov; Levan Sanadze; Leonid Bartenyev
1958 Stockholm	West Germany; Walter Mahlendorf; Armin Hary; Heinz Fütterer; Manfred Germar	(United Kingdom) Great Britain & N.I. Peter Radford; Roy Sandstrom; David Segal; Adrian Breacker	Soviet Union; Boris Tokarev; Edvin Ozolin; Yuriy Konovalov; Leonid Bartenyev
1962 Belgrade	West Germany; Klaus Ulonska; Peter Gamper; Hans-Joachim Bender; Manfred Germar	Poland; Jerzy Juskowiak; Andrzej Zieliński; Zbigniew Syka; Marian Foik	(United Kingdom) Great Britain & N.I. Alf Meakin; Ron Jones; Berwyn Jones; David Jones
1966 Budapest	France; Marc Berger; Jocelyn Delecour; Claude Piquemal; Roger Bambuck	Soviet Union; Edvin Ozolin; Amin Tuyakov; Boris Savchuk; Nikolay Ivanov	West Germany; Hans-Jürgen Felsen; Gert Metz; Dieter Enderlein; Manfred Knickenberg
1969 Athens	France; Alain Sarteur; Patrick Bourbeillon; Gérard Fenouil; François Saint-Gilles	Soviet Union; Aleksandr Lebedev; Vladislav Sapeya; Nikolay Ivanov; Valeriy Borzov	Czechoslovakia; Ladislav Kříž; Dionýz Szögedi; Jiří Kynos; Luděk Bohman
1971 Helsinki	Czechoslovakia; Ladislav Kříž; Juraj Demeč; Jiří Kynos; Luděk Bohman	Poland; Gerard Gramse; Tadeusz Cuch; Zenon Nowosz; Marian Dudziak	Italy; Vincenzo Guerini; Pietro Mennea; Pasqualino Abeti; Ennio Preatoni
1974 Rome	France; Lucien Sainte-Rose; Joseph Arame; Bruno Cherrier; Dominique Chauvelot	Italy; Vincenzo Guerini; Norberto Oliosi; Luigi Benedetti; Pietro Mennea	East Germany; Manfred Kokot; Michael Droese; Hans-Jürgen Bombach; Siegfried Schenke
1978 Prague	Poland; Zenon Nowosz; Zenon Licznerski; Leszek Dunecki; Marian Woronin	East Germany; Manfred Kokot; Eugen Ray; Olaf Prenzler; Alexander Thieme	Soviet Union; Sergey Vladimirtsev; Nikolay Kolesnikov; Aleksandr Aksinin; Vladimir Ignatenko
1982 Athens	Soviet Union; Sergey Sokolov; Aleksandr Aksinin; Andrey Prokofyev; Nikolay Sidorov	East Germany; Detlef Kübeck; Olaf Prenzler; Thomas Munkelt; Frank Emmelmann	West Germany; Christian Zirkelbach; Christian Haas; Peter Klein; Erwin Skamrahl
1986 Stuttgart	Soviet Union; Aleksandr Yevgenyev; Nikolay Yushmanov; Vladimir Muravyov; Viktor Bryzhin; Andrey Shlyapnikov	East Germany; Thomas Schröder; Steffen Bringmann; Olaf Prenzler; Frank Emmelmann	(United Kingdom) Great Britain & N.I. Elliot Bunney; Daley Thompson; Mike McFarlane; Linford Christie
1990 Split	France; Max Morinière; Daniel Sangouma; Jean-Charles Trouabal; Bruno Marie-Rose	(United Kingdom) Great Britain & N.I. Darren Braithwaite; John Regis; Marcus Adam; Linford Christie	Italy; Mario Longo; Ezio Madonia; Sandro Floris; Stefano Tilli
1994 Helsinki	France; Hermann Lomba; Daniel Sangouma; Jean-Charles Trouabal; Éric Perrot	Ukraine; Serhiy Osovych; Dmytro Vanyayikin; Oleh Kramarenko; Vladyslav Dolohodin	Italy; Ezio Madonia; Domenico Nettis; Giorgio Marras; Sandro Floris
1998 Budapest	(United Kingdom) Great Britain & N.I. Allyn Condon; Darren Campbell; Douglas Walker; Julian Golding; Marlon Devonish; Dwain Chambers	France; Thierry Lubin; Frédéric Krantz; Christophe Cheval; Needy Guims; Rodrigue Nordin	Poland; Marcin Krzywański; Marcin Nowak; Piotr Balcerzak; Ryszard Pilarczyk
2002 Munich	Ukraine; Kostyantyn Vasyukov; Kostyantyn Rurak; Anatoliy Dovhal; Oleksandr Kaydash	Poland; Ryszard Pilarczyk; Łukasz Chyła; Marcin Nowak; Marcin Urbaś; Piotr Balcerzak	Germany; Ronny Ostwald; Marc Blume; Alexander Kosenkow; Christian Schacht
2006 Gothenburg	(United Kingdom) Great Britain & N.I. Dwain Chambers; Darren Campbell; Marlon Devonish; Mark Lewis-Francis	Poland; Przemysław Rogowski; Łukasz Chyła; Marcin Jędrusiński; Dariusz Kuć	France; Oudéré Kankarafou; Ronald Pognon; Fabrice Calligny; David Alerte
2010 Barcelona	France; Jimmy Vicaut; Christophe Lemaitre; Pierre-Alexis Pessonneaux; Martial Mbandjock; Imaad Hallay	Italy; Roberto Donati; Simone Collio; Emanuele Di Gregorio; Maurizio Checcucci	Germany; Tobias Unger; Marius Broening; Alexander Kosenkow; Martin Keller
2012 Helsinki	Netherlands; Brian Mariano; Churandy Martina; Giovanni Codrington; Patrick van Luijk; Jerrel Feller	Germany; Julian Reus; Tobias Unger; Alexander Kosenkow; Lucas Jakubczyk; Martin Keller	France; Ronald Pognon; Christophe Lemaitre; Pierre-Alexis Pessonneaux; Emmanuel Biron; Jimmy Vicaut
2014 Zürich	(United Kingdom) Great Britain & N.I. James Ellington; Harry Aikines-Aryeetey; Richard Kilty; Adam Gemili; Danny Talbot	Germany; Julian Reus; Sven Knipphals; Alexander Kosenkow; Lucas Jakubczyk	France; Pierre Vincent; Christophe Lemaitre; Teddy Tinmar; Ben Bassaw
2016 Amsterdam	(United Kingdom) Great Britain & N.I. James Dasaolu; Adam Gemili; James Ellington; Chijindu Ujah	France; Marvin René; Stuart Dutamby; Méba-Mickaël Zeze; Jimmy Vicaut	Germany; Julian Reus; Sven Knipphals; Roy Schmidt; Lucas Jakubczyk; Robert Hering
2018 Berlin	(United Kingdom) Great Britain & N.I. Chijindu Ujah; Zharnel Hughes; Adam Gemili; Harry Aikines-Aryeetey; Nethaneel Mitchell-Blake	Turkey; Emre Zafer Barnes; Jak Ali Harvey; Yiğitcan Hekimoğlu; Ramil Guliyev	Netherlands; Chris Garia; Churandy Martina; Hensley Paulina; Taymir Burnet
2022 Munich	(United Kingdom) Great Britain & N.I. Jeremiah Azu; Zharnel Hughes; Jona Efoloko; Nethaneel Mitchell-Blake; Harry Aikines-Aryeetey; Tommy Ramdhan	France; Méba-Mickaël Zeze; Pablo Matéo; Ryan Zeze; Jimmy Vicaut	Poland; Adrian Brzeziński; Przemysław Słowikowski; Patryk Wykrota; Dominik Kopeć; Mateusz Siuda
2024 Rome	Italy; Matteo Melluzzo; Marcell Jacobs; Lorenzo Patta; Filippo Tortu; Roberto Rigali; Lorenzo Simonelli	Netherlands; Elvis Afrifa; Taymir Burnet; Xavi Mo-Ajok; Nsikak Ekpo	Germany; Kevin Kranz; Owen Ansah; Deniz Almas; Lucas Ansah-Peprah
2026 Birmingham	Great Britain (GBR); Jeremiah Azu; Louie Hinchliffe; Zharnel Hughes; Romell Glave	Germany (GER); Kevin Kranz; Marvin Schulte; Heiko Gussmann; Lucas Ansah-Peprah	Belgium (BEL); Ibrahim Camara; Emiel Botterman; Antoine Snyders; Simon Verherstraeten; Amine Kasmi

=== 4 × 400 metres relay ===
Games	Gold	Silver	Bronze
1934 Turin	Germany; Helmut Hamann; Hans Scheele; Harry Voigt; Adolf Metzner	France; Robert Paul; Georges Guillez; Raymond Boisset; Pierre Skawinski	Sweden; Sven Strömberg; Pelle Pihl; Gustav Ericson; Bertil von Wachenfeldt
1938 Paris	Germany; Hermann Blazejezak; Manfred Bues; Erich Linnhoff; Rudolf Harbig	(United Kingdom) Great Britain & N.I. Jack Barnes; Alfred Baldwin; Alan Pennington; Godfrey Brown	Sweden; Lars Nilsson; Carl-Henrik Gustafsson; Börje Thomasson; Bertil von Wachenfeldt
1946 Oslo	France; Bernard Santona; Yves Cros; Robert Chef d'Hôtel; Jacques Lunis	(United Kingdom) Great Britain & N.I. Ronald Ede; Derek Pugh; Bernard Elliott; Bill Roberts	Sweden; Folke Alnevik; Stig Lindgård; Sven-Erik Nolinge; Tore Sten
1950 Brussels	(United Kingdom) Great Britain & N.I. Martin Pike; Leslie Lewis; Angus Scott; Derek Pugh	Italy; Baldassare Porto; Armando Filiput; Luigi Paterlini; Antonio Siddi	Sweden; Gösta Brännström; Tage Ekfeldt; Rune Larsson; Lars-Erik Wolfbrandt
1954 Bern	France; Pierre Haarhoff; Jacques Degats; Jean-Paul Martin du Gard; Jean-Pierre Goudeau	West Germany; Hans Geister; Helmut Dreher; Heinz Ulzheimer; Karl-Friedrich Haas	Finland; Ragnar Graeffe; Ossi Mildh; Rolf Back; Voitto Hellsten
1958 Stockholm	(United Kingdom) Great Britain & N.I. Ted Sampson; John MacIsaac; John Wrighton; John Salisbury	West Germany; Carl Kaufmann; Manfred Poerschke; Johannes Kaiser; Karl-Friedrich Haas	Sweden; Nils Holmberg; Hans Lindgren; Lennart Jonsson; Alf Petersson
1962 Belgrade	West Germany; Johannes Schmitt; Wilfried Kindermann; Hans-Joachim Reske; Manfred Kinder	(United Kingdom) Great Britain & N.I. Barry Jackson; Ken Wilcock; Adrian Metcalfe; Robbie Brightwell	Switzerland; Bruno Galliker; Marius Theiler; Hansruedi Bruder; Jean-Louis Descloux
1966 Budapest	Poland; Jan Werner; Edmund Borowski; Stanisław Grędziński; Andrzej Badeński	West Germany; Fritz Roderfeld; Jens Ulbricht; Rolf Krüsmann; Manfred Kinder	East Germany; Joachim Both; Günther Klann; Michael Zerbes; Wilfried Weiland
1969 Athens	France; Gilles Bertould; Christian Nicolau; Jacques Carette; Jean-Claude Nallet	Soviet Union; Yevgeniy Borisenko; Boris Savchuk; Yuriy Zorin; Aleksandr Bratchikov	West Germany; Horst-Rüdiger Schlöske; Ingo Röper; Gerhard Hennige; Martin Jellinghaus
1971 Helsinki	West Germany; Horst-Rüdiger Schlöske; Thomas Jordan; Martin Jellinghaus; Hermann Köhler	Poland; Andrzej Badeński; Jan Balachowski; Waldemar Korycki; Jan Werner	Italy; Lorenzo Cellerino; Giacomo Puosi; Sergio Bello; Marcello Fiasconaro
1974 Rome	(United Kingdom) Great Britain & N.I. Glen Cohen; Bill Hartley; Alan Pascoe; David Jenkins	West Germany; Hermann Köhler; Horst-Rüdiger Schlöske; Karl Honz; Rolf Ziegler; Bernd Herrmann	Finland; Stig Lönnqvist; Ossi Karttunen; Markku Taskinen; Markku Kukkoaho
1978 Prague	West Germany; Martin Weppler; Franz-Peter Hofmeister; Bernd Herrmann; Harald Schmid	Poland; Jerzy Włodarczyk; Zbigniew Jaremski; Cezary Łapiński; Ryszard Podlas	Czechoslovakia; Josef Lomický; František Břečka; Miroslav Tulis; Karel Kolář
1982 Athens	West Germany; Erwin Skamrahl; Harald Schmid; Thomas Giessing; Hartmut Weber; Edgar Nakladal	(United Kingdom) Great Britain & N.I. David Jenkins; Garry Cook; Todd Bennett; Phil Brown	Soviet Union; Aliaksandr Trashchyla; Pavel Roshchin; Pavel Konovalov; Viktor Markin; Vladimir Prosin
1986 Stuttgart	(United Kingdom) Great Britain & N.I. Derek Redmond; Kriss Akabusi; Brian Whittle; Roger Black; Phil Brown	West Germany; Klaus Just; Edgar Itt; Harald Schmid; Ralf Lübke; Jörg Vaihinger	Soviet Union; Vladimir Prosin; Vladimir Krylov; Arkadiy Kornilov; Aleksandr Kurochkin; Vladimir Volodko
1990 Split	(United Kingdom) Great Britain & N.I. Paul Sanders; Kriss Akabusi; John Regis; Roger Black; Brian Whittle; Phil Brown	West Germany; Klaus Just; Edgar Itt; Carsten Köhrbrück; Norbert Dobeleit; Ulrich Schlepütz; Jörg Vaihinger	East Germany; Rico Lieder; Karsten Just; Thomas Schönlebe; Jens Carlowitz; Jan Lenzke
1994 Helsinki	(United Kingdom) Great Britain & N.I. David McKenzie; Brian Whittle; Roger Black; Du'aine Ladejo	France; Pierre-Marie Hilaire; Jean-Louis Rapnouil; Jacques Farraudière; Stéphane Diagana	Russia; Mikhail Vdovin; Dmitry Kosov; Dmitry Bey; Dmitry Golovastov
1998 Budapest	(United Kingdom) Great Britain & N.I. Mark Hylton; Jamie Baulch; Iwan Thomas; Mark Richardson; Sean Baldock; Solomon Wariso	Poland; Piotr Rysiukiewicz; Tomasz Czubak; Piotr Haczek; Robert Maćkowiak; Piotr Długosielski; Jacek Bocian	Spain; Antonio Andrés; Juan Vicente Trull; Andrés Martinez; David Canal
2002 Munich	(United Kingdom) Great Britain & N.I. Jared Deacon; Matthew Elias; Jamie Baulch; Daniel Caines; Sean Baldock	Russia; Oleg Mishukov; Andrey Semyonov; Ruslan Mashchenko; Yuriy Borzakovskiy; Yevgeniy Lebedev	France; Leslie Djhone; Ahmed Douhou; Naman Keïta; Ibrahima Wade
2006 Gothenburg	France; Leslie Djhone; Ydrissa M'Barke; Naman Keïta; Marc Raquil; Brice Panel; Abderrahim El Haouzy	(United Kingdom) Great Britain & N.I. Robert Tobin; Rhys Williams; Graham Hedman; Tim Benjamin	Poland; Daniel Dąbrowski; Piotr Kędzia; Piotr Rysiukiewicz; Rafał Wieruszewski; Marcin Marciniszyn
2010 Barcelona	Russia; Maksim Dyldin; Aleksey Aksyonov; Pavel Trenikhin; Vladimir Krasnov; Sergey Petukhov	(United Kingdom) Great Britain & N.I. Conrad Williams; Michael Bingham; Robert Tobin; Martyn Rooney; Graham Hedman; Richard Buck	Belgium; Arnaud Destatte; Kevin Borlée; Cédric Van Branteghem; Jonathan Borlée; Antoine Gillet; Nils Duerinck
2012 Helsinki	Belgium; Antoine Gillet; Jonathan Borlée; Jente Bouckaert; Kevin Borlée; Nils Duerinck	(United Kingdom) Great Britain & N.I. Nigel Levine; Conrad Williams; Robert Tobin; Richard Buck; Luke Lennon-Ford; Michael Bingham	Germany; Jonas Plass; Kamghe Gaba; Eric Krüger; Thomas Schneider; Niklas Zender
2014 Zürich	(United Kingdom) Great Britain & N.I. Conrad Williams; Matthew Hudson-Smith; Michael Bingham; Martyn Rooney; Nigel Levine; Rabah Yousif	Poland; Rafał Omelko; Kacper Kozłowski; Łukasz Krawczuk; Jakub Krzewina; Michał Pietrzak; Andrzej Jaros	France; Mame-Ibra Anne; Teddy Atine-Venel; Mamoudou Hanne; Thomas Jordier
2016 Amsterdam	Belgium; Julien Watrin; Jonathan Borlée; Dylan Borlée; Kevin Borlée; Robin Vanderbemden	Poland; Łukasz Krawczuk; Kacper Kozłowski; Jakub Krzewina; Rafał Omelko; Michał Pietrzak	(United Kingdom) Great Britain & N.I. Rabah Yousif; Delano Williams; Jack Green; Matthew Hudson-Smith; Nigel Levine; Jarryd Dunn
2018 Berlin	Belgium; Dylan Borlée; Jonathan Borlée; Jonathan Sacoor; Kevin Borlée; Julien Watrin; Robin Vanderbemden	(United Kingdom) Great Britain & N.I. Rabah Yousif; Dwayne Cowan; Matthew Hudson-Smith; Martyn Rooney; Cameron Chalmers	Spain; Óscar Husillos; Lucas Búa; Samuel García; Bruno Hortelano; Mark Ujakpor; Darwin Echeverry
2022 Munich	(United Kingdom) Great Britain & N.I. Matthew Hudson-Smith; Charlie Dobson; Lewis Davey; Alex Haydock-Wilson; Joe Brier; Rio Mitcham	Belgium; Alexander Doom; Julien Watrin; Kevin Borlée; Dylan Borlée; Jonathan Borlée; Jonathan Sacoor	France; Gilles Biron; Loïc Prévot; Téo Andant; Thomas Jordier; Simon Boypa
2024 Rome	Belgium; Jonathan Sacoor; Robin Vanderbemden; Dylan Borlée; Alexander Doom; Florent Mabille; Christian Iguacel	Italy; Luca Sito; Vladimir Aceti; Riccardo Meli; Edoardo Scotti; Brayan Lopez	Germany; Manuel Sanders; Jean Paul Bredau; Marc Koch; Emil Agyekum; Lukas Krappe; Tyrel Prenz
2026 Birmingham	Italy; Edoardo Scotti; Luca Sito; Mohamed Soudassi; Lorenzo Benati	(United Kingdom) Great Britain & N.I. Matthew Hudson-Smith; Toby Harries; Ben Jefferies; Charles Dobson; Sam Lunt; Malique Smith-Band	Netherlands; Eugene Omalla; Keenan Blake; Terrence Agard; Jonas Phijffers; Liemarvin Bonevacia; Daan Kneppers

== Field ==
=== High jump ===
Games	Gold	Silver	Bronze
1934 Turin	Kalevi Kotkas (FIN)	Birger Halvorsen (NOR)	Veikko Peräsalo (FIN)
1938 Paris	Kurt Lundqvist (SWE)	Kalevi Kotkas (FIN)	Lauri Kalima (FIN)
1946 Oslo	Anton Bolinder (SWE)	Alan Paterson (GBR)	Nils Nicklén (FIN)
1950 Brussels	Alan Paterson (GBR)	Arne Åhman (SWE)	Claude Bénard (FRA)
1954 Bern	Bengt Nilsson (SWE)	Jiří Lanský (TCH)	Jaroslav Kovář (TCH)
1958 Stockholm	Richard Dahl (SWE)	Jiří Lanský (TCH)	Stig Pettersson (SWE)
1962 Belgrade	Valeriy Brumel (URS)	Stig Pettersson (SWE)	Robert Shavlakadze (URS)
1966 Budapest	Jacques Madubost (FRA)	Robert Sainte-Rose (FRA)	Valeriy Skvortsov (URS)
1969 Athens	Valentin Gavrilov (URS)	Reijo Vähälä (FIN)	Erminio Azzaro (ITA)
1971 Helsinki	Kęstutis Šapka (URS)	Csaba Dosa (ROU)	Rustam Akhmetov (URS)
1974 Rome	Jesper Tørring (DEN)	Kęstutis Šapka (URS)	Vladimír Malý (TCH)
1978 Prague	Vladimir Yashchenko (URS)	Aleksandr Grigoryev (URS)	Rolf Beilschmidt (GDR)
1982 Athens	Dietmar Mögenburg (FRG)	Janusz Trzepizur (POL)	Gerd Nagel (FRG)
1986 Stuttgart	Igor Paklin (URS)	Sergey Malchenko (URS)	Carlo Thränhardt (FRG)
1990 Split	Dragutin Topić (YUG)	Aleksey Yemelin (URS)	Georgi Dakov (BUL)
1994 Helsinki	Steinar Hoen (NOR)	Artur Partyka (POL) Steve Smith (GBR)	Not awarded
1998 Budapest	Artur Partyka (POL)	Dalton Grant (GBR)	Sergey Klyugin (RUS)
2002 Munich	Yaroslav Rybakov (RUS)	Stefan Holm (SWE)	Staffan Strand (SWE)
2006 Gothenburg	Andrey Silnov (RUS)	Tomáš Janků (CZE)	Stefan Holm (SWE)
2010 Barcelona	Aleksandr Shustov (RUS)	Ivan Ukhov (RUS)	Martyn Bernard (GBR)
2012 Helsinki	Robbie Grabarz (GBR)	Raivydas Stanys (LTU)	Mickaël Hanany (FRA)
2014 Zürich	Bohdan Bondarenko (UKR)	Andriy Protsenko (UKR)	Jaroslav Bába (CZE)
2016 Amsterdam	Gianmarco Tamberi (ITA)	Robbie Grabarz (GBR)	Chris Baker (GBR) Eike Onnen (GER)
2018 Zürich	Mateusz Przybylko (GER)	Maksim Nedasekau (BLR)	Ilya Ivanyuk (ANA)
2022 Munich	Gianmarco Tamberi (ITA)	Tobias Potye (GER)	Andriy Protsenko (UKR)
2024 Rome	Gianmarco Tamberi (ITA)	Vladyslav Lavskyy (UKR)	Oleh Doroshchuk (UKR)
2026 Birmingham	Gianmarco Tamberi (ITA)	Oleh Doroshchuk (UKR)	Matteo Sioli (ITA)

=== Pole vault ===
Games	Gold	Silver	Bronze
1934 Turin	Gustav Wegner (GER)	Bo Ljungberg (SWE)	John Lindroth (FIN)
1938 Paris	Karl Sutter (GER)	Bo Ljungberg (SWE)	Pierre Ramadier (FRA)
1946 Oslo	Allan Lindberg (SWE)	Nikolay Ozolin (URS)	Jan Bém (TCH)
1950 Brussels	Ragnar Lundberg (SWE)	Valto Olenius (FIN)	Jukka Piironen (FIN)
1954 Bern	Eeles Landström (FIN)	Ragnar Lundberg (SWE)	Geoff Elliott (GBR) Jukka Piironen (FIN)
1958 Stockholm	Eeles Landström (FIN)	Manfred Preußger (GDR)	Vladimir Bulatov (URS)
1962 Belgrade	Pentti Nikula (FIN)	Rudolf Tomášek (TCH)	Kauko Nyström (FIN)
1966 Budapest	Wolfgang Nordwig (GDR)	Christos Papanikolaou (GRE)	Hervé d'Encausse (FRA)
1969 Athens	Wolfgang Nordwig (GDR)	Kjell Isaksson (SWE)	Aldo Righi (ITA)
1971 Helsinki	Wolfgang Nordwig (GDR)	Kjell Isaksson (SWE)	Renato Dionisi (ITA)
1974 Rome	Vladimir Kishkun (URS)	Władysław Kozakiewicz (POL)	Yury Isakov (URS)
1978 Prague	Vladimir Trofimenko (URS)	Antti Kalliomäki (FIN)	Rauli Pudas (FIN)
1982 Athens	Aleksandr Krupskiy (URS)	Vladimir Polyakov (URS)	Atanas Tarev (BUL)
1986 Stuttgart	Sergey Bubka (URS)	Vasiliy Bubka (URS)	Philippe Collet (FRA)
1990 Split	Radion Gataullin (URS)	Grigoriy Yegorov (URS)	Hermann Fehringer (AUT)
1994 Helsinki	Radion Gataullin (RUS)	Igor Trandenkov (RUS)	Jean Galfione (FRA)
1998 Budapest	Maksim Tarasov (RUS)	Tim Lobinger (GER)	Jean Galfione (FRA)
2002 Munich	Aleksandr Averbukh (ISR)	Lars Börgeling (GER)	Tim Lobinger (GER)
2006 Gothenburg	Aleksandr Averbukh (ISR)	Tim Lobinger (GER) Romain Mesnil (FRA)	Not awarded
2010 Barcelona	Renaud Lavillenie (FRA)	Maksym Mazuryk (UKR)	Przemysław Czerwiński (POL)
2012 Helsinki	Renaud Lavillenie (FRA)	Björn Otto (GER)	Raphael Holzdeppe (GER)
2014 Zürich	Renaud Lavillenie (FRA)	Paweł Wojciechowski (POL)	Jan Kudlička (CZE) Kévin Menaldo (FRA)
2016 Amsterdam	Robert Sobera (POL)	Jan Kudlička (CZE)	Robert Renner (SLO)
2018 Berlin	Armand Duplantis (SWE)	Timur Morgunov (ANA)	Renaud Lavillenie (FRA)
2022 Munich	Armand Duplantis (SWE)	Bo Kanda Lita Baehre (GER)	Pål Haugen Lillefosse (NOR)
2024 Rome	Armand Duplantis (SWE)	Emmanouil Karalis (GRE)	Ersu Şaşma (TUR) Oleg Zernikel (GER)
2026 Birmingham	Armand Duplantis (SWE)	Emmanouil Karalis (GRE)	Baptiste Thiery (FRA)

=== Long jump ===
Games	Gold	Silver	Bronze
1934 Turin	Wilhelm Leichum (GER)	Otto Berg (NOR)	Luz Long (GER)
1938 Paris	Wilhelm Leichum (GER)	Arturo Maffei (ITA)	Luz Long (GER)
1946 Oslo	Olle Laessker (SWE)	Lucien Graff (SUI)	Miroslav Řihošek (TCH)
1950 Brussels	Torfi Bryngeirsson (ISL)	Gerard Wessels (NED)	Jaroslav Fikejz (TCH)
1954 Bern	Ödön Földessy (HUN)	Zbigniew Iwański (POL)	Ernest Wanko (FRA)
1958 Stockholm	Igor Ter-Ovanesyan (URS)	Kazimierz Kropidłowski (POL)	Henryk Grabowski (POL)
1962 Belgrade	Igor Ter-Ovanesyan (URS)	Rainer Stenius (FIN)	Pentti Eskola (FIN)
1966 Budapest	Lynn Davies (GBR)	Igor Ter-Ovanesyan (URS)	Jean Cochard (FRA)
1969 Athens	Igor Ter-Ovanesyan (URS)	Lynn Davies (GBR)	Tõnu Lepik (URS)
1971 Helsinki	Max Klauß (GDR)	Igor Ter-Ovanesyan (URS)	Stanisław Szudrowicz (POL)
1974 Rome	Valeriy Pidluzhny (URS)	Nenad Stekić (YUG)	Yevgeniy Shubin (URS)
1978 Prague	Jacques Rousseau (FRA)	Nenad Stekić (YUG)	Vladimir Tsepelyov (URS)
1982 Athens	Lutz Dombrowski (GDR)	Antonio Corgos (ESP)	Jan Leitner (TCH)
1986 Stuttgart	Robert Emmiyan (URS)	Sergey Layevskiy (URS)	Giovanni Evangelisti (ITA)
1990 Split	Dietmar Haaf (FRG)	Ángel Hernández (ESP)	Borut Bilač (YUG)
1994 Helsinki	Ivaylo Mladenov (BUL)	Milan Gombala (CZE)	Konstandinos Koukodimos (GRE)
1998 Budapest	Kirill Sosunov (RUS)	Bogdan Țăruș (ROU)	Petar Dachev (BUL)
2002 Munich	Oleksy Lukashevych (UKR)	Siniša Ergotić (CRO)	Yago Lamela (ESP)
2006 Gothenburg	Andrew Howe (ITA)	Greg Rutherford (GBR)	Oleksy Lukashevych (UKR)
2010 Barcelona	Christian Reif (GER)	Kafétien Gomis (FRA)	Chris Tomlinson (GBR)
2012 Helsinki	Sebastian Bayer (GER)	Luis Felipe Méliz (ESP)	Michel Tornéus (SWE)
2014 Zürich	Greg Rutherford (GBR)	Louis Tsatoumas (GRE)	Kafétien Gomis (FRA)
2016 Amsterdam	Greg Rutherford (GBR)	Michel Tornéus (SWE)	Ignisious Gaisah (NED)
2018 Berlin	Miltiadis Tentoglou (GRE)	Fabian Heinle (GER)	Serhiy Nykyforov (UKR)
2022 Munich	Miltiadis Tentoglou (GRE)	Thobias Montler (SWE)	Jules Pommery (FRA)
2024 Rome	Miltiadis Tentoglou (GRE)	Mattia Furlani (ITA)	Simon Ehammer (SUI)
2026 Birmingham	Miltiadis Tentoglou (GRE)	Simon Ehammer (SUI)	Bozhidar Sarâboyukov (BUL)

=== Triple jump ===
Games	Gold	Silver	Bronze
1934 Turin	Willem Peters (NED)	Erik Svensson (SWE)	Onni Rajasaari (FIN)
1938 Paris	Onni Rajasaari (FIN)	Jouko Norén (FIN)	Karl Kotratschek (GER)
1946 Oslo	Valdemar Rautio (FIN)	Bertil Johnsson (SWE)	Arne Åhman (SWE)
1950 Brussels	Leonid Shcherbakov (URS)	Valdemar Rautio (FIN)	Ruhi Sarıalp (TUR)
1954 Bern	Leonid Shcherbakov (URS)	Roger Norman (SWE)	Martin Řehák (TCH)
1958 Stockholm	Józef Szmidt (POL)	Oleg Ryakhovskiy (URS)	Vilhjálmur Einarsson (ISL)
1962 Belgrade	Józef Szmidt (POL)	Vladimir Goryaev (URS)	Oleg Fedoseyev (URS)
1966 Budapest	Georgi Stoykovski (BUL)	Hans-Jürgen Rückborn (GDR)	Henrik Kalocsai (HUN)
1969 Athens	Viktor Saneyev (URS)	Zoltán Cziffra (HUN)	Klaus Neumann (GDR)
1971 Helsinki	Jörg Drehmel (GDR)	Viktor Saneyev (URS)	Carol Corbu (ROU)
1974 Rome	Viktor Saneyev (URS)	Carol Corbu (ROU)	Andrzej Sontag (POL)
1978 Prague	Miloš Srejović (YUG)	Viktor Saneyev (URS)	Anatoliy Piskulin (URS)
1982 Athens	Keith Connor (GBR)	Vasiliy Grishchenkov (URS)	Béla Bakosi (HUN)
1986 Stuttgart	Khristo Markov (BUL)	Māris Bružiks (URS)	Oleg Protsenko (URS)
1990 Split	Leonid Voloshin (URS)	Khristo Markov (BUL)	Igor Lapshin (URS)
1994 Helsinki	Denis Kapustin (RUS)	Serge Hélan (FRA)	Māris Bružiks (LAT)
1998 Budapest	Jonathan Edwards (GBR)	Denis Kapustin (RUS)	Rostislav Dimitrov (BUL)
2002 Munich	Christian Olsson (SWE)	Charles Friedek (GER)	Jonathan Edwards (GBR)
2006 Gothenburg	Christian Olsson (SWE)	Nathan Douglas (GBR)	Marian Oprea (ROU)
2010 Barcelona	Phillips Idowu (GBR)	Marian Oprea (ROU)	Teddy Tamgho (FRA)
2012 Helsinki	Fabrizio Donato (ITA)	Sheryf El-Sheryf (UKR)	Aliaksei Tsapik (BLR)
2014 Zürich	Benjamin Compaoré (FRA)	Aleksey Fyodorov (RUS)	Yoann Rapinier (FRA)
2016 Amsterdam	Max Heß (GER)	Karol Hoffmann (POL)	Julian Reid (GBR)
2018 Berlin	Nelson Évora (POR)	Alexis Copello (AZE)	Dimitrios Tsiamis (GRE)
2022 Munich	Pedro Pichardo (POR)	Andrea Dallavalle (ITA)	Jean-Marc Pontvianne (FRA)
2024 Rome	Jordan Díaz (ESP)	Pedro Pichardo (POR)	Thomas Gogois (FRA)
2026 Birmingham	Andy Díaz (ITA)	Pedro Pichardo (POR)	Andrea Dallavalle (ITA)

=== Shot put ===
Games	Gold	Silver	Bronze
1934 Turin	Arnold Viiding (EST)	Risto Kuntsi (FIN)	František Douda (TCH)
1938 Paris	Aleksander Kreek (EST)	Gerhard Stöck (GER)	Hans Woellke (GER)
1946 Oslo	Gunnar Huseby (ISL)	Dmitriy Goryainov (URS)	Yrjö Lehtilä (FIN)
1950 Brussels	Gunnar Huseby (ISL)	Angiolo Profeti (ITA)	Oto Grigalka (URS)
1954 Bern	Jiří Skobla (TCH)	Oto Grigalka (URS)	Heino Heinaste (URS)
1958 Stockholm	Arthur Rowe (GBR)	Viktor Lipsnis (URS)	Jiří Skobla (TCH)
1962 Belgrade	Vilmos Varjú (HUN)	Viktor Lipsnis (URS)	Alfred Sosgórnik (POL)
1966 Budapest	Vilmos Varjú (HUN)	Nikolay Karasyov (URS)	Władysław Komar (POL)
1969 Athens	Dieter Hoffmann (GDR)	Heinz-Joachim Rothenburg (GDR)	Hans-Peter Gies (GDR)
1971 Helsinki	Hartmut Briesenick (GDR)	Heinz-Joachim Rothenburg (GDR)	Władysław Komar (POL)
1974 Rome	Hartmut Briesenick (GDR)	Ralf Reichenbach (FRG)	Geoff Capes (GBR)
1978 Prague	Udo Beyer (GDR)	Aleksandr Baryshnikov (URS)	Wolfgang Schmidt (GDR)
1982 Athens	Udo Beyer (GDR)	Jānis Bojārs (URS)	Remigius Machura (TCH)
1986 Stuttgart	Werner Günthör (SUI)	Ulf Timmermann (GDR)	Udo Beyer (GDR)
1990 Split	Ulf Timmermann (GDR)	Oliver-Sven Buder (GDR)	Georg Andersen (NOR)
1994 Helsinki	Aleksandr Klimenko (UKR)	Oleksandr Bagach (UKR)	Roman Virastyuk (UKR)
1998 Budapest	Oleksandr Bagach (UKR)	Oliver-Sven Buder (GER)	Yuriy Bilonoh (UKR)
2002 Munich	Yuriy Bilonoh (UKR)	Joachim B. Olsen (DEN)	Ralf Bartels (GER)
2006 Gothenburg	Ralf Bartels (GER)	Joachim B. Olsen (DEN)	Rutger Smith (NED)
2010 Barcelona	Tomasz Majewski (POL)	Ralf Bartels (GER)	Māris Urtāns (LAT)
2012 Helsinki	David Storl (GER)	Rutger Smith (NED)	Asmir Kolašinac (SRB)
2014 Zürich	David Storl (GER)	Borja Vivas (ESP)	Tomasz Majewski (POL)
2016 Amsterdam	David Storl (GER)	Michał Haratyk (POL)	Tsanko Arnaudov (POR)
2018 Berlin	Michał Haratyk (POL)	Konrad Bukowiecki (POL)	David Storl (GER)
2022 Munich	Filip Mihaljević (CRO)	Armin Sinančević (SRB)	Tomáš Staněk (CZE)
2024 Rome	Leonardo Fabbri (ITA)	Filip Mihaljević (CRO)	Michał Haratyk (POL)
2026 Birmingham	Leonardo Fabbri (ITA)	Zane Weir (ITA)	Wictor Petersson (SWE)

=== Discus throw ===
Games	Gold	Silver	Bronze
1934 Turin	Harald Andersson (SWE)	Paul Winter (FRA)	István Donogán (HUN)
1938 Paris	Willy Schröder (GER)	Giorgio Oberweger (ITA)	Gunnar Bergh (SWE)
1946 Oslo	Adolfo Consolini (ITA)	Giuseppe Tosi (ITA)	Veikko Nyqvist (FIN)
1950 Brussels	Adolfo Consolini (ITA)	Giuseppe Tosi (ITA)	Olli Partanen (FIN)
1954 Bern	Adolfo Consolini (ITA)	Giuseppe Tosi (ITA)	József Szécsényi (HUN)
1958 Stockholm	Edmund Piątkowski (POL)	Todor Artarski (BUL)	Vladimir Trusenyov (URS)
1962 Belgrade	Vladimir Trusenyov (URS)	Cees Koch (NED)	Lothar Milde (GDR)
1966 Budapest	Detlef Thorith (GDR)	Hartmut Losch (GDR)	Lothar Milde (GDR)
1969 Athens	Hartmut Losch (GDR)	Ricky Bruch (SWE)	Lothar Milde (GDR)
1971 Helsinki	Ludvík Daněk (TCH)	Lothar Milde (GDR)	Géza Fejér (HUN)
1974 Rome	Pentti Kahma (FIN)	Ludvík Daněk (TCH)	Ricky Bruch (SWE)
1978 Prague	Wolfgang Schmidt (GDR)	Markku Tuokko (FIN)	Imrich Bugár (TCH)
1982 Athens	Imrich Bugár (TCH)	Ihor Duhinets (URS)	Wolfgang Warnemünde (GDR)
1986 Stuttgart	Romas Ubartas (URS)	Georgiy Kolnootchenko (URS)	Vaclavas Kidykas (URS)
1990 Split	Jürgen Schult (GDR)	Erik de Bruin (NED)	Wolfgang Schmidt (FRG)
1994 Helsinki	Vladimir Dubrovshchik (BLR)	Dmitriy Shevchenko (RUS)	Jürgen Schult (GER)
1998 Budapest	Lars Riedel (GER)	Jürgen Schult (GER)	Virgilijus Alekna (LTU)
2002 Munich	Róbert Fazekas (HUN)	Virgilijus Alekna (LTU)	Michael Möllenbeck (GER)
2006 Gothenburg	Virgilijus Alekna (LTU)	Gerd Kanter (EST)	Aleksander Tammert (EST)
2010 Barcelona	Piotr Małachowski (POL)	Robert Harting (GER)	Róbert Fazekas (HUN)
2012 Helsinki	Robert Harting (GER)	Gerd Kanter (EST)	Rutger Smith (NED)
2014 Zürich	Robert Harting (GER)	Gerd Kanter (EST)	Robert Urbanek (POL)
2016 Amsterdam	Piotr Małachowski (POL)	Philip Milanov (BEL)	Gerd Kanter (EST)
2018 Berlin	Andrius Gudžius (LTU)	Daniel Ståhl (SWE)	Lukas Weißhaidinger (AUT)
2022 Munich	Mykolas Alekna (LTU)	Kristjan Čeh (SLO)	Lawrence Okoye (GBR)
2024 Rome	Kristjan Čeh (SLO)	Lukas Weißhaidinger (AUT)	Mykolas Alekna (LTU)
2026 Birmingham	Kristjan Čeh (SLO)	Mykolas Alekna (LTU)	Henrik Janssen (GER)

=== Hammer throw ===
Games	Gold	Silver	Bronze
1934 Turin	Ville Pörhölä (FIN)	Fernando Vandelli (ITA)	Gunnar Jansson (SWE)
1938 Paris	Karl Hein (GER)	Erwin Blask (GER)	Oscar Malmbrant (SWE)
1946 Oslo	Bo Ericson (SWE)	Eric Johansson (SWE)	Duncan Clark (GBR)
1950 Brussels	Sverre Strandli (NOR)	Teseo Taddia (ITA)	Jiří Dadák (TCH)
1954 Bern	Mikhail Krivonosov (URS)	Sverre Strandli (NOR)	József Csermák (HUN)
1958 Stockholm	Tadeusz Rut (POL)	Mikhail Krivonosov (URS)	Gyula Zsivótzky (HUN)
1962 Belgrade	Gyula Zsivótzky (HUN)	Aleksey Baltovskiy (URS)	Yuriy Bakarinov (URS)
1966 Budapest	Romuald Klim (URS)	Gyula Zsivótzky (HUN)	Uwe Beyer (FRG)
1969 Athens	Anatoliy Bondarchuk (URS)	Romuald Klim (URS)	Reinhard Theimer (GDR)
1971 Helsinki	Uwe Beyer (FRG)	Reinhard Theimer (GDR)	Anatoliy Bondarchuk (URS)
1974 Rome	Aleksey Spiridonov (URS)	Jochen Sachse (GDR)	Reinhard Theimer (GDR)
1978 Prague	Yuriy Sedykh (URS)	Roland Steuk (GDR)	Karl-Hans Riehm (FRG)
1982 Athens	Yuriy Sedykh (URS)	Igor Nikulin (URS)	Sergey Litvinov (URS)
1986 Stuttgart	Yuriy Sedykh (URS)	Sergey Litvinov (URS)	Igor Nikulin (URS)
1990 Split	Igor Astapkovich (URS)	Tibor Gécsek (HUN)	Igor Nikulin (URS)
1994 Helsinki	Vasiliy Sidorenko (RUS)	Igor Astapkovich (BLR)	Heinz Weis (GER)
1998 Budapest	Tibor Gécsek (HUN)	Balázs Kiss (HUN)	Karsten Kobs (GER)
2002 Munich	Adrián Annus (HUN)	Vladyslav Piskunov (UKR)	Alexandros Papadimitriou (GRE)
2006 Gothenburg	Olli-Pekka Karjalainen (FIN)	Vadim Devyatovskiy (BLR)	Markus Esser (GER)
2010 Barcelona	Libor Charfreitag (SVK)	Nicola Vizzoni (ITA)	Krisztián Pars (HUN)
2012 Helsinki	Krisztián Pars (HUN)	Aleksey Zagornyi (RUS)	Szymon Ziółkowski (POL)
2014 Zürich	Krisztián Pars (HUN)	Paweł Fajdek (POL)	Pavel Kryvitski (BLR)
2016 Amsterdam	Paweł Fajdek (POL)	Ivan Tsikhan (BLR)	Wojciech Nowicki (POL)
2018 Berlin	Wojciech Nowicki (POL)	Paweł Fajdek (POL)	Bence Halász (HUN)
2022 Munich	Wojciech Nowicki (POL)	Bence Halász (HUN)	Eivind Henriksen (NOR)
2024 Rome	Wojciech Nowicki (POL)	Bence Halász (HUN)	Mykhaylo Kokhan (UKR)
2026 Birmingham	Bence Halász (HUN)	Merlin Hummel (GER)	Mykhaylo Kokhan (UKR)

=== Javelin throw ===
Games	Gold	Silver	Bronze
1934 Turin	Matti Järvinen (FIN)	Matti Sippala (FIN)	Gustav Sule (EST)
1938 Paris	Matti Järvinen (FIN)	Yrjö Nikkanen (FIN)	József Várszegi (HUN)
1946 Oslo	Lennart Atterwall (SWE)	Yrjö Nikkanen (FIN)	Tapio Rautavaara (FIN)
1950 Brussels	Toivo Hyytiäinen (FIN)	Per-Arne Berglund (SWE)	Ragnar Ericzon (SWE)
1954 Bern	Janusz Sidło (POL)	Vladimir Kuznetsov (URS)	Soini Nikkinen (FIN)
1958 Stockholm	Janusz Sidło (POL)	Egil Danielsen (NOR)	Gergely Kulcsár (HUN)
1962 Belgrade	Jānis Lūsis (URS)	Viktor Tsybulenko (URS)	Władysław Nikiciuk (POL)
1966 Budapest	Jānis Lūsis (URS)	Władysław Nikiciuk (POL)	Gergely Kulcsár (HUN)
1969 Athens	Jānis Lūsis (URS)	Pauli Nevala (FIN)	Janusz Sidło (POL)
1971 Helsinki	Jānis Lūsis (URS)	Jānis Doniņš (URS)	Wolfgang Hanisch (GDR)
1974 Rome	Hannu Siitonen (FIN)	Wolfgang Hanisch (GDR)	Terje Thorslund (NOR)
1978 Prague	Michael Wessing (FRG)	Nikolay Grebnyev (URS)	Wolfgang Hanisch (GDR)
1982 Athens	Uwe Hohn (GDR)	Heino Puuste (URS)	Detlef Michel (GDR)
1986 Stuttgart	Klaus Tafelmeier (FRG)	Detlef Michel (GDR)	Viktor Yevsyukov (URS)
1990 Split	Steve Backley (GBR)	Viktor Zaytsev (URS)	Patrik Bodén (SWE)
1994 Helsinki	Steve Backley (GBR)	Seppo Räty (FIN)	Jan Železný (CZE)
1998 Budapest	Steve Backley (GBR)	Mick Hill (GBR)	Raymond Hecht (GER)
2002 Munich	Steve Backley (GBR)	Sergey Makarov (RUS)	Boris Henry (GER)
2006 Gothenburg	Andreas Thorkildsen (NOR)	Tero Pitkämäki (FIN)	Jan Železný (CZE)
2010 Barcelona	Andreas Thorkildsen (NOR)	Matthias de Zordo (GER)	Tero Pitkämäki (FIN)
2012 Helsinki	Vítězslav Veselý (CZE)	Valeriy Iordan (RUS)	Ari Mannio (FIN)
2014 Zürich	Antti Ruuskanen (FIN)	Vítězslav Veselý (CZE)	Tero Pitkämäki (FIN)
2016 Amsterdam	Zigismunds Sirmais (LAT)	Vítězslav Veselý (CZE)	Antti Ruuskanen (FIN)
2018 Berlin	Thomas Röhler (GER)	Andreas Hofmann (GER)	Magnus Kirt (EST)
2022 Munich	Julian Weber (GER)	Jakub Vadlejch (CZE)	Lassi Etelätalo (FIN)
2024 Rome	Jakub Vadlejch (CZE)	Julian Weber (GER)	Oliver Helander (FIN)
2026 Birmingham	Julian Weber (GER)	Nick Thumm (GER)	Patriks Gailums (LAT)

== Combined ==
=== Decathlon ===
Games	Gold	Silver	Bronze
1934 Turin	Hans-Heinrich Sievert (GER)	Leif Dahlgren (SWE)	Jerzy Pławczyk (POL)
1938 Paris	Olle Bexell (SWE)	Witold Gerutto (POL)	Josef Neumann (SUI)
1946 Oslo	Godtfred Holmvang (NOR)	Sergey Kuznetsov (URS)	Göran Waxberg (SWE)
1950 Brussels	Ignace Heinrich (FRA)	Örn Clausen (ISL)	Kjell Tånnander (SWE)
1954 Bern	Vasili Kuznetsov (URS)	Torbjörn Lassenius (FIN)	Heinz Oberbeck (FRG)
1958 Stockholm	Vasili Kuznetsov (URS)	Uno Palu (URS)	Walter Meier (GDR)
1962 Belgrade	Vasili Kuznetsov (URS)	Werner von Moltke (FRG)	Manfred Bock (FRG)
1966 Budapest	Werner von Moltke (FRG)	Jörg Mattheis (FRG)	Horst Beyer (FRG)
1969 Athens	Joachim Kirst (GDR)	Herbert Wessel (GDR)	Viktor Chelnokov (URS)
1971 Helsinki	Joachim Kirst (GDR)	Lennart Hedmark (SWE)	Hans-Joachim Walde (FRG)
1974 Rome	Ryszard Skowronek (POL)	Yves Le Roy (FRA)	Guido Kratschmer (FRG)
1978 Prague	Aleksandr Grebenyuk (URS)	Daley Thompson (GBR)	Siegfried Stark (GDR)
1982 Athens	Daley Thompson (GBR)	Jürgen Hingsen (FRG)	Siegfried Stark (GDR)
1986 Stuttgart	Daley Thompson (GBR)	Jürgen Hingsen (FRG)	Siegfried Wentz (FRG)
1990 Split	Christian Plaziat (FRA)	Dezső Szabó (HUN)	Christian Schenk (GDR)
1994 Helsinki	Alain Blondel (FRA)	Henrik Dagård (SWE)	Lev Lobodin (UKR)
1998 Budapest	Erki Nool (EST)	Eduard Hämäläinen (FIN)	Lev Lobodin (RUS)
2002 Munich	Roman Šebrle (CZE)	Erki Nool (EST)	Lev Lobodin (RUS)
2006 Gothenburg	Roman Šebrle (CZE)	Attila Zsivoczky (HUN)	Aleksey Drozdov (RUS)
2010 Barcelona	Romain Barras (FRA)	Eelco Sintnicolaas (NED)	Andrei Krauchanka (BLR)
2012 Helsinki	Pascal Behrenbruch (GER)	Oleksiy Kasyanov (UKR)	Ilya Shkurenyov (RUS)
2014 Zürich	Andrei Krauchanka (BLR)	Kevin Mayer (FRA)	Ilya Shkurenyov (RUS)
2016 Amsterdam	Thomas Van der Plaetsen (BEL)	Adam Helcelet (CZE)	Mihail Dudaš (SRB)
2018 Berlin	Arthur Abele (GER)	Ilya Shkurenyov (ANA)	Vital Zhuk (BLR)
2022 Munich	Niklas Kaul (GER)	Simon Ehammer (SUI)	Janek Õiglane (EST)
2024 Rome	Johannes Erm (EST)	Sander Skotheim (NOR)	Makenson Gletty (FRA)
2026 Birmingham	Leo Neugebauer (GER)	Niklas Kaul (GER)	Sander Skotheim (NOR)

== Mixed event ==
=== Mixed 4 × 400 metres relay ===
Games	Gold	Silver	Bronze
2024 Rome	Ireland; Christopher O'Donnell; Rhasidat Adeleke; Thomas Barr; Sharlene Mawdsley	Italy; Luca Sito; Anna Polinari; Edoardo Scotti; Alice Mangione	Netherlands; Liemarvin Bonevacia; Lieke Klaver; Isaya Klein Ikkink; Femke Bol
2026 Birmingham	Norway; Karsten Warholm; Amalie Iuel; Andreas Ofstad Kulseng; Henriette Jæger	Great Britain; Ben Jefferies; Charlotte Henrich; Toby Harries; Yemi Mary John	Netherlands; Jonas Phijffers; Lieke Klaver; Terrence Agard; Myrte van der Schoot

== See also ==
- List of European Athletics Championships medalists (women)
- List of World Athletics Championships medalists (men)
- List of World Athletics Championships medalists (women)

== General references ==
- Statistics Handbook 2024 European Athletics Championships. European Athletics.
- European Athletics Championships - Past Editions.
- 2024 results and medal table.
- European Championships (Men). GBR Athletics.
- European Championships. Sports123 - Athletics.
- Leichtathletik - Historie in Zahlen - Europameisterschaften - Bahn (Herren). Sport-komplett (in German).
- Europameister in der Leichtathletik. IfoSta (in German).
