= 1954 European Athletics Championships – Men's 4 × 400 metres relay =

Men's 4 × 400 metres relay at the European Athletics Championships

The men's 4 × 400 metres relay at the 1954 European Athletics Championships was held in Bern, Switzerland, at Stadion Neufeld on 28 and 29 August 1954.

== Medalists ==
Gold	Pierre Haarhoff; Jacques Degats; Jean-Paul Martin-du-Gard; Jean-Pierre Goudeau; France
Silver	Hans Geister; Helmut Dreher; Heinz Ulzheimer; Karl-Friedrich Haas; West Germany
Bronze	Ragnar Graeffe; Sven-Oswald Mildh; Rolf Back; Voitto Hellsten; Finland

== Results ==
=== Final ===
29 August

Rank	Nation	Competitors	Time	Notes
1st place, gold medalist(s)	France	Pierre Haarhoff; Jacques Degats; Jean-Paul Martin-du-Gard; Jean-Pierre Goudeau	3:08.7	CR NR
2nd place, silver medalist(s)	West Germany	Hans Geister; Helmut Dreher; Heinz Ulzheimer; Karl-Friedrich Haas	3:08.8	
3rd place, bronze medalist(s)	Finland	Ragnar Graeffe; Sven-Oswald Mildh; Rolf Back; Voitto Hellsten	3:11.5	
4	Sweden	Gösta Brännström; Uno Elofsson; Tage Ekfeldt; Lars-Erik Wolfbrandt	3:12.5	
5	Hungary	Péter Karádi; Lajos Szentgáli; Egon Solymossy; Zoltán Adamik	3:26.1	
	Great Britain	Peter Higgins; Alan Dick; Peter Fryer; Derek Johnson	DQ	

=== Heats ===
28 August

==== Heat 1 ====
Rank	Nation	Competitors	Time	Notes
1	Hungary	Péter Karádi; Lajos Szentgáli; Egon Solymossy; Zoltán Adamik	3:12.0	Q
2	Sweden	Gösta Brännström; Uno Elofsson; Tage Ekfeldt; Lars-Erik Wolfbrandt	3:12.8	Q
3	Soviet Union	Oleg Ageyev; Edmunds Pīlāgs; Timofey Shevchenko; Yuriy Bitter	3:14.1	
4	Austria	Gerald Wicher; Rudolf Haidegger; Hans Muchitsch; Ernst Suppan	3:25.7	

==== Heat 2 ====
Rank	Nation	Competitors	Time	Notes
1	West Germany	Hans Geister; Helmut Dreher; Heinz Ulzheimer; Karl-Friedrich Haas	3:09.7	CR Q
2	France	Pierre Haarhoff; Jacques Degats; Jean-Paul Martin-du-Gard; Jean-Pierre Goudeau	3:11.2	Q
3	Switzerland	René Weber; Josef Steger; Ernst Vogel; Jean-Jacques Hegg	3:13.4	

==== Heat 3 ====
Rank	Nation	Competitors	Time	Notes
1	Great Britain	Peter Higgins; Alan Dick; Peter Fryer; Derek Johnson	3:10.8	Q
2	Finland	Ragnar Graeffe; Sven-Oswald Mildh; Rolf Back; Voitto Hellsten	3:11.3	NR Q
3	Poland	Stanisław Swatowski; Zbigniew Makomaski; Lech Sierek; Gerard Mach	3:13.1	NR
4	Belgium	Charles Cuvelier; Roger Moens; Lucien De Muynck; Dirk Stoclet	3:15.9	

== Participation ==
According to an unofficial count, 44 athletes from 11 countries participated in the event.

- Austria (4)
- Belgium (4)
- Finland (4)
- France (4)
- Hungary (4)
- Poland (4)
- Soviet Union (4)
- Sweden (4)
- Switzerland (4)
- Great Britain (4)
- West Germany (4)
