= 1954 European Athletics Championships – Men's 400 metres =

Men's 400 metres at the European Athletics Championships

The men's 400 metres at the 1954 European Athletics Championships was held in Bern, Switzerland, at Stadion Neufeld on 25, 26, and 27 August 1954.

== Medalists ==
Gold	Ardalion Ignatyev; Soviet Union
Silver	Voitto Hellstén; Finland
Bronze	Zoltán Adamik; Hungary

== Results ==
=== Final ===
27 August

Rank	Name	Nationality	Time	Notes
1st place, gold medalist(s)	Ardalion Ignatyev	Soviet Union	46.6	CR NR
2nd place, silver medalist(s)	Voitto Hellstén	Finland	47.0	NR
3rd place, bronze medalist(s)	Zoltán Adamik	Hungary	47.6	NR
4	Karl-Friedrich Haas	West Germany	47.6	
5	Jean-Jacques Hegg	Switzerland	47.8	
	Jacques Degats	France	DQ	

=== Semi-finals ===
26 August

==== Semi-final 1 ====
Rank	Name	Nationality	Time	Notes
1	Ardalion Ignatyev	Soviet Union	47.0	CR Q
2	Voitto Hellstén	Finland	47.1	NR Q
3	Jacques Degats	France	47.8	Q
4	Vincenzo Lombardo	Italy	48.4	
5	Lars-Erik Wolfbrandt	Sweden	48.8	
	Hans Geister	West Germany	DQ	

==== Semi-final 2 ====
Rank	Name	Nationality	Time	Notes
1	Karl-Friedrich Haas	West Germany	47.9	Q
2	Zoltán Adamik	Hungary	48.1	Q
3	Jean-Jacques Hegg	Switzerland	48.1	Q
4	Jean-Paul Martin-du-Gard	France	48.2	
5	Alan Dick	Great Britain	48.3	
6	Rolf Back	Finland	48.9	

=== Heats ===
25 August

==== Heat 1 ====
Rank	Name	Nationality	Time	Notes
1	Ardalion Ignatyev	Soviet Union	47.9	Q
2	Vincenzo Lombardo	Italy	48.2	Q
3	Gerard Mach	Poland	48.9	
4	José Fórmiga	Spain	50.3	
5	Gerald Wicher	Austria	51.8	

==== Heat 2 ====
Rank	Name	Nationality	Time	Notes
1	Hans Geister	West Germany	47.9	Q
2	Rolf Back	Finland	48.4	Q
3	Edmunds Pīlāgs	Soviet Union	48.8	
4	Charles Cuvelier	Belgium	50.3	

==== Heat 3 ====
Rank	Name	Nationality	Time	Notes
1	Voitto Hellstén	Finland	47.7	Q
2	Karl-Friedrich Haas	West Germany	47.8	Q
3	Peter Fryer	Great Britain	48.0	
4	Rudolf Haidegger	Austria	51.4	

==== Heat 4 ====
Rank	Name	Nationality	Time	Notes
1	Jean-Paul Martin-du-Gard	France	48.4	Q
2	Lars-Erik Wolfbrandt	Sweden	48.7	Q
3	Vasilios Sillis	Greece	48.8	
4	Lech Sierek	Poland	49.6	

==== Heat 5 ====
Rank	Name	Nationality	Time	Notes
1	Zoltán Adamik	Hungary	47.9	Q
2	Alan Dick	Great Britain	48.4	Q
3	Gösta Brännström	Sweden	48.7	
4	René Weber	Switzerland	49.3	

==== Heat 6 ====
Rank	Name	Nationality	Time	Notes
1	Jean-Jacques Hegg	Switzerland	47.7	Q
2	Jacques Degats	France	48.5	Q
3	Marcello Dani	Italy	49.1	
4	Egon Solymossy	Hungary	49.4	

== Participation ==
According to an unofficial count, 25 athletes from 14 countries participated in the event.

- Austria (2)
- Belgium (1)
- Finland (2)
- France (2)
- Greece (1)
- Hungary (2)
- Italy (2)
- Poland (2)
- Soviet Union (2)
- Spain (1)
- Sweden (2)
- Switzerland (2)
- Great Britain (2)
- West Germany (2)
