= 1954 European Athletics Championships – Men's 800 metres =

Men's 800 metres at the European Athletics Championships

The men's 800 metres at the 1954 European Athletics Championships was held in Bern, Switzerland, at Stadion Neufeld on 25, 27, and 28 August 1954.

== Medalists ==
Gold	Lajos Szentgáli; Hungary
Silver	Lucien De Muynck; Belgium
Bronze	Audun Boysen; Norway

== Results ==
=== Final ===
28 August

Rank	Name	Nationality	Time	Notes
1st place, gold medalist(s)	Lajos Szentgáli	Hungary	1:47.1	CR NR
2nd place, silver medalist(s)	Lucien De Muynck	Belgium	1:47.3	NR
3rd place, bronze medalist(s)	Audun Boysen	Norway	1:47.4	NR
4	Derek Johnson	Great Britain	1:47.4	
5	Roger Moens	Belgium	1:47.8	
6	Gérard Rasquin	Luxembourg	1:51.4	
7	Tage Ekfeldt	Sweden	1:53.8	
8	Ron Delany	Ireland	2:03.5	

=== Semi-finals ===
27 August

==== Semi-final 1 ====
Rank	Name	Nationality	Time	Notes
1	Lajos Szentgáli	Hungary	1:50.0	CR Q
2	Ron Delany	Ireland	1:50.2	NR Q
3	Lucien De Muynck	Belgium	1:50.3	Q
4	Tage Ekfeldt	Sweden	1:50.3	Q
5	Edmund Potrzebowski	Poland	1:51.2	
6	Brian Hewson	Great Britain	1:51.2	
7	Olaf Lawrenz	West Germany	1:51.4	
8	Urpo Vähäranta	Finland	1:51.4	

==== Semi-final 2 ====
Rank	Name	Nationality	Time	Notes
1	Audun Boysen	Norway	1:50.6	Q
2	Roger Moens	Belgium	1:50.7	Q
3	Derek Johnson	Great Britain	1:51.0	Q
4	Gérard Rasquin	Luxembourg	1:51.5	Q
5	René Djian	France	1:51.8	
6	Friedel Stracke	West Germany	1:52.3	
7	Oleg Ageyev	Soviet Union	1:52.5	
8	István Bárkányi	Hungary	1:52.8	

=== Heats ===
25 August

==== Heat 1 ====
Rank	Name	Nationality	Time	Notes
1	Olaf Lawrenz	West Germany	1:52.0	Q
2	Lucien De Muynck	Belgium	1:52.2	Q
3	István Bárkányi	Hungary	1:52.4	Q
4	Tage Ekfeldt	Sweden	1:52.4	Q
5	Tauno Kontio	Finland	1:52.8	
6	Ludvík Liška	Czechoslovakia	1:53.2	
7	Alfred Lasch	Austria	1:55.4	
8	Manuel Macías	Spain	1:56.7	

==== Heat 2 ====
Rank	Name	Nationality	Time	Notes
1	Lajos Szentgáli	Hungary	1:51.8	Q
2	Derek Johnson	Great Britain	1:51.8	Q
3	Edmund Potrzebowski	Poland	1:52.3	Q
4	René Djian	France	1:52.8	Q
5	Josef Steger	Switzerland	1:53.5	
6	Ekrem Koçak	Turkey	1:56.2	

==== Heat 3 ====
Rank	Name	Nationality	Time	Notes
1	Brian Hewson	Great Britain	1:50.2	CR Q
2	Audun Boysen	Norway	1:50.3	Q
3	Gérard Rasquin	Luxembourg	1:51.6	Q
4	Oleg Ageyev	Soviet Union	1:51.7	Q
5	Evangelos Depastas	Greece	1:52.7	
6	Hugo Wallkamm	Switzerland	1:55.1	
7	Patrick El Mabrouk	France	1:56.0	
8	Ernst Suppan	Austria	1:58.4	
9	Ünal Somuncuoğlu	Turkey	2:02.6	

==== Heat 4 ====
Rank	Name	Nationality	Time	Notes
1	Roger Moens	Belgium	1:51.5	Q
2	Ron Delany	Ireland	1:51.8	Q
3	Friedel Stracke	West Germany	1:52.1	Q
4	Urpo Vähäranta	Finland	1:52.2	Q
5	Hans Ring	Sweden	1:52.7	
6	Georgiy Ivakin	Soviet Union	1:53.9	
7	Dušan Čikel	Czechoslovakia	1:54.2	
8	Miloje Grujić	Yugoslavia	1:55.7	

== Participation ==
According to an unofficial count, 31 athletes from 19 countries participated in the event.

- Austria (2)
- Belgium (2)
- Czechoslovakia (2)
- Finland (2)
- France (2)
- Greece (1)
- Hungary (2)
- Ireland (1)
- Luxembourg (1)
- Norway (1)
- Poland (1)
- Soviet Union (2)
- Spain (1)
- Sweden (2)
- Switzerland (2)
- Turkey (2)
- Great Britain (2)
- West Germany (2)
- Yugoslavia (1)
