= Günther Steines =

German sprinter

Olympic medal record

Men's athletics

Representing Germany
Bronze medal – third place	1952 Helsinki	4 × 400 metres relay

Günther Steines (September 28, 1928 in Trier-Pfalzel – June 4, 1982 in Ahrweiler) was a German track and field athlete, who mainly competed in the 800 metres event.

He competed in the 4 × 400 metres relay for Germany at the 1952 Summer Olympics held in Helsinki, Finland, where he won the bronze medal with his teammates Hans Geister, Heinz Ulzheimer and Karl-Friedrich Haas. In the 800 metre final in Helsinki he placed sixth.
