= Heinz Ulzheimer =

German middle-distance runner

Medal record

Men's athletics

Representing Germany

Olympic Games
| Bronze medal – third place | 1952 Helsinki | 800 m |
| Bronze medal – third place | 1952 Helsinki | 4×400 m |

European Championships
| Silver medal – second place | 1954 Bern | 4×400 m |

Heinz Ulzheimer (December 27, 1925 – December 18, 2016) was a West German track and field athlete, who mainly competed in the 800 metres. He was born in Höchst. He competed in the 800 metres for Germany at the 1952 Summer Olympics held in Helsinki, Finland, where he won the bronze medal. He then assisted the German team in the 4 × 400 metre relay where he won the bronze medal with his teammates Hans Geister, Günther Steines and Karl-Friedrich Haas. He died at the age of 90 in 2016.
