= Jean-Pierre Goudeau =

French sprinter (1933–2024)

Medal record

Men's athletics

Representing France

European Championships
Gold medal – first place	1954 Bern	4×400 m

Jean-Pierre Goudeau (25 February 1933 in Paris – 18 July 2024 in Boulogne-Billancourt) was a French athlete who competed in the 1952 Summer Olympics and in the 1956 Summer Olympics as a runner.
