= Ardalion Ignatyev =

Soviet athlete (1930–1998)

Medal record

Men's athletics

Representing Soviet Union

Olympic Games
| Bronze medal – third place | 1956 Melbourne | 400 m |

European Championships
| Gold medal – first place | 1954 Bern | 400 m |
| Silver medal – second place | 1954 Bern | 200 m |

Ardalion Vasilyevich Ignatyev (Russian: Ардалион Васи́льевич Игна́тьев; November 24, 1930 – October 24, 1998) was a Soviet athlete who mainly competed in the 400 metres. He was born in the village of Novoye Toyderyakovo, Yalchiksky District, Chuvash ASSR.

He was European champion over 400 metres in 1954, when he also won a silver medal over 200 metres. He competed for the USSR in the 1956 Summer Olympics held in Melbourne, Australia in the 400 metres where he won the bronze medal jointly with Finland's Voitto Hellsten. After his career was finished, Ignatyev worked at sports school in Cheboksary as a director, and was also a lecturer at Yakovlev Chuvash State Pedagogical University from 1970 to 1976.

Records
| Preceded by (West Germany) Rudolf Harbig | European Record Holder Men's 400 m 25 June 1955 - 18 September 1959 | Succeeded by (West Germany) Carl Kaufmann |
