= Ossi Mildh =

Finnish sprinter and hurdler

Medal record

Men's athletics

Representing Finland

European Championships
Bronze medal – third place	1954 Bern	400 m hurdles
Bronze medal – third place	1954 Bern	4×400 m

Sven Osvald "Ossi" Mildh (12 May 1930 – 16 September 2015) was a Finnish hurdler. Mildh won bronze medals at the 1954 European Championships in the 400 metres hurdles and the 4 × 400 metres relay.

== Career ==
Mildh was Finnish champion three times in the 400 m hurdles and once in the 110 m hurdles. At the 1954 European Championships in Bern he won an unexpected bronze medal in the 400 m hurdles in 51.5. The time which was a new Finnish record, would remain his personal best and was only broken as the record of his club, HIFK, in 2014. He won another bronze in the 4 × 400 metres relay as part of the Finnish team; Finland originally finished fourth, but moved up a spot when Great Britain was disqualified.

He competed in the Olympics twice, in 1952 (400 m and 4 × 400 m) and 1956 (400 m hurdles and 4 × 400 m). He never managed to qualify from the first round; although he ran 52.19 in the hurdles at the 1956 Olympics in Melbourne, it was only good enough for third in his heat behind Yuriy Lituyev and Gert Potgieter, and only the top two made it to the semi-finals.
