= Andreas Ofstad Kulseng =

Norwegian sprinter (born 2001)

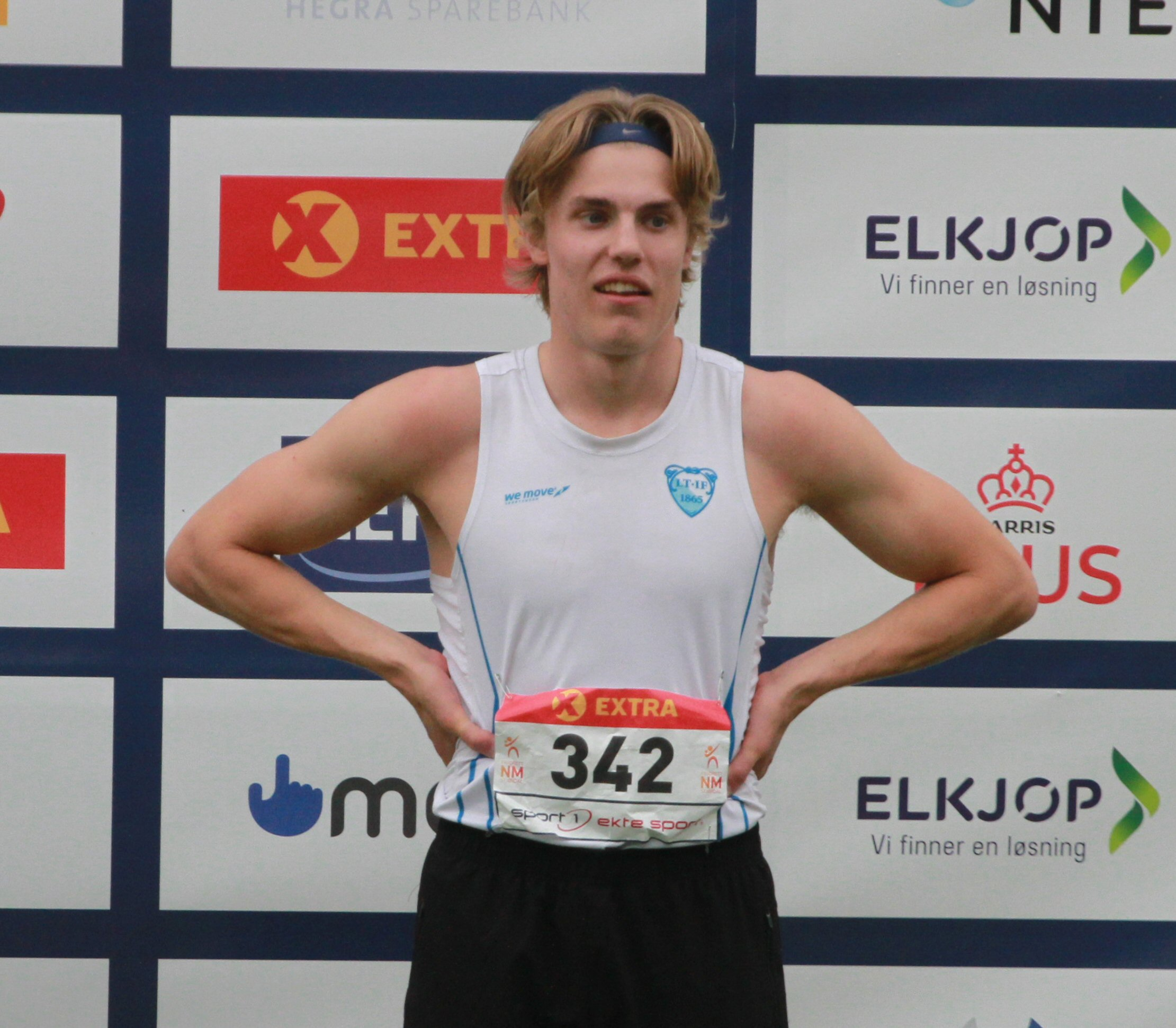

Personal information
- Nationality: Norwegian
- Born: 19 May 2001 (age 25)

Sport
- Country: Norway
- Sport: Athletics
- Event: Sprint
- Club: IK Tjalve
Medal record
Men's athletics
Representing Norway
European Championships
Gold medal – first place	2026 Birmingham	4 × 400 m mixed

Andreas Ofstad Kulseng (born 19 May 2001) is a Norwegian sprinter. He has won Norwegian Championships titles over 200 metres and 400 metres. He won the gold medal with the Norwegian mixed 4 × 400 m relay team at the 2026 European Championships.

== Biography ==
From Larvik, he was a member of his local club Larvik Turn, later becoming a member of IK Tjalve in Oslo. He set a new Norwegian best in the 300 meters with 32.19 seconds at the 2025 Bislett Games in June 2025, breaking the previous best set by Karsten Warholm of 32.49. That month, he was part of the team that set a Norwegian record in the men's 4 × 100 metres relay of 38.86 seconds at the 2025 European Athletics Team Championships in Maribor, Slovenia, improving the previous record from 1997 by a tenth of a second. In August, he won the 2025 Norwegian Championships over 200 metres. He finished the year as Norway's fastest athlete in the 200 meters by time, and also ranked second overall in the 400 meters.

In July 2026, he retained his national title over 200 metres and also won the Norwegian Championships title over 400 metres. Kulseng was selected to represent Norway at the 2026 European Athletics Championships in Birmingham, England. On the opening day of the championships he won a gold medal in the mixed 4 × 400 metres relay alongside Warholm, Amalie Iuel and Henriette Jæger; the quartet setting a new championship record time of 3:09.62. He also competed in the men's 200 metres at the championships.
