= Péter Karádi =

Hungarian sprinter

Personal information
- Nationality: Hungarian
- Born: 6 December 1926 Budapest, Hungary
- Died: 7 June 2011 (aged 84) Budapest, Hungary

Sport
- Sport: Sprinting
- Event: 200 metres

Péter Karádi (6 December 1926 – 7 June 2011) was a Hungarian sprinter. He competed in the men's 200 metres at the 1952 Summer Olympics.
