= Urpo Vähäranta =

Finnish middle-distance runner

Personal information
- Nationality: Finnish
- Born: 15 June 1926 Uusikaupunki, Finland
- Died: 20 September 2011 (aged 85)

Sport
- Sport: Middle-distance running
- Event: 1500 metres

Urpo Vähäranta (15 June 1926 – 20 September 2011) was a Finnish middle-distance runner. He competed in the men's 1500 metres at the 1952 Summer Olympics. At the 1954 European Championships in Bern, he was eliminated in the semi-finals of the 800 metres event.
