= Audun Boysen =

Norwegian middle-distance runner

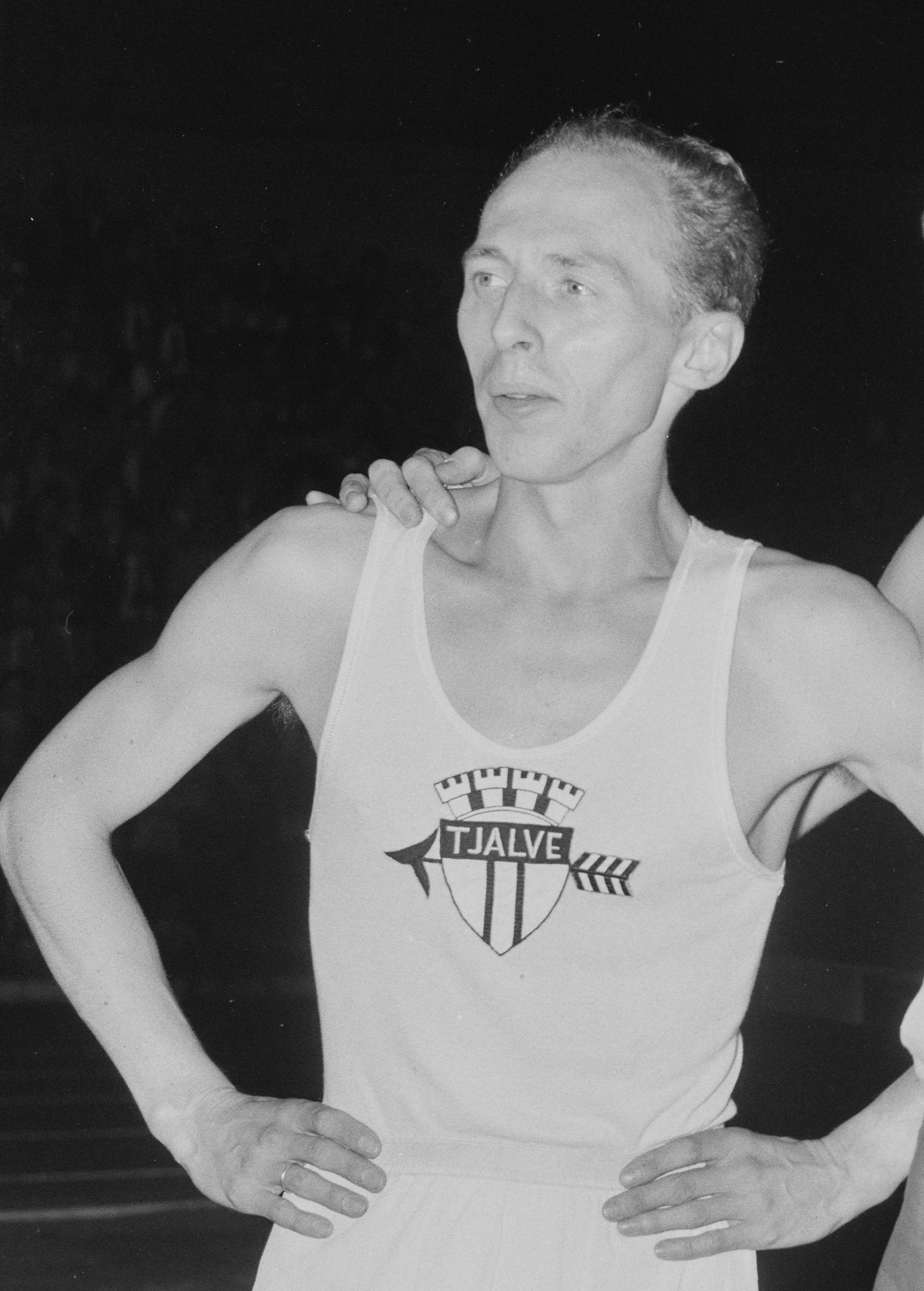

Personal information
- Born: 10 May 1929
- Died: 2 March 2000 (aged 70)
Medal record
Men's athletics
Representing Norway
Olympic Games
Bronze medal – third place	1956 Melbourne	800 m
European Championships
Silver medal – second place	1958 Stockholm	800 m
Bronze medal – third place	1954 Bern	800 m

Audun Boysen (10 May 1929 – 2 March 2000) was a Norwegian middle distance runner. Born in Bjarkøy and raised in Rissa, he first represented Rissa IL and later IK Tjalve in Oslo.

Boysen was a prominent 800 metre runner in the 1950s, and he won a bronze medal at the 1956 Summer Olympics, a silver medal at the 1958 European Championships and another bronze at the 1954 European Championships. He set three world records over 1,000 metres, the last being 2:19.0 in 1955.

The same year he ran 800 metres (2,600 ft) in 1:45.9, a new Norwegian record, finishing second to Belgian Roger Moens, who ran a world record time, with Boysen also under the old record. That Norwegian record stood for 37 years until 3 July 1992 when it was broken by Atle Douglas (1:45.15) and Vebjørn Rodal (1:45.33). Rodal became Olympic champion four years later.

Awards
Preceded by Stein Eriksen	Norwegian Sportsperson of the Year; 1955	Succeeded by Egil Danielsen
