= Ben Jefferies =

British athlete (born 1999)

Personal information
- Nationality: British (English)
- Born: 10 September 1999 (age 26) Bristol, England

Sport
- Sport: Track and Field
- Event: 400 metres
- Club: Bristol & West/Briar Cliff
Medal record
Men's athletics
Representing Great Britain
European Championships
Silver medal – second place	2026 Birmingham	4 × 400 m relay
Silver medal – second place	2026 Birmingham	4 × 400 m mixed

Ben Jefferies (born 10 September 1999) is a British athlete specialising in the 400 metres.

== Biography ==
He competed at the collegiate level at Briar Cliff University in Sioux City, Iowa.

After winning the 400 metres silver medal at the 2024 British Athletics Championships, Jefferies was subsequently named in the Great Britain team for the 2024 Summer Olympics.

Jefferies was a member of the Great Britain team which won the silver medal in the mixed 4 × 400 m relay at the 2026 European Championships.
