= Ragnar Graeffe =

Finnish sprinter and hurdler

Personal information
- Nationality: Finnish
- Born: 16 September 1929
- Died: 28 August 2005 (aged 75)

Sport
- Sport: Sprinting
- Event: 4 × 400 metres relay
Medal record
Men's athletics
Representing Finland
European Championships
Bronze medal – third place	1954 Bern	4×400 m

Ragnar Graeffe (16 September 1929 – 28 August 2005) was a Finnish sprinter. He competed in the men's 4 × 400 metres relay at the 1952 Summer Olympics.
