= Voitto Hellsten =

Finnish sprinter (1932–1998)

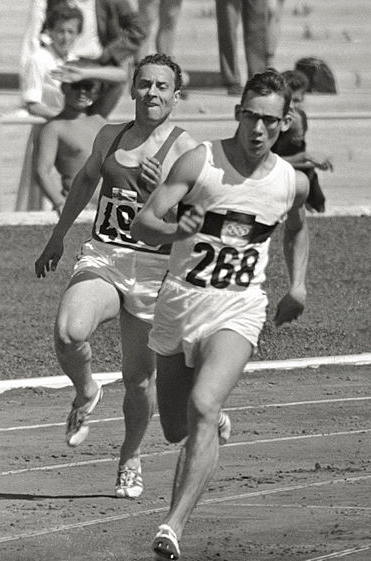
- Voitto Hellsten chasing Hans-Joachim Reske in the 400 m heats at the 1960 Olympics

Personal information
- Born: 15 February 1932 Pertteli, Finland
- Died: 7 December 1998 (aged 66) Turku, Finland
- Height: 1.60 m (5 ft 3 in)
- Weight: 70–74 kg (154–163 lb)

Sport
- Sport: Athletics
- Event: 100, 200, 400 m
- Club: TuTo, Turku

Achievements and titles
- Personal best(s): 100 m – 10.6 (1955); 200 m – 21.3 (1956); 400 m – 46.20 (1956)
Medal record
Men's athletics
Representing Finland
Olympic Games
Bronze medal – third place	1956 Melbourne	400 m
European Championships
Silver medal – second place	1954 Bern	400 m
Bronze medal – third place	1954 Bern	4×400 m

Voitto Valdemar Hellsten (15 February 1932 – 7 December 1998), sometimes spelled as Voitto Hellstén, was a Finnish sprinter. Hellsten competed in 100–400 m events at the 1952, 1956 and 1960 Olympics and won a bronze medal in the 400 m in 1956, shared with Ardalion Ignatyev.

Hellsten was often successful at the annual athletics meetings between Finland and Sweden.

From 1962 to 1970, Voitto Hellsten was a member of the Finnish parliament, where he represented the Social Democratic Party.
