= Zoltán Adamik =

Hungarian sprinter (1928–1992)

Personal information
- Born: 20 October 1928 Szolnok
- Died: 7 December 1992 (aged 64)

Sport
- Sport: Athletics
Medal record
Men's athletics
Representing Hungary
European Championships
Bronze medal – third place	1954 Bern	400 m

Zoltán Adamik (20 October 1928 – 7 December 1992) was a Hungarian sprinter who competed in the 1952 Summer Olympics. He was born in Szolnok.
