= Jacques Degats =

French sprinter (1930–2015)

Personal information
- Full name: Jacques Léopold Degats
- Born: 20 February 1930 Vendrest, France
- Died: 29 March 2015 (aged 85) Nemours, France
- Height: 180 cm (5 ft 11 in)
- Weight: 76 kg (168 lb)

Sport
- Country: France
- Sport: Athletics (track and field)
- Club: Racing Club de France
Medal record
Men's athletics
Representing France
European Championships
Gold medal – first place	1954 Bern	4×400 m

Jacques Léopold Degats (20 February 1930 – 29 March 2015) was a French athlete who competed in the 1952 Summer Olympics and in the 1956 Summer Olympics.
