= Lucien De Muynck =

Belgian middle-distance runner

Personal information
- Nationality: Belgian
- Born: 1 August 1931
- Died: 24 October 1999 (aged 68)

Sport
- Sport: Middle-distance running
- Event: 800 metres
Medal record
Men's athletics
Representing Belgium
European Championships
| Silver medal – second place | 1954 Bern | 800 m |

Lucien De Muynck (1 August 1931 – 24 October 1999) was a Belgian middle-distance runner. He competed in the men's 800 metres at the 1952 Summer Olympics.
