= Jean-Paul Martin du Gard =

French sprinter

Medal record

Men's athletics

Representing France

European Championships
Gold medal – first place	1954 Bern	4×400 m

Jean-Paul Martin-du-Gard (3 May 1927 – 26 February 2017) was a French runner who competed in the 1952 Summer Olympics and in the 1956 Summer Olympics.
