= Lajos Szentgáli =

Hungarian middle-distance runner

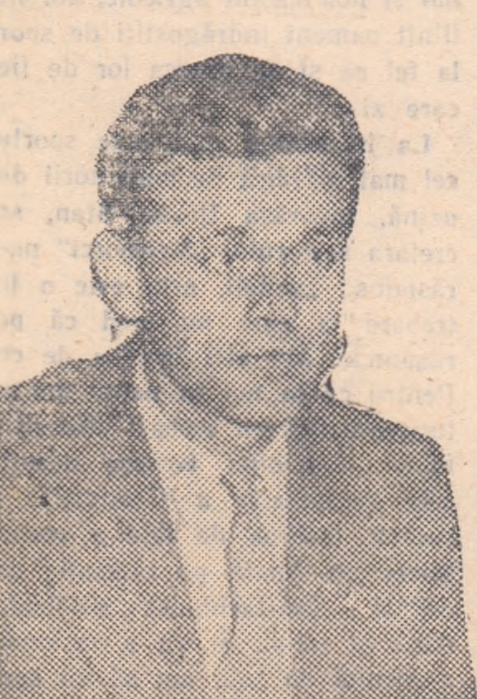
- The International Athletics Championships of the R.P.R. on the Republic Stadium. Lajos Szentgáli

Medal record

Men's athletics

Representing Hungary

European Championships
Gold medal – first place	1954 Bern	800 m

Lajos Szentgáli (7 June 1932 – 2 November 2005) was a Hungarian athlete who competed in the 1952 Summer Olympics and in the 1956 Summer Olympics. He was born and died in Budapest.
