= Karl-Friedrich Haas =

West German sprinter (1931–2021)

Medal record

Men's athletics

Representing Germany

Olympic Games
Bronze medal – third place	1952 Helsinki	4×400 m
Silver medal – second place	1956 Melbourne	400 m

Representing West Germany

European Championships
Silver medal – second place	1954 Bern	4×400 m
Silver medal – second place	1958 Stockholm	4×400 m
Bronze medal – third place	1958 Stockholm	400 m

Karl-Friedrich Haas (28 July 1931 – 12 August 2021) was a West German athlete who mainly competed in the 400 metres. He was born in Berlin, Brandenburg, Prussia, Germany. He competed for West Germany in the 1952 Summer Olympics held in Helsinki, Finland where he won the bronze medal in the 4 × 400 metre relay with his teammates Hans Geister, Günther Steines and Heinz Ulzheimer. Four years later he competed for the United Team of Germany in the 1956 Summer Olympics held in Melbourne, Australia and won a silver in the individual 400 metres. His son Christian Haas was also an Olympic competitor.
