= Hans Geister =

German sprinter

Personal information
- Born: September 28, 1928 Duisburg-Hamborn, Weimar Republic
- Died: May 16, 2012 (aged 83)
Medal record
Men's athletics
Representing Germany
Olympic Games
Bronze medal – third place	1952 Helsinki	4×400 m
European Championships
Silver medal – second place	1954 Bern	4×400 m

Hans Geister (September 28, 1928 – May 16, 2012) was a German track and field athlete, who mainly competed in the 400 metres. He was born in Duisburg-Hamborn.

He was German 400 meters champion in 1951. In the same year he was part of the CSV Marathon Krefeld club team that won the British championship 4 × 440 yard relay. He competed in the 4 × 400 metre relay for Germany at the 1952 Summer Olympics held in Helsinki, Finland, where he won the bronze medal with his teammates Günter Steines, Heinz Ulzheimer and Karl-Friedrich Haas. Im 1954 he was part of the German 4 × 400 meters relay team which won the silver medal in the European championships. Later on he served as an honorary club coach in Krefeld working, e.g., with Arnd Krüger.
