= Egon Solymossy =

Hungarian sprinter

Egon Solymossy (May 18, 1922 – September 24, 2009) was a Hungarian sprint athlete who competed in late 1940s and early 1950s. At the 1952 Summer Olympics in Helsinki, he was eliminated in the first round of both the 400 m and 4 × 400 m relay events. He was born in Miskolc.
