= Rolf Back =

Finnish sprinter

Personal information
- Nationality: Finnish
- Born: 13 May 1928
- Died: 6 August 2009 (aged 81)

Sport
- Sport: Sprinting
- Event: 400 metres
Medal record
Men's athletics
Representing Finland
European Championships
Bronze medal – third place	1954 Bern	4×400 m

Rolf Back (13 May 1928 – 6 August 2009) was a Finnish sprinter. He competed in the men's 400 metres at the 1952 Summer Olympics.
