= Roger Moens =

Belgian middle-distance runner

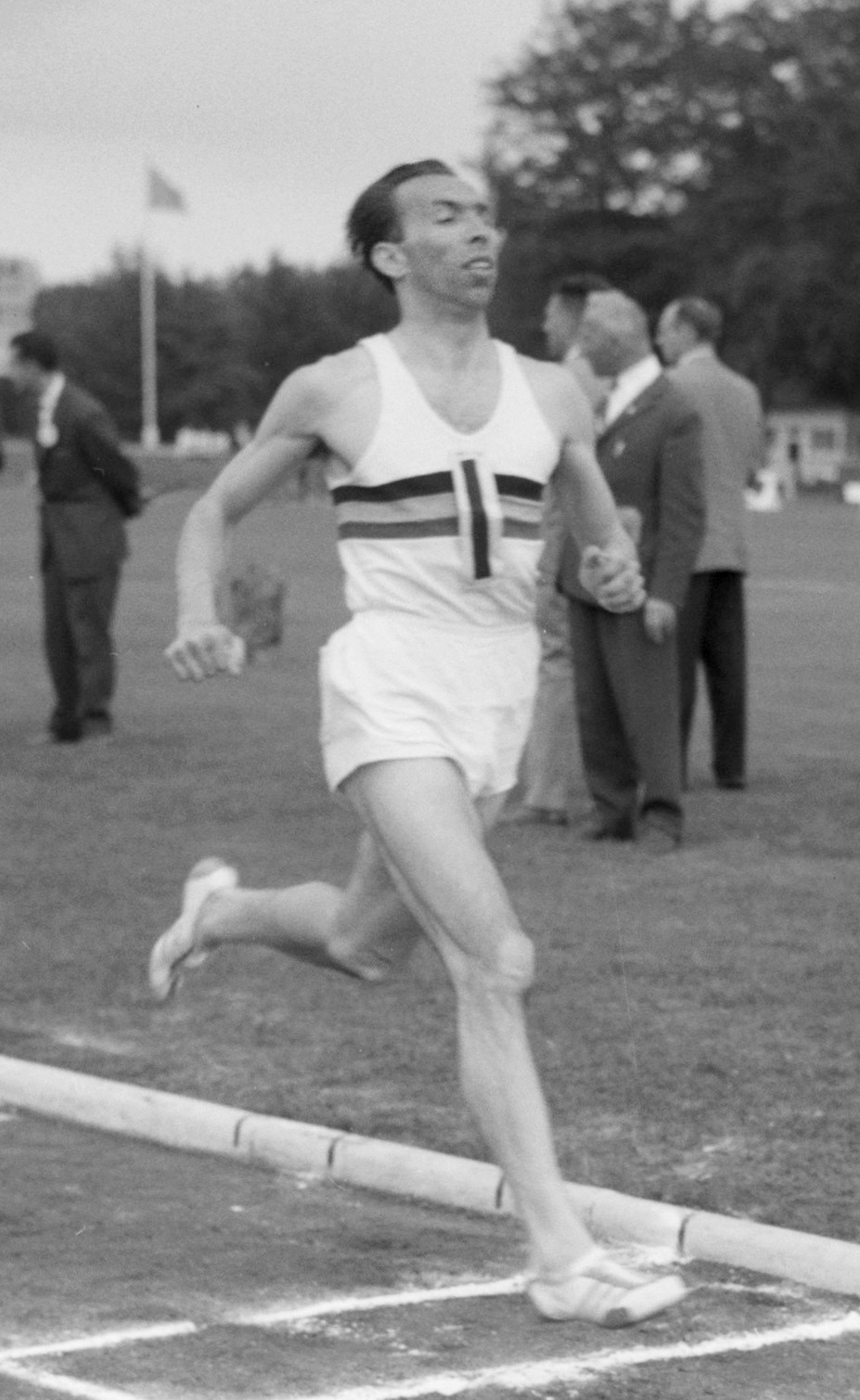
- Moens in 1961

Personal information
- Born: 26 April 1930 (age 96) Erembodegem, Belgium
- Height: 1.75 m (5 ft 9 in)
- Weight: 70 kg (154 lb)

Sport
- Sport: Athletics
- Events: 400 m, 800 m
- Club: RCB/VS

Achievements and titles
- Personal bests: 400 m – 47.3 (1955); 800 m – 1:45.7 (1955)
Medal record
Men's athletics
Representing Belgium
Olympic Games
Silver medal – second place	1960 Rome	800 m

Roger Moens (born 26 April 1930) is a Belgian former middle-distance runner. In 1955 he broke Rudolf Harbig's long-standing world record over 800 meters. At the 1960 Summer Olympics in Rome he won a silver medal in the 800 m.

== Biography ==
On 3 August 1955, in the Bislett Stadium in Oslo, Moens improved Rudolf Harbig's 16-year-old 800-meter world record of 1:46.6, running 1.45.7. He finished two-tenths of a second ahead of Norwegian Audun Boysen, who was also under the previous world record.

Moens' global record would stand for seven years, until it was improved in 1962 by New Zealander Peter Snell. As a Belgian record it stood for 20 years until broken in 1975 by Ivo Van Damme, who ran 1:45.31.

On 8 August 1956, Moens along with his teammates set a world record in the 4 × 800 meter relay with a time of 7.15.8. Yet he did not go to the Melbourne Olympic Games, which took place in November. In training at night on a tennis court, he ran into a pole, injured himself, and, as world record holder and Olympic favorite, was forced to withdraw from the Games.

At the Rome Olympic Games in 1960, Moens at the age of 30 felt confident about the 800 meters. Biding his time in the race, Moens followed the pack, waiting to unleash his final sprint in the straightaway. Coming off the final turn and into the straight, Moens moved strongly into the lead and appeared to have the race won but Snell, a complete unknown at the time, passed him on the left shortly before the finish tape. Snell won by inches in 1:46.3 to Moens' 1:46.5. Immediately after the finish Moens threw himself on the grass and stayed there with his head in his hands. Years later, when asked whether the final in Rome still haunted him, he said, "Ah, it makes no sense to look back."

After retiring from competitions Moens served as a sports commentator for VRT; he interviewed his former rival Snell at the 1964 Olympics in Tokyo. A criminology graduate he also worked for the Belgian judicial police, eventually becoming a commissioner general.

== Belgian championships ==
Event	Year
400 m	1952, 1953, 1954, 1955, 1956, 1957
800 m	1953, 1954, 1955, 1956, 1957, 1959, 1960, 1961

== Personal records ==
Event	Time	Date	Location
400 m	47.3	9 October 1955	Sofia
800 m	1:45.7 (WR)	3 August 1955	Oslo
1500 m	3:41.4	19 June 1960	Antwerp

Records
Preceded by (Germany) Rudolf Harbig	Men's 800 metres World Record Holder; 1955-08-03 – 1962-02-02	Succeeded by (New Zealand) Peter Snell
Preceded by (Germany) Rudolf Harbig	European Record Holder Men's 800m 3 August 1955 – 6 August 1966	Succeeded by (West Germany) Franz-Josef Kemper
