= Pierre Haarhoff =

French sprinter (1932–2024)

Personal information
- Nationality: French
- Born: 9 July 1932 Haguenau, France
- Died: 11 June 2024 (aged 91) Haguenau, France

Sport
- Sport: Athletics

Pierre Haarhoff (9 July 1932 – 11 June 2024) was a French athlete who competed in the 400 metres and the 4 × 400 metres relay at the 1956 Summer Olympics. Haarhoff died on 11 June 2024, at the age of 91.
