= 1954 European Athletics Championships =

5th European Athletics Championships
- Dates: 25 – 29 August
- Host city: Bern, Switzerland
- Venue: Stadion Neufeld
- Level: Senior
- Type: Outdoor
- Events: 35
- Participation: 686 athletes from 28 nations

The 5th European Athletics Championships were held at Stadion Neufeld from 25–29 August 1954 in the Swiss capital Bern. Contemporaneous reports on the event were given in the Glasgow Herald.

== Medal summary ==
Complete results were published.

=== Men ===
| Event | Gold | | Silver | | Bronze | |
|---|---|---|---|---|---|---|
| 100 metres | Heinz Fütterer (FRG) | 10.5 =CR | René Bonino (FRA) | 10.6 | George Ellis (GBR) | 10.7 |
| 200 metres | Heinz Fütterer (FRG) | 20.9 CR | Ardalion Ignatyev (URS) | 21.1 | George Ellis (GBR) | 21.2 |
| 400 metres | Ardalion Ignatyev (URS) | 46.6 CR | Voitto Hellstén (FIN) | 47.0 | Zoltán Adamik (HUN) | 47.6 |
| 800 metres | Lajos Szentgáli (HUN) | 1:47.1 CR | Lucien De Muynck (BEL) | 1:47.3 | Audun Boysen (NOR) | 1:47.4 |
| 1500 metres | Roger Bannister (GBR) | 3:43.8 CR | Gunnar Nielsen (DEN) | 3:44.4 | Stanislav Jungwirth (TCH) | 3:45.4 |
| 5000 metres | Vladimir Kuts (URS) | 13:56.6 CR | Chris Chataway (GBR) | 14:08.8 | Emil Zátopek (TCH) | 14:10.2 |
| 10,000 metres | Emil Zátopek (TCH) | 28:58.0 CR | József Kovács (HUN) | 29:25.8 | Frank Sando (GBR) | 29:27.6 |
| 110 metres hurdles | Yevgeniy Bulanchik (URS) | 14.4 | Jack Parker (GBR) | 14.6 | Berthold Steines (FRG) | 14.7 |
| 400 metres hurdles | Anatoliy Yulin (URS) | 50.5 CR | Yuriy Lituyev (URS) | 50.8 | Ossi Mildh (FIN) | 51.5 |
| 3000 metres steeplechase | Sándor Rozsnyói (HUN) | 8:49.6 CR | Olavi Rinteenpää (FIN) | 8:52.4 | Ernst Larsen (NOR) | 8:53.2 |
| 4 × 100 metres relay | Hungary; László Zarándi; Géza Varasdi; György Csányi; Béla Goldoványi | 40.6 CR | Great Britain; Kenneth Box; George Ellis; Ken Jones; Brian Shenton | 40.8 | Soviet Union; Boris Tokarev; Viktor Ryabov; Levan Sanadze; Leonid Bartenev | 40.9 |
| 4 × 400 metres relay | France; Claude Haarhoff; Jacques Degats; Jean-Paul Martin du Gard; Jean-Pierre Goudeau | 3:08.7 CR | West Germany; Hans Geister; Helmut Drehen; Heinz Ulzheimer; Karl-Friedrich Haas | 3:08.8 | Finland; Raimo Graeffe; Ossi Mildh; Rolf Back; Voitto Hellstén | 3:11.5 |
| 10,000 metres track walk | Josef Doležal (TCH) | 45:01.8 CR | Anatoliy Yegorov (URS) | 45:53.0 | Sergey Lobastov (URS) | 46:21.8 |
| 50 kilometres walk | Vladimir Ukhov (URS) | 4:22:11.2 CR | Josef Doležal (TCH) | 4:25:07.4 | Antal Róka (HUN) | 4:31:32.2 |
| Marathon | Veikko Karvonen (FIN) | 2:24:51.6 CR | Boris Grishayev (URS) | 2:24:55.8 | Ivan Filin (URS) | 2:25:26.6 |
| High jump | Bengt Nilsson (SWE) | 2.02 m CR | Jiří Lanský (TCH) | 1.98 m | Jaroslav Kovář (TCH) | 1.96 m |
| Pole vault | Eeles Landström (FIN) | 4.40 m CR | Ragnar Lundberg (SWE) | 4.40 m CR | Jeff Elliott (GBR) | 4.30 m |
| Pole vault | Eeles Landström (FIN) | 4.40 m CR | Ragnar Lundberg (SWE) | 4.40 m CR | Jukka Piironen (FIN) | 4.30 m |
| Long jump | Ödön Földessy (HUN) | 7.51 m | Zbigniew Iwański (POL) | 7.46 m | Ernest Wanko (FRA) | 7.41 m |
| Triple jump | Leonid Shcherbakov (URS) | 15.90 m CR | Roger Norman (SWE) | 15.17 m | Martin Řehák (TCH) | 15.10 m |
| Shot put | Jiří Skobla (TCH) | 17.20 m CR | Oto Grigalka (URS) | 16.69 m | Heino Heinaste (URS) | 16.27 m |
| Discus throw | Adolfo Consolini (ITA) | 53.44 m | Giuseppe Tosi (ITA) | 53.34 m | József Szécsényi (HUN) | 51.58 m |
| Javelin throw | Janusz Sidło (POL) | 76.35 m | Vladimir Kuznetsov (URS) | 74.61 m | Soini Nikkinen (FIN) | 73.38 m |
| Hammer throw | Mikhail Krivonosov (URS) | 63.34 m CR | Sverre Strandli (NOR) | 61.07 m | József Csermák (HUN) | 59.72 m |
| Decathlon | Vasili Kuznetsov (URS) | 6752 pts | Torbjörn Lassenius (FIN) | 6424 pts | Heinz Oberbeck (FRG) | 6263 pts |

=== Women ===
| Event | Gold | | Silver | | Bronze | |
|---|---|---|---|---|---|---|
| 100 metres | Irina Turova (URS) | 11.8 | Bertha van Duyne (NED) | 11.9 | Anne Pashley (GBR) | 11.9 |
| 200 metres | Mariya Itkina (URS) | 24.3 | Irina Turova (URS) | 24.4 | Shirley Hampton (GBR) | 24.4 |
| 800 metres | Nina Otkalenko (URS) | 2:08.8 CR | Diane Leather (GBR) | 2:09.8 | Lyudmila Lysenko (URS) | 2:11.2 |
| 80 metres hurdles | Maria Golubnichaya (URS) | 11.0 CR | Anneliese Seonbuchner (FRG) | 11.2 | Pam Seaborne (GBR) | 11.3 |
| 4 × 100 metres relay | Soviet Union; Vera Krepkina; Rimma Uliskina; Maria Itkina; Irina Turova | 45.8 CR | West Germany; Irmgard Egert; Charlotte Bohmer; Irene Brutting; Maria Sander | 46.3 | Italy; Maria Musso; Giuseppina Leone; Letizia Bertoni; Milena Greppi | 46.6 |
| High jump | Thelma Hopkins (GBR) | 1.67 m CR | Iolanda Balaş (ROU) | 1.65 m | Olga Modrachová (TCH) | 1.63 m |
| Long jump | Jean Desforges (GBR) | 6.04 m CR | Aleksandra Chudina (URS) | 5.93 m | Elżbieta Duńska (POL) | 5.83 m |
| Shot put | Galina Zybina (URS) | 15.65 m CR | Maria Kuznetsova (URS) | 14.99 m | Tamara Tyshkevich (URS) | 14.78 m |
| Discus throw | Nina Ponomaryeva (URS) | 48.02 m | Irina Beglyakova (URS) | 45.79 m | Galina Zybina (URS) | 44.77 m |
| Javelin throw | Dana Zátopková (TCH) | 52.91 m CR | Virve Roolaid (URS) | 49.94 m | Nadezhda Konyayeva (URS) | 49.49 m |
| Pentathlon | Aleksandra Chudina (URS) | 4526 pts CR | Maria Sander (FRG) | 4485 pts | Maria Sturm (FRG) | 4357 pts |

== Medal table ==
| Rank | Nation | Gold | Silver | Bronze | Total |
|---|---|---|---|---|---|
| 1 | Soviet Union (URS) | 16 | 11 | 8 | 35 |
| 2 | Czechoslovakia (TCH) | 4 | 2 | 5 | 11 |
| 3 | Hungary (HUN) | 4 | 1 | 4 | 9 |
| 4 | Great Britain (GBR) | 3 | 4 | 7 | 14 |
| 5 | West Germany (FRG) | 2 | 4 | 3 | 9 |
| 6 | Finland (FIN) | 2 | 3 | 4 | 9 |
| 7 | Sweden (SWE) | 1 | 2 | 0 | 3 |
| 8 | France (FRA) | 1 | 1 | 1 | 3 |
| 8 | Italy (ITA) | 1 | 1 | 1 | 3 |
| 8 | Poland (POL) | 1 | 1 | 1 | 3 |
| 11 | Norway (NOR) | 0 | 1 | 2 | 3 |
| 12 | Belgium (BEL) | 0 | 1 | 0 | 1 |
| 12 | Denmark (DEN) | 0 | 1 | 0 | 1 |
| 12 | Netherlands (NED) | 0 | 1 | 0 | 1 |
| 12 | Romania (ROM) | 0 | 1 | 0 | 1 |
| Totals (15 entries) | | 35 | 35 | 36 | 106 |

== Participation ==
According to an unofficial count, 689 athletes from 28 countries participated in the event, three athletes more than the official number of 686 as published.

- Austria (25)
- Belgium (29)
- Bulgaria (9)
- Czechoslovakia (42)
- Denmark (7)
- Finland (31)
- France (49)
- Great Britain (46)
- Greece (7)
- Hungary (41)
- Iceland (7)
- Ireland (3)
- Italy (24)
- Liechtenstein (4)
- Luxembourg (2)
- Netherlands (12)
- Norway (13)
- Poland (35)
- Portugal (9)
- Romania (24)
- Saar (9)
- Soviet Union (68)
- Spain (4)
- Sweden (37)
- Switzerland (50)
- Turkey (16)
- West Germany (62)
- Yugoslavia (24)
