= Athletics at the 1960 Summer Olympics – Men's 4 × 400 metres relay =

Men's 4 × 400 metres relay at the Games of the XVII Olympiad
- Venue: Olympic Stadium
- Dates: September 7, 1960 (heats and semifinals); September 8, 1960 (final)

Medalists
1st place, gold medalist(s)		Jack Yerman; Earl Young; Glenn Davis; Otis Davis; United States
2nd place, silver medalist(s)		Joachim Reske; Manfred Kinder; Jo Kaiser; Carl Kaufmann; United Team of Germany
3rd place, bronze medalist(s)		Malcolm Spence; Jim Wedderburn; Keith Gardner; George Kerr; British West Indies

The men's 4 × 400 metres relay event at the 1960 Olympic Games took place on 7 and 8 September.

== Results ==
=== Heats ===
The fastest three teams in each of the four heats advanced to the semifinal round.

Heat one

Rank	Name	Nationality	Time	Notes
1	Joachim Reske; Manfred Kinder; Jo Kaiser; Carl Kaufmann	United Team of Germany	3:10.58	
2	Ergas Leps; Joe Mullins; Sig Ohlemann; Terry Tobacco	Canada	3:10.65	
3	Srđan Savić; Ðani Kovač; Miloje Grujić; Viktor Šnajder	Yugoslavia	3:10.75	
4	Pentti Rekola; Börje Strand; Voitto Hellstén; Jussi Rintamäki	Finland	3:11.90	
5	Ovidio de Jesús; José Luis Villalongo; Ramón Vega; German Guenard	Puerto Rico	3:13.91	

Heat two

Rank	Name	Nationality	Time	Notes
1	Malcolm Spence; Jim Wedderburn; Keith Gardner; George Kerr	British West Indies	3:09.28	
2	Edward Bożek; Stanisław Swatowski; Bogusław Gierajewski; Jerzy Kowalski	Poland	3:09.67	
3	Giuseppe Bommarito; Mario Fraschini; Nereo Fossati; Renato Panciera	Italy	3:10.00	
4	Marcel Lambrechts; Jos Lambrechts; Lodewijk De Clerck; Roger Moens	Belgium	3:15.26	
5	Roger Bofferding; Felix Heuertz; Norbert Haupert; Ramon Humbert	Luxembourg	3:21.87	

Heat three

Rank	Name	Nationality	Time	Notes
1	René Weber; Ernst Zaugg; Hansruedi Bruder; Christian Wägli	Switzerland	3:10.79	
2	Edward Jefferys; Edgar Davis; Gordon Day; Malcolm Spence	South Africa	3:16.32	
3	Malcolm Yardley; Barry Jackson; John Wrighton; Robbie Brightwell	Great Britain	3:20.47	
-	Leonidas Kormalis; Konstantinos Moragiemos; Evangelos Depastas; Vasilios Sillis	Greece		DNF

Heat four

Rank	Name	Nationality	Time	Notes
1	Jack Yerman; Earl Young; Glenn Davis; Otis Davis	United States	3:10.58	
2	William Quaye; James Addy; Frederick Owusu; John Asare-Antwi	Ghana	3:10.66	
3	Hans-Olof Johansson; Per-Owe Trollsås; Lennart Jonsson; Alf Petersson	Sweden	3:10.91	
4	Zdeněk Váňa; Jaromír Šlégr; Jaroslav Jirásek; Josef Trousil	Czechoslovakia	3:11.33	
5	Konstantin Grachev; Boris Kriunov; Vladimir Polyanichev; Arnold Matsulevych	Soviet Union	3:12.31	

=== Semifinals ===
The fastest three runners in each of the two heats advanced to the final round.

Heat one

Rank	Name	Nationality	Time	Notes
1	Edward Jefferys; Edgar Davis; Gordon Day; Malcolm Spence	South Africa	3:06.53	
2	Joachim Reske; Manfred Kinder; Jo Kaiser; Carl Kaufmann	United Team of Germany	3:07.60	
3	Malcolm Yardley; Barry Jackson; John Wrighton; Robbie Brightwell	Great Britain	3:07.67	
4	Giuseppe Bommarito; Mario Fraschini; Nereo Fossati; Renato Panciera	Italy	3:07.83	
5	Ergas Leps; Joe Mullins; Sig Ohlemann; Terry Tobacco	Canada	3:08.37	
6	Srđan Savić; Ðani Kovač; Miloje Grujić; Viktor Šnajder	Yugoslavia	3:10.34	

Heat two

Rank	Name	Nationality	Time	Notes
1	Jack Yerman; Earl Young; Glenn Davis; Otis Davis	United States	3:08.57	
2	Malcolm Spence; Jim Wedderburn; Keith Gardner; George Kerr	British West Indies	3:09.34	
3	René Weber; Ernst Zaugg; Hansruedi Bruder; Christian Wägli	Switzerland	3:09.77	
4	Edward Bożek; Stanisław Swatowski; Bogusław Gierajewski; Jerzy Kowalski	Poland	3:10.88	
5	William Quaye; James Addy; Frederick Owusu; John Asare-Antwi	Ghana	3:11.03	
6	Hans-Olof Johansson; Per-Owe Trollsås; Lennart Jonsson; Alf Petersson	Sweden	3:11.05	

=== Final ===
Rank	Name	Nationality	Time	Notes
1st place, gold medalist(s)	Jack Yerman; Earl Young; Glenn Davis; Otis Davis	United States	3:02.37	WR
2nd place, silver medalist(s)	Joachim Reske; Manfred Kinder; Jo Kaiser; Carl Kaufmann	United Team of Germany	3:02.84	
3rd place, bronze medalist(s)	Malcolm Spence; Jim Wedderburn; Keith Gardner; George Kerr	British West Indies	3:04.13	
4	Edward Jefferys; Edgar Davis; Gordon Day; Malcolm Spence	South Africa	3:05.18	
5	Malcolm Yardley; Barry Jackson; John Wrighton; Robbie Brightwell	Great Britain	3:08.47	
6	René Weber; Ernst Zaugg; Hansruedi Bruder; Christian Wägli	Switzerland	3:09.55	

Key: WR = world record; DNF = did not finish
