= 1958 European Athletics Championships – Men's 400 metres =

Men's 400 metres at the European Athletics Championships

The men's 400 metres at the 1958 European Athletics Championships was held in Stockholm, Sweden, at Stockholms Olympiastadion on 19, 20, and 21 August 1958.

== Medalists ==
Gold	John Wrighton; Great Britain
Silver	John Salisbury; Great Britain
Bronze	Karl-Friedrich Haas; West Germany

== Results ==
=== Final ===
21 August

Rank	Name	Nationality	Time	Notes
1st place, gold medalist(s)	John Wrighton	Great Britain	46.3	CR NR
2nd place, silver medalist(s)	John Salisbury	Great Britain	46.5	
3rd place, bronze medalist(s)	Karl-Friedrich Haas	West Germany	47.0	
4	Carl Kaufmann	West Germany	47.0	
5	Alf Petersson	Sweden	47.5	
6	Stanisław Swatowski	Poland	47.8	

=== Semi-finals ===
20 August

==== Semi-final 1 ====
Rank	Name	Nationality	Time	Notes
1	John Wrighton	Great Britain	46.9	Q
2	Karl-Friedrich Haas	West Germany	47.5	Q
3	Bernard Dibonda	France	48.0	
4	Csaba Csutorás	Hungary	48.0	
5	Pentti Rekola	Finland	48.1	
6	Gerard Mach	Poland	48.5	

==== Semi-final 2 ====
Rank	Name	Nationality	Time	Notes
1	John Salisbury	Great Britain	46.8	Q
2	Carl Kaufmann	West Germany	47.2	Q
3	Voitto Hellstén	Finland	47.2	
4	Bruno Urben	Switzerland	47.5	
5	Lennart Jonsson	Sweden	47.7	
6	Valentin Rakhmanov	Soviet Union	48.5	

==== Semi-final 3 ====
Rank	Name	Nationality	Time	Notes
1	Stanisław Swatowski	Poland	47.1	Q
2	Alf Petersson	Sweden	47.4	NR Q
3	René Weber	Switzerland	47.4	
4	Viktor Šnajder	Yugoslavia	47.5	NR
5	Traian Sudrigean	Romania	48.0	
6	Mikhail Nikolskiy	Soviet Union	48.1	

=== Heats ===
19 August

==== Heat 1 ====
Rank	Name	Nationality	Time	Notes
1	John Salisbury	Great Britain	47.8	Q
2	Csaba Csutorás	Hungary	47.9	Q
3	René Weber	Switzerland	48.2	Q
4	Renato Panciera	Italy	49.0	

==== Heat 2 ====
Rank	Name	Nationality	Time	Notes
1	Carl Kaufmann	West Germany	48.0	Q
2	Gerard Mach	Poland	48.3	Q
3	Traian Sudrigean	Romania	48.8	Q
4	Mario Fraschini	Italy	49.0	

==== Heat 3 ====
Rank	Name	Nationality	Time	Notes
1	Lennart Jonsson	Sweden	48.3	Q
2	Mikhail Nikolskiy	Soviet Union	48.3	Q
3	Stanisław Swatowski	Poland	48.4	Q
4	Louis De Clerck	Belgium	48.9	

==== Heat 4 ====
Rank	Name	Nationality	Time	Notes
1	Alf Petersson	Sweden	47.8	Q
2	Viktor Šnajder	Yugoslavia	47.9	Q
3	John Wrighton	Great Britain	47.9	Q
4	Michael Gialanze	Malta	53.4	

==== Heat 5 ====
Rank	Name	Nationality	Time	Notes
1	Karl-Friedrich Haas	West Germany	48.2	Q
2	Bruno Urben	Switzerland	48.4	Q
3	Pentti Rekola	Finland	48.4	Q
4	Jaroslav Jirásek	Czechoslovakia	48.6	
5	Richard Stiger	Austria	49.0	

==== Heat 6 ====
Rank	Name	Nationality	Time	Notes
1	Valentin Rakhmanov	Soviet Union	48.1	Q
2	Bernard Dibonda	France	48.7	Q
3	Voitto Hellstén	Finland	48.9	Q
4	Vasilios Syllis	Greece	49.2	
5	Fahir Özgüden	Turkey	49.8	

== Participation ==
According to an unofficial count, 26 athletes from 18 countries participated in the event.

- Austria (1)
- Belgium (1)
- Czechoslovakia (1)
- Finland (2)
- France (1)
- Greece (1)
- Hungary (1)
- Italy (2)
- Malta (1)
- Poland (2)
- Romania (1)
- Soviet Union (2)
- Sweden (2)
- Switzerland (2)
- Turkey (1)
- Great Britain (2)
- West Germany (2)
- Yugoslavia (1)
