= 1958 European Athletics Championships – Men's 4 × 400 metres relay =

Men's 4 × 400 metres relay at the European Athletics Championships

The men's 4 × 400 metres relay at the 1958 European Athletics Championships was held in Stockholm, Sweden, at Stockholms Olympiastadion on 23 and 24 August 1958.

== Medalists ==
Gold	Ted Sampson; John MacIsaac; John Wrighton; John Salisbury; Great Britain
Silver	Carl Kaufmann; Manfred Poerschke; Johannes Kaiser; Karl-Friedrich Haas; West Germany
Bronze	Nils Holmberg; Hans Lindgren; Lennart Jonsson; Alf Petersson; Sweden

== Results ==
=== Final ===
24 August

Rank	Nation	Competitors	Time	Notes
1st place, gold medalist(s)	Great Britain	Ted Sampson; John MacIsaac; John Wrighton; John Salisbury	3:07.9	CR
2nd place, silver medalist(s)	West Germany	Carl Kaufmann; Manfred Poerschke; Johannes Kaiser; Karl-Friedrich Haas	3:08.2	
3rd place, bronze medalist(s)	Sweden	Nils Holmberg; Hans Lindgren; Lennart Jonsson; Alf Petersson	3:10.7	NR
4	Italy	Nereo Fossati; Mario Fraschini; Giovanni Scavo; Renato Panciera	3:11.1	
5	Soviet Union	Konstantin Grachov; Abram Krivosheyev; Mikhail Nikolskiy; Valentin Rakhmanov	3:11.4	
6	Poland	Stanisław Swatowski; Jacek Jakubowski; Tadeusz Kaźmierski; Zbigniew Makomaski	3:13.8	

=== Heats ===
23 August

==== Heat 1 ====
Rank	Nation	Competitors	Time	Notes
1	West Germany	Carl Kaufmann; Manfred Poerschke; Johannes Kaiser; Karl-Friedrich Haas	3:12.5	Q
2	Soviet Union	Konstantin Grachov; Abram Krivosheyev; Mikhail Nikolskiy; Valentin Rakhmanov	3:13.2	Q
3	Italy	Nereo Fossati; Mario Fraschini; Giovanni Scavo; Renato Panciera	3:13.3	Q
4	Finland	Börje Strand; Pentti Rekola; Jussi Rintamäki; Voitto Hellstén	3:13.4	

==== Heat 2 ====
Rank	Nation	Competitors	Time	Notes
1	Great Britain	Ted Sampson; John MacIsaac; John Wrighton; John Salisbury	3:13.4	Q
2	Sweden	Nils Holmberg; Hans Lindgren; Lennart Jonsson; Alf Petersson	3:14.6	Q
3	Poland	Stanisław Swatowski; Jacek Jakubowski; Tadeusz Kaźmierski; Zbigniew Makomaski	3:14.9	Q
4	Switzerland	Bruno Urben; Bruno Galliker; Christian Wägli; René Weber	3:15.3	

== Participation ==
According to an unofficial count, 32 athletes from 8 countries participated in the event.

- Finland (4)
- Italy (4)
- Poland (4)
- Soviet Union (4)
- Sweden (4)
- Switzerland (4)
- Great Britain (4)
- West Germany (4)
