= Athletics at the 1960 Summer Olympics – Men's 400 metres =

Men's 400 metres at the Games of the XVII Olympiad
- Venue: Olympic Stadium
- Dates: 3–6 September 1960
- Competitors: 59 from 44 nations
- Winning time: 44.9 WR

Medalists
1st place, gold medalist(s)		Otis Davis	United States
2nd place, silver medalist(s)		Carl Kaufmann	United Team of Germany
3rd place, bronze medalist(s)		Malcolm Spence	South Africa

Official Video Highlights

The men's 400 metres was an event at the 1960 Summer Olympics in Rome. The competition was held between September 3 and September 6, 1960. 59 competitors from 44 nations entered, but 54 competitors from 41 nations participated. The maximum number of athletes per nation had been set at 3 since the 1930 Olympic Congress. The event was won by 0.01 seconds by Otis Davis of the United States, the second consecutive and ninth overall title in the event for an American. Carl Kaufmann's silver was the second straight silver for a German in the event, while Malcolm Spence's bronze was the first medal for South Africa in the 400 metres since 1920.

== Summary ==
This race was settled via photo finish using one of the first experimental attempts at fully automatic timing. Carl Kaufmann made a diving lunge at the finish line, his head crossing the line first. But it is the torso that counts and Otis Davis, running upright had his body ahead of Kaufmann. After a suspenseful pause, Davis was ruled the winner. The photo was made further famous after being published in Life Magazine. In fourth place, Milkha Singh ran the Indian national record that lasted 44 years until the 2004 Olympics.

There is potential confusion with two athletes in the competition named Malcolm Spence, both qualifying to the second semifinal. The (one year) younger Malcolm Spence representing South Africa eventually netted the bronze medal, while the senior Malcolm Spence from Jamaica, shortened his name to "Mal" while representing the British West Indies, achieved a bronze as part of their 4x400 metres relay, one second ahead of the 4th place South African team.

In the final, South African Malcolm Spence took off hard from the gun, making up the stagger and passing Milkha Singh to his outside before the second turn. Through the second turn, Otis Davis gained ground strongly, passing Spence to his outside halfway through the turn, emerging onto the home straight with the lead, two lanes inside of him Carl Kaufmann also gained on the turn and emerged slightly ahead of Spence. Kaufmann gained steadily on Davis but never caught him, desperately diving at the finish line from a half meter back but unable to get more than his head ahead of Davis. Singh was the best of the rest, holding his own the second half of the race against the initial lead of Spence, but unable to gain much ground. Ultimately Spence held on for bronze.

== Background ==
This was the fourteenth appearance of the event, which is one of 12 athletics events to have been held at every Summer Olympics. Of the finalists from 1956, bronze medalist Voitto Hellstén of Finland and sixth-place finisher Malcolm Spence returned in 1960. The field was relatively open, with no clear favorite.

Afghanistan, the Bahamas, the British West Indies, Ghana, Guyana, Tunisia, and Uganda appeared in this event for the first time. The United States made its fourteenth appearance in the event, the only nation to compete in it at every Olympic Games to that point.

== Competition format ==
The competition retained the basic four-round format from 1920. There were 9 heats in the first round, each scheduled to have 6 or 7 athletes but with some dropping to as low as 4 after withdrawals. The top three runners in each heat advanced to the quarterfinals. There were 4 quarterfinals of 6 or 7 runners each; the top three athletes in each quarterfinal heat advanced to the semifinals. The semifinals featured 2 heats of 6 runners each. The top three runners in each semifinal heat advanced, making a six-man final.

== Records ==
Prior to the competition, the existing World and Olympic records were as follows.

World record	Lou Jones (USA)	45.2	Los Angeles, United States	30 June 1956
Olympic record	George Rhoden (JAM)	45.9	Helsinki, Finland	25 July 1952

Otis Davis matched the Olympic record of 45.9 seconds in the quarterfinals. In the first semifinal, he set a new Olympic record at 45.5 seconds; by the end of the semifinals, four men had matched (Milkha Singh) or beaten (Malcolm Spence at 45.8 seconds, Carl Kaufmann at 45.7 seconds, and Otis at 45.5 seconds) the old record. In the final, the fifth- and sixth-place finishers (Manfred Kinder and Earl Young matched the old record—but still finished a full second behind the leaders, as Otis and Kaufmann broke the world record with 44.9 second finishes to take gold and silver. Singh's 45.6 seconds in the final set a national record that stood for 44 years.

== Schedule ==
The semifinals and final were on different days for the first time since 1912.

All times are Central European Time (UTC+1)

Date	Time	Round
Saturday, 3 September 1960	09:50; 16:10	Round 1 Quarterfinals
Monday, 5 September 1960	16:15	Semifinals
Tuesday, 6 September 1960	15:45	Finals

== Results ==
=== First round ===
The top three runners in each of the 9 heats advanced.

==== Heat 1 ====
Rank	Athlete	Nation	Time (hand)	Time (auto)	Notes
1	Manfred Kinder	United Team of Germany	46.7	46.84	Q
2	Edgar Davis	South Africa	47.2	47.31	Q
3	Malcolm Yardley	Great Britain	47.3	47.38	Q
4	Josef Trousil	Czechoslovakia	47.4	47.53	
5	John Asare-Antwi	Ghana	47.7	47.81	
6	Kimitada Hayase	Japan	49.1	49.13	
7	Habib Sayed	Afghanistan	53.8	53.91	

==== Heat 2 ====
Rank	Athlete	Nation	Time (hand)	Time (auto)	Notes
1	Alf Pettersson	Sweden	48.3	48.44	Q
2	Robbie Brightwell	Great Britain	48.4	48.58	Q
3	Konstantin Grachev	Soviet Union	49.3	49.44	Q
4	Felix Heuertz	Luxembourg	50.2	50.34	
—	George Kerr	British West Indies	DNS		
—	Rafael Romero	Venezuela	DNS		

==== Heat 3 ====
Rank	Athlete	Nation	Time (hand)	Time (auto)	Notes
1	Carl Kaufmann	United Team of Germany	47.3	47.42	Q
2	Barry Robinson	New Zealand	47.6	47.70	Q
3	Lodewijk De Clerck	Belgium	47.9	48.00	Q
4	Anubes da Silva	Brazil	48.0	48.10	
5	Csaba Csutorás	Hungary	48.2	48.31	
6	Hugh Bullard	Bahamas	51.1	51.20	

==== Heat 4 ====
Rank	Athlete	Nation	Time (hand)	Time (auto)	Notes
1	Malcolm Spence	South Africa	46.7	46.79	Q
2	Kevan Gosper	Australia	47.1	47.20	Q
3	Terry Tobacco	Canada	47.4	48.52	Q
4	Gadi Ado	Uganda	49.0	49.12	
5	Marcel Lambrechts	Belgium	49.5	49.66	
6	Jorge Terán	Mexico	49.6	49.75	
7	Brahim Karabi	Tunisia	52.0	52.12	

==== Heat 5 ====
Rank	Athlete	Nation	Time (hand)	Time (auto)	Notes
1	German Guenard	Puerto Rico	47.3	47.39	Q
2	Jerzy Kowalski	Poland	48.3	48.49	Q
3	Giuseppe Bommarito	Italy	48.6	48.79	Q
4	Li Po-ting	Formosa	49.5	49.69	
5	Clayton Glasgow	Guyana	50.7	50.84	
6	George Johnson	Liberia	51.4	51.54	

==== Heat 6 ====
Rank	Athlete	Nation	Time (hand)	Time (auto)	Notes
1	Jack Yerman	United States	47.2	47.37	Q
2	Milkha Singh	India	47.6	47.72	Q
3	Stanislaw Swatowski	Poland	48.1	48.23	Q
4	Manikavasagam Jegathesan	Malaya	48.4	48.56	
5	Iván Rodríguez	Puerto Rico	49.6	49.74	
6	Claro Pellosis	Philippines	51.4	51.51	

==== Heat 7 ====
Rank	Athlete	Nation	Time (hand)	Time (auto)	Notes
1	Mal Spence	British West Indies	47.6	47.77	Q
2	Earl Young	United States	47.6	47.79	Q
3	Bartonjo Rotich	Kenya	47.7	47.89	Q
4	Zdenek Vána	Czechoslovakia	48.3	48.48	
5	Vasilios Sillis	Greece	48.4	48.56	
6	Manum Bumroongpruck	Thailand	49.6	49.85	

==== Heat 8 ====
Rank	Athlete	Nation	Time (hand)	Time (auto)	Notes
1	Abdul Karim Amu	Nigeria	46.8	46.93	Q
2	Gordon Day	South Africa	47.1	47.22	Q
3	Hans-Joachim Reske	United Team of Germany	47.2	47.38	Q
4	Voitto Hellstén	Finland	48.4	48.52	
5	Jassim Karim Kuraishi	Iraq	49.2	49.35	
6	Fahir Özgüden	Turkey	50.7	50.87	

==== Heat 9 ====
Rank	Athlete	Nation	Time (hand)	Time (auto)	Notes
1	Otis Davis	United States	46.8	46.91	Q
2	Jim Wedderburn	British West Indies	47.4	47.56	Q
3	John Wrighton	Great Britain	47.4	47.60	Q
4	René Weber	Switzerland	47.6	47.73	
5	Moussa Said	Ethiopia	48.2	48.30	
6	Amos Grodzinowsky	Israel	48.9	49.03	

=== Quarterfinal round ===
The top three in each of the 4 heats advanced.

==== Quarterfinal 1 ====
Rank	Athlete	Nation	Time (hand)	Time (auto)	Notes
1	Carl Kaufmann	United Team of Germany	46.5	46.67	Q
2	Milkha Singh	India	46.5	46.71	Q
3	Malcolm Spence	British West Indies	46.9	47.00	Q
4	Terry Tobacco	Canada	47.5	47.61	
5	Edgar Davis	South Africa	48.0	48.18	
6	Malcolm Yardley	Great Britain	48.8	48.93	
—	Alf Pettersson	Sweden	DNS		

==== Quarterfinal 2 ====
Rank	Athlete	Nation	Time (hand)	Time (auto)	Notes
1	Jack Yerman	United States	46.4	46.54	Q
2	Kevan Gosper	Australia	46.5	46.64	Q
3	Manfred Kinder	United Team of Germany	46.7	46.82	Q
4	Jim Wedderburn	British West Indies	47.0	47.22	
5	German Guenard	Puerto Rico	47.2	47.39	
6	John Wrighton	Great Britain	48.4	48.09	

==== Quarterfinal 3 ====
Rank	Athlete	Nation	Time (hand)	Time (auto)	Notes
1	Earl Young	United States	46.1	46.25	Q
2	Robbie Brightwell	Great Britain	46.2	46.31	Q
3	Gordon Day	South Africa	46.3	46.47	Q
4	Hans-Joachim Reske	United Team of Germany	47.3	47.43	
5	Stanisław Swatowski	Poland	47.4	47.56	
6	Konstantin Grachov	Soviet Union	47.6	47.78	
7	Bartonjo Rotich	Kenya	47.8	47.97	

==== Quarterfinal 4 ====
Rank	Athlete	Nation	Time (hand)	Time (auto)	Notes
1	Otis Davis	United States	45.9	46.02	Q, =OR
2	Malcolm Spence	South Africa	46.1	46.21	Q
3	Abdel Karim Amu	Nigeria	46.6	46.76	Q
4	Jerzy Kowalski	Poland	46.7	46.82	
5	Giuseppe Bommarito	Italy	47.5	47.71	
6	Barry Robinson	New Zealand	48.3	48.44	
7	Lodewijk De Clerck	Belgium	48.4	48.51	

=== Semifinal round ===
The top three in each of the 4 heats advanced.

==== Semifinal 1 ====
Rank	Athlete	Nation	Time (hand)	Time (auto)	Notes
1	Otis Davis	United States	45.5	45.62	Q
2	Milkha Singh	India	45.9	46.08	Q
3	Manfred Kinder	United Team of Germany	46.0	46.13	Q
4	Robbie Brightwell	Great Britain	46.1	46.25	
5	Gordon Day	South Africa	46.7	46.84	
6	Kevan Gosper	Australia	47.1	47.28	

==== Semifinal 2 ====
Rank	Athlete	Nation	Time (hand)	Time (auto)	Notes
1	Carl Kaufmann	United Team of Germany	45.7	45.88	Q
2	Malcolm Spence	South Africa	45.8	46.01	Q
3	Earl Young	United States	46.1	46.29	Q
4	Abdul Karim Amu	Nigeria	46.6	46.74	
5	Mal Spence	British West Indies	46.8	46.99	
6	Jack Yerman	United States	48.9	48.96	

=== Final ===
Rank	Lane	Athlete	Nation	Time (hand)	Time (auto)	Notes
1st place, gold medalist(s)	3	Otis Davis	United States	44.9	45.07	WR
2nd place, silver medalist(s)	1	Carl Kaufmann	United Team of Germany	44.9	45.08	WR
3rd place, bronze medalist(s)	4	Malcolm Spence	South Africa	45.5	45.60	
4	5	Milkha Singh	India	45.6	45.73	NR
5	6	Manfred Kinder	United Team of Germany	45.9	46.04	
6	2	Earl Young	United States	45.9	46.07	
