= ISTAF Berlin =

Athletics tournament held in Berlin, Germany

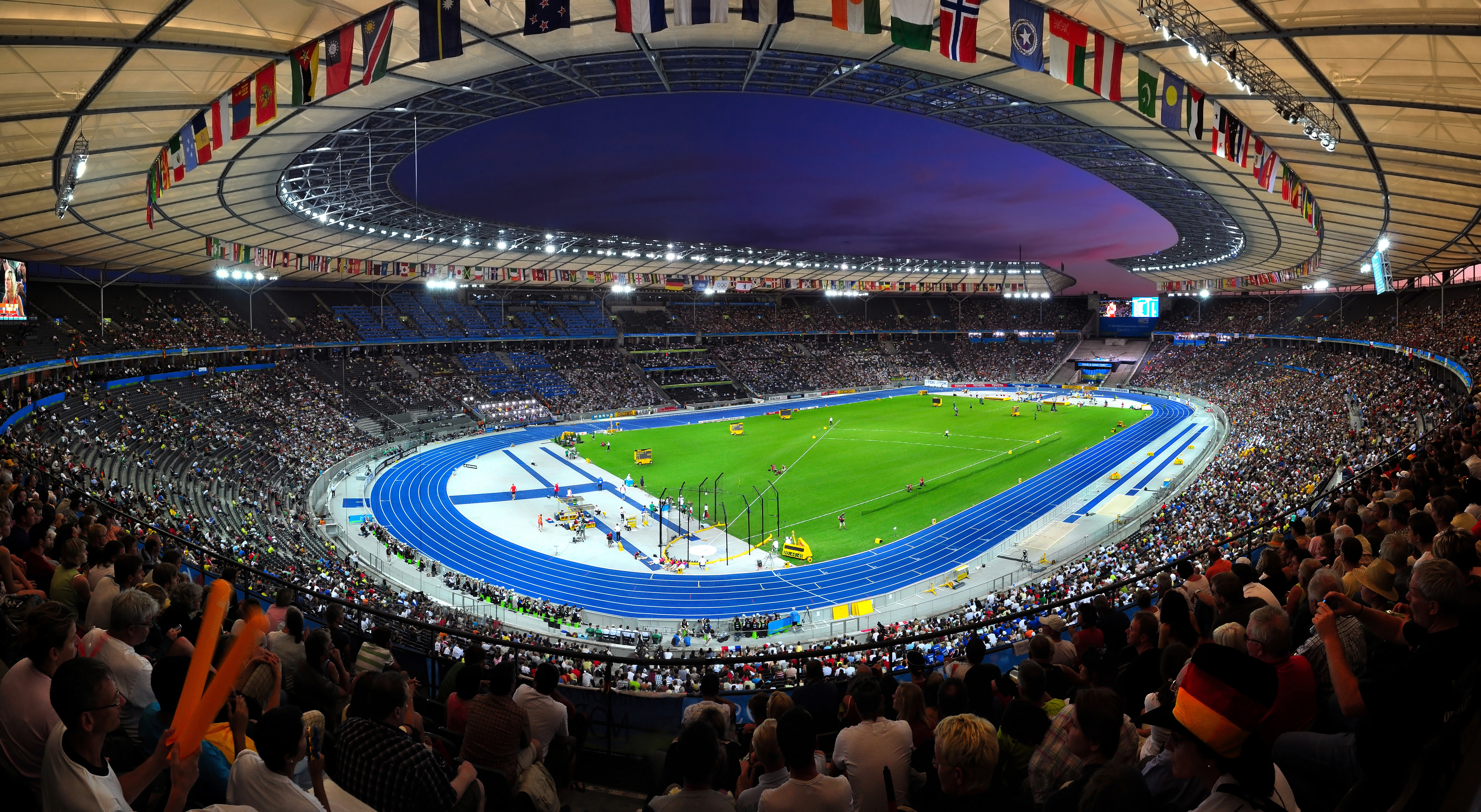
- The Olympic Stadium in Berlin
- Date: August–September
- Location: Olympiastadion, Berlin
- Event type: Track and field athletics
- World Athletics Cat.: B
- Established: 1937
- Website: www.istaf.de/en/

The Internationales Stadionfest (ISTAF) is an annual track and field athletics meeting at the Olympic Stadium in Berlin, Germany. It was first held in July 1921 at the Deutsches Stadion, which was replaced from 1937 by the Stadium of the 1936 Olympic Games. Since 2006 ISTAF has been sponsored by DKB and officially known as the DKB-ISTAF and from 2010, had been part of the IAAF World Challenge, the second tier of global one day athletics events. Nowadays, the meeting is a part of the World Athletics Continental Tour Silver tier, the third ranked tier.

== History ==
On 3 July 1921, the Berliner Sport-Club (BSC), the Sport-Club Charlottenburg (SCC) and the Schwimm-Club Poseidon organised the first sports festival under the current name of Internationales Stadionfest or ISTAF. On 23 March 1937 the BSC, the Deutscher Sport-Club (DSC, later Olympischer Sport-Club OSC) and the SCC, agreed to hold international sports festivals together and organized the first meeting on 1 August 1937 at the Olympic Stadium, where the event is still held today. Four ISTAF meetings, in 1938, 1941, the first post-war in 1949, as well as 1953, were all held at the Mommsen Stadium, but since 1955 meetings have been held annually at Berlin's Olympic Stadium in Charlottenburg. The 2002 and 2003 ISTAF meetings were held at the Friedrich-Ludwig-Jahn-Sportpark instead, due to reconstruction of the Olympic Stadium in preparation for the 2006 FIFA World Cup.

There were several ISTAF-free years during the Second World War and after: 1940, as well as 1943-48 and again in 1950 and 1951. A meeting wasn't held in 1972 because of the 1972 Summer Olympics and again in 1973, as a result of the terrorist attack at the 1972 Olympic Games. From 1993 to 1997, the IAAF classified ISTAF among the Golden Four meetings and from 1998 to 2009, it became part of the IAAF Golden League. When the Diamond League was conceived, it had been provisionally planned for Berlin to hold one of its meetings, but it was unable to meet the criteria set for the new elite series, therefore as from 2010, ISTAF became part of the second tier World Challenge circuit instead.

== Indoor events ==
ISTAF was also held as an indoor meeting at the Deutschlandhalle for a few years until 1968, and from 2014 onwards as the ISTAF Indoor at the Mercedes Benz Arena (formerly O2 World Berlin), the first large indoor athletics event in Berlin for some time.

On 31 January 2021, the ISTAF Indoor Düsseldorf was held in Düsseldorf as the successor to the PSD Bank Meeting, against a larger backdrop at the ISS Dome. Meeting director and managing director of the ISTAF is Martin Seeber.

== World records ==
Over the course of its history, many world records have been set at the ISTAF.

World records set at the ISTAF Berlin
Year	Event	Record	Athlete	Nationality
1937	100 m	11.6 h	Stanisława Walasiewicz	Poland
1937	80 m hurdles	11.6 h	Barbara Burke	South Africa
1939	Long jump	6.12 m	Christel Schulz	(Germany) German Reich
1970	3000 m steeplechase	8:22.0 h	Kerry O'Brien	Australia
1975	100 m	9.9 h	Steve Williams	United States
1975	110 m hurdles	13.0 h	Guy Drut	France
1977	High jump	1.97 m	Rosemarie Ackermann	East Germany
1977	High jump	2.00 m	Rosemarie Ackermann	East Germany
1978	1000 m	2:32.0 h	Ulrike Bruns	East Germany
1978	400 m hurdles	55.44	Krystyna Kacperczyk	Poland
1985	1500 m	3:29.46	Saïd Aouita	Morocco
1989	10,000 m	27:08.23	Arturo Barrios	Mexico
1990	1000 m	2:30.67	Christine Wachtel	East Germany
1999	2000 m	4:44.79	Hicham El Guerrouj	Morocco
2010	800 m	1:41.09	David Rudisha	Kenya
2014	Hammer throw	79.58 m	Anita Włodarczyk	Poland
2015	2000 m steeplechase	6:02.16	Virginia Nyambura Nganga	Kenya
2017	600 m	1:21.77	Caster Semenya	South Africa
2019	2000 m steeplechase	5:52.80	Gesa-Felicitas Krause	Germany
2024	600 m	1:21.63	Mary Moraa	Kenya

== Meeting records ==
=== Men ===
Men's meeting records of the ISTAF Berlin
Event	Record	Athlete	Nationality	Date	Ref.
100 m	9.82 (−0.1 m/s)	Yohan Blake	Jamaica	11 September 2011	
200 m	19.97 (+0.5 m/s)	Frankie Fredericks	Namibia	30 August 1996	
400 m	43.94	Michael Johnson	United States	27 August 1993	
800 m	1:41.09	David Rudisha	Kenya	22 August 2010	
1500 m	3:29.46	Saïd Aouita	Morocco	23 August 1985	
Mile	3:45.60	Hicham El Guerrouj	Morocco	26 August 1997	
2000 m	4:44.79	Hicham El Guerrouj	Morocco	7 September 1999	
3000 m	7:28.99	Tariku Bekele	Ethiopia	22 August 2010	
Two miles	8:17.6 h	Rod Dixon	New Zealand	21 August 1974	
5000 m	12:50.55	Moses Ndiema Masai	Kenya	1 June 2008	
10,000 m	27:08.23	Arturo Barrios	Mexico	18 August 1989	
110 m hurdles	12.97 (+1.2 m/s)	Aries Merritt	United States	2 September 2012	
400 m hurdles	47.08	Karsten Warholm	Norway	13 September 2020	
3000 m steeplechase	8:04.48	Paul Kipsiele Koech	Kenya	11 September 2011	
High jump	2.36 m	Javier Sotomayor	Cuba	30 August 1994	
Pole vault	6.05 m	Sergey Bubka	Ukraine	30 August 1994	
Long jump	8.57 m (+0.5 m/s)	Mike Powell	United States	21 August 1992	
Triple jump	17.69 m (−0.5 m/s)	Jonathan Edwards	United Kingdom	30 August 1996	
Shot put	21.61 m	Ryan Whiting	United States	11 September 2011	
Discus throw	70.60 m	Lars Riedel	Germany	30 August 1996	
Hammer throw	82.84 m	Heinz Weis	West Germany	18 August 1989	
Javelin throw	93.52 m (old design)	Bob Roggy	United States	20 August 1982	
Javelin throw	91.30 m (current design)	Jan Železný	Czechoslovakia	1 September 1995	
4 × 100 m relay	37.65	Team USA I: Jon Drummond; Bernard Williams; Curtis Johnson; Maurice Greene	United States	1 September 2000	

=== Women ===
Women's meeting records of the ISTAF Berlin
Event	Record	Athlete	Nationality	Date	Ref.
100 m	10.78	Marion Jones	United States	1 September 2000	
200 m	21.96 (+0.2 m/s)	Katrin Krabbe	Germany	10 September 1991	
400 m	49.07	Tonique Williams-Darling	Bahamas	12 September 2004	
600 m	1:21.63	Mary Moraa	Kenya	1 September 2024	
800 m	1:54.99	Pamela Jelimo	Kenya	1 June 2008	
1000 m	2:30.67	Christine Wachtel	East Germany	17 August 1990	
1500 m	3:57.40	Laura Muir	Great Britain	13 September 2020	
Mile	4:22.45	Marta Pen Freitas	Portugal	2 September 2018	
3000 m	8:46.66	Natalya Artyomova	Soviet Union	18 August 1989	
5000 m	14:08.79	Letesenbet Gidey	Ethiopia	3 September 2023	
100 m hurdles	12.37 (+1.4 m/s)	Yordanka Donkova	Bulgaria	15 August 1986	
400 m hurdles	53.26	Deon Hemmings	Jamaica	26 August 1997	
2000 m steeplechase	5:52.80	Gesa-Felicitas Krause	Germany	1 September 2019	
3000 m steeplechase	9:03.70	Norah Jeruto	Kenya	27 August 2017	
High jump	2.06 m	Ariane Friedrich	Germany	14 June 2009	
Pole vault	4.83 m	Elena Isinbaeva	Russia	14 June 2009	
Long jump	7.10 m	Heike Drechsler	Germany	16 September 1992	
Triple jump	14.88 m (−0.2 m/s)	Tatyana Lebedeva	Russia	10 August 2003	
Shot put	21.02 m	Chase Jackson	United States	30 August 2026	
Discus throw	71.16 m	Valarie Allman	United States	12 September 2021	
Hammer throw	79.58 m	Anita Włodarczyk	Poland	31 August 2014	
Javelin throw	74.56 m (old design)	Petra Felke	East Germany	23 August 1985	
Javelin throw	70.53 m (current design)	Maria Abakumova	Russia	1 September 2013	
4 × 100 m relay	41.55	Team USA: Alice Brown; Diane Williams; Florence Griffith Joyner; Jeanette Bolden	United States	21 August 1987	
4 × 100 m mixed relay	40.58	Kerron Stewart; Aleen Bailey; Mario Forsythe; Kemar Bailey-Cole	Jamaica	2 September 2012	

== List of winners ==
=== Track disciplines ===
100 m, Men
Year	Winner	Nationality	Time (s)
1937	Gerd Hornberger	Nazi Germany	10.6
1938	Tinus Osendarp	Netherlands	10.5
1939	Karl Neckermann	Nazi Germany	10.7
1941	Karl Fehrmann	Nazi Germany	10.8
1942	Tinus Osendarp	Nazi Germany	10.8
1949	Ernst Rohrssen	West Germany	10.8
1952	Andrew Stanfield	United States	10.5
1953	George Brown	United States	10.9
1955	Carl Kaufmann	West Germany	10.9
1956	Manfred Steinbach	East Germany	10.5
1957	Leamon King	United States	10.4
1958	Armin Hary	West Germany	10.5
1959	Armin Hary	West Germany	10.4
1960	Armin Hary	West Germany	10.2
1961	Manfred Germar	West Germany	10.5
1962	Peter Gamper	West Germany	10.2
1963	Peter Gamper	West Germany	10.3
1964	Heinz Schumann (de)	West Germany	10.2
1965	Jürgen Schröter	West Germany	10.4
1966	Hideo Iijima	Japan	10.1
1967	Karl-Peter Schmidtke	West Germany	10.3
1969	Günther Nickel	West Germany	10.5
1970	Donald Quarrie	Jamaica	10.4
1971	Bobby Turner	United States	10.4
1974	Steve Riddick	United States	10.2
1975	Steve Williams	United States	9.9 =WR
1976	Donald Quarrie	Jamaica	10.0
1977	Clancy Edwards	United States	10.37
1978	Steve Williams	United States	10.21
1979	Houston McTear	United States	10.17
1980	Stanley Floyd	United States	10.25
1981	Herman Panzo	France	10.14
1982	Carl Lewis	United States	10.08
1983	Carl Lewis	United States	10.07
1984	Calvin Smith	United States	10.23
1985	Marian Woronin	Poland	10.20
1986	Chidi Imoh	Nigeria	10.00
1987	Calvin Smith	United States	10.12
1988	Calvin Smith	United States	10.12
1989	Leroy Burrell	United States	10.08
1990	Leroy Burrell	United States	10.17
1991	Leroy Burrell	United States	10.04
1992	Linford Christie	United Kingdom	9.99
1993	Leroy Burrell	United States	10.12
1994	Dennis Mitchell	United States	10.00
1995	Donovan Bailey	Canada	10.10
1996	Dennis Mitchell	United States	10.08
1997	Frankie Fredericks	Namibia	9.99
1998	Maurice Greene	United States	9.94
1999	Bruny Surin	Canada	10.07
2000	Maurice Greene	United States	9.86
2001	Francis Obikwelu	Nigeria	9.98
2002	Dwain Chambers	United Kingdom	10.02
2003	Darvis Patton	United States	10.17
2004	not held		
2005	Dwight Thomas	Jamaica	10.01
2006	Asafa Powell	Jamaica	9.86
2007	Jaysuma Saidy Ndure	Norway	10.14
2008	Nesta Carter	Jamaica	10.08
2009	Daniel Bailey	Antigua and Barbuda	10.03
2010	Nesta Carter	Jamaica	9.96
2011	Yohan Blake	Jamaica	9.82
2012	Kemar Bailey-Cole	Jamaica	10.00
2013	Kemar Bailey-Cole	Jamaica	10.04
2014	Richard Thompson	Trinidad and Tobago	10.15

100 m, Women
Year	Winner	Nationality	Time (s)
1937	Stanisława Walasiewicz	Poland	11.9
1938	Stanisława Walasiewicz	Poland	11.8
1939	Fanny Koen	Netherlands	12.0
1941	not held		
1942	Christel Schulz (de)	Nazi Germany	12.3
1949	not held		
1952	Fanny Blankers-Koen	Netherlands	11.7
1953	Ingrid Kühn	West Germany	11.3
1955	Gisela Köhler	East Germany	12.0
1956	Gisela Köhler	East Germany	11.5
1957	Brunhilde Hendrix	West Germany	11.9
1958	Inge Fuhrmann	West Germany	11.8
1959	Anni Biechl	West Germany	11.7
1960	Wilma Rudolph	United States	11.5
1961	Jutta Heine	West Germany	11.7
1962	Joke Bijleveld	Netherlands	11.7
1963	Jutta Heine	West Germany	11.6
1964	Erika Pollmann (de)	West Germany	11.5
1965	Maureen Tranter	United Kingdom	11.7
1966	Hannelore Trabert (de)	West Germany	11.7
1967	Hannelore Trabert (de)	West Germany	11.5
1969	Jutta Stöck (de)	West Germany	11.6
1970	Annelie Wilden (de)	West Germany	11.6
1971	Elfgard Schittenhelm	West Germany	11.4
1974	Irena Szewińska	Poland	11.1
1975	Inge Helten	West Germany	11.2
1976	Annegret Richter	West Germany	11.24
1977	Elvira Possekel	West Germany	11.61
1978	Annegret Richter	West Germany	11.16
1979	Evelyn Ashford	United States	11.02
1980	Angella Taylor	Canada	11.25
1981	Linda Haglund	Sweden	11.06
1982	Merlene Ottey	Jamaica	11.14
1983	Merlene Ottey	Jamaica	11.09
1984	Evelyn Ashford	United States	10.94
1985	Alice Brown	United States	11.06
1986	Evelyn Ashford	United States	10.93
1987	Gail Devers	United States	10.98
1988	Alice Brown	United States	11.18
1989	Nelli Fiere-Cooman	Netherlands	11.23
1990	Merlene Ottey	Jamaica	10.82
1991	Merlene Ottey	Jamaica	10.84
1992	Irina Privalova	Russia	10.93
1993	Merlene Ottey	Jamaica	11.01
1994	not held		
1995	not held		
1996	Gail Devers	United States	10.89
1997	Marion Jones	United States	10.81
1998	Marion Jones	United States	10.81
1999	not held		
2000	Marion Jones	United States	10.78
2001	Myriam Léonie Mani	Cameroon	11.13
2002	Marion Jones	United States	11.01
2003	Kelli White	United States	10.84
2004	Debbie Ferguson	Bahamas	11.14
2005	Christine Arron	France	11.01
2006	Sherone Simpson	Jamaica	10.92
2007	Carmelita Jeter	United States	11.15
2008	Verena Sailer	Germany	11.53
2009	Kerron Stewart	Jamaica	11.00
2010	Sherone Simpson	Jamaica	11.09
2011	Kelly-Ann Baptiste	Trinidad and Tobago	11.15
2012	Kelly-Ann Baptiste	Trinidad and Tobago	11.25
2013	LaKeisha Lawson	United States	11.18
2014	Kerron Stewart	Jamaica	11.25

200 m, Men
Year	Winner	Nationality	Time (s)
1937	not held		
1938	Jakob Scheuring (de)	Nazi Germany	21.7
1939	Jakob Scheuring (de)	Nazi Germany	21.2
1941	not held		
1942	Harald Mellerowicz (de)	Nazi Germany	21.5
1949	Hans Hieke	West Germany	22.8
1952	McDonald Bailey	United States	20.9
1953	George Brown	United States	21.9
1954	Walter Sichling	West Germany	22.5
1955	Heinz Fütterer	West Germany	21.4
1956	Martin Lauer	West Germany	21.6
1957	Leamon King	United States	21.3
1958	Manfred Germar	West Germany	21.7
1959	Livio Berruti	Italy	21.1
1960	Tom Robinson	Bahamas	21.0
1961	Johannes Kaiser	West Germany	21.3
1962	Seraphino Antao	Kenya	20.8
1963	Seraphino Antao	Kenya	21.2
1964	Heinz Schumann (de)	West Germany	20.9
1965	Jürgen Schröter	West Germany	21.4
1966	Josef Schwarz	West Germany	21.0
1967	Josef Schwarz	West Germany	21.2
1969	Ossi Karttunen	Finland	20.9
1970	Donald Quarrie	Jamaica	20.4
1971	Heinz Rienecker	West Germany	21.3
1974	Donald Quarrie	Jamaica	20.5
1975	Manfred Ommer (de)	West Germany	21.0
1976	James Gilkes	Guyana	20.51
1977	Clancy Edwards	United States	20.14
1978	James Gilkes	Guyana	20.34
1979	James Gilkes	Guyana	20.44
1980	Fred Taylor	United States	20.82
1981	Allan Wells	United Kingdom	20.15
1982	Jeffrey Phillips	United States	20.40
1983	Mel Lattany	United States	20.22
1984	James Butler	United States	20.45
1985	Kirk Baptiste	United States	20.45
1986	not held		
1987	Carl Lewis	United States	20.09
1988	not held		
1989	Robson da Silva	Brazil	20.28
1990	Robson da Silva	Brazil	20.28
1991	not held		
1992	Frankie Fredericks	Namibia	20.01
1993	not held		
1994	not held		
1995	not held		
1996	Frankie Fredericks	Namibia	19.97
1997	Jon Drummond	United States	20.07
1998	not held		
1999	Maurice Greene	United States	20.21
2000-03	not held		
2004	Asafa Powell	Jamaica	20.24
2005	Christopher Williams	Jamaica	20.33
2006	not held		
2007	Wallace Spearmon	United States	20.22
2008	not held		
2009-12	not held		
2013	not held		
2014	not held		

200 m, Women
Year	Winner	Nationality	Time (s)
1937	not held		
1938	not held		
1939	Dorle Voigt	Nazi Germany	25.1
1941	not held		
1942	not held		
1949	not held		
1952	not held		
1953	not held		
1954	not held		
1955	not held		
1956	not held		
1957	not held		
1958	Barbara Janiczewska	Poland	24.2
1959	not held		
1960	not held		
1961	not held		
1962	Brenda Fletcher	United Kingdom	25.2
1963	Helga Henning (de)	West Germany	24.4
1964	not held		
1965	not held		
1966	not held		
1967	not held		
1969	Rita Jahn	West Germany	23.4
1970	Annelie Wilden (de)	West Germany	23.8
1971	Alice Anum	Ghana	23.2
1974	Irena Szewińska	Poland	22.6
1975	not held		
1976	Lorna Forde	Barbados	23.95
1977	Jacqueline Pusey (de)	Jamaica	23.28
1978	Evelyn Ashford	United States	23.41
1979	Annegret Richter	West Germany	22.83
1980	Angella Taylor	Canada	23.03
1981	not held		
1982	not held		
1983	not held		
1984	not held		
1985	not held		
1986	not held		
1987	Angella Taylor-Issajenko	Canada	22.55
1988	Grace Jackson	Jamaica	22.70
1989	not held		
1990	not held		
1991	Katrin Krabbe	Germany	21.96
1992	not held		
1993	not held		
1994	Merlene Ottey	Jamaica	22.07
1995	Gwen Torrence	United States	21.98
1996	not held		
1997	not held		
1998	not held		
1999	Debbie Ferguson	Bahamas	22.55
2000-03	not held		
2004	not held		
2005	not held		
2006	not held		
2007	Lauryn Williams	United States	22.95
2008	Sherone Simpson	Jamaica	22.43
2009-12	not held		
2013	Tiffany Townsend	United States	22.77
2014	not held		

400 m, Men
Year	Winner	Nationality	Time (s)
1937	Rudolf Harbig	Nazi Germany	47.8
1938	Rudolf Harbig	Nazi Germany	48.0
1939	not held		
1941	not held		
1942	Mario Lanzi	Italy	47.5
1949	not held		
1952	Georg Sallen	West Germany	49.6
1953	Jim Lea	United States	46.9
1954	Joachim Seifert	West Germany	51.2
1955	Hans-Joachim Kowalewsky	West Germany	49.0
1956	Manfred Poerschke (de)	West Germany	48.0
1957	Manfred Poerschke (de)	West Germany	47.5
1958	Udo Waldheim	West Germany	48.2
1959	Carl Kaufmann	West Germany	47.6
1960	George Kerr	Jamaica	46.4
1961	Manfred Kinder	West Germany	46.9
1962	Hansruedi Bruder	Switzerland	46.6
1963	Johannes Schmitt	West Germany	46.9
1964	Jean-Paul Boccardo	France	46.8
1965	Manfred Kinder	West Germany	46.9
1966-67	not held		
1969	Horst-Rüdiger Schlöske	West Germany	46.5
1970	Lee Evans	United States	45.9
1971	Thomas Jordan	West Germany	46.1
1972-73	not held		
1974	Hermann Köhler	West Germany	46.5
1975	Franz Hofmeister	West Germany	46.6
1976	Fred Newhouse	United States	45.86
1977	Robert Taylor	United States	45.22
1978	Jerzy Pietrzyk	Poland	46.28
1979	Tony Darden	United States	45.45
1980	Rick Mitchell; Willie Smith	Australia; United States	45.33
1981	Walter McCoy	United States	45.60
1982	Walter McCoy	United States	45.45
1983	Bert Cameron	Jamaica	45.01
1984	Alonzo Babers	United States	45.52
1985	Ray Armstead	United States	45.36
1986	Darrell Robinson	United States	44.86
1987	Butch Reynolds	United States	44.49
1988	not held		
1989	Danny Everett	United States	44.80
1990	Danny Everett	United States	44.61
1991	Steve Lewis	United States	44.56
1992	Samson Kitur	Kenya	44.75
1993	Michael Johnson	United States	43.94
1994	Michael Johnson	United States	44.04
1995	Michael Johnson	United States	44.56
1996	not held		
1997	Iwan Thomas	United Kingdom	44.90
1998	Michael Johnson	United States	44.62
1999	not held		
2000	Michael Johnson	United States	45.00
2001	not held		
2002	Michael Blackwood	Jamaica	44.87
2003	Jerome Young	United States	45.11
2004	not held		
2006	Jeremy Wariner	United States	44.26
2007	Jeremy Wariner	United States	44.05
2008	LaShawn Merritt	United States	44.03
2009	Chris Brown	Bahamas	45.61
2010	Jermaine Gonzales	Jamaica	44.90
2011	Kirani James	Grenada	45.33
2014	Isaac Makwala	Botswana	44.26

400 m, Women
Year	Winner	Nationality	Time (s)
1937	not held		
1938	not held		
1939	not held		
1941	not held		
1942	not held		
1949	not held		
1952	not held		
1953	not held		
1954	not held		
1955	not held		
1956	not held		
1957	not held		
1958	not held		
1959	not held		
1960	not held		
1961	not held		
1962	not held		
1963	not held		
1964	not held		
1965	not held		
1966-67	not held		
1969	Colette Besson	France	52.9
1970	Marilyn Neufville	Jamaica	52.3
1971	Christel Frese	West Germany	53.6
1972-73	not held		
1974	Krystina Kacperczyk (pl)	Poland	52.0
1975	Rita Wilden	West Germany	52.6
1976	Pirjo Häggman	Finland	51.07
1977	Irena Szewińska	Poland	49.97
1978	Pirjo Häggman	Finland	51.29
1979	not held		
1980	not held		
1981	not held		
1982	not held		
1983	not held		
1984	not held		
1985	Valerie Brisco-Hooks	United States	49.56
1986	Valerie Brisco-Hooks	United States	50.31
1987	Valerie Brisco-Hooks	United States	50.01
1988	Ana Fidelia Quirot	Cuba	50.27
1989	not held		
1990	not held		
1991	not held		
1992	not held		
1993	not held		
1994	not held		
1995	Cathy Freeman	Australia	50.98
1996	Falilat Ogunkoya	Nigeria	50.31
1997	Sandie Richards	Jamaica	49.87
1998	Falilat Ogunkoya	Nigeria	50.31
1999	not held		
2000	not held		
2001	Grit Breuer	Germany	50.78
2002	Ana Guevara	Mexico	49.91
2003	Lorraine Fenton	Jamaica	49.98
2004	Tonique Williams-Darling	Bahamas	49.07
2006	Sanya Richards	United States	49.81
2007	Sanya Richards	United States	49.27
2008	not held		
2009	Sanya Richards	United States	49.57
2010	Debbie Dunn	United States	50.56
2011	Anastasiya Kapachinskaya	Russia	50.75
2014	not held		

800 m, Men
Year	Winner	Nationality	Time (min:s)
1937	not held		
1938	Waclav Gassowski	Poland	1:53.1
1939	Rudolf Harbig	Nazi Germany	1:48.7
1941	not held		
1942	Hans Seibert	Nazi Germany	1:54.2
1949	Gerhard Audorf (de)	West Germany	1:56.8
1952	Mal Whitfield	United States	1:54.4
1953	Mal Whitfield	United States	1:49.7
1954	Günter Dohrow	West Germany	1:51.0
1955	not held		
1956	Roger Moens	Belgium	1:47.2
1957	not held		
1958	Roger Moens	Belgium	1:49.2
1959	Peter Adam	West Germany	1:49.5
1960	George Kerr	Jamaica	1:49.6
1961	not held		
1962	Jozef Lambrechts	Belgium	1:49.8
1963	Rudolf Klaban	Austria	1:49.6
1964	Mamoru Morimoto	Japan	1:47.6
1965	Bill Crothers	Canada	1:49.3
1966	Bodo Tümmler	West Germany	1:47.0
1967	Franz-Josef Kemper	West Germany	1:46.9
1969	Philip Lewis	United Kingdom	1:48.8
1970	Franz-Josef Kemper	West Germany	1:48.3
1971	Mark Winzenried	United States	1:46.2
1972-73	not held		
1974	Mike Boit	Kenya	1:44.3
1975	Mike Boit	Kenya	1:44.9
1976	Mike Boit	Kenya	1:43.57
1977	Mike Boit	Kenya	1:45.09
1978	Mike Boit	Kenya	1:46.20
1979	James Robinson	United States	1:46.09
1980	Willi Wülbeck	West Germany	1:45.68
1981	James Robinson	United States	1:46.56
1982	Willi Wülbeck	West Germany	1:46.31
1983	David Mack	United States	1:44.43
1984	Sammy Koskei	Kenya	1:46.46
1985	Joaquim Cruz	Brazil	1:42.98
1986	Johnny Gray	United States	1:45.90
1987	Billy Konchellah	Kenya	1:44.40
1988	Tom McKean	United Kingdom	1:47.60
1989	Johnny Gray	United States	1:44.02
1990	Johnny Gray	United States	1:45.57
1991	Billy Konchellah	Kenya	1:45.95
1992	Nixon Kiprotich	Kenya	1:44.72
1993	Billy Konchellah	Kenya	1:44.22
1994	Wilson Kipketer	Kenya	1:43.95
1995	Atle Douglas	Norway	1:44.95
1996	Wilson Kipketer	Denmark	1:43.34
1997	not held		
1998	not held		
1999	Wilson Kipketer	Denmark	1:44.03
2000	not held		
2001	André Bucher	Switzerland	1:43.82
2002	Wilfred Bungei	Kenya	1:44.62
2003	Hezekiél Sepeng	South Africa	1:44.71
2004	Yusuf Saad Kamel	Bahrain	1:45.07
2005	Mbulaeni Mulaudzi	South Africa	1:44.26
2006	Mbulaeni Mulaudzi	South Africa	1:44.37
2007	not held		
2008	Abraham Chepkirwok	Uganda	1:44.53
2009	Robin Schembera	Germany	1:45.96
2010	David Rudisha	Kenya	1:41.09 WR
2011	not held		
2012	Mohammed Aman	Ethiopia	1:43.62
2013	Mohammed Aman	Ethiopia	1:43.97
2014	Mohammed Aman	Ethiopia	1:43.52

800 m, Women
Year	Winner	Nationality	Time (min:s)
1937	not held		
1938	not held		
1939	not held		
1941	not held		
1942	not held		
1949	not held		
1952	not held		
1953	not held		
1954	not held		
1955	not held		
1956	not held		
1957	not held		
1958	not held		
1959	not held		
1960	not held		
1961	not held		
1962	Gerda Kraan	Netherlands	2:06.2
1963	not held		
1964	Maryvonne Dupureur	France	2:03.9
1965	not held		
1966	not held		
1967	not held		
1969	Anne-Marie Nenzell (sv)	Sweden	2:05.00
1970	Vera Nikolić	SFR Yugoslavia	2:02.2
1971	Vera Nikolić	SFR Yugoslavia	2.01.0
1972-73	not held		
1974	not held		
1975	Mariana Suman	Romania	2.02.40
1976	Francie Laprieu	United States	2:00.22
1977	Elżbieta Katolik (pl)	Poland	2:00.10
1978	not held		
1979	not held		
1980	Margrit Klinger	West Germany	2:00.50
1981	Margrit Klinger	West Germany	2:00.07
1982	Jolanta Januchta (pl)	Poland	2:01.87
1983	Mary Decker	United States	1:59.14
1984	not held		
1985	Jarmila Kratochvílová	Czechoslovakia	1:58.38
1986	Gaby Bußmann	West Germany	1:58.11
1987	Ana Fidelia Quirot	Cuba	1:56.56
1988	not held		
1989	Ana Fidelia Quirot	Cuba	1:57.90
1990	not held		
1991	not held		
1992	Ellen van Langen	Netherlands	1:59.55
1993	Maria Mutola	Mozambique	1:57.99
1994	not held		
1995	Maria Mutola	Mozambique	1:57.61
1996	not held		
1997	Maria Mutola	Mozambique	1:56.93
1998	not held		
1999	Maria Mutola	Mozambique	1:57.56
2000	not held		
2001	Maria Mutola	Mozambique	1:59.19
2002	not held		
2003	Maria Mutola	Mozambique	1:59.01
2004	not held		
2005	Zulia Calatayud	Cuba	1:59.25
2006	not held		
2007	Janeth Jepkosgei	Kenya	1:58.62
2008	Pamela Jelimo	Kenya	1:54.99
2009	not held		
2010	Caster Semenya	South Africa	1:59.90
2011	Janeth Jepkosgei	Kenya	1:58.26
2012	Pamela Jelimo	Kenya	1:58.68
2013	not held		
2014	Tigist Assefa	Ethiopia	2:00.16

1500 m, Men
Year	Winner	Nationality	Time (min:s)
1937	not held		
1938	Herbert Jacob	Nazi Germany	3:58.2
1939	not held		
1941	not held		
1942	Rolf Seidenschnur	Nazi Germany	3:51.4
1949	Lennart Strand	Sweden	3:56.8
1952	Josy Barthel	Luxembourg	3:51.0
1953	Werner Lueg	West Germany	3:52.4
1954	Günter Dohrow	West Germany	3:53.8
1955-57	not held		
1958	Marian Jochman (pl)	Poland	3:49.7
1959	Tomás Barris	Spain	3:51.9
1960	Klaus Ostach	West Germany	3:47.3
1961	Klaus Lehmann	West Germany	3:43.0
1962	Karl Eyerkaufer (de)	West Germany	3:47.1
1963	Harald Norpoth	Austria	3:46.9
1964	Eugène Allonsius	Belgium	3:45.5
1965	Jim Grelle	United States	3:44.0
1967-1983	not held		
1984	not held		
1985	Saïd Aouita	Morocco	3:29.46 WR
1986	Enda Fitzpatrick	Ireland	3:39.18
1987	not held		
1988	not held		
1989-93	not held		
1994	Vénuste Niyongabo	Burundi	3:31.18
1995	not held		
1996	not held		
1997	not held		
1998	Hicham El Guerrouj	Morocco	3:31.18
1999	not held		
2000	Hicham El Guerrouj	Morocco	3:30.90
2001	not held		
2002	Hicham El Guerrouj	Morocco	3:30.00
2003	not held		
2004	Paul Korir	Kenya	3:32.46
2005	Daniel Kipchirchir Komen	Kenya	3:29.72
2006	Augustine Kiprono Choge	Kenya	3:32.48
2007	Daniel Kipchirchir Komen	Kenya	3:34.09
2008	Augustine Kiprono Choge	Kenya	3:31.57
2009	Augustine Kiprono Choge	Kenya	3:29.47
2010	Silas Kiplagat	Kenya	3:30.31
2011	Augustine Kiprono Choge	Kenya	3:31.14
2012	Nixon Chepseba	Kenya	3:33.11
2013	İlham Tanui Özbilen	Turkey	3:35.58
2014	Mekonnen Gebremedhin	Ethiopia	3:33.24

1500 m, Women
Year	Winner	Nationality	Time (min:s)
1937	not held		
1938	not held		
1939	not held		
1941	not held		
1942	not held		
1949	not held		
1952	not held		
1953	not held		
1954	not held		
1955-57	not held		
1958	not held		
1959	not held		
1960	not held		
1961	not held		
1962	not held		
1963	not held		
1964	not held		
1965	not held		
1967-1983	not held		
1984	Brit McRoberts	Canada	4:12.61
1985	not held		
1986	not held		
1987	not held		
1988	Paula Ivan	Romania	4:00.24
1989-93	not held		
1994	Angela Chalmers	Canada	4:04.39
1995	not held		
1996	Svetlana Masterkova	Russia	4:06.87
1997	not held		
1998	Svetlana Masterkova	Russia	4:03.19
1999	not held		
2000	Violeta Szekely	Romania	4:02.80
2001	Violeta Szekely	Romania	4:00.80
2002	Süreyya Ayhan	Turkey	3:58.43
2003	Süreyya Ayhan	Turkey	3:59.58
2004	Tatyana Tomashova	Russia	4:04.41
2005	not held		
2006	not held		
2007	not held		
2008	not held		
2009	not held		
2010	not held		
2011	not held		
2012	not held		
2013	Yekaterina Sharmina	Russia	4:10.47
2014	not held		
