= Otis Davis =

American sprinter (1932–2024)

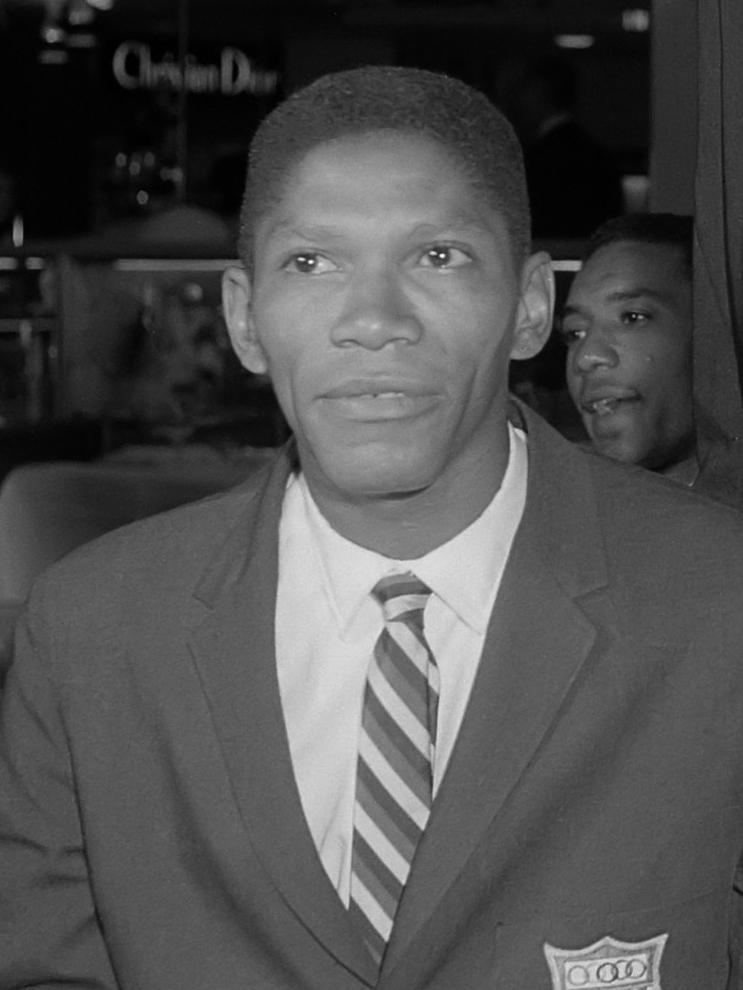
- Davis in 1960

Personal information
- Born: July 12, 1932 Tuscaloosa, Alabama, U.S.
- Died: September 14, 2024 (aged 92) North Bergen, New Jersey, U.S.
- Height: 6 ft 1 in (1.85 m)
- Weight: 163 lb (74 kg)

Sport
- Country: United States
- Sport: Track and field
- Events: 400-meter dash 4 × 400 m relay
- College team: University of Oregon
- Club: Philadelphia Pioneer Club
- Coached by: Bill Bowerman
Medal record
Representing the United States
Olympic Games
| Gold medal – first place | 1960 Rome | 400 m |
| Gold medal – first place | 1960 Rome | 4 × 400 m relay |

Otis Crandall Davis (July 12, 1932 – September 14, 2024) was an American athlete, winner of two gold medals for record-breaking performances in the 400 m and 4 × 400 m relay at the 1960 Summer Olympics. He set a new world record of 44.9 seconds in the 400 m and became the first person to break the 45-second barrier.

== Early life ==
Otis Crandall Davis was born in Tuscaloosa, Alabama, on July 12, 1932. He was black and Native American. His father, Johnie Davis, worked as a bellhop, and his mother, Mary Alice Davis, taught science and worked as a movie theater cashier. He grew up in a segregated Alabama, and was raised by his maternal grandmother, Carrie Eaton.

He served four years in the United States Air Force during the Korean War.

== Career ==
=== College ===
Following the Air Force, Davis attended enrolled at Los Angeles City College, where he played basketball. In 1957, he transferred to the University of Oregon on a basketball scholarship. One day in 1958 while observing athletes running on the track with a friend, Davis, who had never run before, nor attended schools in his youth with sports programs other than basketball and football, decided that he could beat the athletes he saw on the track. He approached track coach Bill Bowerman, who would later become the founding father of the Nike, Inc., and asked to join the track team. Needing high jumpers instead, Bowerman had Davis try his hand.

Among Davis's first attempts, he jumped 6'0". He recalled: "I had no form. I had no style. I just jumped." He also hit 23'0" in the long jump with little effort, though he was flustered by the sprinting events, relating "I didn't even know how to get in the starting blocks". For his first competitive event, Bowerman entered Davis in the 220-yard dash and the 440-yard dash in the Pacific Coast Conference championships, both of which he won, missing the school record by two tenths of a second in the latter.

According to Davis, Bowerman made the first pair of Nike shoes for him, contradicting the claim that they were made for Phil Knight: "I told Tom Brokaw that I was the first. I don't care what all the billionaires say. Bill Bowerman made the first pair of shoes for me. People don't believe me. In fact, I didn't like the way they felt on my feet. There was no support and they were too tight. But I saw Bowerman make them from the waffle iron, and they were mine."

In 1959, Davis finished seventh in the 440-yard dash in the NCAA Division I Men's Outdoor Track and Field Championships.

In 1960, he graduated from the University of Oregon with a B.S. degree in Health & Physical Education. The university honored him in 2020, as one of eight gold medalists who attended the school. In addition, Davis, along with Bill Bowerman, Ashton Eaton, Steve Prefontaine and Raevyn Rogers, are depicted on a nine-story tower adjacent to Hayward Field.

=== Olympic ===
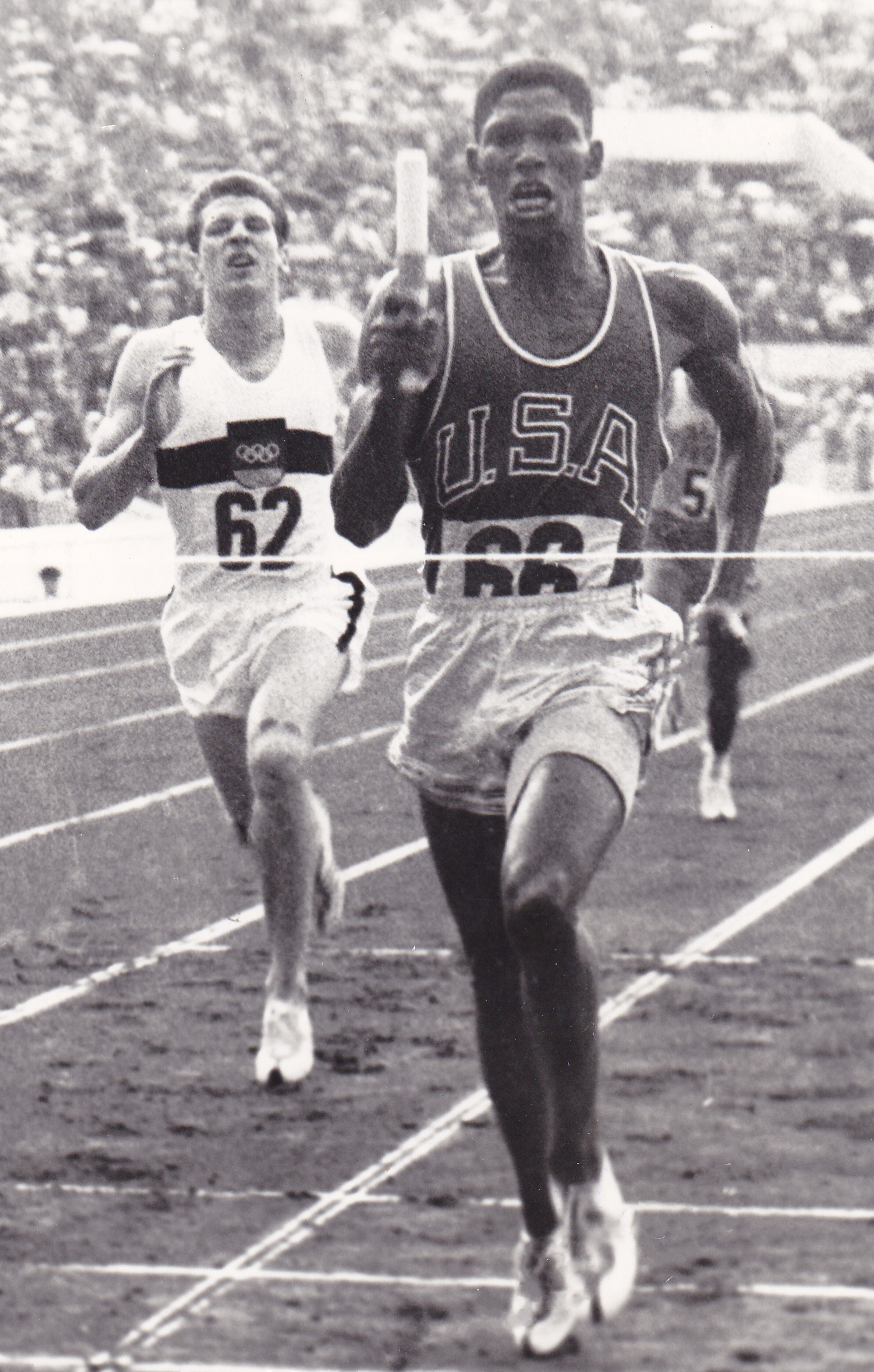
Davis vs. Carl Kaufmann in the 4 × 400 m Olympic final in 1960

Davis was competing on a national level for the Oregon Ducks, and was poised to become a national AAU champion in the 440-yard run. At the age of 28, he made the 1960 United States Olympic team, placing third in the 400-meter race at the Olympic Trials. He ran his fastest time to date one week before participating in the 1960 Summer Olympics in Rome as one of the oldest members of the track team, where he was nicknamed "Pops" by his teammates. He remembered: "I was still learning how to turn with the staggered starts and all. I was still learning the strategy involved. I was still learning how to run in the lanes."

On September 6, 1960, Davis ran against the heavily favored German athlete Carl Kaufmann, who was born in Brooklyn and held the world record in the 400-meter dash. Davis won by a hair, setting a world record of 44.9 seconds and becoming the first man to break the heralded 45-second barrier. The photo of the finish, with (in full horizontal dive position) Kaufmann's nose ahead of Davis, but his torso behind, has been studied and discussed by track and field officials for years. Both athletes were awarded the world record time, recorded in the 10ths of a second in those days, but Davis was awarded the win. Two days later, they met again for the 4 × 400 m relay final. Davis anchored the USA team of Jack Yerman, Earl Young and 400-meter hurdles gold medalist Glenn Davis, setting a world record of 3:02.2. The photo of the finish of that race was also made famous in Life magazine.

In 1996 he was a torch-bearer for the Summer Olympics in Atlanta.

=== Post-Olympic ===
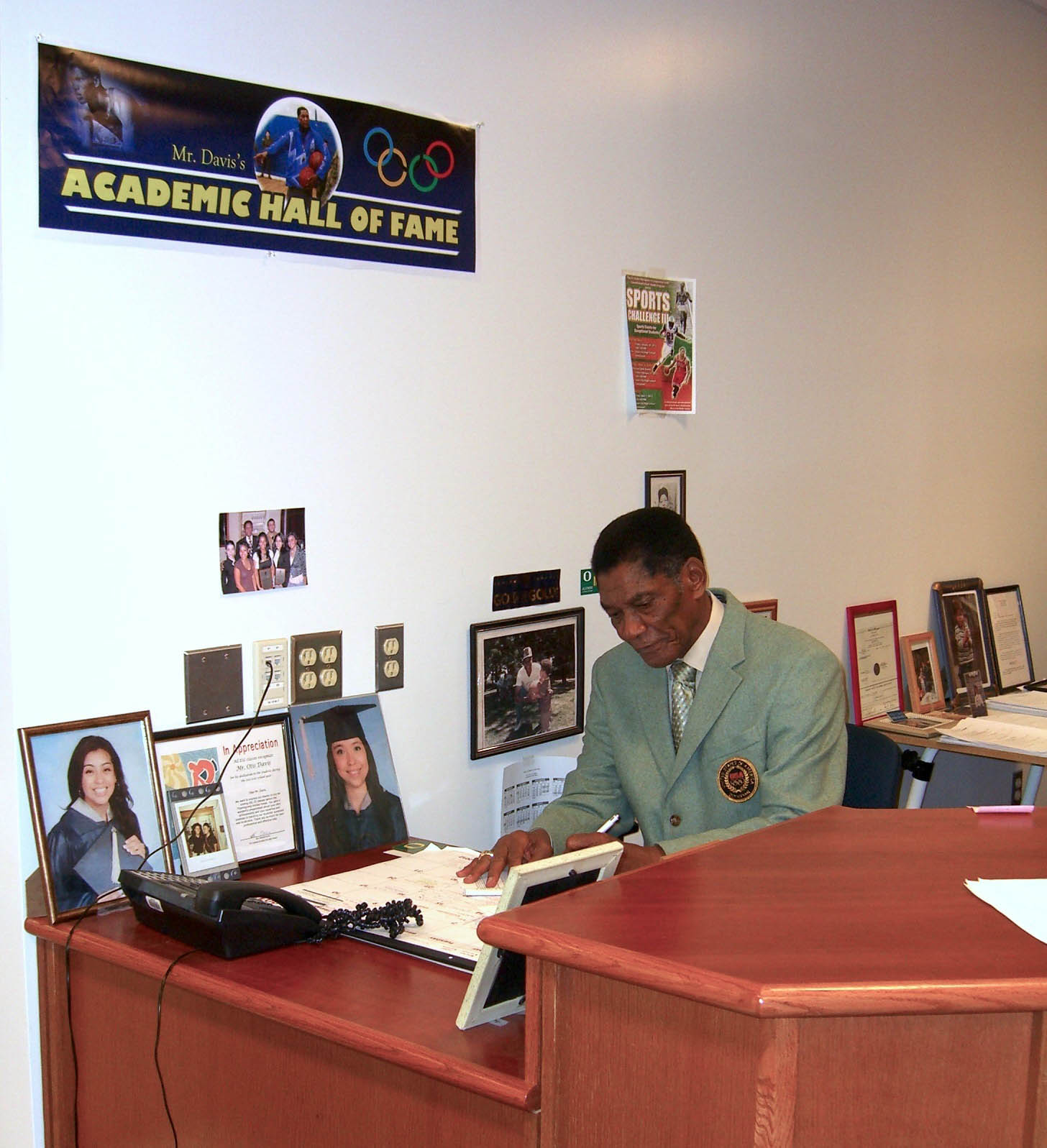
Davis in 2012, at his desk at Union City High School in Union City, New Jersey, where he worked as a verification officer, coach and mentor

Following the Olympics, Davis competed in some sporadic track meets, such as the 1961 U.S. Nationals at Randall's Island, which he won at age 29, but his competitive running career was virtually over, as he never repeated his Olympic performance. He returned to Oregon, and later considered playing as wide receiver for the Los Angeles Rams. After retiring from competition, he became a high school teacher, working in Springfield, Oregon, for many years, and then traveled overseas to work as an athletic director at United States military bases, including McGuire Air Force Base in New Jersey, where he taught in 1989.

In 1991, Davis moved to Jersey City, New Jersey, in order to live closer to New York, eventually settling in Union City.> Around 2002 or 2003. Davis was hired by the Union City Board of Education, and began working at Emerson High School as a truancy officer, teacher, coach and mentor. When he was inducted into the National Track and Field Hall of Fame in 2003, he asked Emerson Principal Robert Fazio to accompany him to the ceremony in Los Angeles, and when the rest of the school's staff learned he was an Olympic medalist, they honored him with a banner posted in a hallway in the school honoring his achievements.

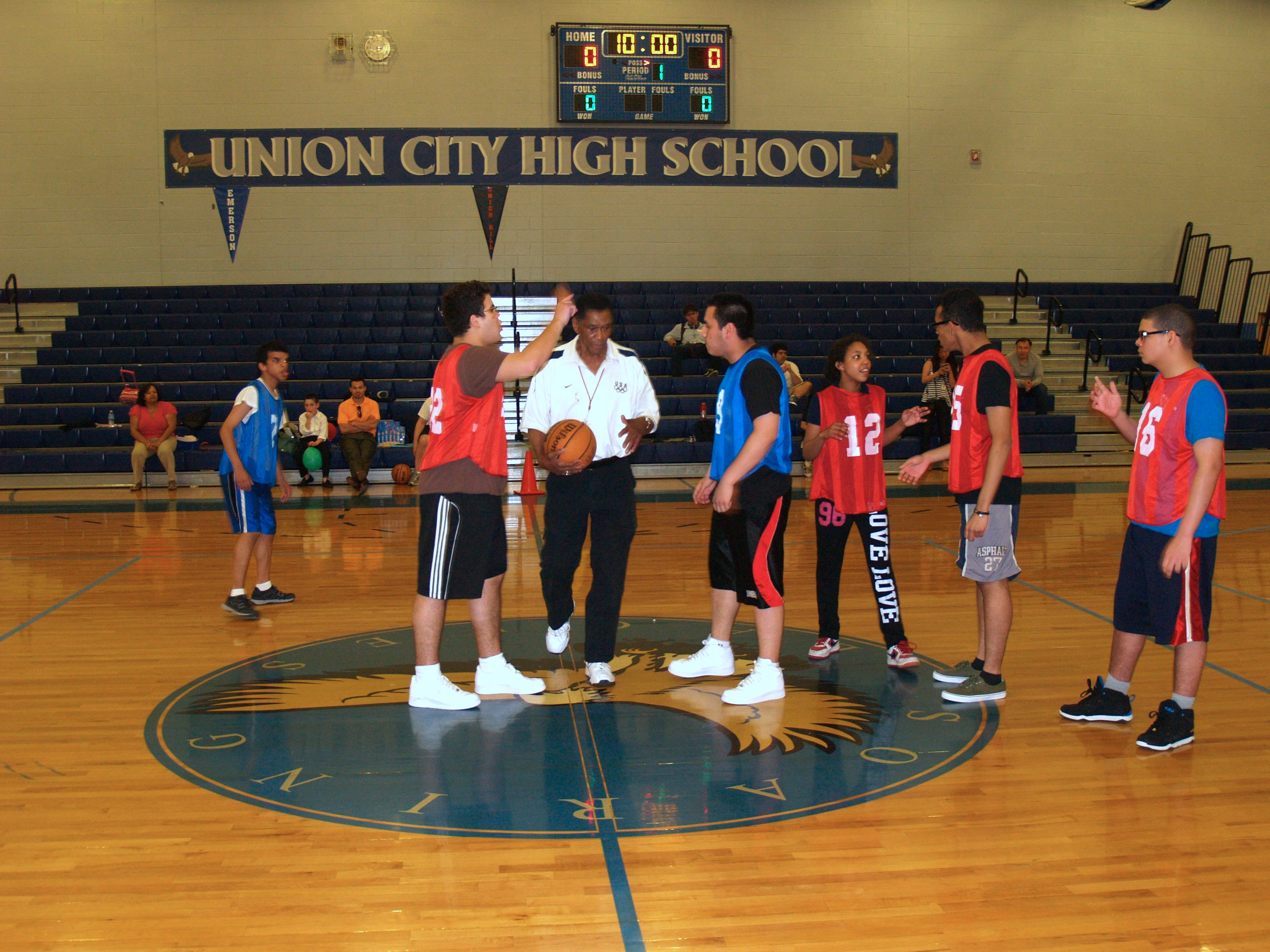
Davis refereeing the Family Fun Fest, an athletic event for special needs children

In 2012, Davis was working as a verification officer at Union City High School, mentoring students. He was also co-founder and, in 2012, president of the Tri-States Olympic Alumni Association, a member of the University of Oregon Hall of Fame and the New Jersey Sports Writers' Halls of Fame.

Davis ran athletic skills programs during the spring and summer in Union City, in order to reach students who did not normally participate in sporting events, and to complement the schools' physical education curricula. Among programs he directed were the Mayor's Cup, first held on June 6, 2011, in which students from the city's several elementary schools compete in events that include sprinting, spring relays and circle relays, and the Sports Challenge, which provides special needs children with the opportunity to be a part of sports activities.

In 2023, Davis published a memoir, Destiny's Daredevil: The Autobiography of an Olympic Champion Helping Others Cross the Finish Line.

== Personal life and death ==
Davis was married to and divorced from Lucille Mathes, and had two daughters.

In 1994, burglars stole Davis's gold medals from his home in New Jersey, but they were recovered and returned within a month.

Davis died in North Bergen, New Jersey, on September 14, 2024, at the age of 92.
