= Bozek =

Bozek may refer to:

- Bozek (surname), a family name
- Bozek, Yenişehir, a neighbourhood in Yenişehir, Diyarbakır Province, Turkey
