= Ernst Zaugg =

Swiss sprinter

Ernst Zaugg (5 April 1934 – 10 December 2016) was a Swiss sprinter who specialized in the 400 metres. He was born in Bern. He finished sixth in the 4 × 400 metres relay at the 1960 Olympic Games with the team René Weber, Hansruedi Bruder and Christian Wägli. His personal best time was 46.6 seconds (1961).
