= Masters M35 200 metres world record progression =

This is the progression of world record improvements of the 200 metres M40 division of Masters athletics.

Key

Incomplete information Wind aided Pending

Hand	Auto	Wind	Athlete	Nationality	Birthdate	Age	Location	Date	Ref
	20.11	(+1.9 m/s)	Linford Christie	Great Britain	2 April 1960	35 years, 84 days	Villeneuve D'Ascq	25 June 1995	
	20.62	(−0.4 m/s)	Don Quarrie	Jamaica	25 February 1951	37 years, 114 days	Eagle Rock	18 June 1988	
	20.68	1.0	Pietro Mennea	Italy	28.06.1952	Molfetta	26.09.1987		
20.8		0.8	Delano Meriwether	United States	23.04.1943	Westwood	09.06.1978		
21.2			Edward Jefferys	South Africa	07.02.1936	Johannesburg	24.01.1976		
21.5			Clifton Bertrand	Trinidad and Tobago	02.03.1936	Randalls Island	08.06.1972		
21.5			Arquimedes Herrera	Venezuela	08.08.1935	Maracaibo	02.09.1970		
