= Athletics at the 1954 World Student Games =

The 1954 World Student Games held in Budapest, Hungary by the Union Internationale des Étudiants (UIE) between 5 and 8 August featured an athletics competition among its programme of events. It was held in the year in-between the biennial World Festival of Youth and Students.

The level of competition was not as high as the previous, festival-associated event, but still featured winning performances from four 1954 European champions: Lajos Szentgáli (800 metres), Anatoliy Yulin (400 metres hurdles), Ödön Földessy (long jump), and Janusz Sidło (javelin throw). Javelin thrower Földessy was the only man to retain his world student title and in the women's section Christa Stubnick repeated her sprint double (the only female repeat victor).

The women's events featured less established talents, though many winners in Budapest went on to greater success. Lyudmila Lisenko, Iolanda Balaș and Vera Krepkina eventually became Olympic champions at the 1960 Rome Olympics, while Christa Stubnick, Gisela Köhler and Irina Beglyakova were all runners-up at the 1956 Melbourne Olympics. Discus bronze medallist Lia Manoliu grew to become Olympic champion fourteen years later.

== Medal summary ==
=== Men ===
Event	Gold		Silver		Bronze	
100 metres	Zdobysław Stawczyk (POL)	10.6	Levan Sanadze (URS)	10.7	Angel Kolev (BUL)	10.8
200 metres	Zdobysław Stawczyk (POL)	21.5	Ewald Schröder (GDR)	21.6	Zenon Baranowski (POL)	21.7
400 metres	Willi Bromberger (GDR)	48.2	Gerard Mach (POL)	48.3	Horst Mann (GDR)	48.5
800 metres	Lajos Szentgáli (HUN)	1:50.5	Edmund Potrzebowski (POL)	1:50.8	László Tanay (HUN)	1:51.5
1500 metres	Edmund Potrzebowski (POL)	3:49.8	Ernő Béres (HUN)	3:50.4	Alojzy Graj (POL)	3:50.8
5000 metres	Alojzy Graj (POL)	14:44.8	László Tábori (HUN)	14:45.6	Ernő Béres (HUN)	14:47.6
10,000 metres	Gyula Pénzes (HUN)	31:02.8	Hubert Berta (HUN)	31:43.6	Tege Yitao (CHN)	33:00.4
110 m hurdles	Boris Stolyarov (URS)	14.3	Vyacheslav Bogatov (URS)	14.5	Ion Opris (ROM)	14.8
400 m hurdles	Anatoliy Yulin (URS)	51.9	Igor Ilyin (URS)	52.1	Ilie Savel (ROM)	52.6
3000 metres steeplechase	Ferenc Dejeny (HUN)	9:00.0	Grigore Cojocaru (ROM)	9:03.4	Jaroslav Slavíček (TCH)	9:20.2
10,000 m walk	Haralambie Racescu (ROM)	47:07.4	Hans-Joachim Kolletzki (GDR)	47:55.6	László Palotai (HUN)	48:07.4
4 × 100 m relay	Soviet Union (URS); Leonid Barteniev; Viktor Ryabov; Levan Sanadze; Boris Tokarev	41.1	Poland (POL); Zenon Baranowski; Wiesław Holajn; Emil Kiszka; Zdobysław Stawczyk	41.4	Hungary (HUN); József Senkei; Géza Varasdi; László Zarándi; Béla Goldoványi	41.5
4 × 400 m relay	East Germany (GDR); Ewald Schröder; Willi Bromberger; Horst Mann; Rolf Seliger	3:14.2	Poland (POL); Gerard Mach; Zbigniew Makomaski; Leszek Sierek; Stanisław Swatowski	3:14.6	Hungary (HUN); Péter Karádi; Béla Deri; József Darvas; Attila Botár	3:16.7
High jump	Jaroslav Kovár (TCH)	1.99 m	Zbigniew Lewandowski (POL)	1.99 m	Yuriy Stepanov (URS)	1.95 m
Pole vault	Tamás Homonnay (HUN)	4.20 m	Edward Adamczyk (POL)	4.15 m	Zenon Ważny (POL)	4.10 m
Long jump	Ödön Földessy (HUN)	7.70 m	Ion Wiesenmayer (ROM)	7.33 m	Nikolay Andrushenko (URS)	7.30 m
Triple jump	Zygfryd Weinberg (POL)	15.30 m	Virgil Zavadescu (ROM)	15.08 m	Ion Sorin (ROM)	15.07 m
Shot put	Vartan Ovsepyan (URS)	15.88 m	Ferenc Kövesdi (HUN)	15.70 m	Gabriel Georgescu (ROM)	15.49 m
Discus throw	József Szécsényi (HUN)	51.19 m	Rudolf Solyóm (HUN)	48.54 m	Géjza Valent, Sr. (TCH)	47.16 m
Hammer throw	Boris Popov (BUL)	55.48 m	Oldrich Engl (TCH)	54.55 m	Lajos Kapcsos (HUN)	53.50 m
Javelin throw	Janusz Sidło (POL)	75.24 m	Zbigniew Radziwonowicz (POL)	70.46 m	Sándor Krasznai (HUN)	69.63 m
Decathlon	Walter Meier (GDR)	6587 pts	Gheorghe Zimbresteanu (ROM)	5746 pts	Tibor Kertész (HUN)	5678 pts

=== Women ===
Event	Gold		Silver		Bronze	
100 metres	Christa Stubnick (GDR)	11.8	Vera Krepkina (URS)	11.8	Mariya Itkina (URS)	11.9
200 metres	Christa Stubnick (GDR)	23.6	Mariya Itkina (URS)	24.2	Vera Krepkina (URS)	24.3
400 metres	Ursula Donath (GDR)	55.0	Polina Solopova (URS)	56.5	Anna Suták (HUN)	58.0
800 metres	Ursula Donath (GDR)	2:10.1	Lyudmila Lisenko (URS)	2:11.3	Dota Barakhovich (URS)	2:12.1
80 m hurdles	Gisela Köhler (GDR)	11.0	Yevgeniya Gurvich (URS)	11.3	Elżbieta Bocian (POL)	11.4
4 × 100 m relay	Soviet Union (URS); Mariya Itkina; Vera Krepkina; Olga Kosheleva; Rimma Uliskina	46.3	East Germany (GDR); Ulla Donath; Gisela Köhler; Christa Stubnick; Alice Köckritz-Karger	46.5	Poland (POL); Elżbieta Bocian; Celina Jesionowska; Maria Kusion; Barbara Janiszewska	47.4
High jump	Iolanda Balaș (ROM)	1.61 m	Ida Németh (HUN)	1.56 m	Erzsébet Kertés (HUN)	1.53 m
Long jump	Elżbieta Duńska (POL)	6.12 m	Maria Kusion (POL)	6.00 m	Galina Vinogradova (URS)	5.94 m
Shot put	Mariya Kuznetsova (URS)	15.01 m	Lea Maremäe (URS)	14.35 m	Edit Sebes (HUN)	12.91 m
Discus throw	Irina Beglyakova (URS)	45.36 m	Zsuzsa Serédi (HUN)	43.59 m	Lia Manoliu (ROM)	42.46 m
Javelin throw	Virve Roolaid (URS)	51.52 m	Erzsébet Vígh (HUN)	47.00 m	Lea Maremäe (URS)	46.65 m
Pentathlon	Elżbieta Duńska (POL)	3971 pts	Nina Martinenko (URS)	3738 pts	Lyudmila Aralova (URS)	3717 pts

== Medal table ==
Rank	Nation	Gold	Silver	Bronze	Total
1	Soviet Union (URS)	8	10	8	26
2	Poland (POL)	8	8	5	21
3	East Germany (GDR)	8	3	1	12
4	Hungary (HUN)	6	8	11	25
5	Romania (ROM)	2	4	5	11
6	Czechoslovakia (TCH)	1	1	2	4
7	Bulgaria (BUL)	1	0	1	2
8	China (CHN)	0	0	1	1
Totals (8 entries)		34	34	34	102

== See also ==
- FISU World University Games § Precursors
- University and college sport
