= René Weber =

Swiss sprinter (1933–1982)

René Weber (20 May 1933 – August 1982) was a Swiss sprinter who specialized in the 400 metres.

Weber was born in Zürich and represented the club LC Zürich. At the 1958 European Championships he reached the semi-final in the 400 metres, and competed in the 4 × 100 metres relay with Emil Weber, Erwin Müller and Hans Wehrli. At the 1960 Olympic Games he competed at the 400 metres without reaching the final, and finished sixth in the 4 × 400 metres relay with the team Hansruedi Bruder, Ernst Zaugg and Christian Wägli.

He became Swiss champion in 1960. His personal best time was 47.0 seconds (1957).
