= Gerard Mach =

Polish sprinter (1926–2015)

Personal information
- Full name: Gerard Zygfryd Mach
- Nationality: Polish
- Born: 16 September 1926 Free City of Danzig
- Died: 22 September 2015 (aged 89) Ottawa, Canada
- Height: 1.75 m (5 ft 9 in)
- Weight: 71 kg (157 lb)

Sport
- Sport: Sprinting
- Event: 200 metres
- Club: KL Lechia Gdańsk

Gerard Zygfryd Mach (16 September 1926 – 22 September 2015) was a Polish sprinter. He competed in the men's 200 metres and 400 metres at the 1952 Summer Olympics. Before focusing fully on athletics, Mach also played football in Gdańsk before the age of 20, playing for both Gedania Gdańsk and Lechia Gdańsk, making 3 appearances and scoring 2 goals in the league for Lechia.

== International competitions ==
Year	Competition	Venue	Position	Event	Notes
Representing Poland
1949	World Festival of Youth and Students	Budapest, Hungary	3rd	Medley relay	3:31.3
1951	World Festival of Youth and Students	East Berlin, East Germany	3rd	4 × 400 m relay	3:17.2
1952	Olympic Games	Helsinki, Finland	20th (qf)	200 m	22.12
1952	Olympic Games	Helsinki, Finland	18th (h)	400 m	48.64^{1}
1954	World Student Games	Budapest, Hungary	2nd	400 m	48.3
1954	World Student Games	Budapest, Hungary	2nd	4 × 400 m relay	3:14.6
1954	European Championships	Bern, Switzerland	17th (h)	400 m	48.9
1954	European Championships	Bern, Switzerland	7th (h)	4 × 400 m relay	3:13.1
1955	World Festival of Youth and Students	Warsaw, Poland	2nd	4 × 400 m relay	3:11.8
1958	European Championships	Stockholm, Sweden	17th (sf)	400 m	48.5

^{1}Did not start in the quarterfinals

== Personal bests ==
- 100 metres – 10.8h (Gdańsk 1951)
- 200 metres – 21.4h (Bydgoszcz 1957)
- 400 metres – 47.5h (Bydgoszcz 1958)
