= Bozsik =

Bozsik ([ˈboʒik] is a Hungarian surname, the Hungarianization of the Slovak surname Božik. Notable people with the surname include.

- Anna Bozsik (born 1965), Hungarian biathlete
- Attila Bozsik, Hungarian sprint canoer
- Gábor Bozsik (born 1981), Hungarian sprint canoer
- József Bozsik (1925–1978), Hungarian footballer
- Levente Bozsik (born 1980), Hungarian footballer
- Péter Bozsik (born 1961), Hungarian football manager
