= Jerzy Kowalski (athlete) =

Polish sprinter (1937–2023)

Personal information
- Full name: Jerzy Władysław Kowalski
- Nationality: Polish
- Born: 27 February 1937 Poznań, Poland
- Died: 20 September 2023 (aged 86)
- Height: 1.75 m (5 ft 9 in)
- Weight: 70 kg (154 lb)

Sport
- Sport: Sprinting
- Event: 400 metres
- Club: Zawisza Bydgoszcz

Jerzy Władysław Kowalski (27 February 1937 – 20 September 2023) was a Polish sprinter. He competed in the men's 400 metres at the 1960 Summer Olympics. Kowalski died on 20 September 2023, at the age of 86.

== International competitions ==
Year	Competition	Venue	Position	Event	Notes
Representing Poland
1959	World Festival of Youth and Students	Vienna, Austria	1st	200 m	21.4
1959	World Festival of Youth and Students	Vienna, Austria	1st	400 m	48.2
1960	Olympic Games	Rome, Italy	11th (qf)	400 m	46.82
1960	Olympic Games	Rome, Italy	10th (h)	4 × 400 m relay	3:10.88
1962	European Championships	Belgrade, Yugoslavia	3rd (sf)	400 m	46.3
1962	European Championships	Belgrade, Yugoslavia	6th (h)	4 × 400 m relay	3:10.2

== Personal bests ==
- 100 metres – 10.5h (Bydgoszcz 1959)
- 200 metres – 21.0h (Bydgoszcz 1959)
- 400 metres – 46.0h (Łódź 1962)
