= Karl Honz =

German sprinter

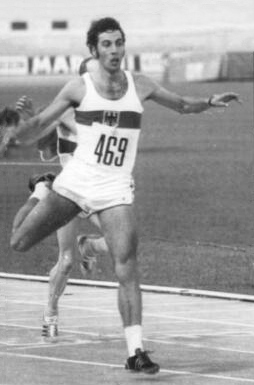
- Honz at the 1974 European Championships

Personal information
- Born: 28 January 1951 (age 75) Bankholzen, Germany
- Height: 1.86 m (6 ft 1 in)
- Weight: 82 kg (181 lb)

Sport
- Sport: Athletics
- Event(s): 200 m, 400 m
- Club: VfB Stuttgart

Achievements and titles
- Personal best(s): 200 m – 20.6 (1973); 400 m – 44.70 (1972)
Medal record
Men's athletics
Representing West Germany
European Championships
Gold medal – first place	1974 Rome	400 m
Silver medal – second place	1974 Rome	4×400 m
European Indoor Championships
Gold medal – first place	1975 Katowice	4×400 m
Silver medal – second place	1973 Rotterdam	4×400 m

Karl Honz (born 28 January 1951) is a retired German sprinter. He held the European record in the 400 metres from 1972 until 1980 with a time of 44.70 s. At the 1972 Summer Olympics he placed seventh in the 400 m and fourth in the 4 × 400 m relay.

Honz was most successful in the European Indoor Championships in Athletics. In the 4 × 400 m relay, he won silver in 1973 in Rotterdam and gold in 1975 in Katowice. In 1974 in Rome, he won gold in the 400 m with a time of 45.04 seconds, ahead of David Jenkins (GB) and Bernd Herrmann, and silver in the 4 × 400 m (with Köhler, Schlöske and Ziegler) with a time of 3:03.52 minutes, behind Great Britain and ahead of France.

In 1972 he became German champion in the 400 m, with a European record time of 44.70 seconds, in front of Bernd Herrmann and Hermann Köhler. He repeated this in 1973, running in 45.60 seconds and finishing in front of Horst-Rüdiger Schlöske and Köhler. In 1974 he placed second behind Herrmann, and in 1975 in third place behind Schlöske and Köhler. In the years 1973 and 1974 he won the German championship in the 4 × 400 m relay with the German team VfB Stuttgart.

With a personal best of 44.70 seconds, he was ranked World No. 2 in 1972 and European No. 6 young athlete of all time in the 400 m. He ranks fourth on the German all-time records for the 400 m.

Records
Preceded by (West Germany) Martin Jellinghaus	European Record Holder Men's 400 m 21 July 1972 – 29 July 1980	Succeeded by (Soviet Union) Viktor Markin
