= Srđan Savić =

Yugoslav sprinter (1931–2020)

Personal information
- Nationality: Yugoslav
- Born: 9 November 1931 Konjič, Yugoslavia
- Died: 17 December 2020 (aged 89)

Sport
- Sport: Sprinting
- Event: 4 × 400 metres relay

Srđan Savić (9 November 1931 – 17 December 2020) was a Yugoslav sprinter. He competed in the men's 4 × 400 metres relay at the 1960 Summer Olympics.
