= Stanisław Swatowski =

Polish sprinter

Personal information
- Nationality: Polish
- Born: 25 March 1934 Michałów, Poland
- Died: 18 February 2008 (aged 73) Warsaw, Poland
- Height: 1.75 m (5 ft 9 in)
- Weight: 72 kg (159 lb)

Sport
- Sport: Sprinting
- Event: 400 metres
- Club: Włókniarz Bielawa; Legia Warsaw

Stanisław Swatowski (25 March 1934 – 18 February 2008) was a Polish sprinter. He competed in the 400 metres at the 1960 Summer Olympics and the 1964 Summer Olympics.

== International competitions ==
Year	Competition	Venue	Position	Event	Notes
Representing Poland
1954	World Student Games	Budapest, Hungary	2nd	4 × 400 m relay	3:14.6
1954	European Championships	Bern, Switzerland	7th (h)	4 × 400 m relay	3:13.1
1955	World Festival of Youth and Students	Warsaw, Poland	2nd	4 × 400 m relay	3:11.8
1958	European Championships	Stockholm, Sweden	6th	400 m	47.8
1958	European Championships	Stockholm, Sweden	6th	4 × 400 m relay	3:13.8
1960	Olympic Games	Rome, Italy	17th (qf)	400 m	47.56
1960	Olympic Games	Rome, Italy	10th (h)	4 × 400 m relay	3:10.88
1962	European Championships	Belgrade, Yugoslavia	6th (h)	4 × 400 m relay	3:10.2
1964	Olympic Games	Tokyo, Japan	31st (h)	400 m	47.6
1964	Olympic Games	Tokyo, Japan	6th	4 × 400 m relay	3:05.3

== Personal bests ==
- 200 metres – 21.2h (Warsaw 1957)
- 400 metres – 46.7h (Łódź 1964)
