= Brahim Karabi =

Tunisian sprinter (1933–2018)

Personal information
- Nationality: Tunisian
- Born: 5 September 1933
- Died: 26 August 2018 (aged 84)

Sport
- Sport: Sprinting
- Event: 400 metres

Brahim Karabi (5 September 1933 – 26 August 2018) was a Tunisian sprinter. He competed in the men's 400 metres at the 1960 Summer Olympics.
