= Christel Schulz =

German athlete

Personal information
- Born: April 6, 1921
- Height: 1.72 m (5 ft 8 in)
- Weight: 5 kg (11 lb)

Sport
- Sport: Athletics
- Event: Long Jump

Christel Schulz was a world record holder in the women's long jump.

== Career ==
Schulz achieved her world record of 6.12 metres on 30 July 1939 in Berlin.

The jump was the first recorded by a woman over 6 metres. It occurred at the ISTAF Berlin meeting. Due to the restrictions of the Second World War, the career of the then 18 year old was severely curtailed.

== See also ==
Christel Schulz profile on World Athletics.
