= Božik =

Božik is a Slovak surname. Notable people with the surname include:

- Mojmír Božík (born 1962), Slovak former ice hockey player
- Rastislav Božik, Slovak football manager
- Rudolf Božik (1920–2000), Slovak fighter pilot and flying ace during World War II

== See also ==
- Bozsik, Hungarianization of the Slovak surname
- Bozek (surname)
