= Vladimir Polyanichev =

Soviet sprinter

Personal information
- Nationality: Soviet
- Born: 21 April 1938 (age 88)

Sport
- Sport: Sprinting
- Event: 4 × 400 metres relay

Vladimir Polyanichev (born 21 April 1938) is a Soviet sprinter. He competed in the men's 4 × 400 metres relay at the 1960 Summer Olympics.
