= Bozek (surname) =

Bozek (Polish: Bożek; Czech: Božek, feminine: Božková) is a Slavic surname. In Czech, it originated as a pet form of the old given names Božetěch, Božemír, etc. Notable people with the surname include:

- Edward Bozek (1950–2022), American épée fencer
- Edward Bożek (born 1937), Polish sprinter
- Henryk Bożek (1924–1994), Polish footballer
- Josef Božek (1782–1835), Czech-Polish engineer and inventor
- Megan Bozek (born 1991), American ice hockey player
- Steve Bozek (born 1960), Canadian ice hockey player

== See also ==
- Božik
