= Hugh Bullard =

Bahamian sprinter

Personal information
- Nationality: Bahamian
- Born: Eucal Hugh Bullard; 16 March 1942 Nassau, Bahamas
- Died: 16 February 2008 (aged 65)

Sport
- Sport: Sprinting
- Event: 400 metres

Eucal Hugh Bullard (16 March 1942 – 16 February 2008) was a Bahamian sprinter. As an athlete, he competed in the men's 400 metres at the 1960 Summer Olympics. He also competed in the 1962 Central American and Caribbean Games, setting a national record men's 4 × 100 metres relay with his teammates.

== Biography ==
Eucal Hugh Bullard was born on 16 March 1942 in Nassau, Bahamas. According to newspaper The Tribune, Bullard was one of the first elite athletics competitors from the Bahamas.

During his sporting career, Bullard was selected to compete for Bahamas at the 1960 Summer Olympics held in Rome, Italy. he competed in the preliminary heats of the men's 400 metres on 3 September in the third heat. He competed against five other athletes. There, he recorded a time of 51.20 seconds and placed last in the heat, failing to advance further. The following year, he was in a race with fellow Bahamian and Olympic sprinter Julian Brown, thus resulting to the first two sub-50 second 400 metres performances ran by a Bahamian athlete.

He then competed at the 1962 Central American and Caribbean Games held in Kingston, Jamaica, in the men's 4 × 100 metres relay. With his team composed of George Collie, Thomas Grant, and Bernard Nottage, they finished third in the semifinals of the event with a time of 41.6 seconds. With this, they set a new national record in the event. After his sporting career, he was the principal of Aquinas College starting in 1978 before being succeeded by Sister Agatha Hunt.

Bullard later died on 16 February 2008 at the age of 65.
