= Zdeněk Váňa =

Czech sprinter

Personal information
- Nationality: Czech
- Born: 7 February 1939 (age 87)

Sport
- Sport: Sprinting
- Event: 400 metres

Zdeněk Váňa (born 7 February 1939) is a Czech sprinter. He competed in the men's 400 metres at the 1960 Summer Olympics.
