= Malcolm Yardley =

British sprinter (1940–2020)

Personal information
- Nationality: British (English)
- Born: 23 December 1940 Oldham, England
- Died: 17 March 2020 (aged 79)
- Height: 170 cm (5 ft 7 in)
- Weight: 65 kg (143 lb)

Sport
- Sport: Athletics
- Event: Sprinting/400m
- Club: Birchfield Harriers

Harold Malcolm Yardley (23 December 1940 – 17 March 2020) was a British sprinter. He competed in the men's 400 metres at the 1960 Summer Olympics.

== Biography ==
Yardley was born in Oldham in 1940 and was raised in Coventry. During World War II, his house was destroyed during the Blitz, with his family moving to Leicester. At school, he played cricket, football and rugby, but excelled at athletics. In 1959, at the age of 18, Yardley made his international debut for Great Britain.

At the 1960 Summer Olympics in Rome, Yardley competed in two events. He was part of the British team that finished fifth in the men's 4 × 400 metres relay, and the men's 400 metres, where he reached the quarter-finals. The following year, along with Adrian Metcalfe, Barry Jackson and Robbie Brightwell, Yardley was part of the number-one ranked 4x400 quartet in the world. However, he missed out on competing at the 1964 Summer Olympics in Tokyo and the 1968 Summer Olympics in Mexico City due to injury.

Yardley was part of the Birchfield Harriers, before moving to the Blackburn Harriers, and gaining selection to compete at the 1970 British Commonwealth Games in Edinburgh. He competed in the men's 400 metres but did not get out of the heats.

Yardley twice finished on the podium at the AAA Championships in the 440 yards event at the 1959 AAA Championships and 1960 AAA Championships. and much later finished runner-up to David Dear in the 200 metres at the 1969 AAA Championships.

Outside of athletics, Yardley was also the captain and manager of Lowerhouse Cricket Club in Burnley. He had training programmes with several local clubs in the North West of England, including Rochdale, Bury and Blackpool. In the late 1960s, Yardley also set up a sports shop in Burnley, with players from the football team coming along.

Yardley died in March 2020 at the age of 79, following a short illness. At the time of his death, he still held the Blackburn Harriers' records in the 100, 200 and 400 metres. Yardley was remembered at the In Memoriam section of the 2020 BBC Sports Personality of the Year Award.
