= Ramon Humbert =

Luxembourgish sprinter (1939–2003)

Personal information
- Nationality: Luxembourgish
- Born: 1 January 1939 Esch-sur-Alzette, Luxembourg
- Died: 22 April 2003 (aged 64)

Sport
- Sport: Sprinting
- Event: 4 × 400 metres relay

Ramon Humbert (1 January 1939 – 22 April 2003) was a Luxembourgish sprinter. He competed in the men's 4 × 400 metres relay at the 1960 Summer Olympics.
