= 2020 BBC Sports Personality of the Year Award =

Sports award in the UK

BBC Sports Personality of the Year
- Date: 20 December 2020
- Location: dock10 studios, Salford
- Country: United Kingdom
- Presented by: BBC
- Hosted by: Gary Lineker; Clare Balding; Gabby Logan; Alex Scott
- Winner: Lewis Hamilton
- Website: BBC Sports Personality

Television/radio coverage
- Network: BBC One; BBC One HD
- Runtime: 120 minutes

The BBC Sports Personality of the Year 2020 took place on 20 December 2020 at the dock10 studios in Salford.

The event was broadcast live on BBC One and hosted by Gary Lineker, Clare Balding, Gabby Logan and Alex Scott.

== Nominees ==
The nominees for the award were revealed on 1 December 2020. On the night of the final, the public were allowed to vote for one of only six pre-selected contenders.

Nominee	Sport	2020 Achievement
Lewis Hamilton	Formula 1	Surpassed Michael Schumacher as the most prolific Grand Prix winner and equalled his record of seven World Drivers' Championships to become the most successful F1 driver in history.
Jordan Henderson	Football	As captain, he led Liverpool to the club's first top-flight league title in 30 years. Also named the FWA Footballer of the Year.
Hollie Doyle	Horse racing	Became the first female jockey to ride five winners on the same British card with an 899/1 quintuple at Windsor Racecourse. Also claimed her first Royal Ascot win on Scarlet Dragon (at 33/1) and surpassed her own record of winners ridden by a British female jockey in a year (now 120).
Stuart Broad	Cricket	Helped England win the Test series against the West Indies and Pakistan, in which he was also the leading wicket taker. In the former, he became the fourth pace bowler (and seventh overall) to take 500 Test wickets and was player of the series.
Ronnie O'Sullivan	Snooker	Won the World Snooker Championship for the sixth time, the fourth player to do so in the modern era (post-1968) . This was his 37th ranking tournament victory, surpassing Stephen Hendry's previous record of 36.
Tyson Fury	Boxing	Became a world heavyweight champion for the second time by handing defending WBC champion Deontay Wilder the first defeat of his career, 14 months after their first bout ended in a draw.

== Controversy ==
This year's Award was cornered by controversy, when the WBC World Heavyweight Champion, Tyson Fury, issued a video on social media politely requesting the BBC remove his name from the nominations for the award: 'This is a message for the @bbcsport and their SPOTY award. Please take me off your list as I'm the people's champion and have no need for verifications or any awards.' The BBC ignored Fury's request. Fury then had his lawyers send the BBC an official letter repeating his request. The BBC did not remove Fury's name from the nominations. Fury requested his fans to respect his wishes and not to vote for him.

== Other awards ==
In addition to the main award as "Sports Personality of the Year", several other awards were also announced:

- Team of the Year: Liverpool F.C.
- Coach of the Year: Jürgen Klopp
- World Sport Star: Khabib Nurmagomedov
- Young Sports Personality of the Year: Andrea Spendolini-Sirieix
- Unsung Hero: Sgt Matt Ratana
- Helen Rollason Award: Captain Sir Tom Moore
- Captain Tom Young Unsung Hero: Tobias Weller
- Expert Special Panel Award: Marcus Rashford

== Performers ==
Artist	Song	Notes
Celeste	"Stop This Flame"	Opening performance
Celeste	"Smile"	In memoriam
Rick Astley	"Every One of Us"	Performed in recognition of the regional SPOTY winners

== In Memoriam ==
The following people were remembered at the ceremony:

- Stirling Moss
- Norman Hunter
- Trevor Cherry
- Willie Thorne
- David Bryant
- Alan Glazier
- Helen Grandon
- Mickey Wright
- Liz Edgar
- Jackie Brown
- Barney Eastwood
- Alan Minter
- Peter Bonetti
- Harry Gregg
- Tony Dunne
- Everton Weekes
- David Capel
- Dean Jones
- Liam Treadwell
- Pat Smullen
- Stan Mellor
- Lucy Kerr
- Bobby Brown
- Marius Zaliukas
- Steve Lee
- Steve Preston
- Mike Renshall
- Helen Yate
- Alex Olmedo
- Angela Buxton
- Mike Slemen
- Matthew Watkins
- Ray Prosser
- Paolo Rossi
- Papa Bouba Diop
- Peter Whittingham
- Jordan Cox
- Frank Myler
- Basil Watts
- Frank Bough
- David Mercer
- Peter Walker
- Kobe Bryant
- Margaret Maughan
- Eric Hall
- Radomir Antic
- Maurice Setters
- Denise Smith
- Tony Rutter
- Joy Rainey
- Neil Black
- Ged Stokes
- Nicolas Portal
- Christophe Dominici
- Raymond Hunter
- Iain Laughland
- Gerard Houllier
- Ray Clemence
- Michael Robinson
- J. J. Williams
- Peter Alliss
- Malcolm Yardley
