= Men's 400 metres European record progression =

The following table shows the European record progression in the men's 400 metres, as ratified by the EAA

== Hand timing ==
Time	Athlete	Nationality	Venue	Date
47.8*	Beauchamp Day	United Kingdom	Perth, Australia	April 1, 1907
47.6	Eric Liddell	United Kingdom	Paris, France	July 12, 1924
46.7	Godfrey Brown	United Kingdom	Berlin, Germany	August 7, 1936
46.0	Rudolf Harbig	Germany	Frankfurt, Germany	August 12, 1939
46.0	Ardalion Ignatyev	Soviet Union	Moscow, Russia	June 25, 1955
45.8	Carl Kaufmann	West Germany	Cologne, Germany	September 19, 1959
45.7	Carl Kaufmann	West Germany	Cologne, Germany	June 15, 1960
45.4	Carl Kaufmann	West Germany	Berlin, Germany	July 24, 1960
44.9	Carl Kaufmann	Germany	Rome, Italy	September 6, 1960
44.9	Martin Jellinghaus	Germany	Mexico City, Mexico	October 17, 1968
44.7	Karl Honz	West Germany	Munich, Germany	July 21, 1972

* Performance timed over 440 yards

== Automatic timing ==
Time	Athlete	Nationality	Venue	Date
44.70	Karl Honz	West Germany	Munich, Germany	July 21, 1972
44.60	Viktor Markin	Soviet Union	Moscow, Russia	July 30, 1980
44.50	Erwin Skamrahl	West Germany	Munich, Germany	July 26, 1983
44.48	Thomas Schönlebe	East Germany	Potsdam, Germany	August 21, 1987
44.33	Thomas Schönlebe	East Germany	Rome, Italy	September 3, 1987
44.26	Matt Hudson-Smith	United Kingdom	Budapest, Hungary	August 22, 2023
