= Jaromír Šlégr =

Czech sprinter

Personal information
- Nationality: Czech
- Born: 19 September 1941 (age 84)

Sport
- Sport: Sprinting
- Event: 4 × 400 metres relay

Jaromír Šlégr (born 19 September 1941) is a Czech sprinter. He competed in the men's 4 × 400 metres relay at the 1960 Summer Olympics.
