= Edgar Davis (sprinter) =

South African sprinter (born 1940)

Personal information
- Nationality: South African
- Born: 2 September 1940 (age 85) Kimberly, South Africa

Sport
- Sport: Sprinting
- Event: 400 metres

Edgar Davis (born 2 September 1940) is a South African sprinter. He competed in the men's 400 metres at the 1960 Summer Olympics.
