= Edward Bożek =

Polish sprinter

Personal information
- Nationality: Polish
- Born: 21 March 1937 (age 89) Tucquegnieux, Meurthe-et-Moselle, France
- Height: 1.77 m (5 ft 10 in)
- Weight: 71 kg (157 lb)

Sport
- Sport: Sprinting
- Event: 400 metres
- Club: Górnik Zabrze

Edward Bożek (born 21 March 1937) is a retired Polish sprinter. He competed in the men's 4 × 400 metres relay at the 1960 Summer Olympics.

== International competitions ==
Year	Competition	Venue	Position	Event	Notes
Representing Poland
1960	Olympic Games	Rome, Italy	10th (h)	4 × 400 m relay	3:10.88

== Personal bests ==
- 200 metres – 21.5h (Sosnowiec 1959)
- 400 metres – 47.5h (Spała 1960)
