= Manfred Poerschke =

German sprinter (1934–2026)

Personal information
- Nationality: German
- Born: 26 February 1934 Dortmund, Gau Westphalia-South, Germany
- Died: 17 August 2026 (aged 92)

Sport
- Sport: Sprinting
- Event: 4 × 400 metres relay
Medal record
Men's athletics
Representing West Germany
European Championships
Silver medal – second place	1958 Stockholm	4×400 m

Manfred Poerschke (also spelled Pörschke; 26 February 1934 – 17 August 2026) was a German sprinter. He competed in the men's 4 × 400 metres relay at the 1956 Summer Olympics. Poerschke died on 17 August 2026, at the age of 92.
