= Nereo Fossati =

Italian sprinter

Personal information
- Nationality: Italian
- Born: 29 March 1937 (age 89) Como, Italy

Sport
- Sport: Sprinting
- Event: 4 × 400 metres relay
Medal record
Representing Italy
Summer Universiade
Silver medal – second place	1959 Turin	4x400m relay

Nereo Fossati (born 29 March 1937) is an Italian sprinter. He competed in the men's 4 × 400 metres relay at the 1960 Summer Olympics.
