= Giuseppe Bommarito =

Italian sprinter

Personal information
- Nationality: Italian
- Born: 3 November 1933 (age 92)

Sport
- Sport: Sprinting
- Event: 400 metres

Giuseppe Bommarito (born 3 November 1933) is an Italian sprinter. He competed in the men's 400 metres at the 1960 Summer Olympics.
