= Felix Heuertz =

Luxembourgish sprinter (born 1935)

Personal information
- Nationality: Luxembourgish
- Born: 20 March 1935 (age 91)

Sport
- Sport: Sprinting
- Event: 400 metres

Felix Heuertz (born 20 March 1935) is a Luxembourgish sprinter. He competed in the men's 400 metres at the 1960 Summer Olympics.
