= Marcel Lambrechts =

Belgian sprinter

Personal information
- Nationality: Belgian
- Born: 4 May 1931 (age 95)

Sport
- Sport: Sprinting
- Event: 400 metres

Marcel Lambrechts (born 4 May 1931) is a Belgian former sprinter. He competed in the men's 400 metres at the 1960 Summer Olympics.
