= Malcolm Spence =

Malcolm Spence may refer to:

- Malcolm Spence (ice hockey) (born 2006), Canadian ice hockey player
- Malcolm Spence (Jamaican athlete) (1936–2017), Jamaican sprinter
- Malcolm Spence (South African athlete) (1937–2010), South African sprinter
