= Edward Jefferys =

South African sprinter (1936–1998)

Personal information
- Nationality: South African
- Born: 7 February 1936 Durban, South Africa
- Died: 27 September 1998 (aged 62)

Sport
- Sport: Sprinting
- Event: 100 metres

Edward Jefferys (7 February 1936 – 27 September 1998) was a South African sprinter. He competed in the men's 100 metres, men's 200 metres and men's 4 x 400 metres relay at the 1960 Summer Olympics. Jeffery finished sixth in the 220 yards and was eliminated in the semi-finals of the 100 yards at the 1958 British Empire and Commonwealth Games.
