= Horst Mann =

German sprinter (1927–2018)

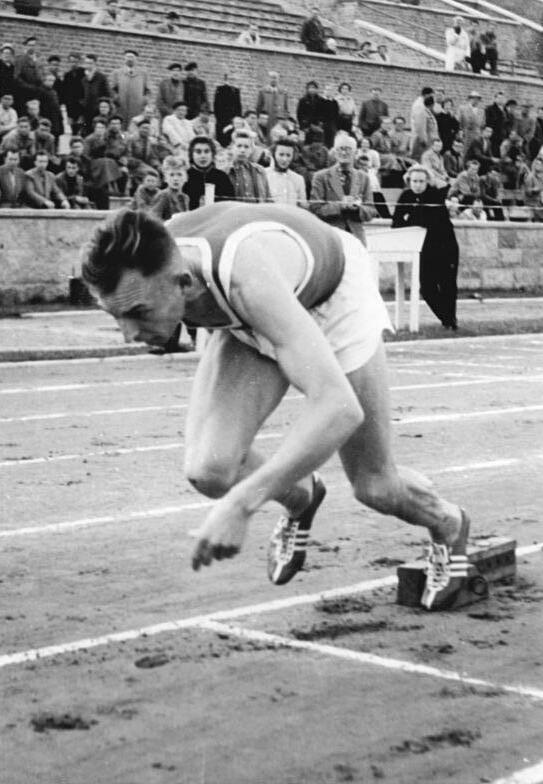
- Horst Mann in 1956

Personal information
- Nationality: German
- Born: 8 July 1927 Neustettin, Weimar Germany (Szczecinek, Poland)
- Died: 15 October 2018 (aged 91)

Sport
- Sport: Sprinting
- Event: 400 metres

Horst Mann (8 July 1927 – 15 October 2018) was a German sprinter. He competed in the men's 400 metres at the 1956 Summer Olympics.
