= Lodewijk De Clerck =

Belgian sprinter (1936–2018)

Personal information
- Nationality: Belgian
- Born: 3 January 1936
- Died: 13 February 2018 (aged 82)

Sport
- Sport: Sprinting
- Event: 400 metres

Lodewijk De Clerck (3 January 1936 – 13 February 2018) was a Belgian sprinter. He competed in the men's 400 metres at the 1960 Summer Olympics.
