= Jack Yerman =

American sprinter

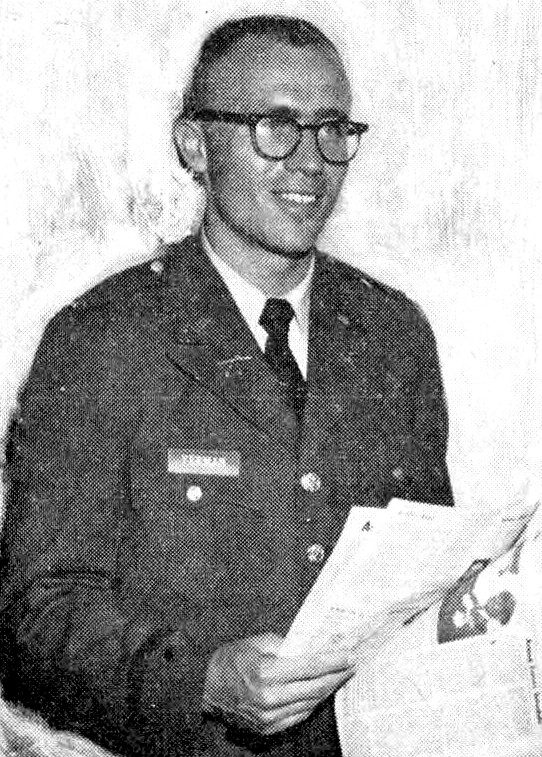
- Yerman, circa 1961

Personal information
- Full name: Jack Lloyd Yerman
- Born: February 5, 1939 (age 87) Oroville, California, U.S.
Medal record
Men's athletics
Representing the United States
Olympic Games
Gold medal – first place	1960 Rome	4 × 400 metres relay

Jack Lloyd Yerman (born February 5, 1939) is an American former athlete and winner of the gold medal in the 4 × 400 m relay at the 1960 Summer Olympics.

Jack Yerman was sixth in the 400 m at the 1959 Pan-American Games and won the silver medal as a member of an American 4 × 400 m relay team.

He won the 1960 U.S. Olympic Trials 400 m at Stanford with a time of 46.3, but at the Olympics itself, he only reached the semifinals. Jack Yerman won a gold medal as the lead-off runner with the American 4 × 400 m relay team and set a new world record of 3:02.2.

Yerman also played fullback for Berkeley in the Rose Bowl. Previously he ran for Woodland High School in Woodland, California, finishing third at the 1956 CIF California State Meet.

Yerman lives in Paradise, California. He is a retired high school teacher and father of four.

He is a Latter-day Saint. Yerman joined the Church of Jesus Christ of Latter-day Saints after his participation in the Olympics.

== World records ==
- Mile Relay
- 1600 Meter Relay
- Two Mile Relay
- Distance Medley Relay
- Indoor 400 Meter short track
- 660 yard sprint (unofficial)

== Major events ==
- Olympic Gold Medal – 1600 meter relay 1960
- Rose Bowl 1960
- Pan American Games

(only Jack Yerman and Bob Mathias have accomplished all three of the above)

- First US-USSR dual meet, 1958
- Two Time Donkey Derby Champion
