= Johannes Kaiser (sprinter) =

German sprinter

Medal record

Men's athletics

Representing Germany

Olympic Games
Silver medal – second place	1960 Rome	4×400 metre

Representing West Germany

European Championships
Silver medal – second place	1958 Stockholm	4×400 m

Johannes "Jo" Kaiser (27 February 1936 in Jüngersdorf, Düren – 17 December 1996 in Zürich, Switzerland) was a West German athlete who competed mainly in the 400 metres.

He competed for the United Team of Germany in the 1960 Summer Olympics held in Rome, Italy in the 4 × 400 metre relay where he won the silver medal with his teammates Joachim Reske, Manfred Kinder and Carl Kaufmann. Sports Illustrated described Kaiser's team, which took second place, as "excellent" and the race as "the most intelligently run, esthetically satisfying race of the Olympics". Kaiser ran his section against Glenn Davis.

The next year, he ran in a competition between West German and American athletes in Stuttgart.

Kaiser died in 1996, at the age of 60. The cause of death was suicide.
