= Renato Panciera =

Italian sprinter

Personal information
- Nationality: Italian
- Born: 8 April 1935
- Died: 15 August 2001 (aged 66)

Sport
- Sport: Sprinting
- Event: 4 × 400 metres relay

Renato Panciera (8 April 1935 – 15 August 2001) was an Italian sprinter. He competed in the men's 4 × 400 metres relay at the 1960 Summer Olympics.
