= Christian Wägli =

Swiss athlete (1934–2019)

Personal information
- Nationality: Swiss
- Born: 22 December 1934 Muri bei Bern
- Died: 17 June 2019 (aged 84)

Sport
- Sport: Sprinting
- Events: 800 metres 4 × 400 metres relay

Christian Wägli (22 December 1934 – 17 June 2019) was a Swiss sprinter and middle-distance runner. He finished fifth in the 800 metres and sixth in the 4 × 400 metres relay at the 1960 Summer Olympics.

He became the Swiss Sports Personality of the Year in 1958. On the same year, he finished eighth in the 800 metres and competed in the 4 × 400 metres relay at the European Championships.

His personal best times were 47.1 seconds in the 400 metres and 1:47.40 minutes in the 800 metres, both achieved in 1960.
