= Lennart Jonsson =

Swedish sprinter (1933–2023)

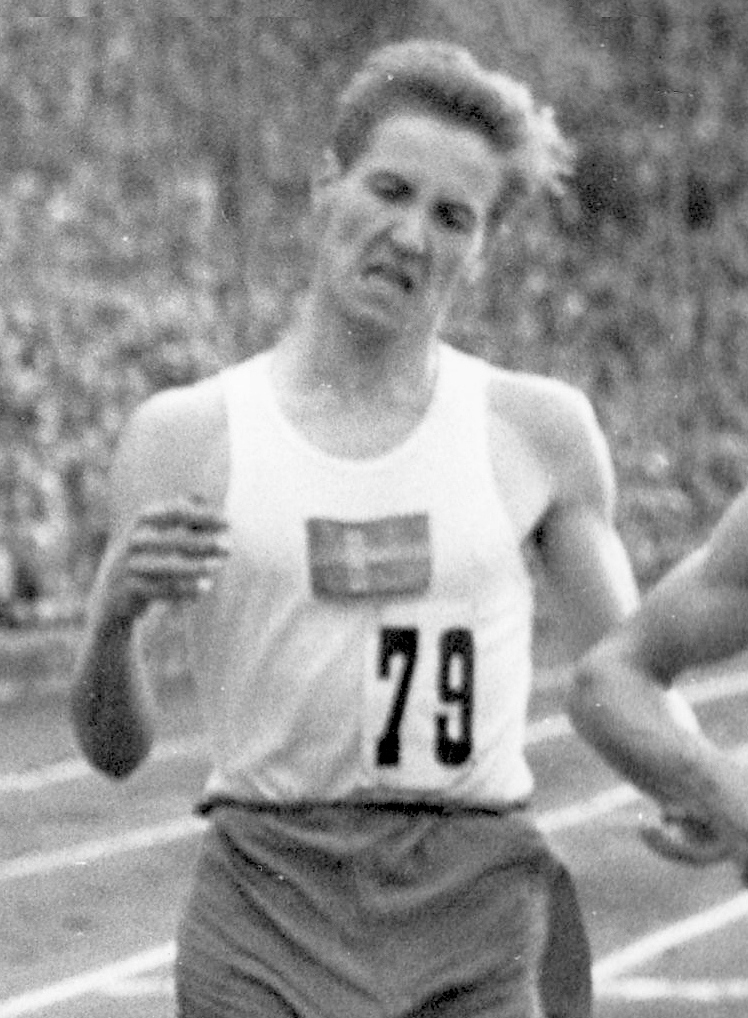
- Jonsson running a relay in 1957

Personal information
- Born: 11 June 1933 Västervik, Sweden
- Died: 1 September 2023 (aged 90) Västerås, Sweden
- Height: 1.82 m (6 ft 0 in)
- Weight: 70 kg (150 lb)

Sport
- Sport: Athletics
- Event: 100–400 m
- Club: IF Udd; SoIK Hellas; Bromma IF

Achievements and titles
- Personal best(s): 100 m – 10.9; 200 m – 21.9 (1960); 400 m – 47.6 (1959)
Medal record
Men's athletics
Representing Sweden
European Championships
| Bronze medal – third place | 1958 Stockholm | 4×400 m |

Helge Lennart Jonsson (11 June 1933 – 1 September 2023) was a Swedish sprinter. He competed in the 200 m and 4 × 400 m relay events at the 1960 Summer Olympics, but failed to reach the finals. He won a bronze medal in the relay at the 1958 European Athletics Championships, as well as the national titles in the 400 m (1959) and 4 × 400 m relay (1958 and 1959). After retiring from competitions he was treasurer of the Swedish Athletics Association for many years. Jonsson died in Västerås on 1 September 2023, aged 90.
