= Alf Petersson =

Swedish sprinter (1933–2024)

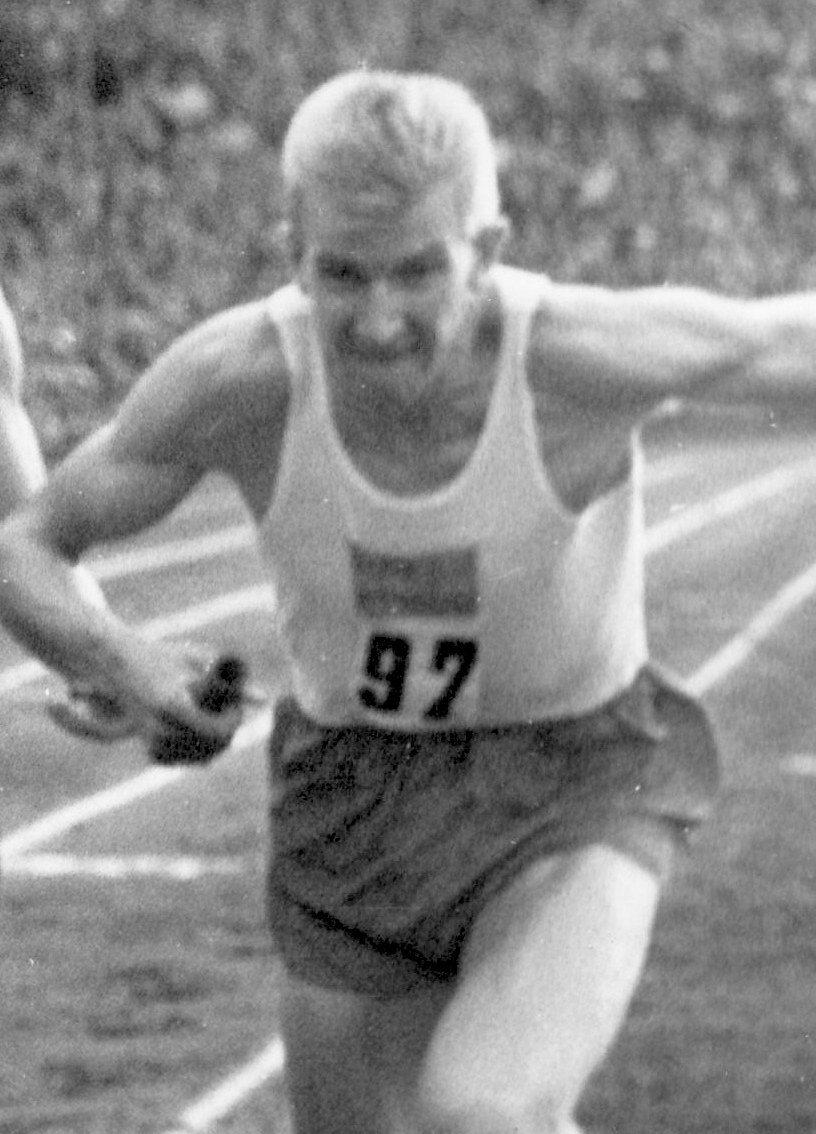
- Petersson running a relay in 1957

Personal information
- Born: 5 February 1933 Helsingborg, Sweden
- Died: 29 March 2024 (aged 91)
- Height: 1.90 m (6 ft 3 in)
- Weight: 80 kg (180 lb)

Sport
- Sport: Athletics
- Event(s): 100–800 m, long jump
- Club: IFK Helsingborg

Achievements and titles
- Personal best(s): 100 m – 11.0; 200 m – 22.0; 400 m – 47.0 (1958); 800 m – 1:50.6; LJ – 7.31 m
Medal record
Men's athletics
Representing Sweden
European Championships
| Bronze medal – third place | 1958 Stockholm | 4×400 m |

Alf Roland Petersson (5 February 1933 – 29 March 2024) was a Swedish sprinter. He died on 29 March 2024, at the age of 91.

== Athletic career ==
Petersson competed in the 400 m and 4 × 400 m relay at the 1960 Summer Olympics, but failed to reach the finals. He finished fifth and third in these events at the 1958 European Athletics Championships.

Petersson started as a long jumper with a personal best of 7.31 m. He then changed to 100–800 m running events, winning the national 400 m title in 1955, 1957–58 and 1960 and setting a national record in 1958 over this distance.
