= Carl Kaufmann =

German sprinter

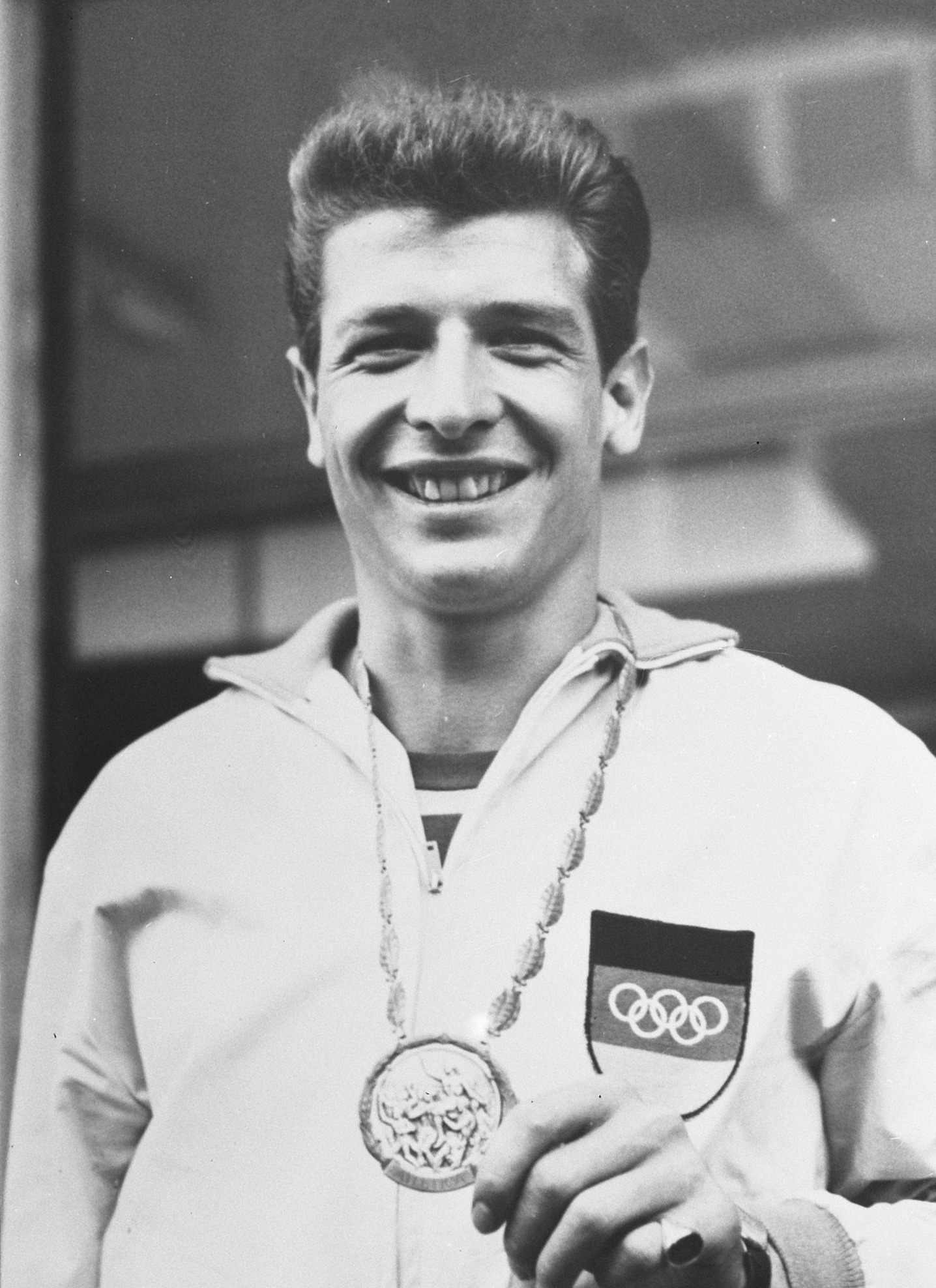
- Kaufmann in 1960

Personal information
- Born: 25 March 1936 Brooklyn, United States
- Died: 1 September 2008 (aged 72) Karlsruhe, Germany
- Height: 1.83 m (6 ft 0 in)
- Weight: 76 kg (168 lb)

Sport
- Sport: Sprint running
- Club: Karlsruher SC
Medal record
Men's athletics
Representing Germany
Olympic Games
Silver medal – second place	1960 Rome	400 m
Silver medal – second place	1960 Rome	4×400 m
Representing West Germany
European Championships
Silver medal – second place	1958 Stockholm	4×400 m

Carl Kaufmann (25 March 1936 – 1 September 2008) was an American born West German sprint runner.

Kaufmann initially specialized in the 200 m, but in 1958 changed to 400 m and won a European silver medal in the 4 × 400 m relay. Between 15 September 1959 and 6 September 1960 he set four European records in 400 metres, reducing the time down to 44.9 s, which remained the record until the 1968 Summer Olympics in Mexico City.

He competed for the United Team of Germany at the 1960 Summer Olympics in the 400 metres and won the silver. The finish line picture of Kaufmann's desperate lunge to try to capture the gold has been shown in many track and field publications. Both Kaufmann and Davis set a new world-record time at 44.9 s and became the first athletes to run the 400 m with 45 seconds. Kaufmann then joined teammates Joachim Reske, Manfred Kinder and Johannes Kaiser in the 4 × 400 m relay, where they won the silver medal.

After retiring from competitions Kaufmann was running an amateur theatre in Karlsruhe, where he died aged 72.

Records
Preceded by (Soviet Union) Ardalion Ignatyev	European Record Holder Men's 400 m 19 September 1959 – 16 October 1968	Succeeded by (West Germany) Martin Jellinghaus
