= Konstantin Grachev =

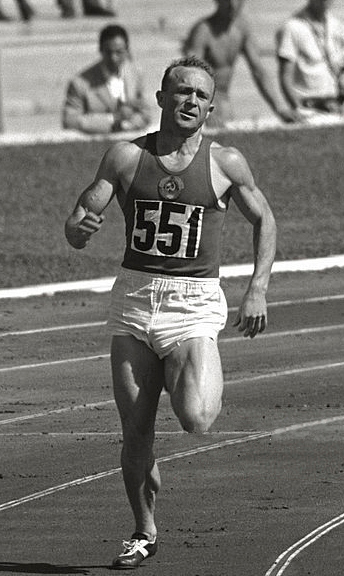
- Konstantin Grachev at the 1960 Summer Olympics

Personal information
- Born: 17 April 1927 Saint Petersburg, Russia
- Died: 4 April 2013 (aged 85)
- Height: 1.66 m (5 ft 5 in)
- Weight: 63 kg (139 lb)

Sport
- Sport: Athletics
- Event: 400 m

Achievements and titles
- Personal best: 400 m – 46.9 (1960)

Konstantin Nikolayevich Grachev (Russian: Константин Николаевич Грачёв; 17 April 1927 – 4 April 2013) was a Russian sprinter. He competed at the 1956 Summer Olympics and 1960 Summer Olympics in the 400 m and 4 × 400 m events, but failed to reach the finals. During his career Grachev won seven Soviet titles and one European title in the 400 m. After retiring from competitions he moved to Dnipropetrovsk, Ukraine. Grachev died on 4 April 2013, at the age of 85.
