= Pentti Rekola =

Finnish sprinter (1934–2012)

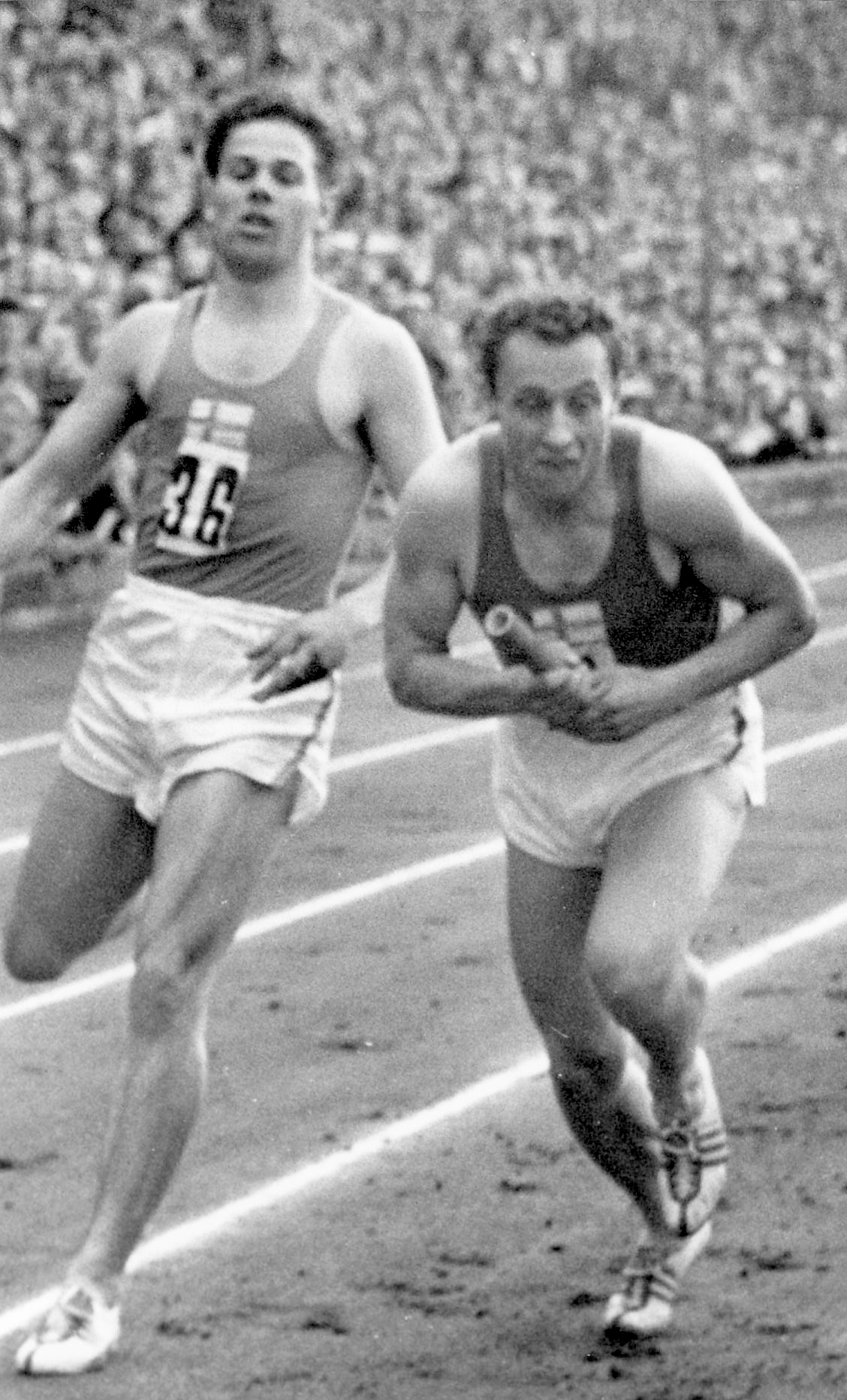
- Pentti Rekola (left) and Voitto Hellstén running a relay in 1957

Personal information
- Born: 13 March 1934 Nakkila, Finland
- Died: 13 September 2012 (aged 78) Turku, Finland
- Height: 1.75 m (5 ft 9 in)
- Weight: 70 kg (150 lb)

Sport
- Sport: Athletics
- Event(s): 200 m, 400 m
- Club: TuTo, Turku

Achievements and titles
- Personal best(s): 200 m – 21.5 (1959); 400 m – 47.4 (1957)

Pentti Jooseppi "Pena" Rekola (13 March 1934 – 13 September 2012) was a Finnish sprinter. He competed in the 200 m and 4 × 400 m relay events at the 1956 and 1960 Summer Olympics, but failed to reach the finals.

Between 1956 and 1962, Rekola took part in 29 international competitions. Domestically, he won the 100 m title in 1956–1958 and 1961, the 200 m and 400 m titles in 1959, the 4 × 100 m relay in 1957 and 1959, and 4 × 400 m relay in 1956–1963. Rekola was a firefighter. His son Harri was the national champion in the 4 × 100 m relay in 1989.
