= Athletics at the 1952 Summer Olympics – Men's 400 metres hurdles =

Men's 400 metres hurdles at the Games of the XV Olympiad
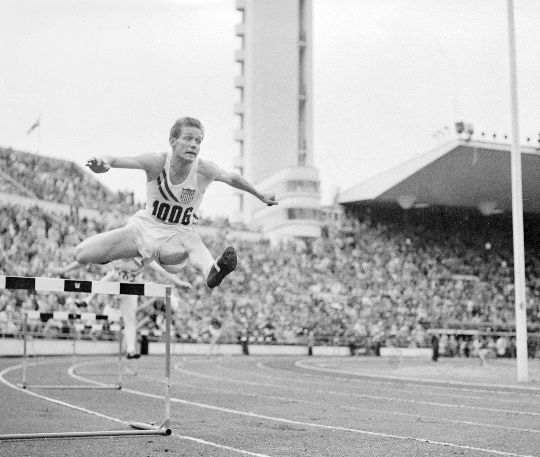
- Charles Moore
- Venue: Helsinki Olympic Stadium
- Dates: July 20, 1952 (heats, quarterfinals); July 21, 1952 (semifinals, final)
- Competitors: 40 from 24 nations
- Winning time: 50.8 =OR

Medalists
1st place, gold medalist(s)		Charles Moore; United States
2nd place, silver medalist(s)		Yuriy Lituyev; Soviet Union
3rd place, bronze medalist(s)		John Holland; New Zealand

Video on YouTube amateur film

The men's 400 metres hurdles event at the 1952 Summer Olympics took place July 20–21, 1952 at the Helsinki Olympic Stadium. There were 40 competitors from 24 nations. The maximum number of athletes per nation had been set at 3 since the 1930 Olympic Congress. The final was won by American Charles Moore. It was the nation's third consecutive and eighth overall victory in the event. The Soviet Union, in its debut, and New Zealand each earned their first medal in the men's 400 metres hurdles, with Yuriy Lituyev's silver and John Holland's bronze, respectively.

== Background ==
This was the 10th time the event was held. It had been introduced along with the men's 200 metres hurdles in 1900, with the 200 being dropped after 1904 and the 400 being held through 1908 before being left off the 1912 programme. However, when the Olympics returned in 1920 after World War I, the men's 400 metres hurdles was back and would continue to be contested at every Games thereafter.

One of the six finalists from the 1948 Games returned: bronze medalist Rune Larsson of Sweden. The favorite was Charles Moore of the United States, the four-time AAU champion and the second man to run the race under 51 seconds. His biggest competition was expected to be Yuriy Lituyev of the Soviet Union.

Iceland, Luxembourg, Portugal, Puerto Rico, the Soviet Union, and Venezuela each made their debut in the event. The United States made its 10th appearance, the only nation to have competed at every edition of the event to that point.

== Competition format ==
The competition expanded to a four-round format from the three-round format used since 1908: heats, quarterfinals, semifinals, and a final. Ten sets of hurdles were set on the course. The hurdles were 3 feet (91.5 centimetres) tall and were placed 35 metres apart beginning 45 metres from the starting line, resulting in a 40 metres home stretch after the last hurdle. The 400 metres track was standard.

There were 8 first-round heats of between 4 and 6 athletes each, with the top 3 hurdlers in each heat advancing to the quarterfinals. There were 4 quarterfinal heats with 6 athletes each. The top 3 men in each quarterfinal advanced to the semifinals. The 12 semifinalists were divided into 2 semifinals of 6 athletes each, with the top 3 in each semifinal advancing to the 6-man final.

== Records ==
Prior to the competition, the existing world and Olympic records were as follows.

World record	Glenn Hardin (USA)	50.6	Stockholm, Sweden	26 July 1934
Olympic record	Roy Cochran (USA)	51.1	London, United Kingdom	31 July 1948

Charles Moore bettered the Olympic record with a time of 50.8 seconds in the first quarterfinal, then matched his own new record in the final.

== Schedule ==
All times are Eastern European Summer Time (UTC+3)

Date	Time	Round
Sunday, 20 July 1952	16:10; 19:25	Heats; Quarterfinals
Monday, 21 July 1952	15:00; 17:40	Semifinals; Final

== Results ==
=== Heats ===
The first round was held on July 20. The three fastest runners from each heat qualified for the quarterfinals.

==== Heat 1 ====
Rank	Athlete	Nation	Time (hand)	Time (automatic)	Notes
1	Charles Moore	United States	51.8	51.92	Q
2	Lars Ylander	Sweden	53.7	53.90	Q
3	Eitaro Okano	Japan	54.2	54.42	Q
4	Rudolf Haidegger	Austria	54.8	54.87	
5	Johny Fonck	Luxembourg	57.8	57.93	
–	José Fórmica	Spain	DNS	–	

==== Heat 2 ====
Rank	Athlete	Nation	Time	Notes
1	Timofey Lunev	Soviet Union	54.3	Q
2	Dewey Lee Yoder Jr	United States	55.2	Q
3	Ken Doubleday	Australia	55.4	Q
4	Muhammad Shafi	Pakistan	56.1	
5	Ingi Þorsteinsson	Iceland	56.5	
–	Zvonko Sabolović	Yugoslavia	DNS	

==== Heat 3 ====
Rank	Athlete	Nation	Time	Notes
1	Anatoly Yulin	Soviet Union	53.6	Q
2	Fotios Kosmas	Greece	53.9	Q
3	Roland Blackman	United States	54.8	Q
4	Ragnar Graeffe	Finland	55.0	
5	Jörn Gevert	Chile	56.1	
6	Emin Doybak	Turkey	56.6	

==== Heat 4 ====
Rank	Athlete	Nation	Time (hand)	Time (automatic)	Notes
1	Yuriy Lituyev	Soviet Union	53.5	53.56	Q
2	Rainer Pelkonen	Finland	54.2	54.32	Q
3	Robert Bart	France	54.5	54.64	Q
4	Pedro Yoma	Chile	56.8	57.03	
5	Paulino Ferrer	Venezuela	1:02.1	–	
–	Samuel Andersón	Cuba	DNS	–	

==== Heat 5 ====
Rank	Athlete	Nation	Time	Notes
1	Ron Wilke	South Africa	54.5	Q
2	Arvo Hilli	Finland	54.6	Q
3	Rune Larsson	Sweden	55.9	Q
4	Mirza Khan	Pakistan	56.3	

==== Heat 6 ====
Rank	Athlete	Nation	Time	Notes
1	John Holland	New Zealand	53.3	Q
2	Sven-Olov Eriksson	Sweden	54.3	Q
3	Angus Scott	Great Britain	54.9	Q
4	Kemal Horulu	Turkey	55.2	
5	Karl Schmid	Switzerland	57.5	

==== Heat 7 ====
Rank	Athlete	Nation	Time	Notes
1	David Gracie	Great Britain	54.2	Q
2	Wilson Carneiro	Brazil	56.0	Q
3	Hans Schwarz	Switzerland	56.3	Q
4	Fernando Fernandes	Portugal	56.8	
5	Doğan Acarbay	Turkey	1:02.8	

==== Heat 8 ====
Rank	Athlete	Nation	Time	Notes
1	Armando Filiput	Italy	53.8	Q
2	Harry Whittle	Great Britain	53.9	Q
3	Antal Lippay	Hungary	54.0	Q
4	Amadeo Francis	Puerto Rico	54.0	
5	Jean Thureau	France	56.7	

=== Quarterfinals ===
The quarterfinals were held on July 20. The three fastest runners from each heat qualified for the semifinals.

==== Quarterfinal 1 ====
Rank	Athlete	Nation	Time (hand)	Time (automatic)	Notes
1	Charles Moore	United States	50.8	50.98	Q, OR
2	Anatoly Yulin	Soviet Union	52.4	52.64	Q
3	Armando Filiput	Italy	53.0	53.00	Q
4	Robert Bart	France	53.0	53.33	
5	Sven-Olov Eriksson	Sweden	53.8	53.96	
6	Hans Schwarz	Switzerland	54.0	54.09	

==== Quarterfinal 2 ====
Rank	Athlete	Nation	Time (hand)	Time (automatic)	Notes
1	John Holland	New Zealand	52.2	52.24	Q
2	Dewey Lee Yoder Jr	United States	53.3	53.40	Q
3	David Gracie	Great Britain	53.9	53.94	Q
4	Arvo Hilli	Finland	54.0	54.28	
5	Fotios Kosmas	Greece	55.3	55.50	
6	Wilson Carneiro	Brazil	59.4	–	

==== Quarterfinal 3 ====
Rank	Athlete	Nation	Time (hand)	Time (automatic)	Notes
1	Yuriy Lituyev	Soviet Union	52.2	52.37	Q
2	Antal Lippay	Hungary	52.7	52.93	Q
3	Harry Whittle	Great Britain	52.8	52.94	Q
4	Lars Ylander	Sweden	53.1	53.29	
5	Ron Wilke	South Africa	54.5	54.76	
6	Ken Doubleday	Australia	1:00.2	–	

==== Quarterfinal 4 ====
Rank	Athlete	Nation	Time (hand)	Time (automatic)	Notes
1	Timofey Lunev	Soviet Union	52.7	52.87	Q
2	Roland Blackman	United States	52.7	52.88	Q
3	Rune Larsson	Sweden	53.3	53.35	Q
4	Angus Scott	Great Britain	53.4	53.69	
5	Rainer Pelkonen	Finland	53.9	54.06	
6	Eitaro Okano	Japan	54.4	54.42	

=== Semifinals ===
The semifinals were held on July 21. The three fastest runners from each heat qualified for the final.

==== Semifinal 1 ====
Rank	Athlete	Nation	Time (hand)	Time (automatic)	Notes
1	Yuriy Lituyev	Soviet Union	51.8	51.90	Q
2	John Holland	New Zealand	52.0	52.22	Q
3	Anatoly Yulin	Soviet Union	52.1	52.28	Q
4	David Gracie	Great Britain	52.4	52.65	
5	Roland Blackman	United States	52.7	52.86	
6	Rune Larsson	Sweden	53.9	54.06	

==== Semifinal 2 ====
Rank	Athlete	Nation	Time (hand)	Time (automatic)	Notes
1	Charles Moore	United States	52.0	52.08	Q
2	Harri Whittle	Great Britain	52.9	52.98	Q
3	Armando Filiput	Italy	53.0	52.98	Q
4	Dewey Lee Yoder Jr	United States	53.0	53.08	
5	Antal Lippay	Hungary	53.0	53.10	
6	Timofey Lunev	Soviet Union	53.1	53.30	

=== Final ===
Rank	Athlete	Nation	Time (hand)	Time (automatic)	Notes
1st place, gold medalist(s)	Charles Moore	United States	50.8	51.06	=OR
2nd place, silver medalist(s)	Yuriy Lituyev	Soviet Union	51.3	51.51	
3rd place, bronze medalist(s)	John Holland	New Zealand	52.2	52.26	
4	Anatoliy Yulin	Soviet Union	52.8	52.81	
5	Harry Whittle	Great Britain	53.1	53.36	
6	Armando Filiput	Italy	54.4	54.49	

== Results summary ==
Rank	Athlete	Nation	Heats	Quarterfinals	Semifinals	Final	Notes
1st place, gold medalist(s)	Charles Moore	United States	51.8	50.8	52.0	50.8	OR
2nd place, silver medalist(s)	Yuriy Lituyev	Soviet Union	53.5	52.2	51.8	51.3	
3rd place, bronze medalist(s)	John Holland	New Zealand	53.3	52.2	52.0	52.2	
4	Anatoliy Yulin	Soviet Union	53.6	52.4	52.1	52.8	
5	Harry Whittle	Great Britain	53.9	52.8	52.9	53.1	
6	Armando Filiput	Italy	53.8	53.0	53.0	54.4	
7	David Gracie	Great Britain	54.2	53.9	52.4	Did not advance	
8	Roland Blackman	United States	54.8	52.7	52.7	Did not advance	
9	Dewey Lee Yoder Jr	United States	55.2	53.3	53.0	Did not advance	
10	Antal Lippay	Hungary	54.0	52.7	53.0	Did not advance	
11	Timofey Lunev	Soviet Union	54.3	52.7	53.1	Did not advance	
12	Rune Larsson	Sweden	55.9	53.3	53.9	Did not advance	
13	Robert Bart	France	54.5	53.0	Did not advance		
14	Lars Ylander	Sweden	53.7	53.1	Did not advance		
15	Angus Scott	Great Britain	54.9	53.4	Did not advance		
16	Sven-Olov Eriksson	Sweden	54.3	53.8	Did not advance		
17	Rainer Pelkonen	Finland	54.2	53.9	Did not advance		
18	Arvo Hilli	Finland	54.6	54.0	Did not advance		
18	Hans Schwarz	Switzerland	56.3	54.0	Did not advance		
20	Eitaro Okano	Japan	54.2	54.4	Did not advance		
21	Ron Wilke	South Africa	54.5	54.5	Did not advance		
22	Fotios Kosmas	Greece	53.9	55.3	Did not advance		
23	Wilson Carneiro	Brazil	56.0	59.4	Did not advance		
24	Ken Doubleday	Australia	55.4	1:00.2	Did not advance		
25	Amadeo Francis	Puerto Rico	54.0	Did not advance			
26	Rudolf Haidegger	Austria	54.8	Did not advance			
27	Ragnar Graeffe	Finland	55.0	Did not advance			
28	Kemal Horulu	Turkey	55.2	Did not advance			
29	Jörn Gevert	Chile	56.1	Did not advance			
29	Muhammad Shafi	Pakistan	56.1	Did not advance			
31	Mirza Khan	Pakistan	56.3	Did not advance			
32	Ingi Þorsteinsson	Iceland	56.5	Did not advance			
33	Emin Doybak	Turkey	56.6	Did not advance			
34	Jean Thureau	France	56.7	Did not advance			
35	Fernando Fernandes	Portugal	56.8	Did not advance			
35	Pedro Yoma	Chile	56.8	Did not advance			
37	Karl Schmid	Switzerland	57.5	Did not advance			
38	Johny Fonck	Luxembourg	57.8	Did not advance			
39	Paulino Ferrer	Venezuela	1:02.1	Did not advance			
40	Doğan Acarbay	Turkey	1:02.8	Did not advance			
