= 1954 European Athletics Championships – Men's 400 metres hurdles =

Men's 400 metres hurdles at the European Athletics Championships

The men's 400 metres hurdles at the 1954 European Athletics Championships was held in Bern, Switzerland, at Stadion Neufeld on 26, 28, and 29 August 1954.

== Medalists ==
Gold	Anatoliy Yulin; Soviet Union
Silver	Yuriy Lituyev; Soviet Union
Bronze	Sven-Oswald Mildh; Finland

== Results ==
=== Final ===
29 August

Rank	Name	Nationality	Time	Notes
1st place, gold medalist(s)	Anatoliy Yulin	Soviet Union	50.5	CR
2nd place, silver medalist(s)	Yuriy Lituyev	Soviet Union	50.8	
3rd place, bronze medalist(s)	Sven-Oswald Mildh	Finland	51.5	NR
4	Guy Cury	France	51.8	
5	Bob Shaw	Great Britain	52.3	NR
6	Antal Lippay	Hungary	52.4	NR

=== Semi-finals ===
28 August

==== Semi-final 1 ====
Rank	Name	Nationality	Time	Notes
1	Anatoliy Yulin	Soviet Union	51.6	Q
2	Guy Cury	France	51.7	Q
3	Sven-Oswald Mildh	Finland	51.8	NR Q
4	Sven Olov Eriksson	Sweden	52.0	
5	Armando Filiput	Italy	52.3	
6	Kurt Bonah	West Germany	53.4	

==== Semi-final 2 ====
Rank	Name	Nationality	Time	Notes
1	Yuriy Lituyev	Soviet Union	52.3	Q
2	Bob Shaw	Great Britain	52.5	Q
3	Antal Lippay	Hungary	52.6	Q
4	Robert Bart	France	52.7	
5	Ilie Savel	Romania	53.3	
6	Lars Ylander	Sweden	54.9	

=== Heats ===
26 August

==== Heat 1 ====
Rank	Name	Nationality	Time	Notes
1	Sven Olov Eriksson	Sweden	53.1	Q
2	Armando Filiput	Italy	54.0	Q
3	Jan Borgersen	Norway	54.8	
4	José Fórmiga	Spain	55.3	

==== Heat 2 ====
Rank	Name	Nationality	Time	Notes
1	Yuriy Lituyev	Soviet Union	51.1	CR Q
2	Kurt Bonah	West Germany	54.0	Q
3	Gerald Wicher	Austria	55.9	
4	Aydin Tunali	Turkey	60.2	

==== Heat 3 ====
Rank	Name	Nationality	Time	Notes
1	Anatoliy Yulin	Soviet Union	52.1	Q
2	Robert Bart	France	52.7	Q
3	Harry Kane	Great Britain	52.7	
4	Karl Borgula	Switzerland	55.3	

==== Heat 4 ====
Rank	Name	Nationality	Time	Notes
1	Bob Shaw	Great Britain	53.4	Q
2	Ilie Savel	Romania	54.0	Q
3	Josef Kost	Switzerland	54.4	
4	Gianfranco Fantuzzi	Italy	55.2	

==== Heat 5 ====
Rank	Name	Nationality	Time	Notes
1	Sven-Oswald Mildh	Finland	53.6	Q
2	Lars Ylander	Sweden	53.8	Q
3	Wolfgang Fischer	West Germany	53.9	
4	Gheorghe Stanel	Romania	55.3	

==== Heat 6 ====
Rank	Name	Nationality	Time	Notes
1	Guy Cury	France	52.9	Q
2	Antal Lippay	Hungary	53.2	Q
3	Dirk Stoclet	Belgium	54.5	
4	Rudolf Haidegger	Austria	55.3	

== Participation ==
According to an unofficial count, 24 athletes from 15 countries participated in the event.

- Austria (2)
- Belgium (1)
- Finland (1)
- France (2)
- Hungary (1)
- Italy (2)
- Norway (1)
- Romania (2)
- Soviet Union (2)
- Spain (1)
- Sweden (2)
- Switzerland (2)
- Turkey (1)
- Great Britain (2)
- West Germany (2)
