= Athletics at the 1956 Summer Olympics – Men's 400 metres hurdles =

Men's 400 metres hurdles at the Games of the XVI Olympiad
- Venue: Melbourne Cricket Ground
- Date: November 23–24, 1956
- Competitors: 28 from 18 nations
- Winning time: 50.1 =OR

Medalists
1st place, gold medalist(s)		Glenn Davis; United States
2nd place, silver medalist(s)		Eddie Southern; United States
3rd place, bronze medalist(s)		Josh Culbreath; United States

Video on YouTube Official Video @11:15

The men's 400 metres hurdles competition at the 1956 Summer Olympics in Melbourne, Australia took place on November 23–24 at the Melbourne Cricket Ground. There were 28 competitors from 18 nations. The maximum number of athletes per nation had been set at 3 since the 1930 Olympic Congress. The event was won by Glenn Davis of the United States, the nation's fourth consecutive and ninth overall victory in the men's 400 metres hurdles. Eddie Southern (silver) and Josh Culbreath (bronze) completed the American sweep, the third time (after 1904 and 1920) that the United States had swept the medals in the event.

== Background ==
This was the 11th time the event was held. It had been introduced along with the men's 200 metres hurdles in 1900, with the 200 being dropped after 1904 and the 400 being held through 1908 before being left off the 1912 programme. However, when the Olympics returned in 1920 after World War I, the men's 400 metres hurdles was back and would continue to be contested at every Games thereafter.

Two of the six finalists from the 1952 Games returned: silver medalist Yuriy Lituyev and fourth-place finisher Anatoliy Yulin, both of the Soviet Union. Earlier in the year, at the U.S. trials, American Glenn Davis had demolished Lituyev's three year old world record, knocking almost a full second off the mark and taking the time under 50 seconds for the first time ever. Eddie Southern was also under 50 seconds in that race. The two young Americans joined Josh Culbreath, the 1953 to 1955 AAU and 1955 Pan American champion, on a strong United States team. Lituyev, as in 1952, was the strongest challenger to the Americans.

Romania made its debut in the event. The United States made its 11th appearance, the only nation to have competed at every edition of the event to that point.

== Summary ==
During the final, the six lanes were fairly even, with Lituyev pushing the backstretch to gain a slight advantage going in to the final turn. That was swallowed up during the turn as Davis surged, leading Eddie Southern and Gert Potgieter off the turn. Davis expanded his lead over Southern from 2 meters to 5 meters down the home stretch for the win. Over the final barrier, Potgieter caught his trail leg on the hurdle which knocked him off balance. He was able to take two more strides then did a face plant in the middle of the track. On the inside, Josh Culbreath was able to cruise by for bronze, completing the American sweep.

== Competition format ==
The competition returned to the three-round format used since 1908 (except the four-round competition in 1952): heats, semifinals, and a final. Ten sets of hurdles were set on the course. The hurdles were 3 feet (91.5 centimetres) tall and were placed 35 metres apart beginning 45 metres from the starting line, resulting in a 40 metres home stretch after the last hurdle. The 400 metres track was standard.

There were 6 heats with between 3 and 6 athletes each. The top 2 men in each heat advanced to the semifinals. The 12 semifinalists were divided into 2 semifinals of 6 athletes each, with the top 3 in each semifinal advancing to the 6-man final.

== Records ==
Prior to the competition, the existing world and Olympic records were as follows.

World record	Glenn Davis (USA)	49.5	Los Angeles, United States	29 June 1956
Olympic record	Charles Moore (USA)	50.8	Helsinki, Finland	20 July 1952

Eddie Southern set a new Olympic record with 50.1 seconds in the first semifinal. Glenn Davis matched that time in the final.

== Schedule ==
All times are Australian Eastern Standard Time (UTC+10)

Date	Time	Round
Friday, 23 November 1956	14:30; 17:40	Heats; Semifinals
Saturday, 24 November 1956	17:10	Final

== Results ==
=== Heats ===
==== Heat 1 ====
Rank	Athlete	Nation	Time (hand)	Time (automatic)	Notes
1	Glenn Davis	United States	51.3	51.33	Q
2	David Lean	Australia	51.4	51.55	Q
3	Keiji Ogushi	Japan	53.2	53.22	
4	Ovidio de Jesús	Puerto Rico	54.0	54.08	
5	Pablo Somblingo	Philippines	54.5	54.66	

==== Heat 2 ====
Rank	Athlete	Nation	Time (hand)	Time (automatic)	Notes
1	Eddie Southern	United States	51.3	51.41	Q
2	Harry Kane	Great Britain	51.8	51.85	Q
3	Geoff Goodacre	Australia	52.5	52.85	
4	Kalim Khawaja Ghani	Pakistan	55.1	55.36	
5	Jagdev Singh	India	55.2	55.36	

==== Heat 3 ====
Rank	Athlete	Nation	Time (hand)	Time (automatic)	Notes
1	Josh Culbreath	United States	50.9	51.06	Q
2	Guy Cury	France	51.6	51.76	Q
3	Jaime Aparicio	Colombia	52.0	52.14	
4	Tom Farrell	Great Britain	52.7	52.88	
5	Muhammad Yaqub	Pakistan	53.1	53.18	
6	Tsai Cheng-Fu	Republic of China	54.6	54.84	

==== Heat 4 ====
Rank	Athlete	Nation	Time (hand)	Time (automatic)	Notes
1	Ross Parker	Australia	53.5	53.51	Q
2	Ioannis Kambadelis	Greece	53.7	53.66	Q
3	Amadeo Francis	Puerto Rico	54.3	54.38	
—	Igor Ilyin	Soviet Union	DNS	—	
—	Helmut Janz	United Team of Germany	DNS	—	
—	Christian Wägli	Switzerland	DNS	—	

==== Heat 5 ====
Rank	Athlete	Nation	Time (hand)	Time (automatic)	Notes
1	Yuriy Lituyev	Soviet Union	51.6	51.69	Q
2	Gert Potgieter	South Africa	52.0	52.05	Q
3	Ossi Mildh	Finland	52.1	52.19	
4	Alexandre Yankoff	France	53.1	53.30	
5	Marcel Lambrechts	Belgium	54.0	54.24	

==== Heat 6 ====
Rank	Athlete	Nation	Time (hand)	Time (automatic)	Notes
1	Anatoliy Yulin	Soviet Union	52.1	52.22	Q
2	Ilie Savel	Romania	52.2	52.31	Q
3	Bob Shaw	Great Britain	52.5	52.62	
4	Ulisses dos Santos	Brazil	53.8	53.99	
—	Josef Kost	Switzerland	DNS	—	

=== Semifinals ===
==== Semifinal 1 ====
Rank	Athlete	Nation	Time (hand)	Time (automatic)	Notes
1	Eddie Southern	United States	50.1	50.26	Q, OR
2	Glenn Davis	United States	50.7	50.78	Q
3	Gert Potgieter	South Africa	51.3	51.30	Q
4	Guy Cury	France	51.5	51.66	
5	Anatoliy Yulin	Soviet Union	51.7	51.79	
6	Ross Parker	Australia	52.6	52.72	

==== Semifinal 2 ====
Rank	Athlete	Nation	Time (hand)	Time (automatic)	Notes
1	Josh Culbreath	United States	50.9	50.97	Q
2	David Lean	Australia	51.4	51.45	Q
3	Yuriy Lituyev	Soviet Union	51.8	51.78	Q
4	Ilie Savel	Romania	52.0	52.06	
5	Harry Kane	Great Britain	52.7	52.95	
6	Ioannis Kambadelis	Greece	53.8	53.93	

=== Final ===
Rank	Athlete	Nation	Time (hand)	Time (automatic)	Notes
1st place, gold medalist(s)	Glenn Davis	United States	50.1	50.29	=OR
2nd place, silver medalist(s)	Eddie Southern	United States	50.8	50.94	
3rd place, bronze medalist(s)	Josh Culbreath	United States	51.6	51.74	
4	Yuriy Lituyev	Soviet Union	51.7	51.91	
5	David Lean	Australia	51.8	51.93	
6	Gert Potgieter	South Africa	56.0	–	

== Results summary ==
Rank	Athlete	Nation	Heats	Semifinals	Final	Notes
1st place, gold medalist(s)	Glenn Davis	United States	51.3	50.7	50.1	=OR
2nd place, silver medalist(s)	Eddie Southern	United States	51.3	50.1	50.8	OR
3rd place, bronze medalist(s)	Josh Culbreath	United States	50.9	50.9	51.6	
4	Yuriy Lituyev	Soviet Union	51.6	51.8	51.7	
5	David Lean	Australia	51.4	51.4	51.8	
6	Gert Potgieter	South Africa	52.0	51.3	56.0	
7	Guy Cury	France	51.6	51.5	Did not advance	
8	Anatoliy Yulin	Soviet Union	52.1	51.7	Did not advance	
9	Ilie Savel	Romania	52.2	52.0	Did not advance	
10	Ross Parker	Australia	53.5	52.6	Did not advance	
11	Harry Kane	Great Britain	51.8	52.7	Did not advance	
12	Ioannis Kambadelis	Greece	53.7	53.8	Did not advance	
13	Jaime Aparicio	Colombia	52.0	Did not advance		
14	Ossi Mildh	Finland	52.1	Did not advance		
15	Geoff Goodacre	Australia	52.5	Did not advance		
15	Bob Shaw	Great Britain	52.5	Did not advance		
17	Tom Farrell	Great Britain	52.7	Did not advance		
18	Alexandre Yankoff	France	53.1	Did not advance		
18	Muhammad Yaqub	Pakistan	53.1	Did not advance		
20	Keiji Ogushi	Japan	53.2	Did not advance		
21	Ulisses dos Santos	Brazil	53.8	Did not advance		
22	Ovidio de Jesús	Puerto Rico	54.0	Did not advance		
22	Marcel Lambrechts	Belgium	54.0	Did not advance		
24	Amadeo Francis	Puerto Rico	54.3	Did not advance		
25	Pablo Somblingo	Philippines	54.5	Did not advance		
26	Tsai Cheng-Fu	Republic of China	54.6	Did not advance		
27	Kalim Khawaja Ghani	Pakistan	55.1	Did not advance		
28	Jagdev Singh	India	55.2	Did not advance		
