= 1950 European Athletics Championships – Men's 400 metres hurdles =

Men's 400 metres hurdles at the European Athletics Championships

The men's 400 metres hurdles at the 1950 European Athletics Championships was held in Brussels, Belgium, at Heysel Stadium on 24, 26, and 27 August 1950.

== Medalists ==
Gold	Armando Filiput; Italy
Silver	Yuriy Lituyev; Soviet Union
Bronze	Harry Whittle; Great Britain

== Results ==
=== Final ===
27 August

Rank	Name	Nationality	Time	Notes
1st place, gold medalist(s)	Armando Filiput	Italy	51.9	CR NR
2nd place, silver medalist(s)	Yuriy Lituyev	Soviet Union	52.4	NR
3rd place, bronze medalist(s)	Harry Whittle	Great Britain	52.7	
4	Ottavio Missoni	Italy	53.6	
5	Lars Ylander	Sweden	53.9	
6	Georges Elloy	France	54.3	

=== Semi-finals ===
26 August

==== Semi-final 1 ====
Rank	Name	Nationality	Time	Notes
1	Harry Whittle	Great Britain	53.1	Q
2	Yuriy Lituyev	Soviet Union	53.1	Q
3	Ottavio Missoni	Italy	53.6	Q
4	Rune Larsson	Sweden	53.6	
5	Yves Cros	France	54.1	
6	Torben Johannesen	Denmark	54.5	

==== Semi-final 2 ====
Rank	Name	Nationality	Time	Notes
1	Armando Filiput	Italy	52.0	CR NR Q
2	Georges Elloy	France	53.2	Q
3	Lars Ylander	Sweden	53.3	Q
4	Timofey Lunev	Soviet Union	53.4	
5	Angus Scott	Great Britain	53.7	
6	Marcel Dits	Belgium	54.0	

=== Heats ===
24 August

==== Heat 1 ====
Rank	Name	Nationality	Time	Notes
1	Yves Cros	France	54.0	Q
2	Ottavio Missoni	Italy	54.2	Q
3	Timofey Lunev	Soviet Union	54.2	Q
4	Kemal Horulu	Turkey	55.1	
5	Fotios Kosmas	Greece	55.7	

==== Heat 2 ====
Rank	Name	Nationality	Time	Notes
1	Armando Filiput	Italy	53.6	Q
2	Georges Elloy	France	54.3	Q
3	Torben Johannesen	Denmark	54.5	Q
4	Franz Fritz	Austria	54.5	
5	Reidar Nilsen	Norway	55.8	

==== Heat 3 ====
Rank	Name	Nationality	Time	Notes
1	Yuriy Lituyev	Soviet Union	53.4	Q
2	Lars Ylander	Sweden	54.0	Q
3	Angus Scott	Great Britain	54.3	Q
4	Jacques De Moor	Belgium	54.8	
5	Doğan Acarbay	Turkey	55.3	
6	Igor Zupančič	Yugoslavia	55.4	

==== Heat 4 ====
Rank	Name	Nationality	Time	Notes
1	Harry Whittle	Great Britain	54.3	Q
2	Marcel Dits	Belgium	54.8	Q
3	Rune Larsson	Sweden	55.2	Q
4	Frans Buys	Netherlands	55.6	

== Participation ==
According to an unofficial count, 20 athletes from 13 countries participated in the event.

- Austria (1)
- Belgium (2)
- Denmark (1)
- France (2)
- Greece (1)
- Italy (2)
- Netherlands (1)
- Norway (1)
- Soviet Union (2)
- Sweden (2)
- Turkey (2)
- Great Britain (2)
- Yugoslavia (1)
