= David Gracie =

Scottish Olympic hurdler (1927–2020)

Personal information
- Nationality: British (Scottish)
- Born: 26 January 1927 Bonnybridge, Scotland
- Died: 26 October 2020 (aged 93) Edinburgh, Scotland
- Height: 166 cm (5 ft 5 in)
- Weight: 63 kg (139 lb)

Sport
- Sport: Track and field
- Event: 400 metres hurdles
- Club: University of Glasgow AC

David Keir Gracie (26 January 1927 – 26 October 2020) was a British hurdler who competed at the 1952 Summer Olympics.

== Biography ==
Gracie was born in Bonny Bridge in 1927 and by the mid 1930’s he had moved with his family to Larkhall, South Lanarkshire. David said that he was always interested in running as he was the best at it in school. When the war came along David enlisted in the Royal Marines and served from 1945-1947. At the conclusion of his service, he took up his studies to become a veterinarian and also wanted to rekindle his love of running and in the autumn of 1948, he knocked on the door of local club Larkhall YMCA Harriers and asked if he could join. He was welcomed in with open arms and began his athletic career and a period which he later stated was one of the happiest in his life.

Gracie’s first taste of competitive running was in the many amateur games that were run at the time, mainly the Police Glasgow, Police Motherwell, Police Hamilton and Police Lanarkshire open athletic meetings running in the 100 and 220 But by his own admission wasn't particularly successful.

The following year Gracie was running at the YMCA games at Alloa He was running in the 100 yards as it was at that time, and he had two false starts meaning he was disqualified so he entered and ran 440 yards which he had never done before and won it. A month later he ran in the Scottish Championships at Hampden and won the 1949 Scottish title.

In 1950 Gracie lost the Scottish Title. By 1951, as well as Larkhall YMCA Harriers he was also competing for his university - Glasgow University, and at the 1951 freshers the champion did not run his own event, so faced with not being able to compete in the 440 yards he decided to compete in the 440 hurdles which he had never attempted in his life but having been the High Jump and Long Jump Champion at Hamilton games that year he thought jumping a 3 foot obstacle shouldn't be an issue for him. He ran the race and not only won it but set a Scottish University Record at the time.

Two weeks later Gracie was running the hurdles again at St Andrews where he won the title with a new Scottish Universities record. A further fortnight later he ran at Hampden in the Scottish Championships won the race and broke a Scottish record that stood since 1927. In the Autumn of that year Gracie discovered that the British Olympic Association had his name down as a probable for the 400m Hurdles in the upcoming Helsinki Olympic Games.

Gracie later recalled that although he was competing more for his university at this time, all of his interests still lay with Larkhall YMCA Harriers and as he knew the harriers didn’t train in hurdles at the time, he enlisted the help of a friend Ian Duncan, apprentice Joiner, who made him a wooden hurdle and he did all of his Olympic training at the Harriers over that.

Gracie finished third behind Harry Whittle in the 440 yards hurdles event at the 1952 AAA Championships and was later confirmed as being picked for the men's 400 metres hurdles in the 1952 Helsinki Olympic Games and in doing so he became the first Larkhall YMCA Harrier Olympian athlete.

In the Games Gracie just missed out on making the final when he finished fourth in his semi-final, being given the same time as the man who finished third. Only 6 athletes progressed to the final, and indeed his fourth-place time was better than that of the second-place athlete in the other semi-final. Only a few weeks earlier at the White City in London he had beaten John Holland of New Zealand, who went on to win the bronze medal at Helsinki in 52.2 seconds.

Shortly after the Olympics, Davie equaled the twenty-year-old UK 400m hurdles record of 52.3 seconds. His time stood as the Scottish record for 18 years, and even today - 70 years after it was set - it still stands not far outside the top twenty in the Scottish all time rankings.

In 1953 he won the World University Games 400m Hurdles title in Dortmund, Germany. He was also part of the GB Quartet who won the silver medals in the 4x400m relay at the same event.

Straddling his great years of '52 and '53, he was a seven times SAAA Champion from 1949 to 1954, either over 440 yards or 440 yards hurdles, and in the same period he was also a four times SAAA finalist. He came closest to winning the latter event when he finished third in 1954, only 0.3 of a second behind the winner Harry Kane. However this performance was not considered good enough by the SAAA to merit selection for that year's Empire Games which were held in Vancouver, Canada - a decision which was noted with regret by the Larkhall YMCA Harriers President in his report at the 1955 Club AGM.

To this day both Gracie’s 400m flat and 400m hurdles times are Larkhall YMCA Harriers Club records; the former has been threatened on a few occasions over the years, but the latter has remained out of sight.

Until his death in late October 2020 Davie lived with his wife Marion and their daughter Susan in Edinburgh for many years and in October 2019

After leaving Larkhall YMCA Harriers, when he moved to Kent to take up his first Veterinary post, he was made an Honorary Life Member and he and his wife Marion attended both the 60th and 75th anniversary presentation dances.

Until the end of his life he retained great and fond memories of his years in the Harriers, and he was a generous benefactor on several occasions.

Gracie died on 26 October 2020 at the age of 93.
