= Ross Parker =

Ross Parker may refer to:

- Murder of Ross Parker, a racially motivated crime shortly after the September 11th terror attacks
- Ross Parker (songwriter) (1914–1974), born Albert Rostron Parker, co-wrote the song "We'll Meet Again"
- Ross Parker (athlete) (born 1935), Australian Olympic hurdler
- Ross Parker (footballer) (born 1949), Australian footballer

== See also ==
- Geoffrey Ross Parker, or Geoff Parker (cricketer)
- Ross (name)
- Parker (disambiguation)
