= Ylander =

Ylander is a Nordic surname. Notable people with the surname include:

- Katri Ylander (born 1985), Finnish singer
  - Katri Ylander (album), her debut album
- Lars Ylander (1928–2010), Swedish sprinter
