= 1999 Rally China =

Motor rally competition

1999 China Rally 555 China Rally 1999
- Host country: China
- Rally base: Huairou
- Dates run: September 17 1999 – September 19 1999
- Length: 385.72 km (239.68 miles)
- Stage surface: Gravel

Statistics
- Crews: 67 at start, 25 at finish

Overall results
- Overall winner: (France) Didier Auriol (France) Denis Giraudet (Japan) Toyota Castrol Team; Toyota Corolla WRC

The 1999 China Rally (officially 555 China Rally) took place from 17 September to 19 September 1999. It was the 11th of 14 races of the 316th World Rally Championship (WRC).

== Overview ==
The 1999 China Rally was the 3rd edition of the rally, the surface was gravel, the road section distance was 1,037.66 km and the total distance was 1,357.24 km. There were 71 entries, 67 starters and 25 finishers, which was 37.3% of the starters.

The rally is the only WRC Rally to be held in China, with the other China Rallies held in other years being APRC events. Ford’s Colin McRae was the pre-tournament favourite to win the rally, having won the first two events in 1997 and 1998.

The winner was Didier Auriol on the 19th win and 47th podium, driving a Toyota Corolla WRC. He and his French crew were dominant in the third and final leg, and set fastest times in five of the six stages, claiming the win with almost a minute gap over Subaru's Richard Burns. The third position was also claimed by a Toyota team, consisting of Carlos Sainz and Luis Moya.

In the final day of the rally, the Hyundai World Rally Team marked their most achievements of the rally, scoring its third one/two victory of the year in the FIA 2-litre World Cup for Manufacturers. Then, it marked the first time the team has scored a top ten overall position and finally Hyundai won the 2-litre manufacturers class of the FIA Asia-Pacific Rally Championship and the drivers' championship. There were 22 stages, with the shortest being 7.00 km (SS4 Tou Dao Xue 1), the longest being 33.07 km (SS6 Zhung Hu Gou Men 2), slowest being 63.21 km/h (SS4 Tou Dao Xue 1) and the fastest being 124.13 km/h (SS13 Si Dao Dian 2). There were 26 penalties in total.

== Background ==
=== Itinerary ===
All dates and times are CST (UTC+8) and the total distance was 385.12km.

Date	Time	No.	Stage name	Distance
Leg 1 — 150.52 km (39%)
17 September	8:19	SS1	Qi Dao He 1	9.03 km
17 September	8:44	SS2	Zhung Hu Gou Men 1 (cancelled)	33.07 km
17 September	10:42	SS3	Da Xi Shan 1	26.16 km
17 September	11:31	SS4	Tou Dao Xue 1	7.0 km
17 September	12:44	SS5	Qi Dao He 2	9.03 km
17 September	13:09	SS6	Zhung Hu Gou Men 2 (cancelled)	33.07 km
17 September	15:07	SS7	Da Xi Shan 2	26.16 km
17 September	15:56	SS8	Tou Dao Xue 2	7.0 km
Leg 2 — 148.14 km (38%)
18 September	8:48	SS9	Si Dao Dian 1	15.94 km
18 September	9:13	SS10	Di Shui Hu 1	12.47 km
18 September	11:29	SS11	Dao De Gou 1	19.78 km
18 September	12:05	SS12	Hei Niu Shan 1	25.88 km
18 September	13:45	SS13	Si Dao Dian 2	15.94 km
18 September	14:10	SS14	Di Shui Hu 2	12.47 km
18 September	16:26	SS15	Dao De Gou 2	19.78 km
18 September	17:02	SS16	Hei Nui Shan 2	25.88 km
Leg 3 — 86.46 km (22%)
19 September	9:00	SS17	Cha Dao Kou 1	7.41 km
19 September	9:51	SS18	Bei Gou 1	19.15 km
19 September	10:19	SS19	Wu Ying Zi 1	16.67 km
19 September	12:16	SS20	Cha Dao Kou 2	7.41 km
19 September	13:07	SS21	Bei Gou 2	19.15 km
19 September	13:35	SS22	Wu Ying Zi 2	16.67 km

=== Entry list ===
Number	Driver	Co-driver
1	(Finland) Mäkinen Tommi	(Finland) Mannisenmäki Risto
2	(Belgium) Loix Freddy	(Belgium) Smeets Sven
3	(Spain) Sainz Carlos	(Spain) Moya Luis
4	(France) Auriol Didier	(France) Giraudet Denis
5	(United Kingdom) Burns Richard	(United Kingdom) Reid Robert
6	(Finland) Kankkunen Juha	(Finland) Repo Juha
7	(United Kingdom) McRae Colin	(United Kingdom) Grist Nicky
8	(Sweden) Rådström Thomas	(United Kingdom) Gallagher Fred
9	(Finland) Rovanperä Harri	(Finland) Pietiläinen Risto
10	(Italy) Liatti Piero	(Italy) Cassina Carlo
11	(Turkey) Isik Volkan	(Turkey) Bodur Erkan
12	(Saudi Arabia) Bakhashab Abdullah	(United Kingdom) Park Michael
13	(Spain) Puras Jesús	(Spain) Martí Marc
14	-	
15	(Uruguay) Trelles Gustavo	(Argentina) Christie Martin
16	(Oman) Al-Wahaibi Hamed	(Australia) Sircombe Tony
17	(Japan) Kataoka Yoshihiro	(Japan) Hayashi Satoshi
18	(Japan) Kamada Takuma	(Malaysia) Oh Allen
19	(Australia) Guest Michael	(Australia) Green David
20	-	-
21	(Japan) Arai Toshihiro	(United Kingdom) Freeman Roger
22	(Japan) Taguchi Katsuhiko	(Malaysia) Teoh Ron
23	(Japan) Konishi Shigeyuki	(Australia) Macneall Glenn
24	(Sweden) Eriksson Kenneth	(Sweden) Parmander Staffan
25	(Japan) Tajima Nobuhiro	Sukosi Visut
26	(United Kingdom) McRae Alister	(United Kingdom) Senior David
27	(Peru) Ferreyros Ramón	(Peru) Saenz Gonzalo
28	(Malaysia) Mazlan Saladin	(Malaysia) Singh Jagdev
29	(Germany) Kahlfuss Michael	(Germany) Bauer Ronald
30	(Japan) Nutahara Fumio	(Japan) Odagiri Noriyuki
31	(China) Lu Ning Jun	(China) Ding Jian Ping
32	(Hong Kong) Chan Chi Wah	(Hong Kong) Tang Po Lin
33	(Hong Kong) Wong Johnny (Yau Kwan)	(Hong Kong) Lou Paulo
34	Font Ferran	(Spain) Sureda Joan
35	(Hong Kong) Sing Fui On	(Hong Kong) Lau Shui Sang
36	(China) Ko Tim Tak	(China) Lee Man Ho
37	(Hong Kong) Chan Yu Ping	(Hong Kong) Siu Yim Fai
38	(China) Tsang Kwok Choi	(China) Lau Kan
39	(China) Chan Kam Cheong	(China) Leung Wai Ping
40	(Japan) Anzawa Takeshi	(China) Chuk Kowk Wai
41	(China) Huang Qingguo	(China) Zhang Wenmin
42	(China) Yao Jindong	(China) Fan Lei
43	-	-
44	(China) Lu Chengyi	(Taiwan) Lai Huan-shan
45	(China) Zhou Yong	(China) Xu Xin
46	(China) Kao Ching Lwan	(China) Chen Chien-O
47	(China) Feng Chun	(China) Lu Hui
48	(China) Ren Zhiguo	(China) Li Jia
49	(Australia) Bates Rick	(United Kingdom) Brittan Jenny
50	(China) Wen Fan	(China) Zhong Guan
51	(United Kingdom) Higgins David	(United Kingdom) Patterson Chris
52	(China) Wang Rui	(China) He Qianjin
53	(China) Jin Xin	(China) Tan Xiaoqiang
54	(China) Hu Xian	(China) Li Xiaojing
55	-	-
56	(China) Yan Zhongmin	(China) Xie Cheng
57	(Sweden) Hamréus Tommy	(Sweden) Wallin Andreas
58	(China) Xue Lei	(China) Niu Yefang
59	(China) Xing Ming	(China) Xing Liang
60	(China) Cai Ming	(China) Zhu Chenguang
61	(United Kingdom) Shaw Sabrina	(China) Xu Shouli
62	(China) Tang Guangren	(China) Wang Li
63	(China) Zeng Tao	(China) Zhuang Jia
64	(China) Lin Jiang	(China) Mei Jiangbang
65	(China) Wu Zhuang	(China) Zhang Jian
66	(China) Wang Dapeng	(China) Chen Yongqun
67	(China) Bai Jian	(China) Fu Hailun
68	(China) Zhang Hongjiang	(China) Sun Hui
69	(China) Yang Hong	(China) Zheng Rong
70	(China) Kwok Ngal Cho	(China) Tse Ying Wai
71	(China) Lin Jiaxue	(China) Liu Shuanquan

== Results ==
=== Final Results ===
Position	Number	Driver	Co-driver	Car
1	4	(France) Didier Auriol	(France) Denis Giraudet	Toyota Corolla WRC
2	5	(United Kingdom) Richard Burns	(United Kingdom) Robert Reid	Subaru Impreza WRC 99
3	3	(Spain) Carlos Sainz Sr.	(Spain) Luis Moya	Toyota Corolla WRC
4	6	(Finland) Juha Kankkunen	(Finland) Juha Repo	Subaru Impreza WRC 99
5	9	(Finland) Harri Rovanperä	(Finland) Risto Pietiläinen	SEAT WRC
6	11	(Turkey) Volkan Isik	(Turkey) Erkan Bodur	Toyota Corolla WRC
7	21	(Japan) Toshihiro Arai	(United Kingdom) Roger Freeman	Subaru Impreza WRX
8	15	(Uruguay) Gustavo Trelles	(United Kingdom) Martin Christie	Mitsubishi Lancer Evo V
9	22	(Japan) Katsuhiko Taguchi	(Singapore) Ron Teoh	Mitsubishi Lancer Evo VI
10	26	(United Kingdom) Alister McRae	(United Kingdom) David Senior	Hyundai Coupé Kit Car Evo2
11	24	(Sweden) Kenneth Eriksson	(Sweden) Steffan Parmander	Hyundai Coupé Kit Car Evo2
12	19	(United Kingdom) Michael Guest	(United Kingdom) David Green	Subaru Impreza WRX
13	32	(Hong Kong) Chi Wah Chan	(Hong Kong) Po Lin Tang	Mitsubishi Lancer Evo V
14	28	(Malaysia) Mazlan Saladin	(Malaysia) Jagdev Singh	Proton Wira 4WD
15	29	(United Kingdom) Alister McRae	(United Kingdom) David Senior	Hyundai Coupé Kit Car Evo2
16	33	(Hong Kong) Johnny Wong	(Hong Kong) Paulo Lou	Subaru Impreza WRX
17	42	(China) Jindong Yao	(China) Lei Fan	Mitsubishi Lancer Evo III
18	41	(China) Qingguo Huang	(China) Wenmin Zhang	Mitsubishi Lancer Evo III
19	50	(China) Fan Wen	(China) Guan Zhong	Peugeot 106 Rallye
20	37	(Hong Kong) Yu Ping Chan	(Hong Kong) Yim Fai Siu	Subaru Impreza 555
21	58	(China) Lei Xue	(China) Yefang Niu	Peugeot 106 Rallye
22	56	(China) Zhongmin Yan	(China) Cheng Xie	Peugeot 106 Rallye
23	66	(China) Dapeng Wang	(China) Yongqun Chen	Peugeot 106 Rallye
24	62	(China) Guangren Tang	(China) Li Wang	Peugeot 106 Rallye
25	61	(China) Sabrina Shaw	(China) Shouli Xu	Peugeot 106 Rallye
