= Lee Yoder =

American athlete (1930–2023)

Dewey Lee Yoder
Personal information
- Born: Dewey Lee Yoder Jr; July 18, 1930 Philadelphia, United States
- Died: May 17, 2023 (aged 92)

Sport
- Sport: Track and field
- Event: 400 metres hurdles

Dewey Lee Yoder Jr (July 18, 1930 – May 17, 2023) was an American hurdler, known as Lee Yoder. Yoder attended Mercersburg Academy as a youth, where he trained under Jimmy Curran. He came second in the 400 metres hurdles at the 1952 US Olympic trials, beaten only by eventual gold medalist Charles Moore (also from Mercersburg). He competed in the 400 metres hurdles at the 1952 Summer Olympics.

Running for the University of Arkansas, Yoder finished second at the 1952 NCAA Track and Field Championships behind Bob Diviney from Kansas. Yoder later played field hockey, including as part of the bronze medal winning American team at the 1967 Pan American Games. He was manager for the United States field hockey team at the 1984 Olympics.
