= Yankoff =

Yankoff may refer to:

- Alexandre Yankoff (1931–2015), French hurdler
- Colson Yankoff (born 2000), American football player
