= Brad Herzog =

American author and freelance writer (born 1968)

Brad Herzog (born 1968) is an American author and freelance writer. His work includes children's books, American travel memoirs, other works of fiction and nonfiction, and magazine articles for publications including Sports Illustrated, Writer's Digest, and the Cornell Alumni Magazine.

== Personal life ==
Born and raised in Deerfield, Illinois, Herzog obtained a degree in psychology from Cornell University in 1990. After 18 months as a sports reporter for The Ithaca Journal in Ithaca, New York, he returned to Chicago and worked as a freelance writer. In 1995, he purchased a recreational vehicle and traveled through 48 states in 10 months, a journey which he chronicled in his first travel book, States of Mind.

== Writing career ==
Herzog has written freelance articles on a range of topics from civil rights and sports car racing to Pez and Zen, contributing to magazines such as Sports Illustrated, Writer's Digest, Via Magazine, and Carmel Magazine. He has been a contributing editor for Cornell Alumni Magazine since 1991.

=== Children's books ===
Since 2003, Herzog has written 18 children's books for Sleeping Bear Press, including a series of alphabet books about baseball, football, soccer, golf, stock car racing, extreme sports, the Olympic Games, American diversity and the environment.

Other notable children's books written by Herzog include Murphy’s Ticket: The Goofy Start and Glorious End of the Chicago Cubs Billy Goat Curse; Francis and Eddie, about the famous 1913 U.S. Open golf championship in which a then-unknown local named Francis Ouimet (and his 10-year-old caddie) triumphed over the world's best golfers; the Count on Me Sports series recounting true sports stories that reflect positive attributes like courage, perseverance, and, sportsmanship; and One Hurdle at a Time, which he co-authored with 1952 U.S. Olympic gold medalist Charles Moore.

=== Travel ===
Herzog has published four travel memoirs focusing on his exploration of life lessons in small-town America. Herzog's first travel memoir, States of Mind, he turns a figurative search for elusive qualities into a literal and allegorical search with essays on 18 small towns and their eponymous virtues.

In 2004, Herzog published his second travel memoir, Small World, a post 9/11 examination of the state of the union and the ties that bind. Once again, he examined the country's tiniest hamlets, from Rome (Oregon) and Athens (New York) to Jerusalem (Arkansas) and Calcutta (West Virginia).

Herzog's third travel book, Turn Left at the Trojan Horse: A Would-be Hero's American Odyssey, is a cross-country version of the ancient Greek epics, chronicling a trek to his college reunion in Ithaca. In the book, he re-imagines the ancient journey of Odysseus, visiting locales on the U.S. map with names like Troy (Oregon), Sparta (Wisconsin), and Iliad (Montana).

In 2020, Herzog self-published his fourth travelogue, Detour 2020: A Cross-Country Drive Through America’s Wrong Turns, which examines the dramatic angst and division in America during Covid and leading up to the 2020 presidential election.

==== The Millionaire phenomenon ====
In March 2000, Herzog appeared as a contestant on the ABC prime-time game show Who Wants to Be a Millionaire, winning $64,000 and having the chance to discuss his travel memoir States of Mind with host Regis Philbin. Within 24 hours of the episode airing, Herzog's book vaulted from No. 122,040 to No. 2 on Amazon's top-sellers list, which led to mentions in Time, People, and the New York Post and an appearance on NBC's Today Show.

=== Other non-fiction ===
Herzog's first published book for adults was The Sports 100: The One Hundred Most Important People in U.S. Sports History, which profiled and ranked the most influential figures in transforming and transcending sports. In 2014, Herzog co-authored My Mantelpiece: A Memoir of Survival and Social Justice the memoirs of Carolyn Goodman. Goodman's son, Andrew, was one of three civil rights volunteers murdered by the KKK in Mississippi while trying to register Black voters during the Freedom Summer of 1964. Herzog, with illustrator Zachary Pullen, also created a pair of coffee table books about U.S. presidents (The Presidents), and celebrated scientists and inventors (The Thinkers).

== TEDx Talks ==
Herzog gave a TEDx Talk in 2013 called "Catching Creative Ideas," which has garnered over 450,000 views on YouTube and was named one of "10 Great TED Talks for Writers." He presented a second TEDx Talk in 2023 titled "Write the Wrong Way" at Wesleyan University.

== Awards ==
Herzog's writing awards include the CASE Circle of Excellence from the Council for Advancement and Support of Education, a 2011 Teacher's Choice Award, and an IPPY award as one of the year 2000's "10 Outstanding Books of the Year" for his travel memoir States of Mind.

== Books ==
Travel memoirs:

- Detour 2020
- Turn Left at the Trojan Horse
- Small World
- States of Mind

Other adult nonfiction

- My Mantelpiece: A Memoir of Survival and Social Justice
- The Sports 100: The One Hundred Most Important People in American Sports History
- The Presidents
- The Thinkers

Children's titles with Sleeping Bear Press:

- W is for Welcome: A Celebration of America's Diversity
- Murphy's Ticket
- W is for Wrigley: The Friendly Confines Alphabet
- G is for Gold Medal: An Olympic Alphabet
- I Spy with My Little Eye Baseball
- Little Baseball
- Little Football
- Little Basketball
- Little Soccer
- Full Count: A Baseball Number Book
- S is for Save the Planet: A How-to-be Green Alphabet
- A is for Amazing Moments: A Sports Alphabet
- E is for Extreme: An Extreme Sports Alphabet
- R is for Race: A Stock Car Alphabet
- P is for Putt: A Golf Alphabet
- T is for Touchdown: A Football Alphabet
- H is for Home Run: A Baseball Alphabet
- K is for Kick: A Soccer Alphabet

=== Other children's titles ===
- Spacepedia
- One Hurdle at a Time
- Francis and Eddie
- Inspiring Stories of Sportsmanship
- Incredible Stories of Courage in Sports
- Powerful Stories of Perseverance in Sports
- Remarkable Stories of Teamwork in Sports
- Awesome Stories of Generosity in Sports

Children's titles with Sports Illustrated Kids:

- Dare to Be Different
- The 20 Greatest Athletes of the 20th Century
- The 50 Greatest Athletes of Today
- Heads Up!
- MVP Sports Puzzles
- Hot Summer Stars
- Olympics 2000
- 2000: A Celebration of Sports
- Hoopmania
- Seventh Inning Stretch

Children's titles with educational publisher Rigby:

- Freddy in the Fridge
- The Monster's New Friend
- The Runaway Ball
- The Hero in the Mirror
