= Athletics at the 1954 British Empire and Commonwealth Games – Men's 440 yards hurdles =

Men's 440 yards hurdles at the Commonwealth Games
- Venue: Empire Stadium
- Dates: 1 and 4 August

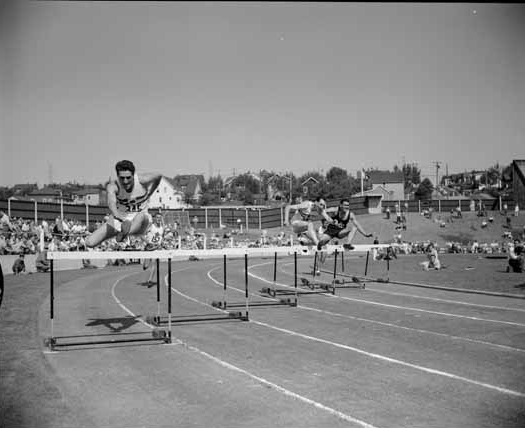
The 440 yards hurdles at the games. Attribution:Province newspaper

The men's 440 yards hurdles event at the 1954 British Empire and Commonwealth Games was held on 1 and 4 August at the Empire Stadium in Vancouver, Canada.

== Medalists ==
Gold	Silver	Bronze
David Lean; Australia	Harry Kane; England	Bob Shaw; Wales

== Results ==
=== Heats ===
Qualification: First 3 in each heat (Q) qualify directly for the final.

Rank	Heat	Name	Nationality	Time	Notes
1	1	David Lean	Australia	52.3	Q
2	1	Bob Shaw	Wales	53.8	Q
3	1	David Fleming	New Zealand	53.8	Q
4	1	Keith Holmes	Canada	54.1	
5	1	John McRoberts	Canada	56.8	
6	1	Korigo Barno	Kenya	57.2	
1	2	Harry Kane	England	53.3	Q
2	2	Ken Wilmshurst	England	55.4	Q
3	2	Murray Gaziuk	Canada	56.2	Q
4	2	Alfred Brown	Southern Rhodesia	56.3	
5	2	Mirza Khan	Pakistan	57.2	
	2	Keith Gardner	Jamaica	DNS	

=== Final ===
Rank	Name	Nationality	Time	Notes
1st place, gold medalist(s)	David Lean	Australia	52.4	GR
2nd place, silver medalist(s)	Harry Kane	England	53.3	
3rd place, bronze medalist(s)	Bob Shaw	Wales	53.3	
4	David Fleming	New Zealand	53.9	
5	Murray Gaziuk	Canada	55.5	
6	Ken Wilmshurst	England	56.3	
