= Eddie Southern =

American hurdler and sprinter (1938–2023)

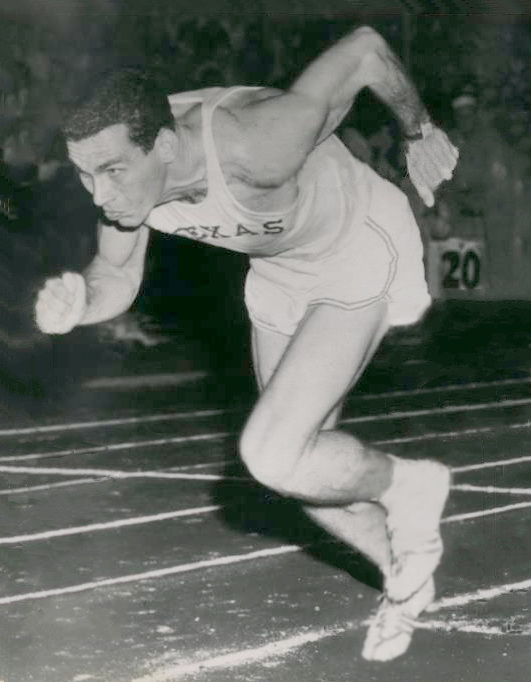
- Southern in 1958

Personal information
- Nickname: Fast Eddie
- Born: Silas Edward Southern; January 4, 1938 Dallas, Texas, U.S.
- Died: May 17, 2023 (aged 85)
- Height: 6 ft 0.5 in (1.842 m)
- Weight: 179 lb (81 kg)

Sport
- Country: United States
- Sport: Athletics
- Events: Sprint, hurdles
- College team: Texas Longhorns
- Coached by: Clyde Littlefield

Achievements and titles
- Personal bests: 100 yd – 9.5 (1958); 220 yd – 20.5 (1958); 400 m – 45.5 (1958); 110 mH – 14.1 (1957); 400 mH – 49.7 (1956)
Medal record
Men's athletics
Representing the United States
Olympic Games
| Silver medal – second place | 1956 Melbourne | 400 m hurdles |
Pan American Games
| Silver medal – second place | 1959 Chicago | 4×400 m |

Silas Edward Southern (January 4, 1938 – May 17, 2023) was an American sprinter and hurdler who won a silver medal in the 400 metres hurdles at 1956 Olympics. He won another silver medal in the 4 × 400 m relay at the 1959 Pan American Games.

== Early life ==
Southern was a 1955 graduate of Dallas' Sunset High School, where he won four individual State Championships and set two State and National High School Records, was an American athlete who competed mainly in the 400 meter hurdles, as well as sprints and relays. He was clocked at 20.7 seconds in the 220-yard dash, best ever by a high-school student in Texas or any other state. Then he turned right around and broke the state and national records in the 440-yard event with a time of 47.2 seconds.

== College ==
Southern went on to compete in track & field at the University of Texas, where he was 1959 NCAA 440 yard champion and a member of World Record 440 and 880 yard relay teams. Running for Clyde Littlefield at the University of Texas, Southern led the Longhorns to Southwest Conference titles from 1957 to 1959. Individually, he earned three straight 440-yard SWC championships in 1957, 1958, 1959 and the 1959 NCAA quarter-mile title. Southern ran the anchor for the world-record 440 and 880-yard relays while at University of Texas.

== International career ==
Southern competed at the 1956 Summer Olympics in the 400 meter hurdles, where he won the silver medal. As an 18-year-old, Southern as a Texas youth set the Olympic Record in the 400 metres hurdles (50.1 seconds) in the semifinals in 1956 at Melbourne on his way to taking the silver medal to fellow American Glenn Davis's gold. Southern won another silver medal in the 4 × 400 m relay at the 1959 Pan American Games.

== Death ==
Southern died on May 17, 2023, at the age of 85.

== Honors ==
In 1956, Southern was inducted into the Friar Society, the oldest honor society at The University of Texas, which recognizes students who made significant contributions to The University of Texas. The Friar Society's purpose is "to associate together leading members of the senior or graduate classes for mutual benefit and cooperation, and to promote the best interests of the University and the student body."

Southern was inducted into the Texas Track and Field Coaches Association Hall of Fame (2013), Sunset High School Hall of Fame, and Drake Relays Athletes Hall of Fame.

Southern was selected 345th overall in the 29th round of the 1959 NFL draft by the Chicago Bears, but did not play in the league.
