= Paulino Ferrer =

Venezuelan hurdler

Personal information
- Born: 9 December 1926 Cabimas, Venezuela
- Died: 27 April 2013 (aged 86) Acarigua, Venezuela

Sport
- Sport: Track and field
- Event: 400 metres hurdles

Paulino Ferrer (9 December 1926 – 27 April 2013) was a Venezuelan hurdler. He competed in the men's 400 metres hurdles at the 1952 Summer Olympics.
