= Johny Fonck =

Luxembourgish athlete

Jean "Johny" Fonck (November 30, 1920 – July 17, 2008) was a Luxembourgish athlete who competed at the 1952 Summer Olympics in Helsinki. Competing in two events, he failed to advance beyond the first round in either the 110 or 400 metres hurdles events. He also played football as a midfielder, and appeared one time for the Luxembourg national team in 1940. He later worked as a manager. In July 2008 he was promoted to the rank of Chevalier in the Order of Merit of the Grand Duchy of Luxembourg and died later that month at the age of 87.
