= Jimmy Curran =

Athletics coach (1880–1963)

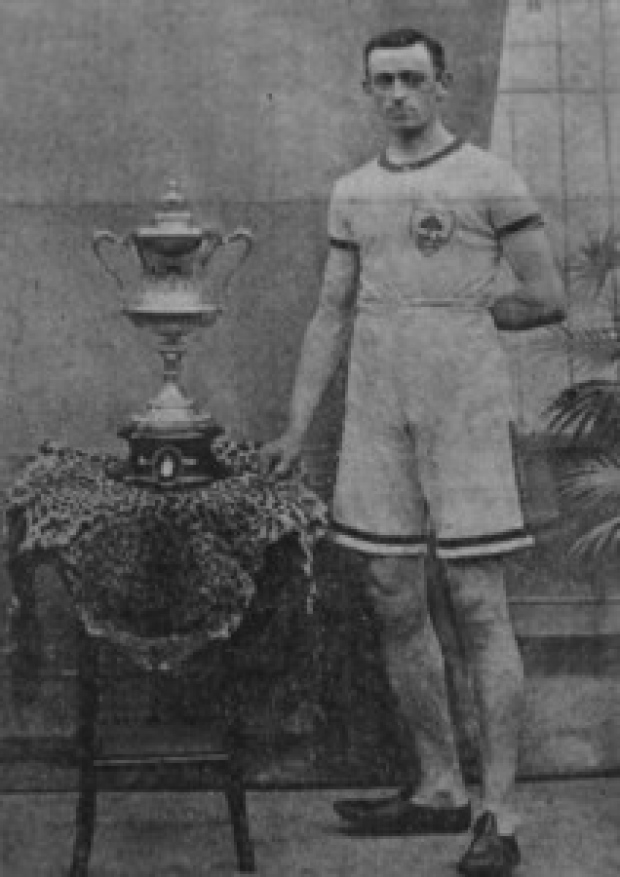
- Curran after winning the Border Mile Championship in 1903
- Born: James Michael Curran; January 7, 1880; Galashiels, Scotland
- Died: February 7, 1963 (aged 83); Chambersburg, Pennsylvania, U.S.
- Occupation: Athletics coach
- Spouse: Janet
- Children: 5

James Michael Curran (January 7, 1880 – February 7, 1963) was an athletics coach who trained and coached five Olympic gold medalists. From 1900-1902, he fought with the Highland Light Infantry in the Second Boer War, serving much of that time under Major General Sir Hector MacDonald.

While based at Port Elizabeth after hostilities had ended, he discovered the sprinter Wyndham Halswelle. After the war, Curran trained Halswelle, who went on to compete in the 1906 Intercalated Games in Athens, and at the 1908 Summer Olympics in London, winning silver and bronze medals at the former, and a controversial gold at the latter.

== Athletic career ==
On returning to Scotland Curran won the prestigious Hawick Border Mile Championship, competing as an amateur for the Gala Harriers. In 1905 he became a professional, running under the name G. Gordon, and continued as such until emigrating to the United States in 1907.

Curran arrived in the United States aboard the RMS Lusitania, on only its second voyage. The journey saw it win the Blue Riband for achieving the fastest westbound crossing of the Atlantic. Amongst those celebrating this achievement on board were the concert pianist Mark Hambourg, and actor and comedian Bransby Williams. Curran continued to run professionally on arrival in the United States, including running as part of relay teams against Alfie Shrubb. He was managed/promoted by a number of former athletes, most notably the former Olympic 100m finalist Arthur Duffey. After losing his job as a puddler's assistant in the Reading Iron Works due to the Panic of 1907, he soon found work as a rubber under the University of Pennsylvania's legendary coach Mike Murphy. He also worked alongside George Orton and Mike Dee. In 1910 Murphy proposed Curran as the track and field coach of Mercersburg Academy, a prep school in southern Pennsylvania. In the summer months of the 1910s Curran would often accept outside work. He worked as coach of John Wanamaker's progressive Meadowbrook Club in Philadelphia, from 1914-c1920. In 1913 a Canadian athletics coach, Walter Knox, offered him a job as one of the coaches of the British athletics team for the 1916 Summer Olympics in Berlin. This employment fell through due to the onset of the First World War.

== Coaching career ==
Curran coached at Mercersburg Academy for 51 years. In that time he coached four more Olympic champions - Ted Meredith, Allen Woodring, Bill Carr, and Charles Moore. In addition, he also trained a number of additional Mercersburg athletes who competed at various Olympics, most notably Harry Goelitz, Barney Berlinger, Bill Cox, George Hester, Dewey Lee Yoder, and Rolando Cruz, as well as Larry Shields and Harold Barron at the Meadowbrook Club. Notably, the two athletes he considered to be the finest he ever trained - Albert Robinson and Henry Thresher - never made it to the Olympic Games. Jimmy Stewart, Dick Foran, and John Payne, all notable actors, played minor roles in Curran's athletic teams, as did the sons of President Calvin Coolidge, John and Calvin Jr. Stewart would send a telegram of condolence to the family upon Curran's death.

In the late 1950s, he was celebrated at the Penn Relays in Philadelphia for having attended 50 meets in a row, including three as rubber and assistant coach with the University of Pennsylvania, and 47 as head coach with Mercersburg Academy.

== Personal life ==
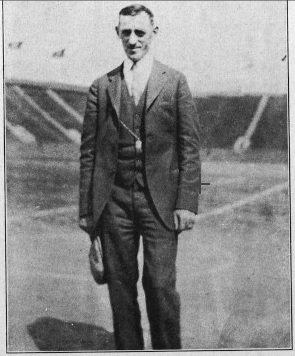
Jimmy Curran at Franklin Field, Philadelphia

Curran married Janet Mabon in 1907, and the couple had five children. Through his wife he was related to the Scottish runner Eric Liddell, and the American professional golfer Scott Hoch. He died of a heart attack on February 7, 1963.
