= Jean Thureau =

French hurdler (1927–1995)

Personal information
- Nationality: French
- Born: 22 June 1927 Vierzon, France
- Died: 3 March 1995 (aged 67) Gassin, France

Sport
- Sport: Track and field
- Event: 400 metres hurdles

Jean Thureau (22 June 1927 – 3 March 1995) was a French hurdler. He competed in the men's 400 metres hurdles at the 1952 Summer Olympics.
