= Arvo Hilli =

Finnish hurdler (1930–2024)

Personal information
- Full name: Arvo Juhani Hilli
- Nationality: Finnish
- Born: 4 August 1930 Padasjoki, Finland
- Died: 17 April 2024 (aged 93)

Sport
- Sport: Track and field
- Event: 400 metres hurdles

Arvo Juhani Hilli (4 August 1930 – 17 April 2024) was a Finnish hurdler. He competed in the men's 400 metres hurdles at the 1952 Summer Olympics. Hilli died on 17 April 2024, at the age of 93.
