= Carolyn Goodman (psychologist) =

American psychologist and civil rights advocate

- Born: Carolyn Elizabeth Drucker; October 6, 1915; Woodmere, New York, U.S.
- Died: August 17, 2007 (aged 91); Manhattan, New York City, U.S.
- Education: Cornell University; City University of New York; Teachers College, Columbia University (EdD)
- Children: Andrew Goodman
- Scientific career
- Fields: Clinical psychology, civil rights activism
- Workplaces: Andrew Goodman Foundation
- Thesis: A study of psychological factors in different fertility and family planning types (1968)
- Doctoral advisor: Arleen Otto
- Other academic advisors: Morton Deutsch

Carolyn Elizabeth Goodman (née Drucker; October 6, 1915 – August 17, 2007) was an American clinical psychologist who became a prominent civil rights advocate after her son, Andrew Goodman and two other civil rights workers, James Chaney and Michael Schwerner, were murdered by the Ku Klux Klan in Neshoba County, Mississippi, in 1964.

Politically active until age 90, Goodman came to wide public attention again in 2005. Traveling to Philadelphia, Mississippi, she testified at the murder trial of Edgar Ray Killen, a former Klan leader recently indicted in the case. On June 21, 2005, the 41st anniversary of the killings, a jury acquitted Killen of murder but found him guilty of manslaughter in the deaths of Goodman, Chaney, and Schwerner.

== Early life and education ==
Goodman was born in Woodmere, New York, and earned a bachelor's degree from Cornell University in 1936 and a master's in clinical psychology from the City University of New York in 1953. She completed a doctorate in education from Teachers College, Columbia University in 1968. Her dissertation was titled A study of psychological factors in different fertility and family planning types. Arleen Otto was her doctoral advisor and Morton Deutsch served on her dissertation committee.

== Career ==
She focused on early intervention for those at risk of psychiatric problems; she ran the PACE Family Treatment Center in the Bronx.

== Activism ==
As a student, she helped to organize farmers’ co-operatives in New York; she later supported the Joint Anti-Fascist Refugee Committee.

After she married Robert W. Goodman, the couple's apartment became a haven for progressive artists and intellectuals. In the 1950s, the Goodmans were deeply involved in the fight against McCarthyism; Alger Hiss was a guest on occasion.

In 1999 she was arrested for protesting the death of Amadou Diallo.

=== Murders ===
In 1964, her son Andrew, then a student at Queens College, told his parents he planned to go to Mississippi. "It wasn't easy for us ... But we couldn't talk out of both sides of our mouths. So I had to let him go", she told The New York Times in 2005.

Andrew Goodman, James Chaney and Michael Schwerner were in Mississippi in May 1964. On June 21, 1964, they travelled to Longdale to investigate the burning of Mount Zion Church; they never returned. Their bodies were found almost two months later.

In 1967, a federal jury in Meridian, Mississippi, convicted seven Klansmen of conspiracy in the deaths of the three civil rights workers. None served more than six years.

In January 2005, Edgar Ray Killen, who in 1967 had been released due to a hung jury, was arrested and charged with murder by the State of Mississippi; he was convicted of manslaughter and died in prison. At his trial, Goodman read a postcard her son wrote on June 21, 1964, the last day of his life

"Dear Mom and Dad," it read, "I have arrived safely in Meridian, Miss. This is a wonderful town, and the weather is fine. I wish you were here. The people in this city are wonderful, and our reception was very good. All my love, Andy."

I still feel that I would let Andy go to Mississippi again ... [E]ven after this terrible thing happened to Andy, I couldn't make a turnabout of everything I believe in.

— C. Goodman in a 1965 interview with The New York Times)

=== Andrew Goodman Foundation ===
In 1966, Carolyn and her husband Robert established the Andrew Goodman Foundation, which supports a variety of social causes. After Carolyn's death in August 2007, David Goodman, Andrew's younger brother, and Sylvia Golbin Goodman, David's wife, took up the work of the Foundation. In 2025, both are on the Board of Directors, which is chaired by Sonia Jarvis.

On the 50th anniversary of Andrew's death, the foundation officially launched Vote Everywhere, which is a national, non-partisan, civic engagement movement of student leaders and university partners. The program is crafted to follow in the footsteps of Andrew Goodman with its mission rooted in tackling impediments to voter registration and other social justice issues on college campuses.

== Personal life ==
She married Robert W. Goodman, a civil engineer, in the late 1930s, and they had three sons, Jonathan, David and Andrew. Robert Goodman died of a stroke in 1969, aged 54.

She married Joseph Eisner in 1972; he died in 1992.

Goodman, who had suffered a series of strokes and seizures in the weeks before her death, died of natural causes in Manhattan, aged 91. At her death, she was assistant clinical professor emeritus of psychiatry at Albert Einstein College of Medicine of Yeshiva University in The Bronx. She was surrounded by her sons Jonathan and David, grandchildren and great-grandchildren. A memorial service was held on October 7, 2007, in Manhattan.

== Selected works ==
- My Mantelpiece: A Memoir of Survival and Social Justice by Carolyn Goodman (with Brad Herzog), Why Not Books; ISBN 978-0-98499-194-5.
