= Ingi Þorsteinsson =

Icelandic athlete (1930–2006)

Personal information
- Full name: Þórarinn Ingi Þorsteinsson
- Born: 24 February 1930 Reykjavík, Kingdom of Iceland
- Died: 23 March 2006 (aged 76) Fossvogur, Reykjavík, Iceland
- Education: University of Iceland
- Spouse: Fjóla Þorvaldsdóttir
- Children: 2
- Basketball career

Career history
- 195?–1957: Gosi
- 1957–196?: KFR

Sport
- Sport: Track, basketball

Þórarinn Ingi Þorsteinsson (24 February 1930 – 23 March 2006) was an Icelandic multi-sport athlete and businessman. As a track athlete, he specialized in hurdling and sprinting and participated in the 1952 Summer Olympics in Helsinki in the 110 meter hurdles, 400 meter hurdles and 4 x 100 meter relay. He later became the chairman of the Icelandic Athletic Federation.

Outside of tracks, he was one of the pioneers in basketball in Iceland and was a member of the first Iceland men's national basketball team.

Ingi graduated from the University of Iceland with a business degree in 1953 and the next 10 years he worked at his fathers wholesaling business. He later was involved in the founding of a clothing factory before going to work for the Imperial Chemicals International in 1969. In 1970, he became the general manager of National Textile Industries Corporation Ltd. (NATEX) in Tanzania.

Þórarinn was born in Reykjavík on 24 February 1930. He died in Fossvogur on 23 March 2006, aged 76.
