= Karl Schmid (athlete) =

Swiss hurdler

Personal information
- Nationality: Swiss
- Born: 23 July 1921

Sport
- Sport: Track and field
- Event: 400 metres hurdles

Karl Schmid (born 23 July 1921) is a Swiss hurdler. He competed in the men's 400 metres hurdles at the 1952 Summer Olympics.
