= Roland Blackmon =

American hurdler

Personal information
- Nationality: American
- Born: November 3, 1928 New Orleans, Louisiana, U.S.
- Died: May 4, 2017 (aged 88)

Sport
- Sport: Track and field
- Event: 400 metres hurdles

Roland Blackmon (November 3, 1928 – May 4, 2017) was an American hurdler. He competed in the men's 400 metres hurdles at the 1952 Summer Olympics.

Blackman's hometown was New Orleans, Louisiana, and he was in the United States Army Signal Corps stationed in Nuremberg, Germany at the time he competed in the Olympics. He was also a boxer. He died in 2017.
