= Barney Berlinger =

American decathlete (1908–2002)

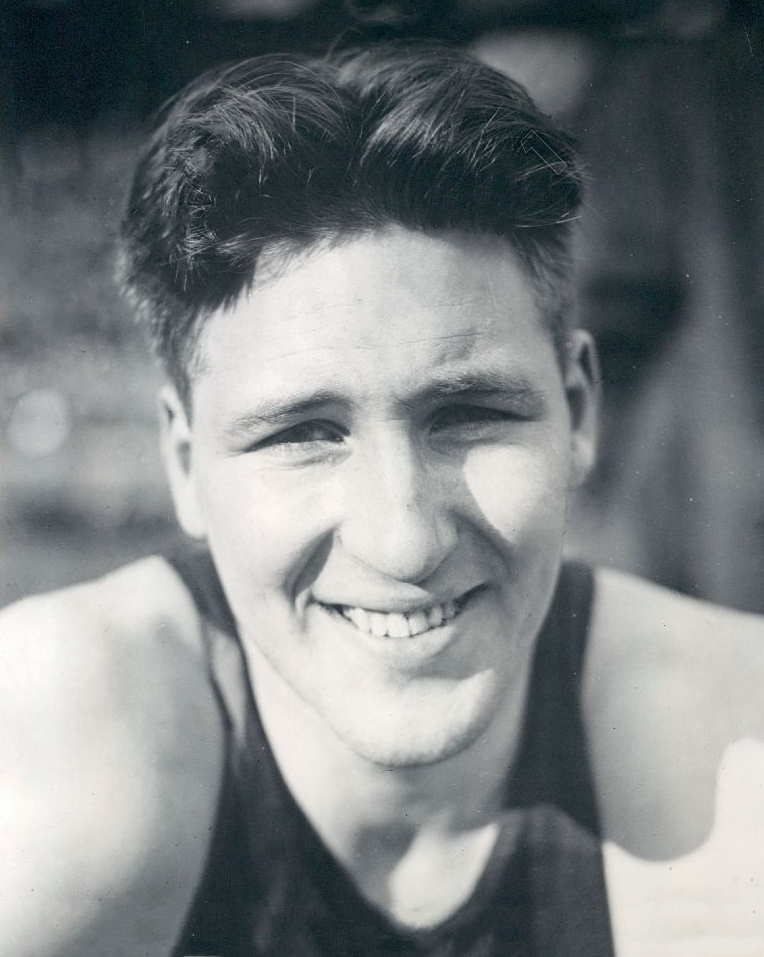
- Berlinger in 1933

Personal information
- Born: Bernard Ernst Berlinger; March 13, 1908 Philadelphia, Pennsylvania, U.S.
- Died: December 2, 2002 (aged 94) Carversville, Pennsylvania, U.S.
- Height: 6 ft 1 in (1.85 m)
- Weight: 201 lb (91 kg)

Sport
- Sport: Athletics
- Event: Decathlon
- College team: Penn Quakers

Achievements and titles
- Personal best(s): HJ – 1.88 m (1930); PV – 4.17 m (1931); SP – 15.15 m (1931); Decathlon – 7,735 (1931)

Bernard Ernst "Barney" Berlinger (March 13, 1908 – December 2, 2002) was an American decathlete. He competed in the 1928 Summer Olympics and won the James E. Sullivan Award in 1931.

== Sports career ==
Barney Berlinger was a multi-sport athlete in high school, attending William Penn Charter School and later Mercersburg Academy, where he was coached by the Scots American trainer Jimmy Curran. In addition to competing in many track and field events, he played both football and basketball and dabbled in wrestling, boxing and baseball. At the University of Pennsylvania, however, coached by Lawson Robertson, he started focusing on track and field and especially decathlon.

Berlinger pulled a tendon at the 1928 Penn Relays, but recovered to place third at the Olympic Trials later that summer with 7362 points. As the top four were selected, that was enough to make the Olympic team. In the Olympic decathlon, however, he only scored 6619 points and placed 17th.

Berlinger won the first of three consecutive Penn Relays decathlons in 1929 – his achievement being recognized by the decathlon trophy being retired. He broke the meeting record on each of those occasions; in 1930 he scored 7460 points, his new personal best. Later that year he became national champion in the non-Olympic pentathlon.

Berlinger became the Penn Quakers' team captain in 1931, his senior year. He won the Penn Relays decathlon for a third and final time that year, his tally of 7735 points being only 49 short of Ken Doherty's American record. He was one of nine American star athletes sent on a goodwill tour of South Africa that summer, and he broke the all-comers records there in several events. Despite only finishing fifth at the national championships, Berlinger still topped the vote for that year's James E. Sullivan Award; he was the first track and field athlete to receive the award, as golfer Bobby Jones had won the inaugural award the previous year.

Berlinger missed most of the 1932 indoor season due to an injured back. That summer he concentrated on starting his business career, deciding not to try out for a place at the Olympic Games in Los Angeles; however, he resumed training the following winter. At the start of the year in March 1933, Berlinger staged his comeback after the disappointments of 1932, by beating the defending Olympic decathlon champion Jim Bausch in a head-to—head 'septathlon' contest indoors at Madison Square Gardens in New York City. He won his only national decathlon title in 1933 with a score of 7597 despite jogging through the final event, 1500 meters, so slowly (7:03.1) that he received no points at all.

Due to his versatility and key roles in his teams, Berlinger was at times called a "one-man track team". In high school, he did indeed win Mercersburg a team title by himself. He remained active in the sport even after retiring from competition for good; in 1936 he returned to the University of Pennsylvania as a deputy for the injured Robertson, and after World War II he worked as an instructor for Army coaches in Europe. In 1952, he was honored by President Dwight D. Eisenhower by being nominated as a special emissary in the president's People-to-People Sports Program.

== Later life ==
Berlinger graduated from Penn in 1931 with a degree in economics.

Berlinger started working for Quaker City Gear Works, a family-owned gear company, in 1932. He remained with the company for the rest of his professional life, eventually retiring as its president in 1978. He died of heart failure at his home in Carversville, Pennsylvania, in 2002 and was survived by his wife, Marguerite, as well as two children and seven grandchildren. His son, Barney Jr., was a top college football player at the University of Pennsylvania where he captained Penn's first formal Ivy League championship team in 1959.

During his working life, Berlinger was issued with several patents, for example one for 'continuous shaft brake for fishing reels' in 1940.

== Accolades and awards ==
In 1931, Berlinger was awarded the James E. Sullivan Award for being judged the outstanding amateur American sportsman that year.

The same year he was awarded the title of the United States best amateur athlete by the National Sportswriters Association.

In 1996, Berlinger was inducted as a member of the inaugural class in the Penn Athletics Hall of Fame. His son, Barney Berlinger Jr. was also inducted in the same class.
