= Rainer Pelkonen =

Finnish hurdler

Personal information
- Nationality: Finnish
- Born: 19 April 1928 (age 98) Kuopio, Finland

Sport
- Sport: Track and field
- Event: 400 metres hurdles

Rainer Pelkonen (born 19 April 1928) is a Finnish hurdler. He competed in the men's 400 metres hurdles at the 1952 Summer Olympics.

In 2009, Pelkonen became a two-time World Veteran Athletics Champion in the 80-year-old men's category.
