= Hans Schwarz (athlete) =

Swiss hurdler (1924–2010)

Personal information
- Nationality: Swiss
- Born: Jean Schwarz; 4 September 1924
- Died: 25 March 2010 (aged 85)

Sport
- Sport: Track and field
- Event: 400 metres hurdles

Jean "Hans" Schwarz (4 September 1924 – 25 March 2010) was a Swiss hurdler. He competed in the men's 400 metres hurdles at the 1952 Summer Olympics. Schwarz died on 25 March 2010, at the age of 85.
