= Ilie Savel =

Romanian hurdler

Personal information
- Nationality: Romanian
- Born: 25 August 1927 Bucești, Galați, Romania
- Died: 16 December 2015 (aged 88)
- Height: 177 cm (5 ft 10 in)
- Weight: 64 kg (141 lb)

Sport
- Sport: Track and field
- Event: 400 metres hurdles

Ilie Savel (25 August 1927 – 16 December 2015) was a Romanian hurdler. He competed in the men's 400 metres hurdles at the 1956 Summer Olympics. He reached the semi-final but did not qualify for the final.

Savel finished second behind Bob Shaw in the 440 yards hurdles event at the British 1955 AAA Championships and won the event at the 1956 AAA Championships.
