= Ron Wilke =

South African sprinter

Personal information
- Nationality: South African
- Born: 17 January 1927 Johannesburg, South Africa
- Died: 5 March 2015 (aged 88)

Sport
- Sport: Sprinting
- Event: 4 × 400 metres relay

Ron Wilke (17 January 1927 – 5 March 2015) was a South African sprinter. He competed in the men's 4 × 400 metres relay at the 1952 Summer Olympics.
