= Muhammad Shafi (athlete) =

Pakistani sprinter

Personal information
- Nationality: Pakistani
- Born: 18 February 1928

Sport
- Sport: Sprinting
- Event: 4 × 400 metres relay

Muhammad Shafi (born 18 February 1928) is a Pakistani sprinter. He competed in the men's 4 × 400 metres relay at the 1952 Summer Olympics.
