= Antal Lippay =

Hungarian hurdler

Personal information
- Nationality: Hungarian
- Born: 7 September 1923
- Died: 24 February 2003 (aged 79)

Sport
- Sport: Track and field
- Event: 400 metres hurdles

Antal Lippay (7 September 1923 – 24 February 2003) was a Hungarian hurdler. He competed in the men's 400 metres hurdles at the 1952 Summer Olympics.
