= Ross Parker (athlete) =

Australian hurdler

Personal information
- Nationality: Australian
- Born: 31 October 1935 (age 90)

Sport
- Sport: Track and field
- Event: 400 metres hurdles

Ross Parker (born 31 October 1935) is an Australian hurdler. He competed in the men's 400 metres hurdles at the 1956 Summer Olympics.
