= Sven-Olov Eriksson =

Swedish runner

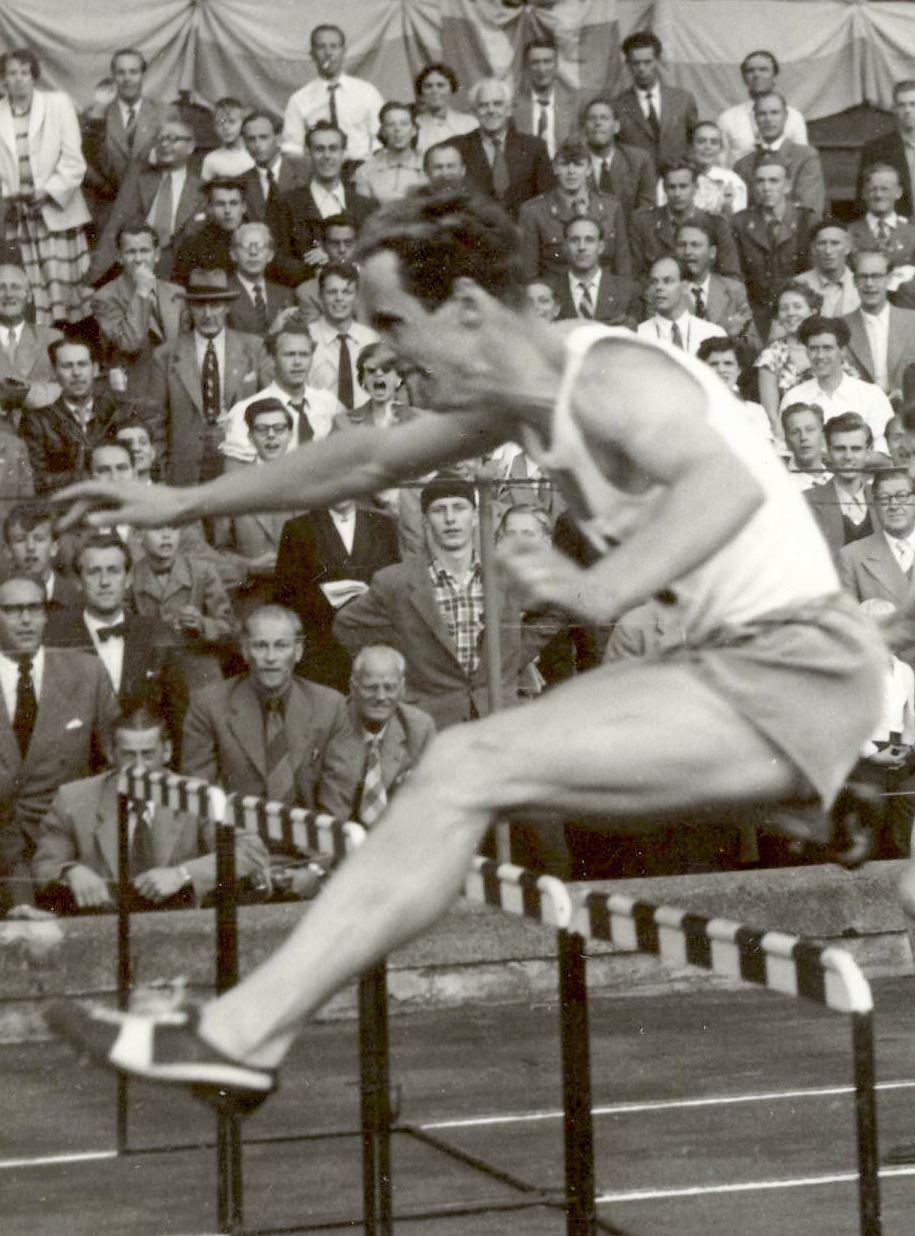
- Sven-Olov Eriksson in 1954

Personal information
- Born: 22 April 1929 Norrbärke, Sweden
- Died: 31 October 1999 (aged 70) Rättvik, Sweden
- Height: 1.78 m (5 ft 10 in)
- Weight: 70 kg (150 lb)

Sport
- Sport: Athletics
- Event: 400 m hurdles
- Club: IK Heros

Achievements and titles
- Personal best: 400 mH – 51.9 (1954)

Sven-Olov Eriksson (22 April 1929 – 31 October 1999) was a Swedish runner who specialized in the 400 m hurdles event. He competed at the 1952 Summer Olympics, but failed to reach the final.
