= Muhammad Yaqub (athlete) =

Pakistani hurdler (1926–2014)

Personal information
- Nationality: Pakistani
- Born: 17 August 1926 Davri village, Tehsil and District Rawalpindi, Punjab, British India
- Died: April 2014 (aged 87) Rawalpindi buried in his native village Davri.
- Height: 6 ft (183 cm)

Sport
- Sport: Track and field
- Event: 400 metres hurdles

Muhammad Yaqub (17 August 1926 – April 2014) was a Pakistani hurdler. He competed in the 400 metres hurdles at the 1956 Summer Olympics and the 1960 Summer Olympics.
