= Armando Filiput =

Sprinters

Personal information
- Nationality: Italian
- Born: 19 December 1923 Ronchi dei Legionari, Italy
- Died: 30 March 1982 (aged 58) Ronchi dei Legionari, Italy
- Height: 1.86 m (6 ft 1 in)
- Weight: 80 kg (176 lb)

Sport
- Country: Italy
- Sport: Athletics
- Event: 400 metres hurdles
- Club: Atalanta Brescia

Achievements and titles
- Personal bests: 400 m: 48"2 (1950); 400 m hs: 51"6 (1950)
Medal record
Men's athletics
Representing Italy
European Championships
Gold medal – first place	1950 Brussels	400 m hurdles
Silver medal – second place	1950 Brussels	4×400 m
Mediterranean Games
Gold medal – first place	1951 Alexandria	400 m hurdles
Bronze medal – third place	1955 Barcelona	400 m hurdles

Armando Filiput (19 December 1923 – 30 March 1982) was an Italian hurdler, European Champion in 1950. He was born and died in Ronchi dei Legionari.

== Biography ==
Filiput has 22 caps in Italy national athletics team (from 1942 to 1945). In his career he participated in one edition of the Olympic Games and won the Italian Athletics Championships 7 times.

== Achievements ==
Year	Competition	Venue	Position	Event	Performance	Notes
1950	European Championships	(Finland) Helsinki	1st	400 m hs	51"9	
1950	European Championships	(Finland) Helsinki	2nd	4 × 400 m relay	3'11"0	
1951	Mediterranean Games	(Egypt) Alexandria	1st	400 m hs	53"8	
1952	Olympic Games	(Finland) Helsinki	6th	400 m hs	54"4	
1955	Mediterranean Games	(Spain) Barcelona	3rd	400 m hs	53"4	

== National titles ==
- 7 wins in 400 metres hurdles at the Italian Athletics Championships (1946, 1949, 1950, 1951, 1952, 1953, 1954)

== See also ==
- FIDAL Hall of Fame
