= Andrew Goodman (activist) =

American civil rights activist and murder victim (1943–1964)

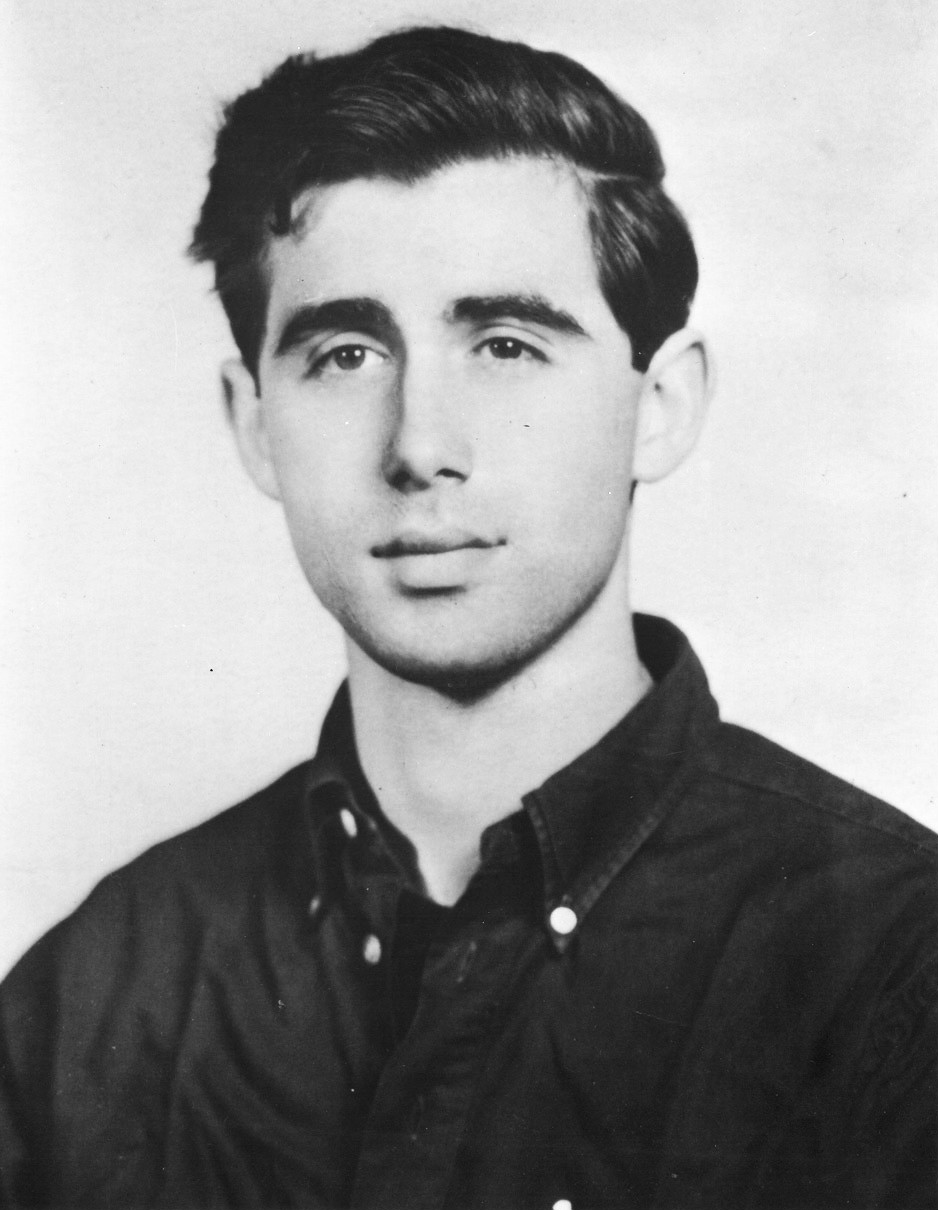
- Goodman in 1964
- Born: November 23, 1943; New York City, U.S.
- Died: June 21, 1964 (aged 20); Philadelphia, Mississippi, U.S.
- Cause of death: Murder (gunshot wounds)
- Education: Walden School; University of Wisconsin-Madison; Queens College, New York City
- Occupations: Social worker, Civil rights activist
- Mother: Carolyn Goodman
- Awards: Presidential Medal of Freedom (Posthumous; 2014)

Andrew Goodman (November 23, 1943 – June 21, 1964) was an American civil rights activist. He was one of three civil rights workers murdered in Philadelphia, Mississippi, by members of the Ku Klux Klan in 1964. Goodman was a volunteer for the Freedom Summer campaign that sought to register African Americans to vote in Mississippi and to set up Freedom Schools for black Southerners. His two fellow activists, James Chaney and Michael Schwerner, worked for the Congress of Racial Equality (CORE).

== Early life and beginnings of activism ==
Andrew Goodman was born on November 23, 1943, in New York City, the second of three boys born to Robert, a writer and civil engineer, and Carolyn Goodman, a psychologist and social activist. He grew up in the city's Upper West Side and Upper East Side. Goodman was Jewish, like fellow civil rights activist Michael Schwerner, alongside whom Goodman would be murdered. Goodman's neighborhood was a racially-mixed community of white and black families.

The Goodman family was involved in intellectual and socially progressive activism and were devoted to social justice. His mother Carolyn was a lifelong labor activist. In her youth, she helped farm workers to organize and was active in community efforts to support the Republican faction during the Spanish Civil War in the 1930s.

Andrew followed his parents' activist bent from a young age. At the age of 14, Goodman traveled to Washington, D.C., to participate in the 1958 Youth March for Integrated Schools. During the march, approximately 10,000 high school age students promoted the desegregation of American public schools after the U.S. Supreme Court's Brown v. Board of Education landmark decision in 1954 declared racial segregation in public schools to be unconstitutional. The next year, Goodman and a friend went to West Virginia to live in a coal mining town and attempted and failed to advocate to the governor on behalf of miners due to the poor working conditions there. At 17, Goodman traveled to Western Europe to understand the impact of large-scale agribusiness on small farmers. Goodman also participated in a 1960 protest at a New York Woolworth's as part of the sit-in movement protesting the segregationist policies of the five-and-dime store.

In 1961, Goodman graduated high school from the progressive Walden School, where he had attended from the age of 3. At Walden, he was involved in the theater program. He also arranged for Brooklyn Dodger Jackie Robinson, a neighbor of his and the first African-American to play in Major League Baseball, to speak at the school. After Walden, Goodman enrolled the Honors Program at the University of Wisconsin–Madison and considered a drama major, but withdrew after one semester after falling ill with pneumonia. He returned to New York City to improve his health and was selected for a role in the Off-Broadway play The Chief Thing by Russian dramatist Nikolaí Evreninov.

Goodman then enrolled at Queens College, New York City, and majored in anthropology. At Queens, he was a friend and classmate of Paul Simon. He developed an interest in poetry. One of his poems, "A Corollary to a Poem by A. E. Housman", was posthumously discovered by his college professor Mary Doyle Curran and published in the Massachusetts Review and the New York Times. With Goodman's brief acting experience, he originally planned to study drama but switched to anthropology. Goodman's growing interest in anthropology seemed to parallel his increasing political seriousness. Throughout college, Goodman acted with an Off-Broadway repertory company.

== Participation in Freedom Summer ==
The senators could not persist in this polite debate over the future dignity of a human race if the white Northerners were not so shockingly apathetic.

— Andrew Goodman, in a 1964 school paper

In the spring of 1964, his junior year at Queens College, Goodman attended a talk by Mississippi civil rights activists Aaron Henry, head of the state's NAACP branch, and Fannie Lou Hamer. Henry and Hamer were recruiting students under the age of 21, who with the permission of their parents, would participate in the Freedom Summer project to help register African Americans to vote in Mississippi and to set up Freedom Schools.

In June 1964, Goodman left New York to teach at a Congress of Racial Equality (CORE) training session for Freedom Summer volunteers at the Western College for Women (now part of Miami University) in Oxford, Ohio. In Ohio, Goodman met 24-year-old Michael Schwerner, a fellow New Yorker and an experienced volunteer with CORE, and 21-year-old James Chaney, a CORE activist in Mississippi. The three trained hundreds of Freedom Summer volunteers, mostly students, how to navigate the racism and violence they would encounter in Mississippi. At the training, Schwerner learned that one of the Freedom Schools in Mississippi that he had helped to organize at the Mount Zion Methodist Church in Philadelphia had been burned down by the Ku Klux Klan (KKK). To investigate, the three men left Ohio for Mississippi by car on June 20.

== Murder ==
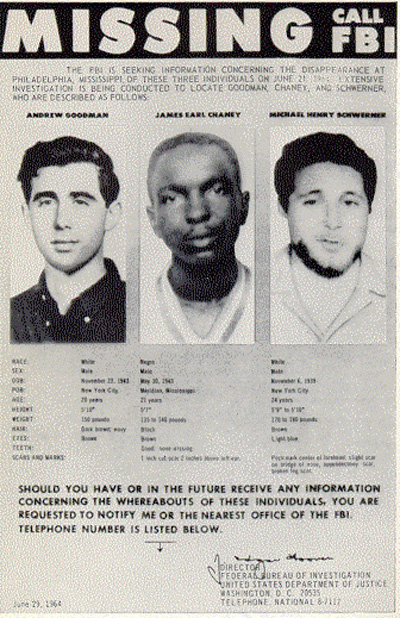
Missing persons poster created by the FBI in 1964, shows the photographs of Andrew Goodman, James Chaney, and Michael Schwerner.

On June 21, their first full day in the state, the trio drove from their home base of Meridian for Philadelphia, a community about an hour from Meridian, to visit the church ruins and meet with church members. When they were driving back to Meridian, they were pulled over by Neshoba County, Mississippi Deputy Sheriff Cecil Price (a KKK member), for allegedly driving 65 miles-per-hour in a 30-mile-per-hour speed limit zone. Price arrested the three men and took them to the Neshoba County jail, where Chaney was booked for speeding, while Schwerner and Goodman were booked "for investigation". Chaney was charged a $20 fine and the three men were released before 10:25 pm and instructed to leave the county. However, while Chaney, Schwerner, and Goodman were in custody, Price contacted local KKK leader and minister Edgar Ray Killen and informed him of the three activists in custody. According to a subsequent U.S. Department of Justice investigation, Killen then gathered other KKK members and devised a plot to attack the three as they left the jail.

Price followed them in his patrol car. At 10:25, Price sped to catch up with the station wagon before it crossed the border into the relative safety of Lauderdale County. Price ordered the three out of their car and into his. He drove them to a deserted area on Rock Cut Road while followed by two cars filled with other Klansmen. Price turned the trio over to the Klansmen who, after beating Chaney, shot and killed Schwerner, Goodman and Chaney. An autopsy of Goodman, showing fragments of red clay in his lungs and grasped in his fists, suggests he was probably buried alive alongside the already dead Chaney and Schwerner.

The Mississippi State Sovereignty Commission was strongly opposed to integration and civil rights. It paid spies to identify citizens suspected of activism, especially people from the North and West who entered the state. The records opened by court order in 1998 also revealed the state's deep complicity in the murders of Chaney, Goodman, and Schwerner, because its investigator A. L. Hopkins passed on to the Commission information about the workers, including the car license number of a new civil rights worker. Records showed the commission, in turn, passed the information on to the Neshoba County Sheriff, who was implicated in the murders.

=== Investigation and trial ===
The murders changed the course of the Civil Rights Movement. Willie Blue, a surviving participant in the Freedom Summer movement, said, "Goodman's richer than whipped cream. He wasn't supposed to die in Vietnam; he sure wasn't supposed to die in Mississippi. When America's brightest are murdered for doing something fundamentally American, suddenly the world knows about Mississippi. It was another nail in the segregated coffin." The FBI entered the case after the men disappeared. They helped find them buried in an earthen dam. The US government prosecuted the case under the Enforcement Act of 1870. The Neshoba County deputy sheriff and six conspirators were convicted by Federal prosecutors of civil rights violations but were not convicted of murder. Two defendants were acquitted because the jury deadlocked.

== Reinvestigation ==
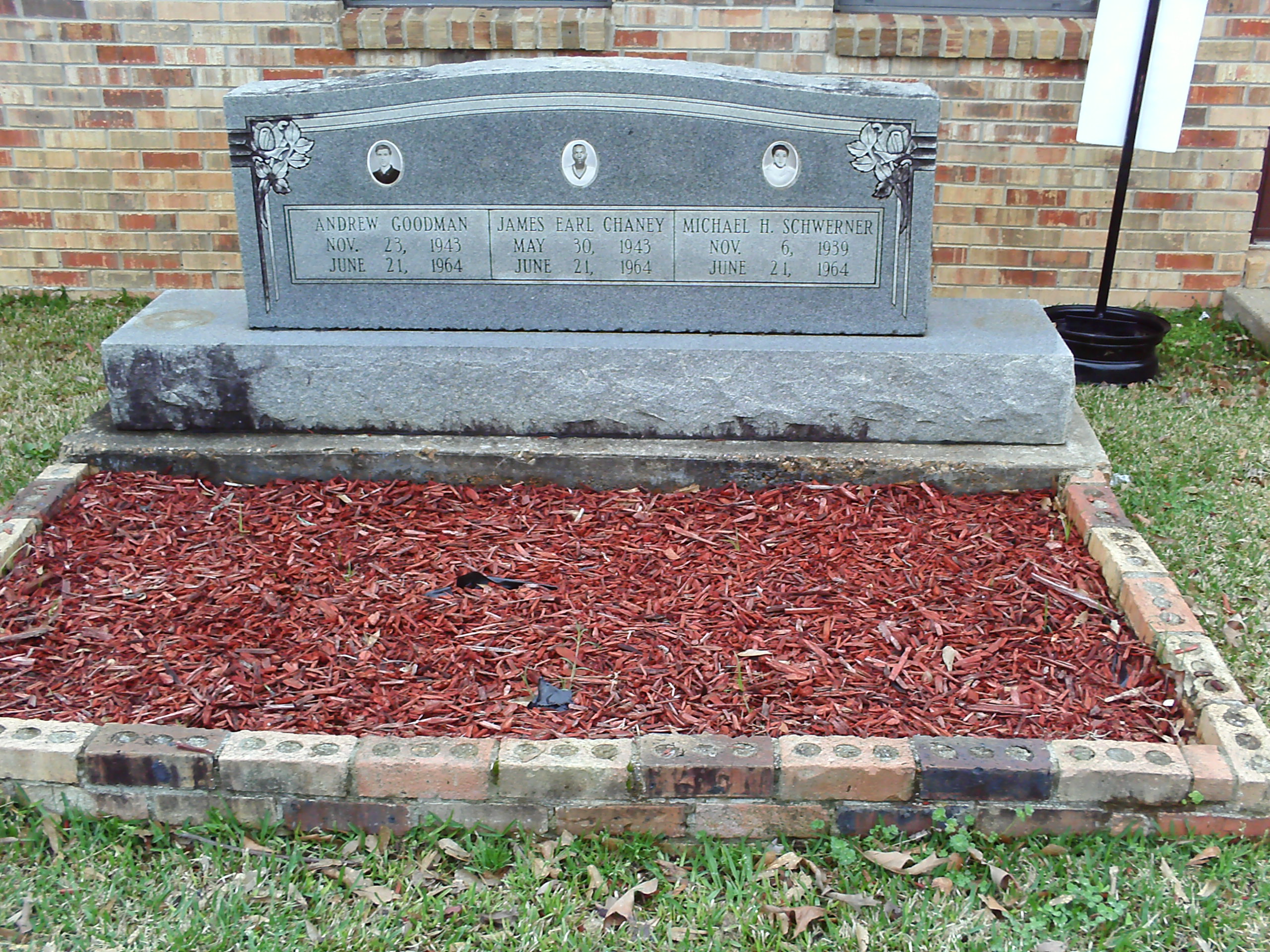
A memorial to victims Andrew Goodman, James Earl Chaney, and Michael H. Schwerner at Mt. Nebo Missionary Baptist Church, Philadelphia, Mississippi. See murders of Chaney, Goodman, and Schwerner.

Journalist Jerry Mitchell, an award-winning investigative reporter for the Jackson Clarion-Ledger, had written extensively about the case for many years. Mitchell, who had already earned fame for helping secure convictions in several other high-profile civil rights era murder cases, including the assassination of Medgar Evers in Jackson, Mississippi, the Birmingham, Alabama 16th Street Baptist Church bombing, and the murder of Vernon Dahmer in Mississippi, developed new evidence, found new witnesses and pressured the state to take action. Barry Bradford, an Illinois high-school teacher later famous for helping clear the name of civil rights martyr Clyde Kennard, and three students, Allison Nichols, Sarah Siegel, and Brittany Saltiel, joined Mitchell's efforts.

Bradford and his students' documentary, produced for the National History Day contest, presented important new evidence and compelling reasons for reopening the Goodman, Chaney, and Schwerner case. They also obtained an interview with Edgar Ray Killen, which helped persuade the state to open the case for investigation. Mitchell was able to determine the identity of "Mr. X", the mystery informer who had helped the FBI discover the bodies and smash the conspiracy of the Klan in 1964, in part using evidence developed by Bradford and the students.

On January 7, 2005, Edgar Ray Killen was arrested. He was found guilty of three counts of manslaughter – not murder – on June 21, 2005, exactly 41 years to the day after the murders. He was sentenced to sixty years in prison—twenty years for each count, to be served consecutively. He appealed the verdict, but the sentence was upheld on April 12, 2007, by the Supreme Court of Mississippi. He died in prison on January 11, 2018, at age 93.

On June 20, 2016, just one day ahead of the 52nd anniversary of the murders, Mississippi Attorney General Jim Hood announced an end to the federal and state investigations into the 'Mississippi Murders', officially closing the case.

== Legacy and honors ==
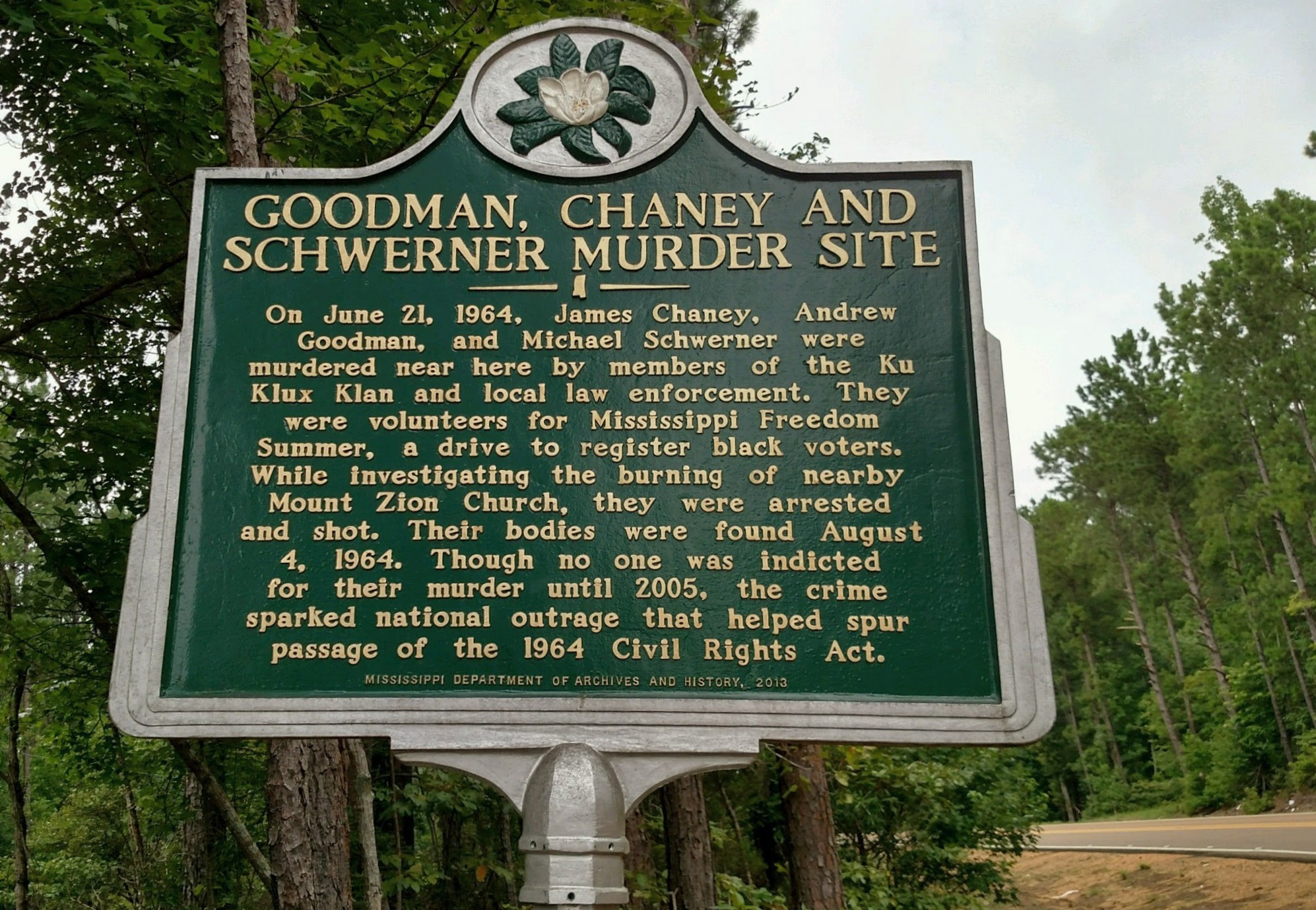
State of Mississippi roadside marker denoting the location where the 1964 murders of American civil rights workers Goodman, Chaney, and Schwerner took place

In 1966, Andrew's parents, Robert and Carolyn Goodman, started The Andrew Goodman Foundation to carry on the spirit and purpose of their son's life. After the death of Robert Goodman in 1969, Carolyn continued the work of the Foundation, focusing on projects like a reverse march to Mississippi and a 25th Anniversary Memorial. The memorial, which took place at St. John The Divine Church in New York City, was attended by 10,000 people and was presided by Governor Mario Cuomo, Maya Angelou, Pete Seeger, Aaron Henry, Harry Belafonte, and others closely associated with the Civil Rights Movement. After Carolyn's death in August 2007, David Goodman and Sylvia Golbin Goodman, Andrew's younger brother and sister-in-law respectively, took up the work of the Foundation.

For nearly 50 years, the organization was a private foundation acting in the public interest, although it was turned into a public charity in 2012. In 2014, on the fiftieth anniversary of the murders, the Foundation officially launched the Vote Everywhere program designed to support college students who are continuing the work of Freedom Summer.

=== Goodman ===
- In 2002, a 2,176-foot peak in the Adirondack Mountains town of Tupper Lake, New York, was officially named Goodman Mountain in Goodman's memory. Goodman's family had spent summers there for 30 years.
- The Walden School, in Manhattan, named its middle and upper school building in Goodman's memory. The Trevor Day School now occupies the building and has maintained the building's name as the "Andrew Goodman Building".
- Goodman, along with Chaney and Schwerner, received a posthumous Presidential Medal of Freedom from President Barack Obama in 2014.
- The Chaney-Goodman-Schwerner Clock Tower of Rosenthal Library is named in honor of James, Andrew, and Mickey on the CUNY Queens College Campus in New York City.
- The song "He Was My Brother", released in 1964 by Simon & Garfunkel, is a dedication to Goodman along with two other civil rights activists.
- The play The Invaders, written by Ralph Carhart and presented by the Andrew Goodman Foundation at Queens College in 2024

== See also ==
- Freedom Summer
- List of Queens College people
