= Glenn Davis (hurdler) =

American track athlete and football player (1934–2009)

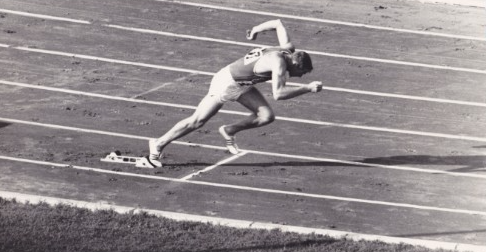
- Glenn Davis in Rome, 1960

Personal information
- Full name: Glenn Ashby Davis
- Nickname: Jeep
- Born: September 12, 1934 Wellsburg, West Virginia, U.S.
- Died: January 28, 2009 (aged 74) Barberton, Ohio, U.S.
- Height: 6 ft 0 in (183 cm)
- Weight: 161 lb (73 kg)
Medal record
Men's athletics
Representing the United States
Olympic Games
Gold medal – first place	1956 Melbourne	400 m hurdles
Gold medal – first place	1960 Rome	400 m hurdles
Gold medal – first place	1960 Rome	4 × 400 m relay
- Updated on June 24, 2015

Glenn Ashby "Jeep" Davis (September 12, 1934 – January 28, 2009) was an American Olympic hurdler and sprinter who won a total of three gold medals in the 1956 and 1960 Olympic games.

Davis later played professional football as a wide receiver with the Detroit Lions of the National Football League (NFL) before becoming a teacher and coach in his adopted hometown of Barberton, Ohio, for 33 years.

== Childhood and early life ==
Davis was born in Wellsburg, West Virginia. When both his parents died when he was 15, he moved to Barberton, Ohio with his brother. He attended Barberton High School, and Marietta High School.

Davis singlehandedly led his team to the 1954 Class A Ohio high school track and field championship, scoring all 20 of Barberton's points. Davis won the 220-yard dash, the broad jump and the 180-yard low hurdles – setting a then-state record in that event – while also placing fourth in the 100-yard dash. His point total placed him ahead of Mansfield, which scored 14 points in the meet and took second. He was offered more than 200 athletic scholarships for college, and chose to attend Ohio State University.

== College and Olympics ==
Davis won Olympic titles in the 400 meter hurdles at both the Melbourne Olympics in 1956 and the Rome Olympics in 1960. In 1958, he was awarded the James E. Sullivan Award as the nation's top amateur athlete.

Davis was either at or close to world records in many events including: 100 yards/meters (9.6/10.3), 200 meters (21.0), 400 metres (45.4), the half mile (1:52), 120 yard high hurdles (14.0), 200 meter low hurdles on curve (22.5 WR), 400 meter intermediate hurdles (49.2 WR), high jump (6–8), and long jump (24'8"). He, Felix Sanchez, Angelo Taylor and Edwin Moses are the only four hurdlers to have won the Olympic 400 meter hurdles twice. However Davis is the only man to have set world records in the quarter mile with hurdles and without. His coach Larry Snyder, who also had coached Jesse Owens, said that Davis was possibly a greater talent than Jesse Owens.

Davis won a third gold medal as a member of the United States 4 × 400 meter relay team in 1960. He set world records in both flat and hurdle races. He is a member of the United States Olympic Hall of Fame.

== Later careers ==
Davis was featured on the June 27, 1960 cover of Sports Illustrated. After his track career, Davis played wide receiver for the Detroit Lions in 1960 and 1961. He had 10 catches for 132 yards in his two NFL seasons. He was the track coach at Cornell University from 1963 to 1967, coaching the team to the Ivy League title in his final season.

Davis was a longtime resident of Barberton, Ohio, teaching and coaching there for 33 years, and was the owner of Jeep's Olympic Driving School. Prior to this, Davis was a popular teacher at Barberton High School and part owner of one of the students' favorite gathering spots, Jeep and Joe's Pizza. He also loved to play the harmonica.

He was sometimes confused with Heisman Trophy-winning football player Glenn Woodward Davis (1924–2005). The two sportsmen occasionally received each other's mail, but they never met.
