= Charles Moore (hurdler) =

American athlete (1929–2020)

Charles H. Moore Jr.
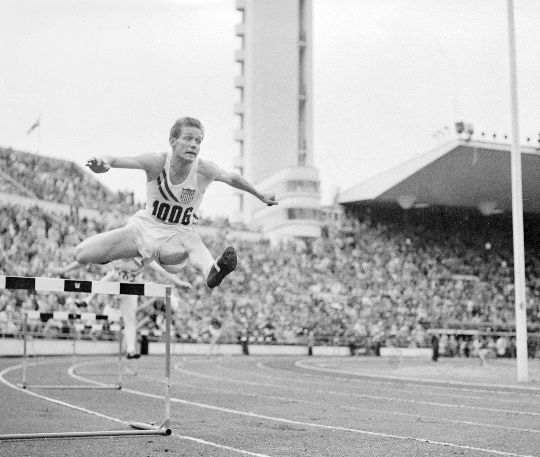
- Moore at the 1952 Summer Olympics
- Born: Charles Hewes Moore Jr. August 12, 1929; Coatesville, Pennsylvania, U.S.
- Died: October 8, 2020 (aged 91); Laporte, Pennsylvania, U.S.
- Education: Mercersburg Academy '47; Cornell University '52
- Occupations: Athlete; business executive; investment fund manager; athletics director; philanthropist; corporate-social activist; author
- Spouse: Judith M. Moore (m. 1971–present)
- Children: 8
- Parent(s): Charles Hewes Moore Sr. (father); Jane Scott Moore (mother)
- Sports career
- Country: United States
- Sport: Track and field
- Events: 400 metre hurdles 4 × 400 metres relay
- College team: Cornell Big Red
- Coached by: John Francis Moakley; Lou Montgomery
Medal record
Olympic Games
Men's athletics
Representing the United States
Gold medal – first place	1952 Helsinki	400 m hurdles
Silver medal – second place	1952 Helsinki	4 × 400 m relay
- Website: runningonpurposebook.com charlieandjudith.com

Charles Hewes Moore Jr. (August 12, 1929 – October 8, 2020) was an American track and field athlete, as well as a philanthropist, businessman, and champion of societal reform. Moore won a gold medal in the 400 metre hurdles in the 1952 Summer Olympics with a time of 50.8 seconds, narrowly missing the world record of 50.6 seconds. He had set the American record (50.7 seconds) during Olympic qualifying. He also ran the third leg of the second-place 4 × 400 metres relay at the Olympics. Moore finished second for the James E. Sullivan Award for top U.S. athlete in 1952, and was selected as one of "100 Golden Olympians" in 1996. In 1999, he was inducted into the United States National Track and Field Hall of Fame. Charles Moore, an Olympics athlete of track and field died on October 8, 2020, in Laporte, Pennsylvania. He was 91 years old.

== Athletic achievements ==
Moore did not start his track and field career until attending Mercersburg Academy as a junior, where he was coached by Jimmy Curran, who recommended he try hurdling based on his father's success with the event. His father, Charles "Crip" Moore, Sr. was a hurdler who made the U.S. team as an alternate in the 1924 Summer Olympics in Paris. Charles Jr. continued with track and field as a student at Cornell University in Ithaca, New York, where he enrolled in 1947, but was limited to four years eligibility. In his fifth and final year, preceding his performance at the 1952 Summer Olympics in Helsinki, he continued to compete through the New York Athletic Club.

As a student at Cornell University, Moore won NCAA titles in the 440-yard race in 1949 and the 220-yard hurdles in 1951. He won the indoor IC4A 600-yard run in 1950 and the indoor Amateur Athletic Union (AAU) 600-yard run in 1952, setting meet records in both races. He also won four straight AAU titles in the 400 metre hurdles from 1949 to 1952. At Cornell, Moore pioneered taking 13 steps between hurdles in the grueling 400-metre hurdle event, where 15 steps had been the practice prior to the 1950s. While its official use in a race is also attributed to Russian Yuriy Lituyev, many were experimenting with this as part of training.

On July 21, 1952, at the XV Olympiad in Helsinki, Finland, Moore won a gold medal and set the Olympic record in the 400 metre hurdles. He also ran the third leg for the American team's 4 × 400 metre relay, which earned him a silver medal. The team's performance broke the standing world record by 4 seconds (3:04.0), but was not sufficient to secure the gold against Jamaica, who ran the race in 3:03.9.

Moore was inducted into Cornell University's inaugural Athletics Hall of Fame in 1978. The Charles H. Moore Outstanding Senior Varsity Athlete Award at Cornell is named for him. In March 2015, Cornell Magazine ranked him as the third greatest athlete in the university's history. From 1994 to 1999, he was director of athletics at Cornell University.

== Corporate career ==
After the Olympics in 1952 Moore fully retired from athletics to pursue a career in business that would last 42 years. This started with his family's business Lenape Forge in 1952, which he would eventually broker the sale of to Gulf+Western in 1965. He was president and CEO of several multinational manufacturing companies, including Ransburg Corporation, Clevepak Corporation, Allied Thermal (a subsidiary of Interpace Corporation), Lapp Insulator (a division of Interpace Corporation), and Lenape Forge (a division of Gulf+Western). He also served as managing director of Peers & Co. (investment banking), CEO of Peers Management Resources, Inc. (management consulting), and vice chairman of Advisory Capital Partners, Inc. (investment advising).

== Corporate social impact ==
From 1992 to 2000, Moore was Public Sector Director of the United States Olympic Committee (USOC) and chairman of that organization's audit committee. He has also served as chairman of the USOC's 2012 Bid City Evaluation Task Force. Moore served as executive director of the Committee Encouraging Corporate Philanthropy (CECP) since the organization's founding in 1999 by John C. Whitehead, Paul Newman and Peter L. Malkin until February 2013.

Moore was the former Governor of the National Art Museum of Sport, a former member of the President's Council on Fitness, Sports and Nutrition (PCFSN), and a National Board alumni member of the Smithsonian Institution. In 1984, while CEO of Clevepak Corporation, he received the Herbert Adams Memorial Award for Advancement of American Sculpture. CR Magazine recognized him as the NonProfit & NGO CEO of the Year in 2008 and gave him its Lifetime Achievement in Philanthropy award in 2013.

== Education ==
Moore was a 1947 cum laude graduate of Mercersburg Academy and a 1952 BME graduate of Cornell University. He was a member of the honorary societies Aleph Samach and Quill and Dagger society at Cornell. At Mercersburg, he served on the board of regents from 1996 to 2005 and was named the Class of 1932's Distinguished Alumnus in 2002.

== Memoir ==
In March 2017 Moore published a book recounting his various careers as athlete, business person and philanthropist. Running on Purpose: Winning Olympic Gold, Advancing Corporate Leadership and Creating Sustainable Value was co-authored with James Cockerille and published by Edgemoor Ink.

The book is part memoir, providing detail on his upbringing, education and eventual Olympic competition. It is also part business-treatise, detailing numerous turnarounds he led for corporations as well as the athletic department of Cornell. In the last chapter, Moore drew on his athletic orientation and societal impact efforts with Fortune 500 companies. In it he proposed a new form of commercial competitiveness. The challenge he offered is for executives, their boards and investors to embrace a new framework of measurement. Such a framework is not defined, however. Instead Moore proposed a greater integration between the work of pioneering groups in integrated reporting, especially IIRC, and sustainability accounting, like the Sustainability Accounting Standards Board (SASB). Underpinning this "call to action" is a belief that long-term factors must be upheld in the management of a business alongside short-term pressures, and that the balance has dangerously skewed toward short-term thinking. By competing through this universal framework and orienting toward "sustainable value creation", Moore suggested, corporations could reverse the erosion of trust that leading companies (if not capitalism in general) are experiencing.

In December 2017, Moore published a second book, One Hurdle at a Time: An Olympian's Guide to Clearing Life's Obstacles, intended for a younger audience, approximately ages 8–14. He collaborated with award-winning children's author Brad Herzog in an attempt to offer a glimpse into his "race of a lifetime".
