= Bob Shaw (athlete) =

British hurdler

Personal information
- Nationality: British (Welsh)
- Born: 27 December 1932 (age 93) Taff's Well, Great Britain
- Height: 179 cm (5 ft 10 in)
- Weight: 73 kg (161 lb)

Sport
- Sport: Track and field
- Event: 400 metres hurdles
- Club: University of Oxford AC; Achilles Club
Medal record
Athletics
Representing Wales
British Empire & Commonwealth Games
Bronze medal – third place	1954 Vancouver	440y hurdles

Robert Douglas Shaw (born 27 December 1932) is a British former hurdler who competed at the 1956 Summer Olympics.

== Biography ==
Shaw was educated at Whitchurch Grammar School and then Manchester Grammar School before studying at the Exeter College, Oxford. He went on to win the 1951 Welsh AAA 120 yards title.

Shaw finished second behind Harry Kane in the 440 yards hurdles event at the 1954 AAA Championships and then became the British 440 yards hurdles champion after winning the British AAA Championships title at the 1955 AAA Championships.in In between, Shaw won a bronze medal for Wales in the 440 yards hurdles at the 1954 British Empire and Commonwealth Games in Vancouver.

Shaw represented Great Britain at the 1956 Olympic Games in Melbourne, where he competed in the men's 400 metres hurdles competition.
