= Alexandre Yankoff =

French hurdler

Personal information
- Nationality: French
- Born: 27 June 1931 Nevers, France
- Died: 2 November 2015 (aged 84)

Sport
- Sport: Track and field
- Event: 400 metres hurdles

Alexandre Yankoff (27 June 1931 – 2 November 2015) was a French hurdler. He competed in the men's 400 metres hurdles at the 1956 Summer Olympics.
