= Timofey Lunev =

Belarusian hurdler

Personal information
- Nationality: Belarusian
- Born: 6 February 1926 Minsk, Belarusian SSR
- Died: 1987 (aged 60–61)

Sport
- Sport: Track and field
- Event: 400 metres hurdles

Timofey Lunev (6 February 1926 – 1987) was a Belarusian hurdler. He competed in the men's 400 metres hurdles at the 1952 Summer Olympics, representing the Soviet Union.
