= Jagdev Singh =

Indian hurdler (born 1931)

Personal information
- Nationality: Indian
- Born: 1931

Sport
- Sport: Track and field
- Event: 400 metres hurdles

Jagdev Singh (born 1931) is an Indian hurdler. He competed in the men's 400 metres hurdles at the 1956 Summer Olympics.
