= Robert Bart =

French sprinter (1930–2003)

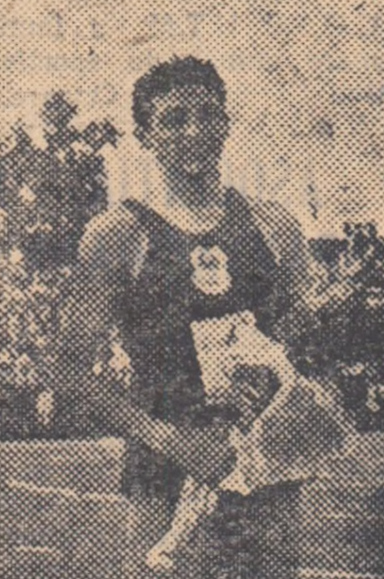

Personal information
- Nationality: French
- Born: 21 June 1930
- Died: 15 January 2003 (aged 72)

Sport
- Sport: Sprinting
- Event: 4 × 400 metres relay

Robert Bart (21 June 1930 – 15 January 2003) was a French sprinter. He competed in the men's 4 × 400 metres relay at the 1952 Summer Olympics.
