= Rudolf Haidegger =

Austrian sprinter and hurdler

Personal information
- Nationality: Austrian
- Born: 10 July 1923
- Died: 22 June 1987 (aged 63)

Sport
- Sport: Sprinting
- Event: 400 metres

Rudolf Haidegger (10 July 1923 – 22 June 1987) was an Austrian sprinter. He competed in the men's 400 metres at the 1952 Summer Olympics.
