= Guy Cury =

French hurdler (1930–2018)

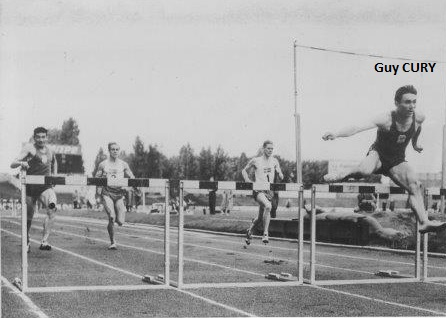

Guy Cury (21 March 1930 – 16 March 2018) was a French hurdler who competed in the 1956 Summer Olympics.
