= Anatoliy Yulin =

Belarusian hurdler

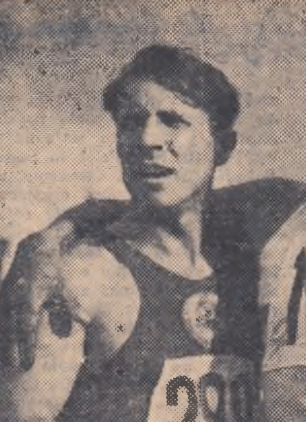
- The International Athletics Championships of the R.P.R. on the Republic Stadium. Anatoly Iulin

Medal record

Men's athletics

Representing Soviet Union

European Championships
Gold medal – first place	1954 Bern	400 m hurdles

Anatoliy Yulin (Belarusian: Анатоль Юлін; 9 March 1929 – 29 August 2002) was a Belarusian athlete who competed in the 1952 Summer Olympics and in the 1956 Summer Olympics.
