= Yuriy Lituyev =

Soviet hurdler

Medal record

Men's athletics

Representing the Soviet Union

Olympic Games
Silver medal – second place	1952 Helsinki	400 m hurdles

European Championships
Gold medal – first place	1958 Stockholm	400 m hurdles
Silver medal – second place	1950 Brussels	400 m hurdles
Silver medal – second place	1954 Bern	400 m hurdles

Yuriy Nikolaevich Lituyev (Russian: Юрий Николаевич Литуев) (April 11, 1925 – February 3, 2000) was a Soviet athlete who competed mainly in the 400 metre hurdles. He trained in Leningrad and later in Moscow at the Armed Forces sports society.

Lituyev took part in the Second World War, where he was a battery commander. He competed for the USSR in the 1952 Summer Olympics held in Helsinki, Finland in the 400 metre hurdles where he won the silver medal. In 1953, he broke the world record in the 400 m hurdles. He also competed in the men's 400 metres (flat) event in 1952.
