= Kemal Horulu =

Turkish sprinter and pornographic film director (1926–1991)

Personal information
- Nationality: Turkish
- Born: 9 March 1926 Trabzon, Turkey
- Died: 6 November 1991 (aged 65) California, U.S.

Sport
- Sport: Sprinting
- Event: 400 metres

Kemal Horulu (9 March 1926 – 6 November 1991) was a Turkish sprinter and a director, producer, actor and screenwriter in the pornographic film industry in the United States.

He was born in 1926 in Trabzon, Turkey. He competed in the men's 400 metres at the 1948 Summer Olympics.

Horulu moved to the United States in the 1950s. He participated in film work in Hollywood for years. He was also studying film production at the university. He first made short films in 1966 and 1967. Then he became interested in sex films. In an interview published in the Turkish magazine Hey on 11 February 1976, he stated that he had made eight such films up to that date, and the first was Hang Up. It was followed by Sexual Practices in Sweden. His 1971 film All About Sex of All Nations ran for 44 weeks at the Rialto Theater in New York City. Some of the films he directed, such as Lustful Feelings (1977), starred well-known actors such as Ron Jeremy—and also Horulu himself.

He died in 1991 in California, United States.
