= Harry Whittle =

British athlete

Personal information
- Nationality: British (English)
- Born: 2 May 1922 Bolton, England
- Died: 11 May 1990 (aged 68) Bolton, England
- Height: 183 cm (6 ft 0 in)
- Weight: 78 kg (172 lb)

Sport
- Sport: Track and field
- Event: 400 metres hurdles
- Club: Bath AC; Reading Athletic Club
Medal record
Men's athletics
Representing Great Britain
European Championships
Bronze medal – third place	1950 Brussels	400 m hurdles

Harold 'Harry' Whittle (2 May 1922 – 11 May 1990) was a British hurdler and long jumper who competed at two Olympic Games.

== Biography ==
Born in Bolton (then in Lancashire) Whittle was educated at Queen Street Council School and Bolton School before taking a civil engineering degree at the University of Manchester.

Whittle became the British 440 yards hurdles champion after winning the British AAA Championships title at the 1947 AAA Championships.

After successfully retaining his title at the 1948 AAA Championships, he represented the Great Britain team at the 1948 Olympic Games in London, in the 400 metres hurdles event.

He won his third consecutive AAA title before representing the England athletics team at the 1950 British Empire Games in Auckland, New Zealand, competing in four events; the 440 yards, 440 yards hurdles, long jump and triple jump.

Just five months later he won his fourth AAA title and also won a bronze medal at the 1950 European Athletics Championships in Brussels. He then proceeded to win three more AAA titles in 1951, 1952 and 1953, making him a seven consecutive British champion in 440 yards hurdles. His all-round ability also enabled him to claim two long jump national championships in 1947 and 1949.

Whittle represented the Great Britain team at the 1952 Olympic Games in Helsinki, where he was named the team captain.
