= Fotis Kosmas =

Greek hurdler and decathlete

Fotis Kosmas GR: "Φὼτιος Κοσμάς" (26 November 1926 – 15 June 1995) was a Greek hurdler and decathlete who competed in the 1952 Summer Olympics.

== Biography ==
Kosmas was born in the village of Clio, on the island of Lesvos. His father, Christos, was a refugee from Aivalik of Asia Minor, and his mother Despina was from the main town of the island, Mytilini. After his parents wed, they stayed in Lesvos. They moved from Lesvos to Alexandroupoli before World War II, and during the war the whole family moved to the island of Samotrace. There the young Fotis met his wife Meropi, with whom he married when they returned to Alexandroupoli. The couple had two children, Despina and Christo.
