= Lars Ylander =

Swedish hurdler (1928–2010)

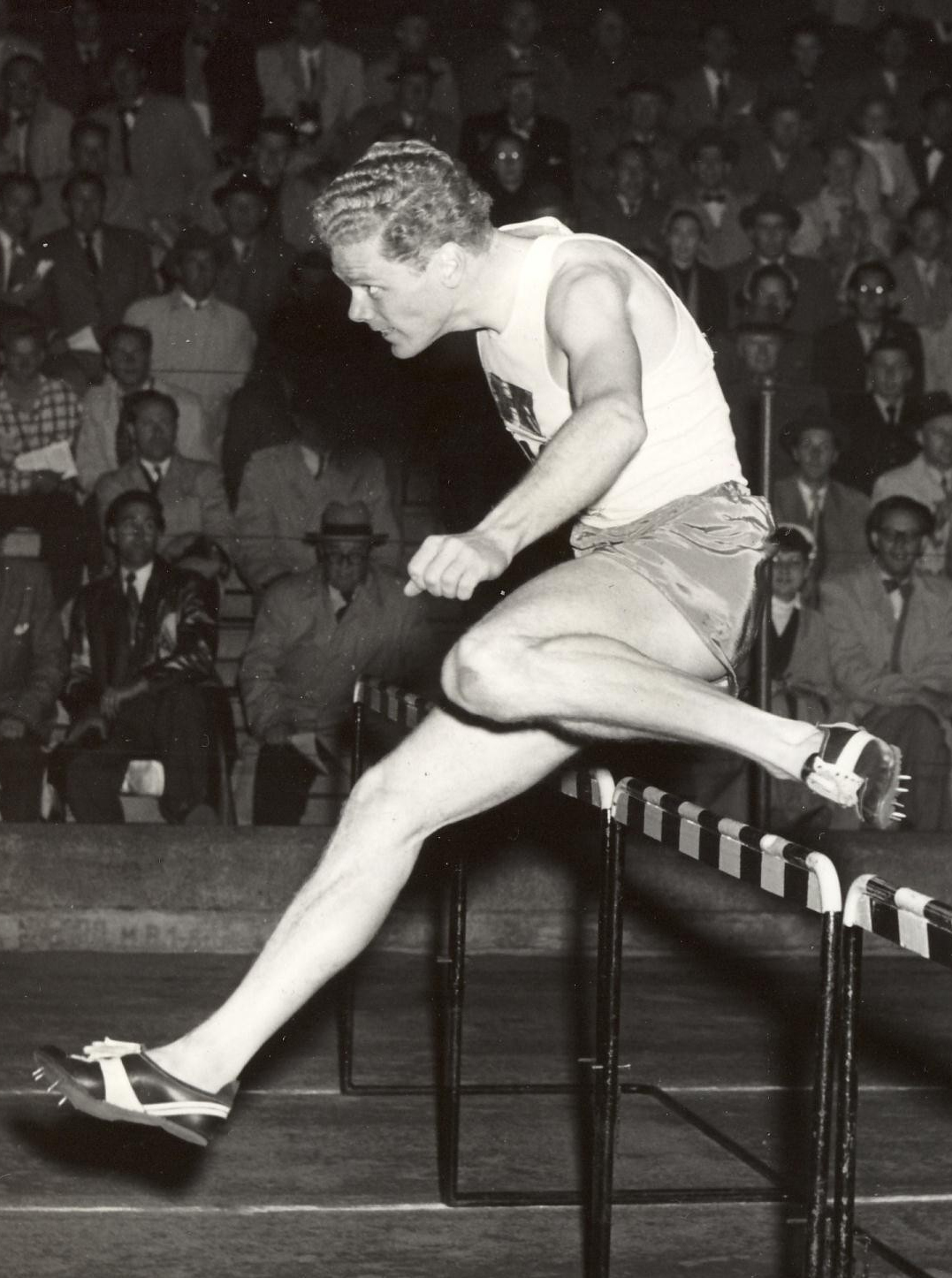
- Lars Ylander in 1952

Personal information
- Born: 12 August 1928 Uppsala, Sweden
- Died: 16 November 2010 (aged 82) Karlstad, Sweden
- Height: 1.83 m (6 ft 0 in)
- Weight: 72 kg (159 lb)

Sport
- Sport: Athletics
- Event: 400 m hurdles
- Club: Turebergs IF, Sollentuna

Achievements and titles
- Personal best: 400 mH – 52.2 (1952)

Lars Aage Ylander (12 August 1928 – 16 November 2010) was a Swedish sprinter who specialized in the 400 m hurdles. In this event he won the national title in 1952 and 1953 and finished fifth at the 1950 European Athletics Championships, but failed to reach the final at the 1952 Summer Olympics.
