= Harry Kane (hurdler) =

British hurdler (born 1933)

Personal information
- Nationality: British (English)
- Born: 24 May 1933 (age 93) London, England
- Height: 183 cm (6 ft 0 in)
- Weight: 77 kg (170 lb)

Sport
- Sport: Athletics
- Event: hurdles
- Club: London Athletic Club
Medal record
Athletics
Representing England
British Empire & Commonwealth Games
Silver medal – second place	1954 Vancouver	440y hurdles

Harry Kane (born 24 May 1933) is a British former Olympic hurdler. Born "Harry Cohen" to a Jewish family in England, he set British and Maccabiah Games records during his career.

== Biography ==
In his early athletics career, in May 1949, Kane finished runner up in two flat races in an athletics competition held in Victoria Park, Bethnal Green. Kane finished second in the 220yds sprint to his cousin, Ivor Baylin and Kane finished second to Dove in the 440yds race.

At the 1953 Maccabiah Games, Kane won the 400 metres with a games record times of 50.5. In 1954, Kane set an English inter-country record in the 440 yard hurdles, and matched the Scottish all-comers record.

Kane became the British 440 yards hurdles champion after winning the British AAA Championships title at the 1954 AAA Championships, with a time of 53.4.. Shortly afterwards Kane represented the England team at the 1954 British Empire and Commonwealth Games in Vancouver, where he finished second and claimed the silver medal in the 1954 British Empire and Commonwealth Games 440 yard hurdles, with a time of 53.3.

Kane set his personal best of 51.5 in the 400 metres, setting a British record. He was ranked seventh in the world in the 400 hurdles.

Kane represented Great Britain at the 1956 Olympic Games in Melbourne, in the 400 metres hurdles.

Kane finished third behind Tom Farrell in the 440 yards hurdles event at the 1957 AAA Championships. In 1957, he was ranked eighth in the world in the 400 hurdles and won a gold medal at the 1957 Maccabiah Games in the quarter mile run, won the 400 meter hurdles, and took a silver medal in the 200 meter hurdles, with a time of 25.3 seconds.
