= Australia at the 1950 British Empire Games =

- CG code: AUS
- CGA: Australian Commonwealth Games Association

in Auckland, New Zealand
- Competitors: 148 in 11 sports
- Flag bearers: Opening: Mervyn Wood; Closing:
- Officials: 20
- Medals Ranked 1st: Gold 34 Silver 27 Bronze 19 Total 80

British Empire Games appearances
- 1930; 1934; 1938; 1950; 1954; 1958; 1962; 1966; 1970; 1974; 1978; 1982; 1986; 1990; 1994; 1998; 2002; 2006; 2010; 2014; 2018; 2022; 2026; 2030

Australia competed at the 1950 British Empire Games held in Auckland, New Zealand between 4 and 11 February 1950, after a 12-year gap from the third edition of the games. Australia won medals in eleven out of the eleven sports that it entered.

== Medallists ==
The following Australian competitors won medals at the games.

Medal	Name	Sport	Event
Gold	John Treloar	Athletics	Men's 100 yards
Gold	John Treloar	Athletics	Men's 220 yards
Gold	Edwin Carr	Athletics	Men's 440 yards
Gold	Peter Gardner	Athletics	Men's 120 yards Hurdles
Gold	Scotchy Gordon; David Johnson; John Treloar; William de Gruchy	Athletics	Men's 4 × 110 yards relay
Gold	Edwin Carr; George Gedge; James Humphreys; Ross Price	Athletics	Men's 4 × 440 yards relay
Gold	John Winter	Athletics	Men's High Jump
Gold	Brian Oliver	Athletics	Men's Triple Jump
Gold	Ian Reed	Athletics	Men's Discus Throw
Gold	Marjorie Jackson	Athletics	Women's 100 yards
Gold	Marjorie Jackson	Athletics	Women's 220 yards
Gold	Shirley Strickland	Athletics	Women's 80 metres Hurdles
Gold	Marjorie Jackson; Shirley Strickland; Verna Johnston	Athletics	Women's 110–220–110 yards relay
Gold	Ann Shanley; Marjorie Jackson; Shirley Strickland; Verna Johnston	Athletics	Women's 220–110–220–110 yards relay
Gold	Charlotte MacGibbon	Athletics	Women's Javelin Throw
Gold	Russell Mockridge	Cycling	Men's Time Trial
Gold	Russell Mockridge	Cycling	Men's Sprint 1000m
Gold	Bill Heseltine	Cycling	Men's 10 mile Scratch
Gold	Hector Sutherland	Cycling	Men's Road Road Race
Gold	Allan Jay; Ivan Lund; Charles Stanmore	Fencing	Men's Épée Team
Gold	Mervyn Wood	Rowing	Men's Single Sculls
Gold	Mervyn Wood; Murray Riley	Rowing	Men's Double Sculls
Gold	Wal Lambert; Jack Webster	Rowing	Men's Coxless Pair
Gold	Alan Brown, Bruce Goswell, Edward Pain, Eric Longley, James Barnes, Peter Holmes a Court; Phil Cayzer, Bob Tinning, Ross Selman	Rowing	Men's Eights
Gold	Garrick Agnew	Swimming	Men's 440 yards Freestyle
Gold	David Hawkins	Swimming	Men's 220 yards Breaststroke
Gold	Marjorie McQuade	Swimming	Women's 110 yards Freestyle
Gold	Judy-Joy Davies	Swimming	Women's 110 yards Backstroke
Gold	Denise Spencer; Denise Norton; Judy-Joy Davies; Marjorie McQuade	Swimming	Women's 4×110 yd freestyle relay
Gold	Judy-Joy Davies; Marjorie McQuade; Nancy Lyons	Swimming	Women's 3×110 yd medley relay
Gold	John Amadee, Peter Bennett, Bruce Bourke, John Bourke, Herman Doerner, Owen Doerner; Ronald Faulds, Colin French, Kevin Hallett, Malcolm Hastie, Percy Johnston, James McKay; Francis Murphy, Frank O'Neill	Water polo	Men's Team
Gold	Bert Harris	Wrestling	Men's Flyweight
Gold	Dick Garrard	Wrestling	Men's Lightweight
Gold	Jim Armstrong	Wrestling	Men's Heavyweight
Silver	William de Gruchy	Athletics	Men's 100 yards
Silver	David Johnson	Athletics	Men's 220 yards
Silver	Ray Weinberg	Athletics	Men's 120 yards Hurdles
Silver	Les McKeand	Athletics	Men's Triple Jump
Silver	Keith Pardon	Athletics	Men's Hammer Throw
Silver	Shirley Strickland	Athletics	Women's 100 yards
Silver	Shirley Strickland	Athletics	Women's 220 yards
Silver	Judy Canty	Athletics	Women's Long Jump
Silver	Billy Barber	Boxing	Men's Lightweight
Silver	Bill Seewitz	Boxing	Men's Welterweight
Silver	Sid Cousins	Boxing	Men's Heavyweight
Silver	Sid Patterson	Cycling	Men's Time Trial
Silver	Sid Patterson	Cycling	Men's Sprint 1000m
Silver	Russell Mockridge	Cycling	Men's Individual Pursuit 4000m
Silver	Noeline MacLean	Diving	Women's 3m Springboard
Silver	Gwen Fawcett	Diving	Women's 10m Platform
Silver	John Fethers	Fencing	Men's Foil
Silver	Albert Newton	Lawn bowls	Men's Singles
Silver	Charles Cordaiy; James Cobley; John Cobley; Len Knight	Lawn bowls	Men's Fours
Silver	Leslie Montgomery; Erwin Elder; Cecil Winkworth; Kenneth Gee; Kevin Fox	Rowing	Men's Coxed Four
Silver	Frank O'Neill	Swimming	Men's 110 yards Freestyle
Silver	Barrie Kellaway; Garrick Agnew; Frank O'Neill; James Beard	Swimming	Men's 4×110 yd freestyle relay
Silver	Nancy Lyons	Swimming	Women's 220 yards Breaststroke
Silver	Ray Magee	Weightlifting	Men's Heavyweight
Silver	Jim Chapman	Wrestling	Men's Bantamweight
Silver	Jack Little	Wrestling	Men's Welterweight
Silver	Bruce Arthur	Wrestling	Men's Middleweight
Bronze	Geoff Goodacre	Athletics	Men's 440 yards Hurdles
Bronze	Ian Polmear	Athletics	Men's Triple Jump
Bronze	Herb Barker	Athletics	Men's Hammer Throw
Bronze	Peter Denton	Athletics	Men's Pole Vault
Bronze	Verna Johnston	Athletics	Women's 100 yards
Bronze	Jack Taylor	Boxing	Men's Light Heavyweight
Bronze	Ken Caves	Cycling	Men's 10 mile Scratch
Bronze	Jack Fowler	Cycling	Men's Road Road Race
Bronze	Frank Murphy	Diving	Men's 10m Platform
Bronze	Noeline MacLean	Diving	Women's 10m Platform
Bronze	Ivan Lund	Fencing	Men's Épée
Bronze	Norman Booth; Leslie Chillug; Edwin Dean; Jock Gibson	Fencing	Men's Sabre Team
Bronze	Catherine Pym	Fencing	Women's Foil
Bronze	Ron Sharpe	Swimming	Men's 220 yards Breaststroke
Bronze	Denise Norton	Swimming	Women's 440 yards Freestyle
Bronze	Keith Caple	Weightlifting	Men's Bantamweight
Bronze	Vern Barberis	Weightlifting	Men's Lightweight
Bronze	Fred Griffin	Weightlifting	Men's Middleweight
Bronze	Tom Trevaskis	Wrestling	Men's Middleweight

Medals by sport
Sport	1st place, gold medalist(s)	2nd place, silver medalist(s)	3rd place, bronze medalist(s)	
Athletics	15	8	5	28
Swimming	6	3	2	11
Cycling	4	3	2	9
Rowing	4	1	0	5
Wrestling	3	3	1	7
Fencing	1	1	3	5
Water polo	1	0	0	1
Boxing	0	3	1	4
Diving	0	2	2	4
Lawn bowls	0	2	0	2
Weightlifting	0	1	3	4
Total	34	27	19	80

== Team management ==
Honorary General Manager – Harold Wilkes
Section Officials: Athletics Manager – Leonad Curnow, Athletics Manageress – Lillian Neville; Boxing & Wrestling Manager – Ralph Jackson; Cycling Manager – John Meagher; Lawn Bowls Manager – Albert Newton; Rowing Manager – Edward Kenny; Rowing Coxed Four Coach – John Eddie, Rowing Eights Coach – William Godfrey Thomas; Swimming Manager – Roy Thompson, Swimming Assistant Manager – Joseph Emerson; Swimming Manageress – Margot Long, Swimming Coaches – Forbes Carlile, William Holland; Diving Coaches – Allan Mott, Leonard Warner; Water Polo Manager – Bill Berge Phillips; Weightlifting Manager

== See also ==
- Australia at the 1948 Summer Olympics
- Australia at the 1952 Summer Olympics
