= Athletics at the 1950 British Empire Games – Women's 220 yards =

Women's 220 yards at the Commonwealth Games

The men's 220 yards event at the 1950 British Empire Games was held on 7 and 9 February at the Eden Park in Auckland, New Zealand.

== Medalists ==
Gold	Silver	Bronze
Marjorie Jackson; Australia	Shirley Strickland; Australia	Daphne Robb; South Africa

== Results ==
=== Heats ===
Held on 7 February

Qualification: First 3 in each heat (Q) qualify directly for the semifinals.

Rank	Heat	Name	Nationality	Time	Notes
1	1	Marjorie Jackson	Australia	24.8	Q
2	1	Ann Shanley	Australia	25.3	Q
3	1	Lesley Rowe	New Zealand	25.5	Q
4	1	Eleanor McKenzie	Canada	??.?	
5	1	Elaine Silburn	Canada	??.?	
6	1	Margaret Walker	England	??.?	
1	2	Shirley Strickland	Australia	25.3	Q
2	2	Sylvia Cheeseman	England	25.8	Q
3	2	Joan Hart	New Zealand	25.9	Q
4	2	Peggy Moore	Canada	??.?	
5	2	Doris Batter	England	??.?	
1	3	Daphne Robb	South Africa	25.0	Q
2	3	Dorothea Parker	New Zealand	25.4	Q
3	3	Verna Johnston	Australia	25.4	Q
4	3	Dorothy Manley	England	??.?	
5	3	Colleen Malone	New Zealand	??.?	
6	3	Viola Myers	Canada	??.?	

=== Semifinals ===
Held on 7 February

Qualification: First 3 in each heat (Q) qualify directly for the final.

Rank	Heat	Name	Nationality	Time	Notes
1	1	Marjorie Jackson	Australia	24.9	Q
2	1	Verna Johnston	Australia	25.6	Q
3	1	Lesley Rowe	New Zealand	25.8	Q
4	1	Sylvia Cheeseman	England	??.?	
5	1	Joan Hart	New Zealand	??.?	
1	2	Shirley Strickland	Australia	24.6	Q, GR
2	2	Daphne Robb	South Africa	24.9	Q
3	2	Dorothea Parker	New Zealand	25.1	Q
4	2	Ann Shanley	Australia	25.2e	

=== Final ===
Held on 9 February

Rank	Lane	Name	Nationality	Time	Notes
1st place, gold medalist(s)	5	Marjorie Jackson	Australia	24.3	=WR
2nd place, silver medalist(s)	4	Shirley Strickland	Australia	24.5	
3rd place, bronze medalist(s)	1	Daphne Robb	South Africa	24.7	
4	2	Dorothea Parker	New Zealand	24.8e	
5	3	Verna Johnston	Australia	25.3e	
6	6	Lesley Rowe	New Zealand	??.?	
