= Athletics at the 1950 British Empire Games – Women's 100 yards =

Women's 100 yards at the Commonwealth Games

The women's 100 yards event at the 1950 British Empire Games was held on 5 February at the Eden Park in Auckland, New Zealand.

== Medalists ==
Gold	Silver	Bronze
Marjorie Jackson; Australia	Shirley Strickland; Australia	Verna Johnston; Australia

== Results ==
=== Heats ===
Qualification: First 3 in each heat (Q) qualify directly for the semifinals.

Rank	Heat	Name	Nationality	Time	Notes
1	1	Marjorie Jackson	Australia	10.8	Q, =WR
2	1	Shirley Hardman	New Zealand	??.?	Q
3	1	Ann Shanley	Australia	11.2	Q
4	1	Eleanor McKenzie	Canada	11.4e	
5	1	Doris Batter	England	??.?	
6	1	Viola Myers	Canada	??.?	
1	2	Shirley Strickland	Australia	10.9	Q
2	2	Sylvia Cheeseman	England	??.?	Q
3	2	Colleen Malone	New Zealand	??.?	Q
4	2	Margaret Walker	England	??.?	
5	2	Geraldine Bemister	Canada	??.?	
1	3	Verna Johnston	Australia	11.1	Q
2	3	Ruth Dowman	New Zealand	??.?	Q
3	3	Dorothea Parker	New Zealand	??.?	Q
4	3	Daphne Robb	South Africa	??.?	
5	3	Dorothy Manley	England	??.?	
6	3	Patricia Jones	Canada	??.?	

=== Semifinals ===
Qualification: First 3 in each heat (Q) qualify directly for the final.

Rank	Heat	Name	Nationality	Time	Notes
1	1	Marjorie Jackson	Australia	10.9	Q
2	1	Verna Johnston	Australia	11.1	Q
3	1	Dorothea Parker	New Zealand	??.?	Q
4	1	Sylvia Cheeseman	England	11.6e	
5	1	Colleen Malone	New Zealand	11.6e	
1	2	Shirley Strickland	Australia	10.9	Q
2	2	Ann Shanley	Australia	11.2	Q
3	2	Shirley Hardman	New Zealand	??.?	Q
4	2	Ruth Dowman	New Zealand	11.3e	

=== Final ===
Rank	Lane	Name	Nationality	Time	Notes
1st place, gold medalist(s)	1	Marjorie Jackson	Australia	10.8	=WR
2nd place, silver medalist(s)	2	Shirley Strickland	Australia	11.0	
3rd place, bronze medalist(s)	4	Verna Johnston	Australia	11.1	
4	5	Dorothea Parker	New Zealand	11.2	
5	6	Shirley Hardman	New Zealand	11.3	
6	2	Ann Shanley	Australia	11.4	
