= Athletics at the 1950 British Empire Games – Women's 220–110–220–110 yards relay =

The women's 220–110–220–110 yards relay event at the 1950 British Empire Games was held on 11 February at the Eden Park in Auckland, New Zealand. It was the last time this relay was contested at the Games, later being replaced with the 4 × 440 yards relay.

== Results ==
Rank	Nation	Athletes	Time	Notes
1st place, gold medalist(s)	Australia	Ann Shanley, Marjorie Jackson, Shirley Strickland, Verna Johnston	1:13.4	GR
2nd place, silver medalist(s)	England	Doris Batter, Dorothy Manley, Margaret Walker, Sylvia Cheeseman	1:17.5	
3rd place, bronze medalist(s)	Canada	Elaine Silburn, Eleanor McKenzie, Gerry Bemister, Patricia Jones	?:??.?	
	New Zealand	Lesley Rowe, Dorothea Parker, Ruth Dowman, Shirley Hardman	DQ	
