= Athletics at the 1950 British Empire Games – Women's 110–220–110 yards relay =

The women's 110–220–110 yards relay event at the 1950 British Empire Games was held on 11 February at the Eden Park in Auckland, New Zealand. It was the last time this relay was contested at the Games, later being replaced with the 4 × 110 yards relay.

== Results ==
Rank	Nation	Athletes	Time	Notes
1st place, gold medalist(s)	Australia	Marjorie Jackson, Shirley Strickland, Verna Johnston	47.9	GR
2nd place, silver medalist(s)	New Zealand	Lesley Rowe, Dorothea Parker, Shirley Hardman	48.7	
3rd place, bronze medalist(s)	England	Dorothy Manley, Margaret Walker, Sylvia Cheeseman	50.0	
4	Canada	Eleanor McKenzie, Geraldine Bemister, Peggy Moore	??.?	
