= Athletics at the 1950 British Empire Games – Men's 4 × 440 yards relay =

Men's 4 × 440 yards relay at the Commonwealth Games

The men's 4 × 440 yards relay event at the 1950 British Empire Games was held on 11 February at the Eden Park in Auckland, New Zealand.

== Results ==
Rank	Nation	Athletes	Time	Notes
1st place, gold medalist(s)	Australia	Edwin Carr, George Gedge, James Humphreys, Ross Price	3:17.8	
2nd place, silver medalist(s)	England	Derek Pugh, John Parlett, Leslie Lewis, Terry Higgins	3:19.3	
3rd place, bronze medalist(s)	New Zealand	David Batten, Derek Steward, John Holland, Jack Sutherland	3:20.0	
4	Ceylon	A. Somapala, Duncan White, John De Saram, Oscar Wijeyasinghe	3:22.8	
	Canada	Bill Parnell, Don Pettie, Jack Hutchins, Bill LaRochelle	?:??.?	
