= Canada at the 1950 British Empire Games =

- CG code: CAN

in Auckland, New Zealand
- Medals Ranked 4th: Gold 8 Silver 9 Bronze 14 Total 31

British Empire Games appearances
- 1930; 1934; 1938; 1950; 1954; 1958; 1962; 1966; 1970; 1974; 1978; 1982; 1986; 1990; 1994; 1998; 2002; 2006; 2010; 2014; 2018; 2022; 2026; 2030

Other related appearances
- Newfoundland (1930, 1934)

Canada took part at the 1950 British Empire Games in Auckland (New Zealand). With a total of 31 medals, Canada ranked fourth on the medal tally.

== Medals ==
	(gold)	(silver)	(bronze)	Total
Canada	8	9	14	31

== Individual medals ==
=== Gold ===
Athletics:

- Bill Parnell, Men's 1 mile
- Leo Roininen, Men's Javelin Throw

Diving:

- George Athans, Men's 3 m springboard

Swimming:

- Peter Salmon, Men's 110 yards freestyle

Weightlifting:

- Gerry Gratton, Men's Middleweight Division
- Jim Varaleau, Men's Light Heavyweight Division

Wrestling:

- Henry Hudson, Men's Welterweight Division
- Maurice Vachon, Men's Middleweight Division

=== Silver ===
Athletics:

- Jack Hutchins, Men's 880 yards
- Stan Egerton, Men's Pole vault

Diving:

- George Athans, Men's 10 m Platform

Fencing:

- Men's sabre team

Swimming:

- Jim Portelance, Men's 1650 yards freestyle
- Men's 3×110 yards medley relay team

Weightlifting:

- Rosaire Smith, Men's Bantamweight Division

Wrestling:

- Roland Milord, Men's Featherweight Division
- Morgan Plumb, Men's Lightweight Division

=== Bronze ===
Athletics:

- Don Pettie, Men's 100 yards
- Bill Parnell, Men's 880 yards
- Leo Roininen, Men's Shot Put
- Svein Sigfusson, Men's Discus throw
- Doug Robinson, Men's Javelin throw
- Women's 220-110-220-110 yards relay team

Boxing:

- Len Walters, Men's Bantamweight
- Eddie Haddad, Men's Lightweight
- Bill Pinkus, Men's Middleweight

Diving:

- Lynda Hunt, Women's 3 m Springboard

Fencing:

- Georges Pouliot, Men's Foil
- Men's Foil team
- Men's Épée team
- Georges Pouliot, Men's Sabre
