= Athletics at the 1950 British Empire Games – Men's 440 yards =

Men's 440 yards at the Commonwealth Games

The men's 440 yards event at the 1950 British Empire Games was held on 9 and 11 February at the Eden Park in Auckland, New Zealand.

== Medalists ==
Gold	Silver	Bronze
Edwin Carr; Australia	Leslie Lewis; England	David Batten; New Zealand

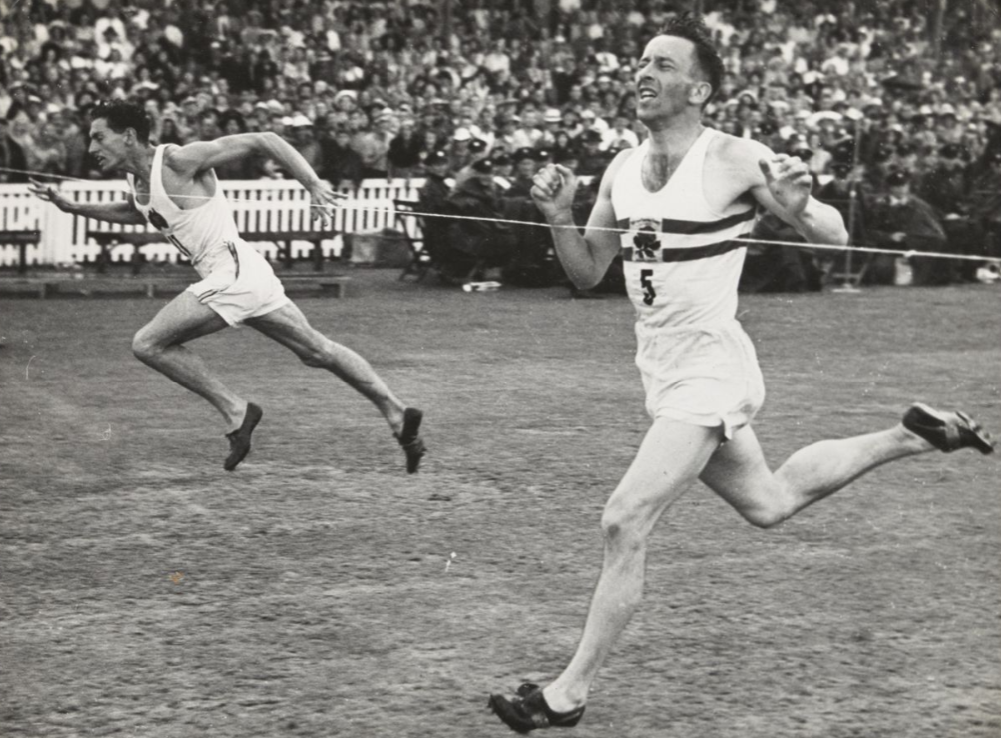
1950 Empire Games 440 yards final, Edwin Carr (left), Leslie Lewis (right)

== Results ==
=== Heats ===
Held on 9 February

Qualification: First 3 in each heat (Q) qualify directly for the semifinals.

Rank	Heat	Name	Nationality	Time	Notes
1	1	Edwin Carr	Australia	48.6	Q
2	1	Derek Pugh	England	48.9	Q
3	1	Dave Batten	New Zealand	48.9	Q
4	1	George Gedge	Australia	49.0e	
	1	Ezra Henniger	Canada	DNF	
	1	Vivian Blaze	Ceylon	DNS	
1	2	Leslie Lewis	England	48.8	Q
2	2	James Humphreys	Australia	49.6	Q
3	2	Jack Sutherland	New Zealand	50.3	Q
4	2	Harold Whittle	England	??.?	
5	2	Bill LaRochelle	Canada	??.?	
1	3	Terry Higgins	England	49.0	Q
2	3	Ross Price	Australia	49.3	Q
3	3	John Myles	New Zealand	??.?	Q
	3	Schalk Booysen	South Africa	DQ	
	1	Doug Harris	New Zealand	DNS	

=== Semifinals ===
Held on 9 February

Qualification: First 3 in each heat (Q) qualify directly for the final.

Rank	Heat	Name	Nationality	Time	Notes
1	1	Edwin Carr	Australia	48.8	Q
2	1	Leslie Lewis	England	48.9	Q
3	1	Dave Batten	New Zealand	48.9	Q
4	1	James Humphreys	Australia	??.?	
5	1	John Myles	New Zealand	??.?	
1	2	Jack Sutherland	New Zealand	49.2	Q
2	2	Ross Price	Australia	49.4	Q
3	2	Derek Pugh	England	49.4	Q
4	2	Terry Higgins	England	??.?	

=== Final ===
Held on 11 February

Rank	Name	Nationality	Time	Notes
1st place, gold medalist(s)	Edwin Carr	Australia	47.9	=GR
2nd place, silver medalist(s)	Leslie Lewis	England	48.0	
3rd place, bronze medalist(s)	Dave Batten	New Zealand	48.8	
4	Derek Pugh	England	??.?	
5	Ross Price	Australia	??.?	
6	Jack Sutherland	New Zealand	??.?	
