= Athletics at the 1950 British Empire Games – Men's discus throw =

Men's discus throw at the Commonwealth Games

The men's discus throw event at the 1950 British Empire Games was held on 7 February at the Eden Park in Auckland, New Zealand.

== Results ==
Rank	Name	Nationality	Result	Notes
1st place, gold medalist(s)	Ian Reed	Australia	156 ft 7 in (47.73 m)	GR
2nd place, silver medalist(s)	Mataika Tuicakau	Fiji	144 ft 2 1/2 in (43.95 m)	
3rd place, bronze medalist(s)	Svein Sigfusson	Canada	142 ft 8 in (43.48 m)	
4	Keith Pardon	Australia	134 ft 10 in (41.10 m)	
5	Angus Redmond	New Zealand	132 ft 8 3/4 in (40.46 m)	
6	Ronald Trangmar	Southern Rhodesia	128 ft 9 in (39.24 m)	
7	Harold Moody	England	128 ft 2 in (39.07 m)	
8	Max Carr	New Zealand	126 ft 8 3/4 in (38.63 m)	
