= Athletics at the 1950 British Empire Games – Men's shot put =

Men's shot put at the Commonwealth Games

The men's shot put event at the 1950 British Empire Games was held on 9 February at the Eden Park in Auckland, New Zealand.

== Results ==
Rank	Name	Nationality	Result	Notes
1st place, gold medalist(s)	Mataika Tuicakau	Fiji	48 ft 0 1/4 in (14.64 m)	
2nd place, silver medalist(s)	Harold Moody	England	45 ft 8 in (13.92 m)	
3rd place, bronze medalist(s)	Leo Roininen	Canada	44 ft 10 1/2 in (13.68 m)	
4	Doug Herman	New Zealand	44 ft 0 in (13.41 m)	
5	K.J. Morgan	New Zealand	43 ft 10 in (13.36 m)	
6	C.L. Main	New Zealand	41 ft 4 in (12.60 m)	
7	Duncan Clark	Scotland	39 ft 7 1/2 in (12.08 m)	
8	Manasa Nukuvou	Fiji	39 ft 2 in (11.94 m)	
	Svein Sigfusson	Canada	DNS	
	Norman Drake	England	DNS	
