= Athletics at the 1950 British Empire Games – Men's hammer throw =

Men's hammer throw at the Commonwealth Games

The men's hammer throw event at the 1950 British Empire Games was held on 11 February at the Eden Park in Auckland, New Zealand.

== Results ==
Rank	Name	Nationality	Result	Notes
1st place, gold medalist(s)	Duncan Clark	Scotland	163 ft 10 1/4 in (49.94 m)	GR
2nd place, silver medalist(s)	Keith Pardon	Australia	156 ft 11 in (47.83 m)	
3rd place, bronze medalist(s)	Herb Barker	Australia	149 ft 8 in (45.62 m)	
4	Norman Drake	England	146 ft 11 in (44.78 m)	
5	Alan Fuller	New Zealand	143 ft 2 1/2 in (43.65 m)	
6	Max Carr	New Zealand	140 ft 6 3/4 in (42.84 m)	
7	Jim Leckie	New Zealand	136 ft 6 in (41.61 m)	
8	Keith Allen	Australia	135 ft 6 1/2 in (41.31 m)	
9	John Brown	New Zealand	135 ft 3 1/2 in (41.24 m)	
10	Svein Sigfusson	Canada	122 ft 2 1/2 in (37.25 m)	
