= Athletics at the 1950 British Empire Games – Men's triple jump =

Men's triple jump at the Commonwealth Games

The men's triple jump event at the 1950 British Empire Games was held on 9 February at the Eden Park in Auckland, New Zealand.

== Results ==
Rank	Name	Nationality	Result	Notes
1st place, gold medalist(s)	Brian Oliver	Australia	51 ft 2 1/2 in (15.61 m)	
2nd place, silver medalist(s)	Les McKeand	Australia	50 ft 1 3/4 in (15.28 m)	
3rd place, bronze medalist(s)	Ian Polmear	Australia	48 ft 1 3/4 in (14.67 m)	
4	Roy Johnson	New Zealand	47 ft 7 1/2 in (14.52 m)	
5	Keith Forsythe	New Zealand	46 ft 7 3/4 in (14.22 m)	
6	Graeme Jeffries	New Zealand	46 ft 2 3/4 in (14.09 m)	
7	Neville Price	South Africa	45 ft 11 1/4 in (14.00 m)	
8	Allan Lindsay	Scotland	45 ft 10 in (13.97 m)	
9	Colin Kay	New Zealand	45 ft 7 3/4 in (13.91 m)	
10	Harold Whittle	England	42 ft 3 3/4 in (12.90 m)	
	Mohamed Sheriff	Ceylon	DNS	
