= Athletics at the 1950 British Empire Games – Women's javelin throw =

Women's javelin throw at the Commonwealth Games

The women's javelin throw event at the 1950 British Empire Games was held on 9 February at the Eden Park in Auckland, New Zealand.

== Results ==
Rank	Name	Nationality	Result	Notes
1st place, gold medalist(s)	Charlotte MacGibbon	Australia	127 ft 5 1/4 in (38.84 m)	GR
2nd place, silver medalist(s)	Yvette Williams	New Zealand	124 ft 6 3/4 in (37.97 m)	
3rd place, bronze medalist(s)	Cleone Rivett-Carnac	New Zealand	112 ft 11 3/4 in (34.44 m)	
4	Dorothy Tyler	England	107 ft 9 1/4 in (32.85 m)	
5	Bertha Crowther	England	85 ft 4 1/4 in (26.02 m)	
