= Athletics at the 1950 British Empire Games – Women's long jump =

Women's long jump at the Commonwealth Games

The women's long jump event at the 1950 British Empire Games was held on 11 February at the Eden Park in Auckland, New Zealand.

== Results ==
Rank	Name	Nationality	Result	Notes
1st place, gold medalist(s)	Yvette Williams	New Zealand	19 ft 4 5/8 in (5.91 m)	GR
2nd place, silver medalist(s)	Judy Canty	Australia	18 ft 11 1/4 in (5.77 m)	
3rd place, bronze medalist(s)	Ruth Dowman	New Zealand	18 ft 10 in (5.74 m)	
4	Verna Johnston	Australia	18 ft 2 1/4 in (5.54 m)	
5	Elaine Silburn	Canada	17 ft 6 3/4 in (5.35 m)	
6	Emma Anderson	Scotland	17 ft 2 in (5.23 m)	
7	Rosella Thorne	Canada	17 ft 1 1/4 in (5.21 m)	
8	Dorothy Tyler	England	16 ft 8 1/2 in (5.09 m)	
9	Bertha Crowther	England	16 ft 3 3/4 in (4.97 m)	
10	Jean Desforges	England	16 ft 3 1/2 in (4.97 m)	
11	June Schoch	New Zealand	15 ft 3 3/4 in (4.67 m)	
