= Athletics at the 1950 British Empire Games – Men's 120 yards hurdles =

Men's 120 yards hurdles at the Commonwealth Games

The men's 120 yards hurdles event at the 1950 British Empire Games was held on 9 February at the Eden Park in Auckland, New Zealand.

== Medalists ==
Gold	Silver	Bronze
Peter Gardner; Australia	Ray Weinberg; Australia	Tom Lavery; South Africa

== Results ==
=== Heats ===
Qualification: First 3 in each heat (Q) qualify directly for the final.

Rank	Heat	Name	Nationality	Time	Notes
1	1	Ray Weinberg	Australia	14.4	Q, GR
2	1	Don Finlay	England	14.8	Q
3	1	John Holland	New Zealand	15.1	Q
4	1	Alan Hill	New Zealand	??.?	
5	1	John Hart	Scotland	??.?	
	1	Christian de Jongh	South Africa	DNS	
1	2	Peter Gardner	Australia	14.5	Q
2	2	Tom Lavery	South Africa	14.6	Q
3	2	Lionel Smith	New Zealand	14.8	Q
4	2	Lloyd Valberg	Malaya	??.?	
5	2	Gordon Crosby	Canada	??.?	
	2	Duncan White	Ceylon	DNS	

=== Final ===
Rank	Lane	Name	Nationality	Time	Notes
1st place, gold medalist(s)	5	Peter Gardner	Australia	14.3	GR
2nd place, silver medalist(s)	1	Ray Weinberg	Australia	14.4	
3rd place, bronze medalist(s)	6	Tom Lavery	South Africa	14.6	
4	2	Don Finlay	England	14.7	
5	4	John Holland	New Zealand	??.?	
6	3	Lionel Smith	New Zealand	??.?	
