= Shirley Ogle =

Australian sprinter (1926–2021)

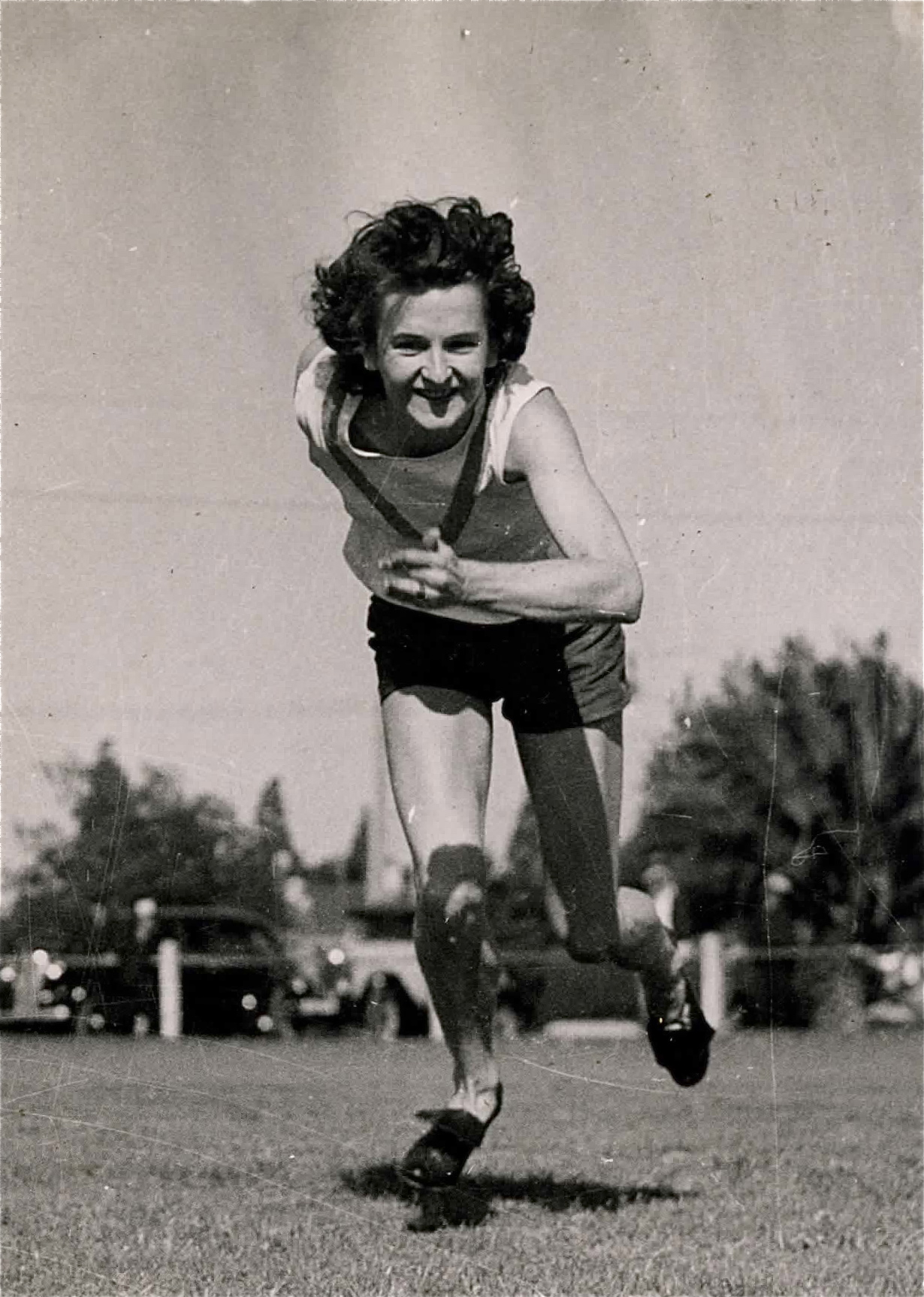

Personal information
- Full name: Shirley Weinberg
- Nationality: Australia
- Born: Shirley Ogle; May 9, 1926 Fawkner, Victoria, Australia
- Died: 20 April 2021 (aged 94) Ballarat, Victoria

Sport
- Sport: Track and Field
- Event(s): 75 yards 100 yards 220 yards 440 yards
- Club: Southport
- Coached by: Bill Ogle (Father)

Shirley Lavina Louise Weinberg (née Ogle; 9 May 1926 – 20 April 2021) was an Australian former athlete who competed in the 100 yards and 220 yards and other sprint distances. She held numerous state and national women's sprint records, and at the 1947 Victorian Athletics Championships won all four sprint events, 75 yards through to 440 yards.

== Early life ==
Ogle was born in the Melbourne suburb of Fawkner in Victoria. Her parents were William "Billy" Ogle, a professional bike rider and process engraver, and "Peggy" Martin, a stage performer.

She attended scholastically elite University High School where her athletic prowess stood out, her small stature and slight build notwithstanding. She joined Southport Athletic Club and competed in a wide range of events, including the discus, in which she won one of many club junior championships.

== Athletic career ==
Ogle's athletic career happened to coincide with the period when Australian women sprinters were at their most dominant.

Not having much big race experience at all, Ogle didn't perform up to her best at the Women's 1948 Olympic Selection Athletics Trials in Sydney and didn't make the team for London . She was 5th in the 100 yards, with the first four, Joyce King, Shirley Strickland, Betty McKinnon and June Matson making up the Women's 4 x 100 metre relay which won the silver medal. She was 5th in the 220 yards too, behind Joyce King, future multiple Olympic Champion and world recordholder, Shirley Strickland, Betty McKinnon and, another future multiple Olympic Champion and world recordholder, Marjorie Jackson. Competition for a spot on the sprint team was obviously pretty tough, with Joyce King and Shirley Strickland being the 1st. and 2nd. ranked of all the athletes from all the sports that had been presented by their sports associations to the Australian Olympic Federation for grading and selection in the Australian 1948 Summer Olympics team.

The strength of Australia's women in athletics at the time was further demonstrated by their results in the 1950 Commonwealth Games in Auckland where they won every event, except the High Jump and Long Jump.

== Additional information ==
In 1950, she married Australian Olympian Hurdler Ray Weinberg and supported his efforts in making the 1952 Summer Olympics team and was integral in the success of his other ventures in athletics. She'd also assisted him with his 1948 London Olympics programme where, even though visiting Olympic teams had to provide their own food due to post-war privations, she supplemented that with food packages, including eggs in the form of a special homemade Advocaat.

Shirley and Ray have three children.

== Statistics ==
Records

Event	Record	Place	Date
100y	Australian	Wangaratta, Australia	7 January 1948
220y	South Australian	Adelaide, Australia	1947
100y	Victorian	Melbourne, Australia	1948
220y	Victorian	Melbourne, Australia	1948

State championships

Year	State	Event	Place	Time
1945	Victoria	220y	1st.	26.4
1946	Victoria	220y	1st.	
		440y	1st.	61.3
		4 x 100y Relay	1st.	
1947	Victoria	75y	1st.	
		100y	1st.	11.0w
		220y	1st.	25.9
		440y	1st.	
	South Australia	220y	1st.	25.8
