= Polmear =

Polmear may refer to:

- Polmear, Cornwall, a hamlet between Par and Fowey in Cornwall, UK
- 21585 Polmear, a main-belt asteroid (1998 SX126)
- Ian Polmear (1928–2025), Australian metallurgist and academic
