= Joan Hart (sprinter) =

New Zealand sprinter (1925–2006)

Joan Davidson
Personal information
- Born: Irene Joan Hart; 30 August 1925
- Died: 23 September 2006 (aged 81)

Sport
- Country: New Zealand
- Sport: Track and field

Achievements and titles
- National finals: 75 yards champion (1945); 100 yards champion (1945); 220 yards champion (1945, 1946)

Irene Joan Davidson (née Hart, 30 August 1925 – 23 September 2006) was a New Zealand sprinter who, as Joan Hart, represented her country at the 1950 British Empire Games.

== Biography ==
Hart was born on 30 August 1925, the daughter of Frederick Henry Hart, and attended Motumaoho School, near Morrinsville. She showed early promise as a sprinter as a 13-year-old, finishing third in a 100 yards invitational handicap race at Morrinsville in March 1939, behind the Australian, Decima Norman, who equalled the world record, and Doreen Lumley.

In 1940, Hart won the junior girls' athletics championship at Hamilton Technical High School, breaking records for the triple jump, long jump and the 100 yards, recording a time of 12 seconds for the latter event. In 1941, she set a school record of 14.2 seconds for the 120 yards, and equalled the senior girls' record of 11.8 seconds for 100 yards. The same year, Hart won three Waikato athletics titles, and was a member of the Auckland women's athletics team that won the New Zealand women's athletics championship. Later in 1941, the Hart family left the Morrinsville district, moving to a farm near Hamilton.

In 1942, Hart recorded a time of 11.6 seconds in winning the girls' senior 100 yards representing Hamilton Technical High at the Waikato Secondary Schools' athletics meet. The following year, she won both the women's 100 yards and 220 yards titles at the Auckland provincial athletics championships. In 1944, Hart won the Auckland provincial 75 years, 100 yards, and 220 yards titles: her time of 8.8 seconds for the 75 yards equalled the New Zealand record set in 1939 by Doreen Lumley, while she recorded 11.4 seconds and 27.4 seconds, respectively, for the 100 yards and 220 yards. At the 1945 Auckland championships, Hart won the 75 yards title in a time of 9.0 seconds, placed second in the 220 yards, and third in the 100 yards.

Owing to World War II, the national athletics championships were not held between 1941 and 1944, but in 1945 Hart dominated the women's sprint races, winning the 75 yards, 100 yards, and 220 yards titles, representing Auckland. Her time of 25.8 seconds in the 220 yards was a personal best. The next year, she won the 220 yards championship. At the 1950 New Zealand athletics championships, Hart set a new national record of 24.9 seconds in her heat of the 220 yards. However, the mark was lowered to 24.8 seconds by Lesley Rowe in the next heat, and in the final heat Dorothea Parker also ran a time of 24.8 seconds. The final was won by Parker in 24.7 seconds, with Rowe second and Hart third.

Hart, Parker and Rowe all represented New Zealand in the women's 220 yards at the 1950 British Empire Games in Auckland. Hart finished third in her heat, recording a time of 25.9 seconds, but was fifth in her semifinal and did not progress further.

Hart went on to marry Brian Davidson. In later life, she lived in Waipukurau. She died on 23 September 2006, and her body was cremated in Hastings.
