= Charles Rivett-Carnac (sailor) =

British sailor

Medal record

Sailing

Representing Great Britain

Olympic Games
Gold medal – first place	1908 London	7 Metre

Charles James Rivett-Carnac (18 February 1853 in Brahmapur, Orissa, British India – 9 September 1935 in Jersey, Channel Islands) was a British sailor who competed in the 1908 Summer Olympics.

He was the owner of the British boat Heroine III, which won the gold medal in the 7 metre class. However, since it was the only entry in this class, this feat is somewhat less impressive. More importantly, his second wife Frances Rivett-Carnac was one of the four-member crew and won Olympic gold with him. The Rivett-Carnacs thus became the first husband-and-wife team to share Olympic gold. Their granddaughter Cleone Rivett-Carnac was an athlete in New Zealand. Rivett-Carnac remains the oldest Briton, at 55, to have won an Olympic gold medal for yachting.

== Family ==
He was a member of the Rivett-Carnac family and grandson of Sir James Rivett-Carnac, sometime governor of Bombay Presidency in British India.

Rivett-Carnac was the eldest son of Charles Forbes Rivett-Carnac (1824–1902), fourth but third surviving son of the first baronet, and Flora Elizabeth Baker. He was twice married, first in 1877 to Laura Marion Margaret Ogilvie (d. 19 June 1905), daughter of Colonel J.S. Ogilvie. They had one son Vernon Charles. He then married 5 July 1906 Frances Clytie Greenstock, daughter of Rev. Canon William Greenstock, sometime chaplain of Christ Church Bangkok. They had issue of four sons: Douglas, Charles, Louis and Clive. His wife participated in his gold-medal run for the 7 metre class in sailing in the 1908 Summer Olympics.

Rivett-Carnac was schooled at Rugby. He then returned to India to join the Indian Civil Service and married in 1877 the daughter of an Indian Army colonel. He left the ICS in 1897 and was appointed Accountant General to Burma. The following year, his services were placed at the disposal of the King of Siam by the British Government and for seven years he was the Financial Advisor to the Siamese Government, and Accountant and Comptroller General from 1900 – 1902. On his return to England in 1905, he continued to serve Siam as their Financial Agent in Europe. It is not known when he retired from that position.

== Sources ==
- Genealogy and family details. This site provides his family history and his second wife's details.
- Charles Rivett-Carnac at Olympics at Sports-Reference.com (archived). Mentions his family's prominence in British India. This profile provides much of his career information.
