= Sailing at the 1908 Summer Olympics – 7 Metre =

Sailing at the Olympics

7 Metre at the Games of the IV Olympiad
- Line drawing of a 7-Metre yacht from 1908
- Venue: Royal Victoria Yacht Club, Ryde
- Dates: First race: July 27, 1908; Last race: July 29, 1908
- Competitors: 4 male & 1 female (Documented) from 1 nation
- Teams: 2

Medalists
1st place, gold medalist(s)		Charles Rivett-Carnac, Norman Bingley, Richard Dixon, Frances Rivett-Carnac	Great Britain

The 7 Metre was a sailing event on the Sailing at the 1908 Summer Olympics program in Ryde. Three races were scheduled. Each nation could enter up to 2 boats. 5 sailors, on 2 boats, from 1 nation registered for competition.

== Race schedule ==
●	Event competitions	●	Event finals

Date	July					August											
Date	27 Mon	28 Tue	29 Wed	30 Thu	31 Fri	1 Sat	2 Sun	3 Mon	4 Tue	5 Wed	6 Thu	7 Fri	8 Sat	9 Sun	10 Mon	11 Tue	12 Wed
7-Metre	●	●	●														
Total gold medals			1														

== Course area ==
The following course was used during the 1908 Olympic 7-Metre regattas in all three races:

- Start at Ryde Pier
- №2. Mother Bank Buoy
- East Measured Mile Buoy
- East Sturbridge Buoy
- Finish at Ryde Pier

Two rounds for a total of 13 nautical miles (24 km) were scheduled.

1908 Olympic Course Area, Ryde
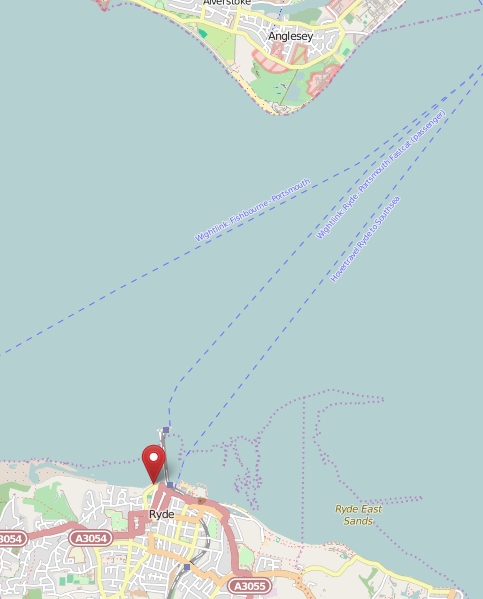

== Weather conditions ==
Date	Race	Description	Sea	Wind direction	Start
27-JUL-1908	1	Light wind. More wind in the second round	Calm	to	12:15
28-JUL-1908	2	Extreme light wind.	death calm		12:15

== Final results ==
The 1908 Olympic scoring system was used.

Rank	Country	Helmsman	Crew	Boat	Race 1		Race 2		Total
Rank	Country	Helmsman	Crew	Boat	Pos.	Pts.	Pos.	Pts.	Total
1	Great Britain	Charles Rivett-Carnac	Norman Bingley; Richard Dixon; Frances Rivett-Carnac	Heroine	1	3	1	3	2 first places
2	Great Britain	R. Sloane-Stanley	Unknown (Not documented)	Mignonette	DNC	-	DNC	-	-

Legend: DNC – Did not come to the starting area;
Gender: – male; – female;

== Notes ==
Two 7-Metre yachts were registered for the regattas of the 1908 Olympics. However, only one, Heroine, was present at the starting line. So she had each race a 'sail over'. Each match was therefore shortened to one round (6.5 nautical miles (12.0 km)). After 2 matches Heroine was certain of the victory and no third match was sailed.

== Other information ==
=== Extra award ===
Gilt commemorative medal:

- Charles Rivett-Carnac owner of Heroine
