= Ray Rosbrook =

Australian basketball coach

Golly Rosbrook
Personal information
- Nationality: Australian
- Born: Ray Norman Rosbrook; 1 January 1910 Queensland, Australia
- Died: 9 May 1979 (aged 69) Sydney, Australia
- Education: Ipswich Grammar School; Newington College; University of Sydney

Sport
- Sport: Basketball coach

Ray Norman Rosbrook (1910 – 5 September 1979) was an Australian basketball coach who was instrumental in the establishment of the game in New South Wales. He was an administrator and leading coach from the mid 1930s until 1950. In 2015 he was inducted into the NSW Basketball Hall of Fame.

== Biography ==
Rosbrook was born in Queensland in 1910 to parents Len and Maud. He attended Ipswich Grammar School before coming to Sydney to complete his high school education at Newington College (1924–1930). Always known as Golly he attended Newington in the last years of the headmastership of the Rev Dr Charles Prescott. He was a hurdler and rower and in 1929 and 1930 he stroked the Newington first eight at the AAGPS Head of the River Regatta on the Parramatta River. In his final school year he was Captain of Boats and a Prefect at Newington. He attended Sydney University without graduating and then joined the Sydney City Council in 1936 as the Moore Park playground supervisor. Between 1932 and 1945 he stroked winning eights at Sydney Rowing Club. In 1963 he escorted Queen Elizabeth II on an informal tour of the Moore Park playground. As a coach he influenced the sporting careers of sportsmen, such as Peter Mullins and Herb Barker, in a wide range of sports such as basketball, rugby league, rugby union and athletics. He was a successful basketball coach at state level from 1946 until 1950 and was a selector and manager for State representative teams. Rosbrook held administrative and development positions with the National Fitness Camp, Narrabeen, the YMCA Camp at Yarramundi, as a founder of the New South Wales Amateur Basketball Association, Amateur Athletics Association and the Drummoyne Rugby Union Club. He died in Sydney on 5 September 1979 and his ashes are at Northern Suburbs Memorial Gardens, North Ryde.
