= Doug Herman =

New Zealand rugby union player and shot putter

Personal information
- Born: Douglas Haig Herman; 18 March 1917 Canterbury, New Zealand
- Died: 20 September 1995 (aged 78)
- Weight: 96 kg (212 lb)

Rugby union career
- Position: Flanker
Provincial / State sides
Years	Team	Apps	(Points)
1937–1952	Canterbury	91	

Sport
- Country: New Zealand
- Sport: Track and field
- Event: Shot put

Achievements and titles
- National finals: Shot put champion (1938, 1939, 1945, 1946, 1950)

Douglas Haig Herman (18 March 1917 – 20 September 1995) was a New Zealand field athlete and rugby union player. He represented his country in the shot put at the 1950 British Empire Games, and captained the Canterbury provincial rugby team in the years following World War II. He played about 120 first-class rugby games, including 91 for Canterbury.

Herman won the New Zealand national shot put title on five occasions: in 1938, 1939, 1945, 1946, and 1950. In the shot put at the 1950 Empire Games, he achieved a best distance of 44 ft 0 in (13.41 m) to finish in fourth place.
