= Emma Anderson (long jumper) =

Scottish athlete

Personal information
- Nationality: British (Scottish)

Sport
- Sport: Athletics
- Event(s): Long jump, discus, javelin
- Club: Dumfries Athletic Club

Emma H. Anderson was a track and field athlete from Scotland who competed at the 1950 British Empire Games (now Commonwealth Games).

== Biography ==
Anderson was a member of the Dumfries Athletic Club who specialised in the long jump. She set a Scottish record of 17 feet, 10.5 inches, when becoming the WAAA champion of Scotland in 1949. Anderson finished runner-up behind fellow Scot Margaret Erskine at the 1949 WAAA Championships.

Anderson represented the Scottish Empire Games team at the 1950 British Empire Games in Auckland, New Zealand, participating in one event, the long jump.

Anderson was a physical education teacher at the Dumfries High School and also excelled in discus and javelin, winning the Scottish WAAA titles in 1951.
