= John Myles (athlete) =

New Zealand athlete

Personal information
- Born: John Gilbert Stratton Myles; 26 October 1926
- Died: 28 May 2013 (aged 86) Hamilton, New Zealand

Sport
- Country: New Zealand
- Sport: Track and field

John Gilbert Stratton Myles (26 October 1926 – 28 May 2013) was a New Zealand sprinter who represented his country at the 1950 British Empire Games.

== Early life ==
Born on 26 October 1926, Myles was educated at Mount Albert Grammar School in Auckland from 1941 to 1945 where he excelled at sports. He won the intermediate athletics cup in 1942, and the senior athletics cup in the following three years. He was a member of the school's 1st XI cricket team from 1943 to 1945, and the 1st XV rugby union side in 1944 and 1945. In his final year at Mount Albert Grammar, Myles was head prefect and a company sergeant major in the school's cadet unit.

== Sporting career ==
=== Athletics ===
At the Auckland secondary schools athletic championships in April 1945, Myles won the 100 yards in a time of 10.2 seconds, equalling the New Zealand junior record. He also won the 220 yards in 23.6 seconds and the 440 yards in 52.2 seconds, and was second in the 120 yards hurdles.

In 1949, Myles was a member of the New Zealand Universities' athletic team that travelled to Australia.

At the 1950 British Empire Games in Auckland, Myles competed in the 440 yards. He finished third in his heat, before placing fifth in his semifinal and not progressing further.

=== Rugby union ===
Myles played representative rugby union for Auckland. He later served as president of the University of Waikato Rugby Club from 1973 to 1974.

== Working life ==
After a period working for the New Zealand Forest Service, Myles trained as a teacher at the Auckland and Dunedin Teachers' Colleges. He worked as a physical education area officer before becoming a teacher at Auckland Normal Intermediate. He taught as his old school, Mount Albert Grammar, from 1957 to 1962, and coached the school's 1st XV rugby team. He graduated from the University of Auckland with a Bachelor of Arts degree in 1958 and a Master of Arts in geography in 1961. Myles then spent time teaching in Canada, before returning to New Zealand to become head of social studies at Hamilton Teachers' College, where he remained for the rest of his working life.

Myles died at Atawhai Assisi Hospital on the outskirts of Hamilton on 28 May 2013.
