= Norman Bingley =

English sailor (1863–1940)

Personal information
- Born: 17 September 1863
- Died: 16 January 1940 (aged 76)

Sailing career
- Sport: Sailing
Medal record
Sailing
Representing Great Britain
Olympic Games
Gold medal – first place	1908 London	7 Metre

Norman Bingley (17 September 1863 – 16 January 1940) was an English sailor and Olympic champion for Great Britain. He competed at the 1908 Summer Olympics in London and won a gold medal in the 7 metre class.
