= Ray Weinberg =

Australian athlete and coach (1926–2018)

Ray Weinberg AM
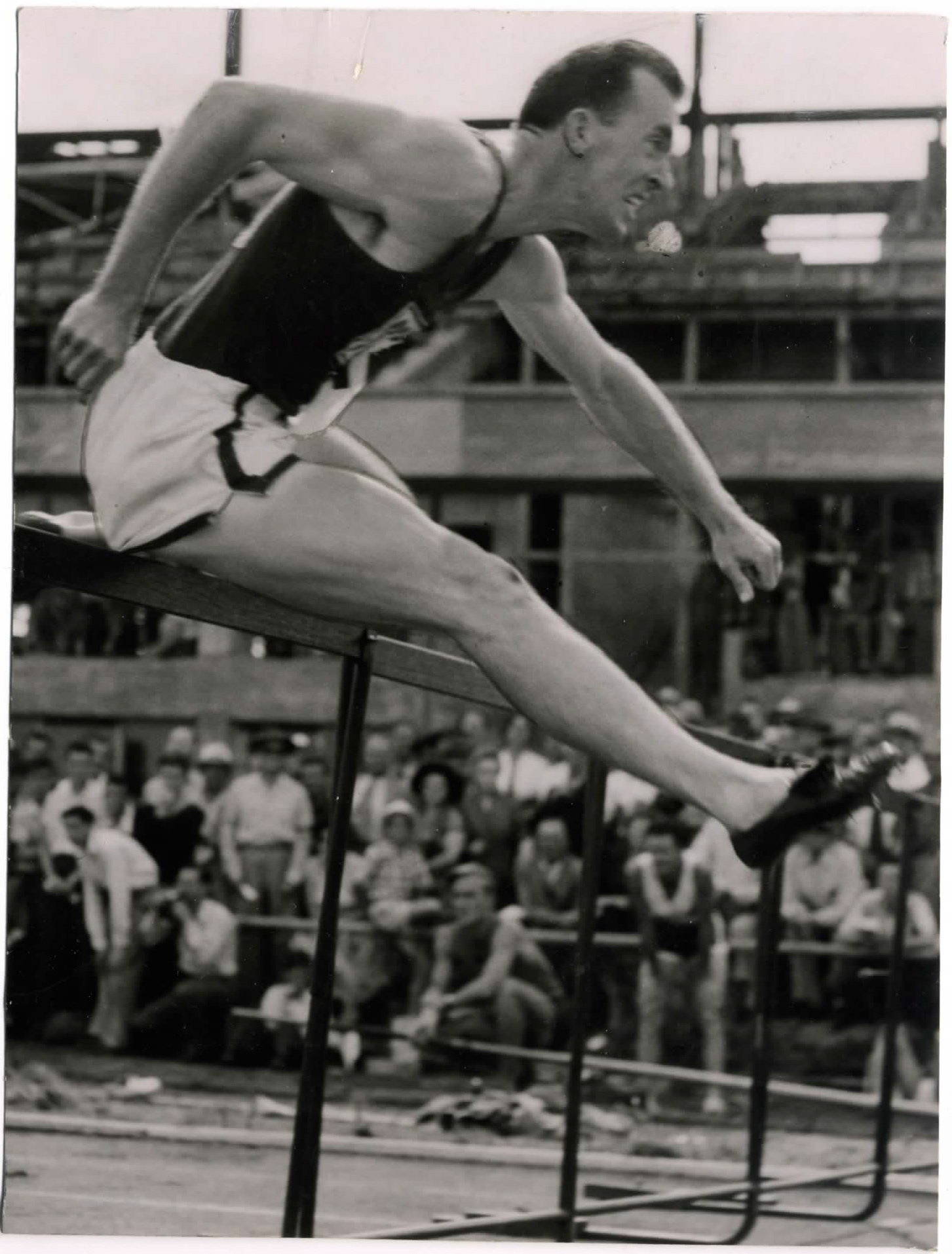

Personal information
- Nationality: Australian
- Born: 23 October 1926 Alexandra, Victoria, Australia
- Died: 30 May 2018 (aged 91) Ballarat, Victoria, Australia
- Height: 6 ft 2 in (188 cm)
- Weight: 179 lb (81 kg)

Sport
- Sport: Track and field
- Events: 110 metres hurdles 220 yards hurdles Decathlon
- Club: St. Stephen's Harriers

Achievements and titles
- Olympic finals: 110m hurdles - 1952
- Highest world ranking: 6
Medal record
Men's athletics
Representing Australia
Commonwealth Games
Silver medal – second place	1950 Auckland	120 yards hurdles

Raymond Henry Weinberg AM (23 October 1926 – 30 May 2018) was an Australian athlete and coach. He was one of Australia's finest hurdlers, being ranked in the Top 8 in the world for 4 years; an Olympic finalist; in 1952 having the fastest time in the world for 220 yards hurdles; and holding the national 110 metres hurdles record for 20 years. He also held the Victorian record in the decathlon. In addition, he created, designed and had manufactured the first Australian Olympic lapel pin.

== Background ==
Born on 23 October 1926 in the country town of Alexandra, Victoria, Weinberg attended Trinity Grammar School, where he was Captain of the School in 1944, as well as Captain of Football, Captain of Athletics, Captain of Swimming, Captain of Shooting and Captain of Lacrosse. He tried out with Victorian Football League club, Carlton but was convinced by his father to concentrate on athletics.

He married Shirley Ogle, Victorian state sprint champion and record holder. After they were married, they moved to Victorian country town Kerang, 200 kilometres north-west of Melbourne where he ran his parents' hotel, The Commercial Hotel, for over 20 years. This move necessitated training by himself, usually at the local Kerang airport (KRA) after closing the bar at his hotel. Weekend competition meant a 400+ kilometre round trip to Olympic Park in Melbourne.

Weinberg and his wife had three children – Raymond Brett (born 1953), Michelle Louise (born 1955) and Timothy David (born 1961). He died on 30 May 2018, at the age of 91.

== Athletic career ==
Weinberg started his athletics career in 1945 with the St Stephens Harriers. He was Victorian champion on nine occasions - with six victories in the 120 yards hurdles, one each over 220 yards and 440 yards hurdles and in 1953 in the decathlon. He also the South Australian short hurdles cham[pion in 1948. From the 1947–48 season to 1952–53 season, Weinberg won 5 National 120 yards hurdles championships, and in both 1946-47 and 1948-49 was second. In February 1952 he set the Australian Record for the 120 yards hurdles of 14.0 seconds, which stood until March 1972 when Mal Baird broke it, running 13.8 seconds. He held the Australian 120 yards and 110 metres Hurdles records on four occasions.

From the 1948–49 season to 1952–53, he won the National 220 yards hurdles championships twice (1950-51 24.0 seconds and 1951-52 23.8 seconds) and was second in two other years. In 1952, he held the fastest time in the world that year for the 220 yards hurdles. And was ranked in the Top 10 in the World over 110 metres hurdles in 1950 (6th), 1951 (8th), 1952 (6th) and 1953 (7th).

Weinberg was chosen to compete in the Australian Olympic Team for the 1948 Summer Olympic Games in London. He was ranked 23rd choice overall of athletes chosen by all sports, and sixth in the athletic team. The trip from Sydney to London was a five-day flight with each evening spent on the ground. He made the semi-final finishing 5th, just out of a qualifying place for the final, the winners running an Olympic Record time.

His trip home was on the S.S. Orantes, and he shared the voyage with the returning Bradman's Invincibles. He was chosen in the Australian team to compete at the 1950 Commonwealth Games in Auckland, where he finished second in 14.4 seconds to Australian Peter Gardner who ran a Games record 14.3 seconds.

Weinberg was again chosen to represent Australia, this time at the 1952 Summer Olympic Games in Helsinki, in his specialty, the 110 metres Hurdles, and also the 4 × 100-metre relay, the 4 × 400-metre relay and the decathlon. He limited his efforts to the hurdles and relay duties, deciding that also competing in the decathlon, where he was the Victorian record holder, was too big a programme.

In the semi-finals of the 110 metres hurdles, he drew Lane 6 which was where the rain water from the grandstand's cantilever roof emptied, making the lane soggy and treacherous. He made the final and unfortunately drew Lane 6 again. He started well with the fancied Americans, but "murdered" the first hurdle and finished 6th. The next Australian male to make an Olympic 110 metres Hurdles Final was Kyle Vander Kuyp at the 1996 Summer Olympics in Atlanta, 44 years later.

As part of the lead-up to the Helsinki Olympics, he competed in the 1952 AAA Championships and won the 120 yards hurdles in British All-comers Record of 14.4 seconds. This stood as the best time for the Championships for 6 years. He was presented with his trophy by Queen Elizabeth.

Competing in his third Olympic Games was not to be. In 1956 his home base of Melbourne was to host the XVI Summer Olympics, however he was suffering from a debilitating eye complaint which required both his eyes to be bandaged.

== Olympic Games results ==
Olympic Games	Event	Phase	Place	Time (Hand)
1948 London	110m. Hurdles	Semi-final	5th	
1952 Helsinki	110m. Hurdles	Final	6th	14.8
	4 × 100 m. Relay	Round One	5th	42.3
	4 × 400 m. Relay	Round One	5th	3.15.8
	Decathlon		Did not compete	

Selection of Australian Olympic Games teams for the 1948 and 1952 Summer Olympics was, initially, based on a ranking per Olympic sport of its potentially most successful athletes. From there the Australian Olympic Federation (AOF) collated the sports' rankings and then made an overall ranking, rather than by sport, of the potentially most successful athletes. For instance, in 1948, Joyce King and Shirley Strickland (both from athletics) were ranked 1st. and 2nd. of all athletes from all the sports that were presented to the AOF. Unlike selection for current Australian Olympic teams, the AOF announced that it could fund a specific number of athletes per its ranking assessment and, those ranked lower than this cut-off, would have to raise the funds to send the next ranked athlete and so on. . Of the 29 swimmers and 10 water polo players nominated by Australian Swimming Union, just four would have their fares paid, unless they could raise the necessary funds themselves. The financially strapped AOF decided that the 1948 Olympic team would return steerage class by steamer rather than by airplane - a fare of £69 compared to £375 by air.

Records
Preceded by (Australia) Ray Weinberg	Men's 110 m Hurdles Australia Record Holder; 19 February 1952 – 6 March 1972	Succeeded by (Australia) Mal Baird
Preceded by (Australia) Peter Gardner	Men's 220 yards Hurdles Australia Record Holder; 1952 – 1953	Succeeded by (Australia) Ken Doubleday

== Coaching career ==
Work commitments limited his coaching to more of a sought-after "technique consultant" to many of Australia's top hurdlers during the 1960s and 1970s. When time allowed he would also giving technique coaching to young athletes and at schools, all for free.

He was appointed Coach of the Australian Athletics Team for the 1968 Summer Olympics at Mexico City, a 25-person team who won 7 medals between them. On the death of the Athletics Team manager, Jim Howlin, Weinberg also took over management of the team, which was in Mexico City for 6 weeks to acclimatise to the high altitude.

Weinberg's team included gold medalists Ralph Doubell and Maureen Caird. He was also involved in the aftermath of Black Power salute during the medal ceremony for the Men's 200 metres where Australian, Peter Norman had run second.

From his performance as Coach, and also taking on the Team Manager's role, at the 1968 Summer Olympics it seemed that Weinberg would definitely be named as Coach for the 1972 Summer Olympics. As Australian Coach of the 1969 Pacific Conference Games team, his qualifications were even strengthened, and it was a major shock when interstate politics between the various state athletic associations stymied his selection.

== Media career ==
His media career began with ATV-0 (later ATV-10, now part of Network Ten), where he was a commentator on the TV station's coverage of the 1964 Summer Olympics in Tokyo. This led to being part of ATV-10's live-to-air sports show and then a position in advertising sales.

He moved from advertising sales to media planning and buying and joined multinational advertising agency Masius and from there successfully had other agency and media roles.

In 1980, he joined The Seven Network's commentary team to cover the 1980 Summer Olympics in Moscow. These games were very controversial, as the U.S. and some other countries had joined in an Olympic boycott in protest at the Soviet invasion of Afghanistan. There was public and political pressure for Australia to join the Olympic boycott and so Seven's coverage was more limited than it may have been otherwise. This meant commentators doubling-up on events and sports that may not have been their areas of expertise, so he commentated on weightlifting as well as athletics.

== Awards and recognition ==
In 2000, he was awarded the Australian Sports Medal.

On 12 June 2005, in the Queen's Birthday Honours List, he was made a Member (AM) of the Order of Australia, for "services to athletics through administrative roles, and as a competitor". The honour was presented by his former teammate and lifelong friend, John Landy, the then Governor of Victoria.

In 2009, he was honoured by Athletics Australia as a Life Member. In 2018, he was awarded Life Membership of the Victorian Olympic Council.

== First Australian Olympic lapel pin ==
When Weinberg was a competitor in the 1948 Summer Olympics it was very apparent that the Australian team was "under-outfitted" in many ways, compared to other countries' teams. Many other teams had special national Olympic team lapel pins, which were all the rage and became almost "currency" during the Games, and with collectors thereafter.

Fortunate enough to be chosen to represent his country at the 1952 Summer Olympics in Helsinki, he used the experience he had gained, and created, designed and had manufactured, the first Australian Olympic lapel pin. His design of kangaroo, above the word "Australia", and the Olympic rings, has been copied by numerous Australian Olympic teams that have followed.

== See also ==
- Shirley Ogle
- List of Olympic medalists in athletics (men)
