= Richard Dixon (sailor) =

British sailor

Olympic medal record

Sailing

Representing United Kingdom

Olympic Games
Gold medal – first place	1908 London	7 Metre

Richard Travers Dixon (20 November 1865 – 14 November 1949) was a British sailor who competed in the 1908 Summer Olympics. He was a crew member of the British boat Heroine, which won the gold medal in the seven metre class.
