= Frances Rivett-Carnac =

British sailor

Olympic medal record

Sailing

Representing Great Britain

Olympic Games
Gold medal – first place	1908 London	7 Metre

Frances Clytie Rivett-Carnac (née Greenstock; 16 May 1874 – 1 January 1962) was a British sailor who competed in the 1908 Summer Olympics. She was a crew member of the British boat Heroine III, the only boat in the 7-metre class. Because a second British entry failed to make it to the start, the boat was required to complete just one lap of two races to win. Her husband Charles Rivett-Carnac was also a crew member and won Olympic gold. Their granddaughter Cleone Rivett-Carnac was an athlete in New Zealand.
