= Daphne Hasenjäger =

South African athlete (born 1929)

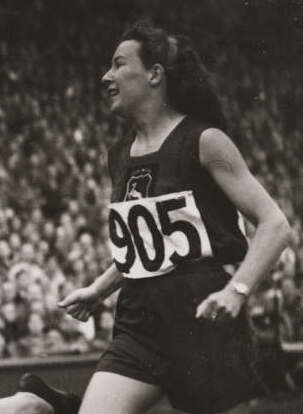
- Semi Finals of the Women's 200 metres at the Olympic Games, London, 1948

Personal information
- Full name: Daphne Lilian Evelyn Hasenjäger
- Born: Daphne Robb; 2 July 1929 (age 96) Pretoria, South Africa
Medal record
Women's athletics
Representing South Africa
Olympic Games
Silver medal – second place	1952 Helsinki	100 metres
British Empire Games
Bronze medal – third place	1950 Auckland	220 yards

Daphne Lilian Evelyn Hasenjäger (née Robb; born 2 July 1929) is a South African former sprinter. She competed for South Africa at the 1952 Summer Olympics, held in Helsinki, Finland, in the 100 metres, where she won the silver medal, splitting Australians Marjorie Jackson and Shirley Strickland.
