= Mataika Tuicakau =

Fijian shot putter and discus thrower

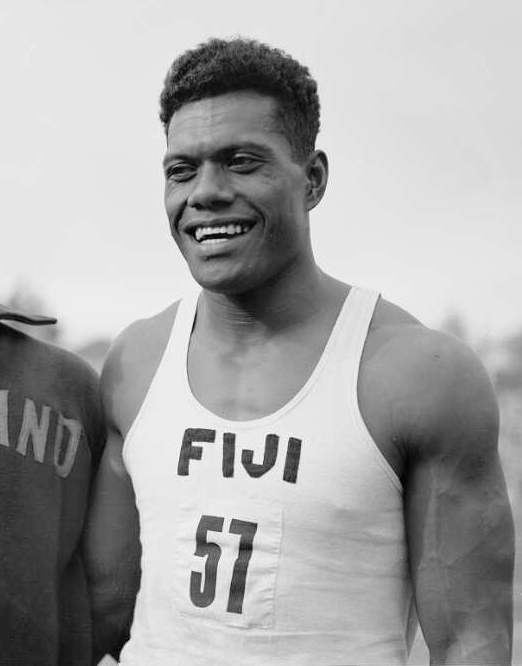
- Tuicakau at the 1950 British Empire Games

Sport
- Sport: Athletics
- Events: Shot put; discus throw

Achievements and titles
- Personal best: SP – 15.48 m (1951)
Medal record
Representing Fiji
1950 British Empire Games
Gold medal – first place	1950 Auckland	Shot put
Silver medal – second place	1950 Auckland	Discus throw

Mataika Tuicakau was a Fijian track and field athlete who competed in the shot put and discus throw events.

Born on Tovu, Totoya on the Lau Islands of Fiji, Tuicakau was a tall athlete who excelled at throwing events. He was the first Fijian to have success internationally in the sport of athletics. At the 1950 British Empire Games he threw 14.64 m (48 ft 1/4 in) in the shot put to hold off England's Harold Moody and be declared the champion. He also claimed a silver medal in the discus behind Ian Reed of Australia, who broke the games record in the process.

He was the first gold medallist for Fiji at the Commonwealth Games and remains their only athletics winner in the tournament's history. The shot put national record of 15.48 m (50 ft 9 1/4 in) he set in Suva in 1951 stood for over 50 years. He was the first entrant into the Fiji Sports Hall of Fame alongside rugby player Josefa Levula.
