= Athletics at the 1950 British Empire Games =

Athletics at the 4th British Empire Games
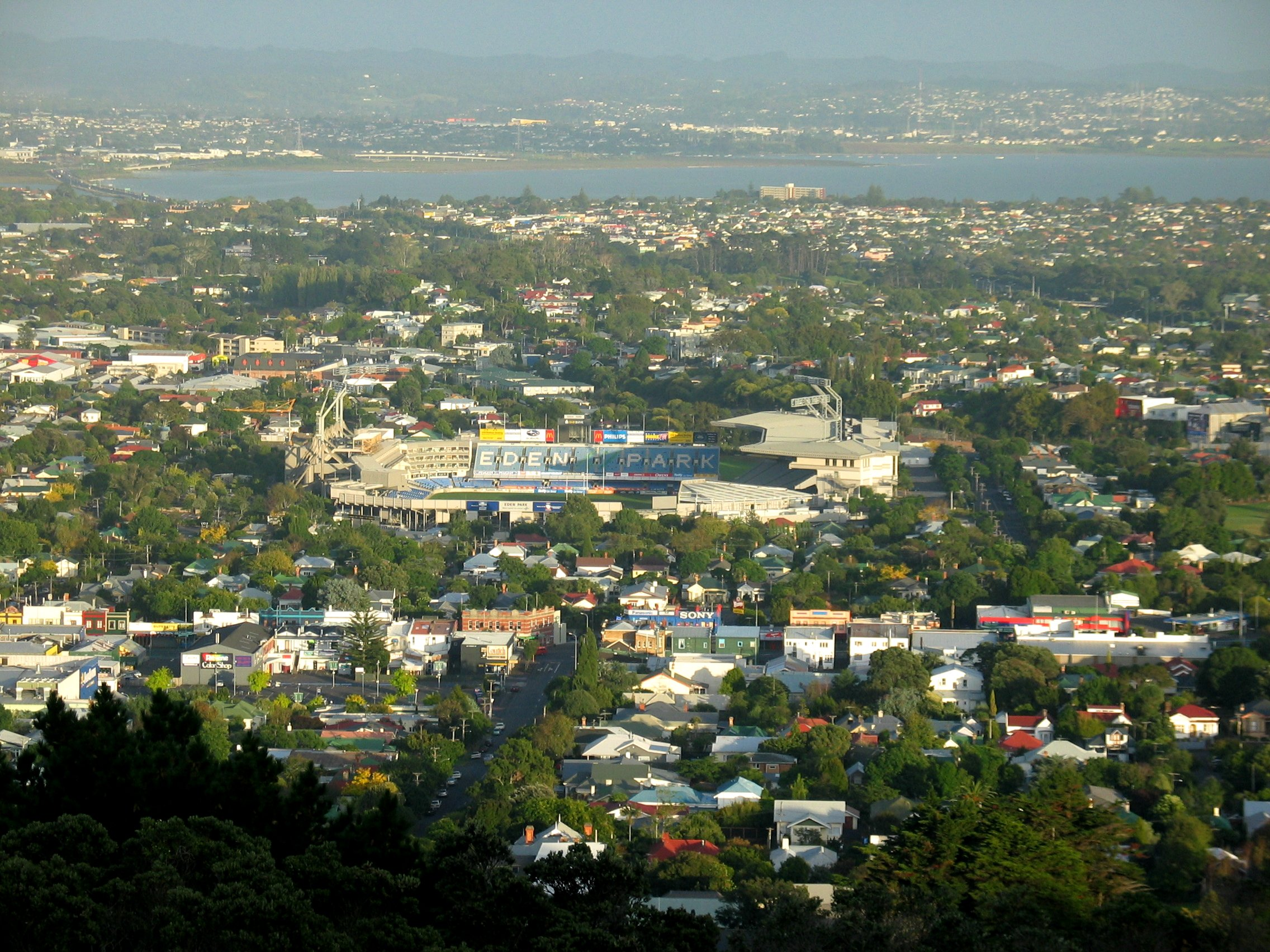
- Eden Park hosted the athletics competition and the games opening ceremony.
- Dates: 5–11 February 1950
- Host city: Auckland, New Zealand
- Venue: Eden Park
- Level: Senior
- Events: 28
- Participation: 195 athletes from 12 nations

At the 1950 British Empire Games, the athletics events were held at Eden Park in Auckland, New Zealand in February 1950. A total of 28 athletics events were contested at the Games, 20 by men and 8 by women. A total of seventeen Games records were set or improved over the competition.

A number of events can be viewed in series of thirteen 1950 Empire Games archive reels which have been uploaded by Archives New Zealand on YouTube.

== Medal summary ==
=== Men ===
Medallists in men's athletics by event with times, heights and distances; link to details of each event
Event	Gold		Silver		Bronze	
100 yards	John Treloar (AUS)	9.7 GR=	William De Gruchy (AUS)	9.8	Don Pettie (CAN)	9.9
220 yards	John Treloar (AUS)	21.5	David Johnson (AUS)	21.8	Don Jowett (NZL)	21.8
440 yards	Edwin Carr (AUS)	47.9 GR=	Leslie Lewis (ENG)	48.0	David Batten (NZL)	48.8
880 yards	John Parlett (ENG)	1:53.1	Jack Hutchins (CAN)	1:53.4	Bill Parnell (CAN)	1:53.4
1 mile	Bill Parnell (CAN)	4:11.0 GR	Len Eyre (ENG)	4:11.8	Maurice Marshall (NZL)	4:13.2
3 miles	Len Eyre (ENG)	14:23.6	Harold Nelson (NZL)	14:27.8	Anthony Chivers (ENG)	14:28.1
6 miles	Harold Nelson (NZL)	30:29.6	Andrew Forbes (SCO)	30:31.9	Noel Taylor (NZL)	30:31.9
Marathon	Jack Holden (ENG)	2:32:57 GR	Syd Luyt (SAF)	2:37:03	Jack Clarke (NZL)	2:39:27
120 yards hurdles	Peter Gardner (AUS)	14.3 GR	Ray Weinberg (AUS)	14.4	Tom Lavery (SAF)	14.6
440 yards hurdles	(Dominion of Ceylon) Duncan White (CEY)	52.5 GR	John Holland (NZL)	52.7	Geoff Goodacre (AUS)	53.1
4 × 110 yards relay	Australia; Scotchy Gordon; David Johnson; John Treloar; William De Gruchy	42.2	England; Brian Shenton; Jack Archer; Leslie Lewis; Nick Stacey	42.5	New Zealand; Arthur Eustace; Clem Parker; Kevin Beardsley; Peter Henderson	42.6
4 × 440 yards relay	Australia; Edwin Carr; George Gedge; James Humphreys; Ross Price	3:17.8	England; Derek Pugh; John Parlett; Leslie Lewis; Terry Higgins	3:19.3	New Zealand; David Batten; Derek Steward; John Holland; Jack Sutherland	3:20.0
High jump	John Winter (AUS)	1.98 m GR	Josiah Majekodunmi (NGR); Alan Paterson (SCO)	1.96 m	None awarded	
Pole vault	Tim Anderson (ENG)	3.97 m	Stan Egerton (CAN)	3.97 m	Peter Denton (AUS)	3.88 m
Long jump	Neville Price (SAF)	7.32 m	Bevin Hough (NZL)	7.20 m	David Dephoff (NZL)	7.09 m
Triple jump	Brian Oliver (AUS)	15.61 m	Les McKeand (AUS)	15.28 m	Ian Polmear (AUS)	14.67 m
Shot put	Mataika Tuicakau (FIJ)	14.64 m	Harold Moody (ENG)	13.92 m	Leo Roininen (CAN)	13.68 m
Discus throw	Ian Reed (AUS)	47.72 m GR	Mataika Tuicakau (FIJ)	44.00 m	Svein Sigfusson (CAN)	43.48 m
Hammer throw	Duncan Clark (SCO)	49.94 m GR	Keith Pardon (AUS)	47.83 m	Herb Barker (AUS)	45.62 m
Javelin throw	Leo Roininen (CAN)	57.11 m	Luke Tunabuna (FIJ)	56.02 m	Doug Robinson (CAN)	55.60 m

=== Women ===
Medallists in women's athletics by event, with times, heights and distances; link to event details
Event	Gold		Silver		Bronze	
100 yards	Marjorie Jackson (AUS)	10.8 GR	Shirley Strickland (AUS)	11.0	Verna Johnston (AUS)	11.1
220 yards	Marjorie Jackson (AUS)	24.3 GR	Shirley Strickland (AUS)	24.5	Daphne Robb (SAF)	24.7
80 metres hurdles	Shirley Strickland (AUS)	11.6	June Schoch (NZL)	11.6	Janet Shackleton (NZL)	11.7
110–220–110 yards relay	Australia; Marjorie Jackson; Shirley Strickland; Verna Johnston	47.9 GR	New Zealand; Lesley Rowe; Dorothea Parker; Shirley Hardman	48.7	England; Dorothy Manley; Margaret Walker; Sylvia Cheeseman	50.0
220–110–220–110 yards relay	Australia; Ann Shanley; Marjorie Jackson; Shirley Strickland; Verna Johnston	1:13.4 GR	England; Doris Batter; Dorothy Manley; Margaret Walker; Sylvia Cheeseman	1:17.5	Canada; Elaine Silburn; Eleanor McKenzie; Gerry Bemister; Patricia Jones	Unknown
High jump	Dorothy Tyler (ENG)	1.60 GR=	Bertha Crowther (ENG)	1.60 m	Noelene Swinton (NZL)	1.55 m
Long jump	Yvette Williams (NZL)	5.90 m GR	Judy Canty (AUS)	5.78 m	Ruth Dowman (NZL)	5.74 m
Javelin throw	Charlotte MacGibbon (AUS)	38.84 GR	Yvette Williams (NZL)	37.96	Cleone Rivett-Carnac (NZL)	34.43

== Medal table ==
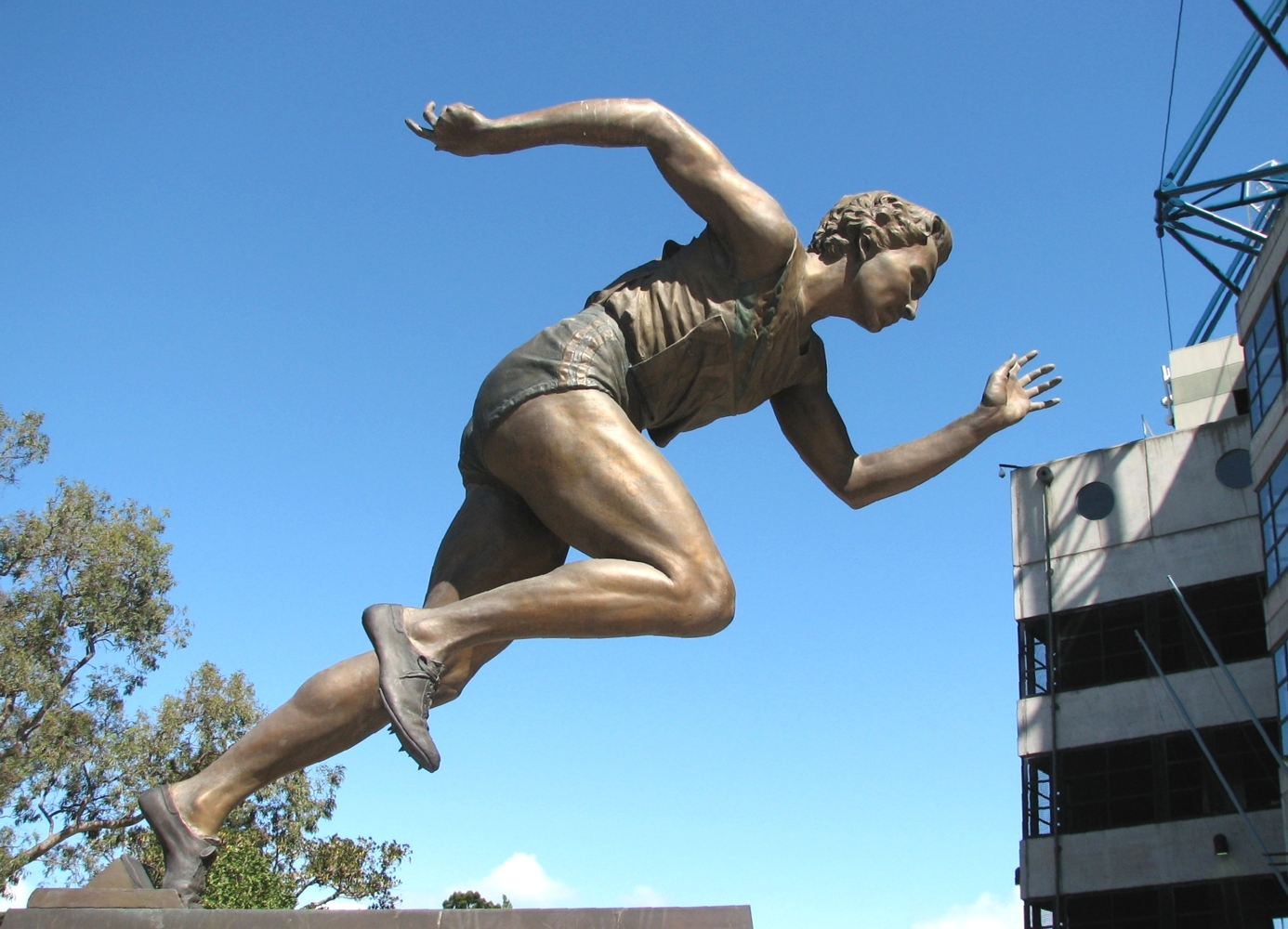
Shirley Strickland (statue above) won a hurdles gold medal, two relay golds and two sprint silvers for Australia.

* Host nation (New Zealand)

Medals won by nation with totals
Rank	Nation	Gold	Silver	Bronze	Total
1	Australia (AUS)	15	8	5	28
2	England (ENG)	5	7	2	14
3	New Zealand (NZL)*	2	6	12	20
4	Canada (CAN)	2	2	6	10
5	Fiji (FIJ)	1	2	0	3
5	Scotland (SCO)	1	2	0	3
7	South Africa (SAF)	1	1	2	4
8	Ceylon (CEY)	1	0	0	1
9	Nigeria (NGR)	0	1	0	1
Totals (9 entries)		28	29	27	84

== Participating nations ==
- Australia (46)
- Canada (25)
- Ceylon (6)
- England (27)
- Fiji (4)
- Malaya (2)
- New Zealand (64)
- Nigeria (4)
- Scotland (7)
- South Africa (7)
- Southern Rhodesia (2)
- Wales (1)
