= Bill Parnell =

Canadian middle-distance runner

Medal record

Men's Athletics

Representing Canada

Commonwealth Games
Gold medal – first place	1950 Auckland	1 Mile
Bronze medal – third place	1950 Auckland	880 Yards

Comer William Parnell (14 February 1928 in Vancouver – 6 September 2008) was a Canadian middle distance runner who competed in the 1948 Summer Olympics and in the 1952 Summer Olympics. He won the gold medal in the 1 mile race at the 1950 British Empire Games at Auckland. He was third in the 1950 British Empire Games 880 yards. In the 4×440 yards Relay (with Don Pettie, Jack Hutchins, and Bill LaRochelle) Parnell finished fifth. In the 1954 British Empire and Commonwealth Games 880 yards he finished seventh and in the 1954 British Empire and Commonwealth Games 1 mile he was eliminated in the heats.

Parnell competed for the Washington State Cougars track and field team in the NCAA.
