= List of units in the New Zealand Cadet Corps =

This is a list of units in the New Zealand Cadet Corps. Each unit is led and managed by the Cadet Unit Commander, their officers and staff.

As of 2025 there are 34 New Zealand Cadet Corps units.

== Map of New Zealand Cadet Corps Units ==
Units of the New Zealand Cadet Corps

== List of New Zealand Cadet Corps Units ==
Abbrv.	Unit	Town / City	Region	Area	Coordinates	Unit Colour Patch	Unit Recognition Patch	Army Sponsor Unit	Commissioned	Website and Notes
OCCU	Opotiki College Cadet Unit	Ōpōtiki	Bay of Plenty	Northern Area	38°00′50″S 177°17′16″E			3/6 Battalion RNZIR	Unknown	2nd oldest unit in the New Zealand Cadet Corps.; Only unit to retain their direct association with their parent college.
PapCU	Papakura Cadet Unit	Papakura	Auckland	Northern Area	37°04′01″S 174°57′56″E			3/6 Battalion RNZIR	Unknown	Archived Formerly: City of Papakura Cadet Unit
RDCU	Rotorua District Cadet Unit	Rotorua	Bay of Plenty	Northern Area	38°07′46″S 176°14′20″E		None to date	3/6 Battalion RNZIR	Unknown	
CACU	City of Auckland Cadet Unit	Auckland	Auckland	Northern Area	36°51′51″S 174°44′51″E	None		3/6 Battalion RNZIR	1987 (38 years ago)	
HCCU	Hamilton City Cadet Unit	Hamilton	Waikato	Northern Area	37°46′52″S 175°16′34″E			3/6 Battalion RNZIR	Unknown	
KCU	Kerikeri Cadet Unit	Kerikeri	Northland	Northern Area	35°13′04″S 173°52′59″E	None	None to date	3/6 Battalion RNZIR	Unknown	
NSCU	North Shore Cadet Unit	North Shore	Auckland	Northern Area	36°46′55″S 174°42′57″E	None	None to date	3/6 Battalion RNZIR	Unknown	Archived Formerly: City of North Shore Cadet Unit
WaitCU	Waitakere Cadet Unit	Waitakere	Auckland	Northern Area	36°50′29″S 174°36′02″E			3/6 Battalion RNZIR	1987 (38 years ago)	Archived Formerly: Waitakere City Cadet Unit; Te Atatu Cadet Unit
TACCU	Te Awamutu Community Cadet Unit	Te Awamutu	Waikato	Northern Area	38°00′33″S 175°19′51″E		None to date	3/6 Battalion RNZIR	November 1994 (31 years ago)	
WBPCU	Western Bay of Plenty Cadet Unit	Tauranga	Bay of Plenty	Northern Area	37°42′00″S 176°09′44″E			3/6 Battalion RNZIR	1998 (27 years ago)	
WhanDCU	Whangarei District Cadet Unit	Whangārei	Northland	Northern Area	35°46′02″S 174°21′57″E		None to date	3/6 Battalion RNZIR	Unknown	
TamCU	Tamaki Cadet Unit	Otahuhu	Auckland	Northern Area	36°56′02″S 174°51′46″E			3/6 Battalion RNZIR	Unknown	
MwiCU	Mangawhai Cadet Unit	Mangawhai	Northland	Northern Area	36°08′33″S 174°30′30″E	None		3/6 Battalion RNZIR	Unknown	
WCCU	Wellington City Cadet Unit	Wellington	Wellington	Central Area	41°18′17″S 174°48′04″E			5/7 Battalion RNZIR	March 9, 2010 (15 years ago) - Re-opening	Archived Formerly: Rongotai College Cadet Unit
CGCU	City of Gisborne Cadet Unit	Gisborne	Gisborne	Central Area	38°39′59″S 178°01′23″E			5/7 Battalion RNZIR	Unknown	
CPorCU	City of Porirua Cadet Unit	Porirua	Wellington	Central Area	41°05′57″S 174°51′57″E			5/7 Battalion RNZIR	December 1984 (41 years ago)	
CUHCU	City of Upper Hutt Cadet Unit	Upper Hutt	Wellington	Central Area	41°08′41″S 175°02′32″E			5/7 Battalion RNZIR	Unknown	
CNPCU	City of New Plymouth Cadet Unit	New Plymouth	Taranaki	Central Area	39°03′20″S 174°04′50″E			5/7 Battalion RNZIR	Unknown	
CLHCU	City of Lower Hutt Cadet Unit	Lower Hutt	Wellington	Central Area	41°13′27″S 174°54′20″E			5/7 Battalion RNZIR	Unknown	Archived
RCU	Ruahine Cadet Unit	Waipukurau	Hawke's Bay	Central Area	39°59′34″S 176°33′29″E			5/7 Battalion RNZIR	November 1991 (34 years ago)	
RRCU	Rangitikei Ruapehu Cadet Unit	Ruapehu	Manawatū-Whanganui	Central Area	39°28′22″S 175°40′25″E			5/7 Battalion RNZIR	1998 (27 years ago)	
CNapCU	City of Napier Cadet Unit	Napier	Hawke's Bay	Central Area	39°29′01″S 176°55′10″E			5/7 Battalion RNZIR	Unknown	
TaupoCU	Taupō Cadet Unit	Taupō	Waikato	Central Area	38°40′40″S 176°05′29″E			3/6 Battalion RNZIR	Unknown	Merged with Taumaranui Cadet Unit in 2020
PNCU	Palmerston North Cadet Unit	Palmerston North	Manawatū-Whanganui	Central Area	40°22′13″S 175°37′53″E				Unknown	Archived
FCU	Feilding Cadet Unit	Feilding	Manawatū-Whanganui	Central Area	40°15′27″S 175°36′08″E			5/7 Battalion RNZIR	Unknown	Archived
WanCU	Whanganui Cadet Unit	Whanganui	Manawatū-Whanganui	Central Area	39°56′12″S 175°02′48″E	None	No digital media	5/7 Battalion RNZIR	Unknown	
ACU	Ashburton Cadet Unit	Ashburton	Canterbury	Southern Area	43°54′19″S 171°45′07″E			2/4 Battalion RNZIR	Unknown	
NCU	Nelson Cadet Unit	Nelson	Nelson	Southern Area	41°16′26″S 173°16′49″E			2/4 Battalion RNZIR	1987 (38 years ago)	
CCCU	City of Christchurch Cadet Unit	Christchurch	Canterbury	Southern Area	43°32′56″S 172°32′49″E			2/4 Battalion RNZIR	February 29, 1988 (37 years ago)	
SCU	Selwyn Cadet Unit	Rolleston	Canterbury	Southern Area	43°36′16″S 172°23′10″E	None		2/4 Battalion RNZIR	2022 (3 years ago)	
CDCU	City of Dunedin Cadet Unit	Dunedin	Otago	Southern Area	45°53′25″S 170°29′56″E			2/4 Battalion RNZIR	Unknown	
ICU	Invercargill Cadet Unit	Invercargill	Southland	Southern Area	46°24′06″S 168°20′33″E			2/4 Battalion RNZIR	Unknown	
MotCU	Motueka Cadet Unit	Motueka	Tasman	Southern Area	41°07′23″S 174°36′02″E			2/4 Battalion RNZIR	Unknown	
TimCU	Timaru Cadet Unit	Timaru	Otago	Southern Area	44°20′58″S 171°13′51″E			2/4 Battalion RNZIR	July 2013 (12 years ago)	

== Former Units ==
Former Units of the New Zealand Cadet Corps
Abbrv.	Unit	Town / City	Area		Commissioned	Date of Disbandment	Notes.
KCCU	Kaipara Community Cadet Unit	Helensville	Northern Area	36°40′35″S 174°27′04″E	1997	2013 (16 Years)	
SCCU	Southern Cross Cadet Unit	Māngere	Northern Area	36°57′55″S 174°49′00″E		2018	
MCU	Maungarei Cadet Unit	Mt Wellington	Northern Area	36°53′54″S 174°51′23″E		2018	Archived
WCU	Waiuku Cadet Unit	Waiuku	Northern Area	37°15′05″S 174°43′25″E		2007	
FHSCU	Hamilton's Fraser High School Cadet Unit	Hamilton	Northern Area	37°47′03″S 175°14′37″E	1931	2016	
EBopCU	Eastern Bay of Plenty Cadet Unit	Whakatāne	Northern Area	37°56′58″S 177°00′07″E		2009	
TWaACU	Te Whanau a Apanui Cadet Unit	Te Kaha	Northern Area	37°44′23″S 177°40′39″E		2010	
WDCU	Wairoa District Cadet Unit	Wairoa	Central Area	39°01′45″S 177°25′04″E		2013	
NCCU	Ngāruawāhia Community Cadet Unit	Ngāruawāhia	Northern Area		01/11/1986		
WACCU	West Auckland Cadet Unit	Auckland	Northern Area		1987		
CoMCU	City of Manukau Cadet Unit	Manukau	Northern Area			1996	
MASCU	Mangakino Area School Cadet Unit	Mangakino	Northern Area				
BHSCU	Bayfield Highschool Cadet Unit	Dunedin	Southern Area			30/09/1996	
WCU	Wairarapa Cadet Unit	Wairarapa	Central Area				
TACU	Te Atatu Cadet Unit	Te Atatū Peninsula	Northern Area				
ChCCU	Christs College Cadet Unit	Christchurch	Southern Area			1996	
KingCCU	King Country Cadet Unit	Taumaranui	Central Area			2014	Rebrand of Taumaranui Cadet unit, before Taumaranui eventually merged with Taupo Cadet unit

== Former School Cadet Units ==
There are 152 former high school Cadet Units.

Unit Name	Town / City	Area	Commissioned Date	Date of Disbandment	Notes.
Aranui High School Cadets	Christchurch	Southern			
Ashburton High School Cadets	Ashburton	Southern			
Auckland Grammar School Cadets	Auckland	Northern			
Avondale College Cadets	Avondale	Northern			
Burnside High School Cadets	Christchurch	Southern			
Cambridge High School Cadets	Cambridge	Northern			
Cashmere High School Cadets	Christchurch	Southern		01/04/1965	
Central Hawke's Bay College Cadets	Waipukurau	Central			
Christ's College Cadets	Christchurch	Southern			
Christchurch Boys High School Cadets	Christchurch	Southern		07/11/1970	
Christchurch West High School Cadets	Christchurch	Southern		01/04/1965	
Christian Brothers High School Cadets	Dunedin	Southern			
Dannevirke High School Cadets	Dannevirke	Central			
Dargaville High School Cadets	Dargaville	Northern			
De la Salle Cadets	Māngere	Northern			
Edmund Campion College Cadets	Gisborne	Central			
Fairfield College Cadets	Hamilton	Northern			
Feilding Agricultural High School Cadets	Feilding	Central			
Francis Douglas College Cadets	New Plymouth	Central			
Freyberg High School Cadets	Palmerston North	Central			
Gore High School Cadets	Gore	Southern			
Greymouth High School Cadets	Greymouth	Southern			
Hakatere College Cadets	Ashburton	Southern			
Hamilton Boys High School Cadets	Hamilton	Northern		28/02/1996	
Hamilton Technical College Cadets	Hamilton	Northern			
Hastings Boys High School Cadets	Hastings	Central			
Henderson High School Cadets	Auckland	Northern			
Heretaunga College Cadets	Upper Hutt	Central			
Hokitika District High School Cadets	Hokitika	Southern			
Horowhenua College Cadets	Levin	Central			
Huntly College Cadets	Huntly	Northern			
Hutt Valley High School Cadets	Lower Hutt	Central			
Hutt Valley Memorial Technical College Cadets	Lower Hutt	Central			
James Hargest Memorial High School Cadets	Invercargill	Southern			
John McGlashan College Cadets	Dunedin	Southern			
Kaeo District High School Cadets	Kaeo	Northern			
Kaikorai Valley High School Cadets	Dunedin	Southern			
Kaipara College Cadets	Kaipara	Northern			
Kaitaia College Cadets	Kaitaia	Northern			
Kings High School Cadets	Dunedin	Southern			
Lindisfarne College Cadets	Hastings	Central			
Linwood High School Cadets	Christchurch	Southern			
Lynfield College Cadets	Auckland	Northern			
Mana College Cadets	Porirua	Central		01/03/1965	
Mangakino District High	Mangakino	Northern			
Marist Brothers High School Cadets, Greymouth	Greymouth	Southern			
Marist Brothers High School Cadets, Invercargill	Invercargill	Southern			
Marist Brothers High School Cadets, Palmerston North	Palmerston North	Central		07/12/1964	
Marlborough College Cadets	Blenheim	Southern			
Matakana Island Maori District High School Cadets	Matakana Island	Northern			
Matamata College Cadets	Matamata	Northern			
Morrinsville College Cadets	Morrinsvile	Northern			
Motatau Maori District High School Cadets	Motatau	Northern		26/01/1965	
Mount Albert Grammar School Cadets	Auckland	Northern		01/09/1964	
Mount Maunganui College Cadets	Mount Maunganui	Northern			
Mount Roskill Grammar School Cadets	Auckland	Northern		07/1996	
Naenae College Cadets	Lower Hutt	Central			
Napier Boys' High School Cadets	Napier	Central		30/11/1964	
Nelson College Cadets	Nelson	Southern			
New Plymouth Boys High School Cadets	New Plymouth	Central			
Ngata Memorial College Cadets	Ruatoria	Northern			
Ngatea District High School Cadets	Ngatea	Northern			
Nightcaps District High School Cadets	Nightcaps	Southern			
Northland College Cadets	Kaikohe	Northern			
Okaihau District High School Cadets	Ōkaihau	Northern			
Okato District High School Cadets	Ōkato	Central			
Opunake High School Cadets	Ōpunake	Central			
Otago Boys High School Cadets	Dunedin	Southern			First Unit
Otahuhu College Cadets	Auckland	Northern			
Otorohanga College Cadets	Ōtorohanga	Northern			
Paeroa College Cadets	Paeroa	Northern			
Palmerston District High School Cadets	Palmerston	Southern			
Papanui High School Cadets	Christchurch	Southern			
Papanui High School Cadets	Christchurch	Southern			
Penrose High School Cadets	Auckland	Northern			
Piopio District High School Cadets	Piopio	Northern			
Pukekohe High School Cadets	Pukekohe	Northern			
Punaruku Maori District High School Cadets	Punaruku	Northern			
Putaruru High School Cadets	Putāruru	Northern			
Rangiora High School Cadets	Rangiora	Southern			
Rangitahi College Cadets	Murupara	Northern		09/03/1966	
Rangitikei College Cadets	Marton	Central			
Rangitoto College Cadets	Auckland	Northern		01/10/1964	
Raupehu College Cadets	Ohakune	Central			
Rawene District High School Cadets	Rawene	Northern			
Reefton District High School Cadets	Reefton	Southern			
Reporoa District High School Cadets	Reporoa	Northern			
Rerekohu District High School Cadets	Te Araroa	Northern			
Riccarton High School Cadets	Christchurch	Southern			
Riverton District High School Cadets	Invercargill	Southern			
Rotorua Boys High School Cadets	Rotorua	Northern			
Ruawai District High School Cadets	Ruawai	Northern		15/09/1964	
Scots College Cadets	Wellington	Central			
Seddon Memorial Technical College Cadets	Auckland	Northern			
Selwyn College Cadets	Auckland	Northern			
Shirley Boys High School Cadets	Christchurch	Southern			
Southland Boys High School Cadets	Invercargill	Southern			
Southland Technical College Cadets	Invercargill	Southern			
St. Andrew's College Cadets	Christchurch	Southern			
St. Augustine's High School Cadets	Whanganui	Central			
St. Bede's College Cadets	Christchurch	Southern			
St. Bernard's College Cadets	Lower Hutt	Central		07/04/1963	
St. John’s College Cadets, Hamilton	Hamilton	Northern			
St. Joseph’s College Cadets	Auckland	Northern			
St. Kevin’s College Cadets	Oamaru	Southern			
St. Patrick's College Cadets, Silverstream	Silverstream	Central			
St. Patrick’s College Cadets, Wellington	Wellington	Central			
St. Peter's College Cadets	Cambridge	Northern		11/02/1966	
St. Peter's Maori College Cadets	Auckland	Northern			
St. Stephen's School Cadets	Bombay	Northern			
Stratford Technical High School Cadets	Stratford	Central			
Taihape District High School Cadets	Taihape	Central			
Taita College Cadets	Taitā	Central			
Takapuna Grammar School Cadets	Auckland	Northern		01/12/1964	
Tamaki College Cadets	Auckland	Northern			
Tararua College Cadets	Pahiatua	Central			
Taumarunui High School Cadets	Taumaranui	Central			
Taupō-Nui-a-Tia College Cadets	Taupō	Central			
Tauranga Boys College Cadets	Tauranga	Northern			
Te Aroha College Cadets	Te Aroha	Northern			
Te Aute College Cadets	Pukehou	Central			
Te Awamutu College Cadets	Te Awamutu	Northern		01/09/1964	
Te Kaha Maori District High School Cadets	Te Kaha	Northern			
Te Kao Maori District High School Cadets	Te Kao	Northern			
Te Kuiti High School Cadets	Te Kūiti	Northern			
Thames High School Cadets	Thames	Northern			
The Taieri High School Cadets	Mosgiel	Southern			
Timaru Boys High School Cadets	Timaru	Southern			
Timaru Technical High School Cadets	Timaru	Southern			
Tokomairiro District High School Cadets	Milton	Southern			
Waiau District High School Cadets	Waiau	Southern			
Waimate High School Cadets	Waimate	Southern			
Waimea College Cadets	Nelson	Southern			
Wairarapa College Cadets	Masterton	Central		23/07/1964	
Waitaki Boys High School Cadets	Oamaru	Southern			
Wellington College Cadets	Wellington	Central			
Wellsford District High School Cadets	Wellsford	Northern			
Westlake High School Cadets	Auckland	Northern			
Westport Technical College Cadets	Westport	Southern			
Whakatane High School Cadets	Whakatāne	Northern			
Wyndham District High School Cadets	Wyndham	Southern			
Xavier College Cadets	Christchurch	Southern			
Yaldhurst Model School Cadets	Yaldhurst	Southern			

== See also ==
New Zealand Cadet Corps

New Zealand Cadet Forces
