= Ruth Dowman =

New Zealand athlete

Personal information
- Born: 3 January 1930
- Died: 14 September 2018 (aged 88)
- Spouse: Clifford Samuel Dickey (m. 1951)

Sport
- Country: New Zealand
- Sport: Track and field

Achievements and titles
- National finals: 75 yd champion (1946, 1947, 1948); 100 yd champion (1946, 1947)
- Personal best: Long jump – 5.74 m
Medal record
Women's athletics
Representing New Zealand
Commonwealth Games
Bronze medal – third place	1950 Auckland	Long jump

Ruth Dickey (née Dowman, 3 January 1930 – 14 September 2018) was a New Zealand long jumper and sprinter who won a bronze medal in the long jump at the 1950 British Empire Games.

== Biography ==
Born on 3 January 1930 to Athol Frederick Dowman and Iris Muriel Dowman (née Kettle), Ruth Dowman showed early promise as a sprinter, beating Joan Hart in a 100 yards handicap race in December 1944. Later that season, in February 1945, Dowman won the 100 yards title at the Auckland provincial track championships, and finished third in the 75 yards. The following month, she competed at the New Zealand national athletics championships in Napier, finishing second in both the 75 yards and 100 yards sprints. Dowman went on to win five national athletics titles: the 75 yards in 1946, 1947, and 1948; and the 100 yards in 1946 and 1947.

At the 1950 British Empire Games in Auckland, Dowman recorded a best distance of 18 ft 10 in (5.74 m), a personal best, in winning the bronze medal in the women's long jump, behind Yvette Williams and Judy Canty. She also competed in the women's 100 yards, being eliminated in the semi-finals. In the 660 yards relay, Dowman was in the New Zealand team alongside Lesley Rowe, Dorothea Parker and Shirley Hardman, but the quartet was disqualified after the baton was dropped and incorrectly retrieved at the final exchange.

In 1951, Dowman married Clifford Samuel Dickey. She died on 14 September 2018.
