= Colleen Malone =

New Zealand sprinter

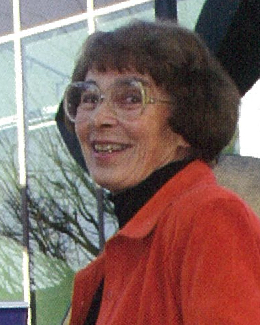
Hill in 2006

Colleen Hill (née Malone; born 1930) is a former New Zealand sprinter and university physical education lecturer.

At the 1950 British Empire Games, Malone competed in the 100 yards event, being eliminated in the semifinal. She later married Clem Hill, the foundation professor of education at Massey University, and she lectured in physical education at the Palmerston North College of Education.
