= Cleone Rivett-Carnac =

New Zealand javelin thrower

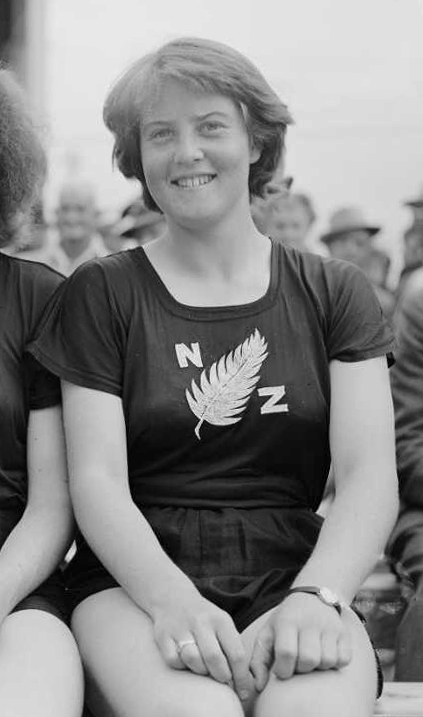
- Rivett-Carnac at the 1950 British Empire Games

Personal information
- Born: Cleone Patricia Rivett-Carnac; 21 April 1933
- Died: 20 January 2003 (aged 69) Napier, New Zealand
- Relative(s): Charles Rivett-Carnac (great-grandfather); James Rivett-Carnac (3xgt-grandfather)

Sport
- Country: New Zealand
- Sport: Track and field
- Event: Javelin throw
- Coached by: Nelson Charles Rivett-Carnac

Achievements and titles
- National finals: Javelin champion (1949, 1951–1954)
Medal record
Representing New Zealand
Commonwealth Games
Bronze medal – third place	1950 Auckland	Javelin

Cleone Patricia Rivett-Carnac (21 April 1933 – 20 January 2003) was a New Zealand javelin thrower.

== Early life and family ==
Born in 1933, Rivett-Carnac was the daughter of Nelson Charles Rivett-Carnac and Bertha Ella Inez Rivett-Carnac (née Litt). Her great-grandfather, Charles Rivett-Carnac, and his second wife, Frances Rivett-Carnac, were the first husband and wife to win Olympic gold medals. Her great-great-great grandfather, Sir James Rivett-Carnac, 1st Baronet, was the Governor of the Bombay Presidency of British India from 1838 to 1841.

== Athletics ==
Trained by her father, Rivett-Carnac won the New Zealand national javelin title five times: in 1949, 1951, 1952, 1953, and 1954. Her winning streak was interrupted by Yvette Williams, who won the championship in 1950. Rivett-Carnac held the New Zealand javelin record from 1948 to 1950.

At the 1950 British Empire Games in Auckland, she won the bronze medal in the javelin throw, with Yvette Williams finishing second in the same event.

Rivett-Carnac also represented Napier in field hockey, netball, and basketball.

== Later life and death ==
Rivett-Carnac worked as a public servant. She began playing golf in 1963, and went on to represent Hawke's Bay/Poverty Bay in that sport.

She died at her home in Napier on 20 January 2003, and her ashes were buried at Napier's Western Hills Cemetery.

== Legacy ==
In 2007, Rivett-Carnac was inducted into the Hawke's Bay sporting legends hall of fame. Napier Girls' High School awards the Cleone Rivett-Carnac Cup for outstanding sporting achievement.
