= Les McKeand =

Australian athlete

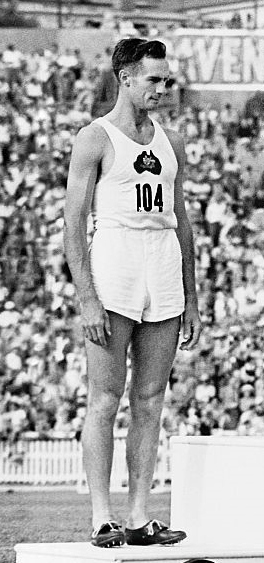
- McKeand at the 1950 British Empire Games

Personal information
- Full name: Leslie Alexander H. McKeand
- Born: 17 September 1924 Kyogle, Australia
- Died: 11 November 1950 (aged 26) Denman, New South Wales, Australia

Sport
- Sport: Athletics
- Event(s): Triple jump, javelin throw
- Club: Royal Australian Air Force, Canberra

Achievements and titles
- Personal best(s): TJ – 15.35 (1950); JT – 50.28 m (1950)
Medal record
Men's athletics
Representing Australia
British Empire Games
Silver medal – second place	1950 Auckland	Triple Jump

Leslie "Les" Alexander H. McKeand (17 September 1924 – 11 November 1950) was an Australian triple jumper and javelin thrower. In the triple jump he won the national title in 1950 and a silver medal at the 1950 British Empire Games, placing seventh at the 1948 Summer Olympics. In the javelin, his best result was seventh place at the 1950 British Empire Games.

McKeand died at the age of 26 in road accident outside Muswellbrook, New South Wales, in 1950. McKeand had attended Sydney University in 1943–1948 and graduated with a Bachelor of Veterinary Science in 1949.

McKeand died in a car crash near Denman, New South Wales on 11 November 1950, aged 26.
