= Herb Barker =

Australia international rugby union player & field athlete (1929-2006)

Herbert Samuel Barker
Personal information
- Born: 23 June 1929 Sydney, New South Wales, Australia
- Died: 17 May 2006 (aged 76)

Rugby union career
- Position: Centre
Senior career
Years	Team	Apps	(Points)
–	Randwick		
Provincial / State sides
Years	Team	Apps	(Points)
–	NSW		
International career
Years	Team	Apps	(Points)
–	Australia	8	
Medal record
Men's Athletics
Representing Australia
Commonwealth Games
Bronze medal – third place	1950 Auckland	hammer throw

Herbert Samuel Barker (23 June 1929 – 17 May 2006) was an all-around athlete who represented Australia in the hammer throw at the Empire Games and in rugby union as a Wallaby, and played for New South Wales in Basketball.

== Early life ==
Barker was born in Sydney and was one of four children. His father died when he 14 and he was introduced to a wide variety of sports by Ray Rosbrook, the supervisor of the Moore Park sports centre. He played rugby league at Crown Street Public School before playing in a Kentwell Cup winning team for Moore Park.

== Sporting career ==
Barker played basketball in the NSW team from 1946 until 1956. In the 1950 British Empire Games he represented Australia as a hammer thrower and won a bronze medal. He won the Australian hammer throw championship in 1956 weighing just over 70 kg. In 1952 he made his first grade debut as a centre with Randwick District Rugby Union Football Club and very soon went into the NSW and Australian sides. He played in internationals against Fiji, New Zealand and South Africa - eight tests in all. He was plagued by injury in 1955 and 1956 and in 1957 he moved to the St George District Rugby League Club. His league career ended in 1959.

== Coaching & teaching career ==
In 1966, Barker became a physical education teacher at Newington College and coached athletics, basketball and rugby union. He retired in 1994

== See also ==
- List of Australian athletics champions
- List of Australia national rugby union players
- List of Commonwealth Games medallists in athletics
