= Charlotte MacGibbon =

Australian track and field athlete

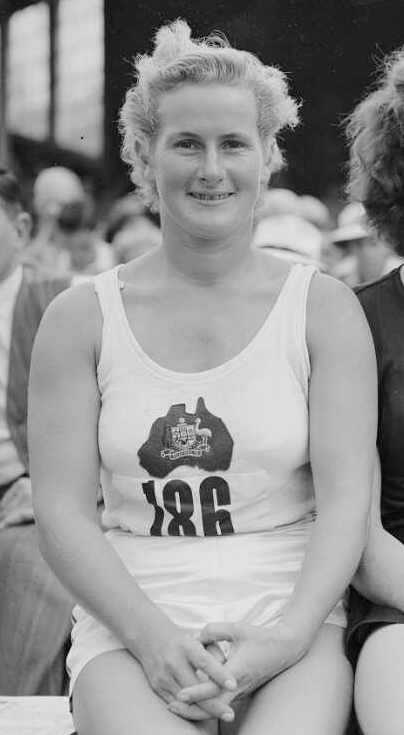
- MacGibbon at the 1950 British Empire Games

Personal information
- Born: 27 September 1924
- Died: 10 January 2009 (aged 84)

Sport
- Sport: Athletics
- Event: Javelin throw

Achievements and titles
- Personal best: 41.18 m (1947)
Medal record
Representing Australia
Commonwealth Games
Gold medal – first place	1950 Auckland	Javelin

Charlotte Cecilia MacGibbon (née: Weeks, 27 September 1924 – 10 January 2009) was an Australian former track and field athlete.

In 1940, MacGibbon won her first national title in the javelin throw, aged just 15. In total, she won six national championships between 1940 and 1952, including two in the discus throw; she also placed third in the shot put in 1947. At the 1950 British Empire Games she became the first Australian athlete to win an international throwing event, taking the javelin with a distance of 38.84 m.

In 2006, at the age of 81, she participated in the 2006 Commonwealth Games Queen's baton relay.
