= Jack Hutchins (runner) =

Canadian middle-distance runner

John "Jack" William Hutchins (born 8 June 1926, Vancouver, British Columbia, died April 8, 2008, West Vancouver, British Columbia) was a Canadian middle-distance runner. Hutchins was the Canadian national record holder in the 880 yards for the years 1946, 1947 and 1951 (shared with Bill Parnell), and the 440 yard Canadian and British Columbia record holder in 1951. He competed for Canada in the 1948 Summer Olympics in London, England having won at the trials in the 880m and coming in 2nd in the 1500m. He competed again at the 1952 Summer Olympics in Helsinki, Finland. Hutchins also competed at the British Empire Games (Commonwealth Games) in 1950 and 1954, winning the silver medal in the 880 yards in 1950.

Hutchins attended the University of Oregon, where he obtained his BSc. He was coached by Bill Bowerman, co-founder of Nike and won several titles as a university track and field athlete, setting records in the mile run. He was an All-American in 1951–52, received the Jack Davies and Oregon Emerald Awards and was the AAU outstanding Canadian track and field athlete in 1952.

Hutchins continued to compete throughout his life and won numerous events in both the United States and Canada and participated in the Vancouver Sun Run in 2007, at the age of 80 with a time of 1.09.27.
