= Bill LaRochelle =

Canadian hurdler and sprinter

Personal information
- Nationality: Canadian
- Born: 12 July 1926
- Died: 29 April 2011 (aged 84)

Sport
- Sport: Sprinting
- Event: 4 × 400 metres relay

William D. "Bill" LaRochelle (12 July 1926 – 29 April 2011) was a Canadian sprinter. He competed in the men's 4 × 400 metres relay at the 1948 Summer Olympics. LaRochelle played football for the Ottawa Rough Riders, Montreal Alouettes, Winnipeg Blue Bombers and Calgary Stampeders from 1949 to 1953.
