= Peter Gardner (hurdler) =

Australian hurdler (1925–1996)

Personal information
- Nationality: Australian
- Born: 5 January 1925 Glen Huntly, Victoria
- Died: 15 February 1996 (aged 71)
- Height: 183 cm (6 ft 0 in)
- Weight: 74 kg (163 lb)

Sport
- Sport: Athletics
- Event: hurdles
- Club: Old Melburnians
Medal record
Men's athletics
Representing Australia
British Empire Games
Gold medal – first place	1950 Auckland	120 yards hurdles

Peter John Gardner (5 January 1925 – 15 February 1996) was an Australian hurdler who competed in the 1948 Summer Olympics.

Gardner finished second behind Joe Birrell in the 120 yards hurdles event at the British 1948 AAA Championships.

Gardner won a gold medal in the 120 yards hurdles event at the 1950 British Empire Games in Auckland.
