= Edwin Carr (athlete) =

Australian sprinter

Medal record

Men's athletics

Representing Australia

Commonwealth Games
Gold medal – first place	1950 Auckland	440 yards
Gold medal – first place	1950 Auckland	4×440 yard relay

Edwin William Carr Jr. (2 September 1928 – 25 March 2018) was an Australian athlete and a surgeon. He won two gold medals at the 1950 British Empire Games in the 440 yards and 4 x 440 yard relay. He represented Australia at the 1952 Summer Olympics in Helsinki and was the son of Slip Carr who ran for Australia at the 1924 Summer Olympics in Paris.

He attended Sydney Church of England Grammar School (SCEGS) at North Sydney from 1938 to 1946. He was U16 school champion athlete in 1944, open champion (1946), then GPS 440 yds champion (1945, 1946), and All Schools champion over 100 yds and 440 yds. In 1947, he commenced medical studies at the University of Sydney and joined the university athletic club (SUAC).

In 1949, he toured New Zealand with an Australian athletic team. He returned there in 1950, running at the Empire Games (the forerunner of the modern Commonwealth Games), and won gold medals in the individual 440 yds (47.9s) and the 4×440 yd relay. Carr went on to represent Australia at the 1952 Helsinki Olympics in the 200m, 400m and relay teams.

After the Helsinki Olympics, he completed studies in medicine and surgery and obtained surgical fellowships in London and Edinburgh. His medical practice was based in the western suburbs of Sydney. He provided surgical and medical services at Ingleburn Army Camp in Sydney. In 1970, he did a tour of duty with the Royal Australian Medical Corps as a surgeon at the Australian field hospital in Vũng Tàu, Vietnam.

In 2000, a portrait of him was hung in the Archibald Prize painted by Ann Morton. That year, he was one of the former Australian Olympians who participated in the Torch Relay before the Sydney 2000 Olympic Games.
