= Ian Reed =

Australian discus thrower (1927–2020)

Personal information
- Born: 13 July 1927 Footscray, Australia
- Died: 7 August 2020 (aged 93) USA
- Height: 187 cm (6 ft 2 in)
- Weight: 89 kg (196 lb)

Sport
- Sport: Athletics
- Event: discus
- Club: Stanford Cardinal
Medal record
Men's Athletics
Representing Australia
British Empire Games
Gold medal – first place	1950 Auckland	Discus Throw

Ian Manley Reed (13 July 1927 – 7 August 2020) was a discus thrower, who represented Australia at the 1952 Summer Olympics. He won the gold medal at the 1950 Commonwealth Games in the men's discus throw event.

== Biography ==
Reed was born in Footscray, Victoria.

Reed finished second behind Mark Pharaoh in the discus throw event at the British 1952 AAA Championships.

He was 25 at the time of the 1952 Summer Olympics in Helsinki, Finland. During the Olympics he started the qualifying rounds ranked as #21 with the distance of his discus throw being 45.12 metres. This caused him to automatically qualify into group B, which moved his rank to #13. His next throw which took place during round one of group B, was 41.51 metres and moved his ranking to #14. However, during round two of group B was considered Reed's best marked distance which measured 45.12 metres and ranked him at #12, therefore qualifying him into the next round. In spite of just having his best marked distance in round 3 of group B, Reed threw the discus a measured 44.24 metres. This caused him not to place in round 3, thus taking him out of the games.

Reed's personal best ever recorded discus throw is 49.52 metres. World Masters Athletics has ranked Ian Reed world number one in his 85–89 age group for the years 2013, 2014, 2015, and 2016.

Reed set a new 90–94 age bracket Masters World Record of 28.49 metres at the San Diego Senior Games in September 2017.
