= Ian Polmear =

Australian metallurgist (1928–2025)

Ian Polmear AO (19 February 1928 – 3 May 2025) was an Australian metallurgist and academic, best known for pioneering research into light alloys and for establishing the Department of Materials Engineering at Monash University. He served as Deputy Vice-Chancellor of Monash University and held numerous leadership roles across Australian science and engineering. Polmear's research on light alloys significantly contributed to the aviation and space industries, including the US Space Shuttle program.

== Early life and education ==
Ian Polmear was born on 19 February 1928 in Sandringham, Victoria. As a child, he was drawn to chemistry and set up a small laboratory on the back veranda of his tolerant parents’ home, using his pocket money to purchase chemicals for his experiments.

Between the years of 1940 to 1945, he attended Caulfield Grammar School, where it is said he excelled in multiple sports; but it was academics, specifically mathematics and chemistry that earned him a Free Place to study metallurgical engineering at the University of Melbourne, graduating with a degree in 1949.

In 1946, Ian joined the local amateur athletics club in Sandringham. Initially competing as a hurdler. He regularly participated in weekly interclub meetings held at Olympic Park in Richmond. Over time, he specialised in the long jump and triple jump, competing at both state and national championship levels. In 1950, he was selected to represent Australia at the British Empire and Commonwealth Games in Auckland, New Zealand, he won a Bronze medal.

During his studies, he undertook field trips to mining operations, unknowingly retracing the footsteps of his Cornish tin-miner great-grandfather.

== Career ==
After graduating, Polmear worked at Australian Paper Manufacturers and then at General Motors in Melbourne, ensuring quality control for components used in the first Holden car engines. He later joined the Aeronautical Research Laboratories (ARL) in Melbourne as an experimental officer after a two-year research exchange in the UK with the Fulmer Research Institute, where he studied aluminium metallurgy and age hardening.

Returning to Melbourne in 1953, Polmear earned an MSc in 1956 from the University of Melbourne and a Doctor of Engineering in 1965 for his published work on aluminium alloys. At ARL, he led the Aircraft Materials Group and made significant contributions to understanding stress corrosion cracking in the aluminum alloys. His research into trace element additions, especially silver, proved instrumental in strengthening alloys used in aerospace applications.

== Academic career at Monash ==
In 1967, Polmear was appointed professor of materials science at Monash University, then a young institution. In 1970, he established the Department of Materials Engineering, transitioning from traditional metallurgy to a broader materials science focus, including polymers and ceramics. The department gained international recognition and produced highly sought-after graduates.

He served as head of department until 1986, after which he became deputy vice-chancellor (research), a role he held until 1990. During this time, he chaired or sat on 26 committees, led Monash’s Equal Opportunity Advisory Committee, and was deeply involved in university sports and governance. He was appointed to a personal chair in materials science in 1991 and became emeritus professor in 1992.

== Research and publications ==
Polmear’s research career spanned over six decades, with collaborations across Europe, Asia, and North America. He was a visiting fellow at Cambridge University and the University of Manchester, where he began writing his influential book Light Alloys (1981), which has since gone through five editions and has been translated into multiple languages.

Even after his formal retirement, he served as visiting professor at Tohoku University (1993–1995) and worked part-time with CSIRO Materials Science and Technology, where he helped launch a light metals research program. He also consulted for the Comalco Research Centre.

Among his works, we can point to Light Alloys: From Traditional Alloys to Nanocrystals (1981; 5th ed. 2017, with co-authors).

== Personal life and death ==
Polmear married his first wife, Valerie, before leaving for England in 1953. They returned to Melbourne and raised three children in Mont Albert North. In 1988, he married Margaret, a botanist and microbiologist. The couple shared a love of gardening and lived in the same home until his death in 2025.

Polmear died on 3 May 2025, at the age of 97.

== Legacy and honours ==
- Officer of the Order of Australia (AO), 1993 – for service to materials science and engineering
- Fellow, Australian Academy of Technological Sciences and Engineering (1978)
- Fellow, Institute of Materials (UK) – second Australian to be so honoured (2002)
- Silver Medal, Institute of Metals and Materials Australasia (1988)
- Centenary of Federation Medal (2003)
- Monash University 50th Anniversary Research Award (2008)

He was also an honorary member of Materials Australia, which named the Ian Polmear Early Career Research Award in his honour. Monash University commemorated him with the Ian Polmear Room in the Faculty of Engineering.

Polmear remained active in academic life well into retirement, continuing to publish and mentor. His contributions to aluminium metallurgy have had enduring impacts on both science and industry, and he is remembered as teacher and university leader.
