= Ann Shanley =

Personal information
- Born: 7 December 1928 Adelaide, South Australia, Australia
- Died: 20 March 2023 (aged 94) Adelaide, South Australia, Australia

Sport
- Country: Australia
- Sport: track and field

Achievements and titles
- Commonwealth finals: 1950 British Empire Games
Medal record
Women's 220–110–220–110 yards relay
Representing Australia
British Empire Games
Gold medal – first place	1950 Auckland

Ann Cooper (née Shanley; 7 December 1928 – 20 March 2023) was an Australian track and field athlete.

She is best known for being part of the gold medal-winning Women's 660 yards medley relay team at the 1950 British Empire Games.

== Athletics career ==
At the age of 12, Shanley joined the Adelaide Harriers athletics club. At the age of 13 in 1942, Shanley won the state open 220 yards championships.

However, the following year she suffered a sprained ankle during the 100 yards event which prevented her from competing for a short time but ultimately continued and found success in the 100 yards event at the state championships throughout the 1940's. Overall, Shanley won a total of 26 state championships in five track and field events - 100 yards, 200 yards, 440 yards as well as long jump and shot put.

At the age of 21, Shanley was selected as part of the Australian track and field team for the 1950 British Empire Games in New Zealand, the first to be held since World War II which prompted the cancellation of both the 1942 and 1946 events. Due to her selection for the British Empire Games, Shanley is considered to be South Australia's first international athlete.

Although Shanley placed 6th in the 100 yards event and fourth in the 220 yards, she was teamed up with Marjorie Jackson, Shirley Strickland and Verna Johnson for the 660 yards medley relay. The relay team won, beating the English, Canadian and New Zealand teams.

Upon returning from the Games, she continued to pursue her athletics career and in March 1950, she created a new state and Australian shot put record during the state championships.

However, following her marriage and the birth of her son, Shanley decided to take a break from athletics. Shanley later returned to athletics in the 1970's, joining the South Australian Masters Athletics at the age of 50.

At the age of 80, Shanley raced for the final time at an event in Italy.

== Recognition ==
In 1997, Shanley was inducted into the Athletics South Australia Hall of Fame, and in 2023 was also inducted into the South Australian Masters Athletics Hall of Fame.

== Personal life and death ==
Shanley married Colin Cooper at St Patrick's Church in Adelaide on 25 February 1950.

Shanley died at the age of 94 on 20 March 2023.
