= Lesley Rowe =

New Zealand sprinter (1929–2011)

Lesley Gibson
Personal information
- Born: Lesley Martha Rowe; 21 March 1929 Auckland, New Zealand
- Died: 5 July 2011 (aged 82)
- Spouse: Robert Alan Gibson

Sport
- Country: New Zealand
- Sport: Track and field

Achievements and titles
- National finals: 220 yards champion (1948, 1951, 1952, 1953)
Medal record
Women's athletics
Representing New Zealand
British Empire Games
Silver medal – second place	1950 Auckland	440 yards relay

Lesley Martha Gibson (née Rowe, 21 March 1929 – 5 July 2011) was a New Zealand sprinter who, as Lesley Rowe, won a silver medal representing her country at the 1950 British Empire Games.

== Early life and family ==
Rowe was born in the Auckland suburb of Grey Lynn on 21 March 1929, the daughter of Lawrence John Rowe and Clarice Rowe (née Downs). She was educated at Epsom Girls' Grammar School from 1943 to 1946, and was a prefect in her final year.

== Athletics ==
Rowe won the New Zealand national 220 yards sprint title four times: in 1948, 1951, 1952, and 1953. In 1949, she finished second, and was the leading New Zealander, behind Shirley Strickland from Australia.

At the 1950 British Empire Games in Auckland, Rowe won the silver medal in the women's 440 yards relay alongside Shirley Hardman and Dorothea Parker, with a time of 48.7 seconds, which broke the previous Empire Games record. She also competed in the 220 yards, finishing sixth in the final. In the 660 yards relay, Rowe was in the New Zealand team alongside Ruth Dowman, Dorothea Parker and Shirley Hardman, but the quartet was disqualified after crossing the finish line in second place, as the baton was dropped and incorrectly retrieved at the final exchange.

== Later life and death ==
Rowe married Robert Alan Gibson, and the couple went on to have two children. She died on 5 July 2011, having been predeceased by her husband.
