= Margaret Walker (athlete) =

British athlete

Personal information
- Nationality: British (English)
- Born: 2 January 1925 Spilsby, England
- Died: 10 May 2016 (aged 91) Saxmundham, England
- Height: 165 cm (5 ft 5 in)
- Weight: 56 kg (123 lb)

Sport
- Sport: Sprinting
- Event: 200 metres
- Club: Spartan Ladies
Medal record
Athletics
Representing England
British Empire Games
Silver medal – second place	1950 Auckland	660 yard relay
Bronze medal – third place	1950 Auckland	4 x 440 yard relay

Margaret Walker (2 January 1925 – 10 May 2016) was a British sprinter who competed at the 1948 Summer Olympics.

== Biography ==
Walker became the national 400 metres champion after winning the British WAAA Championships title at the 1946 WAAA Championships.

Walker finished second behind Sylvia Cheeseman in the 200 metres event at the 1948 WAAA Championships. Shortly afterwards, Walker represented Great Britain at the 1948 Olympic Games in London in the women's 200 metres competition and was also part of Great Britain's 1948 Olympic 4 × 100 m relay team and they were placed fourth.

She also represented England and won a silver medal in the 660 yard relay and a bronze medal in the 4 x 440 yard relay at the 1950 British Empire Games in Auckland, New Zealand. She also competed in the 110 yards and 200 yards events.
