= Svein Sigfusson =

Canadian discus and hammer thrower

Svein Olafur Sigfusson (July 15, 1912 – September 20, 1992) was a Canadian athlete and entrepreneur. He won a bronze medal in the discus throw at the 1950 British Empire Games and was Canadian champion for the hammer throw.

The son of Icelandic-born Manitoba politician Skuli Sigfusson and his wife Gudrun Arnason, he was born in Lundar, Manitoba. Sigfusson operated a transportation company in northern Manitoba on a system of roads, most of which he had developed himself. His company built part of the Trans-Canada Highway, as well as roads in northern Manitoba and northwestern Ontario. In 1971, his operation was shut down by the provincial government when they cancelled land-use permits which allowed the company to build winter roads to remote communities.

Nicknamed "Bigfoot", Sigfusson was 6' 4" in height and wore size 13 track shoes. In 1938, he set a Canadian record in the hammer throw, winning the gold medal at the Canadian championships that same year. He also won silver medals in the discus, shot put, triple jump and javelin events. Sigfusson won at least nine Canadian championships between 1938 and 1954 and was named to the All-Canada track and field team in 1954.

He was received the Manitoba Centennial Medal in 1970, was named to the Order of Canada in 1974 and became a member of the Manitoba Sports Hall of Fame in 1982.

In 1992, he published Sigfusson’s Roads (ISBN 0920486584). Sigfusson died later that year.
