= Eleanor McKenzie =

Canadian sprinter

Eleanor Louise McKenzie (born June 29, 1931) was a Canadian track and field sprinter in the late 1940s and 1950s. She was born in Vancouver, British Columbia.

== Career ==
McKenzie competed in the 60, 100, 220 yards and the 100 and 200 meters and in the 400 m (440 yd) relays. She was recognized as Canada's Outstanding Woman Athlete of the Year winning the Velma Springstead Trophy in 1949. She participated in the 1952 Summer Olympic Games held in Helsinki and in the 1950 British Empire Games held in New Zealand.

McKenzie was the fastest Canadian woman from 1949 to 1953, winning the 100 and 200 race at all the Canadian championships. She ran the anchor position in the relays and with her speed she came from behind, breaking the Canadian relay record at the Canadian Track and Field championships in 1952. She placed 3rd at the 1950 British Empire Games in the 440 yards relay. At the 1952 Helsinki Olympics the Canadian relay team placed 7th. McKenzie's personal bests were achieved at the 1952 Olympics - 12.1 in the 100m sprint (7th fastest time in world) and 25.1 in the 200m sprint (11th fastest in the world). McKenzie's name was placed in the Vancouver City Book of Merit in 1950.

== Personal life ==
McKenzie married Ron Miller from Toronto who held the Canadian Pole Vault record for three years (1953 to 1955). They both competed at the BEG games in Auckland, NZ. They married November 21, 1952, after they both competed at the 15th Olympic Games in Helsinki, Finland. Ronald Miller also competed at the 1954 British Empire and Commonwealth Games in Vancouver, winning the silver medal in the pole vault. They had three daughters Beverly, Lynda and Donna, and 5 grandchildren.
