= Dorothea Parker =

New Zealand sprinter (1928–1993)

Dorrie Parker
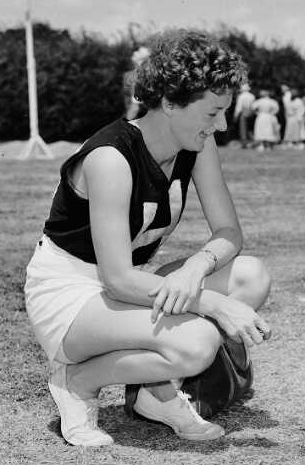
- Parker at the 1950 British Empire Games

Personal information
- Born: Mary Dorothea Parker; 10 August 1928
- Died: 24 December 1993 (aged 65)
- Spouse: Reg Smith
- Relative: Clem Parker (brother)

Sport
- Country: New Zealand
- Sport: Athletics
- Event: Sprint

Achievements and titles
- Personal best(s): 100 m – 12.0 (1950); 200 m – 24.6 (1950)
Medal record
Representing New Zealand
Commonwealth Games
Silver medal – second place	1950 Auckland	440 yards relay

Mary Dorothea Smith (née Parker. 10 August 1928 – 24 December 1993) was a New Zealand sprinter. At the 1950 British Empire Games she won a silver medal in the 440 yards relay, alongside Shirley Hardman and Lesley Rowe. She also ran in the 100 yards, 220 yard, and 660 yard relay, placing fourth in each event. She was overlooked for the 1954 British Empire Games at Vancouver, where results indicate that she could have been a finalist.

She was married to former Waikato rugby and basketball representative Reg Smith; they had seven children. Parker died of cancer, aged 65, on 24 December 1993. Her brother Clem Parker also won a bronze medal in a sprint relay at the 1950 British Empire Games.
