= Verna Johnston =

Australian sprinter (1930–2010)

Personal information
- Nationality: Australian
- Born: 18 March 1930
- Died: 4 April 2010 (aged 80)

Sport
- Sport: Sprinting; Long jump
- Event(s): 4 × 100 metres relay Long jump

Verna Johnston (18 March 1930 – 4 April 2010) was an Australian sprinter and long jumper. She competed in the women's 4 × 100 metres relay and the long jump at the 1952 Summer Olympics.
