= Shirley Strickland =

Australian athlete (1925–2004)

Shirley Strickland AO MBE
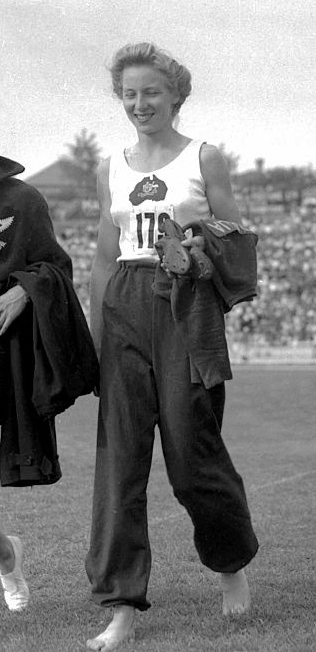
- Strickland at the 1950 Empire Games in Auckland

Personal information
- Full name: Shirley Barbara Strickland de la Hunty
- Nationality: Australian
- Born: 18 July 1925 Guildford, Western Australia
- Died: 11 February 2004 (aged 78) Perth, Western Australia
- Education: University of Western Australia
- Height: 5 ft 7 1/2 in (171 cm)
- Weight: 126 lb (57 kg)

Sport
- Sport: Athletics
- Events: 100–400 m, 80 m hurdles
- Club: University, Applecross, Melville

Achievements and titles
- Personal bests: 100 m – 11.3 (1955); 200 m – 24.1 (1955); 400 m – 56.6 (1956); 80 mH – 10.89 (1956)
Medal record
Women's athletics
Representing Australia
Olympic Games
Gold medal – first place	1952 Helsinki	80-metre hurdles
Gold medal – first place	1956 Melbourne	80-metre hurdles
Gold medal – first place	1956 Melbourne	4 × 100 m relay
Silver medal – second place	1948 London	4 × 100 m relay
Bronze medal – third place	1948 London	100 metres
Bronze medal – third place	1948 London	80-metre hurdles
Bronze medal – third place	1952 Helsinki	100 metres
British Empire Games
Gold medal – first place	1950 Auckland	80-metre hurdles
Gold medal – first place	1950 Auckland	3 × 110/220 yd
Gold medal – first place	1950 Auckland	4 × 110/220 yd
Silver medal – second place	1950 Auckland	100 yards
Silver medal – second place	1950 Auckland	220 yards

Shirley Barbara de la Hunty AO, MBE (née Strickland; 18 July 1925 – 11 February 2004), known as Shirley Strickland during her early career, was an Australian athlete. She won more Olympic medals than any other Australian in running sports.

== Family ==
Strickland was the only daughter, the second of five children. She grew up on the family farm east of the wheatbelt town of Pithara, Western Australia.

Her father, Dave Strickland, while working at Menzies in the goldfields of Western Australia, was also an athlete. He was unable to compete in the 1900 Summer Olympics because he lacked the money for a trip to Paris. Instead, in 1900, he directed his efforts to the Stawell Gift 130-yard (120-m) foot-race, winning in 12 seconds off a handicap of 10 yards. His performance was considered to be as good as those of Stan Rowley, who won the Australian amateur sprint titles that season. (Rowley went on to win three bronze medals in the sprints at the 1900 Paris Olympics). Dave Strickland subsequently went on to play one senior game of Australian rules football with Melbourne-based VFL team St Kilda in 1900 and six with WAFL club West Perth spread across the 1901 and 1909 seasons.

Her mother, Violet Edith Merry, was American-born with a British mining engineer father and a Norwegian mother.

== Education ==
Strickland's early education was by correspondence. From 1934 to 1937 she attended the newly established local East Pithara School, winning a scholarship to attend Northam High School, where, in 1939, she won 47 out of 49 events as a schoolgirl athlete. After high school, she entered the University of Western Australia from where in 1946 she graduated with a Bachelor of Science (Honours) in Physics. In her spare time she lectured in mathematics and physics to returned servicemen at Perth Technical College, played wing in the university hockey team and gained a reputation as an extremely gifted sprinter and hurdler.

== Athletic career ==
The Second World War was disruptive to women's athletics in Australia. Some runners, including Strickland, enlisted to help the war effort.

While teaching at Perth Technical College, she was coached by Austin Robertson, a former world professional sprint champion and South Melbourne footballer. She improved her 100 yards time from 11.8 to 11.0 flat. At the 1947 Western Australia state titles, she won the 100 yards, 220 yards, 440 yards, the 90 m yards hurdles and the shot put.

The following year, she took up running seriously, with great success. She won the national title in the 80 m hurdles in 1948 and was part of the Australian delegation to the 1948 Summer Olympics in London. There, Strickland finished third in both the 100 m and 80 m hurdles and won a silver medal in the 4 × 100 m relay. Despite being awarded 4th place in the 200 m final, a photo finish of the race discovered in 1975 suggested that she may have beaten American Audrey Patterson into third place. For her part, Strickland opposed any suggestion of Patterson returning her medal, and so considered the matter closed.

After winning three gold medals in the 1950 British Empire Games, she won her first Olympic title at the 1952 Games in Helsinki. She won the 80 m hurdles in world record time (10.9 s). A baton mix-up cost her a second gold medal in the 4 × 100 m relay. In the 100 m, she again won a bronze medal.

She set a new world record of 11.3 s for the 100 m in Poland in 1955. Further, in the 1956 Olympics, she won again in the 80 m hurdles and with the Australian 4 × 100 m relay team.

== Post-athletics ==
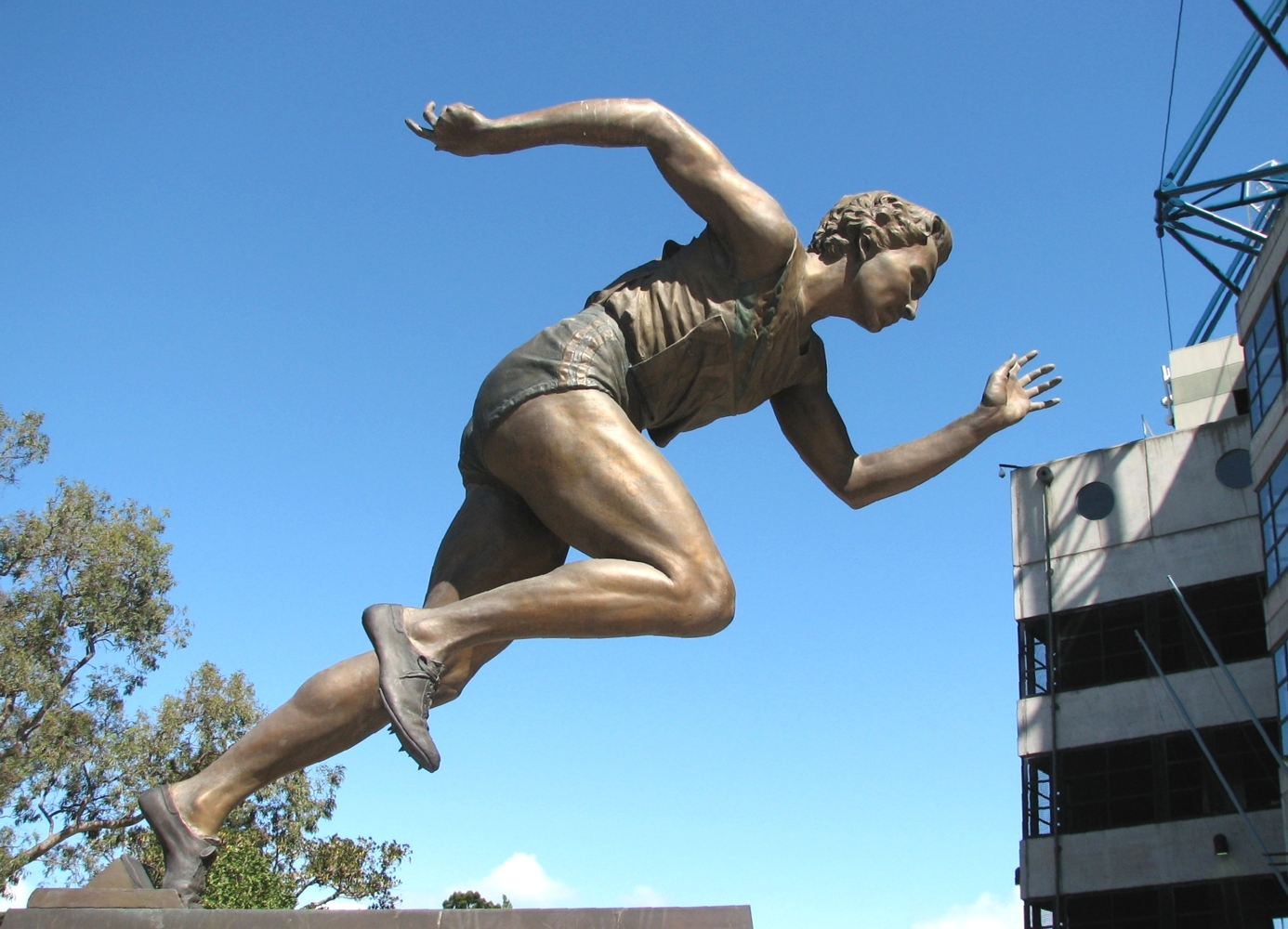
Statue of Shirley Strickland outside the Melbourne Cricket Ground

De la Hunty maintained her Olympic involvement in athlete administration, with the Australian teams during the 1968 and 1976 Olympics in Mexico City and Montreal. She also coached sprinter Raelene Boyle for the 1976 Olympic season.

Along with her husband, de la Hunty had a longstanding involvement with the Australian Democrats. She was a founding member, and later served as president of the party's branch in Western Australia. From the early 1970s through to the mid-1990s, de la Hunty was a perennial candidate for state and federal political office, although never elected. She stood in six state elections – in 1971, and then in five consecutive from 1983 to 1996. In 1983, 1986, and 1996, she stood for the Australian Democrats, while she stood as an independent candidate in the remaining years. She ran for the Legislative Assembly in 1983 and 1993 (in East Melville and Melville, respectively), and for the Legislative Council in 1971, 1986, 1989, and 1996.

At the federal level, all but one of de la Hunty's runs for office were made as a Democrats candidate. In total, she contested seven federal elections—four consecutive from 1977 to 1984, as well as the 1981 by-election in Curtin, and then in 1993 and 1996. She ran for the House of Representatives in 1981 (Curtin), 1984 (Fremantle), and 1993 (Canning), with the latter being her only independent candidacy at federal level. At all other elections, she contested the Senate, where she was generally placed second or third on the Democrats' group voting ticket. Although never elected to parliament, de la Hunty served two periods as a City of Melville councillor, from 1988 to 1996 and from 1999 to 2003. This political affiliation contrasted with the background of her first coach, Betty Judge, who was the wife of Kim Beazley Sr. and mother of Kim Beazley, both prominent Labor politicians.

De la Hunty was one of several female Australian Olympians who carried the Olympic Flame at the Opening Ceremony of the 2000 Sydney Games. In 2001, she attracted media attention by auctioning her sporting memorabilia including her Olympic gold medals. She was criticised by some for that but asserted she had a right to do so and the income generated would help pay for her grandchildren's education and allow a sizeable donation to assist in securing old-growth forests from use by developers. Her memorabilia were eventually acquired for the National Sports Museum in Melbourne by a group of anonymous businessmen who shared her wish that the memorabilia would stay in Australia.

== Personal life ==
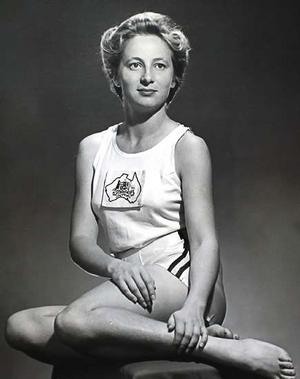
Shirley Strickland aged 23

In 1950, she married geologist Lawrence Edmund de la Hunty, who had been one of her students at Perth Technical College. They had four children: Phillip (1953), Barbara (1957), Matthew (1960) and David (1963). Matthew was the lead singer in Australian rock band Tall Tales and True. Barbara graduated in Science. Phillip's intended medical career was destroyed by heroin addiction though he later graduated with honours in Science. David is an ophthalmologist practising in Rockingham. Lawrence died of a heart attack in 1980, aged 56.

De la Hunty was appointed Officer of the Order of Australia (AO) on 26 January 2001 for service to the community, particularly in the areas of conservation, the environment and local government, and to athletics as an athlete, coach and administrator. She had been appointed Member of the Order of the British Empire (Civil) (MBE) for services to athletics on 1 January 1957.

Her body was found on 16 February 2004 on her kitchen floor, but the coroner determined that she died on the evening of 11 February. There was no full autopsy and the coroner said the cause of death was "unascertainable", though not inconsistent with natural causes.

The Western Australian government honoured her with a state funeral, the first ever for a private citizen.

In 2005, some members of her family approached the coroner regarding the circumstances of her death. In 2006 an investigation was conducted by detectives from the major crime squad. In 2008 probate was granted after a dispute over her will was resolved in the state Supreme Court.

Shirley Strickland Reserve in Ardross, a suburb of Perth, is named in her honour.

In 2001, she was inducted onto the Victorian Honour Roll of Women. In 2011, Shirley was posthumously inducted into the WA Women's Hall of Fame, and in 2014, Strickland de la Hunty was inducted into the International Association of Athletics Federations' Hall of Fame
