= Athletics at the 1951 Mediterranean Games =

Athletics in the Mediterranean Games

- Dates: 6 – 10 October
- Host city: (Egypt) Alexandria
- Events: 23
- Participation: 9 nations

Athletics at the 1951 Mediterranean Games were held in Alexandria, Egypt, and took place from the 6 October to the 10 October.

== Medal table ==
* Host nation (Egypt)

Rank	Nation	Gold	Silver	Bronze	Total
1	France	9	4	0	13
2	Italy	6	4	2	12
3	Greece	3	7	3	13
4	Yugoslavia	3	5	7	15
5	Turkey	2	3	7	12
6	Egypt*	0	0	4	4
Totals (6 entries)		23	23	23	69

== Medal summary ==
=== Track ===
Event	Gold		Silver		Bronze	
100 metres	Stefanos Petrakis; Greece	10.9	Mauro Frizzoni; Italy	11.2	Wolfango Montanari; Italy	11.2
200 metres	Antonio Siddi; Italy	22.0	Jacques Degats; France	22.1	Wolfango Montanari; Italy	22.1
400 metres	Jacques Degats; France	47.8	Antonio Siddi; Italy	47.9	Zvonko Sabolović; Yugoslavia	48.6
800 metres	Patrick El Mabrouk; France	1:50.9	Michel Clare; France	1:54.2	Ekrem Koçak; Turkey	1:54.7
1500 metres	Patrick El Mabrouk; France	3:55.8	Cahit Önel; Turkey	3:56.9	Zdravko Ceraj; Yugoslavia	4:01.5
5000 metres	Alain Mimoun; France	14:38.3	Zdravko Ceraj; Yugoslavia	15:05.2	Stevan Pavlović; Yugoslavia	15:05.5
10,000 metres	Alain Mimoun; France	31:07.9	Franjo Mihalić; Yugoslavia	31:42.8	Mustafa Özcan; Turkey	34:27.5
Marathon	Ahmet Aytar; Turkey	3:07:25	Athanasios Ragazos; Greece	3:21:31	Mohamed Omran; Egypt	3:24:24
110 metres hurdles	Jean-François Brisson; France	15.5	Ioannis Kambadellis; Greece	15.8	Mustafa Batman; Turkey	15.8
400 metres hurdles	Armando Filiput; Italy	53.8	Doğan Acarbay; Turkey	55.1	Igor Zupančič; Yugoslavia	55.4
3000 m steeplechase	Božidar Đurašković; Yugoslavia	9:38.5	Petar Šegedin; Yugoslavia	9:39.2	Mustafa Özcan; Turkey	9:44.9
10 km walk	Pino Dordoni; Italy	51:39.6	Athanasios Aposporis; Greece	54:28.0	Wahib Saleh; Egypt	1:04:20.9
4 x 100 metres relay	Italy; Wolfango Montanari; Franco Leccese; Antonio Siddi; Mauro Frizzoni	42.4	Greece; Vassilis Syllis; Takis Ventikos; Michail Tsolakis; Stefanos Petrakis	43.5	Yugoslavia; Marko Račič; Zvonko Sabolović; Boris Brandl; Petar Pecelj	43.9
4 x 400 metres relay	France; Jacques Degats; Jean-Paul Martin du Gard; Michel Clare; Patrick El Mabrouk	3:19.5	Yugoslavia; Igor Zupančič; Andrija Otenhajmer; Marko Račič; Zvonko Sabolović	3:23.4	Turkey; Cahit Önel; Doğan Acarbay; Ekrem Koçak; Emin Doybak	3:25.9

=== Field ===
Event	Gold		Silver		Bronze	
High jump	Georges Damitio; France	2.00 m	Papagallo Thiam; France	1.90 m	Mihajlo Dimitrijević; Yugoslavia	1.80 m
Pole vault	Victor Sillon; France	4.00 m	Rigas Efstathiadis; Greece	4.00 m	Theodosios Balafas; Greece	3.90 m
Long jump	Boris Brnad; Yugoslavia	7.28 m	Dimitrios Kipouros; Greece	6.96 m	Avni Akgün; Turkey	6.85 m
Triple jump	Akın Altıok; Turkey	14.15 m	Victor Sillon; France	14.13 m	Fawzi Chaaban; Egypt	14.09 m
Shot put	Konstantinos Giataganas; Greece	15.03 m	Angiolo Profeti; Italy	15.02 m	Nuri Turan; Turkey	14.71 m
Discus throw	Giuseppe Tosi; Italy	48.49 m	Nikolaos Syllas; Greece	46.07 m	Konstantinos Giataganas; Greece	43.18 m
Hammer throw	Teseo Taddia; Italy	52.33 m	Ivan Gubijan; Yugoslavia	51.20 m	Rudolf Galin; Yugoslavia	50.43 m
Javelin throw	Branko Dangubić; Yugoslavia	65.82 m	Halil Zıraman; Turkey	63.62 m	Vassilios Kallimatis; Greece	59.57 m
Decathlon	Fotis Kosmas; Greece	5135 pts	Lorenzo Vecchiutti; Italy	5001 pts	Rachad Khadr; Egypt	4798 pts

== Results ==
=== 100 meters ===
Heats – 6 October

Rank	Heat	Name	Nationality	Time	Notes
1	1	Stefanos Petrakis	Greece	11.2	Q
2	1	Wolfango Montanari	Italy	11.3	Q
3	1	Fawzi Chaaban	Egypt	11.5	Q
4	1	George Bonello du Puis	Malta	11.7	Q
5	1	Nasser Attar	Lebanon	11.9	
1	2	Youssef Amer	Egypt	11.0	Q
2	2	Michail Tsolakis	Greece	11.3	Q
3	2	Franco Leccese	Italy	11.3	Q
4	2	Ialikaf	Syria	??.?	Q
1	3	Petar Pecelj	Yugoslavia	11.1	Q
2	3	Emad El-Din Shafei	Egypt	11.2	Q
3	3	Mauro Frizzoni	Italy	11.3	Q
4	3	Takis Ventikos	Greece	11.5	Q

Semifinals

Rank	Heat	Name	Nationality	Time	Notes
2	1	Wolfango Montanari	Italy	11.2	Q
3	1	Franco Leccese	Italy	11.3	Q
3	2	Mauro Frizzoni	Italy	11.4	Q

Final

Rank	Name	Nationality	Time	Notes
1st place, gold medalist(s)	Stefanos Petrakis	Greece	10.9	
2nd place, silver medalist(s)	Mauro Frizzoni	Italy	11.2	
3rd place, bronze medalist(s)	Wolfango Montanari	Italy	11.2	
4	Petar Pecelj	Yugoslavia	11.3	
5	Franco Leccese	Italy	11.6	
	Youssef Amer	Egypt	DNF	

=== 200 meters ===
Heats – 8 October

Rank	Heat	Name	Nationality	Time	Notes
1	1	Antonio Siddi	Italy	22.6	Q
2	1	Jacques Degats	France	23.0	Q
3	1	Vassilis Syllis	Greece	23.2	Q
4	1	Nasser Attar	Lebanon	24.0	Q
1	2	Wolfango Montanari	Italy	22.2	Q
2	2	Emad El-Din Shafei	Egypt	22.8	Q
3	2	Michail Tsolakis	Greece	23.0	Q
4	2	George Bonello du Puis	Malta	27.0	Q
1	3	Stefanos Petrakis	Greece	22.4	Q
2	3	Jean-Paul Martin du Gard	France	22.4	Q
3	3	Mauro Frizzoni	Italy	23.3	Q
4	3	Amin El Azim	Egypt	23.7	Q

Semifinals – 9 October

Rank	Heat	Name	Nationality	Time	Notes
1	1	Jacques Degats	France	23.7	Q
2	1	Wolfango Montanari	Italy	24.0	Q
3	1	Stefanos Petrakis	Greece	26.3	Q
1	2	Antonio Siddi	Italy	22.7	Q
2	2	Mauro Frizzoni	Italy	23.2	Q
3	2	Emad El-Din Shafei	Egypt	23.3	Q
4	2	Jean-Paul Martin du Gard	France	23.5	
5	2	Vassilis Syllis	Greece	23.7	

Final – 10 October

Rank	Name	Nationality	Time	Notes
1st place, gold medalist(s)	Antonio Siddi	Italy	22.0	
2nd place, silver medalist(s)	Jacques Degats	France	22.1	
3rd place, bronze medalist(s)	Wolfango Montanari	Italy	22.1	
4	Emad El-Din Shafei	Egypt	22.6	
5	Mauro Frizzoni	Italy	22.7	
6	Stefanos Petrakis	Greece	22.9	

=== 400 meters ===
Heats – 6 October

Rank	Heat	Name	Nationality	Time	Notes
1	1	Antonio Siddi	Italy	50.7	Q
2	1	Marko Račič	Yugoslavia	52.0	Q
3	1	Eddie Turner	Malta	54.2	
1	3	Jean-Paul Martin du Gard	France	50.1	Q
2	3	Armando Filiput	Italy	50.6	Q
3	3	Dros	Egypt	50.7	
4	3	Vassilios Sillis	Greece	51.0	

Final – 8 October

Rank	Name	Nationality	Time	Notes
1st place, gold medalist(s)	Jacques Degats	France	47.8	
2nd place, silver medalist(s)	Antonio Siddi	Italy	47.9	
3rd place, bronze medalist(s)	Zvonko Sabolović	Yugoslavia	48.6	
4	Jean-Paul Martin du Gard	France	49.1	
5	Armando Filiput	Italy	49.8	
	Marko Račič	Yugoslavia	DNF	

=== 800 meters ===
Heats – 6 October

Rank	Heat	Name	Nationality	Time	Notes
1	1	Andrija Otenhajmer	Yugoslavia	1:56.9	Q
2	1	Michel Clare	France	1:56.9	Q
3	1	Evangelos Depastas	Greece	1:58.3	Q

Final – 9 October

Rank	Name	Nationality	Time	Notes
1st place, gold medalist(s)	Patrick El Mabrouk	France	1:50.9	
2nd place, silver medalist(s)	Michel Clare	France	1:54.2	
3rd place, bronze medalist(s)	Ekrem Koçak	Turkey	1:54.7	
4	William Fahmy Hanna	Egypt	1:55.3	
5	Andrija Otenhajmer	Yugoslavia	1:55.9	
6	Evangelos Depastas	Greece	2:00.4	

=== 1500 meters ===
10 October

Rank	Name	Nationality	Time	Notes
1st place, gold medalist(s)	Patrick El Mabrouk	France	3:55.8	
2nd place, silver medalist(s)	Cahit Önel	Turkey	3:56.9	
3rd place, bronze medalist(s)	Zdravko Ceraj	Yugoslavia	4:01.5	
4	Ekrem Koçak	Turkey	4:03.0	
5	William Fahmy Hanna	Egypt	4:04.1	
6	Hawary Hassan	Egypt	4:23.6	

=== 5000 meters ===
9 October

Rank	Name	Nationality	Time	Notes
1st place, gold medalist(s)	Alain Mimoun	France	14:38.3	
2nd place, silver medalist(s)	Zdravko Ceraj	Yugoslavia	15:05.2	
3rd place, bronze medalist(s)	Stevan Pavlović	Yugoslavia	15:05.5	
4	Franjo Mihalić	Yugoslavia	15:07.9	
5	Vasilios Mavrapostolos	Greece	15:42.5	
6	Abdallah El Naffady	Egypt	??:??.?	

=== 10,000 meters ===
8 October

Rank	Name	Nationality	Time	Notes
1st place, gold medalist(s)	Alain Mimoun	France	31:07.9	
2nd place, silver medalist(s)	Franjo Mihalić	Yugoslavia	31:42.8	
3rd place, bronze medalist(s)	Mustafa Özcan	Turkey	34:27.5	
4	Mohamed Omran	Egypt	35:20.0	
5	Hassan Abdel Fattah	Egypt	35:41.0	
6	Abdallah El Naffady	Egypt	37:26.0	

=== Marathon ===
10 October

Rank	Name	Nationality	Time	Notes
1st place, gold medalist(s)	Ahmet Aytar	Turkey	3:07:25	
2nd place, silver medalist(s)	Athanasios Ragazos	Greece	3:21:31	
3rd place, bronze medalist(s)	Mohamed Omran	Egypt	3:24:24	
4	Dimitrios Dervinis	Greece	3:41:02	

=== 110 meters hurdles ===
Heats – 6 October

Rank	Heat	Name	Nationality	Time	Notes
1	1	Jean-François Brisson	France	15.2	Q
1	2	Ioannis Kambadellis	Greece	15.9	Q
2	2	Ahmed Saleh	Egypt	17.2	Q
3	2	Saïd Madbouli	Egypt	17.2	Q

Final – 7 October

Rank	Name	Nationality	Time	Notes
1st place, gold medalist(s)	Jean-François Brisson	France	15.5	
2nd place, silver medalist(s)	Ioannis Kambadellis	Greece	15.8	
3rd place, bronze medalist(s)	Mustafa Batman	Turkey	15.8	
4	Mohamed Soliman	Egypt	15.9	
5	Ahmed Saleh	Egypt	17.0	
6	Saïd Madbouli	Egypt	17.1	

=== 400 meters hurdles ===
Heats – 7 October

Rank	Heat	Name	Nationality	Time	Notes
1	1	Armando Filiput	Italy	56.2	Q
2	1	Emin Doybak	Turkey	57.6	Q
3	1	Abdulkadir Attya	Egypt	1:00.3	Q
1	2	Doğan Acarbay	Turkey	57.0	Q
2	2	Igor Zupančič	Yugoslavia	58.0	Q
3	2	Ahmed Saleh	Egypt	1:00.3	Q

Final – 8 October

Rank	Name	Nationality	Time	Notes
1st place, gold medalist(s)	Armando Filiput	Italy	53.8	
2nd place, silver medalist(s)	Doğan Acarbay	Turkey	55.1	
3rd place, bronze medalist(s)	Igor Zupančič	Yugoslavia	55.4	
4	Emin Doybak	Turkey	56.8	
5	Abdulkadir Attya	Egypt	1:00.0	
6	Ahmed Saleh	Egypt	1:01.6	

=== 3000 meters steeplechase ===
10 October

Rank	Name	Nationality	Time	Notes
1st place, gold medalist(s)	Božidar Đurašković	Yugoslavia	9:38.5	
2nd place, silver medalist(s)	Petar Šegedin	Yugoslavia	9:39.2	
3rd place, bronze medalist(s)	Mustafa Özcan	Turkey	9:44.9	
4	Dimitrios Melidonis	Greece	9:56.2	
5	Ali Hassan	Egypt	?:??.?	

=== 4 × 100 meters relay ===
9 October

Rank	Nation	Competitors	Time	Notes
1st place, gold medalist(s)	Italy	Wolfango Montanari, Franco Leccese, Antonio Siddi, Mauro Frizzoni	42.4	
2nd place, silver medalist(s)	Greece	Vassilis Syllis, Takis Ventikos, Michail Tsolakis, Stefanos Petrakis	43.5	
3rd place, bronze medalist(s)	Yugoslavia	Marko Račič, Zvonko Sabolović, Boris Brandl, Petar Pecelj	43.9	
4	Egypt		44.2	

=== 4 × 400 meters relay ===
10 October

Rank	Nation	Competitors	Time	Notes
1st place, gold medalist(s)	France	Jacques Degats, Jean-Paul Martin du Gard, Michel Clare, Patrick El Mabrouk	3:19.5	
2nd place, silver medalist(s)	Yugoslavia	Igor Zupančič, Andrija Otenhajmer, Marko Račič, Zvonko Sabolović	3:23.4	
3rd place, bronze medalist(s)	Turkey	Cahit Önel, Doğan Acarbay, Ekrem Koçak, Emin Doybak	3:25.9	
4	Egypt		3:29.4	
	Greece		DNS	

=== 10 kilometers walk ===
Rank	Name	Nationality	Time	Notes
1st place, gold medalist(s)	Pino Dordoni	Italy	51:39.6	
2nd place, silver medalist(s)	Athanasios Aposporis	Greece	54:28.0	
3rd place, bronze medalist(s)	Wahib Saleh	Egypt	1:04:20.9	
4	Gamil Gadaan	Egypt	1:12:36.9	

=== High jump ===
10 October

Rank	Name	Nationality	Result	Notes
1st place, gold medalist(s)	Georges Damitio	France	2.00	
2nd place, silver medalist(s)	Papagallo Thiam	France	1.90	
3rd place, bronze medalist(s)	Mihajlo Dimitrijević	Yugoslavia	1.80	
4	Alexandros Parodos	Greece	1.75	
5	Emad El-Din Shafei	Egypt	1.75	
6	Aras	Turkey	1.75	

=== Pole vault ===
9 October

Rank	Name	Nationality	Result	Notes
1st place, gold medalist(s)	Victor Sillon	France	4.00	
2nd place, silver medalist(s)	Rigas Efstathiadis	Greece	4.00	
3rd place, bronze medalist(s)	Theodosios Balafas	Greece	3.90	
4	Muhittin Akın	Turkey	3.80	
5	Gamal El-Din El-Sherbini	Egypt	3.60	

=== Long jump ===
8 October

Rank	Name	Nationality	Result	Notes
1st place, gold medalist(s)	Boris Brnad	Yugoslavia	7.28	
2nd place, silver medalist(s)	Dimitrios Kipouros	Greece	6.96	
3rd place, bronze medalist(s)	Avni Akgün	Turkey	6.85	
4	Ismail Mounib	Egypt	6.81	
5	Yarawant Bervekzyan	Egypt	6.70	
6	Nasser Attar	Lebanon	6.36	

=== Triple jump ===
Rank	Name	Nationality	Result	Notes
1st place, gold medalist(s)	Avni Akgün	Turkey	14.15	
2nd place, silver medalist(s)	Victor Sillon	France	14.13	
3rd place, bronze medalist(s)	Fawzi Chaaban	Egypt	14.09	
4	Atef Ismail	Egypt	13.15	
5	Bey Dedeyan	Egypt	12.78	
6	Mohamed Kalfa	Syria	11.89	

=== Shot put ===
8 October

Rank	Name	Nationality	Result	Notes
1st place, gold medalist(s)	Konstantinos Giataganas	Greece	15.03	
2nd place, silver medalist(s)	Angiolo Profeti	Italy	15.02	
3rd place, bronze medalist(s)	Nuri Turan	Turkey	14.71	
4	Petar Šarčević	Yugoslavia	14.39	
5	Gouda Attiya	Egypt	13.37	

=== Discus throw ===
9 October

Rank	Name	Nationality	Result	Notes
1st place, gold medalist(s)	Giuseppe Tosi	Italy	48.49	
2nd place, silver medalist(s)	Nikolaos Syllas	Greece	46.07	
3rd place, bronze medalist(s)	Konstantinos Giataganas	Greece	43.18	
4	Angelo Profeti	Italy	42.50	
5	Nuri Turan	Turkey	39.07	

=== Hammer throw ===
Rank	Name	Nationality	Result	Notes
1st place, gold medalist(s)	Teseo Taddia	Italy	52.33	
2nd place, silver medalist(s)	Ivan Gubijan	Yugoslavia	51.20	
3rd place, bronze medalist(s)	Rudolf Galin	Yugoslavia	50.43	
4	Toma Balcı	Turkey	47.33	
5	Dimos Papageorgiou	Greece	43.86	
6	Athanassios Kabaflis	Greece	36.86	

=== Javelin throw ===
10 October

Rank	Name	Nationality	Result	Notes
1st place, gold medalist(s)	Branko Dangubić	Yugoslavia	65.82	
2nd place, silver medalist(s)	Halil Zıraman	Turkey	63.62	
3rd place, bronze medalist(s)	Vassilios Kallimatis	Greece	59.57	
4	Dimos Papageorgiou	Greece	55.54	
5	Abdullah El Mardi	Egypt	54.38	
6	Ibrahim Abou Al Fadl	Egypt	45.43	

=== Decathlon ===
7–8 October

The highest mark recorded in each event is highlighted in yellow

Rank	Athlete	Nationality	100m	LJ	SP	HJ	400m	110m H	DT	PV	JT	1500m	Points	Notes
1st place, gold medalist(s)	Fotis Kosmas	Greece	11.8	6.19	10.52	1.60	51.0	16.8	31.54	3.10	48.28	4:40.0	5135	
2nd place, silver medalist(s)	Lorenzo Vecchiutti	Italy	12.3	6.33	11.43	1.76	54.3	16.4	34.28	3.30	39.89	4:59.0	5001	
3rd place, bronze medalist(s)	Rachad Khadr	Egypt	12.7	6.10	10.31	1.73	52.8	18.4		3.10	47.19	4:22.0	4798	
4	Mohamed Saïd Saki	Egypt	12.4	5.99	9.79	1.50	53.4				29.44		3860	
5	Mustafa Mohamed	Egypt	12.6	5.97	10.65	1.60	53.9		32.48		45.34	4:53.0	3799	
