= Yugoslavia at the 1951 Mediterranean Games =

- IOC code: YUG
- NOC: Yugoslav Olympic Committee

in Alexandria
- Competitors: 17 in 1 sport
- Medals Ranked 6th: Gold 3 Silver 5 Bronze 7 Total 15

Mediterranean Games appearances (overview)
- 1951; 1955; 1959; 1963; 1967; 1971; 1975; 1979; 1983; 1987; 1991

Other related appearances
- Bosnia and Herzegovina (1993–); Croatia (1993–); Slovenia (1993–); Serbia and Montenegro (1997–2005); Montenegro (2009–); Serbia (2009–); North Macedonia (2013–); Kosovo (2018–)

Yugoslavia competed at the 1951 Mediterranean Games held in Alexandria, Egypt.

== Medals by sport ==
Sport	Gold	Silver	Bronze	Total
Athletics	3	5	7	15
Totals (1 entries)	3	5	7	15

== Medalists ==
Medal	Name	Sport	Event
Gold	Boris Brnad	Athletics	Long jump
Gold	Božidar Đurašković	Athletics	3000 m Steeplechase
Gold	Branko Dangubić	Athletics	Javelin throw
Silver	Zdravko Ceraj	Athletics	5000 m
Silver	Franjo Mihalić	Athletics	10,000 m
Silver	Petar Šegedin	Athletics	3000 m Steeplechase
Silver	Igor Zupančič; Andrija Otenhajmer; Marko Račič; Zvonko Sabolović	Athletics	Men's 4x400 m
Silver	Ivan Gubijan	Athletics	Hammer throw
Bronze	Zvonko Sabolović	Athletics	400 m
Bronze	Zdravko Ceraj	Athletics	1500 m
Bronze	Stevan Pavlović	Athletics	5000 m
Bronze	Mihajlo Dimitrijević	Athletics	High Jump
Bronze	Igor Zupančič	Athletics	400 m hurdles
Bronze	Marko Račič; Zvonko Sabolović; Boris Brnad; Petar Pecelj	Athletics	Men's 4x100 m
Bronze	Rudolf Galin	Athletics	Hammer throw
