= Athletics at the 1948 Summer Olympics – Men's 4 × 100 metres relay =

Men's 4 × 100 metres relay at the Games of the XIV Olympiad
- Dates: August 6, 1948 (heats); August 7, 1948 (final)
- Competitors: from 15 nations
- Teams: 15
- Winning time: 40.6

Medalists
1st place, gold medalist(s)		Barney Ewell; Lorenzo Wright; Harrison Dillard; Mel Patton	United States
2nd place, silver medalist(s)		Alastair McCorquodale; Jack Gregory; Ken Jones; Jack Archer	Great Britain
3rd place, bronze medalist(s)		Michele Tito; Enrico Perucconi; Carlo Monti; Antonio Siddi	Italy

Official Video Highlights

The men's 4 × 100 metres relay event at the 1948 Olympic Games took place on August 6 & August 7. The United States team won the final, but was initially disqualified when officials thought the pass between Barney Ewell and Lorenzo Wright had taken place outside the zone. After further review, officials saw that the pass took place inside the zone, and restored U.S. results.

== Records ==
Prior to the competition, the existing World and Olympic records were as follows.

World record Olympic record	United States (Foy Draper, Ralph Metcalfe, Jesse Owens, Frank Wykoff)	39.8	Berlin, Germany	9 August 1936

== Schedule ==
All times are British Summer Time (UTC+1)

Date	Time	Round
Friday, 6 August 1948	16:00	Round 1
Saturday, 7 August 1948	15:30	Finals

== Results ==
=== Round 1 ===
Round 1 took place on 6 August. The first two teams from each heat advanced to the final.

Heat 1

Rank	Nation	Competitors	Time (hand)	Time (auto)	Notes
1	United States	Harrison Dillard, Barney Ewell, Mel Patton, Lorenzo Wright	41.1	41.20	Q
2	Italy	Carlo Monti, Enrico Perucconi, Antonio Siddi, Michele Tito	41.3	41.20	Q
3	Brazil	Haroldo da Silva, Hélio da Silva, Ivan Hausen, Rosalvo Ramos	42.4		
-	Turkey	Kemal Aksur, Erdal Barkay, Raşit Öztaş, Ruhi Sarıalp	DQ		

Heat 2

Rank	Nation	Competitors	Time (hand)	Time (auto)	Notes
1	Great Britain	Jack Archer, Jack Gregory, Ken Jones, Alastair McCorquodale	41.4	41.4	Q
2	Hungary	László Bartha, György Csányi, Béla Goldoványi, Ferenc Tima	41.4		Q
3	Australia	John Bartram, Bill Bruce, Morris Curotta, John Treloar	41.5		
4	Uruguay	Hércules Azcune, Mario Fayos, Juan López, Walter Pérez	42.8		
5	Bermuda	Hazzard Dill, Perry Johnson, Stanley Lines, Frank Mahoney	45.4		
-	Belgium	Fernand Bourgaux, Pol Braekman, Fernand Linssen, Isidoor Van De Wiele	DNF		

Heat 3

Rank	Nation	Competitors	Time (hand)	Notes
1	Netherlands	Jan Lammers, Jan Meijer, Gabe Scholten, Jo Zwaan	41.7	Q
2	Canada	Ted Haggis, Don McFarlane, James O'Brien, Don Pettie	42.3	Q
3	Argentina	Alberto Biedermann, Gerardo Bönnhoff, Carlos Isaac, Fernando Lapuente	42.4	
4	Iceland	Ásmundur Bjarnason, Haukur Clausen, Trausti Eyjólfsson, Finnbjörn Þorvaldsson	42.9	
-	France	Julien Lebas, Marc Litaudon, Alain Porthault, René Valmy	DNF	

=== Final ===
Rank	Nation	Competitors	Time (hand)	Time (auto)	Notes
1st place, gold medalist(s)	United States	Harrison Dillard, Barney Ewell, Mel Patton, Lorenzo Wright	40.6	40.70	
2nd place, silver medalist(s)	Great Britain	Jack Archer, Jack Gregory, Ken Jones, Alastair McCorquodale	41.3	41.41	
3rd place, bronze medalist(s)	Italy	Carlo Monti, Enrico Perucconi, Antonio Siddi, Michele Tito	41.5	41.71	
4	Hungary	László Bartha, György Csányi, Béla Goldoványi, Ferenc Tima	41.6	41.90	
5	Canada	Ted Haggis, Don McFarlane, James O'Brien, Don Pettie	41.9	41.92	
6	Netherlands	Jan Lammers, Jan Meijer, Gabe Scholten, Jo Zwaan	41.9	41.97	
