= Turkey at the 1951 Mediterranean Games =

- IOC code: TUR
- NOC: Turkish Olympic Committee

in Alexandria, Egypt
- Competitors: 52
- Medals Ranked 4th: Gold 10 Silver 3 Bronze 7 Total 20

Mediterranean Games appearances (overview)
- 1951; 1955; 1959; 1963; 1967; 1971; 1975; 1979; 1983; 1987; 1991; 1993; 1997; 2001; 2005; 2009; 2013; 2018; 2022

Turkey participated in the 1951 Mediterranean Games held in Alexandria, Egypt, from 5 to 20 October 1951, with a delegation of 34 male athletes. Turkish athletes competed only in athletics, basketball, and freestyle wrestling at the Games. Turkey won a total of 20 medals, including 10 golds, finishing fourth in the overall medal table.

Akın Altıok’s victory in the triple jump (14.15 m) marked Turkey’s first ever gold medal at the Mediterranean Games. Turkish wrestlers secured gold medals in all eight weight categories of freestyle wrestling. In addition, Turgut Atakol served as a referee in basketball, Ahmet Yener in wrestling, and Naili Moran and Jerfi Fıratlı in athletics.

== Medals ==
Medal	Athlete	Sport	Event
Gold	Hasan Gemici	Wrestling	Men's freestyle 52 kg
Gold	Cemal Sarıbacak	Wrestling	Men's freestyle 57 kg
Gold	Bayram Şit	Wrestling	Men's freestyle 62 kg
Gold	Tevfik Yüce	Wrestling	Men's freestyle 67 kg
Gold	Bekir Büke	Wrestling	Men's freestyle 73 kg
Gold	İsmet Atlı	Wrestling	Men's freestyle 79 kg
Gold	Bektaş Can	Wrestling	Men's freestyle 87 kg
Gold	Kemal Dişiçürük	Wrestling	Men's freestyle +87 kg
Gold	Ahmet Aytar	Athletics	Men's marathon
Gold	Akın Altıok	Athletics	Men's triple jump
Silver	Cahit Önel	Athletics	Men's 1500 m
Silver	Doğan Acarbay	Athletics	Men's 400 m hurdles
Silver	Halil Zıraman	Athletics	Men's javelin throw
Bronze	Mustafa Özcan	Athletics	Men's 10,000 m
Bronze	Ekrem Koçak	Athletics	Men's 800 m
Bronze	Avni Akgün	Athletics	Men's long jump
Bronze	Nuri Turan	Athletics	Men's shot put
Bronze	Mustafa Batman	Athletics	Men's 110 m hurdles
Bronze	Mustafa Özcan	Athletics	Men's 3000 m steeplechase
Bronze	Turkey team	Athletics	Men's 4×400 m relay

Sport	Gold	Silver	Bronze	Total
Athletics	2	3	7	12
Wrestling	8	0	0	8
Total	10	3	7	20
