= Mediterranean Athletics Championships =

- Inaugurated: 1947
- Most recent: 1949

The Mediterranean Athletics Championships (Greek: Μεσογειακοί Αγώνες Στίβου) were an annual outdoor track and field competition between nations in the Mediterranean region that took place from 1947 to 1949. These events were a precursor to the Mediterranean Games, founded in 1951.

The Hellenic Amateur Athletic Association (SEGAS) sought to establish a regular athletics competition for the region, and scheduled the first event for 28–30 June 1935 at the Panathenaic Stadium in Athens. Seven countries were invited (Greece, France, Italy, Turkey, Yugoslavia, Egypt and Mandatory Palestine), but political and economic complications in the build up to World War II saw the cancellation of the event. When the war concluded, SEGAS looked to revive the idea, particularly given that the Balkan Athletics Championships was not taking place at this time.

The first event was organised as the Eastern Mediterranean Athletics Championships (Greek: Αθλητικοί Αγώνες Ανατολικής Μεσογείου) and held at the Panathenaic Stadium on 28 September, 4 and 5 October 1947 with the participation of three countries: Greece (40 athletes), Turkey (28) and Palestine (15). The 22 events were between men only and featured two athletes from each country, and one team each for the relay. The marathon race was held over the classic route, from Marathon, Greece to the Panathenaic Stadium. A total of 19 athletes participated in the marathon: 2 Turks, 2 Greeks and 15 other Greek runners not part of the team competition. Stylianos Kyriakides (2:56:15) was runner-up, with Turkey's Mustafa Kaplan in third with 3:04:20. Hammer throw was also held at the Panellinios G.S. stadium on 2 October. The Balkan relay event was over 1500 metres, with four legs divided into distances of 800 m, 400 m, 200 m, and 100 m. A team system allocated points based on finishing position, running from six points for first place to one point for sixth place. Turkey won the points competition, with Turkish athletes winning 14 events.

The event returned the following year, taking place at İnönü Stadium in Istanbul on 6, 12 and 13 June 1948, though there was reduced participation with only three countries: Greece, Turkey, Persia. Again 22 men's events were contested and Turkey topped the points table, though the marathon race was not included in the scoring. The marathon course had a difficult looped route, starting from İnönü Stadium, on to Tarabya, Büyükdere, Sarıyer and Beykoz Park, then back to İnönü Stadium. Five athletes finished the race. Hassan Yildirim finished in second with 3:08:46.0 and Christos Vartzakis was third in 3:13:24.2.

A third edition followed, but a diplomatic fall out between the Greek and Turkish national sports administrators, caused by events earlier that year at a Mediterranean Cup football match, meant only Turkey and five Italians athletes took part. The competition returned to Istanbul's İnönü Stadium from 9–11 September 1949. A reduced programme of 12 men's events took place, with Italy winning nine of them.

== Editions ==
Ed.	Year	Stadium	City	Country	Events
–	1935	Panathenaic Stadium	Athens	Greece	—N/a
1	1947	Panathenaic Stadium	Athens	Greece	22
2	1948	İnönü Stadium	Istanbul	Turkey	22
3	1949	İnönü Stadium	Istanbul	Turkey	12

== Participation ==
Country	Editions
Turkey	1947, 1948, 1949
Greece	1947, 1948
Italy	1949
Mandatory Palestine	1947
Persia	1948

== 1947 ==
=== Winners ===
Event	Winner	Country	Performance
100 m	Yehuda Gabay	Mandatory Palestine	11.2
200 m	Kemal Aksur	Turkey	22.9
400 m	Adnan	Turkey	51.7
800 m	Adnan	Turkey	1:57.9
1500 m	Cahit Önel	Turkey	4:04.0
5000 m	Cahit Önel	Turkey	15:29.8
10,000 m	Osman Coşgül	Turkey	33:46.5
Marathon	Şevki Koru	Turkey	2:52:15.0
110 m hurdles	Erdal Barkay	Turkey	15.9
400 m hurdles	Lazaros Petropoulakis	Greece	59.9
3000 m s'chase	Cahit Önel	Turkey	9:43.8
4 × 100 m relay	?	Turkey	43.9
4 × 400 m relay	?	Turkey	3:33.9
Balkan relay	?	Turkey	3:33.0
Long jump	Giorgos Marinakis	Greece	6.86 m
High jump	Ioannis Lambrou	Greece	1.75 m
Triple jump	Ruhi Sarıalp	Turkey	14.37 m
Pole vault	Theodosios Balafas	Greece	3.70 m
Shot put	Konstantinos Giataganas	Greece	14.68 m
Discus throw	Nikolaos Syllas	Greece	45.03 m
Javelin throw	Ioannis Pappas	Greece	59.49 m
Hammer throw	Thomas Baltzis	Turkey	43.74 m

=== Points table ===
Position	Country	First placings	Second placings	Third placings	Points
1	Turkey	14	8	7	197
2	Greece	7	14	8	193
3	Mandatory Palestine	1	0	7	69

== 1948 ==
=== Winners ===
Event	Winner	Country	Performance
100 m	Kemal Aksur	Turkey	10.9
200 m	Stefanos Petrakis	Greece	22.5
400 m	Kemal Horulu	Turkey	50.9
800 m	Seidis	Turkey	1:56.9
1500 m	Cahit Önel	Turkey	4:11.2
5000 m	Cahit Önel	Turkey	15:33.3
10,000 m	Vasilios Mavrapostolos	Greece	32:38.1
110 m hurdles	Periklis Tambakopoulos	Greece	15.8
400 m hurdles	Kemal Horulu	Turkey	55.4
3000 m s'chase	Cahit Önel	Turkey	9:37.0
4 × 100 m relay	Periklis Tambakopoulos; Ventikos; Zafiris; Stefanos Petrakis	Greece	43.3
4 × 400 m relay	?	Turkey	3:25.0
Balkan relay	?	Turkey	3:22.5
Long jump	Kyros Marinis	Greece	7.05 m
High jump	Alexandros Parodos	Greece	1.85 m
Triple jump	Ruhi Sarıalp	Turkey	14.45 m
Pole vault	Theodosios Balafas	Greece	3.70 m
Shot put	Konstantinos Giataganas	Greece	14.17 m
Discus throw	Nikolaos Syllas	Greece	44.67 m
Javelin throw	Halil Zıraman	Turkey	57.60 m
Hammer throw	Thomas Baltzis	Turkey	43.34 m
Marathon	Ali Karaduman	Turkey	2:59:25.4

=== Points table ===
Position	Country	First placings	Second placings	Third placings	Points
1	Turkey	13	12	6	198
2	Greece	9	10	12	186
3	Persia	0	0	3	64

== 1949 ==
=== Winners ===
Event	Winner	Country	Performance
100 m	Antonio Siddi	Italy	11.4
200 m	Antonio Siddi	Italy	22.0
400 m	Antonio Siddi	Italy	50.5
800 m	Aldo Fracassi	Italy	1:58.6
Marathon	Mustafa Kaplan	Turkey	2:41:16.0
110 m hurdles	Mustafa Batman	Turkey	15.3
Long jump	Antonio Siddi	Italy	6.90 m
High jump	Albano Albanese	Italy	1.80 m
Shot put	Angiolo Profeti	Italy	14.29 m
Discus throw	Angiolo Profeti	Italy	42.14 m
Javelin throw	Halil Zıraman	Turkey	61.31 m
Hammer throw	Teseo Taddia	Italy	53.535 m

=== Points table ===
Position	Country	Wins
1	Italy	9
2	Turkey	3
