= 1946 European Athletics Championships – Men's 100 metres =

Men's 100 metres at the 1946 European Athletics Championships
- Venue: Bislett Stadium
- Location: Oslo
- Dates: 23 August
- Competitors: 24 from 14 nations
- Winning time: 10.6

Medalists
gold medal	Jack Archer	Great Britain
silver medal	Haakon Tranberg	Norway
bronze medal	Carlo Monti	Italy

The men's 100 metres at the 1946 European Athletics Championships was held in Oslo, Norway, at Bislett Stadium on 23 August 1946.

== Participation ==
According to an unofficial count, 24 athletes from 14 countries participated in the event.

- Belgium (2)
- Czechoslovakia (2)
- Denmark (2)
- Finland (1)
- France (2)
- Iceland (1)
- Italy (2)
- Netherlands (2)
- Norway (2)
- Poland (1)
- Soviet Union (1)
- Sweden (2)
- Great Britain (2)
- Yugoslavia (2)

== Results ==
=== Heats ===
23 August

==== Heat 1 ====
Rank	Name	Nationality	Time	Notes
1	Finnbjörn Þorvaldsson	Iceland	10.8	Q, NR
2	Carlo Monti	Italy	10.9	Q
3	Jan Lammers	Netherlands	10.9	Q
4	Józef Rutkowski	Poland	11.0	
5	Fernand Bourgaux	Belgium	11.2	

==== Heat 2 ====
Rank	Name	Nationality	Time	Notes
1	Stig Håkansson	Sweden	10.8	Q
2	Giusto Cattoni	Italy	11.0	Q
3	Jiří David	Czechoslovakia	11.1	Q
4	Kalevi Huttunen	Finland	11.2	
	Marko Račič	Yugoslavia	DQ	

==== Heat 3 ====
Rank	Name	Nationality	Time	Notes
1	Pol Braekman	Belgium	10.7	Q
2	Stig Danielsson	Sweden	10.8	Q
3	Jo Zwaan	Netherlands	10.9	Q
4	Bert Liffen	Great Britain	10.9	
5	Marijan Slanac	Yugoslavia	11.0	

==== Heat 4 ====
Rank	Name	Nationality	Time	Notes
1	Jack Archer	Great Britain	10.6	Q
2	Étienne Bally	France	10.8	Q
3	Mirko Paráček	Czechoslovakia	10.9	Q
4	Arne Thisted	Denmark	11.0	
5	Kjell Mangseth	Norway	11.2	

==== Heat 5 ====
Rank	Name	Nationality	Time	Notes
1	Haakon Tranberg	Norway	10.8	Q
2	Nikolay Karakulov	Soviet Union	10.8	Q
3	René Valmy	France	10.9	Q
4	Tage Egemose	Denmark	11.0	

=== Semi-finals ===
23 August

==== Semi-final 1 ====
Rank	Name	Nationality	Time	Notes
1	Jack Archer	Great Britain	10.6	Q
2	Stig Håkansson	Sweden	10.7	Q
3	Nikolay Karakulov	Soviet Union	10.7	
4	Jan Lammers	Netherlands	10.8	
5	Giusto Cattoni	Italy	11.0	

==== Semi-final 2 ====
Rank	Name	Nationality	Time	Notes
1	Étienne Bally	France	10.6	Q
2	Carlo Monti	Italy	10.7	Q
3	Pol Braekman	Belgium	10.8	
4	Jiří David	Czechoslovakia	10.9	
5	Jo Zwaan	Netherlands	10.9	

==== Semi-final 3 ====
Rank	Name	Nationality	Time	Notes
1	Haakon Tranberg	Norway	10.7	Q
2	Finnbjörn Þorvaldsson	Iceland	10.8	Q, NR
3	René Valmy	France	10.8	
4	Stig Danielsson	Sweden	10.9	
5	Mirko Paráček	Czechoslovakia	11.0	

=== Final ===
23 August

Rank	Name	Nationality	Time	Notes
1st place, gold medalist(s)	Jack Archer	Great Britain	10.6	
2nd place, silver medalist(s)	Haakon Tranberg	Norway	10.7	
3rd place, bronze medalist(s)	Carlo Monti	Italy	10.8	
4	Étienne Bally	France	10.8	
5	Stig Håkansson	Sweden	10.8	
6	Finnbjörn Þorvaldsson	Iceland	10.9	
