= 1947 International University Games =

Multi-sport event in Paris, France

Official poster

The 1947 International University Games were organised by the Confederation Internationale des Etudiants (CIE) and held in Paris, France, between 24 and 31 August. At these games a number of athletic and cycling events were contested.

== Athletics ==
The results were as follows:

=== Men's events ===
A newsreel showing some of the events

Event	Gold		Silver		Bronze	
100 Metres	John Wilkinson (ENG)	10.5	John Fairgrieve (ENG)	10.8	Quamina Cofie (SCO)	10.8
200 Metres	John Wilkinson (ENG)	22.2	Jirí David (TCH)	22.3	Quamina Cofie (SCO)	22.5
400 Metres	Folke Alnevik (SWE)	48.1	Peter Wallis (ENG)	48.6	Pierre Le Gallais (FRA)	48.8
800 Metres	Harold Tarraway (ENG)	1:54.4	Carl-Göran Lindelöw (SWE)	1:54.6	Josy Barthel (LUX)	1:54.7
1500 Metres	Emil Zátopek (TCH)	3:52.8	François Quilici (FRA)	3:53.6	Luboš Vomácka (TCH)	3:55.0
5000 Metres	Emil Zátopek (TCH)	14:20.8	Claude Joly (FRA)	15:12.4	Pierre Barbaud (FRA)	15:15.4
110 Metres Hurdles	Albano Albanese (ITA)	14.9	Milan Tosnar (TCH)	15.2	Jacques Richard (FRA)	15.3
400 Metres Hurdles	Jean-Claude Arifon (FRA)	52.3	Armando Filiput (ITA)	55.2	Ronald Ede (ENG)	55.4
4 x 100 Metres Relay	(Hungary) Hungary; László Bartha; György Csányi; Ferenc Tima; Béla Goldoványi	42.1	(Italy) Italy; Enrico Perucconi; Michele Tito; Giuseppe Guzzi; Piero Bassetti	42.1	(Czechoslovakia) Czechoslovakia; Jiří David; Miroslav Horčic; Mirko Paráček; Jan Schmid	42.3
4 x 400 Metres Relay	(France) France; André Sigonney; Armand Jacquier; Pierre Le Gallais; Jean-Claude Arifon	3:15.0	(Sweden) Sweden; Folke Alnevik; Nils Toll; Carl-Göran Lindelöw; Bengt Sigvard Palm	3:16.6	(Italy) Italy; Armando Filiput; Luigi Paterlini; Agostino Ercolessi; Giorgio Zitelli	3:18.2
1600 Metres Medley Relay	(Sweden) Sweden; Folke Alnevik; Erland Fridén; Carl-Göran Lindelöw; Lennart Palm	3:27.0	(France) France; Jean-Claude Arifon; Marc Litaudon; André Sigonney; Jacques Rasse	3:27.8	(Hungary) Hungary; Ferenc Bánhalmi; György Csányi; Sándor Garay; Béla Goldoványi	3:28.4
High Jump	Ivar Vind (DEN)	1.93	Václav Hausenblas (TCH)	1.90	Georges Damitio (FRA)	1.85
Pole Vault	Zoltán Zsitvay (HUN)	4.00	Georges Breitman (FRA)	3.90	Allan Svensson (SWE)	3.70
Long Jump	Felix Würth (AUT)	7.22	Albín Hisein (TCH)	7.14	Miroslav Řihošek (TCH)	7.04
Triple Jump	Felix Würth (AUT)	14.62	Milan John (TCH)	14.50	Allan Svensson (SWE)	14.28
Shot	Cestmír Kalina (TCH)	14.53	Solwe Johansson (SWE)	13.67	Carl-Erik Ström (SWE)	13.38
Discus	Ferenc Klics (HUN)	47.80	Jaroslav Sedlácek (TCH)	44.76	Gilbert Jallu (FRA)	42.72
Javelin	József Várszegi (HUN)	66.45	Stig Olden (SWE)	63.86	Amos Matteucci (ITA)	60.78
Pentathlon	Pierre Sprecher (FRA)	3277.00	Gösta Astell (SWE)	3225.00	Heinrich Hofbauer (AUT)	3088.00

=== Women's events ===
Event	Gold		Silver		Bronze	
100 Metres	Eevje Piel (NED)	12.6	Exartier (FRA)	12.6	Tilly Decker (LUX)	12.7
200 Metres	Dana Hiklová (TCH)	26.0	Quita Shivas (GBR)	26.8	Tilly Decker (LUX)	26.8
80 Metres Hurdles	Mirja Jämes (FIN)	11.9	Elda Franco (ITA)	12.1	Jacqueline Couamet (FRA)	12.4
4 x 100 Metres Relay	(France) France; Odile Exartier; Jacqueline Couamet; Algan; Jacqueline Dufour	50.7	(Czechoslovakia) Czechoslovakia; Dana Hiklová; Danuše Klesnilová; Hana Zentnerová; Eva Preusová	52.0	Austria	54.2
High Jump	Micheline Ostermeyer (FRA)	1.56	Bertha Zach (AUT)	1.45?	Mária Rohonczi (HUN)	1.45
Long Jump	Eevje Piel (NED)	5.47	Elda Franco (ITA)	5.07	Algan (FRA)	4.95
Shot	Micheline Ostermeyer (FRA)	12.73	Lotte Haidegger (AUT)	11.21	Matilda Regdánszky (HUN)	11.01
Discus	Lotte Haidegger (AUT)	38.40	Ilse Bolzmann (AUT)	33.16	Theresia Pachoschwoll (AUT)	31.70
Javelin	Matilda Regdánszky (HUN)	38.86	Gerda Schilling (AUT)	38.22	Mária Rohonczi (HUN)	37.77

== Cycling ==
Event	Gold	Silver	Bronze
Men's event
Road Race	Willy Kemp; Luxembourg		
Individual Pursuit			Willy Kemp; Luxembourg
Team Pursuit		Luxembourg; Willy Kemp	

== Medal table ==
incomplete (of the 28 athletics events, only 25/26 are listed)

Rank	Nation	Gold	Silver	Bronze	Total
1	France (FRA)	6	5	7	18
2	Czechoslovakia (TCH)	4	6	2	12
3	Austria (AUT)	3	3	2	8
4	England (ENG)	3	2	1	6
5	Hungary (HUN)	3	0	3	6
6	Sweden (SWE)	2	5	3	10
7	Netherlands (NED)	2	0	0	2
8	Italy (ITA)	1	3	2	6
9	Luxembourg (LUX)	1	2	3	6
10	Denmark (DEN)	1	0	0	1
10	Finland (FIN)	1	0	0	1
12	Great Britain (GBR)	0	1	0	1
13	Scotland (SCO)	0	0	2	2
Totals (13 entries)		27	27	25	79

== See also ==
- FISU World University Games § Precursors
- University and college sport
