= 1946 European Athletics Championships – Men's 4 × 100 metres relay =

Men's 4 × 100 metres relay at the European Athletics Championships

The men's 4 × 100 metres relay at the 1946 European Athletics Championships was held in Oslo, Norway, at Bislett Stadion on 24 and 25 August 1946.

== Medalists ==
Gold	Stig Danielsson; Inge Nilsson; Olle Laessker; Stig Håkansson; Sweden
Silver	Agathon Lepève; Julien Lebas; Pierre Gonon; René Valmy; France
Bronze	Mirko Paráček; Leopold Láznička; Miroslav Řihošek; Jiří David; Czechoslovakia

== Results ==
=== Final ===
25 August

Rank	Nation	Competitors	Time	Notes
1st place, gold medalist(s)	Sweden	Stig Danielsson; Inge Nilsson; Olle Laessker; Stig Håkansson	41.5	
2nd place, silver medalist(s)	France	Agathon Lepève; Julien Lebas; Pierre Gonon; René Valmy	42.0	
3rd place, bronze medalist(s)	Czechoslovakia	Mirko Paráček; Leopold Láznička; Miroslav Řihošek; Jiří David	42.2	NR
4	Netherlands	Jan Lammers; Chris van Osta; Jo Zwaan; Gabe Scholten	42.3	
5	Great Britain	Thomas Jover; Bert Liffen; Robert Roach; Jack Archer	42.4	
6	Belgium	Herman Kunnen; Fernand Bourgaux; François Braekman; Pol Braekman	43.5	

=== Heats ===
24 August

==== Heat 1 ====
Rank	Nation	Competitors	Time	Notes
1	Great Britain	Thomas Jover; Bert Liffen; Robert Roach; Jack Archer	42.3h	Q
2	Belgium	Herman Kunnen; Fernand Bourgaux; François Braekman; Pol Braekman	42.4h	Q
3	Czechoslovakia	Mirko Paráček; Leopold Láznička; Miroslav Řihošek; Jiří David	42.6	NR, Q
4	Norway	Kjell Mangset; Peter Bloch; Rolf Bakken; Haakon Tranberg	42.8h	
5	Denmark	Tage Egemose; Børge Stougaard; Gunnar Christensen; Arne Thisted	43.1h	

==== Heat 2 ====
Rank	Nation	Competitors	Time	Notes
1	Sweden	Stig Danielsson; Inge Nilsson; Olle Laessker; Stig Håkansson	41.9h	Q
2	France	Agathon Lepève; Julien Lebas; Pierre Gonon; René Valmy	42.3h	Q
3	Netherlands	Jan Lammers; Chris van Osta; Jo Zwaan; Gabe Scholten	42.4h	Q
4	Italy	Michele Tito; Giusto Cattoni; Carlo Manara; Carlo Monti	42.5h	

== Participation ==
According to an unofficial count, 36 athletes from 9 countries participated in the event.

- Belgium (4)
- Czechoslovakia (4)
- Denmark (4)
- France (4)
- Italy (4)
- Netherlands (4)
- Norway (4)
- Sweden (4)
- Great Britain (4)
