= 1946 European Athletics Championships – Men's 200 metres =

Men's 200 metres at the 1946 European Athletics Championships
- Venue: Bislett Stadion
- Location: Oslo
- Dates: 24 August (heats, semi-finals & final)
- Competitors: 22 from 14 nations
- Winning time: 21.6

Medalists
gold medal	Nikolay Karakulov	Soviet Union
silver medal	Haakon Tranberg	Norway
bronze medal	Jiří David	Czechoslovakia

The men's 200 metres at the 1946 European Athletics Championships was held in Oslo, Norway, at Bislett Stadion on 24 August 1946.

== Participation ==
According to an unofficial count, 22 athletes from 14 countries participated in the event.

- Belgium (2)
- Czechoslovakia (2)
- Denmark (1)
- France (2)
- Great Britain (2)
- Hungary (1)
- Iceland (1)
- Italy (2)
- Netherlands (2)
- Norway (1)
- Poland (2)
- Soviet Union (1)
- Sweden (2)
- Yugoslavia (1)

== Results ==
=== Heats ===
24 August

==== Heat 1 ====
Rank	Name	Nationality	Time	Notes
1	Nikolay Karakulov	Soviet Union	21.9	Q
2	Stig Danielsson	Sweden	21.9	Q
3	Carlo Monti	Italy	22.3	Q
4	Gabe Scholten	Netherlands	22.4	
5	Roman Sienicki	Poland	23.6	

==== Heat 2 ====
Rank	Name	Nationality	Time	Notes
1	Jiří David	Czechoslovakia	22.3	Q
2	Finnbjörn Þorvaldsson	Iceland	22.4	Q
3	Chris van Osta	Netherlands	22.5	Q
4	Gerhard Fehrm	Sweden	22.7	
5	Vanes Montanari	Italy	24.1	

==== Heat 3 ====
Rank	Name	Nationality	Time	Notes
1	Julien Lebas	France	22.2	Q
2	Jack Archer	Great Britain	22.2	Q
3	Fernand Bourgaux	Belgium	22.7	Q
4	Børge Stougaard	Denmark	22.8	
5	Egon Solymossy	Hungary	23.1	
6	Marko Račič	Yugoslavia	23.6	

==== Heat 4 ====
Rank	Name	Nationality	Time	Notes
1	Haakon Tranberg	Norway	22.1	Q
2	Agathon Lepève	France	22.3	Q
3	Mirko Paráček	Czechoslovakia	22.5	Q
4	François Braekman	Belgium	22.6	
5	Józef Rutkowski	Poland	22.8	
6	Robert Roach	Great Britain	23.1	

=== Semi-finals ===
24 August

==== Heat 1 ====
Rank	Name	Nationality	Time	Notes
1	Jack Archer	Great Britain	22.0	Q
2	Jiří David	Czechoslovakia	22.1	Q
3	Nikolay Karakulov	Soviet Union	22.1	Q
4	Agathon Lepève	France	22.2	
5	Mirko Paráček	Czechoslovakia	22.7	
	Chris van Osta	Netherlands	DNS	

==== Heat 2 ====
Rank	Name	Nationality	Time	Notes
1	Stig Danielsson	Sweden	22.0	Q
2	Haakon Tranberg	Norway	22.0	Q
3	Julien Lebas	France	22.1	Q
4	Fernand Bourgaux	Belgium	22.2	
5	Carlo Monti	Italy	22.2	
6	Finnbjörn Þorvaldsson	Iceland	22.3	

=== Final ===
24 August

Rank	Name	Nationality	Time	Notes
1st place, gold medalist(s)	Nikolay Karakulov	Soviet Union	21.6	NR
2nd place, silver medalist(s)	Haakon Tranberg	Norway	21.7	
3rd place, bronze medalist(s)	Jiří David	Czechoslovakia	21.8	
4	Stig Danielsson	Sweden	21.9	
5	Julien Lebas	France	22.0	
6	Jack Archer	Great Britain	22.0	
