= 1953 International Cross Country Championships =

- Organisers: ICCU
- Edition: 40th
- Date: March 21
- Host city: Vincennes, Île-de-France, France
- Venue: Hippodrome de Vincennes
- Events: 1
- Distances: 9 mi (14.5 km)
- Participation: 89 athletes from 10 nations

The 1953 International Cross Country Championships was held in Vincennes, France, at the Hippodrome de Vincennes on March 21, 1953. A report on the event was given in the Glasgow Herald.

Complete results, medalists, and the results of British athletes were published.

== Medalists ==
Event	Gold		Silver		Bronze	
Individual
Men; 9 mi (14.5 km)	Franjo Mihalić; Yugoslavia	47:53	Frank Sando; England	48:03	Abdallah Ould Lamine; France	48:06
Team
Men	England	64	France	84	Yugoslavia	129

== Individual Race Results ==
=== Men's (9 mi / 14.5 km) ===
Rank	Athlete	Nationality	Time
1st place, gold medalist(s)	Franjo Mihalić	Yugoslavia	47:53
2nd place, silver medalist(s)	Frank Sando	England	48:03
3rd place, bronze medalist(s)	Abdallah Ould Lamine	France	48:06
4	Eddie Bannon	Scotland	48:22
5	Fred Norris	England	48:40
6	Bill Gray	England	48:41
7	Pierre Prat	France	48:47
8	Buenaventura Baldoma	Spain	48:51
9	Mohamed Bouali	France	48:53
10	Hans Frischknecht	Switzerland	48:56
11	Jim Peters	England	49:00
12	Andy Forbes	Scotland	49:09
13	Marcel Vandewattyne	Belgium	49:21
14	Antonio Amoros	Spain	49:23
15	André Lecat	France	49:34
16	Boualem Labadie	France	49:39
17	Jose Coll	Spain	49:44
18	Stevan Pavlović	Yugoslavia	49:54
19	Gordon Pirie	England	50:01
20	Domica Cetinic	Yugoslavia	50:22
21	Patrick Ranger	England	50:28
22	Lucien Theys	Belgium	50:42
23	Dennis Holden	England	50:46
24	Maurits van Laere	Belgium	50:51
25	Đorđe Stefanović	Yugoslavia	51:08
26	Svetislav Jovanović	Yugoslavia	51:09
27	Roger Serroels	Belgium	51:10
28	Jaime Guixa	Spain	51:13
29	Davy Harrison	Ireland	51:31
30	Archie Gibson	Scotland	51:34
31	Phil Morgan	Wales	51:41
32	August Sutter	Switzerland	51:43
33	Clark Wallace	Scotland	51:44
34	Ali Ou Bassou	France	51:45
35	José Teixeira	Spain	51:47
36	Johnny Marshall	Ireland	51:48
37	Yves Furic	France	51:58
38	Jan Adriaansen	Netherlands	52:05
39	Zdravko Ceraj	Yugoslavia	52:07
40	Pavle Basic	Yugoslavia	52:13
41	Francisco Irizar	Spain	52:18
42	Gottlieb Stäubli	Switzerland	52:22
43	Felicito Cerezo	Spain	52:22
44	José Quesada	Spain	52:36
45	Roger Tombeur	Belgium	52:39
46	Peter Griggs	Wales	52:41
47	Don Appleby	Ireland	52:45
48	Joseph West	Ireland	52:50
49	Jean-Louis Com	France	52:58
50	Alex Breckenridge	Scotland	53:07
51	Adrianus van der Zande	Netherlands	53:12
52	Frank Sinclair	Scotland	53:14
53	J. Morgan	Ireland	53:28
54	Doug Rees	Wales	53:38
55	Pierre Page	Switzerland	53:39
56	Richard Daniels	Belgium	53:39
57	Cees de Koning	Netherlands	53:46
58	Tom Wood	Wales	53:46
59	Emmet Farrell	Scotland	53:49
60	Jean Simonet	Belgium	53:55
61	Dyfrigg Rees	Wales	54:22
62	Erwin Bühler	Switzerland	54:25
63	Leo Besters	Netherlands	54:26
64	Walter Glauser	Switzerland	54:45
65	Tom Stevenson	Scotland	54:50
66	Albert Känzig	Switzerland	54:58
67	Tom Richards	Wales	55:23
68	Tom O'Mahoney	Ireland	55:30
69	S. Casey	Ireland	55:55
70	Henk van der Veerdonk	Netherlands	56:24
71	Paddy Ross	Ireland	56:52
72	Georg Steiner	Switzerland	58:02
73	Willy Weert	Netherlands	58:57
74	André Paris	France	59:10
75	Lyn Bevan	Wales	59:52
76	Frans Künen	Netherlands	
—	Velimir Ilic	Yugoslavia	DNF
—	Antonio Teixeira	Spain	DNF
—	Bill Boak	England	DNF
—	Ted Dalton	England	DNF
—	Frans Wauters	Belgium	DNF
—	Siem Bobeldijk	Netherlands	DNF
—	J. McClelland	Ireland	DNF
—	Joe Stevenson	Scotland	DNF
—	Ken Huckle	Wales	DNF
—	Norman Wilson	Wales	DNF
—	Karl Gschwend	Switzerland	DNF
—	René De Rey	Belgium	DNF
—	Arie Verbaan	Netherlands	DNF

== Team Results ==
=== Men's ===
Rank	Country	Team	Points
1	England	Frank Sando; Fred Norris; Bill Gray; Jim Peters; Gordon Pirie; Patrick Ranger	64
2	France	Abdallah Ould Lamine; Pierre Prat; Mohamed Bouali; André Lecat; Boualem Labadie; Ali Ou Bassou	84
3	Yugoslavia	Franjo Mihalić; Stevan Pavlovic; Domica Cetinic; Djordje Stefanovic; Svetislav Jovanovic; Zdravko Ceraj	129
4	Spain	Buenaventura Baldoma; Antonio Amoros; Jose Coll; Jaime Guixa; José Teixeira; Francisco Irizar	143
5	Scotland	Eddie Bannon; Andy Forbes; Archie Gibson; Clark Wallace; Alex Breckenridge; Frank Sinclair	181
6	Belgium	Marcel Vandewattyne; Lucien Theys; Maurits van Laere; Roger Serroels; Roger Tombeur; Richard Daniels	187
7	Switzerland	Hans Frischknecht; August Sutter; Gottlieb Stäubli; Pierre Page; Erwin Bühler; Walter Glauser	265
8	Ireland	Davy Harrison; Johnny Marshall; Don Appleby; Joseph West; J. Morgan; Tom O'Mahoney	281
9	Wales	Phil Morgan; Peter Griggs; Doug Rees; Tom Wood; Dyfrigg Rees; Tom Richards	317
10	Netherlands	Jan Adriaansen; Adrianus van der Zande; Cees de Koning; Leo Besters; Henk van der Veerdonk; Willy Weert	352

== Participation ==
An unofficial count yields the participation of 89 athletes from 10 countries.

- Belgium (9)
- England (9)
- France (9)
- Ireland (9)
- Netherlands (9)
- Scotland (9)
- Spain (9)
- Switzerland (9)
- Wales (9)
- Yugoslavia (8)
