= Eyjólfsson =

Eyjólfsson is a surname. Notable people with the surname include:

- Ásgeir Eyjólfsson (1929–2021), Icelandic skier
- Egill Eyjólfsson (1295–1341), Icelandic Roman Catholic bishop
- Gísli Eyjólfsson (born 1994), Icelandic footballer
- Gunnar Eyjólfsson (1926–2016), Icelandic actor
- Hólmar Örn Eyjólfsson (born 1990), Icelandic football player
- Sigurður Ragnar Eyjólfsson (born 1973), Icelandic football player
- Trausti Eyjólfsson (1927–2010), Icelandic sprinter
