= Božidar Đurašković =

Yugoslav middle-distance runner

Božidar Ðurašković
Personal information
- Nationality: Yugoslav / Montenegrin
- Born: 27 December 1924 Ulcinj, Kingdom of Yugoslavia
- Height: 1.84 m (6 ft 0 in)
- Weight: 60 kg (132 lb)

Sport
- Sport: Athletics
- Event: 3000 m steeplechase
- Club: AK Partizan

Achievements and titles
- Personal best: 3000 m st. – 9:04.0 (1952)
Medal record
Representing Yugoslavia
Mediterranean Games
| Gold medal – first place | 1951 Alexandria | 3000 m st. |

Božidar Ðurašković (Serbian Cyrillic: Божидар Ђурашковић; born 27 December 1924) is a former Yugoslav middle distance runner who competed in the 1952 Summer Olympics. He was born in Ulcinj.
