= Mirja =

Mirja is a given name. Notable people with the given name include:

- Mirja Boes (born 1971), German comedian, actress, and singer
- Mirja Breitholtz, Swedish songwriter and producer
- Mirja Hietamies (1931–2013), Finnish cross-country skier
- Mirja Jämes (1924–2020), Finnish former hurdler
- Mirja Lehtonen (1942–2009), Finnish cross-country skier
- Mirja Mane (1929–1974), Finnish actress
- Mirja Ojanen (born 1967), Finnish ski-orienteering competitor
- Mirja Puhakka (born 1955), Finnish ski-orienteering competitor
- Mirja Ryynänen (born 1944) is a Finnish politician
- Mirja Turestedt (born 1972), Swedish actress
- Mirja Vehkaperä (born 1976), Finnish politician
