= Ceraj =

Ceraj is a surname. Within Slovenia, it is most prevalent in the region of Savinja.

Notable people with this surname include:

- Matjaž Ceraj (born 1983), Slovenian judoka
- Zdravko Ceraj (1920–2011), Croatian long-distance runner
