= Wrestling at the 1951 Mediterranean Games =

Wrestling competition

- Dates: October 1951

The wrestling tournament at the 1951 Mediterranean Games was held in Alexandria, Egypt.

== Medal table ==
* Host nation (Egypt)

Rank	Nation	Gold	Silver	Bronze	Total
1	Turkey	8	0	0	8
2	Italy	5	2	3	10
3	Egypt	3	10	1	14
4	Lebanon	0	3	7	10
5	Greece	0	1	1	2
6	Syria	0	0	4	4
Totals (6 entries)		16	16	16	48

== Medalists ==
=== Men's freestyle ===
Event	Gold	Silver	Bronze
52 kg	Hasan Gemici; Turkey	Mohamed Abdel Hamid; Egypt	Mohamed Dib El Sass; Syria
57 kg	Cemil Sarıbacak; Turkey	Saad Hafez; Egypt	Sotirios Panagiotopoulos; Greece
62 kg	Bayram Şit; Turkey	Abdel Essawi; Egypt	Elie Naasan; Lebanon
67 kg	Tevfik Yüce; Turkey	Garibaldo Nizzola; Italy	Asad Eid; Lebanon
73 kg	Bekir Büke; Turkey	Mohamed Badr; Egypt	Albino Vidali; Italy
79 kg	İsmet Atlı; Turkey	Abdou Hassan; Egypt	Michel Eid; Lebanon
87 kg	Bektaş Can; Turkey	Michel Skaff; Lebanon	Abdullah; Egypt
+87 kg	Kemal Dişiçürük; Turkey	Mohamed Ragab; Egypt	Natale Vecchi; Italy

=== Men's Greco-Roman ===
Event	Gold	Silver	Bronze
52 kg	Ignazio Fabra; Italy	Essawi; Egypt	Mohamed Dib El Sass; Syria
57 kg	Mahmoud Hassan; Egypt	Giovanni Cocco; Italy	Zakaria Chihab; Lebanon
62 kg	Antonio Randi; Italy	El-Sayed Mohamed Kandil; Egypt	Ibrahim Bayonne; Lebanon
67 kg	Kamal Bilaba; Egypt	Ibrahim Damaj; Lebanon	Umberto Trippa; Italy
73 kg	Adel Ibrahim Moustafa; Egypt	Khalil Taha; Lebanon	Mohamed El-Oulabi; Syria
79 kg	Antonio Cerroni; Italy	Mohamed Hassan Moussa; Egypt	Asad Eid; Lebanon
87 kg	Umberto Silvestri; Italy	Ibrahim Orabi; Egypt	Michel Skaff; Lebanon
+87 kg	Guido Fantoni; Italy	Antonios Georgoulis; Greece	Bagdadi; Syria
