= Antonio Siddi =

Italian athletics competitor

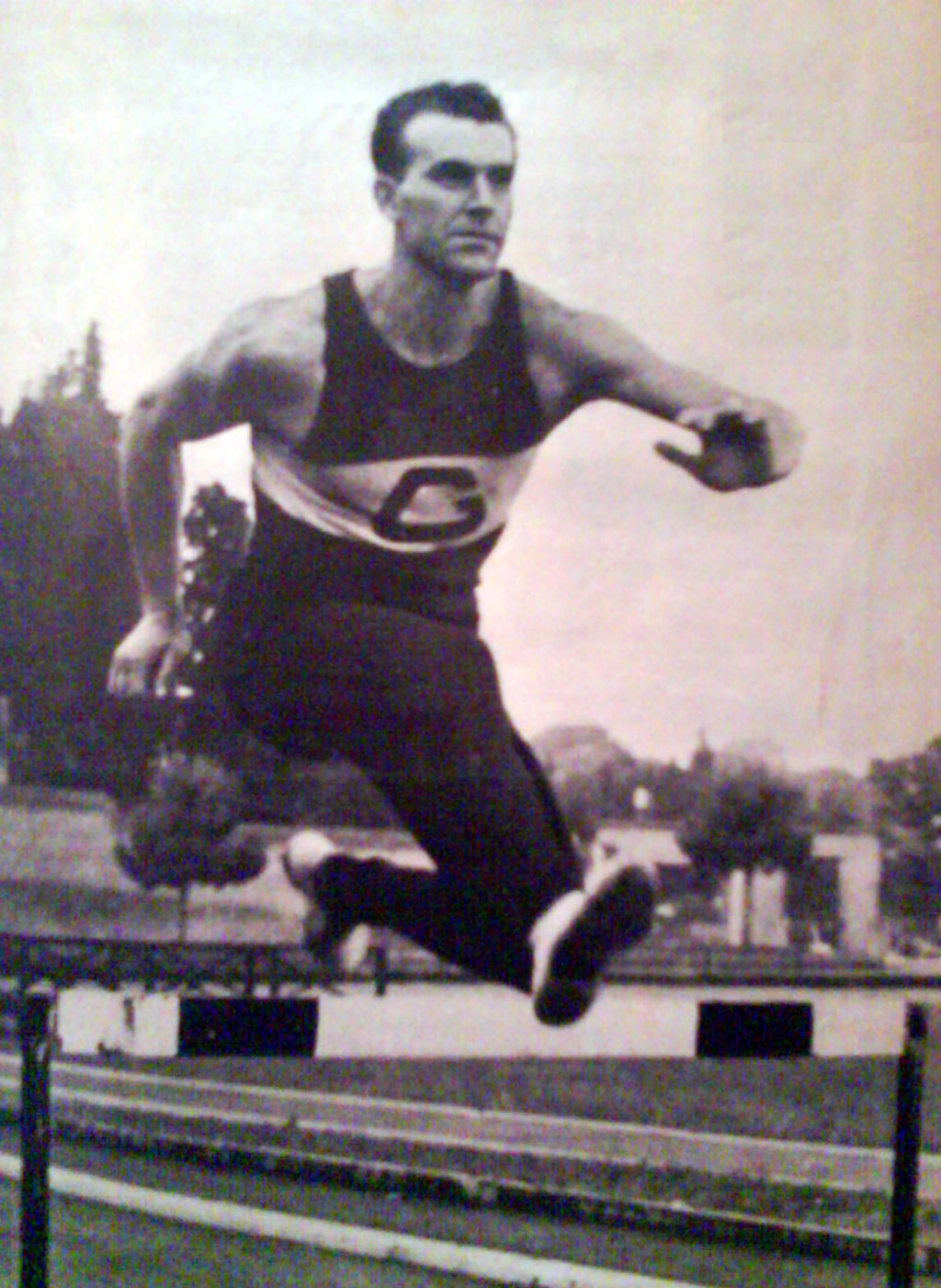
- Antonio Siddi in 1950.

Personal information
- Nationality: Italian
- Born: 16 June 1923 Sassari, Italy
- Died: 21 January 1983 (aged 59) Sassari, Italy
- Height: 1.77 m (5 ft 9 1/2 in)
- Weight: 63 kg (139 lb)

Sport
- Country: Italy
- Sport: Athletics
- Event: Sprint
- Club: CSI Brescia

Achievements and titles
- Personal best: 100 m: 10.5 (1949)
Medal record
Men's athletics
Representing Italy
Olympic Games
Bronze medal – third place	1948 London	4x100 m
European Championships
Silver medal – second place	1950 Brussels	4×400 m
Mediterranean Games
Gold medal – first place	1951 Alexandria	200 metres
Gold medal – first place	1951 Alexandria	4x100 m
Silver medal – second place	1951 Alexandria	400 metres

Antonio Siddi (16 June 1923 – 21 January 1983) was an Italian athlete, who mainly competed in the 100 metres. He also competed in the long jump.

== Biography ==
He was born in Sassari and competed for Italy at the 1948 Summer Olympics held in London, Great Britain, where he won the bronze medal with his teammates Michele Tito, Enrico Perucconi and Carlo Monti in the men's 4 x 100 metre relay event.

== Achievements ==
Year	Competition	Venue	Position	Event	Performance	Notes
1948	Olympic Games	(United Kingdom) London	3rd	4×100 metres relay	41.5	
1951	Mediterranean Games	(Egypt) Alexandria	1st	4×100 metres relay	42.4	

== See also ==
- Italy national relay team
