= Mauro Frizzoni =

Italian sprinter (1926–2004)

Personal information
- Nationality: Italian
- Born: 17 December 1926 Turin, Italy
- Died: 24 October 2004 (aged 77) Turin, Italy

Sport
- Country: Italy
- Sport: Athletics
- Event: Sprint
Medal record
Mediterranean Games
Gold medal – first place	1951 Alexandria	4×100 metres relay
Silver medal – second place	1951 Alexandria	100 metres

Mauro Frizzoni (17 December 1926 – 24 December 2004) was an Italian sprinter.

== Biography ==
He won two medals at the International athletics competitions, he has 1 cap in national team in 1951.

== Achievements ==
Year	Competition	Venue	Position	Event	Time	Notes
1951	Mediterranean Games	(Egypt) Alexandria	1st	4×100 metres relay	42.4	
1951	Mediterranean Games	(Egypt) Alexandria	2nd	100 metres	11.2	

== See also ==
- Italy national relay team
- Italy at the 1951 Mediterranean Games
