= Petar Šegedin (athlete) =

Yugoslav athlete

Personal information
- Nationality: Yugoslav/Croatian
- Born: 14 September 1926 Orebić, Kingdom of Serbs, Croats, and Slovenes
- Died: 14 October 1994 (aged 68) Dubrovnik, Croatia
- Height: 166 cm (5 ft 5 in)
- Weight: 54 kg (119 lb)

Sport
- Sport: Athletics
- Event: steeplechase
- Club: Partizan Belgrade
Medal record
Men's athletics
Representing Yugoslavia
European Championships
Gold medal – first place	1950 Brussels	3000 m st.
Mediterranean Games
Silver medal – second place	1951 Alexandria	3000 m st.

Petar Šegedin (14 September 1926 – 14 October 1994) was a Yugoslav/Croatian steeplechase and long-distance runner.

== Biography ==
Šegedin was a member of AK Jug, Dubrovnik and AK Partizan, Belgrade. He competed at the 1948 Summer Olympics in London, placing 6th. He also competed at the 1952 Summer Olympics.

Šegedin won the 3000 m steeplechase silver medal at the 1950 European Athletics Championships. His personal best over 3000 metres steeplechase was 8:47.8, set in 1953. He twice won the Yugoslavian Athletics Championships over 5000 m (1948 and 1950) and set five national records in this event.

Šegedin won the British AAA Championships title in the steeplechase event at the 1950 AAA Championships and the 1951 AAA Championships.

Awards
Preceded by First award	Yugoslav Sportsman of the Year; 1950	Succeeded by Andrija Otenheimer
