= Egypt at the 1951 Mediterranean Games =

- IOC code: EGY
- NOC: Egyptian Olympic Committee

in Alexandria, Egypt
- Competitors: 243 in 13 sports
- Medals Ranked 3rd: Gold 20 Silver 26 Bronze 19 Total 65

Mediterranean Games appearances (overview)
- 1951; 1955; 1959–1967; 1971; 1975; 1979; 1983; 1987; 1991; 1993; 1997; 2001; 2005; 2009; 2013; 2018; 2022

Other related appearances
- United Arab Republic (1959, 1963)

Egypt competed at the 1951 Mediterranean Games in Alexandria, Egypt.

== Medals by sport ==
Sport	Gold	Silver	Bronze	Total
Weightlifting	6	1	0	7
Boxing	4	5	1	10
Wrestling	3	10	1	14
Shooting	2	4	2	8
Rowing	1	2	1	4
Gymnastics	1	1	6	8
Diving	1	1	2	4
Basketball	1	0	0	1
Fencing	0	1	2	3
Football	0	1	0	1
Water polo	0	1	0	1
Athletics	0	0	4	4
Swimming	0	0	1	1
Totals (13 entries)	19	27	20	66
