= Jan Zwaan =

Dutch sprinter and hurdler

Personal information
- Born: 25 August 1925 Amsterdam, the Netherlands
- Died: 21 September 2007 (aged 82) Santa Cruz de Tenerife, Spain

Sport
- Sport: Hurdles
- Club: AAC, Amsterdam

Jan Marcus Zwaan (25 August 1925 – 21 September 2007) was a Dutch sprinter. He competed at the 1948 Summer Olympics in the 110 m hurdles events, but failed to reach the finals.

His brother Jo was also an Olympic sprinter; he took part in the 100 m and 4 × 100 m events at the 1948 Games.
