= Jack Gregory (sprinter) =

British sprinter

Personal information
- Nationality: British (English)
- Born: 2 June 1923 Sea Mills, Bristol, England
- Died: 15 December 2003 (aged 80) Bristol, England

Sport
- Sport: Athletics
- Event: Sprints
- Club: Crusaders AC, Dublin; Bristol AC
Medal record
Representing Great Britain
Athletics
Silver medal – second place	1948 London	4x100 metre relay

John Arthur Gregory (22 June 1923 – 15 December 2003) was a British athlete who competed mainly in the 100 metres and participated at the 1948 Summer Olympics and 1952 Summer Olympics.

== Biography ==
During World War II Gregory was a sergeant instructor with the Depot and Training Establishment of the Royal Army Medical Corps at Aldershot. He played rugby in the position of a wing three-quarter and appeared for the Army and Combined Services.

Gregory finished third behind McDonald Bailey in the 100 yards event at the 1947 AAA Championships.

Gregory represented the Great Britain team at the 1948 Olympic Games in London in the 4 x 100 metre relay, where he won the silver medal with his teammates Jack Archer, Alastair McCorquodale and Kenneth Jones.

Gregory appeared at a second Olympic Games four years later, representing the Great Britain team at the 1952 Olympic Games in Helsinki, once again in the 4 x 100 metres relay.

Gregory was also a top class rugby player. Although he spent most his career playing for Bristol Rugby, he also played rugby league for Huddersfield and was banned by the RFU. He was reinstated in April 1948 and in January 1949 played his only game for England at rugby union in their defeat to Wales. His club side when capped for England was Blackheath. In November 1953, he captained the Western Counties against the touring All Blacks.
