= Miloš Raović =

Serbian sprinter

Personal information
- Nationality: Serbian
- Born: May 12, 1994 (age 32) Priboj, Yugoslavia

Sport
- Sport: Track
- Event: 400 meters
- Club: AK Partizan

Achievements and titles
- Personal best(s): 200 metres: 21.44; 400 meters: 45.96
- Updated on 2-14-15

Miloš Raović (born 12 May 1994) is a Serbian sprinter who specializes in the 400 meters. He participated for Serbia at the 2014 European Athletics Championships.

== Running career ==
Raović established himself as an international level sprinter after training with AK Partizan.

Originally Raović started out as a hurdler but made a transition to sprinting. He made his international debut at the 2011 World Youth Championships in Athletics in the boy's 400 meters, where he ran under the 50 second barrier. He then appeared at the 2012 World Junior Championships in Athletics, where he also ran the 400. His last major international race as a junior was the 400 at the 2013 European Athletics Junior Championships. He placed third overall in the Second League men's 400 meters of the 2013 European Team Championships. In the same competition (also in the Second League) at the following year he placed second overall in the 400 meters.
