= Konstantinos Giataganas =

Greek athlete (1920–1997)

Medal record

Men's athletics

Representing Greece

Mediterranean Games
Gold medal – first place	1951	Shot Put
Bronze medal – third place	1951	Discus
Bronze medal – third place	1955	Discus

Konstantinos Giataganas or Konstantinos Yataganas (12 October 1920 – February 1997) was a Greek shot putter and discus thrower who competed in the 1948 Summer Olympics and in the 1952 Summer Olympics. and won the gold medal in Shot Put at the 1951 Mediterranean Games. and two bronze medals in Discus first at the 1951 Mediterranean Games and second at the 1955 Mediterranean Games.
