= Willy Kemp =

Luxembourgish cyclist (1925–2021)

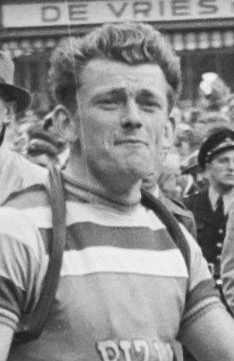

Personal information
- Full name: Willy Kemp
- Born: 28 December 1925 Kopstal, Luxembourg
- Died: 18 October 2021 (aged 95)

Cycling career
- Sport: Cycling
- Discipline: Road
- Role: Rider

Amateur team
- -1947: -

Professional team
- 1947-1957: -

Major wins
- 1 stage 1955 Tour de France
Medal record
Representing Luxembourg
Men's road cycling
World University Cycling Championships
Gold medal – first place	1947 Paris	Road Race
Silver medal – second place	1947 Paris	Individual pursuit
Silver medal – second place	1947 Paris	Team pursuit

Willy Kemp (28 December 1925 – 18 October 2021) was a Luxembourgish professional road bicycle racer.

Kemp came from a wealthy home and studied economics. After becoming an amateur 1947 World University Cycling Champion, his parents agreed that he should become a professional cyclist. In 1949 he became national champion. Between 1948 and 1957 he rode every year the Tour de France (10 times in total) and won a stage in the 1955 Tour de France.

He died on 18 October 2021, at the age of 95. Prior to his death, he was noted as Luxembourg's oldest living professional cyclist.

== Major results ==
1947
(gold) World University Cycling Champion, road race
(silver) World University Cycling Championships, individual pursuit
(silver) World University Cycling Championships, team pursuit
GP Faber
1949
Luxembourg national road race championships
1950
Stage 2 Tour de Luxembourg
1951
2nd Luxembourg national road race championships
1952
Stage 1 Ronde van Nederland
Stage 4a Tour de Luxembourg
2nd Overall: Euskal Bizikleta

1st Stage 1

1954
Stage 3 Tour de Picardie
1955
2nd Luxembourg national road race championships
3rd Overall, Tour de Picardie

1st Stage 2

Stage 4 Tour de France
1956
Stage 3 Tour de Luxembourg
1957
3rd Luxembourg national road race championships
