= Raşit Öztaş =

Turkish sprinter (born 1920)

Raşit Öztaş (1920 – before 2013) was a Turkish athlete who competed in the men's 100 metres in the 1948 Summer Olympics.

== Biography ==
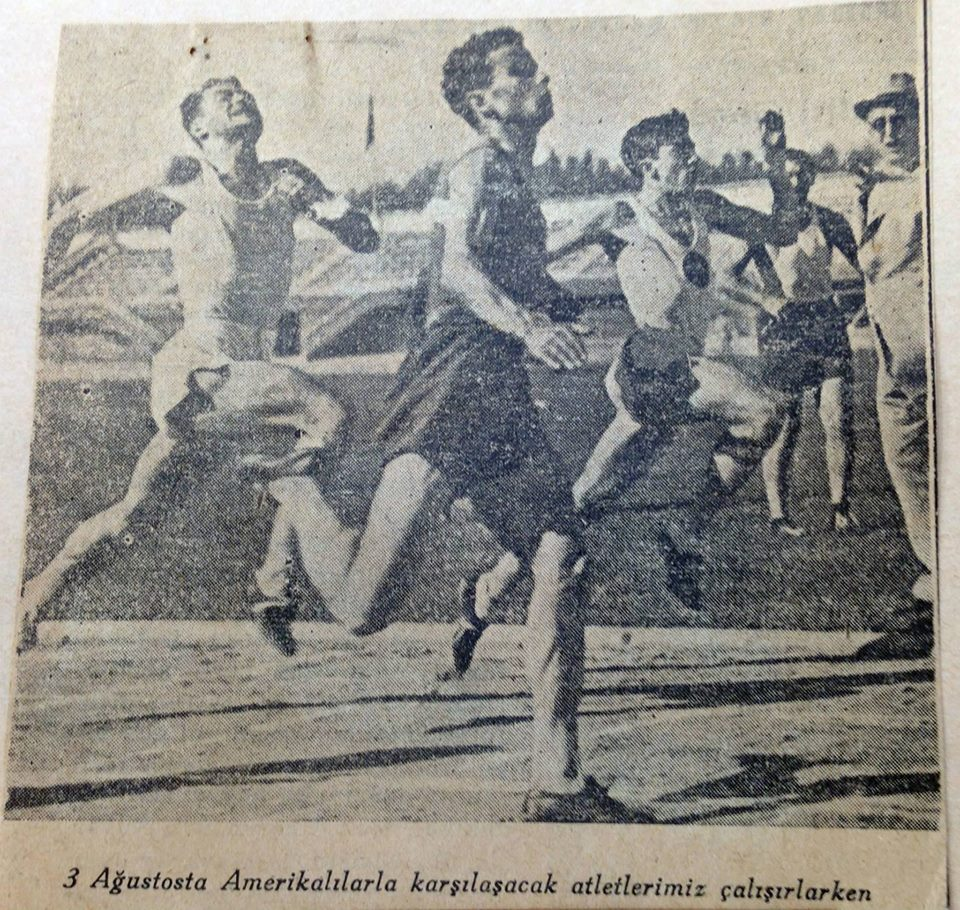
Raşit Öztaş Yarişiyor

Raşit Öztaş was born in Nevşehir in 1920. His father Mahmut was a carpet and peanut merchant. Mahmut and his wife Atiye (daughter of Hüseyin Hüsnü Pasha) had emigrated to Turkey from Libya shortly after they married. The family settled in Adana and had three children. Mahmut died when Raşit was young and his mother died shortly thereafter.

He lived with his uncle for a time and then with a family friend. He finished primary school and started secondary school in Adana, then completed his high school education in Eskiseheir where his brother lived. He had always been interested in sport and became a runner in high school. He began to travel to tournaments with the Turkish athletic team. While in high school, he won the Turkish championships several times and also won the Eastern Mediterranean Athletics Championship once.

Öztaş then obtained a degree from the Faculty of Foreign Trade and Consular Business of the Izmir University Economy and Trade Sciences department. Whilst studying at University, Raşit continued with his sports career and training without rest and in his last year at university in 1948 he won the Turkish championship and qualified to represent Turkey at the London Olympics in the 100x200m. He was third in his heat in the 1948 London Olympics.

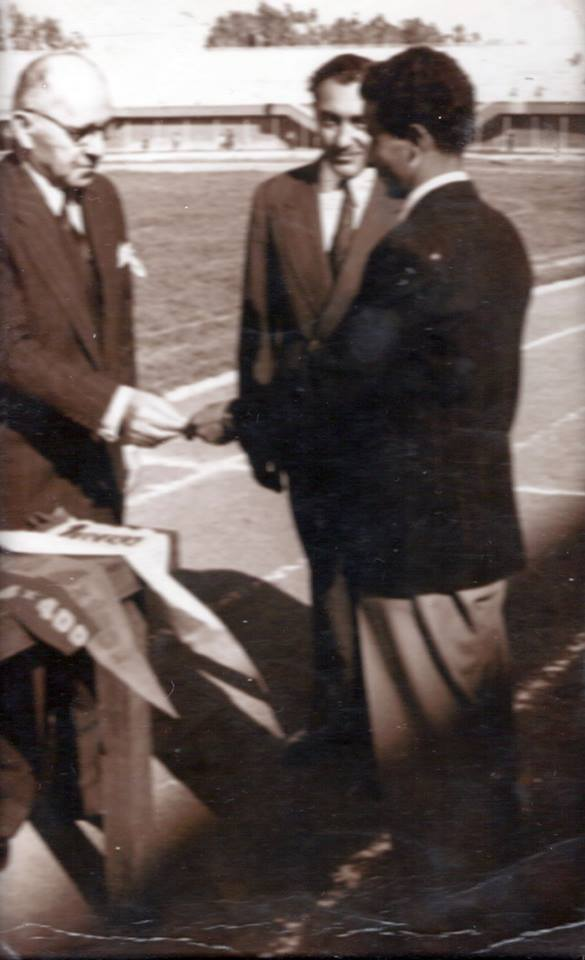
Raşit Öztaş Medalya Aliyor

After representing Turkey in the London Olympics in 1948, he returned to Ankara to do his reserve officer military duty. Before he started his military duty, his commanders asked him to stay in the military to train successful sports people like himself, but he preferred to go to Gaziler Tepesi where he was appointed as a reserve officer and to do his national duty there.

After he completed his national duty as a reserve officer, Raşit Öztaş was appointed to a sugar factory as a manager.

When he was in his fourth year of university, Raşit Öztaş married Azize Oztas who was a student at Eskisehir-Mahmudiye-Cifteler Village Institute teachers training school. They had three children, Atilla, Gulden and Ulku, and later three grandchildren. Öztaş died prior to 2013.
