= Franjo Mihalić =

Yugoslav long-distance runner

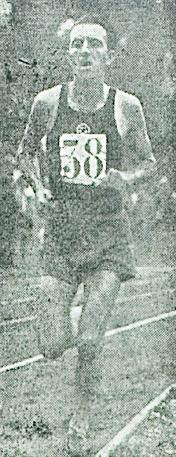

Personal information
- Nickname: Jura
- Nationality: Croatian
- Born: 9 March 1920 Ludina, Kingdom of Serbs, Croats, and Slovenes
- Died: 14 February 2015 (aged 94) Belgrade, Serbia
- Height: 1.75 m (5 ft 9 in)
- Weight: 58 kg (128 lb)

Sport
- Country: Independent State of Croatia (1941–1945); Yugoslavia (after 1945)
- Sport: Track, Long-distance running
- Events: 10,000 m, cross country, marathon, road running
- Club: AK Partizan (since 1947)
- Retired: 1966

Achievements and titles
- Personal bests: 5000 metres: 14:18.0; 10,000 metres: 29:37.6; Marathon: 2:21:24
Medal record
Representing Yugoslavia
Men's athletics
Olympic Games
Silver medal – second place	1956 Melbourne	Marathon
International Cross Country Championships
Gold medal – first place	1953 Paris	Individual
Bronze medal – third place	1953 Paris	Team
Mediterranean Games
Silver medal – second place	1951 Alexandria	10,000 m

Franjo Mihalić (Serbo-Croatian pronunciation: [frǎːɲo mǐxalitɕ]; 9 March 1920 – 14 February 2015) was a Yugoslav and Croatian long-distance runner best known for his 1958 win at the Boston Marathon and his marathon silver medal in the 1956 Summer Olympics. Mihalić competed mostly in marathons, road races and cross country races, distinguishing himself by winning many top-level international competitions in the 1950s and setting a combined 25 Croatian and later Yugoslavian national records in long-distance track events between 5000 m and 25 km. In 1957, he became the inaugural winner of the Golden Badge, the award for the best sportsperson of Yugoslavia awarded by the daily Sport. He is regarded as the most accomplished male athlete in the history of Croatian, Serbian and Yugoslav track and field.

== Biography ==
=== Early life ===
Mihalić was born in 1920 in the village of Ludina (part of Kutina), in what is today Sisak-Moslavina County, Croatia. His father Josip was a tailor, while his mother Veronika was a housewife. Mihalić was born the tenth of their twelve children. When he was three years old, the family moved to Zagreb.

Mihalić started playing sports at age 10. In 1936, while playing football for the local club NK Grafičar, Mihalić met Stjepan Bobek, three years his junior. At the time, Bobek played for NK Ličanin, Grafičar's main rivals. This was the beginning of a lifelong friendship, as both Mihalić and Bobek (who would become the all-time top scorer for the Yugoslavia national team) were transferred to Belgrade after World War II as Yugoslav star athletes.

Mihalić started working at age 16 as a printing house apprentice. With his first wages he bought a bicycle, joined the Olimpic cycling club, and then spent the next four years racing for them. He was fairly successful, being able to score top ten finishes competing against the best Croatian cyclists of the era. However, his enthusiasm for the sport was dampened by a number of major crashes he suffered in training and racing which resulted in injuries and permanent scarring.

=== Entry into athletics ===
Mihalić's entry into athletics was almost coincidental. In 1940, one of the events of the Workers' Sports Games in Zagreb was a cross country race. Mihalić was nominated for the race by his football club Grafičar as he was their fastest player. Despite the fact that he entered the first foot race in his life without any training, he placed second out of approximately 200 participants, narrowly losing to an experienced athlete. This event was crucial in his decision to leave cycling and take up athletics. He joined the Concordia Zagreb athletics club and after only several months of training set his first national record in the 5000 meters, followed shortly by a national record in the 10,000 meters.

During World War II Mihalić represented the Independent State of Croatia. He won several international competitions, set five national records and was named Croatian Sportsman of the Year three times. Mihalić used his top athlete status to avoid being drafted and declined membership in the Ustasha party by saying he was "apolitical". His first athletics coach Milčo Dobrin, who as a Jew had to wear a Star of David was barred from attending competitions. Later Dobrin managed to escape to Venezuela through Switzerland.

Following WWII Mihalić ran for the newly formed Mladost athletics club from 1945 to 1947, of which he was a co-founder. In 1947 he was transferred to Belgrade by the new communist Yugoslav authorities to join the Partizan sports association. Mihalić got a well-paid job and good conditions for training with his new club, so he decided to settle permanently in Belgrade, where he soon married and became a father.

=== International success ===
One of Mihalić's early international successes came at the 1951 Mediterranean Games in Alexandria, where he won the 10,000 m silver medal, behind Alain Mimoun. Mihalić also competed in the 10,000 m event at the 1952 Summer Olympics in Helsinki, finishing 18th.

The first major success came the following year in Paris, when Mihalić became the world cross country champion, winning the International Cross Country Championships, a precursor of today's IAAF World Cross Country Championships.

Mihalić left his mark on the Saint Silvester Road Race in São Paulo, Brazil, where he won twice (1952 and 1954), once placed third (1951) and once second (1953, losing to Emil Zátopek). He won the prestigious Cinque Mulini cross country race in Italy three times (1957, 1958 and 1961).

Apart from his later victory in Boston, Mihalić scored wins in international marathons in Athens and Moscow (both in 1957).

==== 1956 Summer Olympics ====
Mihalić won the marathon silver medal at the 1956 Summer Olympics in Melbourne. This was, in his view, the greatest achievement of his sports career. No Yugoslav track and field athlete has managed to win an Olympic medal since.

Mihalić came to Melbourne in good running shape; by his account, he had been training more than ever. Alain Mimoun of France and Veikko Karvonen of Finland were considered the pre-race favorites. Some have also seen Mihalić as one of the favorites, as he enhanced his reputation earlier in the year by winning the Balkan Games marathon in Belgrade in a then-spectacular time of 2:16:25, which would have been the fastest marathon race ever if the course had not been found too short. Mihalić himself judged that, in a field of 46 Olympic marathon entrants, 15 were better than him, but nevertheless he felt that he had a fighting chance for winning a medal.

The Olympic marathon was held in the afternoon of a very hot day, and the course provided little or no shade, except for the start and finish. Mihalić kept with the leading group, gradually advancing in the standings, but had a serious setback while approaching the first water station at the 15th kilometer. In a scramble for refreshment he tripped, collided with the water table and fell to the ground, injuring himself. Despite bruising his arms and legs he managed to get up and continue the race but only reconnected with the head of the pack at the 20th kilometer. Shortly after that, Mimoun suddenly broke away from the leading group. Mihalić decided against chasing him until the 35th kilometer, when he realized none of the other runners were able to follow. By that time however Mimoun had an advantage of more than a minute, and Mihalić was unable to catch up with him. In the end, he was the second to cross the finish line in a time of 2:26:32, a minute and a half after Mimoun, and a minute in front of the bronze medalist Veikko Karvonen.

==== 1958 Boston Marathon ====
Another highlight of Mihalić's career came in the 1958 Boston Marathon race, held on an unusually warm day. He scored a decisive victory over the field, besting the defending champion John J. Kelley who took second place by nearly five minutes, and leaving the third-placed Einno Pulkkinen more than 11 minutes behind. Mihalić's winning time of 2:25:54 was five minutes short of Kelley's course record established in the previous year, but was still impressive given the hot weather in which the race was held. The "heat-loving Yugoslav's" successes in hot conditions were attributed to his unusual habit of training in the middle of the day, between noon and 2 pm.

Mihalić's 1958 Boston Marathon win was the first – and, as of 2015, the only – by a male athlete from the former communist state.

=== Later career and retirement ===
Mihalić participated in the marathon at the 1960 Summer Olympics in Rome, finishing 12th, in a time of 2:21:52.6. His third and final Cinque Mulini win in 1961, shortly before his 41st birthday, was also his last major international result. Mihalić retired from sport in 1966 by winning his last race, the Kadinjača mini-marathon in Užice.

In his active career, Mihalić won 14 national championships (12 over 10,000 m and 2 over 5000 m), but never won a national marathon championship.

As of December 2009, three of Mihalić's track records still survive as Serbian national records: 20,000 m (1952), one hour run (1952) and 25,000 m (1957).

=== Veteran career ===
Mihalić participated in 10 km runs until his late 70s. He had to quit running on doctor's orders in the early 2000s when he severely injured his knee in the Cer-Šabac race. He then promptly switched to racewalking and won three gold medals in the 5 km event for Serbia and Montenegro at the veteran Balkan Games, the last one in 2005.

In late 2006, Mimoun, Mihalić and Karvonen, the three marathon medalists in the 1956 Olympics, met in Paris in a reunion organized by the French sports daily L'Équipe on the 50th anniversary of the Olympic marathon in Melbourne.

In his late 80s Mihalić still walked 3 kilometers every day from his Belgrade home to the Partizan Stadium, where he volunteered as an athletics coach. He participated in the 2009 Summer Universiade in Belgrade as an athletic referee. He died on 14 February 2015 at the age of 94.

== Quotes ==
I regret a bit for having been born too early. When I won the world's oldest marathon, in Boston in 1958, all I got was a gold medal. Today the winner gets one hundred thousand dollars and an automobile! If I'd win it two times – that would be enough. Yes, I regret a bit for not being 25 today.

— Glas javnosti interview in December 2000, Franjo Mihalić

== See also ==
- List of winners of the Boston Marathon

Awards
Preceded by Andrija Otenheimer; Bernard Vukas	Yugoslav Sportsman of the Year; 1952; 1956, 1957	Succeeded by Perica Vlašić; Stanko Lorger
Preceded by None	(Socialist Federal Republic of Yugoslavia) The Best Athlete of Yugoslavia; 1957	Succeeded by Svetozar Gligorić
