= Mihajlo Dimitrijević =

Serbian high jumper

Olympic medal record

Representing Yugoslavia

Men's athletics

Mediterranean Games
Bronze medal – third place	1951 Alexandria	High Jump

Mihajlo Dimitrijević (27 May 1927 – 2 November 1995) was a Serbian high jumper who competed for SFR Yugoslavia in the 1952 Summer Olympics.

He was a member of AK Partizan Belgrade.
