= Emin Doybak =

Turkish sprinter

Personal information
- Nationality: Turkish
- Born: 1930
- Died: 13 November 2009 (aged 78–79)

Sport
- Sport: Sprinting
- Event: 400 metres

Emin Doybak (1930 – 13 November 2009) was a Turkish sprinter. He competed in the men's 400 metres at the 1952 Summer Olympics.
