= Vassilios Sillis =

Greek sprinter

Vassilios Sillis (Greek: Βασίλειος Σίλλης; 9 March 1929 – 5 January 2018) was a Greek athlete and a record holder over 400m in Greece. He was born in Athens.

As a sprinter he competed in the 1952 Summer Olympics and in the 1960 Summer Olympics. He was named the 1954 and 1962 Greek Athlete of the Year. In 2012, he returned his first Greek Athlete of the Year award, which he won in 1954 to the PSAT (Panhellenic Sports Press Association). He stated that he returned the award because he wanted "to return a historical token of an institution that entails the great honour, for any athlete who can be awarded by the Sports Press".
