= Jan Meijer =

Dutch sprinter

Personal information
- Born: 8 June 1921 Amsterdam, the Netherlands
- Died: 21 October 1993 (aged 72) Amsterdam, the Netherlands

Sport
- Sport: Sprint
- Club: Blauw-Wit, Amsterdam

Johannes Michaël "Jan" Meijer (8 June 1921 – 21 October 1993) was a Dutch sprinter. He competed at the 1948 Summer Olympics in the 100 m and 4 × 100 m events and finished in sixth place in the relay.

== Competition record ==
| Year | Competition | Venue | Position | Event | Notes |
Representing Netherlands
| 1948 | Olympics | London, England | 3rd, Heat 4 | 100 m | 11.0 |
