= Branko Dangubić =

Yugoslav javelin thrower

Personal information
- Nationality: Yugoslav
- Born: 13 July 1922 Ljubinje, Kingdom of Serbs, Croats and Slovenes (present-day Bosnia and Herzegovina)
- Died: 24 November 2002 (aged 80) Belgrade, Serbia
- Height: 183 cm (6 ft 0 in)
- Weight: 85 kg (187 lb)

Sport
- Sport: Athletics
- Event: javelin throw
- Club: Crvena zvezda
Medal record
Representing Yugoslavia
Men's athletics
Mediterranean Games
Gold medal – first place	1951 Alexandria	Javelin throw

Branko Dangubić (13 July 1922– 24 November 2002) was a Serbian javelin thrower who competed in the 1952 Summer Olympics.

== Biography ==
Dangubić won a gold medal at the 1951 Mediterranean Games in the men's javelin throw. He represented Yugoslavia at the 1952 Olympic Games in Helsinki, finishing fifth.

Dangubić finished second behind Michael Denley in the javelin throw event at the British 1953 AAA Championships.
