= Trausti Eyjólfsson =

Icelandic sprinter (1927–2010)

Personal information
- Nationality: Icelandic
- Born: Jón Trausti Eyjólfsson; 22 November 1927
- Died: 20 July 2010 (aged 82)

Sport
- Sport: Sprinting
- Event: 4 × 100 metres relay
- Club: KR

Trausti Eyjólfsson (22 November 1927 – 20 July 2010) was an Icelandic sprinter. He competed in the men's 4 × 100 metres relay at the 1948 Summer Olympics.
