= Victor Sillon =

French pole vaulter (1927–2021)

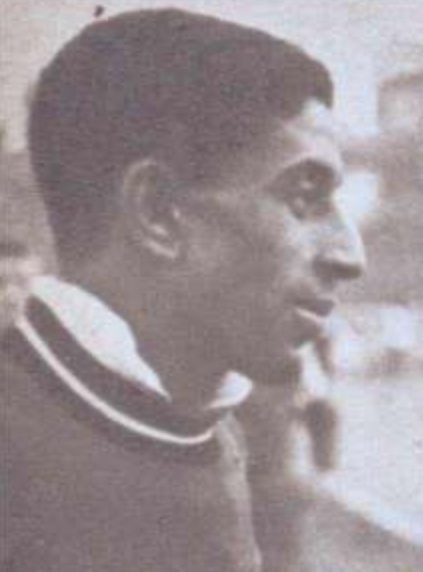
- Born: 24 December 1927; Lamentin, Martinique
- Died: 14 December 2021 (aged 93)
- Occupation: Pole vaulter

Victor Sillon (24 December 1927 – 14 December 2021) was a French athlete who specialised in pole vault. Sillon competed in the Men's pole vault at the 1948 Summer Olympics, 1956 Summer Olympics, and 1960 Summer Olympics. He was born in Lamentin, Martinique, France. He died on 14 December 2021.
