= Nikolay Karakulov =

Soviet sprinter

Personal information
- Born: 10 August 1918
- Died: 10 March 1988 (aged 69)

Sport
- Sport: Athletics
- Event: Sprint

Achievements and titles
- Personal bests: 100 m – 10.4 (1948); 200 m – 21.6 (1946)
Medal record
Men's athletics
Representing Soviet Union
European Championships
| Gold medal – first place | 1946 Oslo | 200 m |
| Gold medal – first place | 1950 Brussels | 4×100 m |

Nikolay Zakharovich Karakulov (Russian: Николай Захарович Каракулов; 10 August 1918 – 10 March 1988) was a Soviet sprinter who won gold medals at the 1946 and 1950 European championships. Domestically he won 17 Soviet titles, including seven consecutive titles over 100 m from 1943 to 1949.

In 1957 he was awarded the Order of the Red Banner of Labour.
