= Marc Litaudon =

French sprinter

Personal information
- Nationality: French
- Born: 30 June 1926 Landau, Germany
- Died: 27 September 2003 (aged 77) Paris, France

Sport
- Sport: Sprinting
- Event: 4 × 100 metres relay

Marc Francois Marie Litaudon (30 June 1926 – 27 September 2003) was a French sprinter. He competed in the men's 4 × 100 metres relay at the 1948 Summer Olympics.
