= Enrico Perucconi =

Italian athlete (1925–2020)

Personal information
- Nationality: Italian
- Born: 4 January 1925 Morazzone, Italy
- Died: 14 July 2020 (aged 95) Morazzone, Italy

Sport
- Country: Italy
- Sport: Athletics
- Event: Sprint
- Club: Pro Patria Milano

Achievements and titles
- Personal best: 100 m: 10.6 (1947)
Medal record
Bronze medal – third place	1948 London	4x100 metre relay

Enrico Perucconi (4 January 1925 – 14 July 2020) was an Italian athlete who competed mainly in the 100 metres. He was born in Morazzone, Varese, Italy.

== Biography ==
He competed for Italy in the 1948 Summer Olympics held in London, Great Britain in the 4 x 100 metre relay where he won the bronze medal with his teammates Michele Tito, Antonio Siddi and Carlo Monti.

== Olympic results ==
Year	Competition	Venue	Position	Event	Performance	Notes
1948	Olympic Games	(United Kingdom) London	3rd	4×100 metres relay	41.5	

== See also ==
- Italy national relay team
