= Stefanos Petrakis =

Greek sprinter (1924–2022)

Stefanos Petrakis (Greek: Στέφανος Πετράκης; 17 December 1924 – 8 May 2022) was a Greek sprinter.

Born in Athens, Greece, he competed in the 1948 Summer Olympics and in the 1952 Summer Olympics. He was also the 100 metres champion for Greece at the 1951 Mediterranean Games. At the 1955 Mediterranean Games he was eliminated in the 100 metres semi-final.

Petrakis died on 8 May 2022, at the age of 97.
