= Tilly Decker =

Luxembourgish sprinter

Personal information
- Nationality: Luxembourgish
- Born: Mathilde Decker; 10 January 1930 Esch-sur-Alzette, Luxembourg

Sport
- Sport: Sprinting
- Event: 100 metres

Tilly Decker (born 10 January 1930) is a Luxembourgish sprinter. She competed in the women's 100 metres at the 1948 Summer Olympics.
