= Haakon Tranberg =

Norwegian sprinter (1917–1991)

Medal record

Men's athletics

Representing Norway

European Championships
Silver medal – second place	1946 Oslo	100 m
Silver medal – second place	1946 Oslo	200 m

Haakon Werner Tranberg (2 March 1917 – 24 April 1991) was a Norwegian sprinter who specialized in the 100 and 200 metres. He represented Kristiansands IF.

He won silver medals in 100 m and 200 m at the 1946 European Championships. He never participated in the Summer Olympics. He became Norwegian champion in 100 m in 1939, 1946 and 1947, in 200 m in 1939 and 1946 and in long jump in 1946 and 1947. His career was interrupted by World War II in Norway 1940–1945. He was imprisoned in Arkivet from 14 November 1944 and then in Grini concentration camp from 5 December 1944 to the war's end in May 1945.

His career best time in 100 m was 10.4 seconds, achieved in September 1939 at Bislett stadion. A month earlier, on the same track, he had clocked a career best time in 200 m of 21.5 seconds. A year later, again at the same stadium, he achieved a career best in long jump with 7.26 metres.
