= Erdal Barkay =

Turkish hurdler and sprinter

Personal information
- Nationality: Turkish
- Born: 14 March 1928
- Died: 3 October 2005 (aged 77)

Sport
- Sport: Hurdling
- Event: 110 m hurdles

Erdal Barkay (14 March 1928 – 3 October 2005) was a Turkish hurdler and sprinter. He competed in the men's 110 metres hurdles at the Summer Olympics in 1948 and 1952, and in the men's 4 × 100 metres relay at the 1948 Summer Olympics.
