= William Fahmy Hanna =

Egyptian middle-distance runner

Personal information
- Nationality: Egyptian
- Born: 18 March 1928

Sport
- Sport: Middle-distance running
- Event: 1500 metres

William Fahmy Hanna (born 18 March 1928) is an Egyptian former middle-distance runner. He competed in the men's 1500 metres at the 1952 Summer Olympics.
