= Albano Albanese =

Italian hurdler and high jumper (1921–2010)

Personal information
- Born: 20 December 1921 Parenzo, Kingdom of Italy (now in Croatia)
- Died: 5 December 2010 (aged 88)

Sport
- Country: Italy
- Sport: Athletics
- Events: Hurdling, High jump
Medal record
International University Games
Gold medal – first place	1947 Paris	110 m hurdles

Albano Albanese (20 December 1921 – 5 December 2010) was an Italian hurdler and high jumper.
