= Ahmet Aytar =

Turkish runner (1922–1992)

Ahmet Aytar (1922 – 1 May 1992) was a Turkish long-distance runner who competed in the 1952 Summer Olympics.
