= Akın Altıok =

Turkish triple jumper

Akın Altıok (born 13 July 1932) is a Turkish former triple jumper who competed in the 1952 Summer Olympics.
