= László Bartha (athlete, born 1925) =

Hungarian sprinter

Personal information
- Nationality: Hungarian
- Born: 19 March 1925
- Died: 4 July 1982 (aged 57)

Sport
- Sport: Sprinting
- Event: 100 metres

László Bartha (19 March 1925 – 4 July 1982) was a Hungarian sprinter. He competed in the men's 100 metres at the 1948 Summer Olympics.

== Competition record ==
Year	Competition	Venue	Position	Event	Notes
Representing Hungary
1948	Olympics	London, England	3rd, Heat 12	100 m	11.1
