= Theodosios Balafas =

Greek pole vaulter

Theodosios Balafas (27 August 1923 – 6 April 2015) was a Greek pole vaulter who competed in the 1948 Summer Olympics and in the 1952 Summer Olympics.
