= Halil Zıraman =

Turkish javelin thrower (1927–1984)

Halil İbrahim Zıraman
Personal information
- Nationality: Turkey
- Born: 1927 Zıraman village, Kula, Manisa Province, Turkey
- Died: 1984 (aged 56–57)
- Years active: 1947-1957

Sport
- Sport: Javelin throw
- Club: Fenerbahçe Athletics

Achievements and titles
- Personal best: 65.41 m NR (1949)
Medal record
Mediterranean Games
| Silver medal – second place | 1951 Alexandria | Javelin |

Halil İbrahim Zıraman (1927–1984) was a Turkish javelin thrower, who twice competed for his native country at the Summer Olympics in 1948 and 1952.

== Biography ==
Halil İbrahim Zıraman was born 1927 in Zıraman village of Kula district in Manisa Province. He finished the elementary school in his village, and the secondary school in Simav. He graduated from the Agricultural Machinery Vocational College in Ankara following his education at the Agriculture Vocational High School in Bornova, İzmir.

Zıraman began with javelin sport in 1947 at the high school in İzmir. Zıraman set his first national record on June 20, 1948, with 60.28 m. He improved his records four times, and set his personal best with 65.41 m on August 24, 1949.

He was also active in discus throwing and shot put events, retired in 1957. Zıraman was also a member of the Fenerbahçe Athletics team.

Zıraman died from heart failure in 1984.

== Achievements ==
| Year | Competition | Venue | Position | Notes |
|---|---|---|---|---|
| 1948 | Olympic Games | London, United Kingdom | 22nd | 53.30 m |
| 1949 | Mediterranean Games | Istanbul, Turkey | 1st | 61.31 m |
| 1951 | Mediterranean Games | Alexandria, Egypt | 2nd | 63.62 m |
| 1952 | Olympic Games | Helsinki, Finland | 21st | 61.19 m |
