= Zvonko Sabolović =

Yugoslav and Croatian sprinter

Personal information
- Nationality: Yugoslav
- Born: Zvonimir Sabolović; 23 June 1923 Križevci, Kingdom of Serbs, Croats and Slovenes
- Died: 5 May 2008 (aged 84) Belgrade, Serbia

Sport
- Sport: Sprinting
- Event: 400 metres

Zvonimir "Zvonko" Sabolović (23 June 1923 – 5 May 2008) was a Yugoslav and Croatian sprinter. He competed in the men's 400 metres at the 1948 Summer Olympics.
