= Jack Archer (sprinter) =

English sprinter (1921–1997)

Personal information
- Nationality: British (English)
- Born: 10 August 1921 Nottingham, England
- Died: 29 July 1997 (aged 75) Cheltenham, England

Sport
- Sport: Athletics
- Event: Sprints
- Club: Notts AC
Medal record
Men's athletics
Representing Great Britain
Olympic Games
Silver medal – second place	1948 London	4 × 100 m relay
European Athletics Championships
Gold medal – first place	1946 Oslo	100 m
Representing England
British Empire Games
Silver medal – second place	1950 Auckland	4 × 110 yd relay

John Archer (10 August 1921 – 29 July 1997) was an English athlete who competed mainly in the 100 metres and competed at the 1948 Summer Olympics.

== Biography ==
Archer was born in Nottingham, England and grew up at 24 North Gate in New Basford. He attended the High Pavement Grammar School. He would later return to the High Pavement school on Friday 19 November 1948 for a presentation from the Lord Mayor, for his Olympic success. He was a Wellington bomber pilot in World War II, becoming a Flt Lt and taught Physical Education at his old school. His county 100 metres record of 10.6 seconds lasted until August 1996, when Cori Henry ran 10.5 secs in Dudley.

Archer finished second behind McDonald Bailey in both the 100 and 220 yards events at the 1946 AAA Championships and the following month at the 1946 European Athletics Championships in Oslo, he won the European Athletics championships 100 metres with a consistent time of 10.6 seconds through the heats and in the final. He broke his leg playing rugby around late 1946.

Archer represented the Great Britain team at the 1948 Olympic Games in London, in the men's 4 × 100 metres relay, where he won the silver medal with his teammates John Gregory, Alastair McCorquodale and Ken Jones. The British team were initially awarded the gold medal after the USA team were disqualified for a faulty baton change but, two days later, following a review, they had to hand the gold medals back and were awarded the silver medal in a second ceremony.

Archer finished third behind McDonald Bailey in the 100 yards event at the 1949 AAA Championships and the following year represented England and won a silver medal in the 4 × 110 yd relay at the 1950 British Empire Games in Auckland, New Zealand.

Later that year after the 1950 British Empire Games, he was married by Canon J Lowndes at C of E St Leodegarius Church, Basford to Josephine Dorothy Hateley of 159 Park Road in Loughborough, a former art student of Loughborough College. He trained as a PE teacher at Loughborough College in 1950. He also played rugby for the Notts, Lincs and Derbys team. For many years he was the principal of St Paul's College of Education in Cheltenham, later the University of Gloucestershire.

His sister was Dorothy Cooke of Tring Vale in Sherwood. Josephine and John had son Paul, a teacher, and daughter Lorna, a doctor.

Archer died in Cheltenham, Gloucestershire in 1997.
