= Stevan Pavlović =

Serbian long-distance runner

Olympic medal record

Representing Yugoslavia

Men's athletics

Mediterranean Games
Bronze medal – third place	1951 Alexandria	5000m

Stevan Pavlović (16 May 1926 – 30 July 1998) was a Serbian long-distance runner who competed for SFR Yugoslavia in the 1952 Summer Olympics.

He was a member of AK Partizan Belgrade.
