= Julien Lebas =

French sprinter (1924–2021)

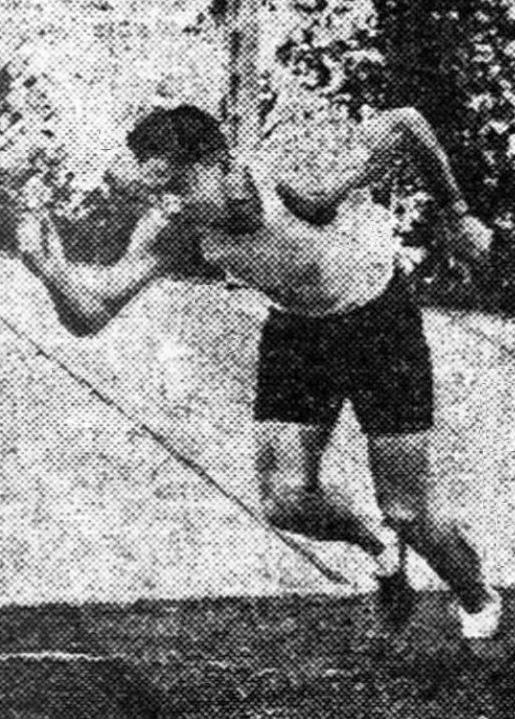
- Lebas in 1943

Personal information
- Nationality: French
- Born: 4 June 1924 Saint-Lô, France
- Died: 25 November 2021 (aged 97)

Sport
- Country: France
- Sport: Sprinting
Medal record
Men's athletics
Representing France
European Championships
Silver medal – second place	1946 Oslo	4×100 m

Julien Lebas (9 June 1924 – 25 November 2021) was a French sprinter who competed in the 1948 Summer Olympics. He died on 25 November 2021, at the age of 97.

== Competition record ==
Year	Competition	Venue	Position	Event	Notes
Representing France
1948	Olympics	London, England	5th, Qtr 1	200 m	
