= Rudolf Galin =

Croatian athlete

Personal information
- Nationality: Croatian
- Born: 1 April 1928 Zagreb, Yugoslavia
- Died: 8 August 2004 (aged 76) Zagreb, Croatia

Sport
- Sport: Athletics
- Event: Hammer throw

Rudolf Galin (1 April 1928 – 8 August 2004) was a Croatian athlete. He competed in the men's hammer throw at the 1952 Summer Olympics.
