= Jo Zwaan =

Dutch sprinter

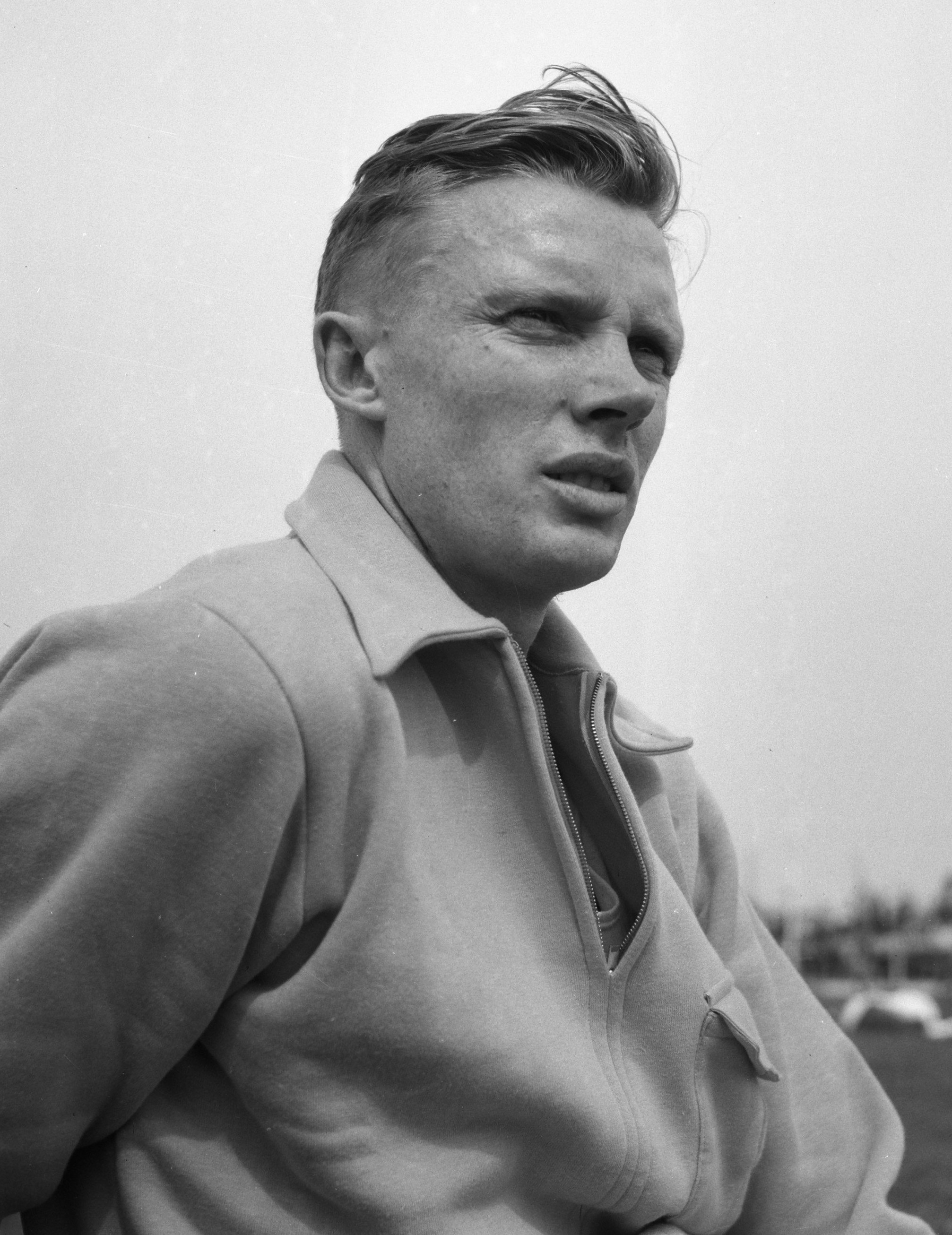
- Jo Zwaan in 1950

Personal information
- Nationality: Dutch
- Born: 11 November 1922 Amsterdam, Netherlands
- Died: 5 February 2012 (aged 89) Diemen, Netherlands

Sport
- Sport: Track and field
- Events: 100 m, 4×100 m
- Club: AAC, Amsterdam

Jo Zwaan (11 November 1922 – 5 February 2012) was a Dutch sprinter. He competed in the Men's 100 m and 4 × 100 m relay events at the 1948 Summer Olympics. Two years earlier he had already been present at the 1946 European Athletics Championships as part of the Dutch 4 × 100 m relay team, that finished in 4th position in 42.3 seconds.

His brother Jan was also an Olympic sprinter; he participated in the 110 m hurdles event at the 1948 Games.
