= Kemal Aksur =

Turkish sprinter

Personal information
- Nationality: Turkish
- Born: 29 October 1923 Istanbul, Turkey
- Died: 29 September 2001 (aged 77) Istanbul, Turkey

Sport
- Sport: Sprinting
- Event: 100 metres

Kemal Aksur (29 October 1923 – 29 September 2001) was a Turkish sprinter. He competed in the men's 100 metres at the 1948 Summer Olympics.
