= Ekrem Koçak =

Turkish middle-distance runner

Personal information
- Full name: Ekrem Koçak
- Nationality: Turkey
- Born: May 18, 1931
- Died: June 12, 1993 (aged 62)

Ekrem Koçak (18 May 1931 – 12 June 1993) was a Turkish middle distance runner who competed in the 1952 Summer Olympics and in the 1960 Summer Olympics. He won the Mediterranean and Balkan Games.

== Career ==
He started his career in Ankara Demirspor in 1947. He was elected to the Fenerbahçe S.K. Istanbul in 1949. He won two silver medals at 1,500 and 3,000 metres at the 1949 Eastern Mediterranean Games.

In 1950, he set a record of 3:58:5 at 1,500 meter. He finished third at 800 meter

at the first major international competition, the 1951 Mediterranean Games.

He won the Balkan Championships in 1955 at the 800 meter in 1953, 1954, 1955 and 1961. He won the gold medal at 800 m and at the Mediterranean Games at 800 m and at 1,500 m. He scored the best in Barcelona with a score of 1:50,0 (27 July 1955) and at 1,500 m in Sofia (May 24, 1960).

Having finished in 1966, he was the champion of the Balkans, 6 times in the Balkan world, and 2 times Mediterranean games champion, and 24 Turkish records and became nationalized more than 500 times. He won 13 Istanbul and 8 Turkish championships while part of Fenerbahçe.

After quitting running, his veins were found to be blocked due to lacquer growth and his left leg was voluntarily amputated. Koçak's name was attached to the athletic track at Burhan Felek Sports Complex in 1995, found in Istanbul.
