= AK Partizan =

- Founded: 1945
- Colors
- President: Dragan Vasiljević
- Manager: Dragan Životić

AK Partizan or Atletski Klub Partizan is an athletics club from Belgrade, Serbia. The club is part of the sports society JSD Partizan.

== History ==
The club was founded in 1945, being among the first five clubs of JSD Partizan.

== Honours ==
=== Men ===
- National championships :
  - Winners (25) : 1947, 1948, 1949, 1950, 1951, 1952, 1956, 1957, 1958, 1959, 1960, 1961, 1962, 1963, 1964, 1966, 1984, 1991, 1996, 1997, 1998, 1999, 2000, 2001, 2012
- National Cups :
  - Winners (8) : 1965, 1991, 1996, 1997, 1998, 1999, 2000, 2001

=== Women ===
- National championships :
  - Winners (11) : 1974, 1975, 1978, 1979, 1980, 1991, 1996, 1997, 1998, 1999, 2001
- National Cups :
  - Winners (16) : 1974, 1975, 1976, 1977, 1978, 1979, 1980, 1981, 1990, 1991, 1995, 1996, 1997, 1998, 1999, 2001

== Notable athletes ==
Field athletes

- Ivan Gubijan – hammer thrower, won silver at the Olympics in 1948.
- Dragutin Topić – Olympian, world junior co-record holder 2.37m, WJCH champion in 1990, European champion 1990.
- Dragan Perić – Serbian shot put record holder with 21.77m.
- Sead Krdžalić
- Radoman Šćekić
- Stevan Zorić
- Ivan Ivančić
- Danijela Čurović
- Daria Filipović-Živanović
- Tatjana Jelača – Olympian, Serbian record holder with 62.68m.European youth and junior champion in 2007 and 2009, world junior bronze medalist in 2010, Mediterranean games silver medalist in 2013.
- Asmir Kolašinac – Olympian, European bronze medalist and European indoor champion in shot put

Track athletes

- Franjo Mihalić – won silver at the Olympics in 1956 in marathon
- Dragoslav Prpa
- Jelena Jotanović – Serbian 100mH record holder with 13.19 +1,5 m/s.
- Petar Šegedin – European vice-champion in 3000m steeple chase
- Goran Raičević – long-distance runner, killed in Kosovo in 1999
- Darko Radomirović – Olympian; 1500-meter specialist, represented FR Yugoslavia at 2000 Summer Olympics
- Emir Bekrić – Olympian, World bronze medalist in 400mH, Serbian 400mH record holder with 48.05, European vice-champion in 400mH.
- Slobodan Branković – Serbian 400m, 4x400m record holder (45.30, 2:59.95), European indoor champion in 400m.
- Andrija Ottenheimer
- Josip Međimurec
- Goran Nava
- Miloš Raović
- Mladen Nikolić
- Đani Kovač
- Mileta Božović

== Additional Source for Notability of Existence ==
- "Etiopsko pojačanje za Srbiju". B92.rs. 2007-12-28.
