= Jiří David =

Czech sprinter

Personal information
- Nationality: Czech
- Born: 16 February 1923 Brno, Czechoslovakia
- Died: 19 June 1997 (aged 74) Brno, Czech Republic

Sport
- Sport: Sprinting
- Event: 400 metres
Medal record
Men's athletics
Representing Czechoslovakia
European Championships
Bronze medal – third place	1946 Oslo	200 m
Bronze medal – third place	1946 Oslo	4×100 m

Jiří David (16 February 1923 – 19 June 1997) was a Czech sprinter. He competed in the men's 400 metres at the 1952 Summer Olympics.

His wife was Olga Modrachová, a Czech athlete.
