= Avni Akgün =

Turkish long jumper

Personal information
- Nationality: Turkish
- Born: 1932 (age 93–94)

Sport
- Sport: Athletics
- Event: Long jump

Avni Akgün (born 1932) is a Turkish athlete. He competed in the men's long jump at the 1952 Summer Olympics.
