= René Valmy =

French sprinter

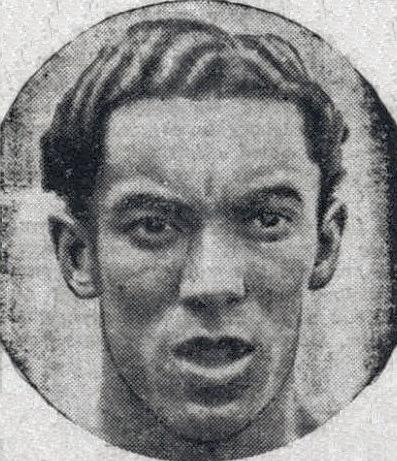
- Valmy in 1941

Medal record

Men's athletics

Representing France

European Championships
| Silver medal – second place | 1946 Oslo | 4×100 m |

René Valmy (24 December 1920 – 6 November 1977) was a French sprinter who competed in the 1948 Summer Olympics.

== Competition record ==
| Year | Competition | Venue | Position | Event | Notes |
Representing France
| 1948 | Olympics | London, England | 4th, QF 3 | 100 m | |
