= Carlo Monti =

Italian sprinter (1920–2016)

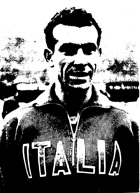

Personal information
- Nationality: Italian
- Born: 24 March 1920 Milan, Italy
- Died: 7 April 2016 (aged 96)
- Height: 1.72 m (5 ft 7 1/2 in)
- Weight: 64 kg (141 lb)

Sport
- Country: Italy
- Sport: Athletics
- Event: Sprint
- Club: US Milano

Achievements and titles
- Personal best: 100 m: 10.5 (1940)
Medal record
Men's athletics
Representing Italy
Olympic Games
Bronze medal – third place	1948 London	4x100 m
European Championships
Bronze medal – third place	1946 Oslo	100 m

Carlo Monti (24 March 1920 – 7 April 2016) was an Italian athlete who competed mainly in the 100 metres. He won two medals, one individual and one relay, in international athletics competitions.

== Biography ==
Monte competed for an Italy in the 1948 Summer Olympics held in London, Great Britain in the 4 x 100 metre relay where he won the bronze medal with his teammates Michele Tito, Enrico Perucconi and Antonio Siddi. In 1946 in the European Championships Monti won the bronze medal in the 100 metres.

== Olympic results ==
Year	Competition	Venue	Position	Event	Performance	Notes
1948	Olympic Games	(United Kingdom) London	3rd	4×100 metres relay	41.5	

== National titles ==
Carlo Monti has won 8 times the individual national championship.

- 4 wins in the 100 metres (1940, 1941, 1946, 1947)
- 4 wins in the 200 metres (1941, 1942, 1946, 1949)

== See also ==
- Italy national relay team
