= Mirja Jämes =

Finnish hurdler (1924–2020)

Mirja Salminen (born Jämes, 13 October 1924 – 20 July 2020) was a Finnish hurdler who competed in the 1948 Summer Olympics.
