= Doğan Acarbay =

Turkish sprinter (1927–2004)

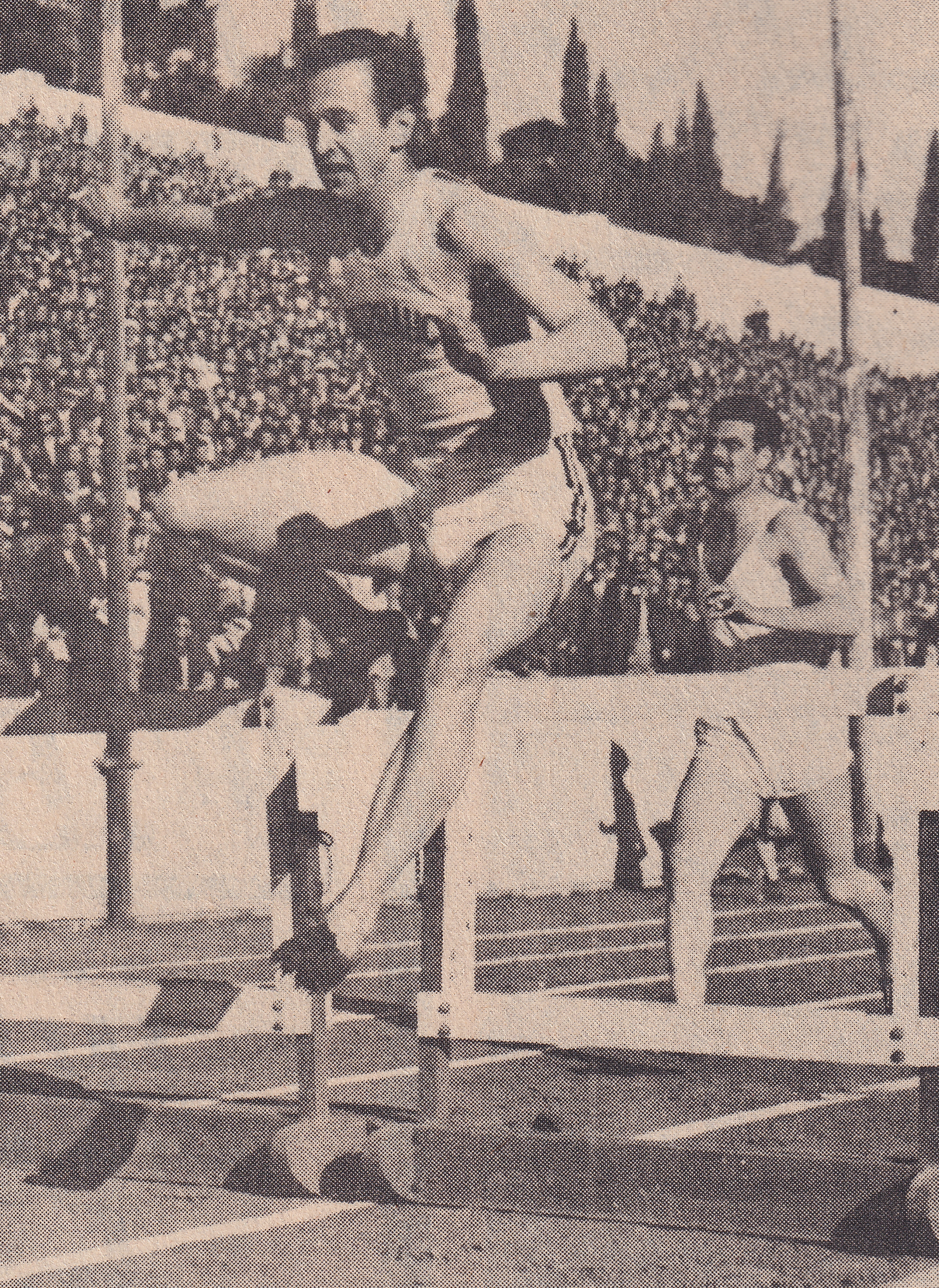

Personal information
- Nationality: Turkish
- Born: 5 February 1927 Tekirdağ, Turkey
- Died: 13 June 2004 (aged 77) Istanbul, Turkey

Sport
- Sport: Sprinting
- Event: 400 metres

E. Doğan Acarbay (5 February 1927 – 13 June 2004) was a Turkish sprinter. He competed in the 400 metres at the 1948 Summer Olympics and the 1952 Summer Olympics.
