= Ivan Gubijan =

Yugoslav hammer thrower

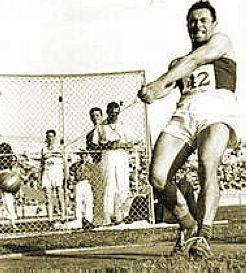

Personal information
- Nationality: Yugoslav
- Born: 14 June 1923 Bjelovar, Kingdom of Serbs, Croats, and Slovenes
- Died: 4 January 2009 (aged 85) Belgrade, Serbia
- Height: 172 cm (5 ft 8 in)
- Weight: 83 kg (183 lb)

Sport
- Sport: Athletics
- Event: Hammer throw
- Club: AK Partizan

Achievements and titles
- Personal best: 59.69 (1955)
Medal record
Representing Yugoslavia
Olympic Games
Silver medal – second place	1948 London	Hammer throw

Ivan Gubijan (14 June 1923 – 4 January 2009) was a Yugoslav hammer thrower. He competed in the 1948 and 1952 Olympics and placed second and ninth, respectively. He is credited with introducing the four-turn throwing technique, which is widely used today.

Gubijan finished second behind Duncan Clark in the hammer throw event at the British 1950 AAA Championships.
