= Nuri Turan =

Turkish athlete

Personal information
- Nationality: Turkish
- Born: 4 July 1924
- Died: 5 January 2016 (aged 91)

Sport
- Sport: Athletics
- Events: Shot put Discus

Nuri Turan (4 July 1924 – 5 January 2016) was a Turkish athlete. He competed in the men's shot put and the men's discus throw at the 1952 Summer Olympics.
