= Michele Tito =

Italian athletics competitor

Personal information
- Nationality: Italian
- Born: June 18, 1920 Trieste, Italy
- Died: 11 January 1961 (aged 40) Italy

Sport
- Country: Italy
- Sport: Athletics
- Event: Sprint

Achievements and titles
- Personal best: 100 m: 10.5 (1941)
Medal record
Bronze medal – third place	1948 London	4x100 metre relay

Michele Tito (18 June 1920 – 11 January 1961) was an Italian athlete who competed mainly in the 100 metres.

== Biography ==
He was born in Trieste and competed for an Italy in the 1948 Summer Olympics held in London, Great Britain in the 4 x 100 metre relay where he won the bronze medal with his team mates Enrico Perucconi, Antonio Siddi and Carlo Monti.

== Olympic results ==
Year	Competition	Venue	Position	Event	Performance	Notes
1948	Olympic Games	(United Kingdom) London	3rd	4×100 metres relay	41.5	

== See also ==
- Italy national relay team
