= Mustafa Özcan =

Turkish long-distance runner (born 1926)

Mustafa Özcan (1926 – before 2013) was a Turkish long-distance runner who competed in the 1948 Summer Olympics. Özcan died prior to 2013.
