= Zdravko Ceraj =

Croatian long-distance runner

Olympic medal record

Representing Yugoslavia

Men's athletics

Mediterranean Games
Silver medal – second place	1951 Alexandria	5000 m
Bronze medal – third place	1951 Alexandria	1500 m

Zdravko Ceraj (4 October 1920 – 6 October 2011) was a Croatian long-distance runner who competed for SFR Yugoslavia in the 1952 Summer Olympics. At the 1951 Mediterranean Games, he won a silver medal in 5000 m event. He was born in Bjelovar and died in Zagreb. He competed for Partizan Belgrade.
