= Finnbjörn Þorvaldsson =

Icelandic sprinter (1924–2018)

Personal information
- Born: 25 May 1924 Hnífsdalur, Kingdom of Iceland
- Died: 9 July 2018 (aged 94)
- Height: 180 cm (5 ft 11 in)
- Weight: 71 kg (157 lb)
- Spouse: Theodóra Steffensen

Sport
- Sport: Track and field, basketball, handball
- Club: Íþróttafélag Reykjavíkur

Finnbjörn Þorvaldsson (25 May 1924 – 9 July 2018) was an Icelandic multi-sport athlete who competed in sprinting in the 1948 Summer Olympics. He also won national championships in both handball and basketball with Íþróttafélag Reykjavíkur.

== Early life ==
Finnbjörn was born in Hnífsdalur, Westfjords. At a young age he moved to Ísafjörður and later to Reykjavík with his parents.

== Sports career ==
Finnbjörn was best known for his achievements in track and field, especially in sprinting where he won several national and nordic championships. He was the flag bearer for Iceland at the 1948 Summer Olympics where he competed in sprinting. He also competed in handball and basketball. He won the Icelandic national championship in handball in 1946 with Íþróttafélag Reykjavíkur after scoring the winning goal in ÍR's 20–19 victory against Haukar. In 1954, Finnbjörn won the national championship in basketball with ÍR's basketball team.

== Death ==
Finnbjörn died on 9 July 2018 at the age of 94.
