= Gabe Scholten =

Dutch sprinter

Personal information
- Born: 29 June 1921 Amsterdam, the Netherlands
- Died: 23 February 1997 (aged 75) Groningen, the Netherlands

Sport
- Sport: Sprint
- Club: AV '23, Amsterdam

Gabe Scholten (29 June 1921 – 23 February 1997) was a Dutch sprinter. He competed at the 1948 Summer Olympics in the 200 m and 4 × 100 m events and finished in sixth place in the relay. Two years earlier his team was fourth in the relay at the 1946 European Athletics Championships.

== Competition record ==
Year	Competition	Venue	Position	Event	Notes
Representing Netherlands
1948	Olympics	London, England	3rd, Heat 11	200 m	22.2
