= Cahit Önel =

Turkish middle-distance runner

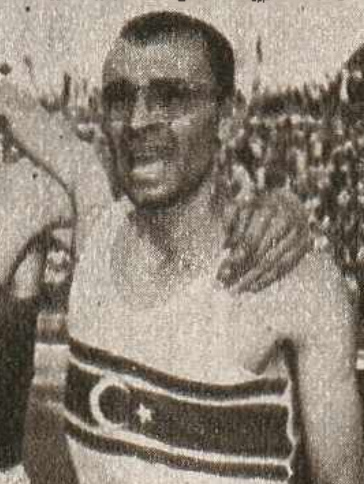
Önel in 1957

Cahit Önel (23 November 1927 – 17 September 1970) was a Turkish middle distance runner who competed in the 1948 Summer Olympics, in the 1952 Summer Olympics, in the 1960 Summer Olympics, and in the 1964 Summer Olympics.
