= Marko Račič =

Slovenian athlete (1920–2022)

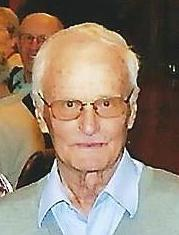
- Račič in 2015

Personal information
- Nationality: Slovenian
- Born: 25 April 1920 Adlešiči, Kingdom of Serbs, Croats and Slovenes
- Died: 27 May 2022 (aged 102) Križ, Sežana, Slovenia
- Occupation: Athlete

Sport
- Sport: Track and field

Achievements and titles
- Olympic finals: 1948 Summer Olympics

Marko Račič (25 April 1920 – 27 May 2022) was a Slovenian athlete who participated in the 1948 Summer Olympics in London. Representing Yugoslavia, he advanced to the semi-finals of the men's 400 metre competition, but did not make it beyond the opening round of the men's 4 × 400 metres relay. A local and state sprinting record holder, Račič competed internationally for many years and made appearances at the 1946 and 1950 European Athletics Championships prior to taking up personal training and coaching in 1953. He served as an international athletics judge and an amateur sports administrator who was on committees for several international sporting events in Yugoslavia, including the 1984 Winter Olympics. From June 2013 until his death, he was the oldest living Slovenian Olympic competitor.

== Early life and athletic career ==
Račič was born in Adlešiči near Črnomelj in 1920. He ran his first official race, at 100 metres, on his seventeenth birthday and won it, eventually growing to specialize in this and the 200-metre distance. Athletically active during high school, he furthered his training at a special sports institute in Belgrade. He eventually became a member of JSD Partizan, a military sports club based out of Belgrade, at which point his athletic career began to take off. He captured numerous local and state championships and earned records in the 100- and 200-metre disciplines prior to taking his career international and representing Yugoslavia abroad.

Among Račič's sixteen international appearances for the country were the 1946 European Athletics Championships in Oslo and the 1950 edition in Brussels, as well as several editions of the Balkan Games. At the 1948 Summer Olympics in London, he was eliminated in the semifinals of the men's 400 metres competition and did not make it out of the opening round of the men's 4 × 400 metres relay. He was not permitted to bring a sports trainer, but was instead accompanied by a political agent to ensure that he did not stray from his nation's communist ideology. He achieved his personal best time of 49 seconds at 400 metres the following year. Throughout his career he set over twenty national records at various sprint distances.

== Later life ==
After his competitive career ended, Račič continued to pursue athletics as lifelong work. He became a trainer in 1953 and served as coach of the Slovenian women's national athletic team from 1960 through 1968. In addition to roles in his native country, he also coached in Sweden and Kuwait. He was eventually certified as an international athletics judge, a role in which, as of 2009, he continued to serve. On the administrative side, he worked on committees that helped organize the 1979 Mediterranean Games in Split, the 1984 Winter Olympics in Sarajevo, and the 1987 Summer Universiade in Zagreb. In 1997, he became the only Slovenian to receive the Gold Badge of the European Athletic Association and in 2001 garnered recognition from the International Olympic Committee for his contribution to amateur sports.

In September 2010, Račič became the second-oldest living Slovenian Olympic athlete, behind Tone Pogačnik. At the time, he was working on a book detailing the history of Slovenian athletics based on his research as well as his personal experiences. He became the oldest living Slovenian Olympic athlete upon Pogačnik's death in June 2013. He died on 27 May 2022, at the age of 102.
