= Andrija Otenhajmer =

Yugoslav middle-distance runner

Personal information
- Nationality: Yugoslav
- Born: 16 October 1926
- Died: 26 March 1999 (aged 72)

Sport
- Sport: Middle-distance running
- Event: 1500 metres

Andrija Otenhajmer (16 October 1926 – 26 March 1999) was a Yugoslav middle-distance runner. He competed in the men's 1500 metres at the 1952 Summer Olympics.
