= Fernand Bourgaux =

Belgian sprinter

Personal information
- Nationality: Belgian
- Born: 25 December 1919 Woluwé-Saint-Pierre, Belgium

Sport
- Sport: Sprinting
- Event: 200 metres

Fernand Bourgaux (born 25 December 1919, date of death unknown) was a Belgian sprinter. He competed in the men's 200 metres at the 1948 Summer Olympics.
