= 1951 Mediterranean Games =

1st edition of the Mediterranean Games

I Mediterranean Games Alexandria 1951
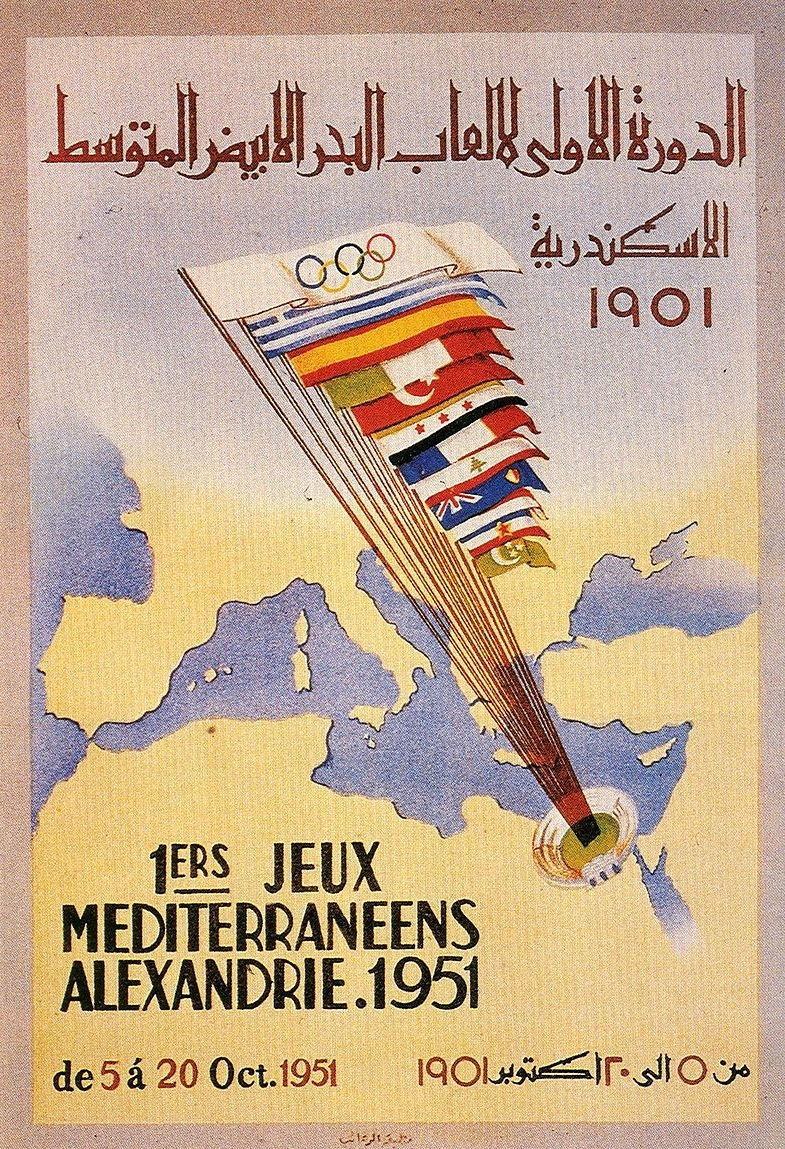
- Host city: Alexandria, Egypt
- Nations: 10
- Athletes: 734
- Events: 13 sports
- Opening: 5 October 1951
- Closing: 20 October 1951
- Opened by: Farouk of Egypt
- Main venue: Alexandria Stadium

The 1951 Mediterranean Games, officially known as the I Mediterranean Games, and commonly known as Alexandria 1951, were the 1st Mediterranean Games. The Games were held for 15 days from 5 to 20 October 1951 in Alexandria, Egypt, where 734 athletes (all men) from 10 countries participated. There were a total of 13 different sports.

== Participating nations ==
The following is a list of nations that participated in the 1951 Mediterranean Games:

- Egypt (243)
- France (42)
- Greece (129)
- Italy (99)
- Lebanon (48)
- Malta (3)
- Spain (36)
- Syria (65)
- Turkey (52)
- Yugoslavia (17)

== Sports ==
The inaugural Mediterranean Games sports program featured 13 sports encompassing 91 men-only events. The number in parentheses next to the sport is the number of medal events per sport.

- Athletics (23)
- Basketball (1)
- Boxing (9)
- Diving (2)
- Fencing (6)
- Football (1)
- Gymnastics (8)
- Rowing (5)
- Shooting (5)
- Swimming (7)
- Water polo (1)
- Weightlifting (7)
- Wrestling (16)

== Medal table ==
The rankings sort by the number of gold medals earned by a country. The number of silvers is taken into consideration next and then the number of bronze. Equal ranking is given and they are listed alphabetically if after the above, countries are still tied. This follows the system used by the IOC, IAAF and BBC.

| Rank | Nation | Gold | Silver | Bronze | Total |
|---|---|---|---|---|---|
| 1 | Italy | 27 | 22 | 12 | 61 |
| 2 | France | 26 | 13 | 5 | 44 |
| 3 | Egypt | 20 | 26 | 19 | 65 |
| 4 | Turkey | 10 | 3 | 7 | 20 |
| 5 | Greece | 4 | 9 | 8 | 21 |
| 6 | Yugoslavia | 3 | 5 | 7 | 15 |
| 7 | Spain | 2 | 4 | 4 | 10 |
| 8 | Lebanon | 0 | 5 | 14 | 19 |
| 9 | Syria | 0 | 3 | 10 | 13 |
| Totals (9 entries) | | 92 | 90 | 86 | 268 |
