= Athletics at the 1950 British Empire Games – Men's 100 yards =

Men's 100 yards at the 1950 British Empire Games
- Venue: Eden Park
- Date: 5 February
- Competitors: 20 from 7 nations
- Winning time: 9.7

Medalists
gold medal	John Treloar	Australia
silver medal	Bill De Gruchy	Australia
bronze medal	Don Pettie	Canada

The men's 100 yards event at the 1950 British Empire Games was held on 5 February at the Eden Park in Auckland, New Zealand.

== Results ==
=== Heats ===
Qualification: First 3 in each heat (Q) qualify directly for the semifinals.

Rank	Heat	Name	Nationality	Time	Notes
1	1	Don Pettie	Canada	9.9	Q
2	1	Arthur Eustace	New Zealand	??.?	Q
3	1	Leslie Lewis	England	??.?	Q
4	1	David Johnson	Australia	??.?	
5	1	Sumana Navaratnam	Ceylon	??.?	
1	2	Peter Henderson	New Zealand	9.9	Q
2	2	Bill De Gruchy	Australia	9.9	Q
3	2	Jack Archer	England	??.?	Q
4	2	Orisi Dawai	Fiji	10.1e	
5	2	Gordon Crosby	Canada	10.5e	
1	3	Scotchy Gordon	Australia	10.0	Q
2	3	Brian Shenton	England	??.?	Q
3	3	Kevin Beardsley	New Zealand	??.?	Q
4	3	Manasa Nukuvou	Fiji	10.2e	
5	3	Stan Egerton	Canada	10.6e	
1	4	John Treloar	Australia	9.7	Q, =GR
2	4	Clem Parker	New Zealand	??.?	Q
3	4	Karim Olowu	Nigeria	??.?	Q
4	4	Nicolas Stacey	England	10.2e	
	4	Ron Miller	Canada	DNS	

=== Semifinals ===
Qualification: First 3 in each heat (Q) qualify directly for the final.

Rank	Heat	Name	Nationality	Time	Notes
1	1	Don Pettie	Canada	9.8	Q
2	1	Peter Henderson	New Zealand	?.?	Q
3	1	Bill De Gruchy	Australia	9.9	Q
4	1	Leslie Lewis	England	10.0e	
5	1	Brian Shenton	England	10.2e	
6	1	Kevin Beardsley	New Zealand	10.2e	
1	2	John Treloar	Australia	9.7	Q, =GR
2	2	Scotchy Gordon	Australia	9.8	Q
3	2	Clem Parker	New Zealand	?.?	Q
4	2	Jack Archer	England	9.9e	
5	2	Karim Olowu	Nigeria	10.0e	
6	2	Arthur Eustace	New Zealand	10.1e	

=== Final ===
Rank	Lane	Name	Nationality	Time	Notes
1st place, gold medalist(s)	2	John Treloar	Australia	9.7	=GR
2nd place, silver medalist(s)	5	Bill De Gruchy	Australia	9.8	FS
3rd place, bronze medalist(s)	3	Don Pettie	Canada	9.8	FS2
4	6	Scotchy Gordon	Australia	9.9e	
5	1	Peter Henderson	New Zealand	9.9e	
6	4	Clem Parker	New Zealand	10.0e	
