= Athletics at the 1950 British Empire Games – Men's 220 yards =

Men's 220 yards at the Commonwealth Games

The men's 220 yards event at the 1950 British Empire Games was held on 7 and 9 February at the Eden Park in Auckland, New Zealand.

== Medalists ==
Gold	Silver	Bronze
John Treloar; Australia	David Johnson; Australia	Don Jowett; New Zealand

== Results ==
=== Heats ===
Held on 7 February

Qualification: First 3 in each heat (Q) qualify directly for the semifinals.

Rank	Heat	Name	Nationality	Time	Notes
1	1	Don Jowett	New Zealand	22.4	Q
2	1	Jack Archer	England	22.9	Q
3	1	Bill De Gruchy	Australia	22.9	Q
4	1	John De Saram	Ceylon	??.?	
	1	Gordon Crosby	Canada	DNS	
1	2	Dave Batten	New Zealand	22.4	Q
2	2	Scotchy Gordon	Australia	23.0	Q
3	2	Brian Shenton	England	23.1	Q
4	2	Oscar Wijeyasinghe	Ceylon	??.?	
1	3	John Treloar	Australia	21.7	Q
2	3	Clem Parker	New Zealand	22.6	Q
3	3	Nicolas Stacey	England	22.8	Q
4	3	Manasa Nukuvou	Fiji	??.?	
	3	Sumana Navaratnam	Ceylon	DNS	
1	4	Don Pettie	Canada	22.1	Q
2	4	David Johnson	Australia	22.1	Q
3	4	Orisi Dawai	Fiji	22.1	Q
	4	Leslie Lewis	England	DQ	
	4	Derek Pugh	England	DNS	

=== Semifinals ===
Held on 7 February

Qualification: First 3 in each heat (Q) qualify directly for the final.

Rank	Heat	Name	Nationality	Time	Notes
1	1	John Treloar	Australia	21.7	Q
2	1	Don Jowett	New Zealand	22.1	Q
3	1	Don Pettie	Canada	22.1	Q
4	1	Bill De Gruchy	Australia	??.?	
5	1	Brian Shenton	England	??.?	
6	1	Orisi Dawai	Fiji	??.?	
1	2	David Johnson	Australia	22.0	Q
2	2	Scotchy Gordon	Australia	22.0	Q
3	2	Clem Parker	New Zealand	22.0	Q
4	2	Dave Batten	New Zealand	??.?	
5	2	Jack Archer	England	??.?	
6	2	Nicolas Stacey	England	??.?	

=== Final ===
Held on 9 February

Rank	Lane	Name	Nationality	Time	Notes
1st place, gold medalist(s)	2	John Treloar	Australia	21.5	
2nd place, silver medalist(s)	3	David Johnson	Australia	21.8	
3rd place, bronze medalist(s)	5	Don Jowett	New Zealand	21.8	
4	1	Scotchy Gordon	Australia	21.9e	
5	4	Don Pettie	Canada	21.9e	
6	6	Clem Parker	New Zealand	22.2e	
