= Athletics at the 1948 Summer Olympics – Men's 200 metres =

Men's 200 metres at the Games of the XIV Olympiad
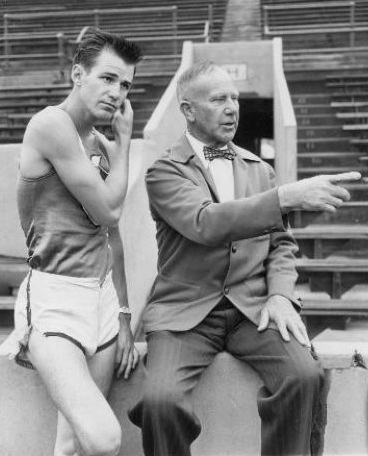
- Mel Patton (left)
- Venue: Empire Stadium
- Dates: 2 August 1948 (heats and quarterfinals); 3 August 1948 (semifinals and final)
- Competitors: 51 from 28 nations
- Winning time: 21.1

Medalists
1st place, gold medalist(s)		Mel Patton; United States
2nd place, silver medalist(s)		Barney Ewell; United States
3rd place, bronze medalist(s)		Lloyd La Beach; Panama

The men's 200 metres sprint event at the 1948 Summer Olympics took place between 2 August and 3 August. There were 51 competitors from 28 nations. The maximum number of athletes per nation had been set at 3 since the 1930 Olympic Congress. The final was won by American Mel Patton. His countryman Barney Ewell earned silver, making this the third consecutive Games the United States took the top two spots in the event. Lloyd La Beach's bronze gave Panama a medal in its debut in the event.

== Background ==
This was the 10th appearance of the event, which was not held at the first Olympics in 1896 but has been on the program ever since. None of the six finalists from the pre-war 1936 Games returned. The Americans were favored. Barney Ewell was the 1946 and 1947 AAU champion. Mel Patton was a short sprint specialist who had been disappointed by a fifth-place finish in the 100 metres earlier in the Games; he had never won an American title at the longer sprint distance. European champion Nikolay Karakulov did not compete because the Soviet Union did not yet participate in the Olympics.

Bermuda, Burma, Ceylon, Cuba, Iceland, Iraq, Jamaica, Pakistan, Panama, Peru, Trinidad and Tobago, and Uruguay each made their debut in the event. The United States made its 10th appearance, the only nation to have competed at each edition of the 200 metres to date.

== Competition format ==
The competition used the four round format introduced in 1920: heats, quarterfinals, semifinals, and a final. There were 12 heats of between 3 and 6 runners each, with the top 2 men in each advancing to the quarterfinals. The quarterfinals consisted of 4 heats of 6 athletes each; the 3 fastest men in each heat advanced to the semifinals. There were 2 semifinals, each with 6 runners. Again, the top 3 athletes advanced. The final had 6 runners. The races were run on a now-standard 400 metre track.

== Records ==
Prior to the competition, the existing World and Olympic records were as follows.

World record	Jesse Owens (USA)	20.3	Michigan, United States	1935
Olympic record	Jesse Owens (USA)	20.7	Berlin, Germany	5 August 1936

No new world or Olympic records were set during the competition.

== Schedule ==
All times are British Summer Time (UTC+1)

Date	Time	Round
Monday, 2 August 1948	14:30; 16:15	Heats; Quarterfinals
Tuesday, 3 August 1948	15:30; 17:15	Semifinals; Final

== Results ==
=== Heats ===
The fastest two runners in each of the twelve heats advanced to the quarterfinals.

==== Heat 1 ====
Wind: +0.5 m/s

Rank	Athlete	Nation	Time (hand)	Time (automatic)	Notes
1	Herb McKenley	Jamaica	21.3	21.4	Q
2	Ted Haggis	Canada	22.2		Q
3	Haukur Clausen	Iceland	22.2		
4	Stanley Lines	Bermuda	Unknown		
–	Bogdan Lipski	Poland	DNS		

==== Heat 2 ====
Wind: 0.0 m/s

Rank	Athlete	Nation	Time (hand)	Notes
1	Paul Vallé	Great Britain	22.3	Q
2	John De Saram	Ceylon	23.1	Q
3	Bernabe Lovina	Philippines	23.2	
4	Stefanos Petrakis	Greece	Unknown	
–	John Bartram	Australia	DNS	

==== Heat 3 ====
Wind: +1.2 m/s

Rank	Athlete	Nation	Time (hand)	Notes
1	Rafael Fortún	Cuba	21.9	Q
2	Dennis Shore	South Africa	22.1	Q
3	António Morais	Portugal	22.6	
–	Eric Prabhakar	India	DNS	
–	Alberto Biedermann	Argentina	DNS	

==== Heat 4 ====
Wind: +0.8 m/s

Rank	Athlete	Nation	Time (hand)	Notes
1	Barney Ewell	United States	21.6	Q
2	Abram van Heerden	South Africa	21.8	Q
3	Angel García	Cuba	22.2	
4	Fernand Linssen	Belgium	Unknown	
5	Hazzard Dill	Bermuda	Unknown	
6	Ali Salman	Iraq	Unknown	

==== Heat 5 ====
Wind: +0.1 m/s

Rank	Athlete	Nation	Time (hand)	Notes
1	Julien Lebas	France	22.0	Q
2	Rosalvo Ramos	Brazil	22.2	Q
3	Basil McKenzie	Jamaica	22.4	
–	Morris Curotta	Australia	DNS	
–	Tomás Paquete	Portugal	DNS	

==== Heat 6 ====
Wind: +1.0 m/s

Rank	Athlete	Nation	Time (hand)	Notes
1	Mel Patton	United States	21.6	Q
2	Leslie Laing	Jamaica	21.8	Q
3	Guillermo Geary	Argentina	23.0	
4	Duncan White	Ceylon	Unknown	
–	Ricardo Sáenz	Spain	DNS	

==== Heat 7 ====
Wind: +0.6 m/s

Rank	Athlete	Nation	Time (hand)	Notes
1	Gerardo Bönnhoff	Argentina	22.2	Q
2	John Fairgrieve	Great Britain	22.2	Q
3	Raúl Mazorra	Cuba	23.0	
4	Kemal Aksur	Turkey	Unknown	
5	Gonzalo Rodríguez	Mexico	Unknown	

==== Heat 8 ====
Wind: +0.2 m/s

Rank	Athlete	Nation	Time (hand)	Time (automatic)	Notes
1	Cliff Bourland	United States	21.3	21.7	Q
2	Haroldo da Silva	Brazil	21.9		Q
3	Georgie Lewis	Trinidad and Tobago	22.4		
4	Walter Pérez	Uruguay	Unknown		
5	Peter Bloch	Norway	Unknown		

==== Heat 9 ====
Wind: +0.4 m/s

Rank	Athlete	Nation	Time (hand)	Time (automatic)	Notes
1	John Treloar	Australia	21.7	21.8	Q
2	Muhammad Sharif Butt	Pakistan	22.8		Q
3	Rasit Öztas	Turkey	23.0		
4	Perry Johnson	Bermuda	Unknown		
–	John O'Donnell	Ireland	DNS		

==== Heat 10 ====
Wind: +0.5 m/s

Rank	Athlete	Nation	Time (hand)	Time (automatic)	Notes
1	Alastair McCorquodale	Great Britain	22.3	22.3	Q
2	Santiago Ferrando	Peru	22.5		Q
3	Fernand Bourgaux	Belgium	22.9		
4	Étienne Bally	France	Unknown		
–	Jack Parry	Canada	DNS		

==== Heat 11 ====
Wind: +0.2 m/s

Rank	Athlete	Nation	Time (hand)	Time (automatic)	Notes
1	Juan López	Uruguay	22.1	22.2	Q
2	Ivan Hausen	Brazil	22.2		Q
3	Gabe Scholten	Netherlands	22.2		
4	Maung Sein Pe	Burma	Unknown		
–	Ferenc Tima	Hungary	DNS		

==== Heat 12 ====
Wind: +0.4 m/s

Rank	Athlete	Nation	Time (hand)	Time (automatic)	Notes
1	Lloyd LaBeach	Panama	21.4	21.7	Q
2	Jan Lammers	Netherlands	22.0		Q
3	Don Pettie	Canada	22.0		
4	Mario Fayos	Uruguay	Unknown		
5	Joseph Stéphan	France	Unknown		

=== Quarterfinals ===
The fastest three runners in each of the four heats advanced to the semifinal round.

==== Quarterfinal 1 ====
Wind: 0.0 m/s

Rank	Athlete	Nation	Time (hand)	Time (automatic)	Notes
1	Herb McKenley	Jamaica	21.3	21.6	Q
2	Barney Ewell	United States	21.8		Q
3	Paul Vallé	Great Britain	22.1		Q
4	Jan Lammers	Netherlands	Unknown		
5	Julien Lebas	France	Unknown		
6	Rosalvo Ramos	Brazil	Unknown		

==== Quarterfinal 2 ====
Wind: 0.0 m/s

Rank	Athlete	Nation	Time (hand)	Notes
1	Cliff Bourland	United States	21.3	Q
2	John Treloar	Australia	21.5	Q
3	Haroldo da Silva	Brazil	22.0	Q
4	Gerardo Bönnhoff	Argentina	Unknown	
5	Dennis Shore	South Africa	Unknown	
6	John De Saram	Ceylon	Unknown	

==== Quarterfinal 3 ====
Wind: 0.0 m/s

Rank	Athlete	Nation	Time (hand)	Notes
1	Lloyd La Beach	Panama	21.7	Q
2	Leslie Laing	Jamaica	21.8	Q
3	Abram van Heerden	South Africa	22.9	Q
4	John Fairgrieve	Great Britain	Unknown	
5	Santiago Ferrando	Peru	Unknown	
—	Juan López	Uruguay	DNS	

==== Quarterfinal 4 ====
Wind: 0.0 m/s

Rank	Athlete	Nation	Time (hand)	Notes
1	Mel Patton	United States	21.4	Q
2	Alastair McCorquodale	Great Britain	21.8	Q
3	Rafael Fortún	Cuba	22.0	Q
4	Ivan Hausen	Brazil	22.3	
5	Ted Haggis	Canada	Unknown	
6	Muhammad Sharif Butt	Pakistan	Unknown	

=== Semifinals ===
The fastest three runners in each of the two heats advanced to the final round.

==== Semifinal 1 ====
Wind: +0.4 m/s

Rank	Athlete	Nation	Time (hand)	Time (automatic)	Notes
1	Herb McKenley	Jamaica	21.4	21.4	Q
2	Mel Patton	United States	21.6	21.66	Q
3	Barney Ewell	United States	21.8	21.96	Q
4	Haroldo da Silva	Brazil	Unknown	22.22	
5	Abram van Heerden	South Africa	Unknown	22.25	
6	Paul Vallé	Great Britain	Unknown	22.49	

==== Semifinal 2 ====
Wind: 0.0 m/s

Rank	Athlete	Nation	Time (hand)	Time (automatic)	Notes
1	Cliff Bourland	United States	21.5	21.6	Q
2	Lloyd La Beach	Panama	21.6	21.79	Q
3	Leslie Laing	Jamaica	21.6	21.80	Q
4	John Treloar	Australia	Unknown	21.99	
5	Alastair McCorquodale	Great Britain	Unknown	22.19	
6	Rafael Fortún	Cuba	Unknown	22.51	

=== Final ===
Wind: 0.0 m/s

Rank	Athlete	Nation	Time (hand)	Time (automatic)	Notes
1st place, gold medalist(s)	Mel Patton	United States	21.1	21.3	
2nd place, silver medalist(s)	Barney Ewell	United States	21.1	21.35	
3rd place, bronze medalist(s)	Lloyd La Beach	Panama	21.2	21.50	
4	Herb McKenley	Jamaica	21.3e	21.54	
5	Cliff Bourland	United States	21.3e	21.57	
6	Leslie Laing	Jamaica	21.8e	22.02	
