= Bill de Gruchy =

Australian sprinter (1930–2025)

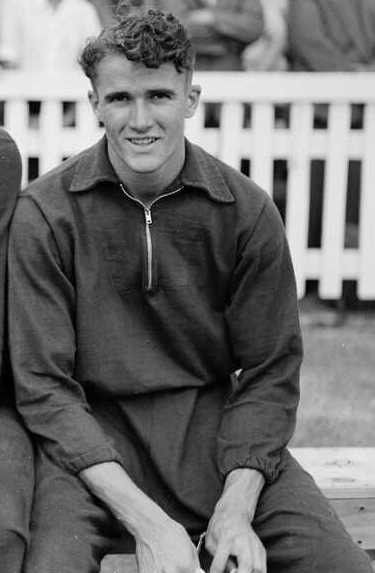

Personal information
- Born: Arthur William de Gruchy; 10 May 1930 Perth, Australia
- Died: 28 August 2025 (aged 95) Joondalup, Australia

Sport
- Sport: Athletics
- Event: Sprinting
Medal record
Representing Australia
British Empire Games
Gold medal – first place	1950 Auckland	4 × 110 y relay
Silver medal – second place	1950 Auckland	100 yards

Arthur William de Gruchy (10 May 1930 – 28 August 2025) was an Australian athlete who specialised in sprinting.

== Biography ==
A Western Australian athlete, de Gruchy was raised in the Perth suburb of Mount Hawthorn.

De Gruchy studied at both St Patrick's Boys' School and Aquinas College in Perth.

In 1950, de Gruchy represented Australia at the British Empire Games in Auckland, where he won a silver medal in the 100 yard sprint and was a member of the gold medal-winning 4 × 110 yards relay team.

He won the national 100 yard sprint title for the only time in 1951, edging three-time champion John Treloar. He was overlooked in favour of John Treloar for the 1952 Helsinki Olympics.

At the 1952 WA state championships, de Gruchy ran the 100 yard sprint in a wind assisted 9.6 seconds.

De Gruchy died in Joondalup on 28 August 2025, at the age of 95.

== See also ==
- List of Commonwealth Games medallists in athletics (men)
