= Oscar Wijesinghe =

Sri Lankan sprinter

Oscar Wijesinghe was a Sri Lankan track and field athlete.

== Career ==
He predominantly captained his school St Thomas College in various sporting disciplines in cricket, field hockey and in the track and field athletics during the late 1940s and early 1950s.

During his university years, he formed a formidable rivalry and duels with John de Saram in the track and field discipline participating in categories of 100m, 200m and 400m. The closely fought contests in relevant categories between the duo drew widespread attention from all quarters and their tense rivalry also brought in huge crowds. More importantly, Oscar Wijesinghe was a Thomian whereas John de Saram was a Royalist which eventually created a lot of buzz and hype among public, while also taking their old-aged popular school rivalry (St Thomas College and Royal College) to the next level stepping into university days and the level of expectations grew exponentially among the fans whenever both of them competed during their university days.

Later on, both Oscar and de Saram combined and collaborated by building up a rapport and good level of understanding among each other by playing together in the same field representing Ceylon at international competitions despite the aggressive and tense competitive moments between the duo during their university days. He teamed up with fellow prominent track and field athletes Duncan White, John de Saram and Summa Navaratnam in the men's 4 × 110 yards event where Sri Lanka finished in fourth position during the 1950 British Empire Games.

On 4 February 1948, on a day when Ceylon seemingly gained independence from the British governance, he alongside fellow athletes Lakshman Kadirgamar, Duncan White and M. A. M. Sherrif representing the main four prominent ethnicities of Ceylon marked the important occasion in the country's history by bringing up four scrolls to the Independence Square with the intention of handing over such scrolls to the prime minister, D. S. Senanayake, in order to read aloud the important message written on such scrolls addressing the public.

== Personal life ==
After his stellar illustrious sporting career, he left Sri Lanka and migrated to permanently settle in the United States along with his wife Barbara.

== Death ==
He died on 16 February 2005 in the US, as a result of being confronted with cancer. In a letter penned by his wife Barbara addressing to Ronnie Weerakoon who was one of the prominent members of the 1946 St. Thomas cricket team, Barbara confirmed about the death of Oscar that was later published in local news outlets in Sri Lanka.
