= Athletics at the 1948 Summer Olympics – Men's 100 metres =

Men's 100 metres at the Games of the XIV Olympiad
- Venue: Wembley Stadium; London, England
- Dates: 30 July 1948 (heats, quarterfinals); 31 July 1948 (semifinals, final)
- Competitors: 63 from 33 nations
- Winning time: 10.3 seconds

Medalists
1st place, gold medalist(s)		Harrison Dillard	United States
2nd place, silver medalist(s)		Barney Ewell	United States
3rd place, bronze medalist(s)		Lloyd LaBeach	Panama

Official Video Highlights

The men's 100 metres sprint event at the 1948 Olympic Games in London, England, we held at Wembley Stadium on 30 and 31 July. Sixty-three athletes from 33 nations competed; each nation was limited to 3 runners by rules set at the 1930 Olympic Congress. The final was won by American Harrison Dillard, in a photo finish. Lloyd LaBeach of Panama won his nation's first medal in the men's 100 metres, a bronze. This was the first time a photo finish camera was used at an Olympic Games. The photo finish equipment consisted of a photoelectric cell, called the Magic Eye, produced by Swiss watchmaker Omega and a slit photography camera produced by the British Race Finish Recording Company.

== Background ==
This was the eleventh time the event was held, having appeared at every Olympics since the first in 1896. With a 12 year gap due to World War II, none of the athletes from the 1936 edition returned. Notable entrants and favorites were American Mel Patton and Panamanian Lloyd LaBeach. American Barney Ewell was a "top sprinter" but "felt to be slightly past his prime". The third member of the United States team was Harrison Dillard, a hurdles specialist who had also entered the 100 metres and came in third at the U.S. Olympic trials.

Bermuda, Burma, Guyana, Iraq, Jamaica, Pakistan, Panama, Trinidad and Tobago, and Uruguay were represented in the event for the first time. The United States was the only nation to have appeared at each of the first eleven Olympic men's 100 metres events.

== Competition format ==
The event retained the four round format from 1920–1936: heats, quarterfinals, semifinals, and a final. There were 12 heats, of 4–7 athletes each, with the top 2 in each heat advancing to the quarterfinals. The 24 quarterfinalists were placed into 4 heats of 6 athletes. The top 3 in each quarterfinal advanced to the semifinals. There were 2 heats of 6 semifinalists, once again with the top 3 advancing to the 6-man final.

== Records ==
Prior to the competition, the existing world and Olympic records were as follows.

World record	10.2	Jesse Owens (USA)	Chicago, United States	20 June 1936
World record	10.2	Harold Davis (USA)	Compton, United States	6 June 1941
Olympic record	10.3	(United States) Eddie Tolan	Los Angeles, USA	August 1, 1932
Olympic record	10.3	(United States) Ralph Metcalfe	Los Angeles, USA	August 1, 1932
Olympic record	10.3	(United States) |Jesse Owens	Berlin, Germany	August 2, 1936

Harrison Dillard of the United States matched the Olympic record in the final.

== Schedule ==
All times are British Summer Time (UTC+1).

Date	Time	
Friday, 30 July 1948	15:00; 17:30	Round 1 Round 2
Saturday, 31 July 1948	14:30; 15:45	Semifinals; Finals

== Results ==
=== Round 1 ===
The fastest two runners in each of the twelve heats advanced to the second round. Official hand-timed results are known (and provided in the Official Report) only for the top three in each heat; unofficial auto-timed results are shown as well.

==== Heat 1 ====
Wind: +1.1 m/s

Rank	Athlete	Nation	Time (hand)	Time (automatic)	Notes
1	Barney Ewell	United States	10.5	10.7	Q
2	Alastair McCorquodale	Great Britain	10.5	10.73	Q
3	Leslie Laing	Jamaica	11.0	11.06	
4	Angel García	Cuba	–	11.25	
5	Nestor Jacono	Malta	–	11.54	
–	Bogdan Lipski	Poland	DNS		

==== Heat 2 ====
Wind: +0.3 m/s

Rank	Athlete	Nation	Time (hand)	Time (automatic)	Notes
1	Mel Patton	United States	10.6	10.7	Q
2	Ivan Hausen	Brazil	10.9	10.94	Q
3	James O'Brien	Canada	10.9	11.12	
4	Fernando Lapuente	Argentina	–	11.16	
5	Hector Gosset	Belgium	–	11.50	
6	Gonzalo Rodríguez	Mexico	–	11.97	

==== Heat 3 ====
Wind: +0.4 m/s

Rank	Athlete	Nation	Time (hand)	Time (automatic)	Notes
1	Lloyd La Beach	Panama	10.5	10.7	Q
2	Béla Goldoványi	Hungary	11.0	11.03	Q
3	Frank Mahoney	Bermuda	11.8	11.94	
–	George Rhoden	Jamaica	DNS		
–	Tomás Paquete	Portugal	DNS		
–	John De Saram	Ceylon	DNS		

==== Heat 4 ====
Wind: +1.3 m/s

Rank	Athlete	Nation	Time (hand)	Time (automatic)	Notes
1	Juan López	Uruguay	10.5	10.7	Q
2	Ken Jones	Great Britain	10.6	10.74	Q
3	Jan Meijer	Netherlands	11.0	11.01	
4	Máximo Reyes	Peru	–	11.04	
5	Finnbjörn Þorvaldsson	Iceland	–	11.23	
–	Kyros Marinis	Greece	DNS		

==== Heat 5 ====
Wind: +0.9 m/s

Rank	Athlete	Nation	Time (hand)	Time (automatic)	Notes
1	Harrison Dillard	United States	10.4	10.7	Q
2	Haroldo da Silva	Brazil	10.6	10.94	Q
3	Peter Bloch	Norway	11.1	11.20	
4	Pol Braekman	Belgium	–	11.30	
–	Ricardo Sáenz	Spain	DNS		
–	John O'Donnell	Ireland	DNS		

==== Heat 6 ====
Wind: +1.0 m/s

Rank	Athlete	Nation	Time (hand)	Time (automatic)	Notes
1	McDonald Bailey	Great Britain	10.5	10.7	Q
2	Haukur Clausen	Iceland	11.0	10.89	Q
3	Abram van Heerden	South Africa	11.1	11.01	
4	Carlos Silva	Chile	–	11.08	
5	Bernabe Lovina	Philippines	–	11.32	
6	Stanley Lines	Bermuda	–	11.69	

==== Heat 7 ====
Wind: +0.9 m/s

Rank	Athlete	Nation	Time (hand)	Time (automatic)	Notes
1	John Treloar	Australia	10.5	10.6	Q
2	René Valmy	France	10.8	10.80	Q
3	György Csányi	Hungary	11.1	11.11	
4	Carlos Isaac	Argentina	–	11.24	
5	Sayed Moukhtar	Egypt	–	11.71	
6	Ali Salman	Iraq	–	11.90	
–	Jack Parry	Canada	DNS		

==== Heat 8 ====
Wind: +0.3 m/s

Rank	Athlete	Nation	Time (hand)	Time (automatic)	Notes
1	Rafael Fortún	Cuba	10.7	10.8	Q
2	John Bartram	Australia	10.8	10.89	Q
3	Basil McKenzie	Jamaica	10.8	10.92	
4	Hélio da Silva	Brazil	–	11.09	
5	Jo Zwaan	Netherlands	–	11.09	
–	Duncan White	Ceylon	DNS		

==== Heat 9 ====
Wind: +0.6 m/s

Rank	Athlete	Nation	Time (hand)	Time (automatic)	Notes
1	Morris Curotta	Australia	10.7	10.8	Q
2	Gerardo Bönnhoff	Argentina	10.8	10.83	Q
3	Raúl Mazorra	Cuba	11.1	11.14	
4	Örn Clausen	Iceland	–	11.22	
5	Raşit Öztaş	Turkey	–	11.35	
-	Perry Johnson	Bermuda	DSQ		

==== Heat 10 ====
Wind: NWI

Rank	Athlete	Nation	Time (hand)	Time (automatic)	Notes
1	George Lewis	Trinidad and Tobago	10.8	11.0	Q
2	Ted Haggis	Canada	10.9	11.09	Q
3	Walter Pérez	Uruguay	11.0	11.13	
4	Santiago Ferrando	Peru	–	11.19	
5	Stefanos Petrakis	Greece	–	11.62	
–	Joseph Stéphan	France	DNS		

==== Heat 11 ====
Wind: +3.3 m/s

The excessive tailwind made this heat ineligible for records purposes.

Rank	Athlete	Nation	Time (hand)	Time (automatic)	Notes
1	Isidoor Van De Wiele	Belgium	10.8	11.1	Q
2	Nuno Morais	Portugal	10.9	11.13	Q
3	Alberto Labarthe	Chile	11.0	11.16	
4	Muhammad Sharif Butt	Pakistan	–	11.23	
5	Charles Thompson	Guyana	–		
–	Joe Kelly	Ireland	DNS		
–	Dennis Shore	South Africa	DNS		

==== Heat 12 ====
Wind: +0.9 m/s

Rank	Athlete	Nation	Time (hand)	Time (automatic)	Notes
1	Mario Fayos	Uruguay	11.0	11.1	Q
2	Eric Prabhakar	India	11.0	11.22	Q
3	László Bartha	Hungary	11.1	11.25	
4	Jan Kleyn	Netherlands	–	11.36	
5	Kemal Aksur	Turkey	–	11.45	
6	Maung Sein Pe	Burma	–	11.78	
-	Étienne Bally	France	DNF		

=== Quarterfinals ===
The fastest three runners in each of the four heats advanced to the semifinal round. Official hand-timed results are known (and provided in the Official Report) only for the top three in each heat; unofficial auto-timed results are shown as well.

==== Quarterfinal 1 ====
Wind: +0.2 m/s

Rank	Athlete	Nation	Time (hand)	Time (automatic)	Notes
1	Harrison Dillard	United States	10.4	10.5	Q
2	Juan López	Uruguay	10.6	10.74	Q
3	Ken Jones	Great Britain	10.7	10.75	Q
4	Ivan Hausen	Brazil	–	10.93	
5	Ted Haggis	Canada	–	10.97	
6	António Morais	Portugal	–	11.32	

==== Quarterfinal 2 ====
Wind: 0.0 m/s

Rank	Athlete	Nation	Time (hand)	Time (automatic)	Notes
1	Barney Ewell	United States	10.5	10.7	Q
2	McDonald Bailey	Great Britain	10.6	10.90	Q
3	Morris Curotta	Australia	10.8	10.93	Q
4	George Lewis	Trinidad and Tobago	–	11.04	
5	Béla Goldoványi	Hungary	–	11.11	
6	Haukur Clausen	Iceland	–	11.18	

==== Quarterfinal 3 ====
Wind: +1.5 m/s

Rank	Athlete	Nation	Time (hand)	Time (automatic)	Notes
1	Mel Patton	United States	10.4	10.6	Q
2	Alastair McCorquodale	Great Britain	10.5	10.64	Q
3	John Bartram	Australia	10.6	10.77	Q
4	René Valmy	France	–	10.82	
5	Mario Fayos	Uruguay	–	11.08	
6	Isidoor Van De Wiele	Belgium	–	11.10	

==== Quarterfinal 4 ====
Wind: +1.9 m/s

Rank	Athlete	Nation	Time (hand)	Time (automatic)	Notes
1	Lloyd La Beach	Panama	10.5	10.7	Q
2	John Treloar	Australia	10.5	10.74	Q
3	Rafael Fortún	Cuba	10.6	10.75	Q
4	Haroldo da Silva	Brazil	–	11.04	
5	Gerardo Bönnhoff	Argentina	–	11.09	
6	Eric Prabhakar	India	–	11.26	

=== Semifinals ===
The fastest three runners in each of the two heats advanced to the final round. Official hand-timed results are known (and provided in the Official Report) only for the top three in each heat; unofficial auto-timed results are shown as well.

==== Semifinal 1 ====
Wind: +1.5 m/s

Rank	Athlete	Nation	Time (hand)	Time (automatic)	Notes
1	Harrison Dillard	United States	10.5	10.6	Q
2	Barney Ewell	United States	10.5	10.63	Q
3	Alastair McCorquodale	Great Britain	10.7	10.81	Q
4	John Bartram	Australia	–	10.98	
5	Juan López	Uruguay	–	11.05	
6	Morris Curotta	Australia	–	11.15	

==== Semifinal 2 ====
Wind: +1.3 m/s

Rank	Athlete	Nation	Time (hand)	Time (automatic)	Notes
1	Mel Patton	United States	10.4	10.6	Q
2	Lloyd LaBeach	Panama	10.5	10.62	Q
3	McDonald Bailey	Great Britain	10.6	10.71	Q
4	John Treloar	Australia	–	10.74	
5	Rafael Fortún	Cuba	–	10.82	
6	Ken Jones	Great Britain	–	11.01	

=== Final ===
Patton "got off to a disastrous start and was not a factor." Dillard led the entire way. Official hand-timed results are known (and provided in the Official Report) only for the top three in each heat; unofficial auto-timed results are shown as well.

Wind: +1.6 m/s

Rank	Athlete	Nation	Time (hand)	Time (automatic)	Notes
1st place, gold medalist(s)	Harrison Dillard	United States	10.3	10.5	=OR
2nd place, silver medalist(s)	Barney Ewell	United States	10.4	10.56	
3rd place, bronze medalist(s)	Lloyd LaBeach	Panama	10.6	10.59	
4	Alastair McCorquodale	Great Britain	–	10.61	
5	Mel Patton	United States	–	10.67	
6	McDonald Bailey	Great Britain	–	10.81	
