= Summa Navaratnam =

Sri Lankan athlete and rugby union player (1925–2023)

Personal information
- Nationality: Sri Lankan
- Born: 21 May 1925 Araly, Jaffna, British Ceylon
- Died: 19 October 2023 (aged 98)
- Education: Royal College, Colombo
- Spouses: Rosemary Rogers; Romaine

Sport
- Sport: Athletics; Rugby union
- Event(s): 100 m, 200 m, 4 × 100 metres relay

Sumanthiran Navaratnam (21 May 1925 – 19 October 2023), also known as Sumana Navaratnam or Summa Navaratnam, was a Sri Lankan track and field athlete, rugby union player, coach and business executive. He was regarded as one of the finest sportspeople from Sri Lanka. He was considered as the oldest living Sri Lankan athlete until his death.

== Personal life ==
Sumanthiran Navaratnam was born on 21 May 1925 in Araly, British Ceylon. He was born as the fifth child in his family. His father S. S. Navaratnam was a civil servant.

Navaratnam married Sri Lankan-born British-American best-selling author Rosemary Jansz and the couple had two daughters, Rosanne and Sharon. The couple later divorced and Rosemary moved to London with her daughters in 1960. He was later married to Romaine De Zilva and had two children, Kendall and Nadine. He had 2 grandchildren from Nadine and 2 from Kendall named Kiran and Nikhelle and Thiran and Tristan respectively.

=== Death ===
Navaratnam died on 19 October 2023, at age of 98. His remains were laid at A. F. Raymond Parlour and his funeral was held at Borella cemetery.

== Career ==
Navaratnam established himself as a reputed prominent distinguished sportsman at the Royal College in Colombo where he pursued his primary and secondary education. He gained attention as a school athlete at Royal College at the age of fifteen when he became the youngest Royalist to be awarded the Royal College athletics colours. He also went on to captain the Royal College rugby and athletics teams.

In 1945, for the Indo-Ceylon Dual Athletic Meet, he was chosen to represent Ceylon. He competed in the men's 4 × 100 yards relay event alongside Duncan White, R. E. Kitto and Basil Henricus. He was then overlooked from the Sri Lankan contingent which participated at the 1948 Summer Olympics and in 1952 Summer Olympics due to nepotism with the selection process at that time.

Navaratnam represented Ceylon at the 1950 British Empire Games which was held in Auckland, New Zealand, and competed in the men's 100 yards, men's 220 yards and in men's events. He finished in fifth position in the men's heats 100 yards competition and could not progress to the semi–final. He was also slated to compete in the men's 200 yards event but he did not start and was disqualified. He teamed up with fellow prominent track and field athletes Duncan White, John de Saram and Oscar Wijesinghe in the men's 4 × 110 yards event where Sri Lanka finished in fourth position during the 1950 British Empire Games.

Navaratnam was fondly called "the fastest man in Asia" after clocking at record 10.4 seconds at the India States Olympic Meet which was held in Madras in 1953. It was also regarded as the fastest timing recorded on a grass track on Asian soil. He began his athletics coaching career with Royal College in 1953. He retired from athletics in 1955 and pursued his career as a professional rugby player.

Navaratnam was part of the Ceylon rugby team which played in an unofficial match against the touring British Lions in 1950 where the British Lions defeated Sri Lanka 44–6. He was just one of three local native Sri Lankans along with Leslie Ephraims and Clair Roeloffsz to have been selected to play for the Ceylonese rugby team which was otherwise dubbed as an "all-white" Sri Lankan team. He also captained the Ceylonese Rugby & Football Club and under his captaincy CR & FC won the Clifford Cup in 1954.

Navaratnam was elected as the president of the Ceylon Rugby Football Union in 1972 and was re-elected as the president of the Sri Lanka Rugby Football Union in 1974. He also joined the Royal (Ceylon) Air Force. He went on to become rugby coach of Royal College, Colombo Rugby Football Union and the national team. He also started the Summa Navaratnam Junior Rugby Academy and began coaching children.

Navaratnam pursued a mercantile career as a junior trading executive of Dodwell & Company in Colombo. After the closure of Dodwell, he joined the Stores & Sales Department of Colombo Commercial Company. On his return to Sri Lanka in around 1989, he became general manager of Consolexpo corporation where he served for three years. He became general manager at the Ceylon and Foreign Trades PLC in 1993 and served in the position for about 16 years before his retirement in 2009. He was also appointed to the board of Ceylon and Foreign Trades and its subsidiaries.
