= John Fairgrieve =

British sprinter

Personal information
- Nationality: British
- Born: 18 April 1926 Greenwich, London, England
- Died: 20 July 2014 (aged 88) Slad, Gloucestershire, England
- Height: 180 cm (5 ft 11 in)
- Weight: 76 kg (168 lb)

Sport
- Sport: Athletics
- Event: Sprinting
- Club: University of Cambridge AC; Achilles Club

John Fairgrieve (18 April 1926 – 20 July 2014) was a British sprinter who competed at the 1948 Summer Olympics.

== Biography ==
Fairgrieve was a medical student at Caius College which is why he qualified to join the Achilles Club. Fairgrieve finished second behind McDonald Bailey in the 220 yards event at the 1947 AAA Championships and repeated the feat the following year at the 1948 AAA Championships but this time behind Alistair McCorquodale.

Shortly afterwards he represented the Great Britain team at the 1948 Olympic Games in London, in the men's 200 metres competition.

Fairgrieve also won a Cambridge Blue as a wing-three quarter in rugby. Fairgrieve joined the Royal Medical Corps and served as a major from 1952 to 1954. He later became a senior consultant in vascular surgery at various hospitals, including Middlesex Hospital.

== Competition record ==
Year	Competition	Venue	Position	Event	Notes
Representing Great Britain
1948	Olympics	London, England	4th, QF 3	200 m	
