= Duncan White =

Ceylonese athlete

Major Deshamanya Duncan White MBE, ED
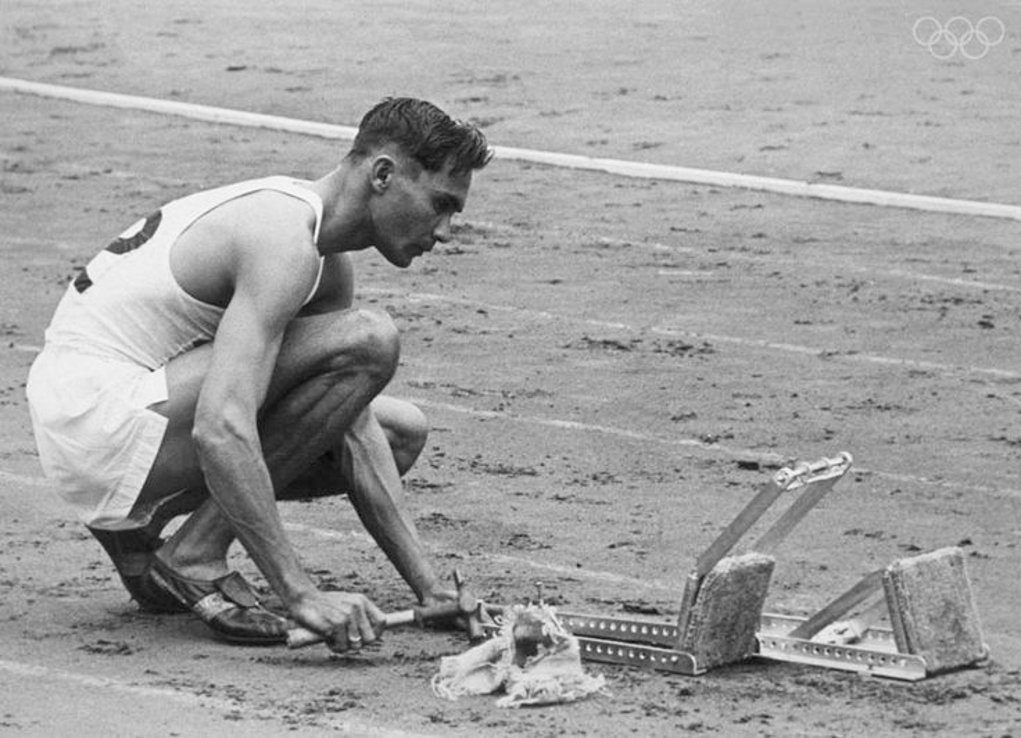

Personal information
- Full name: Duncan M. White
- Born: 1 March 1918 Lathpandura, Kalutara, Basnahira, British Ceylon
- Died: 3 July 1998 (aged 80) Nuneaton, Warwickshire, England
- Education: Trinity College, Kandy
Medal record
Men's athletics
Representing Ceylon
Olympic Games
Silver medal – second place	1948 London	400-metre hurdles
Commonwealth Games
Gold medal – first place	1950 Auckland	440-yard hurdles
- Updated on 22 June 2015
- Military career
- Allegiance: (Dominion of Ceylon) Ceylon
- Branch: Ceylon Defence Force, Ceylon Army
- Units: Ceylon Light Infantry

Major Deshamanya Duncan M. White MBE, ED (1 March 1918 – 3 July 1998) was a Sri Lankan sportsman. He was the first Ceylonese athlete to win an Olympic medal, winning silver in the 400-metre hurdles at the 1948 Summer Olympics in London, England. He was also the second South Asian to have won an Olympic medal in track and field after Norman Pritchard of India, with the third being Susanthika Jayasinghe, another Sri Lankan, who won a silver medal in the 200 metres in 2000.

== Early life ==
White was born on 1 March 1918 in Lathpandura, near Kalutara, in British Ceylon, the second of four children of John Bernard White and Cecilia Hawk. He had three brothers, Frederick A., also an athlete, Stanley Leonard and Douglas Andrew (died 1960). He was educated at Trinity College, Kandy where he was awarded 'Trinity Lion' for athletics; however, this was subsequently withdrawn for disciplinary reasons. He left Trinity in 1937.

== Sporting career ==
He was selected to the college athletics team at the age of 16 in 1934. He became the college athletics captain at the age of 18 in 1936. He took part in 400-yard hurdles at the 1938 British Empire Games but could not deliver the expected performances after suffering a hamstring injury. He was incredibly the only schoolboy to have picked in the Ceylonese contingent for the 1938 British Empire Games. He became champion at national public schools championships, Ceylon championships and India-Ceylon championships. He was chosen to represent Ceylon at the dual meet against India in 1945 (Indo-Ceylon Dual Athletic Meet) where he competed in the men's 4×100 yards relay event alongside Summa Navaratnam, R. E. Kitto and Basil Henricus.

In 1948, he was selected for the team that represented Ceylon at that year's Summer Olympics in London; the country had gained its independence from Britain that year. It was also historically Sri Lanka's first ever appearance at the Olympics. White was also chosen as the flag-bearer for the Dominion of Ceylon during the opening ceremony of the 1948 Summer Olympics. During the 1948 Summer Olympics trials, he surprisingly withdrew from competing in men's 100m and 400m events, a decision which did not go too well with the sports officials and the authorities at the times.

He won silver in the 400-meter hurdles in the final on 31 July 1948, the first Olympic medal for Ceylon. He had trained for only about 3 months before the games while the gold medallist, Roy Cochran of the United States, had trained for about 4 years. Most importantly, White secured Sri Lanka's first ever Olympic medal in the county's debut appearance at the Games. His silver medal achievement came only two days after the opening ceremony of the Olympics. White's time, 51.8 seconds, was only 0.7 seconds behind Cochran; both times bettered the existing Olympic record.

He competed in men's 200m event but was did not progress beyond first round.

After the Olympic victory, White was welcomed at a ceremony at Trinity College and was honoured with the return of his 'Lion'. In his speech at the special assembly, White said: "[A]lthough my victory at the Olympics is prestigious, the 'Lion' makes me feel more honoured than that", and received the 'Lion' with open arms. The Government of Ceylon awarded him a scholarship to Loughborough University, where he won the Inter-University Challenge Shield. He was appointed a Member of the Order of the British Empire (MBE) and awarded the Helms World Trophy as the "Most Outstanding Athlete" in Asia.

In the 1950 British Empire Games in Auckland, New Zealand, White won the 440-yard hurdles, only 0.3 seconds behind the world record. He also became the first Sri Lankan to win a gold medal in any sporting event after the independence of the Dominion of Ceylon. He also teamed up with fellow prominent track and field athletes Summa Navaratnam, John de Saram and Oscar Wijesinghe in the men's 4 × 110 yards event where Ceylon finished at fourth position during the 1950 British Empire Games. He also missed out on another bronze medal chance after placing fourth position in the men's 4 × 400 yards event.

== Military career ==
In 1942, during World War II, White was commissioned as an officer in the Ceylon Light Infantry. He was demobilised in 1947. He later joined the Ceylon Volunteer Force, going on to become a Major and gaining the Efficiency Decoration.

== Academic career ==
After graduating from Loughborough, he returned to Ceylon in 1951 and was appointed the physical education lecturer at the teachers' college in Maharagama. In 1958, the Department of Education appointed him coach of the Sri Lanka Schools Athletic Association. In 1963 he took up a post as lecturer at the University of Nigeria and went on to become a senior lecturer at the University of Ibadan. He eventually settled in Nuneaton, Warwickshire, England, briefly returning to Nigeria as an advisor on sports activities.

The Duncan White Sports Foundation was founded on his 72nd birthday, 1 March 1990, and White presented the first award to Sriyantha Dissanayake on 1 March 1991.

== Personal life and death ==
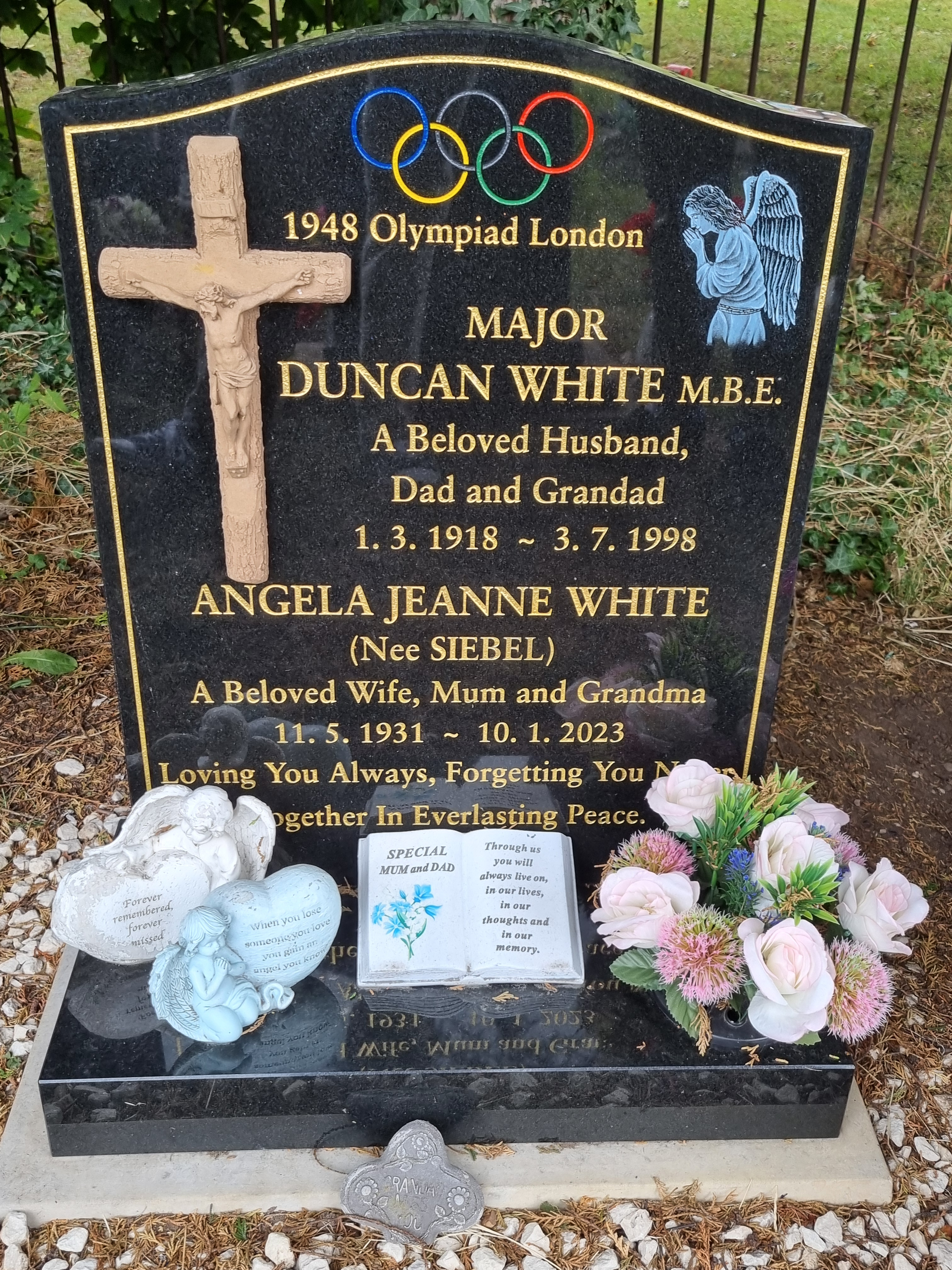
White's memorial headstone in the churchyard at Our Lady of the Angels, Nuneaton

White married Angela Siebel in 1952 and had six children: Maxine, Nita, Christopher, Dan, Marilyn and Fiona. His brother Freddie White was a Sri Lankan legendary field hockey player. He died in 1998 in Nuneaton, despite having said that he intended to migrate with his family to Australia. His wife remained in Nuneaton.

White is the uncle of American actor Bernard White.

== Honours ==
He was conferred with the prestigious Deshamanya award in 1998 by the then Sri Lankan President Chandrika Kumaratunga exactly on the 50th anniversary of his silver medal achievement which was accomplished on 31 July 1948.

- Member of the Order of the British Empire (MBE) in 1949
- Helms World Trophy
- Awarded the title Deshamanya by the Government of Sri Lanka in 1998
- Depicted on a Sri Lankan postage stamp in 1988

== See also ==
- Nagalingam Ethirveerasingam
- Summa Navaratnam
- Sriyantha Dissanayake
- Susanthika Jayasinghe
