= Mary Stacey =

British judge (born 1961)

The Honourable Mrs Justice Stacey

High Court Judge King's Bench Division
- Incumbent
- Assumed office 1 October 2020
- Monarchs: Elizabeth II; Charles III
- Preceded by: Mr Justice Supperstone

Personal details
- Born: 15 May 1961 (age 65) United Kingdom
- Spouse: Stuart Bell (m. 2004–present)
- Children: 2
- Parent: Reverend Nicolas Stacey
- Education: Keble College, Oxford

Dame Mary Elizabeth Stacey, DBE (born 15 May 1961) is a British High Court judge.

== Early life ==
Stacey is the daughter of Rev Nicholas Stacey and was educated at The King's School in Canterbury. She studied English at Keble College, Oxford and graduated with a BA in 1982.

== Legal career ==
Stacey was admitted as a solicitor in 1987, becoming partner and head of equality at Thompsons in 1993 and serving in that role until 1997. She was part-time chair of the employment tribunals from 1997 to 2003, and full-time chair and latterly an employment judge from 2003 to 2014. She was appointed a recorder in 2007, a circuit judge in 2014, and deputy High Court judge in 2018. She was a member of the council of Goldsmiths, University of London from 2008 to 2014.

On 1 October 2020, Stacey was appointed a judge of the High Court, replacing Sir Michael Supperstone who retired, and she was assigned to the Queen's Bench Division. She took the customary damehood in the same year.

On the 12 May 2026, Stacey swore in Rhun ap Iorwerth as First Minister of Wales; ap Iorwerth was the first non-Labour First Minister of Wales, after his party Plaid Cymru won the highest number of seats in the 2026 Senedd election.

== Personal life ==
In 2004, she married Stuart Bell and together they have two sons.
