= Athletics at the 1950 British Empire Games – Men's 4 × 110 yards relay =

Men's 4 × 110 yards relay at the Commonwealth Games

The men's 4 × 110 yards relay event at the 1950 British Empire Games was held on 11 February at the Eden Park in Auckland, New Zealand.

== Results ==
Rank	Nation	Athletes	Time	Notes
1st place, gold medalist(s)	Australia	Scotchy Gordon, David Johnson, John Treloar, Bill De Gruchy	42.2	
2nd place, silver medalist(s)	England	Brian Shenton, Jack Archer, Leslie Lewis, Nick Stacey	42.5	
3rd place, bronze medalist(s)	New Zealand	Arthur Eustace, Clem Parker, Kevin Beardsley, Peter Henderson	42.6	
4	Ceylon	Duncan White, John De Saram, Oscar Wijeyasinghe, Sumana Navaratnam	??.?	
