= António Morais =

António Morais may refer to:

- Nuno Morais (athlete) (1923–1986), Portuguese sprinter
- António Morais (football manager) (1934–1989), Portuguese football forward and manager
