= George Lewis (athlete) =

Trinidad and Tobago sprinter

George Gregory Sebastian Lewis (9 May 1917 – 17 February 2011) was an athlete from Trinidad and Tobago who competed in the sprint events. He was born in Arima.

He was a member of the first Trinidad and Tobago Olympic team at the 1948 Summer Olympics in London, United Kingdom. He competed in both the men's 100 metres and 200 metres. He went out in the first round of the 200 metres, but did qualify for the second round of the 100 metres (by winning his heat), but that was as far as he got.

== Competition record ==
Year	Competition	Venue	Position	Event	Notes
Representing Trinidad and Tobago
1948	Olympics	London, England	4th, QF 2	100 m	
1948	Olympics	London, England	3rd, Heat 8	200 m	22.4
