= Paul Vallé =

British sprinter (1926–2004)

Paul Horace Vallé
Personal information
- Nationality: British
- Born: 31 December 1926 Birth registered in Marylebone, London in January 1927
- Died: 29 December 2004 (aged 77) Wokingham, Berkshire, England

Sport
- Sport: Sprinting
- Event: 200 metres
- Club: British Army; Enfield AC

Paul Vallé (31 December 1926 – 29 December 2004) was a British sprinter. He competed in the men's 200 metres at the 1948 Summer Olympics.

== Competition record ==
Year	Competition	Venue	Position	Event	Notes
Representing Great Britain
1948	Olympics	London, England	6th, SF 1	200 m	
