= Isidoor Van De Wiele =

Belgian sprinter (1924–2010)

Personal information
- Nationality: Belgian
- Born: 30 July 1924 Antwerp, Belgium
- Died: 8 February 2010 (aged 85) Antwerp, Belgium

Sport
- Sport: Sprinting
- Event: 100 metres

Isidoor Van De Wiele (30 July 1924 – 8 February 2010) was a Belgian sprinter. He competed in the men's 100 metres at the 1948 Summer Olympics.

== Competition record ==
Year	Competition	Venue	Position	Event	Notes
Representing Belgium
1948	Olympics	London, England	6th, QF 3	100 m	
