= Abram van Heerden =

South African sprinter (1927–2021)

Personal information
- Nationality: South African
- Born: 7 September 1927
- Died: 3 September 2021 (aged 93)

Sport
- Sport: Sprinting
- Event: 100 metres

Abram van Heerden (7 September 1927 – 3 September 2021) was a South African sprinter. He competed in the men's 100 metres at the 1948 Summer Olympics. He died on 3 September 2021, at the age of 93.

== Competition record ==
| Year | Competition | Venue | Position | Event | Notes |
Representing South Africa
| 1948 | Olympics | London, England | 3rd, Heat 6 | 100 m | 11.1 |
| 1948 | Olympics | London, England | 5th, SF 1 | 200 m | |
