= John Bartram (athlete) =

Australian track and field athlete

Personal information
- Nationality: Australian
- Born: 3 June 1925 Mount Barker, South Australia
- Died: 20 November 2014 (aged 89) Melbourne, Victoria, Australia
- Height: 173 cm (5 ft 8 in)
- Weight: 68 kg (150 lb)

Sport
- Sport: Athletics
- Event: Sprints
- Club: University of Melbourne

John Lavers Bartram (3 June 1925 – 20 November 2014) was an Australian track and field athlete who competed at the 1948 Summer Olympics.

== Biography ==
Bartram finished third behind Alastair McCorquodale in the 220 yards event at the 1948 AAA Championships.

Shortly after the AAAs, Bartram represented Australia at the 1948 London Olympics, competing in the 100 metres, 400 metres and 4 × 100 metres relay.

Bartram served in New Guinea as an able seaman in the Royal Australian Navy during the Second World War.

== Competition record ==
Year	Competition	Venue	Position	Event	Notes
Representing Australia
1948	Olympics	London, England	4th, SF 1	100 m	
1948	Olympics	London, England	4th, Round 2, Heat 3	400 m	49.9
