= Peter Bloch =

Norwegian track and field athlete (1923–1976)

Personal information
- Nationality: Norwegian
- Born: 15 July 1923 Kristiania, Norway
- Died: 20 June 1976 (aged 52)

Sport
- Sport: Athletics
- Event: Sprint
- Club: IF Ready

Peter Bloch (15 July 1923 – 27 June 1976) was a Norwegian track and field athlete. He was born in Kristiania, and represented the sports club IF Ready. He competed in 100 m and 200 m sprint at the 1948 Summer Olympics in London.

== Competition record ==
Year	Competition	Venue	Position	Event	Notes
Representing Norway
1948	Olympics	London, England	3rd, Heat 5	100 m	11.1
1948	Olympics	London, England	5th, Heat 8	200 m	
