= Guillermo Geary =

Argentine sprinter

Guillermo Geary (18 July 1926 – before 2002) was an Argentine sprinter. He represented Argentina at the 1948 Summer Olympics in London, he was entered in the 200 m, he finished third in his heat and failed to advance. His personal best is 21.9 in 1945. Geary died prior to 2002.
