= Basil McKenzie =

Jamaican athlete

Personal information
- Nationality: Jamaican
- Born: 7 October 1926
- Died: 6 June 2016 (aged 89)

Sport
- Sport: Sprinting
- Event: 100 metres

Basil McKenzie (7 October 1926 – 6 June 2016) was a Jamaican sprinter. He competed in the men's 100 metres at the 1948 Summer Olympics.

== Competition record ==
Year	Competition	Venue	Position	Event	Notes
Representing Jamaica
1948	Olympics	London, England	3rd, Heat 8	100 m	10.8
1948	Olympics	London, England	3rd, Heat 5	200 m	22.4
