= Ivan Hausen =

Brazilian sprinter

Ivan Zanoni Hausen (November 2, 1927 – April 21, 2003) was a Brazilian track and field athlete who competed at the 1948 Summer Olympics in the 100 metres, 200 metres and 4 x 100 metres relay.

== Competition record ==
Year	Competition	Venue	Position	Event	Notes
Representing Brazil
1948	Olympics	London, England	4th, QF 1	100 m	
1948	Olympics	London, England	4th, Qtr 4	200 m	22.3
