= Rosemary Rogers =

British-American romance novelist (1932–2019)

- Born: Rosemary Jansz; 7 December 1932; Panadura, British Ceylon (now Sri Lanka)
- Died: 12 November 2019 (aged 86); Monterey, California, U.S.
- Education: University of Ceylon
- Occupation: Novelist
- Spouse(s): Summa Navaratnam, Leroy Rogers, Christopher Kadison
- Children: 4
- Writing career
- Pen name: Rosemary Rogers
- Period: 1974–2019
- Genre: Romance

Rosemary Rogers (née Jansz; 7 December 1932 – 12 November 2019) was a Sri Lankan Burgher best-selling author of historical romance novels. Her first book, Sweet Savage Love, was published in 1974. She was the second romance author, after Kathleen Woodiwiss, to have her novels published in trade paperback format. Both writers found their initial success working with editor Nancy Coffey who was then with Avon Books. Rogers is considered to be one of the founders of the modern historical romance, and many of today's writers cite her writing as one of their biggest influences. She lived in California.

== Biography ==
=== Personal life ===
Rosemary Jansz was born on 7 December 1932 in Panadura, British Ceylon, now Sri Lanka. Her parents, Barbara "Allan" and Cyril Jansz, were Dutch-Portuguese settlers who owned several private schools. Rogers family employed many servants and was sheltered from much of the outside world. She began writing at age eight, and throughout her teens penned many romantic epics in the style of her favorite writers, Sir Walter Scott, Alexandre Dumas, père, and Rafael Sabatini. She was the first woman in her family to work outside the home as a feature writer for a Ceylon newspaper.

After spending three years at the University of Ceylon, Rogers became a reporter, and soon married Summa Navaratnam, a Ceylonese rugby player and track and field star (who played for Ceylon against the 1950 British Lions and who was known as "the fastest man in Asia"). Following a separation from her husband, Rogers moved with their two daughters, Rosanne and Sharon, to London in 1960.

In Europe, she met Leroy Rogers from the United States. They married in his home town, St. Louis, Missouri, and she moved her family to California, where they had two sons, Michael and Adam. The second marriage ended after eight years, and Rogers was left to support herself and four children on her salary as a typist for the Solano County Parks Department. The following year, in 1969, her parents came to live with Rogers. In Solano County, she met Shirlee Busbee, and Rosemary became her friend and mentor.

Her third marriage, in September 1984, was to poet Christopher Kadison, 20 years her junior. It was a short-lived union.

Rogers later made her home in California, where she continued to write until her death.

Rogers died on November 12, 2019, at her home in Monterey, California. She was 86 years old.

=== Writing career ===
Every night for a year, Rogers worked to perfect a manuscript that she had written as a child, rewriting it 24 times. When her teenage daughter found the manuscript in a drawer, she encouraged her mother to send the manuscript to Avon which quickly purchased the novel. That novel, Sweet Savage Love, skyrocketed to the top of bestseller lists, and became one of the most popular historical romances of all time. Her second novel, Dark Fires, sold two million copies in its first three months of release.

Her first three novels sold a combined 10 million copies. The fourth, Wicked Loving Lies sold 3 million copies in its first month of publication.

Rosemary Rogers was one of the first romance authors to extend her scenes into the bedroom. Her novels are often full of violence, and the heroines are usually raped several times, sometimes by the heroes, and sometimes by other men. Her heroines travel to exotic locations and meet important people. In many cases, one or both of the protagonists follows a "riches-to-rags-to-riches" storyline.

Her novel Love Play (1981) features in the Hindi film Khiladi (1992).

== Bibliography ==
=== Legend of Morgan-Challenger series ===
1. Sweet Savage Love (1974)
2. Dark Fires (1975)
3. Wicked Loving Lies (1976)
4. Lost Love, Last Love (1980)
5. Bound by Desire (1988)
6. Savage Desire (2000)

=== Logan Duology series ===
1. An Honorable Man (2002)
2. Return to Me (2003)

=== Stand-alone novels ===
- Wildest Heart (1974)
- The Crowd Pleasers (1978)
- The Insiders (1979)
- Love Play (1981)
- Surrender to Love (1982)
- The Wanton (1985)
- Tea Planter's Bride (1995)
- Dangerous Man (1996)
- Midnight Lady (1997)
- All I Desire (1998)
- In Your Arms (1999)
- A Reckless Encounter (2001)
- Jewel of My Heart (2004)
- Sapphire (2005)
- A Daring Passion (2007)
- Scandalous Deception (2008)
- Bound By Love (2009)
- Scoundrel's Honor (2010)
- Bride for a Night (2011)
