= Sriyantha Dissanayake =

Sri Lankan sprinter (born 1969)

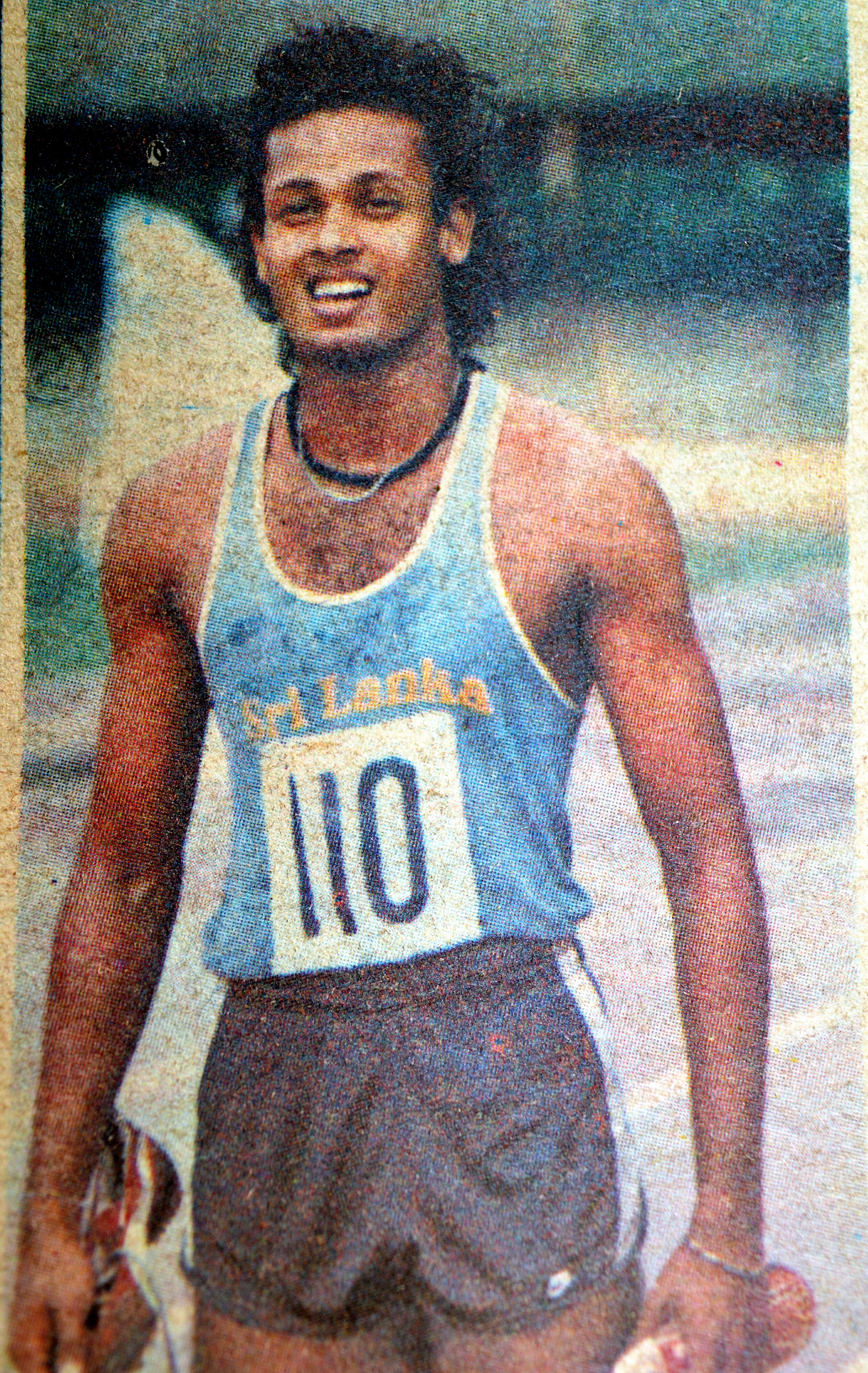
- Born: Sriyantha Subhashan Abeysekara Dissanayake; 3 April 1969 (age 57); Colombo Sri Lanka
- Education: Nalanda College Colombo
- Known for: Champion Sprinter

Deshabandu Sriyantha Dissanayake (born April 3, 1969), also known as Sriyantha Subashan Abeysekara Dissanayake, is a Sri Lankan sprint athlete specializing in the 100 and 200 metres.

== Early life and education ==
Sriyantha was a champion athlete during his school days at Nalanda College Colombo in the late 1980s. He became national champion at the age of eighteen and went on to win additional national and international medals in his career.

== Career ==
Sriyantha Dissanayake won a silver and a bronze medal in the 1990 Asian Games in Beijing. In the 1991 South Asian Games held in Colombo, he won gold medals in both the 100 metre and 200 metre events. In addition, he gained two more gold medals and a silver in the 1993 South Asian Games in Dhaka. Sriyantha also represented Sri Lanka in athletics at the 1992 Summer Olympics held in Barcelona, Spain.

He is the only Sri Lankan athlete to have won a 100-metre medal in the Asian games.

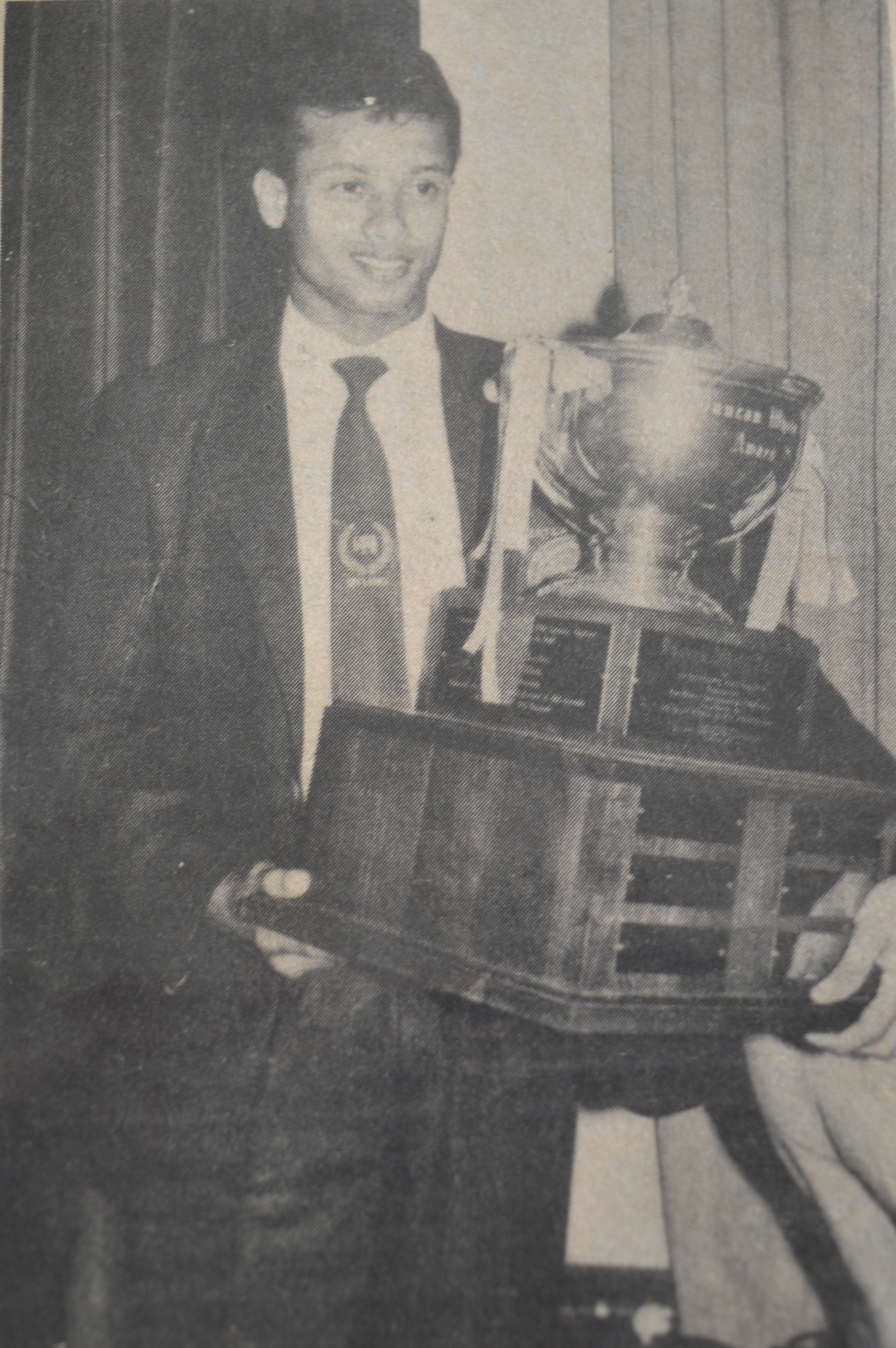
Sriyantha was awarded the first Duncan White award in 1991

== Honors ==
Sriyantha Dissanayake is Sri Lanka's first ever recipient of Duncan White award on 1 March 1991 presented by Duncan White himself.

In 1992, he was awarded the title of Deshabandu for services to his country by the late president R. Premadase.
