= Leslie Ephraims =

Sri Lankan rugby union player

Leslie Ephraims (born 21 January 1927) was a Sri Lankan rugby union player and referee. He was affectionately called as Letcho by his teammates at the Havelock Sports Club during his playing career.

== Personal life ==
He married Daphne on 15 August 1953 and domiciled in Brisbane, Australia after their marriage. He had two brothers Conrad Ephraims and Desmond Ephraims.

== Career ==
He pursued his primary and secondary education at the St. Peter's College, Colombo and he left the school at the age of 16 years in order to join the Fleet of the AIRARM Royal Navy. He captained Sri Lanka Police Rugby team for a duration of five years stretching from 1955 to 1960, but he was granted special permission to represent the Havelock Sports Club, when the Police team did not take part in the Clifford Cup tournaments during those preceding years. Since then, he made himself available as an integral part of the Havelock Sports Club for several years. During his stint with the Havelock Sports Club, he rubbed shoulders with other stalwart players including Bob Sourjah, Vernon Kelly, Ian Labrooy, Fred Aldons, Hugh Aldons, Larry Foenander, S.B. Pilapitiya, Alan Drieberg, Basil Henricus, Eustace Mattysz, Arthur Raymond, Ivor Bartholomeusz, Mervyn Ferdinands, Kenneth Gunewardene, Dicky Ernest and Budgy Metzeling.

He also pursued a crucial role by serving in as a manager at Aitken Spence Shipping in Colombo. He also served in as an Inspector of Police from 1949 to 1960. He alongside his brother Conrad Ephraims represented Ceylon in the All India Tournament in both editions of the tournament in 1950 and 1960. He played alongside other prominent players including the likes of Hugh Aldons, Fred Aldons, Basil Henricus, Eardley McHeyzer and Miles Christoffelsz during Ceylon's participation at the All India Tournaments. Leslie was part of the Ceylon rugby team which played in an unofficial match against the touring British Lions in 1950 where the British Lions defeated Sri Lanka 44–6. He was just one of three local native Sri Lankans along with Summa Navaratnam and Clair Roeloffsz to have been selected to play for the Ceylonese rugby team which was otherwise dubbed as an "all-white" Sri Lankan team.

He migrated to Australia with the intention of permanently settling there in 1965. Following his migration to Australia, he began working as a referee in Second Division matches in Melbourne. Leslie spent majority of his lifetime 40 years in Sri Lanka for over four decades and he was predominantly involved in various aspects of the sports.
