= Peter Henderson (sportsman) =

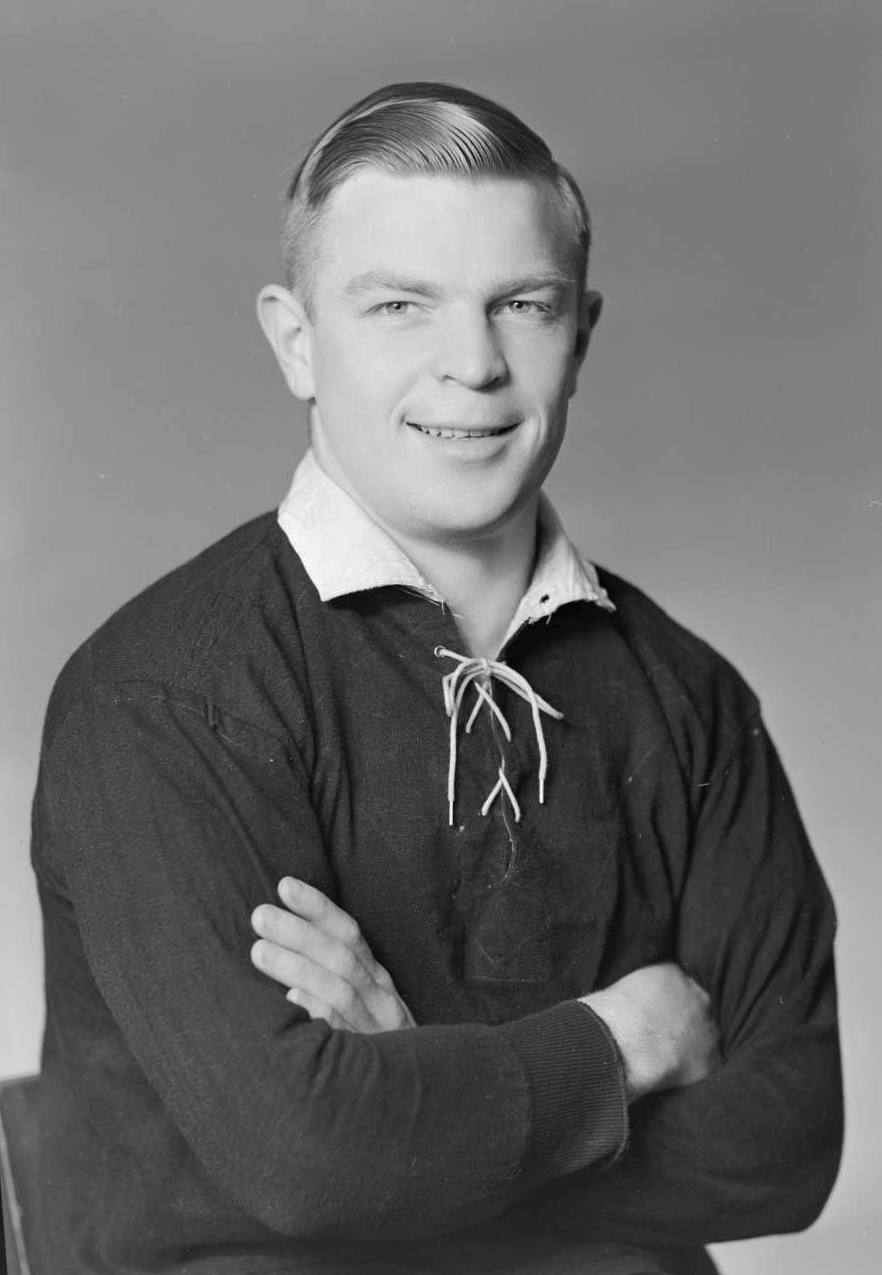
- Henderson in 1948
- Born: 18 April 1926 Gisborne, New Zealand
- Died: 24 November 2014 (aged 88) Tauranga, New Zealand
- Height: 1.72 m (5 ft 8 in)
- Weight: 81 kg (179 lb)
- School: Gisborne Boys' High School

Rugby union career
- Position: Wing
Provincial / State sides
Years	Team	Apps	(Points)
1944–1945	Hawke's Bay		
1946–1950	Wanganui	26	
International career
Years	Team	Apps	(Points)
1949–1950	New Zealand	7	(6)
- Rugby league career

Playing information
- Position: Wing
Club
Years	Team	Pld	T	G	FG	P
1950–1957	Huddersfield					633
Representative
Years	Team	Pld	T	G	FG	P
1953	Other Nationalities					12
- Sports career
- Country: New Zealand
- Sport: Track and field

Sports achievements and titles
- National finals: 100 yards champion (1949)
Medal record
Men's athletics
Representing New Zealand
British Empire Games
Bronze medal – third place	1950 Auckland	4 × 110 yards relay

Peter "Sammy" Henderson (18 April 1926 – 24 November 2014) was a New Zealand rugby union and rugby league footballer. He also competed at the 1950 British Empire Games in Auckland, winning a bronze medal in the 4 × 110 yards men's relay.

== Biography ==
Born in Gisborne and educated at Gisborne Boys' High School, Henderson made his provincial rugby union début for Hawke's Bay in 1944. Moving to Wanganui, where he worked as a dental technician, he played rugby union for the Kaierau Club, and 26 representative matches for Wanganui. He was a member of the ill-fated 1949 All Blacks side, captained by Fred Allen, which lost all four tests on its tour of South Africa. Henderson was top try scorer on the tour, with seven tries.

Henderson excelled in several sports, including sprinting. Following his return from South Africa he had little time to change sports and get into serious sprint training for the 1950 British Empire Games in Auckland. He won a bronze medal as part of the men's 4 × 110 yards relay alongside Kevin Beardsley, Arthur Eustace and Clem Parker. He also competed in the 100 yards where he placed fifth in the final. A medium-sized wing at 1.72 m and 81 kg, Henderson is still credited with being one of the fastest All Blacks of all time, with a time of 9.7 seconds for 100 yards.

Henderson returned to club and representative rugby in Wanganui, playing three tests against the touring British Lions in 1950, and against them for Wanganui. In all, he played 19 matches for the All Blacks, including seven internationals.

Henderson had lost his job while playing in South Africa, so he announced he was headed to England to play in professional rugby league. It was then that the New Zealand Rugby Union banned him from union, a ban which lasted 38 years. He signed with Huddersfield, where he stayed for seven years. He played on the wing in Huddersfield's 15–10 victory over St. Helens in the 1953 Challenge Cup Final during the 1952-53 season at Wembley Stadium, London on Saturday 25 April 1953, in front of a crowd of 89,588. He also played for the Other Nationalities side that won the 1953 tri-nations test series against England and France.

Henderson played on the wing in Huddersfield's 18–8 victory over Batley in the 1952 Yorkshire Cup Final during the 1952–53 season at Headingley, Leeds on Saturday 15 November 1952.
