= Barney Ewell =

American sprinter (1918–1996)

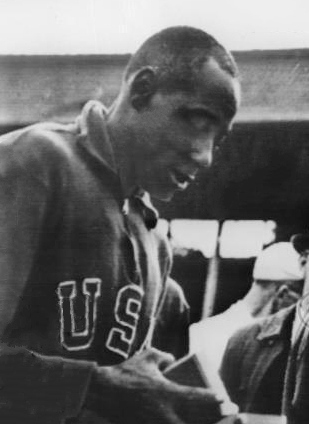
- Ewell in 1948

Personal information
- Full name: Henry Norwood Ewell
- Born: February 25, 1918 Harrisburg, Pennsylvania, U.S.
- Died: April 4, 1996 (aged 78) Lancaster, Pennsylvania, U.S.
- Height: 180 cm (5 ft 11 in)
- Weight: 71 kg (157 lb)

Sport
- Country: United States
- Sport: Athletics
- Events: Sprint, long jump

Achievements and titles
- Personal bests: 100 m – 10.43 (1948); 200 m – 20.8 (1948); LJ – 7.68 m (1942)
Medal record
Men's athletics
Representing the United States
Olympic Games
Gold medal – first place	1948 London	4 × 100 m relay
Silver medal – second place	1948 London	100 metres
Silver medal – second place	1948 London	200 metres

Henry Norwood "Barney" Ewell (February 25, 1918 – April 4, 1996) was an American athlete, and winner of one gold and two silver medals at the 1948 Summer Olympics.

Born into poverty in Harrisburg, Pennsylvania, Ewell was one of the world's leading sprinters of the 1940s. Ewell attended John Piersol McCaskey High School in Lancaster, Pennsylvania. McCaskey High School honored Ewell by dedicating their stadium in his name. Ewell was also inducted into the J.P. McCaskey Athletic Hall of Fame during the school's 50th anniversary year in 1988. Earlier in 1986, he was inducted into the National Track and Field Hall of Fame.

Ewell was the state's greatest high school sprinter-jumper in the mid-1930s, but he first achieved renown while a student at Pennsylvania State University, running the 100 m and 200 m races and winning 12 gold medals and championships in collegiate meets between 1940 and 1942. He also won 11 gold medals in AAU national meets between 1939 and 1948. He was an outstanding long jumper as well, leaping 25 feet 2 inches (7.68 m) in 1942.

He served his country in 1941–1945, returned to the university, and received his B.S. degree in 1947. He surprised everyone by making the 1948 Olympic team, equaling the world record of 10.2 in the 100 m dash at the 1948 AAU championship, which was also the Olympic trials.

At the Olympic Games in London, he thought he had won the 100 m only to learn the victory was given to teammate Harrison Dillard. In the 200 m, Ewell had another close finish and again finished second – this time to teammate Mel Patton. He was added to the 4 × 100 m relay when Ed Conwell became sick and the American team strolled to an easy victory. However, the exchange between Ewell and Lorenzo Wright was ruled out of the zone and the American team was disqualified. After viewing a film of the race, however, officials reversed the ruling, and Ewell finally had his Olympic gold medal.

After the Olympics, Ewell was stripped of his amateur status by Middle Atlantic AAU president Harry S. McDevitt for accepting a furnished house in Lancaster from his fans. Ewell chose not to appeal the ruling. He continued to compete in Australia and New Zealand as a professional.

In 1950, Ewell, ran the fastest ever 100 yards in Australia at the Wangaratta Sports Carnival in a time of 9.5 seconds. Ewell also won the 1950 Wangaratta Gift, run over 130 yards. Several weeks later he won the World Professional Sprint Championships in Wangaratta, Victoria.

He also took part in the Scottish Border games circuit during the summer of 1950. He lived most of those weeks in the town of Bathgate. He won one of the most prestigious sprints on the Border Games circuit at Jedburgh. Running off scratch over 120 yards he ran a time of 11.37 secs. He also took part in a special invitation race in August that same year to mark his time in Scotland (run as a handicap race) over 120 yards at the famous Powderhall venue. Ewell from the scratch mark lost narrowly to Albert C Charles (off 12.5 yds).

Ewell died in Lancaster, Pennsylvania. He was a member of the Omega Psi Phi fraternity.

== Competition record ==
Year	Competition	Venue	Position	Event	Notes
Representing United States
1948	Olympics	London, England	2nd	100 m	10.4
1948	Olympics	London, England	2nd	200 m	21.1

== See also ==
- List of Pennsylvania State University Olympians
