= Jan Kleyn =

Dutch sprinter

Personal information
- Born: 18 April 1925 Asperen, the Netherlands
- Died: 1 April 2009 (aged 83) Oosterhout, the Netherlands

Sport
- Sport: Sprint
- Club: V&L, Den Haag

Jan Kleyn (18 April 1925 – 1 April 2009) was a Dutch sprinter. He competed at the 1948 Summer Olympics in the 100 m event, but failed to reach the final due to an injury.

Kleyn won three national titles in the 100 m and 200 m events in 1947 and 1949. He set two national records in the 4 × 200 m relay and competed in nine international matches. Being an officer of the Dutch Royal Airforce, he won the 100 m and 200 m events at the 1946 and 1947 Inter-Allied Athletics Championships. After retiring from competitions he worked as the sales director of a major insurance company; in parallel, he was chairman of the technical committee of the Dutch track and field federation (1962–1972).
