= Kevin Beardsley =

New Zealand sprinter and school principal

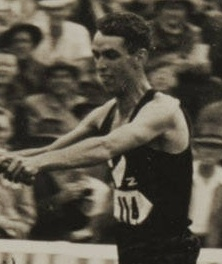
- Beardsley in 1950

Personal information
- Born: Kevin Adrian Beardsley
- Occupation(s): School teacher and principal
- Spouse: Pamela Grace Middleton (m. 1959; died 2018)

Sport
- Country: New Zealand
- Sport: Athletics
Medal record
Men's athletics
Representing New Zealand
British Empire Games
Bronze medal – third place	1950 Auckland	4 × 110 yards relay

Kevin Adrian Beardsley is a former New Zealand sprinter and schoolteacher. He won a bronze medal representing his country at the 1950 British Empire Games, and later became principal of Shirley Intermediate School in Christchurch.

== Early life and family ==
The son of Edward George and Constance Amelia Evelyn Beardsley, Kevin Beardsley was educated at Christchurch Technical High School. He went on to earn a Bachelor of Arts degree at Canterbury University College, graduating on 3 May 1956. In 1959, he married Pamela Grace Middleton at St Luke's Church, Wadestown, in Wellington.

== Athletics ==
Beardsley showed early promise as an athlete, winning the intermediate boys' athletics title at Christchurch Technical High School in 1945. In 1948, he was named a junior Canterbury representative, and the following year he was narrowly beaten by Don Jowett in the junior men's 220 yards race at the annual Canterbury–Wellington interprovincial athletics meet. In January 1950, Beardsley competed in the 100 yards and 220 yards events at the New Zealand Athletics Championships in Napier, where his performances were sufficient to see him selected in the New Zealand athletics team for the 1950 British Empire Games.

At the 1950 British Empire Games, Beardsley won a bronze medal as in the men's 4 × 110 yards relay alongside Arthur Eustace, Peter Henderson and Clem Parker. He also competed in the 100 yards where he placed 6th in his semi-final.

== Teaching career ==
Most of Beardsley's working life was as a teacher in Christchurch and the surrounding area. He was appointed to teach at North New Brighton School in December 1951, and Burnham School in August 1955. He spent 1957 in Cardiff, Wales, as an exchange teacher, and after his return reflected that new schools being opened in Britain were better equipped and had better facilities than many of the best schools in New Zealand. In May 1958, Beardsley was appointed head teacher at Ladbrooks School, and seven years later he became assistant-in-charge at Kirwee Model School.

For a period in the 1970s, Beardsley was principal of Greymouth Intermediate School, and by 1981 he was principal of Shirley Intermediate in Christchurch, until retiring from that position at the end of 1986.

== Later life ==
Since his retirement, Beardsley has written a number of fiction books for adults and children. A self-taught artist, he exhibited his paintings during his time in Greymouth in the 1970s, and subsequently in Christchurch during the 1980s. He also exhibited pottery works with the Canterbury Potters' Association at the CSA Gallery during the 1980s.

Beardsley was predeceased by his wife, Pamela Beardsley, in 2018.
