= Mel Patton =

American sprinter

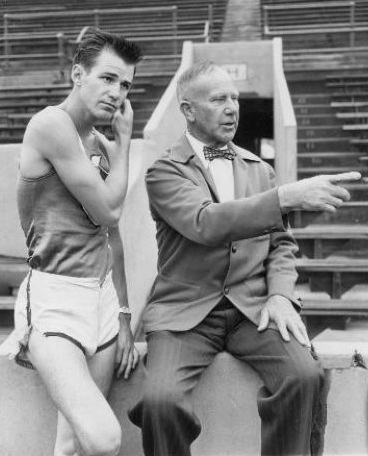
- Patton (left) with coach Dean Cromwell in 1948

Personal information
- Born: November 16, 1924 Los Angeles, California, U.S.
- Died: May 9, 2014 (aged 89) Fallbrook, California, U.S.
- Height: 185 cm (6 ft 1 in)
- Weight: 72 kg (159 lb)

Sport
- Sport: Athletics
- Event: Sprint
- Club: USC Trojans
- Coached by: Dean Cromwell

Achievements and titles
- Personal bests: 100 y - 9.2 (1948) World record 100 m – 10.44 (1948); 200 m – 20.7 (1948); 200 y 20.2 (1949) World record
Medal record
Representing the United States
Olympic Games
Gold medal – first place	1948 London	200 m
Gold medal – first place	1948 London	4 × 100 m relay

Melvin Emery Patton (November 16, 1924 – May 9, 2014) was an American sprinter, who set the world record of 9.2 seconds in the 100-yard dash (91.44 metres) in 1948. He also set a 220 yd world record in 1949 on a straightaway of 20.2, breaking the record held by Jesse Owens.

Patton won two gold medals at the 1948 Summer Olympics. He was ranked first in the world in the 100 m and 200 m events in 1947 and 1949.

== Biography ==
Patton was born in Los Angeles, California, and attended University High School there. Nicknamed Pell Mell in the late 1940s, he made his mark in track and field while a student at the University of Southern California, where he was coached by Dean Cromwell. During his collegiate years, Patton was a member of the Delta-Eta chapter of Kappa Sigma fraternity.

Patton won the NCAA 100-yard dash in 1947 and in 1948 and 1949 completed the 100 and 220 yd sprint double at that same meet. In 1947 he tied the 100 yd dash world record of 9.4, which he lowered it 9.3 the following year. In 1949, he set a 220 yd world record on a straightaway of 20.2, breaking the record held by Jesse Owens.

In the Olympic Trials, he lost to Barney Ewell in the 100 m final, then in the 1948 Summer Olympics placed fifth in the 100 m. He later won two gold medals in the 200 m and the 4 × 100 m relay.

Patton served in the U.S. Navy as a seaman and aviator during World War II. After retiring from competition, he participated in several professional races in Australia. Then he worked as a teacher and athletics coach at Long Beach City College and Wichita State University before becoming an executive in the aerospace and electronics industries. In the 1970s, Patton helped develop the national sports program in Saudi Arabia. He was inducted into the National Track and Field Hall of Fame in 1985, and died in Fallbrook, California on May 9, 2014.

== Competition record ==
Year	Competition	Venue	Position	Event	Notes
Representing United States
1948	Olympics	London, England	5th	100 m	
1948	Olympics	London, England	1st	200 m	21.1
