= Eric Prabhakar =

Indian sprinter

Personal information
- Full name: Eric Rajanicka Prabhakar Philip
- Nationality: Indian
- Born: 23 February 1925 Madras, India
- Died: 10 September 2011 (aged 86) Bangalore, India
- Spouse: Saro Prabhakar

Sport
- Sport: Track and field
- Event: 100m
- Club: University of Oxford AC; Achilles Club

Eric Prabhakar (23 February 1925 – 10 September 2011) was an Indian sprinter. He competed in the men's 100 metres event at the 1948 Summer Olympics, reaching the quarterfinals. He was also a Rhodes Scholar and he subsequently worked for Burmah-Shell Oil and UNESCO as well as being an active sports administrator in India.

== Personal life ==
Eric was born on 23 February 1925, in a family noted for its achievements in sports and in the sphere of education. His brother, E. C. P. Prabhakar, has represented the state in cricket, hockey and tennis and was a top rated bureaucrat.

Eric was married to Saro Prabhakar with who he has three sons, Dev, Sathi, and Jay.

== Career ==
After graduating in economics, Eric got an opportunity to enter the Indian Administrative Service (IAS).

== Competition record ==
Year	Competition	Venue	Position	Event	Notes
Representing India
1948	Olympics	London, England	6th, QF 4	100 m	
