= David Johnson (sprinter) =

Australian sprinter

Personal information
- Born: 1931 Marrickville, Sydney, Australia

Sport
- Sport: Athletics
- Event: Sprinting
Medal record
Representing Australia
British Empire Games
Gold medal – first place	1950 Auckland	4 × 110 y relay
Silver medal – second place	1950 Auckland	220 yards

David Johnson (born 1931) is an Australian former athlete who specialised in sprinting.

Born in Sydney, Johnson studied at Canterbury Boys High School and after the war moved down to Wollongong, where he attended Wollongong High School. In 1949 he ran the fastest ever 100 yard race on record by an Australian schoolboy, clocking 9.7 seconds at the New South Wales All Schools Championships.

Johnson was a NSW state junior champion in both the 100 yards and 220 yards.

In 1950, Johnson competed at the British Empire Games in Auckland and won two medals, a silver in the 220 yard sprint and a gold as a member of the 4 × 110 yards relay team. He was the youngest athlete in the Australian squad.

A few months after returning from Auckland, Johnson was diagnosed with polio. He made a brief comeback in 1951 after recovering but was unable to regain his previous pace and retired at the age of 21.
