= Michael Supperstone =

Sir Michael Supperstone
- Royal coat of arms of the United Kingdom

Justice of the High Court
- In office 2010 – 31 March 2020

Personal details
- Born: Michael Alan Supperstone; 30 March 1950 (age 76)
- Education: Lincoln College, Oxford

Sir Michael Alan Supperstone (born 30 March 1950), styled The Hon. Mr Justice Supperstone, is a former judge of the High Court of England and Wales.

He was educated at St Paul's School, London, and Lincoln College, Oxford.

He was called to the bar at Middle Temple in 1973 and became a bencher there in 1999. He was made a QC in 1991, deputy judge of the High Court from 1998 to 2010, and judge of the High Court of Justice (Queen's Bench Division) since 2010. He received the customary knighthood on appointment. From 2017 he was judge in charge of the Administrative Court. On 31 March 2020, he retired from the High Court.

Supperstone was a member of the barristers' chambers 11 King's Bench Walk. He presided over the long-running case involving The Consulting Association, which admitted blacklisting construction workers over union activities. The proceedings were brought by the blacklisted workers.

== Bibliography ==
- Supperstone, Michael; Goudie, James; Walker, Paul (1992). Judicial Review (1st ed.). Butterworths. ISBN 9780406102607.
- Supperstone, Michael; Knapman, Lynne, eds. (2008). Administrative Court Practice. Oxford University Press. ISBN 9780199217083.
