= Joseph Stéphan =

French sprinter

Joseph Stéphan (22 July 1928 – 1 February 1985) was a French sprinter who competed in the 1948 Summer Olympics.
