= Arthur Eustace =

New Zealand sprinter

Arthur Eustace QSO
Personal information
- Born: Arthur Richard Paton Eustace; 22 April 1926
- Died: 24 April 2018 (aged 92) Waikanae, New Zealand

Sport
- Country: New Zealand
- Sport: Track and field
Medal record
Men's athletics
Representing New Zealand
British Empire Games
Bronze medal – third place	1950 Auckland	4 × 110 yards relay

Arthur Richard Paton Eustace QSO (22 April 1926 – 24 April 2018) was a New Zealand sprinter, athletics coach, and national and international track and field administrator.

== Biography ==
In 1944, Eustace was the athletics champion of Takapuna Grammar School in Auckland. Later that year, he won the 120 yards hurdles at the Auckland inter-secondary schools championships, setting a new record in the process. In 1945, as a member of the Auckland Amateur Athletic and Cycle Club, he won the Auckland Centre junior 120 yards hurdles championship and set a new record. In March that year, he won the national junior 120 yards hurdles championship and set a new record of 15.0 s. In early April, at an invitation athletics competition in Matamata, he set yet another record of 14.2 s, which stood for 15 years.

He won eight New Zealand senior championships from 1946 to 1951, and set records in both the 120 yards and 220 yards hurdles. Three of these were won within a period of 25 minutes in 1948 in Dunedin.

At the 1950 British Empire Games, he won a bronze medal as part of the men's 4 × 110 yards relay alongside Kevin Beardsley, Peter Henderson and Clem Parker. He also competed in the 100 yards, where he placed sixth in the second semi-final.

He lived in Fiji between 1951 and 1954, and represented Fiji at the 1954 British Empire and Commonwealth Games in the 4 x 110 yards relay, in a team of which he was coach and manager.

Eustace was a member of the management committee of the New Zealand Amateur Athletics Association for 28 years and was its president in 1985. He was elected patron of Athletics New Zealand in 2009.

Eustace represented Oceania for 14 years on the IAAF council.

He qualified as a national athletics coach in 1955 and was elected president of the New Zealand Athletics Coaches Association in 1974. He served as the manager of coaching and development of athletics in Oceania from 1974 to 1985. In 2006, Eustace was an inaugural inductee into the New Zealand Athletic Coaches Association Hall of Fame.

Eustace was a technical delegate at the 2000 Sydney Olympics.

In the 1996 New Year Honours, Eustace was appointed a Companion of the Queen's Service Order for community service. At the 2012 Westpac Halberg Awards, Eustace received the Lifetime Achievement Award, for outstanding service to sport.

Eustace died at his home in Waikanae on 24 April 2018.
