= Don Pettie =

Canadian sprinter (1927–2017)

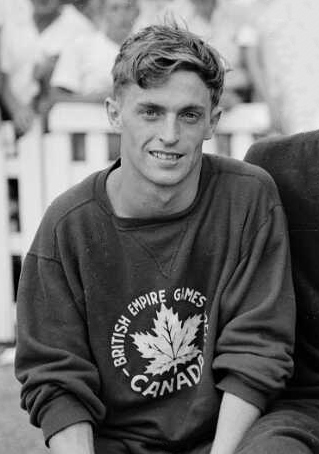
- Pettie at the 1950 British Empire Games

Personal information
- Born: 28 March 1927 Calgary, Alberta, Canada
- Died: 12 August 2017 (aged 90) Calgary, Alberta, Canada
- Education: Drake University

Sport
- Sport: Athletics
- Event: Sprint

Achievements and titles
- Personal bests: 100 m – 10.9 (1948); 200 m – 21.4 (1950)
Medal record
Representing Canada
British Empire Games
| Bronze medal – third place | 1950 Auckland | 100 yards |

Donald Alan Pettie (28 March 1927 – 12 August 2017) was a Canadian sprinter. He competed in the 4 ×100 metres relay and in the 200 metres at the 1948 Summer Olympics and placed fifth in the relay. In 1949 he won the national title over 100 and 200 metres. At the 1950 British Empire Games he won a bronze medal in the 100 yards and placed fifth in the 220 yards and the 4×400 yards relay. He retired from competitions in 1950 and until 1992 worked in the oil industry. In 2009 he was named a Drake Relay Athlete of the Century.

== Competition record ==
| Year | Competition | Venue | Position | Event | Notes |
Representing Canada
| 1948 | Olympics | London, England | 3rd, Heat 12 | 200 m | 22.0 |
