= Nuno Morais (athlete) =

Portuguese athlete

Personal information
- Nationality: Portuguese
- Born: 25 April 1923
- Died: 2 September 1986 (aged 63)

Sport
- Sport: Sprinting
- Event: 100 metres

Nuno Morais (25 April 1923 – 2 September 1986) was a Portuguese sprinter. He competed in the men's 100 metres at the 1948 Summer Olympics.

== Competition record ==
Year	Competition	Venue	Position	Event	Notes
Representing Portugal
1948	Olympics	London, England	6th, QF 1	100 m	
