= Clem Parker =

New Zealand sprinter (1926–2017)

Personal information
- Born: Clement Parker; 31 December 1926 Hastings, New Zealand
- Died: 6 November 2017 (aged 90) Hamilton, New Zealand
- Spouse: Moira Kathleen White (m. 1951; died 2017)
- Relative: Dorothea Parker (sister)

Sport
- Country: New Zealand
- Sport: Track and field

Achievements and titles
- National finals: 100 yards champion (1950)
Medal record
Men's athletics
Representing New Zealand
British Empire Games
Bronze medal – third place	1950 Auckland	4 × 110 yards relay

Clement Parker (31 December 1926 – 6 November 2017) was a New Zealand sprinter.

At the 1950 British Empire Games he won the bronze medal as part of the men's 4 × 110 yards relay alongside Kevin Beardsley, Arthur Eustace and Peter Henderson. He also competed in the 100 and 200 yards where he placed 6th in each of the finals.

His sister Dorothea Parker also won a medal at the 1950 British Empire Games.
