= Nicolas Stacey =

British sprinter, priest, and activist (1927–2017)

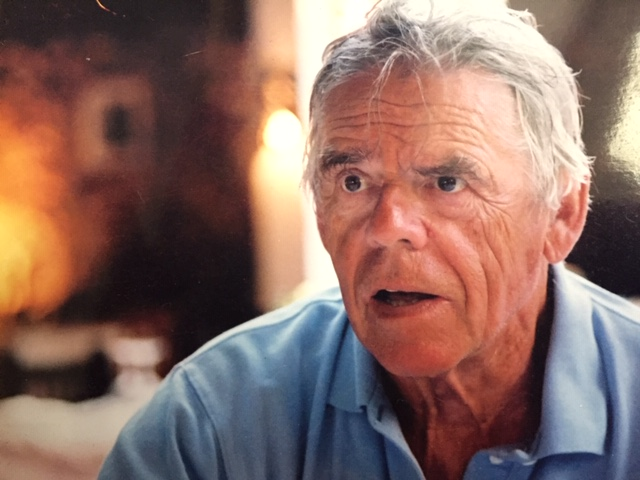

Personal information
- Nationality: British (English)
- Born: 27 November 1927 London, England
- Died: 8 May 2017 (aged 89) Canterbury, England
- Height: 183 cm (6 ft 0 in)
- Weight: 77 kg (170 lb)
- Children: Dame Mary Stacey

Sport
- Sport: Athletics
- Event: Sprints/400m
- Club: University of Oxford AC; Achilles Club
Medal record
Athletics
Representing England
British Empire Games
Silver medal – second place	1950 Auckland	4 x 110 yard relay

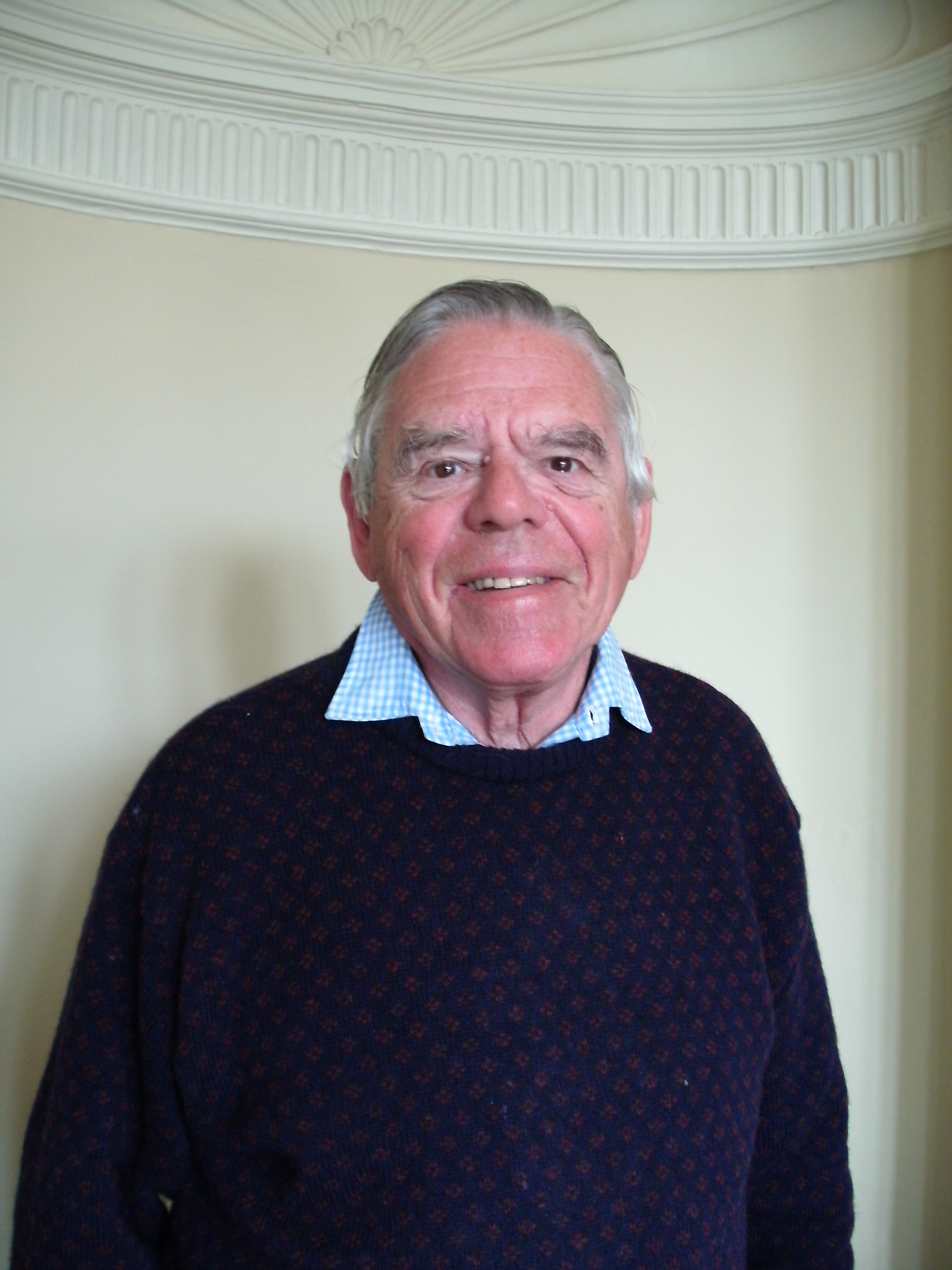
Nicolas Stacey 2009

Reverend Nicolas David Stacey (27 November 1927 – 8 May 2017) was a priest of the Church of England and social activist. He was Rector of Woolwich in the 1960s, and Director of Social Services for Kent County Council from 1974 to 1985.

== Early life ==
Nick Stacey was born 27 November 1927. He was educated at the Royal Naval College, Dartmouth, and saw service on HMS Anson in the last months of the Second World War. He participated in the liberation of Hong Kong, and witnessed the devastation of Hiroshima shortly after VJ Day. He resigned his commission in the Navy to read Modern History at St Edmund Hall, Oxford, and then trained for the priesthood at Cuddesdon Theological College. During this time he represented his service, university and country in athletics, being president of the Oxford University Athletics Club, and participated in the British Empire Games (1950), winning a silver medal. and the 1952 Olympic Games. He was a semi-finalist in the 200 metres and a finalist in the 4×400 metres relay.

Ordained in 1953 he served his title at St Mark's, Portsea, Portsmouth, under Christopher Pepys, later Bishop of Buckingham. In 1958 he moved to become Domestic Chaplain (personal assistant) to the Bishop of Birmingham, Dr Leonard Wilson. During his time in Birmingham,he began to receive national attention, after founding and editing a tabloid church newspaper, the Birmingham Christian News, which gained a reputation for comparatively lively journalism and a more sensationalist approach to church news. This was a deliberate policy on Stacey's part, and became characteristic of his ministry. He said "We want to be a platform for the prophetic voices of the country. We want to show that the Christian faith is relevant to twentieth-century living and that the Church is concerned with all the activities of man".

== The "Woolwich Project" ==
In 1960 he was invited by Mervyn Stockwood, Bishop of Southwark, to become rector of Woolwich, where he served for eight years. Contemporary accounts describe the parish at that time as comprising three Church of England churches with relatively small congregations. The area faced challenges associated with social housing, and the level of religious observance in Woolwich were reported to be declining more rapidly than the national average.

During his tenure, Stacey introduced a range of reforms. He assembled a team of ministers drawn from different denominations, and closed one of the three churches. He altered the eighteenth-century parish church of St Mary Magdalen, including the enclosure of galleries and side aisles to create offices, meeting rooms, and counselling spaces. A discothèque was built in the crypt, and the youth club operated at the church reportedly attracted significant local participation, including referrals from probation officers. A coffee bar was also opened in the gallery. It was reported that within four years 1500 people a week were passing through the church facilities.

Stacey was not without his detractors. His abrupt style and ability to garner publicity for his project alienated some of his fellow clergy in the diocese:

If Stacey thinks he can build the Kingdom of God by frying eggs on the altar and percolating coffee in the organ pipe he should think again.

But Stacey didn't neglect the traditional model of parochial ministry. An intensive parish visiting programme was begun, with the large clergy team visiting or attempting to visit every household in the parish systematically. An adaptation of the Prayer Book baptism service was devised in an attempt to be more welcoming. Stacey fostered links with the civic bodies of the area, and encouraged links with the Royal Arsenal.

Despite all this effort, after four years Stacey judged the project to have been a failure. Regular worshippers had increased from fifty to one hundred, but most of these did not live in the parish. Stacey's reaction was characteristic. He wrote two articles for The Observer in December 1964 and May 1965. In the articles he described his "mission's failure" and recommendations for the survival of the Church of England. The articles caused a storm of publicity, and were not at all well received. Bryan Wilson, the eminent sociologist of religion, described the latter article as not "how the Church could survive" but rather "how the Church might surrender". Eric Mascall called Stacey a "gimmick manqué".

Undeterred, Stacey restructured his ministry team. Most of the clergy sought secular employment, working in the parish in their spare time and at weekends. Stacey himself earned most of his income through journalism. However, after another three years he realised that he was ready for a change from Woolwich parish, and, realising that the Church was unlikely to offer him another post, he began to seek secular employment.

== Oxfam and Social Services ==
In 1968 Stacey was appointed Deputy Director of Oxfam, a job he stayed in for only 2 years. He felt that Oxfam was well placed to do what Bob Geldof attempted 30 years later - lead a national campaign to Make Poverty History. This would have involved educating the public on the enormity and complexity of relieving poverty in the Third World which could only be done by massive British government aid. Oxfam's trustees were afraid it would lose its charitable status and Stacey resigned. As in the Church he was ahead of his time.

Stacey's next move was to become in 1971 the first Director of Social Services for the 300,000-strong population of the London Borough of Ealing. Social Service departments had been created as a result of the Seebohm report which brought together in one local government department children's and young people's services, the mentally and physically handicapped, the mentally ill and elderly to create a 'cradle to grave' caring service.

It was a controversial appointment because Stacey was neither a social worker nor a local government officer. In spite of this three years later he was appointed to be Kent's Director of Social Services, one of the three largest departments in the country, with 6,000 staff caring for 50,000 clients serving a population of 1.5 million. The publication 'A Study in Leadership: Nick Stacey and Kent Social Services' written by Don Brand, published in January 2009, explains, 'Stacey inherited a department needing extensive modernisation in an authority with little appetite for change. Seen from outside, Kent was a dead-beat place. It wasn't somewhere you went to work, it wasn't cutting edge....the place was absolutely dire and in many ways it was quite brave of Nick to go there.' By the time Stacey left in 1985 he had transformed Kent into one of the leading departments in the country with a national reputation for imaginative innovation and a strong influence on government policy.

He was responsible for pioneering from scratch two projects which were to become national government policy. The first was to introduce Professional Fostering for delinquent and troubled teenagers. Hitherto pre-puberty children in care were mainly fostered while teenagers were placed in institutions. Stacey was convinced that putting a lot of unloved, insecure, often delinquent and troubled teenagers together exacerbated their problems while the institutionsto which they were sent became springboards for borstal and prison.

Carefully selected and well supported professional foster parents were paid a fee, and a married couple fostering two children could earn the equivalent of a teacher's annual salary for what was widely regarded as a demanding job. Foster care fees were reported to be about half the cost of keeping a child in an institution. The Professional Fostering was later introduced nationwide and was described as a success.

The second scheme, monitored from the start by the University of Kent, was Community Care for the Elderly. Instead of sending old people unable to care for themselves into old people's homes, each old person was individually assessed to see what services they would require in order to stay in their own homes. A package of care tailored to each old person's particular needs - from getting them up in the morning to putting them to bed at night and providing a daily meal - was provided by social work staff. Very often it was cheaper than the cost of care in an old people's home.

== Stacey's Legacy ==
His autobiography, Who Cares, written shortly after he left the stipendiary ministry, is a description of his experiences in the Church of England. Although out of print, it is occasionally available through second-hand book dealers, and is essential reading for historians of the Church of England in the twentieth century.

The Woolwich Project was probably the best last chance for a traditional, intensive model of parochial ministry. Much of what Stacey pioneered has become commonplace in the Church of England (for example, his fostering of ecumenical teams and shared premises), and some of his more radical proposals (such as nine out of ten clergy working in non-stipendiary ministry) may yet be required by the Church.

Summing up in his booklet on Nick Stacey's role in Social Services Don Brand says: 'Leading and managing social services requires men and women of the highest calibre with vision, intelligence and judgement. His success shows how imaginative leadership can overcome the constraints of bureaucracy.' Stacey showed the way for charismatic and dedicated people to follow in a demanding and fulfilling job.

Stacey claims his work as a Director of Social Services gave him a greater opportunity of Building the Kingdom of God than he would have had if he had stayed in the ecclesiastical structures. He said: 'I accept that I have failed to have much influence on the Church but I am grateful to God to have had an opportunity to have had some influence in what has often been described as the Secular Church.'

In 2005 he was awarded the Cross of St Augustine, given personally by the Archbishop of Canterbury "for outstanding service within the Church of England whether centrally or in the dioceses, or the Anglican Communion as a whole, and to those who have contributed to advancing relations between the various Christian communions and churches."

== Kendall House ==
In 2006 Stacey was interviewed as part of the British Library's oral history series, National Life Stories, under the title "Pioneers of Charity and Social Welfare". In the interview about his role in the development of Social Care in Britain, Stacey revealed that during his time as Director of Social Services he did not uncover abuse that warranted referral to the police. A few weeks after Stacey died in 2017 the BBC's Religious Affairs correspondent, Callum May, wrote an article on the BBC website that linked those remarks with Kendall House, a Church of England-run children's home in Gravesend where vulnerable girls were routinely medicated, restrained and abused. Among the residents was campaigner Teresa Cooper, whose persistence across three decades led to the Kendall House review, which finally brought the full story of abuse to light. The independent review's 2016 report found the institution to have inadequate governance and oversight, made 19 recommendations for the Dioceses of Canterbury and Rochester, and concluded that they should apologise to the women who had suffered abuse. The BBC article implied that Stacey, a Church of England parish priest in the 1960s, oversaw Kendall House and must have known of the abuse and failed to report it.

A complaint to the BBC was upheld and the BBC accepted that as a Church of England home Kendall House was not overseen by Stacey, that he was not responsible for Kendall House and that it was not "unavoidable that Stacey would have known what was going on but failed to report it". The Church Times, which also ran the story, published letters clarifying the mistake. The revelations of abuse at Kendall House served to underline the importance of Stacey's pioneering role in the introduction of Professional Fostering. Professional Fostering removed vulnerable children from institutions such as Kendall House and placed them in family homes. The initiative was subsequently introduced by Social Services throughout the UK.

Documents held on Kendall House show Rev. Stacey was directly involved there and had direct contact with the acting GP and social workers involved with Kendall House.

== Personal life ==
Stacey's daughter Dame Mary Stacey was appointed a High Court judge in 2020.

== Sources ==
- Nicolas Stacey, Who Cares (London: Anthony Blond, 1971) ISBN 0-340-18477-9
- Trevor Beeson, Rebels & Reformers, (London: SCM Press, 1999) ISBN 0-334-02792-6
- Mark Chapman, 'Theology in the Public Arena: The case of South Bank Religion' in Jane Garnett, et al., (eds.), Redefining Christian Britain: Post 1945 Perspectives, (London: SCM Press, 2007) ISBN 0-334-04092-2
- Michael Hinton, The Anglican Parochial Clergy: A Celebration, (London: SCM Press, 1994) ISBN 0-334-02672-5
- Don Brand, A Study in Leadership, Nick Stacey and Kent Social Services, (Brand Book, PO Box 254, Selling, Faversham, Kent ME13 3AG)
