= John Treloar (athlete) =

Australian sprinter

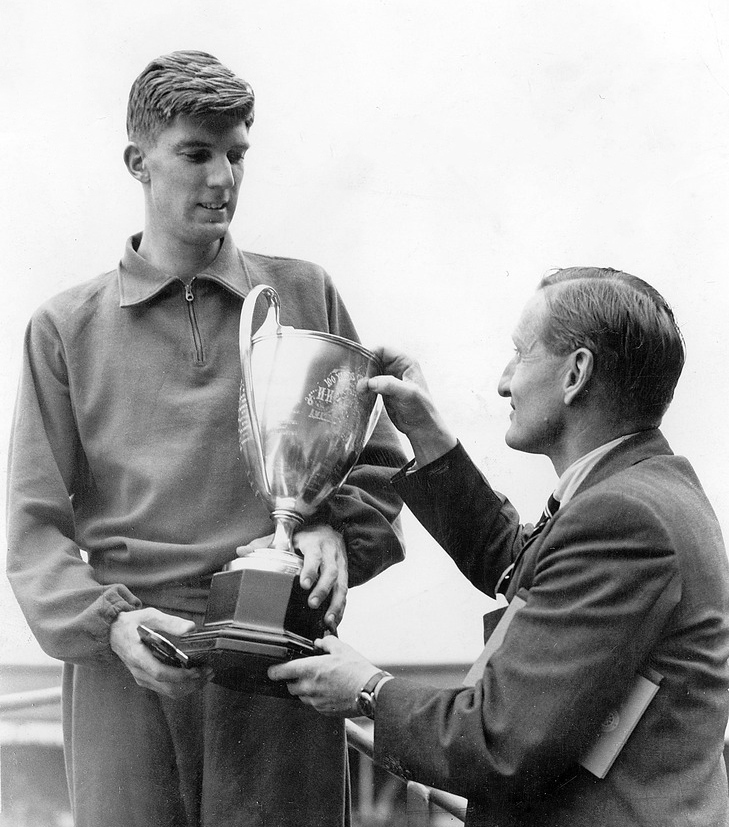
- Treloar receives a prize from Lord Burghley in 1948

Personal information
- Born: 19 January 1928 Lindfield, New South Wales, Australia
- Died: 23 July 2012 (aged 84) Taren Point, New South Wales, Australia
- Education: North Sydney Boys High School; Wesley College; University of Sydney

Sport
- Sport: Athletics
- Events: 100 m, 200 m

Achievements and titles
- Personal bests: 100 m – 10.5 (1948); 200 m – 21.1y (1946)
Medal record
Men's athletics
Representing Australia
British Empire Games
Gold medal – first place	1950 Auckland	100 yards
Gold medal – first place	1950 Auckland	220 yards
Gold medal – first place	1950 Auckland	4×110 yards relay

John Francis Treloar AM (19 January 1928 – 23 July 2012) was a track and field athlete, who is considered to have been one of Australia's greatest male sprinters. He was ranked as one of the world's fastest men between 1947 and 1952. A triple gold medallist at the 1950 British Empire Games, Treloar made the 100 m final at the 1952 Summer Olympics finishing sixth – just 0.1 s behind the winner – in the closest finish in Olympic history.

In his career, Treloar won a total of six Australian championships at 100 or 220 yards.

Treloar died on 23 July 2012. His son notified the Australian Olympic Committee of his father's death on 23 July; in this notification he stated that "Dad passed away exactly as he ran. Quickly."

== Awards and other honours ==
In 2000, Treloar was awarded the Australian Sports Medal for "(o)utstanding service as an Olympic athlete and since then as an administrator and event organiser."

Treloar was appointed a Member of the Order of Australia (AM) in 2001.

In 2011, his old school, North Sydney Boys High School named their recently refurbished gymnasium in his honour.

Following Treloar's death, Prime Minister Julia Gillard and Minister for Sport Kate Lundy issued a joint press release which stated that Treloar "will always be remembered as a remarkable trailblazer for athletics in this country".

Athletics NSW named its annual interclub competition in honour of John Treloar. The Treloar shield runs every year between October and December

Treloar's funeral was later held at his old school, North Sydney Boys High School by request of his family.

== Competition record ==
Year	Competition	Venue	Position	Event	Notes
Representing Australia
1948	Olympics	London, England	4th, SF 2	100 m	
1948	Olympics	London, England	4th, SF 2	200 m	
1952	Olympics	Helsinki, Finland	6th	100 m	10.5/10.91
