= Athletics at the 1955 Mediterranean Games =

1955 Athletics at the Mediterranean Games

- Dates: 18–24 July
- Host city: (Spain) Barcelona
- Venue: Estadi Olímpic de Montjuïc
- Events: 24
- Participation: 175 athletes from 7 nations

Athletics at the 1955 Mediterranean Games were held in Barcelona, Spain and took place between 18 July and 24 July.

== Medal table ==
* Host nation (Spain)

Rank	Nation	Gold	Silver	Bronze	Total
1	France	10	10	8	28
2	Italy	9	3	5	17
3	Turkey	2	2	2	6
4	Greece	1	4	4	9
5	Egypt	1	4	2	7
6	Spain*	1	1	3	5
Totals (6 entries)		24	24	24	72

== Medal summary ==
=== Track ===
Event	Gold		Silver		Bronze	
100 metres	Luigi Gnocchi (ITA)	10.9 =GR	Alain David (FRA)	11.0	Sergio D'Asnasch (ITA)	11.0
200 metres	Luigi Gnocchi (ITA)	21.6 GR	Vincenzo Lombardo (ITA)	21.7	Wolfango Montanari (ITA)	21.7
400 metres	Jacques Degats (FRA)	47.3 GR	Pierre Haarhoff (FRA)	47.5	Vincenzo Lombardo (ITA)	47.8
800 metres	Ekrem Koçak (TUR)	1:50.0 GR	René Djian (FRA)	1:51.1	Evangelos Depastas (GRE)	1:52.4
1500 metres	Ekrem Koçak (TUR)	3:50.2 GR	Cahit Önel (TUR)	3:52.2	Antoine Vincendon (FRA)	3:53.2
5000 metres	Alain Mimoun (FRA)	14:27.6 GR	Osman Coşgül (TUR)	14:39.0	Jean Carron (FRA)	14:40.4
10,000 metres	Alain Mimoun (FRA)	30:23.6 GR	Luis García (ESP)	31:32.8	Raymond Mahaut (FRA)	31:48.2
Marathon	Abdul Herin (EGY)	2:50:35 GR	Ali Hamid (EGY)	2:53.57	Erturan Haydar (TUR)	2:58.07
110 metres hurdles	Philippe Candau (FRA)	14.9 GR	Jacques Dohen (FRA)	15.2	Jean-Claude Bernard (FRA)	15.4
400 metres hurdles	Guy Cury (FRA)	52.4 GR	Robert Bart (FRA)	52.8	Armando Filiput (ITA)	53.4
3000 m steeplechase	Georgios Papavasileiou (GRE)	9:20.6 GR	Julien Soucours (FRA)	9:23.6	José Teixeira (ESP)	9:26.8
4 x 100 metres relay	Italy; Giovanni Ghiselli; Sergio D'Asnasch; Wolfango Montanari; Luigi Gnocchi	41.0 GR	Greece; Nikolaos Georgopoulos; Dimitrios Kipouros; Stefanos Petrakis; Konstantinos Tsalamanios	42.6	Egypt; Mustafa Marhoum; Emad El-Din Shafei; Fawzi Chaaban; Yussef Zein El Abdin	42.8
4 x 400 metres relay	France; Jacques Degats; Pierre Haarhoff; René Galland; Jean-Paul Martin du Gard	3:12.8 GR	Italy; Luigi Grossi; Mario Paoletti; Vincenzo Lombardo; Baldassare Porto	3:14.4	Egypt; Hassan Ahmed Ragab; Fadl El Sayed; Nashat El Kholi; Farouk Tadros	3:16.2
10 km walk	Pino Dordoni (ITA)	48:21.8 GR	Roland Griset (FRA)	48:44.2	Louis Chevalier (FRA)	49:47.4
50 km walk	Abdon Pamich (ITA)	5:03:33	Roger Chaylat (FRA)	5:20:07	Francisco Villoldo (ESP)	5:36:07

=== Field ===
Event	Gold		Silver		Bronze	
High jump	Maurice Fournier (FRA)	1.98 m	Papagallo Thiam (FRA)	1.98 m	Çetin Şahiner (TUR)	1.90 m
Pole vault	Giulio Chiesa (ITA)	4.28 m GR	Georgios Roubanis (GRE)	4.25 m	Victor Sillon (FRA)	4.20 m
Long jump	Luigi Ulivelli (ITA)	7.17 m	Emad El Din Shafei (EGY)	7.11 m	René Cucuat (FRA)	7.10 m
Triple jump	Éric Battista (FRA)	14.93 m GR	Fawzi Chaaban (EGY)	14.59 m	Konstantinos Sfikas (GRE)	14.58 m
Shot put	Raymond Thomas (FRA)	15.70 m GR	Georgios Tsakanikas (GRE)	15.49 m	Silvano Meconi (ITA)	15.35 m
Discus throw	Adolfo Consolini (ITA)	52.81 m GR	Antonios Kounadis (GRE)	47.23 m	Konstantinos Giataganas (GRE)	45.63 m
Hammer throw	Teseo Taddia (ITA)	55.14 m GR	Guy Husson (FRA)	54.31 m	Dimitrios Boulboutzis (GRE)	48.23 m
Javelin throw	Michel Macquet (FRA)	69.00 m GR	Francesco Ziggiotti (ITA)	66.22 m	Pedro Apellániz (ESP)	62.64 m
Decathlon	Bernardino Adarraga (ESP)	5693 pts GR	Mohamed Saïd Zaki (EGY)	5633 pts	Robert Vaussenat (FRA)	5262 pts

== Participating nations ==
- Egypt (15)
- France (57)
- Greece (22)
- Italy (20)
- Lebanon (1)
- Spain (49)
- Turkey (11)

== Results ==
=== 100 meters ===
Heats – 20 July

Rank	Heat	Name	Nationality	Time	Notes
1	1	Sergio D'Asnasch	Italy	10.9	Q
2	1	Jean Meunier	France	11.1	Q
3	1	Stefanos Petrakis	Greece	11.2	Q
4	1	Melanio Asensio	Spain	11.5	Q
1	2	Alain David	France	10.8	Q
2	2	Emad El-Din Shafei	Egypt	11.1	Q
3	2	Giovanni Ghiselli	Italy	11.2	Q
4	2	Luis Casar	Spain	11.6	Q
1	3	Luigi Gnocchi	Italy	11.0	Q
2	3	René Bonino	France	11.2	Q
3	3	Michail Tsolakis	Greece	11.3	Q
4	3	Youssef Zein El Abdin	Egypt	11.3	Q

Semifinals – 20 July

Rank	Heat	Name	Nationality	Time	Notes
1	1	Alain David	France	10.9	Q
2	1	Luigi Gnocchi	Italy	10.9	Q
3	1	Giovanni Ghiselli	Italy	11.0	Q
4	1	Jean Meunier	France	11.3	
5	1	Emad El-Din Shafei	Egypt	11.5	
6	1	Melanio Asensio	Spain	11.6	
1	2	René Bonino	France	11.0	Q
2	2	Sergio D'Asnasch	Italy	11.1	Q
3	2	Michail Tsolakis	Greece	11.1	Q
4	2	Youssef Zein El Abdin	Egypt	11.3	
5	2	Stefanos Petrakis	Greece	11.4	
6	2	Luis Casar	Spain	11.7	

Final – 21 July

Rank	Name	Nationality	Time	Notes
1st place, gold medalist(s)	Luigi Gnocchi	Italy	10.9	=GR
2nd place, silver medalist(s)	Alain David	France	11.0	
3rd place, bronze medalist(s)	Sergio D'Asnasch	Italy	11.0	
4	René Bonino	France	11.1	
5	Giovanni Ghiselli	Italy	11.2	
6	Michail Tsolakis	Greece	11.3	

=== 200 meters ===
Heats – 22 July

Rank	Heat	Name	Nationality	Time	Notes
1	1	Vincenzo Lombardo	Italy	21.7	Q
2	1	Luigi Gnocchi	Italy	22.0	Q
3	1	Farouk Tadros	Egypt	22.3	Q
4	1	Leonidas Kormalis	Greece	22.9	
5	1	Marcelino Hosta	Spain	24.5	
6	1	Habib Thiam	France	29.3	
1	2	Wolfango Montanari	Italy	21.8	Q
2	2	Yussef Zein El Abdin	Egypt	22.3	Q
3	2	Stefanos Petrakis	Greece	22.5	Q
4	2	Jean-Pierre Geslin	France	22.7	
5	2	Fahir Özgüden	Turkey	22.8	
6	2	Hassan Ahmed Ragab	Egypt	23.0	

Final – 23 July

Rank	Name	Nationality	Time	Notes
1st place, gold medalist(s)	Luigi Gnocchi	Italy	21.6	GR
2nd place, silver medalist(s)	Vincenzo Lombardo	Italy	21.7	
3rd place, bronze medalist(s)	Wolfango Montanari	Italy	21.7	
4	Yussef Zein El Abdin	Egypt	22.2	
5	Farouk Tadros	Egypt	22.3	
6	Stefanos Petrakis	Greece	22.7	

=== 400 meters ===
Heats – 20 July

Rank	Heat	Name	Nationality	Time	Notes
1	1	Pierre Haarhoff	France	57.2	Q
2	1	Francisco Ruf	Spain	57.4	Q
3	1	Farouk Tadros	Egypt	57.5	Q
4	1	Vincenzo Lombardo	Italy	57.7	Q
1	2	Jean-Pierre Goudeau	France	49.9	Q
2	2	Vassilios Sillis	Greece	50.0	Q
3	2	Hassan Ahmed Ragab	Egypt	50.0	Q
4	2	Fernando Bremón	Spain	50.1	Q
5	2	Marcello Dani	Italy	50.2	
1	3	Luigi Grossi	Italy	49.9	Q
2	3	Jacques Degats	France	50.5	Q
3	3	Leonidas Kormalis	Greece	50.5	Q
4	3	Fahir Özgüden	Turkey	50.6	Q
5	3	Felipe Martín	Spain	50.8	

Semifinals – 20 July

Rank	Heat	Name	Nationality	Time	Notes
1	1	Jacques Degats	France	48.7	Q
2	1	Jean-Pierre Goudeau	France	48.9	Q
3	1	Luigi Grossi	Italy	49.0	Q
4	1	Vassilios Sillis	Greece	49.5	
5	1	Hassan Ahmed Ragab	Egypt	50.4	
6	1	Francisco Ruf	Spain	50.5	
1	2	Pierre Haarhoff	France	47.8	Q
2	2	Farouk Tadros	Egypt	48.3	Q
3	2	Vincenzo Lombardo	Italy	48.3	Q
4	2	Fahir Özgüden	Turkey	49.3	
5	2	Fernando Bremón	Spain	49.8	
6	2	Leonidas Kormalis	Greece	50.1	

Final – 21 July

Rank	Name	Nationality	Time	Notes
1st place, gold medalist(s)	Jacques Degats	France	47.3	GR
2nd place, silver medalist(s)	Pierre Haarhoff	France	47.5	
3rd place, bronze medalist(s)	Vincenzo Lombardo	Italy	47.8	
4	Jean-Pierre Goudeau	France	48.0	
5	Farouk Tadros	Egypt	48.9	
6	Luigi Grossi	Italy	49.2	

=== 800 meters ===
Heats – 22 July

Rank	Heat	Name	Nationality	Time	Notes
1	1	Evangelos Depastas	Greece	1:52.6	Q
2	1	Tomás Barris	Spain	1:53.8	Q
3	1	René Djian	France	1:53.9	Q
4	1	Cahit Önel	Turkey	1:54.1	Q
5	1	José María Giménez	Spain	1:54.3	
6	1	Fadl El Sayed	Egypt	1:54.5	
1	2	Ekrem Koçak	Turkey	1:51.2	Q
2	2	Daniel Dupoux	France	1:52.6	Q
3	2	René Félicité	France	1:52.9	Q
4	2	Manuel García	Spain	1:54.0	Q
5	2	Vassilios Sillis	Greece	2:01.2	

Final – 24 July

Rank	Name	Nationality	Time	Notes
1st place, gold medalist(s)	Ekrem Koçak	Turkey	1:50.0	GR
2nd place, silver medalist(s)	René Djian	France	1:51.1	
3rd place, bronze medalist(s)	Evangelos Depastas	Greece	1:52.4	
4	René Félicité	France	1:53.0	
5	Manuel García	Spain	1:53.3	
6	Daniel Dupoux	France	1:53.5	
7	Tomás Barris	Spain	1:53.7	
8	Cahit Önel	Turkey	1:55.8	

=== 1500 meters ===
21 July

Rank	Name	Nationality	Time	Notes
1st place, gold medalist(s)	Ekrem Koçak	Turkey	3:50.2	GR
2nd place, silver medalist(s)	Cahit Önel	Turkey	3:52.2	
3rd place, bronze medalist(s)	Antoine Vincendon	France	3:53.2	
4	Tomás Barris	Spain	3:53.8	NR
5	Jean Vaillant	France	3:55.0	
6	Georgios Papavasileiou	Greece	3:55.2	
7	Gianfranco Baraldi	Italy	3:55.6	
8	Bernard Rohée	France	3:56.6	
9	José María Giménez	Spain	3:58.8	
10	Turhan Göker	Turkey	?:??.?	
11	Manuel Macías	Spain	?:??.?	

=== 5000 meters ===
22 July

Rank	Name	Nationality	Time	Notes
1st place, gold medalist(s)	Alain Mimoun	France	14:27.6	GR
2nd place, silver medalist(s)	Osman Coşgül	Turkey	14:39.0	
3rd place, bronze medalist(s)	Jean Carron	France	14:40.4	
4	Georgios Papavasileiou	Greece	14:41.2	
5	Luis García	Spain	14:49.6	
6	Maurice Simonet	France	15:00.8	
7	José Molíns	Spain	15:03.0	
8	Mahmoud El Rashidi	Egypt	15:24.0	

=== 10,000 meters ===
24 July

Rank	Name	Nationality	Time	Notes
1st place, gold medalist(s)	Alain Mimoun	France	30:23.6	GR
2nd place, silver medalist(s)	Luis García	Spain	31:32.8	
3rd place, bronze medalist(s)	Raymond Mahaut	France	31:48.2	
4	Mustafa Özcan	Turkey	31:53.2	
5	Mahmoud Saleh El Rashidi	Egypt	32:05.6	
6	Jesús Hurtado	Spain	33:16.4	

=== Marathon ===
18 July

Rank	Name	Nationality	Time	Notes
1st place, gold medalist(s)	Abdul Herin	Egypt	2:50:35	GR
2nd place, silver medalist(s)	Ali Hamid	Egypt	2:53.57	
3rd place, bronze medalist(s)	Erturan Haydar	Turkey	2:58.07	
	Jean Barthélémy	France	DNF	
	André Bouder	France	DNF	
	Jaime Guixa	Spain	DNF	
	Tomás Ostariz	Spain	DNF	
	Jaime Castro	Spain	DNF	

=== 110 meters hurdles ===
Heats – 21 July

Rank	Heat	Name	Nationality	Time	Notes
1	1	Philippe Candau	France	14.9	Q, GR
2	1	Ioannis Kambadelis	Greece	15.2	Q
3	1	Sébastian Junqueras	Spain	15.4	Q
4	1	Mustapha Marhoum	Egypt	15.8	
5	1	Juan Busquets	Spain	16.1	
1	2	Jacques Dohen	France	14.9	Q, =GR
2	2	Giampiero Massardi	Italy	15.4	Q
3	2	Jean-Claude Bernard	France	15.4	Q
4	2	Georgios Marsellos	Greece	15.8	
5	2	Joaquin Berenguer	Spain	19.9	

Final – 22 July

Rank	Name	Nationality	Time	Notes
1st place, gold medalist(s)	Philippe Candau	France	14.9	=GR
2nd place, silver medalist(s)	Jacques Dohen	France	15.2	
3rd place, bronze medalist(s)	Jean-Claude Bernard	France	15.4	
4	Giampiero Massardi	Italy	15.4	
5	Ioannis Kambadelis	Greece	15.7	
6	Sébastian Junqueras	Spain	20.0	

=== 400 meters hurdles ===
Heats – 23 July

Rank	Heat	Name	Nationality	Time	Notes
1	1	Armando Filiput	Italy	54.4	Q
2	1	Raymond Boisset	France	55.7	Q
3	1	Ioannis Kambadelis	Greece	56.4	Q
4	1	Nashat El Kholi	Egypt	56.6	
5	1	Aureliano Moret	Spain	57.7	
6	1	Amable Portoles	Spain	59.2	
1	2	Guy Cury	France	53.4	Q
2	2	Robert Bart	France	54.0	Q
3	2	Fotios Kosmas	Greece	55.2	Q
4	2	Javier Saiz	Spain	56.6	
5	2	Ibrahim Ghanem	Lebanon	1:02.8	

Final – 24 July

Rank	Name	Nationality	Time	Notes
1st place, gold medalist(s)	Guy Cury	France	52.4	GR
2nd place, silver medalist(s)	Robert Bart	France	52.8	
3rd place, bronze medalist(s)	Armando Filiput	Italy	53.4	
4	Raymond Boisset	France	53.6	
5	Ioannis Kambadelis	Greece	54.4	
6	Fotios Kosmas	Greece	1:00.8	

=== 3000 meters steeplechase ===
23 July

Rank	Name	Nationality	Time	Notes
1st place, gold medalist(s)	Georgios Papavasileiou	Greece	9:20.6	GR
2nd place, silver medalist(s)	Julien Soucours	France	9:23.6	
3rd place, bronze medalist(s)	José Teixeira	Spain	9:26.8	
4	Mustafa Özcan	Turkey	9:38.8	
5	Alonzo Cerezo	Spain	9:39.8	
6	Félix Bidegui	Spain	9:44.6	
7	Belkacem Chikhane	France	9:48.2	
8	Robert Boutard	France	9:49.6	

=== 4 × 100 meters relay ===
24 July

Rank	Nation	Competitors	Time	Notes
1st place, gold medalist(s)	Italy	Giovanni Ghiselli, Sergio D'Asnasch, Wolfango Montanari, Luigi Gnocchi	41.0	GR
2nd place, silver medalist(s)	Greece	Nikolaos Georgopoulos, Dimitrios Kipouros, Stefanos Petrakis, Konstantinos Tsalamanios	42.6	
3rd place, bronze medalist(s)	Egypt	Mustafa Marhoum, Emad El-Din Shafei, Fawzi Chaaban, Yussef Zein El Abdin	42.8	
4	Spain	Melanio Asensio, Marcelino Hosta, José María Alonso, Juan Miguel López	44.00	
	France	Jacques Derderian, ?, ?, ?	DNF	

=== 4 × 400 meters relay ===
24 July

Rank	Nation	Competitors	Time	Notes
1st place, gold medalist(s)	France	Jacques Degats, Pierre Haarhoff, René Galland, Jean-Paul Martin du Gard	3:12.8	GR
2nd place, silver medalist(s)	Italy	Luigi Grossi, Mario Paoletti, Vincenzo Lombardo, Baldassare Porto	3:14.4	
3rd place, bronze medalist(s)	Egypt	Hassan Ahmed Ragab, Fadl El Sayed, Nashat El Kholi, Farouk Tadros	3:16.2	
4	Greece	Leonidas Kormalis, Konstantinos Moragemos, Vassilios Syllis, Evangelos Depastas	3:19.4	
5	Spain	Fernando Bremón, Juan Cruz Echeandia, Francisco Ruf, Manuel García	3:20.0	NR

=== 10 kilometers walk ===
21 July

Rank	Name	Nationality	Time	Notes
1st place, gold medalist(s)	Pino Dordoni	Italy	48:21.8	GR
2nd place, silver medalist(s)	Roland Griset	France	48:44.2	
3rd place, bronze medalist(s)	Louis Chevalier	France	49:47.4	
4	Alberto Gurt	Spain	50:39.4	
5	Ioannis Skamangas	Greece	51:22.0	
6	José Planas	Spain	51:46.0	
7	Manuel Gracia	Spain	52:50.0	

=== 50 kilometers walk ===
23 July

Rank	Name	Nationality	Time	Notes
1st place, gold medalist(s)	Abdon Pamich	Italy	5:03:33	
2nd place, silver medalist(s)	Roger Chaylat	France	5:20:07	
3rd place, bronze medalist(s)	Francisco Villoldo	Spain	5:36:07	
4	Antonio Farres	Spain	6:06:45	
	Raymond Leborgne	France	DNF	

=== High jump ===
22 July

Rank	Name	Nationality	Result	Notes
1st place, gold medalist(s)	Maurice Fournier	France	1.98	
2nd place, silver medalist(s)	Papagallo Thiam	France	1.98	
3rd place, bronze medalist(s)	Çetin Şahiner	Turkey	1.90	
4	Georges Damitio	France	1.85	
5	Ioannis Koinis	Greece	1.85	
6	Juan Ignacio Ariño	Spain	1.85	
7	Erdal Ekkan	Turkey	1.85	
8	Georgios Marsellos	Greece	1.85	
9	Salvador Morales	Spain	1.75	

=== Pole vault ===
24 July

Rank	Name	Nationality	Result	Notes
1st place, gold medalist(s)	Giulio Chiesa	Italy	4.28	GR
2nd place, silver medalist(s)	Georgios Roubanis	Greece	4.25	
3rd place, bronze medalist(s)	Victor Sillon	France	4.20	
4	Rigas Efstathiadis	Greece	4.00	
5	Roland Gras	France	4.00	
6	Gamal El Shibiny	Egypt	3.70	
7	Fernando Adarraga	Spain	3.60	
8	Salvador Vadillo	Spain	3.50	

=== Long jump ===
23 July

Rank	Name	Nationality	#1	#2	#3	#4	#5	#6	Result	Notes
1st place, gold medalist(s)	Luigi Ulivelli	Italy	x	x	7.11	x	7.17	6.90	7.17	
2nd place, silver medalist(s)	Emad El Din Shafei	Egypt	6.69	7.11	7.05	x	6.95	7.05	7.11	
3rd place, bronze medalist(s)	René Cucuat	France	7.10	7.00	x	6.82	7.10	x	7.10	
4	Dimitrios Kipouros	Greece	6.70	6.99	7.10	6.98	6.95	7.00	7.10	
5	Antoine Bernal	France	x	6.94	x	7.00	x	7.05	7.05	
6	Ernest Wanko	France	6.77	6.29	6.93	6.83	x	–	6.93	
7	José María Alonso	Spain							6.91	
8	Luis Pérez	Spain							6.86	
9	Yarwant Bervekzyan	Egypt							6.61	
10	Ural Suphi	Turkey							6.58	
11	Fawzi Chaaban	Egypt							6.52	

=== Triple jump ===
20 July

Rank	Name	Nationality	#1	#2	#3	#4	#5	#6	Result	Notes
1st place, gold medalist(s)	Éric Battista	France	14.93	14.56	14.72	14.42	x	14.57	14.93	GR
2nd place, silver medalist(s)	Fawzi Chaaban	Egypt	14.59	14.54	x	14.07	x	14.22	14.59	
3rd place, bronze medalist(s)	Konstantinos Sfikas	Greece	14.58	14.25	14.45	x	13.91	x	14.58	
4	Serge Gaiddon	France	14.37	14.25	14.35	12.66	13.07	14.05	14.37	
5	Manuel Surroca	Spain	13.81	12.73	13.61	13.21	x	13.13	13.81	
6	José Parellada	Spain	13.34	x	x	x	13.15	12.60	13.34	
7	Leandro García	Spain	13.81	12.73	13.61	13.21	x	13.13	13.21	
8	Pierre Thiolon	France	13.34	x	x	x	13.15	12.60	13.15	

=== Shot put ===
22 July

Rank	Name	Nationality	#1	#2	#3	#4	#5	#6	Result	Notes
1st place, gold medalist(s)	Raymond Thomas	France	15.00	15.48	15.34	14.60	15.19	15.70	15.70	GR
2nd place, silver medalist(s)	Georgios Tsakanikas	Greece	13.85	15.13	15.49	15.49	15.04	15.41	15.49	
3rd place, bronze medalist(s)	Silvano Meconi	Italy	14.89	14.86	14.86	14.64	15.24	15.35	15.35	
4	Gérard Ernst	France	13.34	14.00	13.89	14.27	14.44	14.65	14.65	
5	Jean Darot	France	13.94	x	x	x	13.99	13.86	13.99	
6	Alfonso Vidal	Spain	12.76	12.81	12.62	12.33	12.91	12.71	12.91	
7	José del Pino	Spain							12.76	

=== Discus throw ===
23 July

Rank	Name	Nationality	#1	#2	#3	#4	#5	#6	Result	Notes
1st place, gold medalist(s)	Adolfo Consolini	Italy	48.10	49.23	50.98	50.53	52.81	44.95	52.81	GR
2nd place, silver medalist(s)	Antonios Kounadis	Greece	x	43.74	34.80	46.75	47.23	44.58	47.23	
3rd place, bronze medalist(s)	Konstantinos Giataganas	Greece	45.31	x	45.63	45.00	x	x	45.63	
4	Jean Guesdon	France	39.94	42.73	42.58	42.24	45.25	43.63	45.25	
5	Jean Darot	France	43.73	44.93	43.20	45.08	45.06	42.83	45.08	
6	Jean Maissant	France	44.69	44.26	44.79	42.25	43.30	43.45	44.79	
7	Turan Nuri	Turkey							42.38	
8	Alfonso Vidal	Spain							41.69	
9	José Luis Torres	Spain							40.84	

=== Hammer throw ===
21 July

Rank	Name	Nationality	#1	#2	#3	#4	#5	#6	Result	Notes
1st place, gold medalist(s)	Teseo Taddia	Italy	54.32	x	x	55.09	x	55.14	55.14	GR
2nd place, silver medalist(s)	Guy Husson	France	48.78	50.27	x	54.31	47.87	52.38	54.31	
3rd place, bronze medalist(s)	Dimitrios Boulboutzis	Greece	45.59	x	48.23	47.65	44.09	47.23	48.23	
4	Salvador Bosch	Spain	x	43.26	46.00	47.23	43.49	45.27	47.23	

=== Javelin throw ===
24 July

Rank	Name	Nationality	#1	#2	#3	#4	#5	#6	Result	Notes
1st place, gold medalist(s)	Michel Macquet	France	56.39	64.18	63.34	68.13	69.00	67.45	69.00	GR
2nd place, silver medalist(s)	Francesco Ziggiotti	Italy	64.88	61.04	66.22	57.11	63.62	63.55	66.22	
3rd place, bronze medalist(s)	Pedro Apellániz	Spain	48.38	62.64	x	54.54	x	x	62.64	
4	Oleg Syrovatski	France	55.07	61.92	61.83	61.60	62.60	59.78	62.60	
5	Jacques Guénard	France	55.32	49.49	60.98	56.52	58.54	59.66	60.98	
6	Mohamed Atef Ismail	Egypt	60.54	x	53.93	55.43	54.79	59.94	60.54	

=== Decathlon ===
20–21 July

The highest mark recorded in each event is highlighted in yellow

Rank	Athlete	Nationality	100m	LJ	SP	HJ	400m	110m H	DT	PV	JT	1500m	Points	Notes
1st place, gold medalist(s)	Bernardino Adarraga	Spain	12.0	6.22	12.65	1.65	53.0	17.0	38.97	3.50	53.59	4:30.4	5693	GR, NR
2nd place, silver medalist(s)	Mohamed Saïd Zaki	Egypt	11.4	6.88	11.95	1.60	50.8	18.1	35.50	3.70	43.10	4:41.0	5633	
3rd place, bronze medalist(s)	Robert Vaussenat	France	11.5	6.22	11.29	1.60	52.1	15.7	30.58	3.05	43.75	4:44.2	5262	
4	Fotios Kosmas	Greece	11.8	6.12	10.65	1.50	51.1	16.8	31.60	3.05	43.85	?	4529	
	Manuel González	Spain	11.6	6.67	11.63	1.65	51.5	19.4	36.53	DNF	–	–	DNF	
