= Athletics at the 1956 Summer Olympics – Men's 110 metres hurdles =

Men's 110 metres hurdles at the Games of the XVI Olympiad
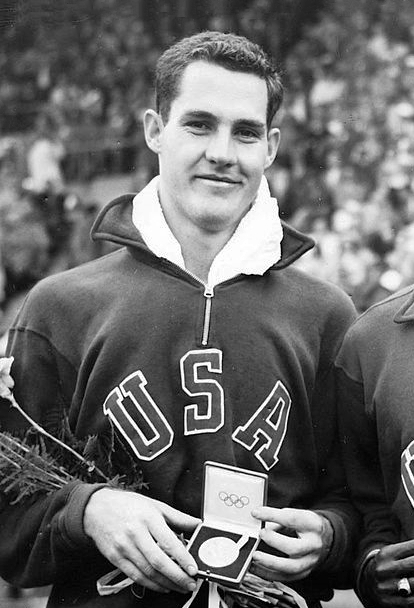
- Jack Davis, silver medalist for the second time; his official time both Games matched the winner's. (photo from 1952)
- Venue: Melbourne Cricket Ground
- Dates: November 27, 1956 (heats and quarterfinals); November 28, 1956 (semifinals and final)
- Competitors: 24 from 15 nations
- Winning time: 13.5 OR

Medalists
1st place, gold medalist(s)		Lee Calhoun; United States
2nd place, silver medalist(s)		Jack Davis; United States
3rd place, bronze medalist(s)		Joel Shankle; United States

Video on YouTube Official Video @45:55

The men's 110 metres hurdles was an event at the 1956 Summer Olympics in Melbourne, Australia. There were 24 athletes from 15 nations. The event took place on 27 and 28 November 1956. The maximum number of athletes per nation had been set at 3 since the 1930 Olympic Congress. The event was won by Lee Calhoun of the United States. It was the fifth of nine consecutive American victories, and the 11th overall gold medal for the United States in the 110 metres hurdles. It was also the third of four consecutive American podium sweeps, and the seventh overall sweep by the United States in the event.

Jack Davis won silver for the second consecutive Games. The United States had won 28 of the 35 medals in the high hurdles between 1896 and 1952, all by different hurdlers; Davis was the first American to win a second medal. By contrast, two of the five non-American medalists had won two medals apiece, so Davis was the third man overall to do so.

== Summary ==
Jack Davis came into the Olympics with the world record, having run 13.4 in a qualifying heat at the national championships a week before the Olympic trials. That was 5 months earlier. Here the three Americans were the class of the field, all three running the semi-final in 14.0, almost half a second faster than any other competitor.

In the final, Lee Calhoun in lane 2 got the edge, leading by half a meter by the third hurdle. Davis, across the track in lane 5, could only keep pace but couldn't make up the gap. He gave his best effort to lean at the tape but was clearly beaten by Calhoun. Four metres back, Joel Shankle completed the American sweep, three metres ahead of Martin Lauer. Almost three years later, Lauer would get Davis' world record. Calhoun would equal it a year after that, in the season leading up to his repeating as Olympic Champion in 1960 leading another American sweep over Lauer.

== Background ==
This was the 13th appearance of the event, which is one of 12 athletics events to have been held at every Summer Olympics. Two finalists from 1952 returned: silver medalist Jack Davis of the United States and fifth-place finisher Ken Doubleday of Australia. Davis, having also won the 1956 AAU championship with a new world record, was a "slight favorite" over countryman Lee Calhoun, who had tied Davis for first at the U.S. Olympic trials. The third American, Joel Shankle, was not quite at the level of Davis and Calhoun but was still good enough to give the United States a good chance at another medal sweep.

Colombia made its first appearance in the event; Germany competed as the "United Team of Germany" for the first time. The United States made its 13th appearance, the only nation to have competed in the 110 metres hurdles in each Games to that point.

== Competition format ==
The competition used the basic three-round format introduced in 1908. The first round consisted of four heats, with 6 or 7 hurdlers each (before withdrawals; there ultimately were 6 starters in each heat). The top three hurdlers in each heat advanced to the semifinals. The 12 semifinalists were divided into two semifinals of 6 hurdlers each; the top three hurdlers in each advanced to the 6-man final.

== Records ==
These were the standing world and Olympic records (in seconds) prior to the 1956 Summer Olympics.

World record	Jack Davis (USA)	13.4	Bakersfield, United States	22 June 1956
Olympic record	Harrison Dillard (USA)	13.7	Helsinki, Finland	24 July 1952

Lee Calhoun and Jack Davis were both officially clocked at 13.5 seconds in the final to break the Olympic record.

== Schedule ==
All times are Australian Eastern Standard Time (UTC+10)

Date	Time	Round
Tuesday, 27 November 1956	15:20	Round 1
Wednesday, 28 November 1956	14:30; 16:05	Semifinals; Final

== Results ==
=== Round 1 ===
==== Heat 1 ====
Rank	Lane	Athlete	Nation	Time (hand)	Time (auto)	Notes
1	5	Jack Davis	United States	14.0	14.17	Q
2	3	Edmond Roudnitska	France	14.3	14.49	Q
3	6	Ghulam Raziq	Pakistan	14.5	14.65	Q
4	4	Eamonn Kinsella	Ireland	14.6	14.66	
5	1	Kenneth Doubleday	Australia	14.8	14.98	
6	2	Guillermo Zapata	Colombia	15.3	15.58	
—	7	Amadeo Francis	Puerto Rico	DNS		
				Wind: +0.0 m/s		

==== Heat 2 ====
Rank	Lane	Athlete	Nation	Time (hand)	Time (auto)	Notes
1	6	Lee Calhoun	United States	14.1	14.36	Q
2	1	Stanko Lorger	Yugoslavia	14.6	14.75	Q
3	2	Jean-Claude Bernard	France	14.7	14.88	Q
4	3	Jack Parker	Great Britain	14.8	15.00	
5	5	John Chittick	Australia	14.9	15.18	
6	4	Kalim Khawaja Ghani	Pakistan	16.1	16.32	
				Wind: -3.0 m/s		

==== Heat 3 ====
Rank	Lane	Athlete	Nation	Time (hand)	Time (auto)	Notes
1	2	Joel Shankle	United States	14.0	14.20	Q
2	5	Bert Steines	United Team of Germany	14.3	14.59	Q
3	4	Danie Burger	South Africa	14.4	14.59	Q
4	3	Anatoly Mikhailov	Soviet Union	14.5	14.63	
5	6	Keith Gardner	Jamaica	14.6	14.65	
6	1	Bob Joyce	Australia	14.7	15.02	
				Wind: -0.7 m/s		

==== Heat 4 ====
Rank	Lane	Athlete	Nation	Time (hand)	Time (auto)	Notes
1	6	Martin Lauer	United Team of Germany	14.2	14.41	Q
2	4	Evaristo Iglesias	Cuba	14.3	14.52	Q
3	2	Boris Stolyarov	Soviet Union	14.3	14.54	Q
4	5	Peter Hildreth	Great Britain	14.5	14.68	
5	3	Ioannis Kambadelis	Greece	15.1	15.28	
6	1	Sri Chand Ram	India	15.2	15.40	
				Wind: -0.5 m/s		

==== Overall results for round 1 ====
Rank	Athlete	Nation	Time (hand)	Time (auto)	Notes
1	Jack Davis	United States	14.0	14.17	Q
2	Joel Shankle	United States	14.0	14.20	Q
3	Lee Calhoun	United States	14.1	14.36	Q
4	Martin Lauer	United Team of Germany	14.2	14.41	Q
5	Edmond Roudnitska	France	14.3	14.49	Q
6	Evaristo Iglesias	Cuba	14.3	14.52	Q
7	Boris Stolyarov	Soviet Union	14.3	14.54	Q
8	Bert Steines	United Team of Germany	14.3	14.59	Q
9	Danie Burger	South Africa	14.4	14.59	Q
10	Anatoly Mikhailov	Soviet Union	14.5	14.63	
11	Ghulam Raziq	Pakistan	14.5	14.65	Q
12	Peter Hildreth	Great Britain	14.5	14.68	
13	Keith Gardner	Jamaica	14.6	14.65	
14	Eamonn Kinsella	Ireland	14.6	14.66	
15	Stanko Lorger	Yugoslavia	14.6	14.75	Q
16	Jean-Claude Bernard	France	14.7	14.88	Q
17	Bob Joyce	Australia	14.7	15.02	
18	Kenneth Doubleday	Australia	14.8	14.98	
19	Jack Parker	Great Britain	14.8	15.00	
20	John Chittick	Australia	14.9	15.18	
21	Ioannis Kambadelis	Greece	15.1	15.28	
22	Sri Chand Ram	India	15.2	15.40	
23	Guillermo Zapata	Colombia	15.3	15.58	
24	Kalim Khawaja Ghani	Pakistan	16.1	16.32	
—	Amadeo Francis	Puerto Rico	DNS		

=== Semifinals ===
==== Semifinal 1 ====
Rank	Lane	Athlete	Nation	Time (hand)	Time (auto)	Notes
1	6	Jack Davis	United States	14.0	14.28	Q
2	3	Martin Lauer	United Team of Germany	14.4	14.57	Q
3	5	Stanko Lorger	Yugoslavia	14.6	14.73	Q
4	1	Evaristo Iglesias	Cuba	14.6	14.73	
5	2	Edmond Roudnitska	France	14.9	14.87	
6	4	Danie Burger	South Africa	15.0	14.95	
				Wind: -2.5 m/s		

==== Semifinal 2 ====
Rank	Lane	Athlete	Nation	Time (hand)	Time (auto)	Notes
1	5	Lee Calhoun	United States	14.0	14.18	Q
2	4	Joel Shankle	United States	14.0	14.23	Q
3	2	Boris Stolyarov	Soviet Union	14.5	14.64	Q
4	6	Bert Steines	United Team of Germany	14.5	14.70	
5	3	Ghulam Raziq	Pakistan	14.6	14.74	
6	1	Jean-Claude Bernard	France	14.6	14.78	
				Wind: -1.9 m/s		

==== Overall results for semifinals ====
Rank	Athlete	Nation	Time (hand)	Time (auto)	Notes
1	Lee Calhoun	United States	14.0	14.18	Q
2	Joel Shankle	United States	14.0	14.23	Q
3	Jack Davis	United States	14.0	14.28	Q
4	Martin Lauer	United Team of Germany	14.4	14.57	Q
5	Boris Stolyarov	Soviet Union	14.5	14.64	Q
6	Bert Steines	United Team of Germany	14.5	14.70	
7	Stanko Lorger	Yugoslavia	14.6	14.73	Q
7	Evaristo Iglesias	Cuba	14.6	14.73	
9	Ghulam Raziq	Pakistan	14.6	14.74	
10	Jean-Claude Bernard	France	14.6	14.78	
11	Edmond Roudnitska	France	14.9	14.87	
12	Danie Burger	South Africa	15.0	14.95	

=== Final ===
Rank	Lane	Athlete	Nation	Time (hand)	Time (auto)	Notes
1st place, gold medalist(s)	2	Lee Calhoun	United States	13.5	13.70	OR
2nd place, silver medalist(s)	5	Jack Davis	United States	13.5	13.73	OR
3rd place, bronze medalist(s)	1	Joel Shankle	United States	14.1	14.25	
4	6	Martin Lauer	United Team of Germany	14.5	14.67	
5	3	Stanko Lorger	Yugoslavia	14.5	14.68	
6	4	Boris Stolyarov	Soviet Union	14.6	14.71	
