= 1954 European Athletics Championships – Men's 110 metres hurdles =

Men's 110 metres hurdles at the European Athletics Championships

The men's 110 metres hurdles at the 1954 European Athletics Championships was held in Bern, Switzerland, at Stadion Neufeld on 25, 26, and 29 August 1954.

== Medalists ==
Gold	Yevgeniy Bulanchik; Soviet Union
Silver	John Parker; Great Britain
Bronze	Berthold Steines; West Germany

== Results ==
=== Final ===
29 August

Rank	Name	Nationality	Time	Notes
1st place, gold medalist(s)	Yevgeniy Bulanchik	Soviet Union	14.4	
2nd place, silver medalist(s)	John Parker	Great Britain	14.6	
3rd place, bronze medalist(s)	Berthold Steines	West Germany	14.7	
4	Stanko Lorger	Yugoslavia	14.7	
5	Eamonn Kinsella	Ireland	14.7	
6	Ion Opris	Romania	15.1	

=== Semi-finals ===
26 August

==== Semi-final 1 ====
Rank	Name	Nationality	Time	Notes
1	Stanko Lorger	Yugoslavia	14.5	Q
2	Berthold Steines	West Germany	14.6	Q
3	Eamonn Kinsella	Ireland	14.7	Q
4	Boris Stolyarov	Soviet Union	14.7	
5	Peter Hildreth	Great Britain	14.7	
6	Ioannis Kambadelis	Greece	15.5	

==== Semi-final 2 ====
Rank	Name	Nationality	Time	Notes
1	Yevgeniy Bulanchik	Soviet Union	14.6	Q
2	Ion Opris	Romania	14.8	Q
3	John Parker	Great Britain	14.8	Q
4	Olivier Bernard	Switzerland	14.8	
5	Jacques Dohan	France	15.0	
	Tor Olsen	Norway	DNS	

=== Heats ===
25 August

==== Heat 1 ====
Rank	Name	Nationality	Time	Notes
1	Yevgeniy Bulanchik	Soviet Union	14.7	Q
2	Olivier Bernard	Switzerland	15.0	Q
3	Ioannis Kambadelis	Greece	15.2	Q
4	Kenneth Johanson	Sweden	15.5	

==== Heat 2 ====
Rank	Name	Nationality	Time	Notes
1	Stanko Lorger	Yugoslavia	14.5	Q
2	John Parker	Great Britain	14.7	Q
3	Berthold Steines	West Germany	14.9	Q
4	Jan Borgersen	Norway	14.9	
5	Mustafa Batman	Turkey	15.4	
6	Pierre Bultiauw	Belgium	15.6	

==== Heat 3 ====
Rank	Name	Nationality	Time	Notes
1	Peter Hildreth	Great Britain	14.8	Q
2	Ion Opris	Romania	14.8	Q
3	Eamonn Kinsella	Ireland	14.9	Q
4	Edmond Roudnitska	France	14.9	
5	Hans Muchitsch	Austria	15.2	
6	Paul Pfenninger	Switzerland	15.3	

==== Heat 4 ====
Rank	Name	Nationality	Time	Notes
1	Boris Stolyarov	Soviet Union	14.7	Q
2	Tor Olsen	Norway	14.8	Q
3	Jacques Dohan	France	14.9	Q
4	Alois Krul	Czechoslovakia	14.9	
5	Willi Slabbers	Belgium	15.5	
6	Friedrich Zimmermann	Austria	15.9	

== Participation ==
According to an unofficial count, 22 athletes from 15 countries participated in the event.

- Austria (2)
- Belgium (2)
- Czechoslovakia (1)
- France (2)
- Greece (1)
- Ireland (1)
- Norway (2)
- Romania (1)
- Soviet Union (2)
- Sweden (1)
- Switzerland (2)
- Turkey (1)
- Great Britain (2)
- West Germany (1)
- Yugoslavia (1)
