= Italy at the 1955 Mediterranean Games =

- IOC code: ITA
- NOC: Italian National Olympic Committee

in Barcelona
- Medals Ranked 2nd: Gold 32 Silver 27 Bronze 22 Total 81

Mediterranean Games appearances (overview)
- 1951; 1955; 1959; 1963; 1967; 1971; 1975; 1979; 1983; 1987; 1991; 1993; 1997; 2001; 2005; 2009; 2013; 2018; 2022; 2026

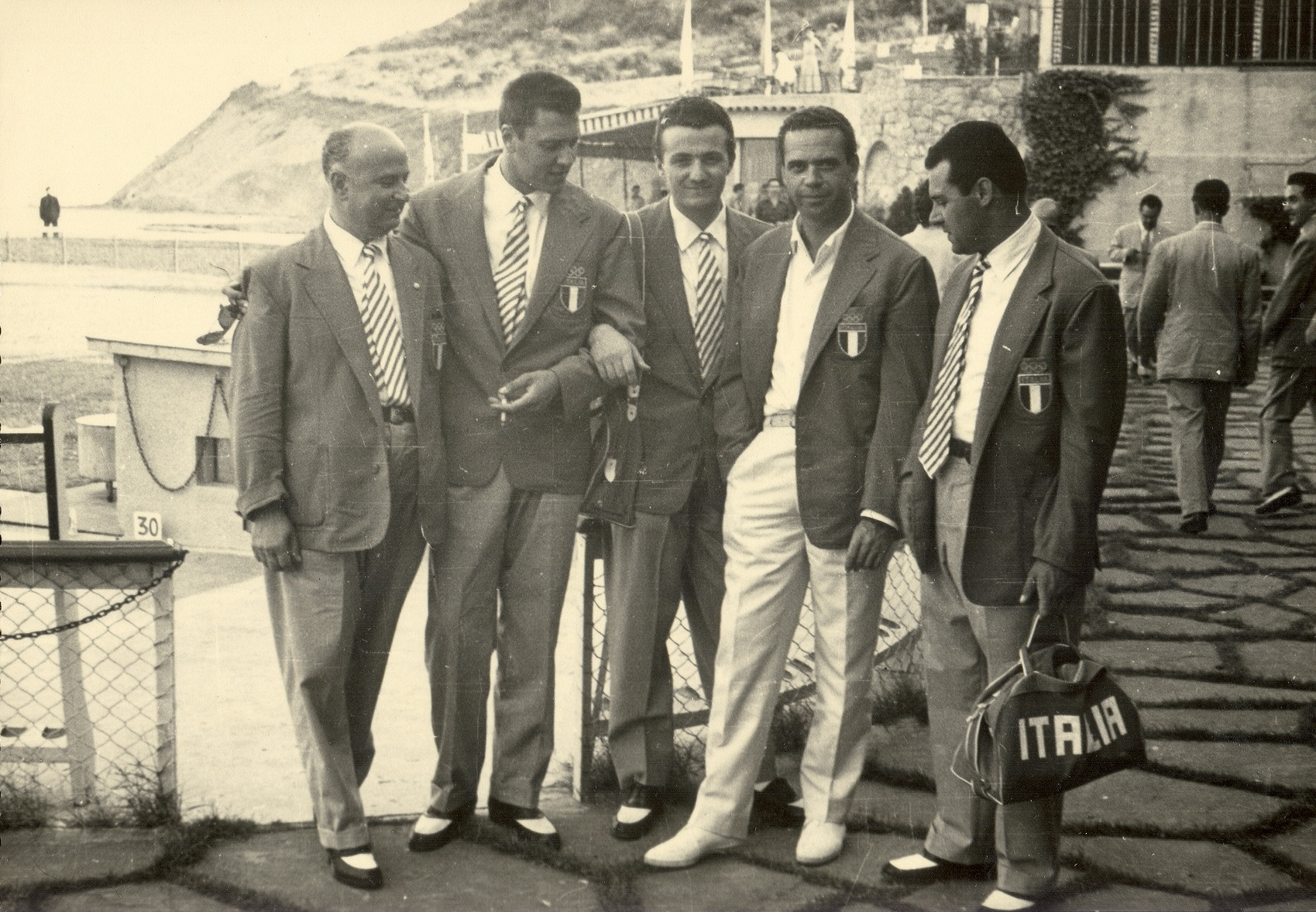
Italian skeet shooting team at the 1955 Mediterranean Games

Italy competed at the 1955 Mediterranean Games in Barcelona, Spain.

== Medals ==
=== Athletics ===
Sport	Gold	Silver	Bronze	Total
Athletics	9	3	5	17
Totals (1 entries)	9	3	5	17

==== Men ====
Event	1st place, gold medalist(s)	2nd place, silver medalist(s)	3rd place, bronze medalist(s)
100 metres	Luigi Gnocchi		Sergio D'Asnasch
200 metres	Luigi Gnocchi	Vincenzo Lombardo	Wolfango Montanari
10 km walk	Giuseppe Dordoni		
50 km walk	Abdon Pamich		
Pole vault	Giulio Chiesa		
Long jump	Luigi Ulivelli		
Discus throw	Adolfo Consolini		
Hammer throw	Teseo Taddia		
4×100 metres relay	Sergio D'Asnasch; Giovanni Ghiselli; Luigi Gnocchi; Wolfango Montanari		
Javelin throw		Francesco Ziggiotti	
4×400 metres relay		Luigi Grossi; Vincenzo Lombardo; Mario Paoletti; Baldassarre Porto	
400 metres			Vincenzo Lombardo
400 metres hurdles			Armando Filiput
Shot put			Silvano Meconi
	9	3	5
