= Athletics at the 1952 Summer Olympics – Men's 110 metres hurdles =

Men's 110 metres hurdles at the Games of the XV Olympiad
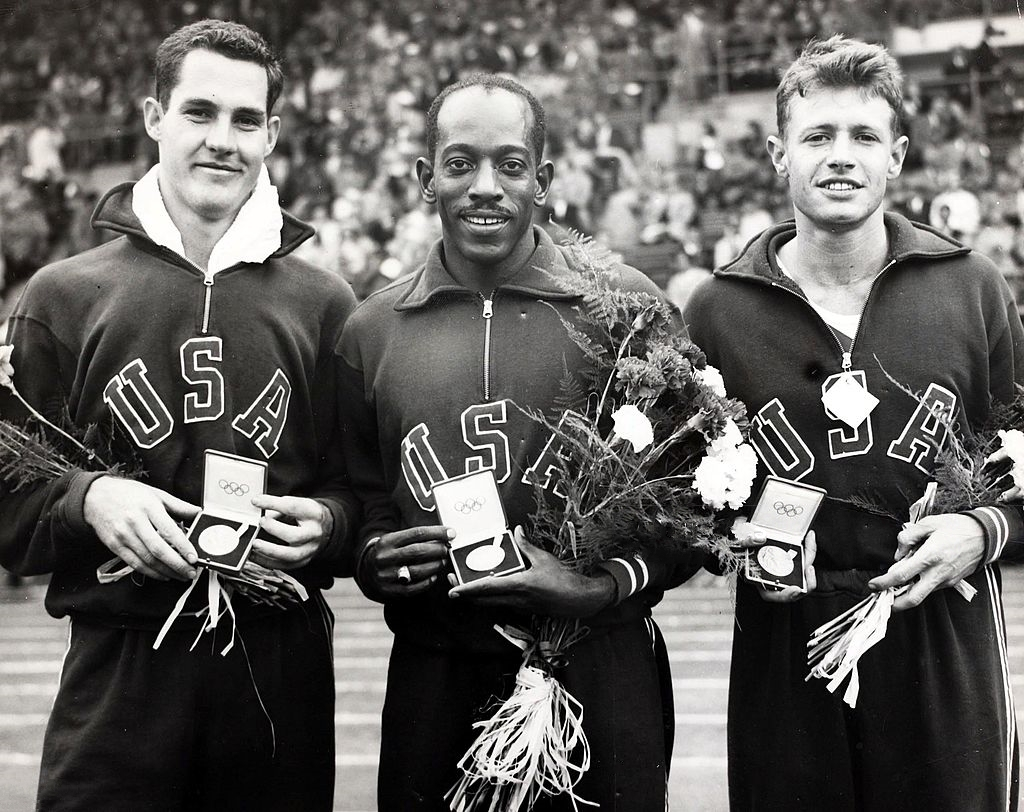
- Left-right: Davis, Dillard, Barnard
- Venue: Helsinki Olympic Stadium
- Dates: July 23, 1952 (heats); July 24, 1952 (semifinals, final)
- Competitors: 30 from 20 nations
- Winning time: 13.7 OR

Medalists
| 1st place, gold medalist(s) | | Harrison Dillard; United States |
| 2nd place, silver medalist(s) | | Jack Davis; United States |
| 3rd place, bronze medalist(s) | | Arthur Barnard; United States |

Video on YouTube amateur film Video on YouTube Official film

The men's 110 metres hurdles event at the 1952 Summer Olympic Games took place July 23 and July 24. Thirty athletes from 20 nations competed. The maximum number of athletes per nation had been set at 3 since the 1930 Olympic Congress. The final was won by the American Harrison Dillard. Dillard's compatriots, Jack Davis and Arthur Barnard, took 2nd and 3rd place. It was the fourth of nine consecutive American victories, and the tenth overall gold medal for the United States in the 110 metres hurdles. It was also the second of four consecutive American podium sweeps, and the sixth overall sweep by the United States in the event.

== Summary ==
This was the completion of the fabled story. Harrison Dillard failed to qualify in this event at the US Olympic Trials four years earlier, but succeeded in qualifying in a secondary event, the 100 meters, which he then won at the 1948 Olympics. After the long wait, this was his second chance to run the hurdles. American World Record holder Dick Attlesey had suffered career ending injuries earlier in the season and was not here. Dillard equalled the Olympic record of 13.9 in the first heat.

In the final, Jack Davis popped out of his blocks early in the first attempt to get the race started. In this era, a first false start only merited a warning, not disqualification. On the second start, fearing disqualification, Davis was pinned in his blocks. Dillard was out fast in the center of the track, gaining a full metre lead on Davis and Arthur Barnard by the second barrier. From there, Davis separated from Barnard and was slowly chipping away at Dillard's lead with each flight of hurdles. Barnard was also separating from the rest of the contenders. Davis was not able to catch Dillard, but did make it close, both men getting the same hand time 13.7, both getting credit for a new Olympic record. But new experimental fully automatic timing showed Dillard with a 13.91 and Davis with a 14.00. Barnard finished 4 tenths of a second later, another 4 tenths of a second faster than the rest of the world. This was the sixth time USA has swept the 110 metres hurdles. They would do it again in the next two Olympics for a total of eight.

== Background ==
This was the 12th appearance of the event, which is one of 12 athletics events to have been held at every Summer Olympics. None of the finalists from 1948 returned. Harrison Dillard of the United States was again a favorite to start the year. In 1948, he had fallen at the U.S. Olympic trials and failed to qualify in the event (though he did qualify in the 100 metres flat—eventually winning the gold medal in that event in London). His primary competition, world record holder Dick Attlesey, was injured and did not make it through the U.S. trials. Arthur Barnard and Jack Davis, however, completed an American team that once again was deep and expected to make a run for a podium sweep.

Cuba, Egypt, Iceland, Luxembourg, the Soviet Union, and Venezuela each made their first appearance in the event. The United States made its 12th appearance, the only nation to have competed in the 110 metres hurdles in each Games to that point.

== Competition format ==
The competition used the basic three-round format introduced in 1908. The first round consisted of six heats, with 5 or 6 hurdlers each (before withdrawals; heat 5, for example, had only three starters). The top two hurdlers in each heat advanced to the semifinals. The 12 semifinalists were divided into two semifinals of 6 hurdlers each; the top three hurdlers in each advanced to the 6-man final.

== Records ==
These were the standing world and Olympic records (in seconds) prior to the 1952 Summer Olympics.

| World record | Richard Attlesey (USA) | 13.5 | Helsinki, Finland | 10 July 1950 |
| Olympic record | William Porter (USA) | 13.9 | London, United Kingdom | 4 August 1948 |

Harrison Dillard matched the Olympic record in the first heat, then broke it in the final. He and Jack Davis were both officially clocked at 13.7 seconds.

== Schedule ==
All times are Eastern European Summer Time (UTC+3)

| Date | Time | Round |
|---|---|---|
| Wednesday, 23 July 1952 | 15:00 | Round 1 |
| Thursday, 24 July 1952 | 15:00; 18:20 | Semifinals; Final |

== Results ==
=== Round 1 ===
The first round was held on July 23. The two fastest runners from each heat qualified to the semifinals.

==== Heat 1 ====
| Rank | Lane | Athlete | Nation | Time (hand) | Time (auto) | Notes |
|---|---|---|---|---|---|---|
| 1 | 2 | Harrison Dillard | United States | 13.9 | 14.03 | Q, =OR |
| 2 | 3 | Sergey Popov | Soviet Union | 14.8 | 14.99 | Q |
| 3 | 6 | Olivier Bernard | Switzerland | 15.1 | 15.29 | |
| 4 | 1 | Erdal Barkay | Turkey | 15.2 | 15.34 | |
| 5 | 4 | Edmundo Ohaco | Chile | 15.4 | 15.61 | |
| 6 | 5 | Olli Alho | Finland | 15.4 | 15.63 | |

==== Heat 2 ====
| Rank | Lane | Athlete | Nation | Time (hand) | Time (auto) | Notes |
|---|---|---|---|---|---|---|
| 1 | 4 | Yevhen Bulanchyk | Soviet Union | 14.4 | 14.65 | Q |
| 2 | 6 | Edmond Roudnitska | France | 14.9 | 15.11 | Q |
| 3 | 3 | Estanislao Kocourek | Argentina | 15.0 | 15.20 | |
| 4 | 2 | Risto Syrjänen | Finland | 15.4 | 15.63 | |
| 5 | 1 | Juan Lebrón | Puerto Rico | 15.4 | 15.71 | |
| 6 | 5 | Fouad Yazgi | Egypt | 16.1 | 16.26 | |

==== Heat 3 ====
| Rank | Lane | Athlete | Nation | Time (hand) | Time (auto) | Notes |
|---|---|---|---|---|---|---|
| 1 | 3 | Jack Davis | United States | 14.0 | 14.23 | Q |
| 2 | 6 | Stanko Lorger | Yugoslavia | 14.8 | 15.08 | Q |
| 3 | 1 | Samuel Anderson | Cuba | 15.1 | 15.24 | |
| 4 | 4 | Wolfgang Troßbach | Germany | 15.1 | 15.24 | |
| 5 | 2 | Téofilo Davis | Venezuela | 15.7 | 15.96 | |
| — | 5 | Sebastián Junqueras | Spain | DNS | — | |

==== Heat 4 ====
| Rank | Lane | Athlete | Nation | Time (hand) | Time (auto) | Notes |
|---|---|---|---|---|---|---|
| 1 | 4 | Ken Doubleday | Australia | 14.5 | 14.65 | Q |
| 2 | 6 | Jack Parker | Great Britain | 14.8 | 15.08 | Q |
| 3 | 2 | Gordon Crosby | Canada | 14.8 | 15.11 | |
| 4 | 5 | Téofilo Colón | Puerto Rico | 15.2 | 15.48 | |
| — | 1 | Mikhail Mikhail | Greece | DNS | — | |
| — | 3 | Imre Retezar | Hungary | DNS | — | |

==== Heat 5 ====
| Rank | Lane | Athlete | Nation | Time (hand) | Time (auto) | Notes |
|---|---|---|---|---|---|---|
| 1 | 3 | Ray Weinberg | Australia | 14.4 | 14.62 | Q |
| 2 | 5 | Väinö Suvivuo | Finland | 14.9 | 15.21 | Q |
| 3 | 4 | Jörn Gevert | Chile | 15.2 | 15.44 | |
| — | 2 | Hakan Eper | Turkey | DNS | — | |
| — | 1 | Wilson Carneiro | Brazil | DNS | — | |

==== Heat 6 ====
| Rank | Lane | Athlete | Nation | Time (hand) | Time (auto) | Notes |
|---|---|---|---|---|---|---|
| 1 | 6 | Arthur Barnard | United States | 14.4 | 14.61 | Q |
| 2 | 4 | Peter Hildreth | Great Britain | 14.7 | 14.94 | Q |
| 3 | 5 | Michitaka Kinami | Japan | 15.0 | 15.31 | |
| 4 | 2 | Ingi Þorsteinsson | Iceland | 15.6 | 15.76 | |
| 5 | 1 | Jacques Dohen | France | 15.7 | 16.02 | |
| 6 | 3 | Johny Fonck | Luxembourg | 16.1 | 16.35 | |

=== Semifinals ===
The semifinals were held on July 24. The three fastest runners advanced to the final.

==== Semifinal 1 ====
| Rank | Lane | Athlete | Nation | Time (hand) | Time (auto) | Notes |
|---|---|---|---|---|---|---|
| 1 | 4 | Harrison Dillard | United States | 14.0 | 14.15 | Q |
| 2 | 6 | Arthur Barnard | United States | 14.2 | 14.44 | Q |
| 3 | 5 | Ken Doubleday | Australia | 14.5 | 14.74 | Q |
| 4 | 1 | Sergey Popov | Soviet Union | 14.7 | 15.04 | |
| 5 | 3 | Edmond Roudnitska | France | 14.9 | 15.15 | |
| 6 | 2 | Peter Hildreth | Great Britain | 14.9 | 15.15 | |

==== Heat 2 ====
| Rank | Lane | Athlete | Nation | Time (hand) | Time (auto) | Notes |
|---|---|---|---|---|---|---|
| 1 | 3 | Jack Davis | United States | 14.4 | 14.62 | Q |
| 2 | 1 | Yevhen Bulanchyk | Soviet Union | 14.4 | 14.70 | Q |
| 3 | 6 | Ray Weinberg | Australia | 14.6 | 14.99 | Q |
| 4 | 5 | Stanko Lorger | Yugoslavia | 14.9 | 15.09 | |
| 5 | 4 | Väinö Suvivuo | Finland | 14.9 | 15.31 | |
| 6 | 2 | Jack Parker | Great Britain | 15.0 | 15.31 | |

=== Final ===
| Rank | Lane | Athlete | Nation | Time (hand) | Time (auto) | Notes |
|---|---|---|---|---|---|---|
| 1st place, gold medalist(s) | 4 | Harrison Dillard | United States | 13.7 | 13.91 | OR |
| 2nd place, silver medalist(s) | 1 | Jack Davis | United States | 13.7 | 14.00 | OR |
| 3rd place, bronze medalist(s) | 5 | Arthur Barnard | United States | 14.1 | 14.40 | |
| 4 | 2 | Yevhen Bulanchyk | Soviet Union | 14.5 | 14.73 | |
| 5 | 3 | Ken Doubleday | Australia | 14.7 | 14.82 | |
| 6 | 6 | Ray Weinberg | Australia | 14.8 | 15.15 | |
