= 1958 European Athletics Championships – Men's 110 metres hurdles =

Men's 110 metres hurdles at the European Athletics Championships

The men's 110 metres hurdles at the 1958 European Athletics Championships was held in Stockholm, Sweden, at Stockholms Olympiastadion on 22, 23, and 24 August 1958.

== Medalists ==
Gold	Martin Lauer; West Germany
Silver	Stanko Lorger; Yugoslavia
Bronze	Anatoliy Mikhailov; Soviet Union

== Results ==
=== Final ===
24 August Wind: 0.8 m/s

Rank	Name	Nationality	Time	Notes
1st place, gold medalist(s)	Martin Lauer	West Germany	13.7	AR
2nd place, silver medalist(s)	Stanko Lorger	Yugoslavia	14.1	
3rd place, bronze medalist(s)	Anatoliy Mikhailov	Soviet Union	14.4	
4	Peter Hildreth	Great Britain	14.4	
5	Giorgio Mazza	Italy	14.6	
6	Kenneth Johanson	Sweden	14.7	

=== Semi-finals ===
23 August

==== Semi-final 1 ====
Wind: 0.9 m/s

Rank	Name	Nationality	Time	Notes
1	Martin Lauer	West Germany	14.5	Q
2	Peter Hildreth	Great Britain	14.9	Q
3	Anatoliy Mikhailov	Soviet Union	14.9	Q
4	Tor Olsen	Norway	14.9	
5	Nereo Svara	Italy	15.0	
6	Eef Kamerbeek	Netherlands	15.1	

==== Semi-final 2 ====
Wind: 1.6 m/s

Rank	Name	Nationality	Time	Notes
1	Stanko Lorger	Yugoslavia	14.4	Q
2	Giorgio Mazza	Italy	14.7	Q
3	Kenneth Johanson	Sweden	14.8	Q
4	Jacques Dohen	France	14.9	
5	Georgios Marsellos	Greece	15.0	
6	Günter Brand	West Germany	15.1	

=== Heats ===
22 August

==== Heat 1 ====
Wind: 1.1 m/s

Rank	Name	Nationality	Time	Notes
1	Martin Lauer	West Germany	14.2	CR Q
2	Tor Olsen	Norway	14.8	Q
3	Nereo Svara	Italy	15.0	Q
4	Milad Petrušić	Yugoslavia	15.2	
5	Eamonn Kinsella	Ireland	15.3	

==== Heat 2 ====
Wind: 0.2 m/s

Rank	Name	Nationality	Time	Notes
1	Anatoliy Mikhailov	Soviet Union	14.5	Q
2	Peter Hildreth	Great Britain	14.5	Q
3	Jacques Dohen	France	14.9	Q
4	Peter Nederhand	Netherlands	14.9	
5	Lars Bergland	Sweden	15.3	
6	Ioannis Kambadellis	Greece	15.3	

==== Heat 3 ====
Wind: 1.1 m/s

Rank	Name	Nationality	Time	Notes
1	Stanko Lorger	Yugoslavia	14.4	Q
2	Georgios Marsellos	Greece	14.8	Q
3	Eef Kamerbeek	Netherlands	14.8	Q
4	Ivan Veselský	Czechoslovakia	15.0	
5	Edward Bugała	Poland	15.3	
6	Heinrich Staub	Switzerland	15.5	

==== Heat 4 ====
Wind: 0.5 m/s

Rank	Name	Nationality	Time	Notes
1	Giorgio Mazza	Italy	14.5	Q
2	Kenneth Johanson	Sweden	14.6	Q
3	Günter Brand	West Germany	15.6	Q
4	Georges Salmon	Belgium	15.6	

== Participation ==
According to an unofficial count, 21 athletes from 15 countries participated in the event.

- Belgium (1)
- Czechoslovakia (1)
- France (1)
- Greece (2)
- Ireland (1)
- Italy (2)
- Netherlands (2)
- Norway (1)
- Poland (1)
- Soviet Union (1)
- Sweden (2)
- Switzerland (1)
- Great Britain (1)
- West Germany (2)
- Yugoslavia (2)
