= 1955 Italian Athletics Championships =

Edition of the Italian Athletics Championships

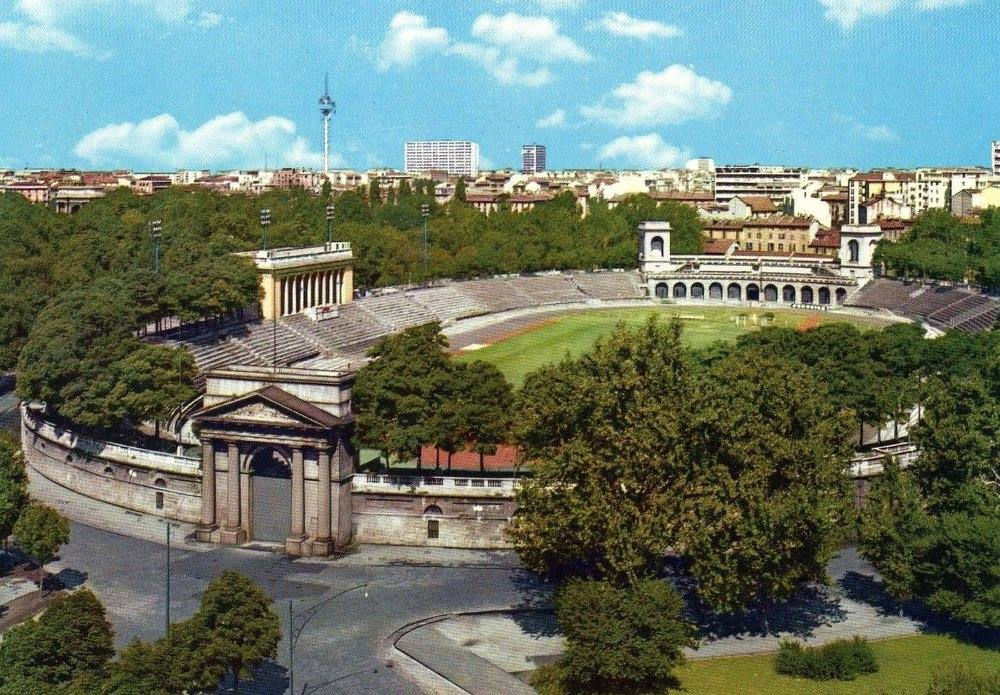
- The Civic Arena in Milan, venue of the main event
- Dates: 30 September – 2 October (main event)
- Host city: Milan (30 September – 2 October); Pisa (half marathon, 12 June); Naples (marathon, 11 September); Padua (3000 m st & decathlon, 8–9 October); Genoa (20 km walk, 9 October)
- Venue: Arena Civica
- Level: Senior
- Events: 32 (23 men, 9 women)

The 1955 Italian Athletics Championships was the 45th edition of the Italian Athletics Championships and were held in Milan (main event) from 30 September to 2 October.

== Champions ==
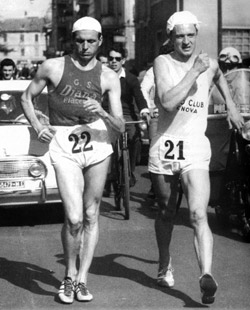
Pino Dordoni (#22 on the left) won 10,000 m on track and 20 km on road in the racewalking.

Track events
Event	Men	Performance	Women	Performance
100 m	Luigi Gnocchi	10.6	Giusy Leone	12.0
200 m	Luigi Gnocchi	21.4	Giusy Leone	24.9
400 m	Vincenzo Lombardo	48.2		
800 m	Giovanni Scavo	1:53.0	Maria Antonietta Albano	2:24.5
1500 m	Gianfranco Baraldi	3:53.6		
5000 m	Francesco Perrone	14:54.0		
10,000 m	Rino Lavelli	31:28.2 CR		
110/80 m hs	Giampiero Massardi	15.1	Milena Greppi	11.3
400 m hs	Moreno Martini	53.1		
3000 m st	Valentino Mansutti	10:03.5		
10,000 m walk	Pino Dordoni	46:04:2		
Field events
High jump	Gianmario Roveraro	1.94 m CR	Paola Paternoster	1.55 m
Pole vault	Edmondo Ballotta	4.10 m		
Long jump	Attilio Bravi	7.33 m	Piera Fassio	5.70 m CR
Triple jump	Antonio Trogu	14.73 m		
Shot put	Silvano Meconi	15.90 m CR	Paola Paternoster	12.63 m
Discus throw	Adolfo Consolini	54.75 m	Paola Paternoster	45.52 m CR
Hammer throw	Teseo Taddia	54.42 m		
Javelin throw	Raffaele Bonaiuto	64.65 m	Ada Turci	41.84 m
Combined
Decathlon/Pentathlon	Umberto Bordignon	5185 pts		
Road events
Half marathon	Edoardo Righi	1:09:55		
Marathon	Artidoro Berti	2:33:05.8		
20 km walk	Pino Dordoni	1:35:37.0		
