= Djian =

Djian is a surname. Notable people with the surname include:

- Jean-Marc Djian (born 1966), French ice hockey player
- Marcelo Djian (born 1966), Brazilian footballer
- Marthe Djian (born 1936), French athlete
- Philippe Djian (born 1949), French author of Armenian descent
- René Djian (1927–2024), French middle-distance runner
