= Chand Ram =

Chand Ram may refer to:

- Siri Chand Ram (born 1958), Indian race walker
- Sri Chand Ram (born 1934), Indian hurdler
- Chand Ram (politician) (1923–2015), Indian politician
