= Wolfango Montanari =

Italian sprinter (1931–2021)

Personal information
- Nationality: Italian
- Born: 16 May 1931 Terni, Italy
- Died: 23 February 2021 (aged 89) Terni, Italy

Sport
- Country: Italy
- Sport: Athletics
- Event: Sprint
Medal record
Mediterranean Games
Gold medal – first place	1951 Alexandria	4×100 metres relay
Gold medal – first place	1955 Barcelona	4×100 metres relay
Bronze medal – third place	1951 Alexandria	100 metres
Bronze medal – third place	1951 Alexandria	200 metres
Bronze medal – third place	1955 Barcelona	100 metres

Wolfango Montanari (16 May 1931 – 23 February 2021) was an Italian sprinter.

== Biography ==
He won five medals at the International athletics competitions, two of these with national relays team. He competed in the 1952 Summer Olympics, he has 14 caps in national team from 1951 to 1957.

== Achievements ==
Year	Competition	Venue	Position	Event	Time	Notes
1951	Mediterranean Games	(Egypt) Alexandria	1st	4×100 metres relay	42.4	
1951	Mediterranean Games	(Egypt) Alexandria	3rd	100 metres	11.3	
1951	Mediterranean Games	(Egypt) Alexandria	3rd	200 metres	22.1	
1952	Olympics	(Finland) Helsinki	7th Heat 7	100 metres	11.8/12.25	
1955	Mediterranean Games	(Spain) Barcelona	1st	4×100 metres relay	41.0	
1955	Mediterranean Games	(Spain) Barcelona	3rd	200 metres	21.7	

== See also ==
- Italy national relay team
- Italy at the 1951 Mediterranean Games
- Italy at the 1955 Mediterranean Games
