= Georgios Papavasileiou =

Greek middle-distance runner (1930–2020)

Personal information
- Nationality: Greek
- Born: 10 December 1930 Arethousa, Greece
- Died: 12 March 2020 (aged 89) Athens, Greece
- Height: 1.76 m (5 ft 9 in)
- Weight: 63 kg (139 lb)

Sport
- Sport: Athletics
- Events: 1500 m; 3000 m steeplechase; 5000 m
- Club: Aris Thessaloniki

Achievements and titles
- Personal bests: 1500 m – 3:51.4 (1958); 3000 m st. – 8:45.8 (1960)
Medal record
Representing Greece
Mediterranean Games
Gold medal – first place	1955 Barcelona	3000 m st.
Gold medal – first place	1959 Beirut	3000 m st.

Georgios Papavasileiou (Greek: Γεώργιος Παπαβασιλείου; 10 December 1930 – 12 March 2020) was a Greek middle-distance and steeplechase runner who competed in the 1956 Summer Olympics and in the 1960 Summer Olympics. He was named the 1955 Greek Athlete of the Year.

He won back-to-back steeplechase titles at the Mediterranean Games in 1955 and 1959. He also won the steeplechase event in the Balkan Athletics Championships seven times in a row from 1955 to 1961. In the Panhellenic Championships, Papavasileiou won the steeplechase event eleven times, also winning seven times in the 5,000 metres race, and six times in cross-country races.

== Competition record ==
Year	Competition	Venue	Position	Event	Notes
Representing Greece
1955	Mediterranean Games	Barcelona, Spain	6th	1500 m	3:55.2
1955	Mediterranean Games	Barcelona, Spain	4th	5000 m	14:41.2
1955	Mediterranean Games	Barcelona, Spain	1st	3000 m st.	9:20.6
1956	Olympic Games	Melbourne, Australia	27th (h)	1500 m	3:57.0
1956	Olympic Games	Melbourne, Australia	15th (h)	3000 m st.	8:55.6
1959	Mediterranean Games	Beirut, Lebanon	7th	10,000 m	31:24.0
1959	Mediterranean Games	Beirut, Lebanon	1st	3000 m st.	9:04.0
1960	Olympic Games	Rome, Italy	10th (h)	3000 m st.	8:51.2
