= Kinami =

Kinami (written: 木南 or 木浪) is a Japanese surname. Notable people with the surname include:

- Haruka Kinami (木南 晴夏, born 1985), Japanese actress
- Michitaka Kinami (木南 道孝, 1920–2008), Japanese hurdler
- Seiya Kinami (木浪 聖也, born 1994), Japanese baseball player
