= Jack Davis (hurdler) =

American hurdler (1930–2012)

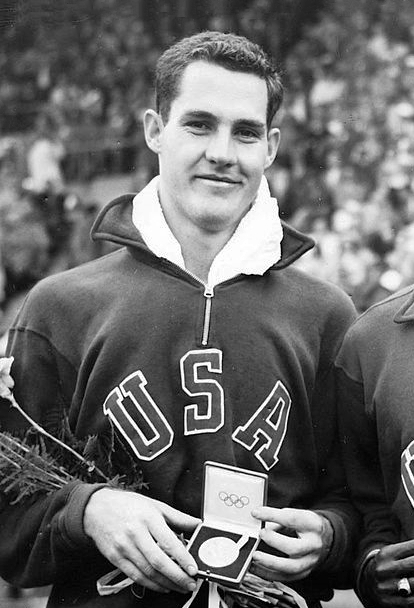
- Davis at the 1952 Olympics

Personal information
- Born: September 11, 1930 Amarillo, Texas, U.S.
- Died: July 20, 2012 (aged 81) San Diego, California, U.S.
- Height: 190 cm (6 ft 3 in)
- Weight: 70 kg (154 lb)

Sport
- Sport: Athletics
- Event: 110 m hurdles
- Club: U.S. Navy

Achievements and titles
- Personal best: 110 mH – 13.3 (1956)
Medal record
Representing the United States
Olympic Games
| Silver medal – second place | 1952 Helsinki | 110 m hurdles |
| Silver medal – second place | 1956 Melbourne | 110 m hurdles |
Pan American Games
| Gold medal – first place | 1955 Mexico City | 110 m hurdles |

Jack Wells Davis (September 11, 1930 – July 20, 2012) was an American track and field hurdler, silver medalist in the 1952 and 1956 Olympics over 110-meter hurdles. Davis lost to Harrison Dillard in 1952 with the same time as the winner, and lost to Lee Calhoun in 1956, again with the same time as the winner. He set a new world record 13.4 in a heat at the AAU in 1956.

Davis attended Herbert Hoover High School in Glendale, California, where he won both hurdle races at the 1949 CIF California State Meet, along with a third in the long jump. After that performance, he was named "Athlete of the Meet." He then went to the University of Southern California. At USC he was a three-time NCAA 120y hurdle champion and the 1953 NCAA 220y hurdle champion. He was a three-time U.S. Outdoor 220y hurdles champion, and ranked #1 on three occasions. In 2004, he was inducted into the USA Track & Field Hall of Fame, and the USC Hall of Fame.

Davis served in the U.S. Navy in 1954–57, and then became a real estate developer. He helped found the United States Olympic Training Center in Chula Vista, California.
