= Alain David =

Alain David may refer to:

- Alain David (sprinter)
- Alain David (politician)
