= Ulivelli =

Ulivelli is a surname. Notable people with the surname include:

- Cosimo Ulivelli (1625–1705), Italian painter
- Luigi Ulivelli (1935–2010), Italian athlete
