= Fines Creek, North Carolina =

- Populated place
- Interactive map of Fines Creek, North Carolina
- Coordinates: 35.681°N 82.951°W
- Country: United States
- State: North Carolina
- County: Haywood
- Elevation: 2,520 ft (770 m)
- Time zone: UTC-5 (Eastern (EST))
  - Summer (DST): UTC-4 (EDT)
- ZIP code: 28721
- Area code: 828
- GNIS feature ID: 1020244

Fines Creek is a populated place within the township of Fines Creek in Haywood County, North Carolina, United States.

Famous people include: Vinet Fine, namesake of town, Joel Shankle, an Olympic medalist

== History ==
Prior to European colonization, the area that is now Fines Creek was inhabited by the Cherokee people and other Indigenous peoples for thousands of years. The Cherokee in Western North Carolina are known as the Eastern Band of Cherokee Indians, a federally recognized tribe.

== Geography ==
Fines Creek is located at latitude 35.681 and longitude -82.951. The elevation is 2,520 feet.
