= Luigi Ulivelli =

Italian long jumper

Personal information
- Nationality: Italian
- Born: 8 September 1935 Corazzano, Italy
- Died: 17 February 2010 (aged 74)
- Height: 1.77 m (5 ft 9 1/2 in)
- Weight: 67 kg (148 lb)

Sport
- Country: Italy
- Sport: Athletics
- Event: Long jump
- Club: Atletica Livorno

Achievements and titles
- Personal best: Long jump: 7.57 m (1959)
Medal record
Representing Italy
Mediterranean Games
Gold medal – first place	1955 Barcelona	Long jump

Luigi Ulivelli (8 September 1935 – 17 February 2010) was an athlete from Italy, who mainly competed in the long jump.

== Biography ==
He represented his native country at the 1960 Summer Olympics in Rome, Italy. He was born in Corazzano, Pisa. Ulivelli was selected for Italy five times prior to the 1960 Olympics, which was his first major international meet. There he sustained an injury in qualifying that ended his career. In 1955, Ulivelli won the long jump gold at the Mediterranean Games. He has 6 caps in national team from 1954 to 1960.

== Olympic results ==
Year	Competition	Venue	Position	Event	Performance	Note
1960	Olympic Games	(Italy) Rome	Qual.	Long jump	NM	

== See also ==
- Italy at the 1955 Mediterranean Games
