= Sergey Popov (hurdler) =

Soviet athlete (1929–2018)

Sergey Nikolayevich Popov
Personal information
- Nationality: Soviet
- Born: 16 March 1929
- Died: 2 December 2018 (aged 89)

Sport
- Sport: Track and field
- Event: 110 metres hurdles

Sergey Nikolayevich Popov (16 March 1929 – 2 December 2018) was a Soviet hurdler. He competed in the men's 110 metres hurdles at the 1952 Summer Olympics.
