= Olli Alho =

Finnish hurdler

Personal information
- Nationality: Finnish
- Born: 19 October 1919 Jyväskylä, Finland
- Died: 10 April 2005 (aged 85) Helsinki, Finland

Sport
- Sport: Track and field
- Event: 110 metres hurdles

Olli Alho (19 October 1919 – 20 April 2005) was a Finnish hurdler. He competed in the men's 110 metres hurdles at the 1952 Summer Olympics.
