= Kalim Khawaja Ghani =

Pakistani hurdler (1931–2003)

Personal information
- Nationality: Pakistani
- Born: 1931
- Died: 27 May 2003 (aged 71–72)

Sport
- Sport: Track and field
- Event: 110 metres hurdles

Kalim Khawaja Ghani (1931 – 27 May 2003) was a Pakistani hurdler. He competed in the men's 110 metres hurdles at the 1956 Summer Olympics.

An under-20 athletics championship was organized in October 2016 at National Sports Training and Coaching Center, in Karachi, to honor the memory of Khawaja Ghani.
