= Bert Steines =

German hurdler

Personal information
- Nationality: German
- Born: 30 December 1929 Pfalzel, Germany
- Died: 21 September 1998 (aged 68) Buseck, Germany

Sport
- Sport: Track and field
- Event: 110 metres hurdles
Medal record
Men's athletics
Representing Germany
European Championships
Bronze medal – third place	1954 Bern	110 m hurdles

Bert Steines (30 December 1929 – 21 September 1998) was a German hurdler. He competed in the men's 110 metres hurdles at the 1956 Summer Olympics.
