= Wolfgang Troßbach =

German hurdler (1927–2021)

Personal information
- Nationality: German
- Born: 24 August 1927 Berlin, Germany
- Died: 5 December 2021 (aged 94) Bergisch Gladbach, Germany

Sport
- Sport: Track and field
- Event: 110 metres hurdles

Wolfgang Troßbach (24 August 1927 – 5 December 2021) was a German hurdler. He competed in the men's 110 metres hurdles at the 1952 Summer Olympics. Troßbach died in Bergisch Gladbach on 5 December 2021, at the age of 94.
