= Bob Joyce (athlete) =

Australian hurdler (1936–2025)

Personal information
- Nationality: Australian
- Born: James Robert Joyce; 3 November 1936
- Died: 11 July 2025 (aged 88)

Sport
- Sport: Track and field
- Event: 110 metres hurdles

James Robert Joyce (3 November 1936 – 11 July 2025) was an Australian hurdler. He competed in the men's 110 metres hurdles at the 1956 Summer Olympics. Joyce died on 11 July 2025, at the age of 88.
