= Arthur Barnard =

American sprinter and hurdler

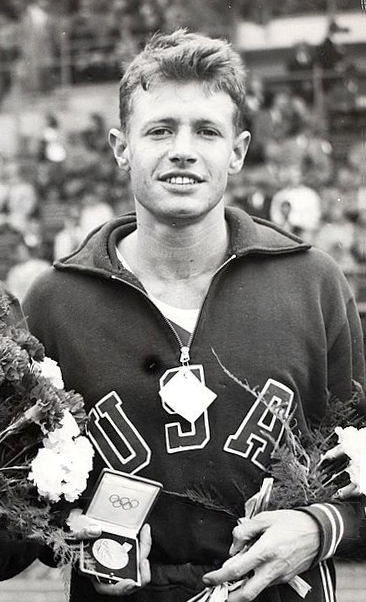
- Barnard at the 1952 Olympics

Personal information
- Born: March 10, 1929 Seattle, Washington, U.S.
- Died: May 1, 2018 (aged 89)
- Height: 180 cm (5 ft 11 in)
- Weight: 77 kg (170 lb)

Sport
- Sport: Athletics
- Events: 110 m, 400 m hurdles
- Club: Los Angeles Athletic Club; U.S. Navy

Achievements and titles
- Personal bests: 110 mH – 14.1 (1952); 400 mH – 53.9 (1954)
Medal record
Representing the United States
Olympic Games
Bronze medal – third place	1952 Helsinki	110 m hurdles

Arthur "Art" Barnard (March 10, 1929 – May 1, 2018) was an American sprinter. He competed mainly in the 110 m hurdles event, winning a bronze medal at the 1952 Olympics. Barnard attended the University of Southern California. Running for La Jolla High School, he finished second in the 120 yard high hurdles at the 1947 CIF California State Meet.

== Masters Track and Field ==
Barnard continued to compete into the newly emerging Masters division. In July 1970 Barnard (age 41) competed in the 120 yard high hurdles (36" tall) at the 3rd Annual Masters National Outdoor Track and Field Championship in San Diego, California winning in 15.1. Barnard's 15.1 represented a Masters American Record at the time.
