= Risto Syrjänen =

Finnish hurdler

Personal information
- Nationality: Finnish
- Born: 4 June 1925
- Died: 8 January 2016 (aged 90)

Sport
- Sport: Track and field
- Event: 110 metres hurdles

Risto Syrjänen (4 June 1925 – 8 January 2016) was a Finnish hurdler. He competed in the men's 110 metres hurdles at the 1952 Summer Olympics.
