= Martin Lauer =

West German sprinter (1937–2019)

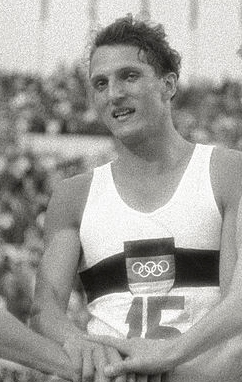
- Martin Lauer at the 1960 Olympics

Personal information
- Born: 2 January 1937 Cologne, Nordrhein-Westfalen, Nazi Germany
- Died: 6 October 2019 (aged 82)
- Height: 1.86 m (6 ft 1 in)
- Weight: 76 kg (168 lb)

Sport
- Sport: Athletics
- Event: 100 m
- Club: ASV Köln

Achievements and titles
- Personal bests: 100 m – 10.4 (1959); 200 m – 21.1 (1959); 110 mH – 13.2 (1959); 400 mH – 51.2 (1958); Dec – 7478 (1959)
Medal record
Men's athletics
Representing Germany
Olympic Games
Gold medal – first place	1960 Rome	4×100 m
Representing West Germany
European Championships
Gold medal – first place	1958 Stockholm	110 m hurdles

Karl Martin Lauer (German pronunciation: [ˈmaʁtiːn ˈlaʊɐ]; 2 January 1937 – 6 October 2019) was a West German sprinter who won a gold medal in the 4 × 100 m relay at the 1960 Summer Olympics.

== Biography ==
Lauer was a German champion in 110 m hurdles from 1956 to 1960 and in decathlon in 1956. At the 1956 Summer Olympics, he finished fourth in 110 m hurdles and fifth in decathlon. At the 1958 European Championships, he won the gold in 110 m hurdles. In 1958 Lauer also ran his first world record, in the 4 × 100 m relay. He set his second world record in 1959, this time in his main event of 110 m hurdles (13.2); this record stood until 1972. The same year he also set his personal best in decathlon and was ranked second in the world in this event. At the end of the year he was named Athlete of the Year by the sports magazine Track & Field News, the first ever of the annual election.

At the Rome Olympics Lauer was again fourth in 110 m hurdles and ran the anchoring leg for the German's 4 × 100 m relay team. In the final the Germans finished second behind the United States, but 15 minutes after the finish it was announced that the American team had been disqualified for an incorrect exchange. Germany's time, 39.5 seconds, equaled their own world record.

After the Olympics Lauer was forced to retire from sports – a non-sterile injection resulted in sepsis and prospects of leg amputation. While visiting Lauer in hospital, his girlfriend and brother had a car crash, with the girlfriend dying immediately and his brother several years later. After recovering Lauer became a country singer and sold a few million copies of his 40+ records. His single "Taxi nach Texas" was awarded the Silver Lion of Radio Luxembourg in 1964. Lauer attended the 1964 Olympics as a journalist and the 1972 Olympics as a representative of the Junghans Company. He later worked as director of the German company Triumph-Adler. Lauer died on 6 October 2019 at the age of 82.

Awards
Preceded by (Germany) Fritz Thiedemann	German Sportsman of the Year; 1959	Succeeded by (Germany) Georg Thoma
Preceded by —	Track & Field Athlete of the Year; 1959	Succeeded by (United States) Rafer Johnson
