= Yevhen Bulanchyk =

Ukrainian athlete

Medal record

Men's athletics

Representing Soviet Union

European Championships
Gold medal – first place	1954 Bern	110 m hurdles

Yevgeniy Bulanchik (3 April 1922 – 17 November 1995) was a Ukrainian and Soviet former athlete who competed in the 1952 Summer Olympics. Honoured Master of Sports (1955), Honoured Coach of Ukraine (1962), Honoured Coach of the Soviet Union (1968), Doctor Candidate of Pedagogical Sciences (1975). Docent of the Kyiv Institute of Physical Culture, Department of Athletics (1974–1984). 11x Soviet champion. First coach Z.Synytskyi. Bulanchyk coached the European champion Vyacheslav Skomorokhov. Bulanchyk was a Ukrainian republican coach in athletics (1958–1980) and a Soviet national coach in athletics (1960–76).
