= Giovanni Ghiselli =

Italian sprinter (1934–1997)

Personal information
- National team: Italy
- Born: 15 November 1934 Novara, Italy
- Died: 26 February 1997 (aged 62)

Sport
- Sport: Athletics
- Event: Sprint

Achievements and titles
- Personal best: 100 m: 10.6 (1956)
Medal record
Mediterranean Games
Gold medal – first place	1955 Barcelona	4×100 metres relay

Giovanni Ghiselli (15 November 1934 – 26 February 1997) was an Italian sprinter who won three gold medals in one edition of Mediterranean Games. He was born in Novara.

He was finalist with the national relay team on 4×100 metres relay at the 1956 Summer Olympics (4th place).

== Biography ==
Ghiselli participated at one edition of the Summer Olympics (1956). He had 7 caps in national team from 1953 to 1958.

== Achievements ==
Year	Competition	Venue	Position	Event	Performance	Note
1954	European Championships	(Switzerland) Bern	4th	4 × 100 m relay	41.9	
1955	Mediterranean Games	(Spain) Barcelona	1st	4×100 metres relay	41.0	
1956	Olympic Games	(Australia) Melbourne	Heat	200 metres	22.5	
1956	Olympic Games	(Australia) Melbourne	4th	4 × 100 metres relay	40.3	

== See also ==
- Italy national relay team
