= Anatoly Mikhaylov (hurdler) =

Soviet hurdler (1936–2022)

Personal information
- Born: 14 September 1936 Leningrad, Soviet Union
- Died: 13 June 2022 (aged 85) Saint Petersburg, Russia

Sport
- Sport: Track and field
Medal record
Men's athletics
Representing Soviet Union
Olympic Games
| Bronze medal – third place | 1964 Tokyo | 110 m hurdles |
European Championships
| Gold medal – first place | 1962 Belgrade | 110 m hurdles |
| Bronze medal – third place | 1958 Stockholm | 110 m hurdles |
Summer Universiade
| Gold medal – first place | 1961 Sofia | 4x100m relay |
| Gold medal – first place | 1963 Porto Alegre | 110m hurdles |

Anatoly Arkadyevich Mikhaylov (Russian: Анатолий Аркадьевич Михайлов; 14 September 1936 – 13 June 2022) was a Soviet athlete.

He competed mainly in the 110-metre hurdles. He trained in Leningrad at Zenit and later at VSS Trud.

He competed for the USSR in the 1964 Summer Olympics held in Tokyo, Japan, in the 110-metre hurdles where he won the bronze medal.
