= Corazzano =

- Frazione
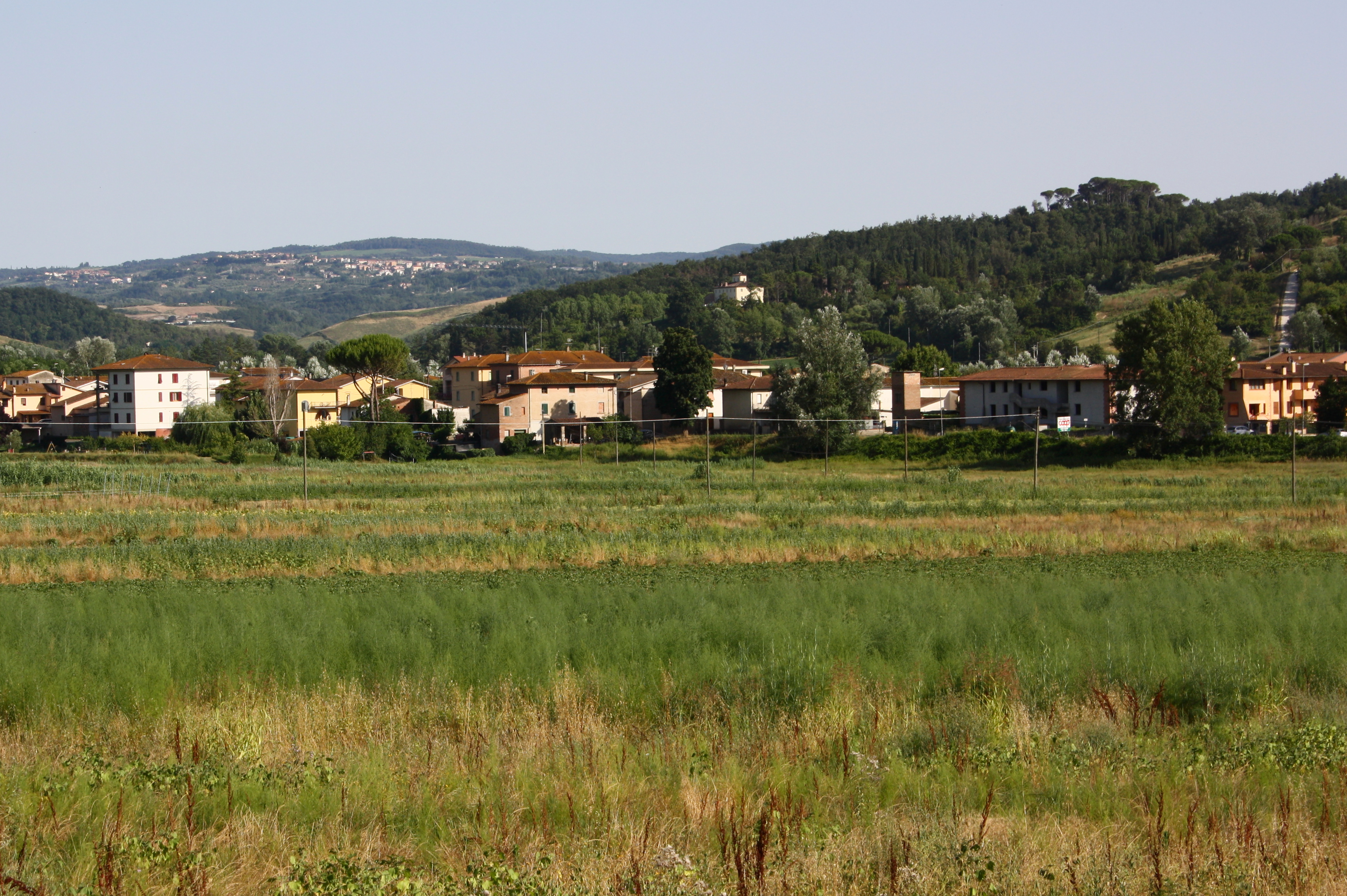

- Location of Corazzano in Italy
- Coordinates: 43°37′16″N 10°52′3″E
- Country: Italy
- Region: Tuscany
- Province: Pisa (PI)
- Comune: San Miniato
- Elevation: 54 m (177 ft)

Population (2011)
  - Total: 460
- Demonym: Corazzanesi
- Time zone: UTC+1 (CET)
  - Summer (DST): UTC+2 (CEST)
- Postal code: 56028
- Dialing code: (+39) 0571

Corazzano is a village in Tuscany, central Italy, administratively a frazione of the comune of San Miniato, province of Pisa. At the time of the 2001 census its population was 331.

Corazzano is about 50 km from Pisa and 15 km from San Miniato.
