= Emad El-Din Shafei =

Egyptian sprinter (1931–1961)

Personal information
- Nationality: Egyptian
- Born: 29 October 1931
- Died: 16 March 1961 (aged 29)

Sport
- Sport: Sprinting
- Event: 100 metres

Emad El-Din Shafei (29 October 1931 – 16 March 1961) was an Egyptian sprinter. He competed in the men's 100 metres at the 1952 Summer Olympics.
