= Edmond Roudnitska (athlete) =

French hurdler (1931–2023)

Personal information
- Full name: Edmond Pierre Félix Roudnitska
- Nationality: French
- Born: 26 June 1931 Argenteuil, Val-d'Oise, France
- Died: 31 January 2023 (aged 91) Paris, France
- Parent: Edmond Roudnitska (father)

Sport
- Sport: Track and field
- Event: 110 metres hurdles

Edmond Pierre Félix Roudnitska (26 June 1931 – 31 January 2023) was a French hurdler. He competed in the 110 metres hurdles at the 1952, 1956 and the 1960 Summer Olympics.

== See also ==
- Athletics at the 1952 Summer Olympics – Men's 110 metres hurdles
- Athletics at the 1956 Summer Olympics – Men's 110 metres hurdles
- Athletics at the 1960 Summer Olympics – Men's 110 metres hurdles
