= Michitaka Kinami =

Japanese hurdler (1920–2008)

Personal information
- Nationality: Japanese
- Born: 23 October 1920 Osaka Prefecture, Japan
- Died: 8 June 2008 (aged 87)

Sport
- Sport: Track and field
- Event: 110 metres hurdles

Michitaka Kinami (木南 道孝, Kinami Michitaka; 23 October 1920 – 8 June 2008) was a Japanese hurdler. He competed in the men's 110 metres hurdles at the 1952 Summer Olympics.
