= Lee Calhoun =

American athlete

Personal information
- Full name: Lee Quincy Calhoun
- Born: February 23, 1933 Laurel, Mississippi, U.S.
- Died: June 21, 1989 (aged 56) Erie, Pennsylvania, U.S.
Medal record
Men's athletics
Representing United States
Olympic Games
| Gold medal – first place | 1956 Melbourne | 110 m Hurdles |
| Gold medal – first place | 1960 Rome | 110 m Hurdles |

Lee Quincy Calhoun (February 23, 1933 – June 21, 1989) was an American athlete, a double winner of 110 m hurdles at the Olympic Games.

== Biography ==
Born in Laurel, Mississippi, Lee Calhoun graduated from Roosevelt High School in Gary, Indiana before representing North Carolina Central University, won the NCAA 120 yd hurdles in 1956 and 1957. He also won the AAU championships in 110 m hurdles in 1956 and 1959 and in 120 yd hurdles in 1957.

At the 1956 Summer Olympics Calhoun surprisingly improved his personal best in 110 m by almost a full second in a final. He ran 13.5 to win the gold medal, edging teammate Jack Davis with a lunge that just got his shoulder across the line in front. He had learned the maneuver from Davis.

Calhoun was suspended in 1958 for receiving gifts on Bride and Groom, a television game show, and seemed to be past his prime for the 1960 Summer Olympics. But shortly before the Rome Olympics, he tied the world record of 13.2 and went to the Olympic Games as a main favourite. In the final, he won in 13.98, beating teammate Willie May by 0.01 seconds.

After retiring from competition, he became a college track coach, first at Grambling State University, then at Yale, and finally at Western Illinois University. He was an assistant Olympic coach at the 1976 Summer Olympics.

He was elected to the United States National Track and Field Hall of Fame in 1974.

Lee Calhoun died in Erie, Pennsylvania, aged 56.

== Bibliography ==
- "Obituaries: Lee Calhoun, 56, a Star Hurdler". The New York Times. Associated Press. June 22, 1989. Archived from the original on April 26, 2012.
- Evans, Hilary; Gjerde, Arild; Heijmans, Jeroen; Mallon, Bill; et al. "Lee Calhoun". Olympics at Sports-Reference.com. Sports Reference LLC. Archived from the original on October 24, 2012.
- "USATF Hall of Fame: Lee Calhoun". USA Track & Field. Archived from the original on November 25, 2012.
