= Fawzi Chaaban =

Egyptian sprinter

Personal information
- Nationality: Egyptian
- Born: 7 October 1930
- Died: 10 May 1992 (aged 61)

Sport
- Sport: Sprinting
- Event: 100 metres

Fawzi Chaaban (7 October 1930 – 10 May 1992) was an Egyptian sprinter. He competed in the men's 100 metres at the 1952 Summer Olympics.
