= Pedro Apellániz =

Spanish javelin thrower

Personal information
- Nationality: Spanish
- Born: 8 February 1924 Galdakao, Spain
- Died: 22 April 2013 (aged 89) Galdakao, Spain

Sport
- Sport: Athletics
- Event: Javelin throw

Pedro Apellániz Zarraga (8 February 1924 – 22 April 2013) was a Spanish athlete. He competed in the men's javelin throw at the 1948 Summer Olympics.
