= Jean-Claude Bernard =

French hurdler (1933–2022)

Personal information
- Nationality: French
- Born: 30 April 1933 Paris, France
- Died: 25 October 2022 (aged 89) Juvisy-sur-Orge, France

Sport
- Sport: Track and field
- Event: 110 metres hurdles

Jean-Claude Francois Leon Bernard (30 April 1933 – 25 October 2022) was a French hurdler. He competed in the men's 110 metres hurdles at the 1956 Summer Olympics. Bernard died on 25 October 2022, at the age of 89.
