= Marthe Djian =

Personal information
- Nationality: France
- Born: 6 March 1936 (age 89) Paris, France

Sport
- Event(s): Long Jump, 80 metres Hurdles

Marthe Djian (née Lambert; born 6 March 1936) is a French former athlete, who specialized in the Long jump and 80m hurdles.

== Biography ==
Djian won five French championship athletic championships: two in the Long jump in 1956 and 1958, two in the 80m hurdles in 1956 and 1958, and one in the pentathlon in 1955. She improved seven times the French record in the long jump, bringing it to 6.13m in 1958.

Djian participated in the 1956 Olympic Games, at Melbourne. A semifinalist in the 80m hurdles, she took fifth place in the Long jump, jumping 5.88m.

Marthe Djian married René Djian (a Semi Finalist in the Olympics in the 800m). Her daughter, Mary, was selected by the French Combined Athletic Events Team while her youngest son, Francis, became indoor 400m champion of France in 2012 (Veteran). Her granddaughter, Soliane, was Vice-Champion in the Canadian Junior indoor 200m championship.

=== Prize list ===
- French Championships in Athletics :
  - winner of the long jump 1956 and 1958
  - winner of the 80m hurdles in 1956 and 1958
  - winner of the pentathlon 1955

=== Records ===
personal records
Event	Performance	Location	Date
Long jump	6.13m		1958

== Sources ==
- Docathlé2003, Fédération française d'athlétisme, 2003, p. 413
- Siukonen, Markku & Ahola, Matti (1990), Sporttikustannus Oy (ed.), Suuri EM-kirja, Sporttikustannus, pp. 57, 67, ISBN 951-8920-11-7
- Wallechinsky, David (1988), The Complete Book of the Olympics, Penguin Books, p. 156, ISBN 0-14-010771-1
