= Giulio Chiesa =

Italian pole vaulter

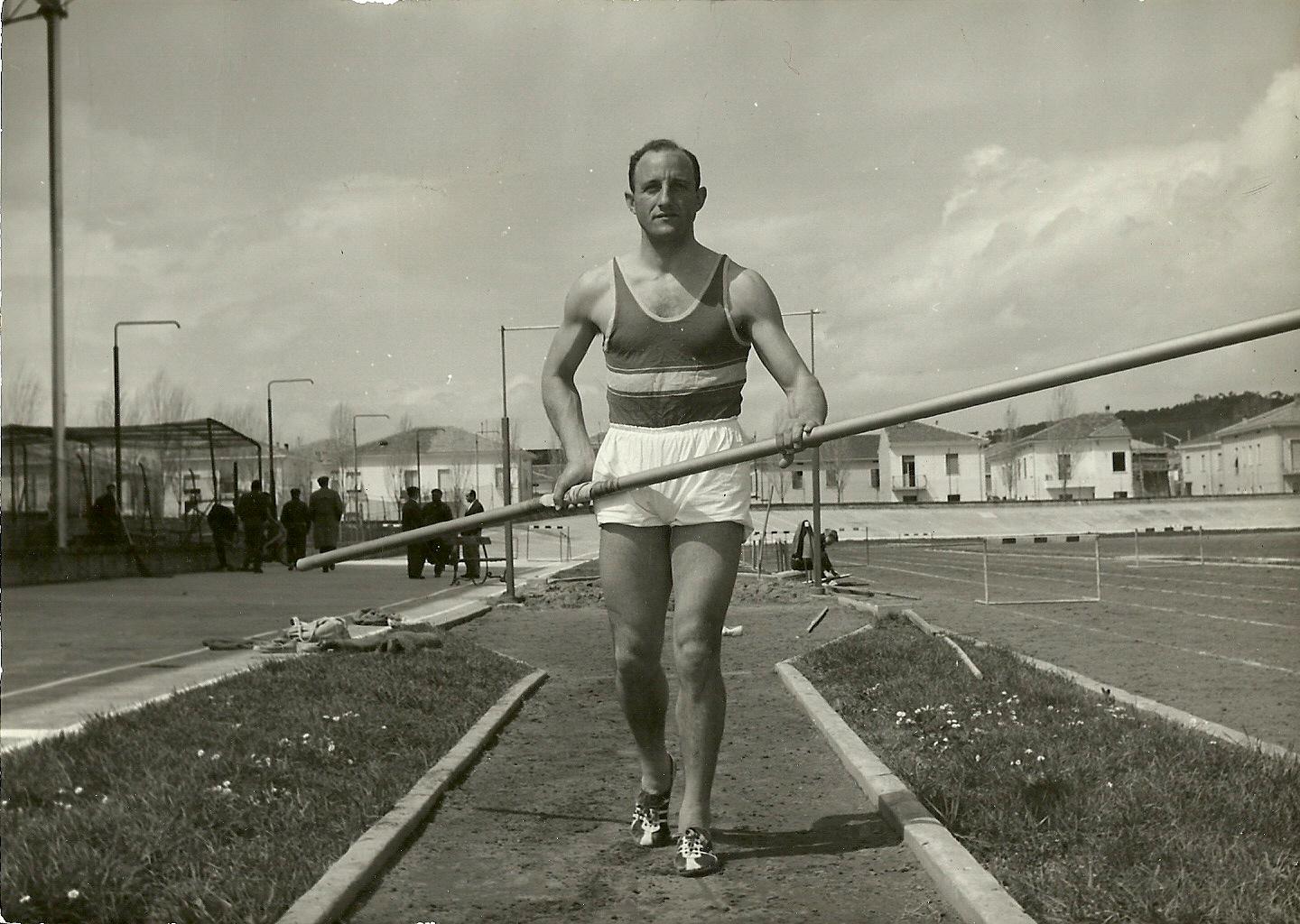

Personal information
- Nationality: Italian
- Born: 23 April 1928 La Spezia, Italy
- Died: 13 July 2010 (aged 82) Florence, Italy
- Height: 1.83 m (6 ft 0 in)
- Weight: 76 kg (168 lb)

Sport
- Country: Italy
- Sport: Athletics
- Event: Pole vault
- Club: G.S. Fiamme Gialle

Achievements and titles
- Personal best: Pole vault: 4.35 (1936)
Medal record
Mediterranean Games
Gold medal – first place	1955 Barcelona	Pole vault

Giulio Chiesa (23 April 1928 – 13 July 2010) was an Italian pole vaulter who competed in the 1956 Summer Olympics.

== Biography ==
Chiesa has 19 caps in national team from 1950 to 1960.

Chiesa finished second behind Torfi Bryngeirsson in the pole vault event at the British 1951 AAA Championships.

Chiesa became General of the Guardia di Finanza, Giulio Chiesa has died at the age of 82 years.

== Olympic results ==
Year	Competition	Venue	Position	Event	Performance	Note
1956	Olympic Games	(Australia) Melbourne	9th	Pole vault	4.15 m	

== National records ==
- Pole vault: 4.35 m ( (Italy) Rome, 7 October 1956)
