= Sri Chand Ram =

Indian hurdler (born 1934)

Personal information
- Nationality: Indian
- Born: 1934 (age 91–92)

Sport
- Sport: Track and field
- Event: 110 metres hurdles

Sri Chand Ram (born 1934) is an Indian hurdler. He competed in the men's 110 metres hurdles at the 1956 Summer Olympics. His personal best was 110H-14.4 in 1960. Chand Ram also served in the Rajputana Rifles in the Indian Army.
