= Konstantinos Sfikas =

Greek triple jumper (born 1937)

Personal information
- Nationality: Greek
- Born: 24 October 1937 (age 88)

Sport
- Sport: Athletics
- Event: Triple jump

Konstantinos Sfikas (born 24 October 1937) is a Greek athlete. He competed in the men's triple jump at the 1960 Summer Olympics.
