= Joel Shankle =

American athlete (1933–2015)

Personal information
- Born: March 2, 1933 Fines Creek, North Carolina, U.S.
- Died: April 8, 2015 (aged 82) Culpeper, Virginia, U.S.
Medal record
Men's athletics
Representing the United States
Olympic Games
Bronze medal – third place	1956 Melbourne	110 metre hurdles

Joel Shankle (March 2, 1933 – April 8, 2015) was an American athlete who competed mainly in the 110 meter hurdles. He competed for the United States in the 1956 Summer Olympics held in Melbourne, Australia in the 110 meter hurdles where he won a bronze medal. Shankle attended Duke University and was honored as the first ACC Male Athlete of the Year in 1954. He was also a graduate of Randolph-Macon Academy, which honored him as their Distinguished Alumnus of the Year in 2013.

Shankle subsequently joined the U.S. Navy where he flew the A-4 Skyhawk before becoming a captain for American Airlines. In his spare time he built an Sequoia Falco aircraft, which he flew in retirement.

Awards
Preceded by N/A	ACC Male Athlete of the Year; 1954	Succeeded by Dickie Hemric
