= Olivier Bernard (athlete) =

Swiss hurdler (1921–1967)

Personal information
- Nationality: Swiss
- Born: Olivier Guillaume Bernard; 26 March 1921
- Died: 18 May 1967 (aged 46) Bern, Switzerland

Sport
- Sport: Track and field
- Event: 110 metres hurdles

Olivier Guillaume Bernard (26 March 1921 – 18 May 1967) was a Swiss hurdler. He competed in the 110 metres hurdles at the 1948 Summer Olympics and the 1952 Summer Olympics. Bernard died in Bern on 18 May 1967, at the age of 46.
