= Luigi Gnocchi =

Italian sprinter (1933–2014)

Personal information
- Nationality: Italian
- Born: 14 January 1933 Gallarate, Italy
- Died: 18 October 2014 (aged 81) Gallarate, Italy

Sport
- Country: Italy
- Sport: Athletics
- Event: Sprint
- Club: Gallaratese

Achievements and titles
- Personal best: 100 m: 10.4 (1956)
Medal record
Mediterranean Games
Gold medal – first place	1955 Barcelona	100 metres
Gold medal – first place	1955 Barcelona	200 metres
Gold medal – first place	1955 Barcelona	4×100 metres relay

Luigi Gnocchi (14 January 1933 – 18 October 2014) was an Italian sprinter, that won three gold medals in one single edition of Mediterranean Games. He was born in Gallarate. He was finalist with the national relay team on 4×100 metres relay at the 1956 Summer Olympics (4th place).

== Biography ==
Gnocchi participated at one edition of the Summer Olympics (1956), he has 11 caps in national team from 1953 to 1956.

== National records ==
- 100 metres: 10.4 ( (Italy) Rome, 29 September 1956)

== Achievements ==
Year	Competition	Venue	Position	Event	Performance	Note
1954	European Championships	(Switzerland) Bern	4th	4 × 100 m relay	41.9	
1956	Olympic Games	(Australia) Melbourne	QF	100 metres	10.8	
1956	Olympic Games	(Australia) Melbourne	4th	4 × 100 metres relay	40.3	

== National titles ==
Gnocchi won the individual national championship five times.

- 3 wins on 100 metres (1954, 1955, 1956)
- 2 wins on 200 metres (1955, 1956)

== See also ==
- 100 metres winners of Italian Athletics Championships
- 200 metres winners of Italian Athletics Championships
- Italy national relay team
