= René Djian =

French middle-distance runner (1927–2024)

Personal information
- Born: 1 February 1927 Paris, France
- Died: 11 November 2024 (aged 97) Erquy, France

Sport
- Sport: Middle-distance running
- Event: 800 metres

René Djian (1 February 1927 – 11 November 2024) was a French middle-distance runner. He competed in the 800 metres at the 1952 Summer Olympics and the 1956 Summer Olympics. He was married to Marthe Djian. René Djian died in Erquy on 11 November 2024, at the age of 97.
