= Jack Parker (hurdler) =

British hurdler (1927–2022)

Personal information
- Nationality: British (English)
- Born: 6 September 1927 East Sheen, London, England
- Died: 20 February 2022 (aged 94)
- Height: 188 cm (6 ft 2 in)
- Weight: 86 kg (190 lb)

Sport
- Sport: Athletics
- Event: hurdles
- Club: South London Harriers
Medal record
Men's athletics
Representing Great Britain
European Championships
Silver medal – second place	1954 Berne	110 m hurdles

Frederick John Parker (6 September 1927 – 20 February 2022) was a British international hurdler known informally as Jumpin’ Jack Flash.

== Athletics career ==
Parker became the British 120 yards hurdles champion after winning the British AAA Championships title at the 1951 AAA Championships.

Parker finished second behind Peter Hildreth in the 220 yards AAAs in 1952 and shortly afterwards he represented the Great Britain team at the 1952 Olympic Games in Helsinki.

Parker regained his 120 yards AAA title at the 1954 AAA Championships and the following month represented the England team at the 1954 British Empire and Commonwealth Games in Vancouver in the 120 yards hurdles. He was also the silver medallist in the 110 metres hurdles at the 1954 European Athletics Championships.

Parker won a third AAA title at the 1955 AAA Championships. In 1956, Parker represented Great Britain again at the 1956 Olympic Games in Melbourne.

== Personal life and death ==
Jackson had a successful career as a civil engineer.

Parker died on 20 February 2022, at the age of 94. He was survived by his wife, Shirley, as well as their children and grandchildren.
