= Vincenzo Lombardo =

Italian sprinter

Personal information
- Nationality: Italian
- Born: 21 January 1932 Santo Stefano di Camastra, Italy
- Died: 2 December 2007 (aged 75) Milan, Italy
- Height: 1.80 m (5 ft 11 in)
- Weight: 78 kg (172 lb)

Sport
- Country: Italy
- Sport: Athletics
- Event: Sprint
- Club: G.S. Fiamme Gialle

Achievements and titles
- Personal bests: 100: 10.7 (1955); 200: 21.1 (1955); 400: 47.2 (1960)
Medal record
Mediterranean Games
Silver medal – second place	1955 Barcelona	200 metres
Silver medal – second place	1955 Barcelona	4x400 metres relay
Bronze medal – third place	1955 Barcelona	400 metres

Vincenzo Lombardo (21 January 1932, in Santo Stefano di Camastra – 2 December 2007, in Milan) was an Italian sprinter.

== Biography ==
Vincenzo Lombardo won three medals at the International athletics competitions. He participated at two editions of the Summer Olympics (1952 and 1956), he has 14 caps in national team from 1955 to 1960.

After a successful career in athletics, he became a General of "Guardia de Finanza" and was active against criminals. He eventually went back to sports, starting as a sports manager and then rising up as a Chairman of FIDAL Regional Committee in Lombardi.

One of his two daughters, Patrizia and Rossana, was also in sports, representing Italy in 100m and 400m hurdles.

== Olympic results ==
Year	Competition	Venue	Position	Event	Performance	Notes
1952	Olympic Games	(Finland) Helsinki	Heat	400 metres	49.3	
1956	Olympic Games	(Australia) Melbourne	QF	200 metres	21.4	
1956	Olympic Games	(Australia) Melbourne	4th	4×100 metres relay	40.3	

== National titles ==
Vincenzo Lombardo has won 3 time the individual national championship.

- 3 wins in the 400 metres (1952, 1954, 1955)

== See also ==
- Italy national relay team
