= Alain David (sprinter) =

French sprinter (1932–2022)

Alain David (26 January 1932 – 24 July 2022) was a French sprinter who competed in the 1956 Summer Olympics. He was born in Luxembourg City.
