= Luigi Grossi =

Italian sprinter (1925–2008)

Personal information
- Nationality: Italian
- Born: 10 May 1925 Milan, Italy
- Died: 14 August 2008 (aged 83) Milan, Italy

Sport
- Sport: Sprinting
- Event: 200 metres

Luigi Grossi (10 May 1925 – 14 August 2008) was an Italian sprinter. He competed in the men's 200 metres at the 1952 Summer Olympics.
