= Harrison Dillard =

American athlete (1923–2019)

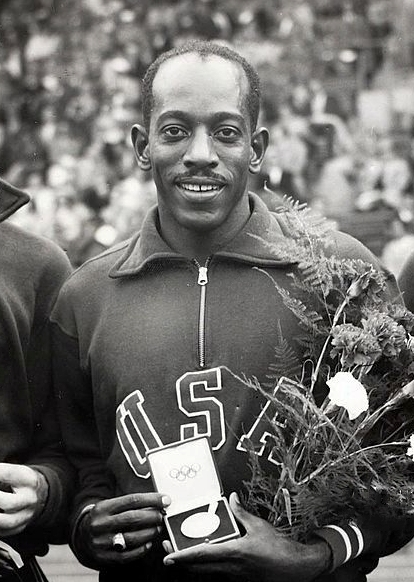
- Dillard at 1952 Summer Olympics

Personal information
- Full name: William Harrison Dillard
- Born: July 8, 1923 Cleveland, Ohio, U.S.
- Died: November 15, 2019 (aged 96) Cleveland, Ohio, U.S.
- Height: 5 ft 10 in (178 cm)
- Weight: 152 lb (69 kg)

Sport
- Sport: Athletics
- Events: 100 m, 200 m 110 m, 400 m hurdles
- Club: Baldwin-Wallace College

Achievements and titles
- Personal bests: 100 m – 10.50 (1948); 200 m – 20.8 (1948); 110 mH – 13.6 (1948); 400 mH – 53.7 (1942)
Medal record
Men's athletics
Representing the United States
Olympic Games
Gold medal – first place	1948 London	100 m
Gold medal – first place	1948 London	4 × 100 m relay
Gold medal – first place	1952 Helsinki	110 m hurdles
Gold medal – first place	1952 Helsinki	4 × 100 m relay

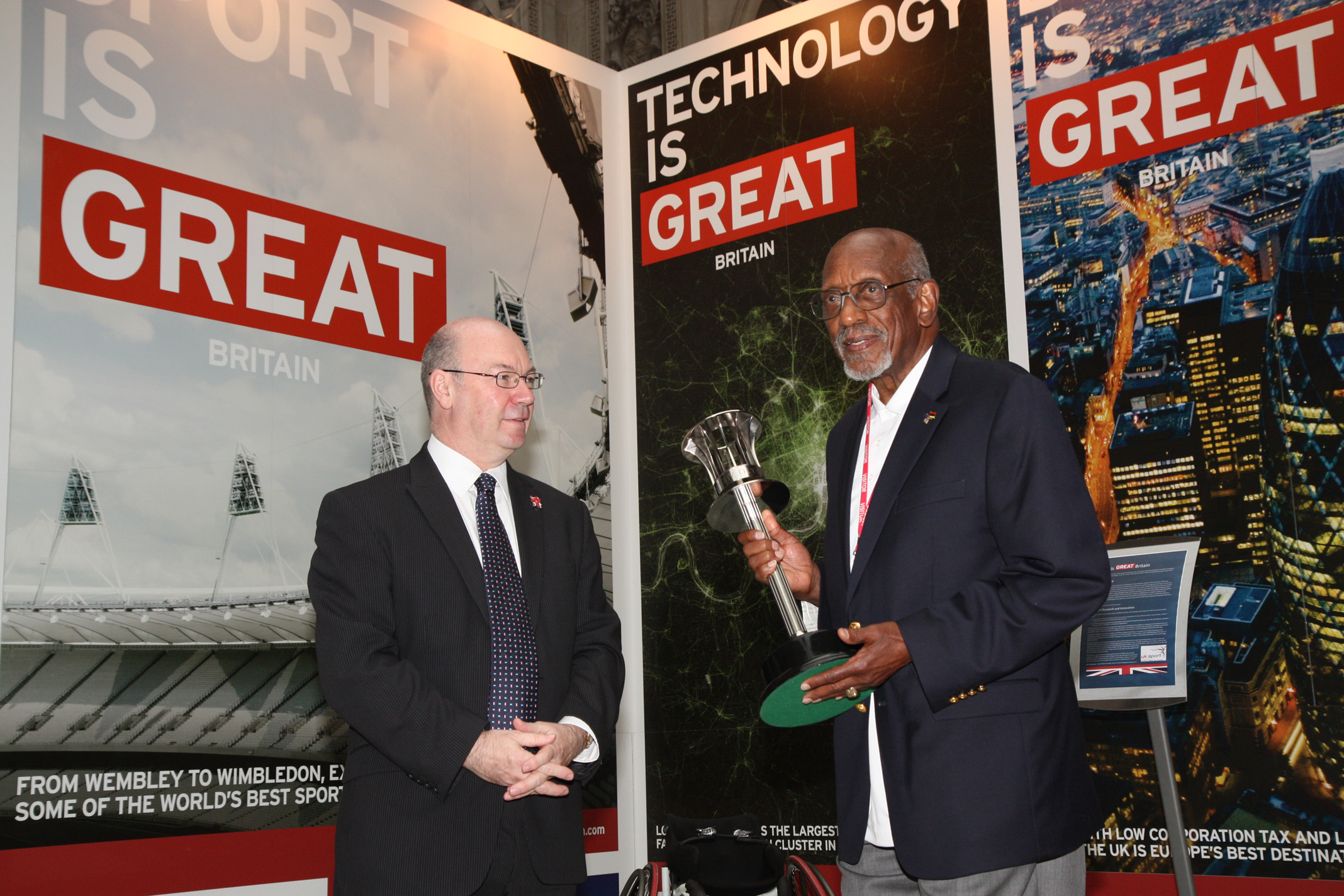
Foreign Office Minister Alistair Burt with Harrison Dillard holding the 1948 London Olympics torch, August 1, 2012.

William Harrison "Bones" Dillard (July 8, 1923 – November 15, 2019) was an American track and field athlete, who is the only male in the history of the Olympic Games to win gold in both the 100 meter (sprints) and the 110 meter hurdles, making him the “World’s Fastest Man” in 1948 and the “World’s Fastest Hurdler” in 1952.

== Early life and career ==
Dillard was born in Cleveland, Ohio, on July 8, 1923, and attended East Technical High School. He entered Baldwin-Wallace College in 1941 and joined Pi Lambda Phi International Fraternity, and two years later was drafted into the U.S. Army, serving in the all-black 92nd Infantry Division known as the Buffalo Soldiers.

According to a 1962 article written by Trinidadian Olympic sprinter Mike Agostini for Australia's The Age newspaper, Dillard was first inspired as a youngster by Charley Paddock, who Agostini says visited Dillard at his high school and encouraged him to follow his dream of becoming an Olympic champion like himself.

Dillard returned to college in 1946, and resumed athletics, inspired by Jesse Owens, who, like him, was from Cleveland and had attended East Technical High School. He won the NCAA and AAU 120-yard and 220-yard hurdles in both 1946 and 1947, tying world records in both events with a 22.3 in the 220 in 1946 and a 13.6 in the 120. Between June 1947 and June 1948, he remained unbeaten in 82 consecutive finals, a record until broken by Ed Moses.

== Olympic Games ==
Official Video Highlights, Dillard winning 1948 100 meters Dillard winning 1952 110 meters hurdles

At the trials for the 1948 Summer Olympics, Dillard failed to qualify for the 110 m hurdles event, but qualified for the 100 m after finishing third.

At the Games, Dillard reached the final, which seemed to end in a dead heat between Dillard and another American, Barney Ewell. The finish photo showed Dillard had won, equalling the World record as well. This was the first use of a photo finish at an Olympic Games. As a member of the 4 × 100 m relay team, he won another gold medal at the London Games.

Four years later, still a strong hurdler, Dillard did qualify for the 110 m hurdles event, and won the event in Helsinki. Another 4 × 100 m relay victory yielded Dillard's fourth Olympic title. Dillard attempted to qualify for a third Olympics in 1956, but failed (finishing seventh in the trials final). Earlier he took part in and won the gold medal in the 110 m hurdles at the 1953 Maccabiah Games.

== Later years ==
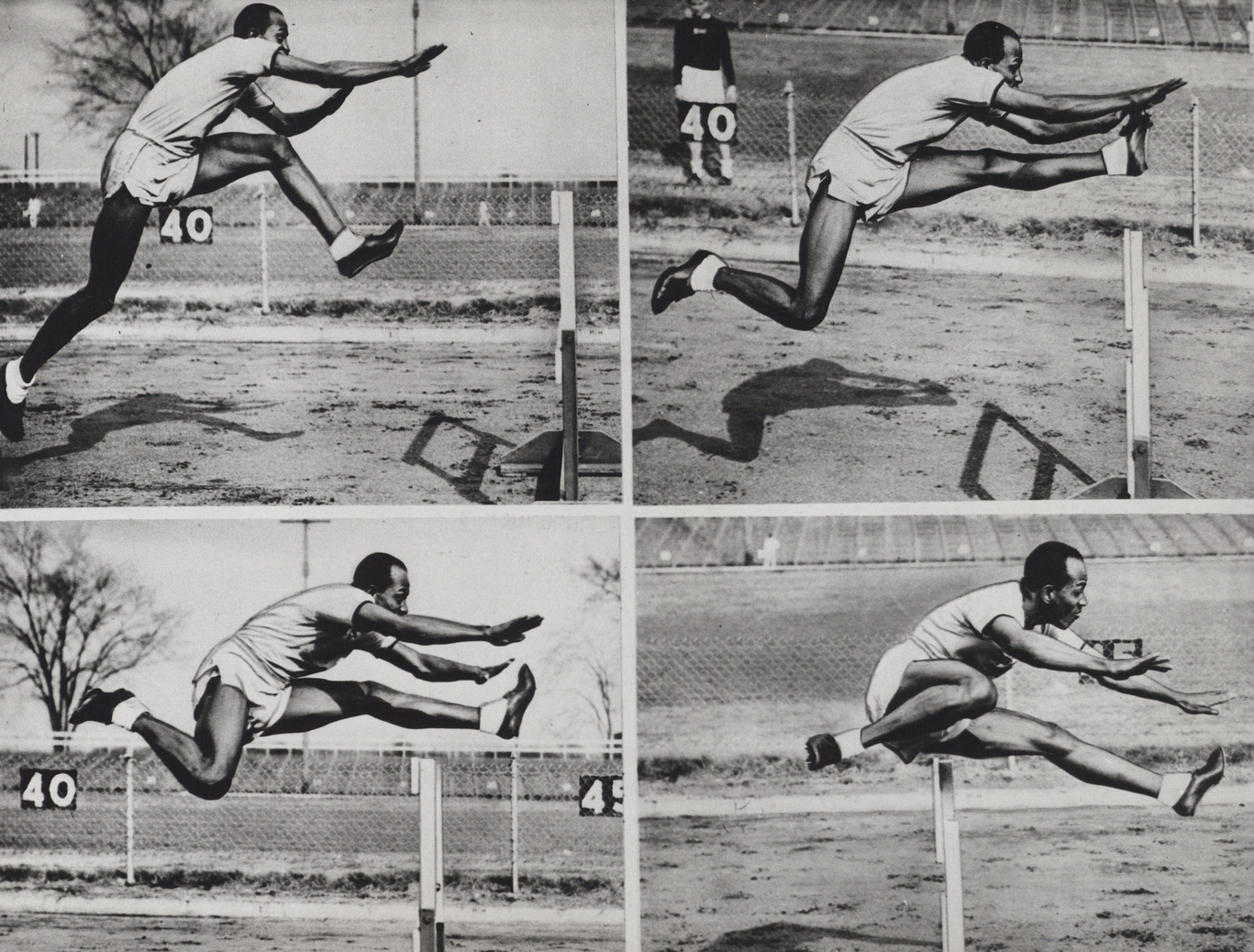
Harrison Dillard's jump

Dillard worked for the Cleveland Indians baseball franchise in scouting and public relations capacities, and hosted a radio talk show on Cleveland's WERE. He also worked for the Cleveland City School District for many years as its business manager. Dillard died on November 15, 2019, at the age of 96, of stomach cancer. At the time of his death he was the United States' oldest living Olympic gold medalist.

== Competition record ==
Year	Competition	Venue	Position	Event	Notes
Representing United States
1948	Olympics	London, England	1st	100 m	10.3 (=OR)
1948	Olympics	London, England	1st	4 × 100 m relay	40.6
1952	Olympics	Helsinki, Finland	1st	110 m hurdles	13.9 (OR)
1952	Olympics	Helsinki, Finland	1st	4 × 100 m relay	40.1

== Awards and honors ==
- Four-time Olympic Gold Medalist
- U.S. Olympic Hall of Fame inductee
- James E. Sullivan Award winner, in 1955
- Statue at Baldwin Wallace University
- Track at Baldwin Wallace named the Harrison Dillard Track
- United States National Track and Field Hall of Fame inductee in 1974 (the inaugural year)
- IAAF Hall of Fame inductee, in 2013.
- Harrison Dillard Trail, traveling through Cleveland's Rockefeller Park from Lake Erie to University Circle, dedicated in 1997.

== World Rankings ==
Dillard was ranked among the best in the world in both the 100 m/100 y sprint and 110 m/120 y sprint hurdle events from 1947 to 1953, according to the votes of the experts of Track and Field News. (Note: Rankings started in 1947.)

Year	World rank 100 m	World rank 110 m hurdles
1947	9th	1st
1948	1st	2nd
1949	7th	2nd
1950	-	-
1951	-	-
1952	-	1st
1953	-	6th

== World Records ==
Dillard in his career posted the following world record and world best times. (Note: 120 yards is 109.73m, a difference of 27 cm with 110 m. This means for record purposes there is no conversion factor applied for hand-timing when converting between times recorded for the two distances.) (Note: 200 m/220 y hurdle events over a turn were accepted as world records to 1 January 1959; 200 m/220 y hurdle events were removed as world record events in 1969.)

Dillard achieved the following world records during his track career:

- 120 y (110 m) hurdles of 13.6 s in Lawrence at the Kansas Relays on 17 April 1948;
- 220 y hurdles (straight course) of 22.5 s in Delaware on 8 June 1946;
- 220 y hurdles (straight course) of 22.3 s in Salt Lake City on 21 June 1947.

He also ran the following world best times that were never ratified by the sport's governing body, the IAAF:

- 220 y hurdles (turn) of 23.0 s in Minneapolis on 22 June 1946;
- 220 y hurdles (straight course) of 22.5 s in Berea, Ohio on 20 May 1947.
