= Boris Stolyarov =

Personal information
- Born: 20 July 1932 Nizhny Novgorod, Russian SFSR, Soviet Union
- Died: 15 October 2009 (aged 77) Kremyonki, Kaluga Oblast, Russia
- Height: 1.83 m (6 ft 0 in)
- Weight: 82 kg (181 lb)

Sport
- Sport: Hurdles
- Club: Trudovye reservy
Medal record
Representing the Soviet Union
Summer Universiade
Gold medal – first place	1954 Budapest	110 m hurdles

Boris Vasilyevich Stolyarov (Russian: Борис Васильевич Столяров; 20 July 1932 – 15 October 2009) was a Russian track and field athlete. He competed in the 110 m hurdles at the 1956 Summer Olympics and finished in sixth place. He won this event at the 1954 Summer Universiade and at the Soviet championships in 1956. He was selected for the 1960 Olympics, but could not compete due to a leg injury and helped the Soviet athletics team as a masseur. Around that time he briefly switched from athletics to boxing, twice becoming the heavyweight champion of Saint Petersburg.

He was born in Nizhny Novgorod, but since young age traveled across Russia with his family up to Far East. He graduated from school in Volgograd and from the Institute of Physical Education in Saint Petersburg, where he started training in athletics. After retirement from competitions, for many decades he worked as an athletics coach in Severodvinsk, where he headed the local sports federation between 1978 and 1989.
