= Jacques Dohen =

French hurdler (1930–2005)

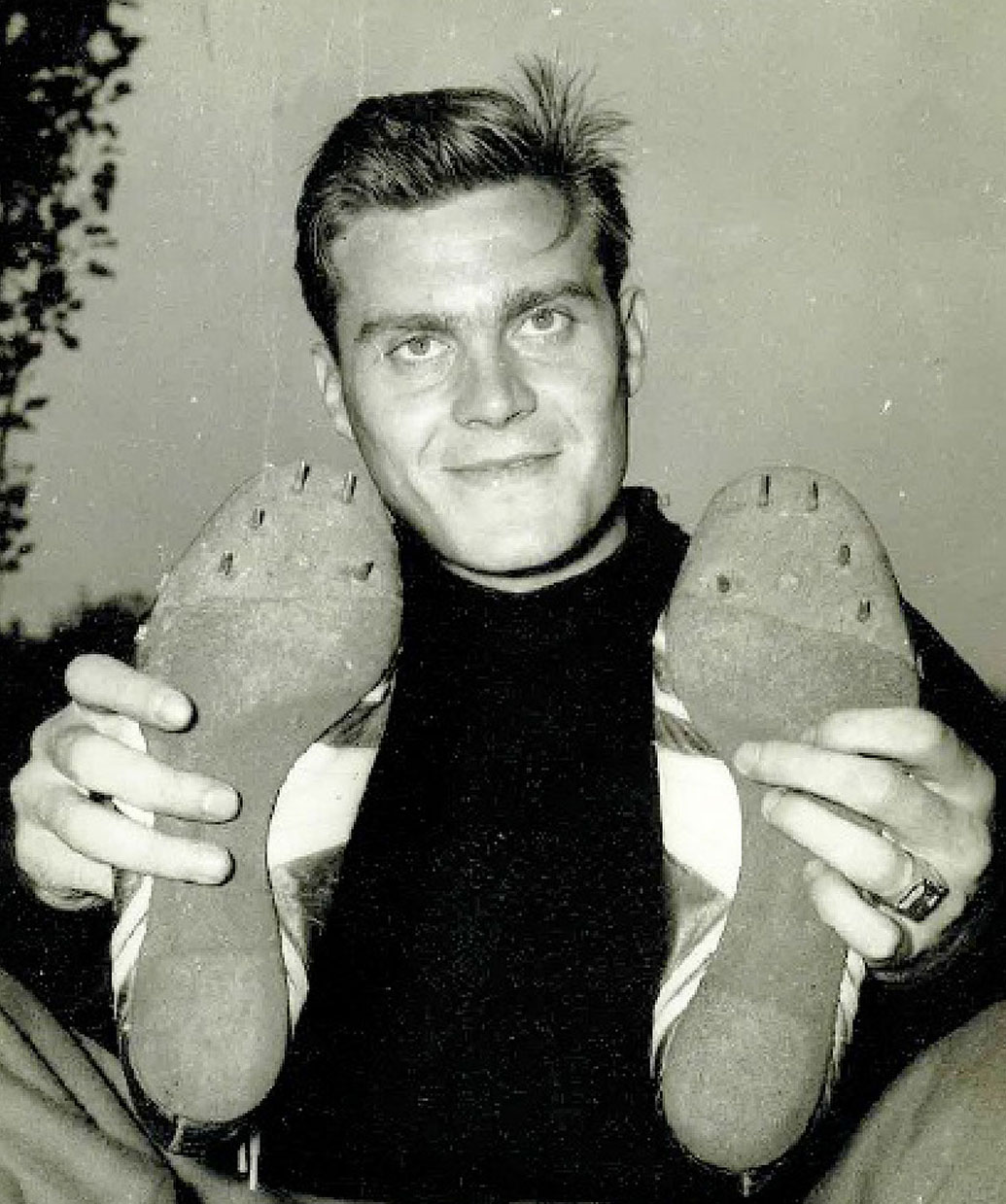
- Jacques Dohen

Personal information
- Nationality: French
- Born: 4 May 1930
- Died: 9 May 2005 (aged 75)

Sport
- Sport: Track and field
- Event: 110 metres hurdles

Jacques Dohen (4 May 1930 – 9 May 2005) was a French hurdler. He competed in the men's 110 metres hurdles at the 1952 Summer Olympics.
