= Ioannis Kambadelis =

Greek hurdler

Personal information
- Nationality: Greek
- Born: 7 November 1927
- Died: 1989 (aged 61–62)

Sport
- Sport: Track and field
- Event: 110 metres hurdles

Ioannis Kambadelis (7 November 1927 – 1989) was a Greek hurdler. He competed in the men's 110 metres hurdles and the men's 400 metres hurdles at the 1956 Summer Olympics. He also competed in the men's 4 x 100 metres relay and the men's 4 x 400 relay at the 1952 Summer Olympics.
