= Stanko Lorger =

Yugoslav hurdler (1931–2014)

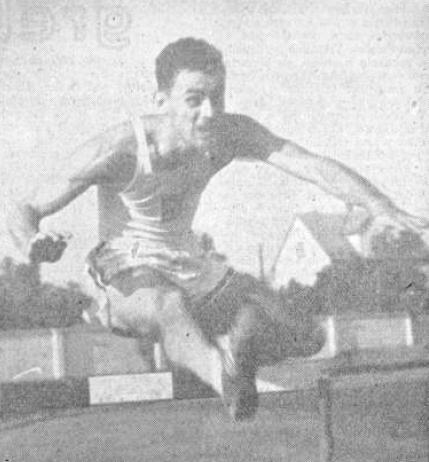

Personal information
- Born: 14 February 1931 Buče, Kozje, Yugoslavia
- Died: 20 April 2014 (aged 83) Ljubljana, Slovenia

Sport
- Sport: Track and field
Medal record
Representing Yugoslavia
European Championships
Silver medal – second place	1958 Stockholm	110 m hurdles
Universiade
Gold medal – first place	1957 Paris	110 m hurdles
Gold medal – first place	1959 Turin	110 m hurdles

Stanko Lorger (14 February 1931 – 25 April 2014) was a Yugoslav hurdler who competed in the 1952 Summer Olympics, in the 1956 Summer Olympics, and in the 1960 Summer Olympics.

== Bibliography ==
-Andreou, Evangelos: "The star of champion shone..." Ed. EUARCE 2011 ("Stanko Lorger" p. 24) Ευάγγελος Ανδρέου, Το αστέρι του πρωταθλητή άναψε... / ο βαλκανιονίκης του μεσοπολέμου Γιάννης Σκιαδάς, EUARCE 2011 ISBN 978-960-99566-0-4 ("Λόργκερ, Στάνκο/Stanko Lorger" σ.24)

Awards
Preceded by Franjo Mihalić	Yugoslav Sportsman of the Year; 1958, 1959	Succeeded by Radivoj Korać
Preceded by Svetozar Gligorić	(Socialist Federal Republic of Yugoslavia) The Best Athlete of Yugoslavia; 1959	Succeeded by Radivoj Korać
