= 1955 Mediterranean Games =

2nd edition of the Mediterranean Games

II Mediterranean Games Barcelona 1955
- Host city: Barcelona, Spain
- Nations: 10
- Athletes: 1,135
- Events: 102 in 19 sports
- Opening: 15 July 1955
- Closing: 25 July 1955
- Opened by: Francisco Franco
- Main venue: Estadi Olímpic de Montjuïc

The 1955 Mediterranean Games, officially known as the II Mediterranean Games, and commonly known as Barcelona 1955, were the 2nd Mediterranean Games. The Games were held in Barcelona, Spain over 10 days, from 15 to 25 July 1955, where 1,135 athletes (all men) from 10 countries participated. There were a total of 102 medal events from 19 different sports. In the medals table France was first on the podium, Italy second and Spain came third.

This second edition were held in the Olympic Stadium and Palace of Sport of Barcelona. The stadium was built in 1929 and was especially renovated for the occasion. The symbol of an amphora filled with Mediterranean Sea water was then used for the first time.

== Participating nations ==
The following is a list of nations that participated in the 1955 Mediterranean Games:

- Egypt (169)
- France (278)
- Greece (73)
- Italy (195)
- Lebanon (34)
- Malta (4)
- Monaco (14)
- Spain (287)
- Syria (41)
- Turkey (40)

== Venues ==
- Estadi Olímpic de Montjuïc: athletics, opening and closing ceremonies
- Palau dels Esports de Barcelona
- Piscina Municipal de Montjuïc: Swimming, Diving, Water Polo

== Sports ==
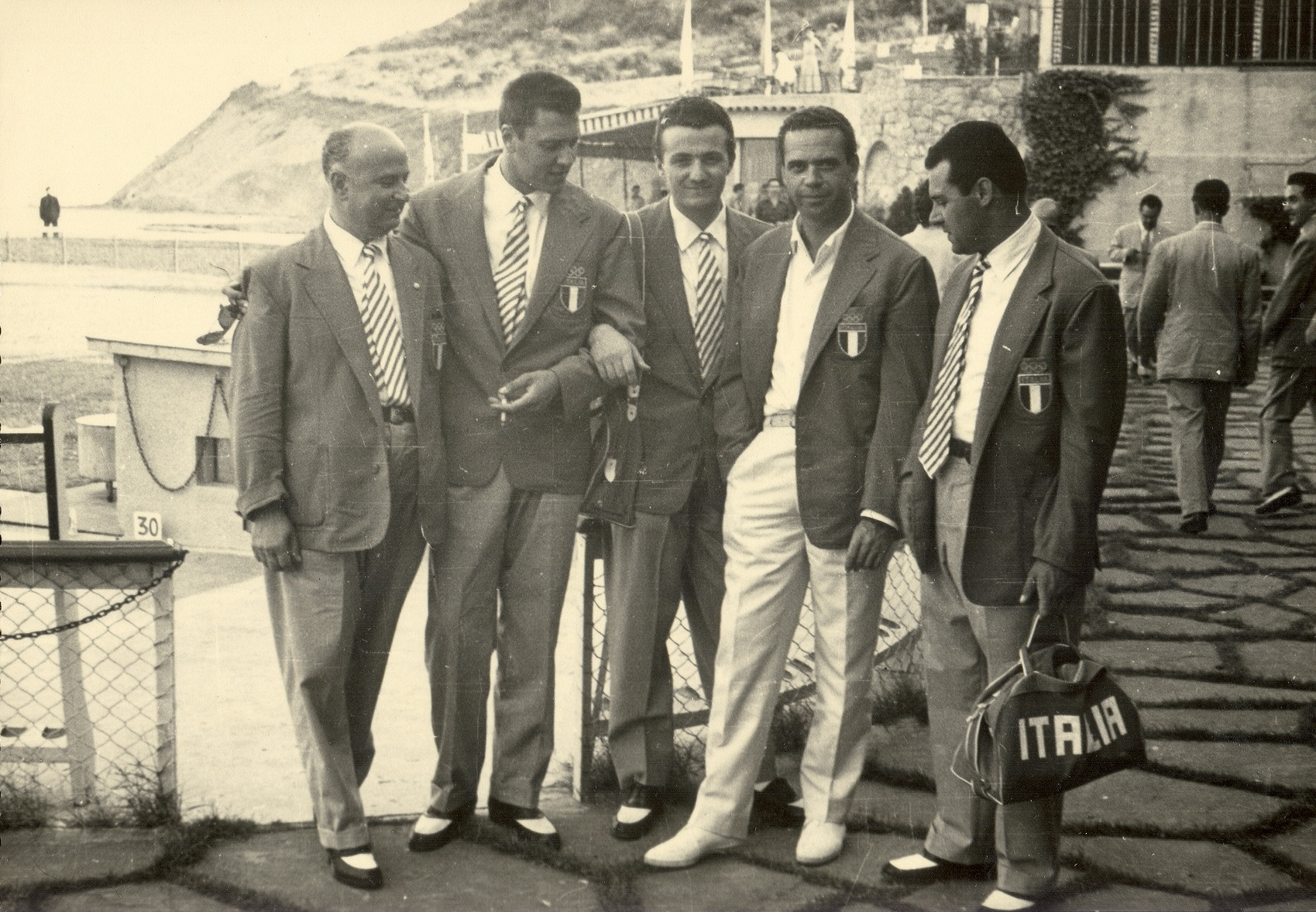
Italian skeet shooting team at the 1955 Mediterranean Games.

The second Mediterranean Games sports program featured 19 sports encompassing 102 men-only events. The number in parentheses next to the sport is the number of medal events per sport.

- Athletics (24)
- Basketball (1)
- Boxing (10)
- Cycling (2)
- Diving (2)
- Equestrian (2)
- Fencing (6)
- Field hockey (1)
- Football (1)
- Gymnastics (8)
- Roller hockey (1)
- Rowing (7)
- Rugby union (1)
- Sailing (3)
- Shooting (9)
- Swimming (8)
- Water polo (1)
- Weightlifting (7)
- Wrestling (8)

== Medal table ==
The rankings sort by the number of gold medals earned by a country. The number of silvers is taken into consideration next and then the number of bronze. Equal ranking is given and they are listed alphabetically if after the above, countries are still tied. This follows the system used by the IOC, and IAAF.

* Host nation (Spain)

Rank	Nation	Gold	Silver	Bronze	Total
1	France	39	29	31	99
2	Italy	32	27	22	81
3	Spain*	12	15	18	45
4	Egypt	9	20	17	46
5	Turkey	8	3	3	14
6	Greece	1	7	8	16
7	Lebanon	1	1	4	6
8	Syria	0	0	1	1
Totals (8 entries)		102	102	104	308
