= Athletics at the 1956 Summer Olympics – Men's 10,000 metres =

Men's 10,000 metres at the Games of the XVI Olympiad
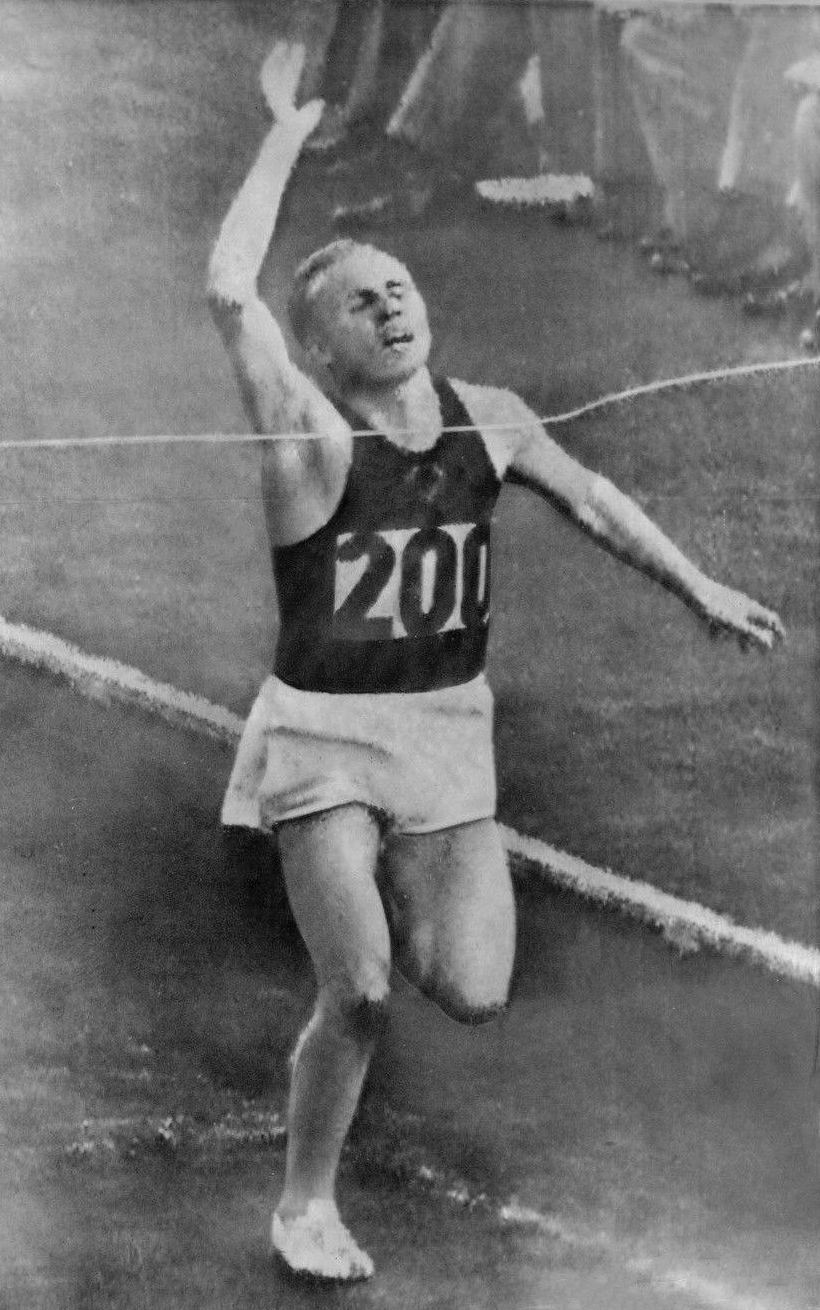
- Kuts winning the 10,000 m event
- Dates: November 23, 1956 (final)
- Competitors: 25 from 15 nations
- Winning time: 28:45.6

Medalists
1st place, gold medalist(s)		Vladimir Kuts; Soviet Union
2nd place, silver medalist(s)		József Kovács; Hungary
3rd place, bronze medalist(s)		Allan Lawrence; Australia

The men's 10,000 metres was an event at the 1956 Summer Olympics in Melbourne, Australia, held on Friday November 23, 1956. There were a total number of 25 participants from 15 nations.

From the gun, favorite Vladimir Kuts took the lead. Only Gordon Pirie was able to maintain contact as Kuts pushed the pace. Then at the conclusion of 12 laps, Kuts swung wide to let Pirie go by. Pirie obliged while Kuts took the rear for a little less than 200 meters, then Kuts accelerated back into the lead. In the last mile, Pirie was broken, Kuts pulled away to an ever-increasing lead. The chase group settled the remaining medals with a final sprint as József Kovács beat Allan Lawrence to the line for silver. Pirie struggled home a lap behind.

== Results ==
Rank	Athlete	Time (hand)	Time (automatic)	Notes
1st place, gold medalist(s)	Vladimir Kuts (URS)	28:45.6	28:45.59	
2nd place, silver medalist(s)	József Kovács (HUN)	28:52.4	28:52.36	
3rd place, bronze medalist(s)	Allan Lawrence (AUS)	28:53.6	28:53.59	
4	Zdzislaw Krzyszkowiak (POL)	29:05.0	29:05.41	
5	Ken Norris (GBR)	29:21.6	–	
6	Ivan Cherniavskyi (URS)	29:31.6	–	
7	David Power (AUS)	29:49.2	–	
8	Gordon Pirie (GBR)	29:49.6	–	
9	Herbert Schade (EUA)	30:00.6	–	
10	Frank Sando (GBR)	30:05.0	–	
11	Pavel Kantorek (TCH)	30:06.0	–	
12	Alain Mimoun (FRA)	30:18.0	–	
13	Walter Konrad (EUA)	30:30.0	–	
14	Frans Herman (BEL)	NT	–	
15	Thyge Thøgersen (DEN)	NT	–	
16	Pyotr Bolotnikov (URS)	NT	–	
17	Klaus Porbadnik (EUA)	NT	–	
18	Gordon McKenzie (USA)	30:34.4	–	
19	Rune Ahlund (SWE)	30:57.0	–	
20	Dave Stephens (AUS)	NT	–	
21	Richard Hart (USA)	31:06.8	–	
22	Ilmari Taipale (FIN)	31:10.6	–	
23	Douglas Kyle (CAN)	31:21.0	–	
	Max Truex (USA)	DNF	–	
	Naw Myitung (BIR)	DNF	–	
	Demissie Gamatcho (ETH)	DNS	–	
	Olavi Rinteenpää (FIN)	DNS	–	
	Miklós Szabó (HUN)	DNS	–	
	Ali Baghbanbashi (IRI)	DNS	–	
	Arere Anentia (KEN)	DNS	–	
	Kanuti Sum (KEN)	DNS	–	
	Jerzy Chromik (POL)	DNS	–	
	Jan Barnard (RSA)	DNS	–	
	Mercer Davies (RSA)	DNS	–	
	Emil Zátopek (TCH)	DNS	–	
