= Athletics at the 1952 Summer Olympics – Men's 5000 metres =

Men's 5000 metres at the Games of the XV Olympiad
- Venue: Olympic Stadium
- Dates: July 22, 1952 (heats); July 24, 1952 (final)
- Competitors: 45 from 24 nations
- Winning time: 14:06.6 OR

Medalists
1st place, gold medalist(s)		Emil Zátopek; Czechoslovakia
2nd place, silver medalist(s)		Alain Mimoun; France
3rd place, bronze medalist(s)		Herbert Schade; Germany

Official Video Highlights

The men's 5000 metres event at the 1952 Olympic Games took place July 22 and July 24. The final was won by Emil Zátopek of Czechoslovakia. The winning margin was 0.8 seconds.

== Results ==
=== Heats ===
The first round was on July 22. The fastest five runners from each heat qualified for the final.

Heat 1

Rank	Name	Nationality	Time (hand)	Time (automatic)	Notes
1	Alain Mimoun	France	14:19.0	14:19.15	Q
2	Ilmari Taipale	Finland	14:22.8	14:22.83	Q
3	Gaston Reiff	Belgium	14:23.8	14:23.92	Q
4	Åke Andersson	Sweden	14:25.0	14:25.09	Q
5	Gordon Pirie	Great Britain	14:26.2	14:26.47	Q
6	Nikifor Popov	Soviet Union	14:28.5	14:28.84	
7	Charlie Capozzoli	United States	14:39.0	–	
8	August Sutter	Switzerland	14:45.2	–	
9	Øistein Saksvik	Norway	14:55.4	–	
10	John Landy	Australia	14:56.4	–	
11	Helmuth Perz	Austria	14:57.2	–	
12	Osamu Inoue	Japan	14:59.0	–	
13	Stevan Pavlović	Yugoslavia	14:59.2	–	
14	József Kovács	Hungary	17:09.2	–	
—	Jan Szwargot	Poland	DNS	–	
—	Milan Švajgr	Czechoslovakia	DNS	–	
—	Raúl Inostroza	Chile	DNS	–	

Heat 2

Rank	Name	Nationality	Time (hand)	Time (automatic)	Notes
1	Herbert Schade	Germany	14:15.4	14:15.44	Q
2	Alan Parker	Great Britain	14:18.2	14:18.47	Q
3	Ernő Béres	Hungary	14:19.6	14:19.66	Q
4	Lucien Theys	Belgium	14:22.2	14:21.62	Q
5	Eero Tuomaala	Finland	14:26.8	–	Q
6	Ivan Semyonov	Soviet Union	14:28.0	–	
7	Alojzy Graj	Poland	14:30.0	–	
8	Osman Coşgül	Turkey	14:36.2	–	
9	Bertil Karlsson	Sweden	14:45.8	–	
10	Pierre Page	Switzerland	14:57.0	–	
11	Ali Baghbanbashi	Iran	15:03.0	–	
12	Ben Ahmed Abdelkrim	France	15:10.2	–	
13	Wes Santee	United States	15:10.4	–	
14	Zdravko Ceraj	Yugoslavia	15:17.8	–	
	Rich Ferguson	Canada	DNF	–	
—	José Coll	Spain	DNS	–	
—	Vasilis Mavrapostolos	Greece	DNS	–	
—	Wim Slijkhuis	Netherlands	DNS	–	

Heat 3

Rank	Name	Nationality	Time (hand)	Time (automatic)	Notes
1	Aleksandr Anufriyev	Soviet Union	14:23.6	14:23.83	Q
2	Bertil Albertsson	Sweden	14:26.0	14:25.80	Q
3	Emil Zátopek	Czechoslovakia	14:26.0	14:25.81	Q
4	Les Perry	Australia	14:27.0	14:27.18	Q
5	Christopher Chataway	Great Britain	14:27.8	14:27.35	Q
6	Ib Planck	Denmark	14:31.6	14:31.66	
7	Martin Stokken	Norway	14:39.0	–	
8	Curt Stone	United States	14:42.8	–	
9	Jean Schlegel	France	14:45.6	–	
10	Kurt Rötzer	Austria	14:49.4	–	
11	Väinö Koskela	Finland	14:50.8	–	
12	Velimir Ilić	Yugoslavia	14:51.6	–	
13	Paul Frieden	Luxembourg	15:23.2	–	
14	Kristján Jóhannsson	Iceland	15:23.8	–	
15	Alphonse Vandenrydt	Belgium	15:51.2	–	
	George Hoskins	New Zealand	DNF	–	
—	Antonio Amorós	Spain	DNS	–	

=== Final ===
Rank	Name	Nationality	Time (hand)	Time (automatic)	Notes
1st place, gold medalist(s)	Emil Zátopek	Czechoslovakia	14:06.6	14:06.72	OR
2nd place, silver medalist(s)	Alain Mimoun	France	14:07.4	14:07.58	
3rd place, bronze medalist(s)	Herbert Schade	Germany	14:08.6	14:08.80	
4	Gordon Pirie	Great Britain	14:18.0	14:18.31	
5	Chris Chataway	Great Britain	14:18.0	14:18.38	
6	Les Perry	Australia	14:23.6	14:23.16	
7	Ernő Béres	Hungary	14:24.8	–	
8	Åke Andersson	Sweden	14:26.0	–	
9	Bertil Albertsson	Sweden	14:27.8	–	
10	Aleksandr Anufriyev	Soviet Union	14:31.4	–	
11	Alan Parker	Great Britain	14:37.0	–	
12	Ilmari Taipale	Finland	14:40.0	–	
13	Eero Tuomaala	Finland	14:54.2	–	
14	Lucien Theys	Belgium	14:59.0	–	
	Gaston Reiff	Belgium	DNF	–	

Key: DNF = Did not finish, OR = Olympic record
