= Athletics at the 1956 Summer Olympics – Men's 5000 metres =

Men's 5000 metres at the Games of the XVI Olympiad
- Venue: Melbourne Cricket Ground
- Dates: 26 November 1956 (heats); 28 November 1956 (final)
- Competitors: 23 from 13 nations
- Winning time: 13:39.6 OR

Medalists
| 1st place, gold medalist(s) | | Vladimir Kuts; Soviet Union |
| 2nd place, silver medalist(s) | | Gordon Pirie; Great Britain |
| 3rd place, bronze medalist(s) | | Derek Ibbotson; Great Britain |

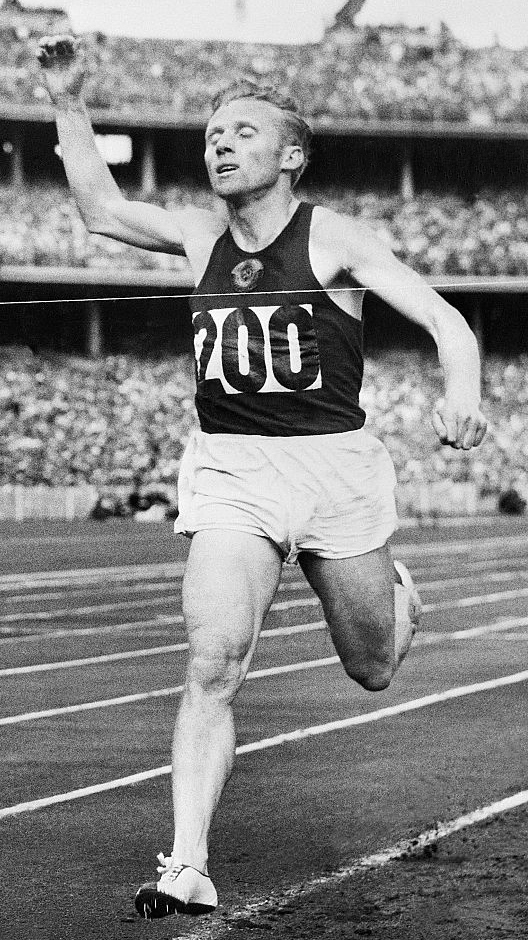
Kuts winning the 5000 m final. His winning margin of 11 seconds was the largest ever for this event in Olympic history.

The men's 5000 metres was an event at the 1956 Summer Olympics in Melbourne, Australia. The final was held on Wednesday November 28, 1956. There were a total number of 23 participants from 13 nations. Christopher Chataway, a world leading 5000 m runner in 1954, suffered from stomach cramps in the final, and finished 11th. The favorite, Vladimir Kuts, led the race from the start. By 4000 m he separated from others and continued pulling away until the finish line.

== Results ==
=== Heats ===
| Rank | Heat | Name | Nationality | Time (hand) | Time (automatic) | Notes |
|---|---|---|---|---|---|---|
| 1 | 3 | Albie Thomas | Australia | 14:14.2 | 14:14.41 | Q |
| 2 | 2 | Allan Lawrence | United States | 14:14.6 | 14:14.67 | Q |
| 3 | 2 | Vladimir Kuts | Soviet Union | 14:15.4 | 14:15.47 | Q |
| 4 | 2 | Laszlo Tabori | Hungary | 14:18.6 | 14:18.75 | Q |
| 5 | 2 | Derek Ibbotson | Great Britain | 14:18.8 | 14:18.78 | Q |
| 6 | 2 | Herbert Schade | United Team of Germany | 14:18.8 | 14:19.25 | Q |
| 7 | 2 | Ilmari Taipale | Finland | 14:24.2 | – | |
| 8 | 1 | Gordon Pirie | Great Britain | 14:25.6 | 14:25.69 | Q |
| 9 | 1 | Veliša Mugoša | Yugoslavia | 14:25.6 | 14:25.71 | Q |
| 10 | 1 | Bill Dellinger | United States | 14:26.8 | 14:26.92 | Q |
| 11 | 1 | Pyotr Bolotnikov | Soviet Union | 14:28.0 | 14:28.17 | Q |
| 12 | 1 | Thyge Thøgersen | Denmark | 14:29.0 | 14:29.34 | Q |
| 13 | 3 | Nyandika Maiyoro | Kenya | 14:29.4 | 14:29.59 | Q |
| 14 | 3 | Ivan Cherniavskyi | Soviet Union | 14:32.4 | 14:32.49 | Q |
| 15 | 3 | Miklós Szabó | Hungary | 14:32.6 | 14:32.83 | Q |
| 16 | 3 | Christopher Chataway | Great Britain | 14:32.6 | 14:32.87 | Q |
| 17 | 1 | Arere Anentia | Kenya | 14:37.0 | 14:37.30 | |
| 18 | 3 | Friedrich Janke | United Team of Germany | 14:40.6 | 14:40.89 | |
| 19 | 3 | Jerzy Chromik | Poland | 14:51.4 | – | |
| 20 | 2 | Curt Stone | United States | 14:52.0 | – | |
| 21 | 2 | Douglas Kyle | Canada | 14:59.0 | – | |
| 22 | 1 | Rune Åhlund | Sweden | 15:12.0 | – | |
| | 1 | Kazimierz Zimny | Poland | DNF | – | |
| | 1 | John Landy | Australia | DNS | – | |
| | 1 | Siegfried Herrmann | United Team of Germany | DNS | – | |
| | 1 | József Kovács | Hungary | DNS | – | |
| | 2 | Ali Baghbanbashi | Iran | DNS | – | |
| | 2 | Ernst Larsen | Norway | DNS | – | |
| | 2 | Zdzisław Krzyszkowiak | Poland | DNS | – | |
| | 3 | Demissie Gamatcho | Ethiopia | DNS | – | |
| | 3 | Alain Mimoun | France | DNS | – | |
| | 3 | Georgios Papavasileiou | Greece | DNS | – | |
| | 3 | Emil Zátopek | Czechoslovakia | DNS | – | |
| | 3 | Max Truex | United States | DNS | – | |

=== Final ===
| Rank | Name | Nationality | Time (hand) | Time (automatic) | Notes |
|---|---|---|---|---|---|
| 1st place, gold medalist(s) | Vladimir Kuts | Soviet Union | 13:39.6 | 13:39.86 | OR |
| 2nd place, silver medalist(s) | Gordon Pirie | Great Britain | 13:50.6 | 13:50.78 | |
| 3rd place, bronze medalist(s) | Derek Ibbotson | Great Britain | 13:54.4 | 13:54.60 | |
| 4 | Miklós Szabó | Hungary | 14:03.4 | 14:03.38 | |
| 5 | Albie Thomas | Australia | 14:04.6 | 14:05.03 | |
| 6 | Laszlo Tabori | Hungary | 14:09.8 | 14:09.99 | |
| 7 | Nyandika Maiyoro | Kenya | 14:19.0 | 14:18.99 | |
| 8 | Thyge Thøgersen | Denmark | 14:21.0 | 14:21.81 | |
| 9 | Pyotr Bolotnikov | Soviet Union | 14:22.4 | 14:22.63 | |
| 10 | Ivan Cherniavskyi | Soviet Union | 14:22.4 | 14:22.67 | |
| 11 | Christopher Chataway | Great Britain | 14:28.8 | 14:28.63 | |
| 12 | Herbert Schade | United Team of Germany | 14:31.8 | 14:31.90 | |
| | Bill Dellinger | United States | DNF | – | |
| | Veliša Mugoša | Yugoslavia | DNF | – | |
| | Allan Lawrence | United States | DNS | – | |
