= 1954 European Athletics Championships – Men's 5000 metres =

Men's 5000 metres at the European Athletics Championships

The men's 5000 metres at the 1954 European Athletics Championships was held in Bern, Switzerland, at Stadion Neufeld on 26 and 29 August 1954.

== Medalists ==
| Gold | Vladimir Kuts; Soviet Union |
| Silver | Christopher Chataway; Great Britain |
| Bronze | Emil Zátopek; Czechoslovakia |

== Results ==
=== Final ===
29 August

| Rank | Name | Nationality | Time | Notes |
|---|---|---|---|---|
| 1st place, gold medalist(s) | Vladimir Kuts | Soviet Union | 13:56.6 | WR |
| 2nd place, silver medalist(s) | Christopher Chataway | Great Britain | 14:08.8 | |
| 3rd place, bronze medalist(s) | Emil Zátopek | Czechoslovakia | 14:10.2 | |
| 4 | Vladimir Okorokov | Soviet Union | 14:20.0 | |
| 5 | Lucien Hanswijck | Belgium | 14:25.6 | |
| 6 | Frans Herman | Belgium | 14:31.4 | |
| 7 | Øistein Saksvik | Norway | 14:32.2 | |
| 8 | Urho Julin | Finland | 14:32.4 | |
| 9 | Sándor Garay | Hungary | 14:44.6 | |
| 10 | Alojzy Graj | Poland | 14:48.6 | |
| 11 | Rolf Haikkola | Finland | 15:22.8 | |
| | Herbert Schade | West Germany | DNF | |
| | Heinz Laufer | West Germany | DNF | |
| | József Kovács | Hungary | DNF | |
| | Fred Green | Great Britain | DNF | |

=== Heats ===
26 August

==== Heat 1 ====
| Rank | Name | Nationality | Time | Notes |
|---|---|---|---|---|
| 1 | Frans Herman | Belgium | 14:42.8 | Q |
| 2 | Fred Green | Great Britain | 14:42.8 | Q |
| 3 | Vladimir Okorokov | Soviet Union | 14:43.0 | Q |
| 4 | Sándor Garay | Hungary | 14:43.6 | Q |
| 5 | Øistein Saksvik | Norway | 14:44.0 | Q |
| 6 | Władysław Płonka | Poland | 14:47.0 | |
| 7 | Osman Coşgül | Turkey | 14:51.0 | |
| 8 | Rudolf Morgenthaler | Switzerland | 14:54.8 | |
| 9 | Dimitar Vachkov | Bulgaria | 14:59.4 | |

==== Heat 2 ====
| Rank | Name | Nationality | Time | Notes |
|---|---|---|---|---|
| 1 | Vladimir Kuts | Soviet Union | 14:18.8 | Q |
| 2 | Herbert Schade | West Germany | 14:23.8 | Q |
| 3 | Lucien Hanswijck | Belgium | 14:29.2 | Q |
| 4 | Urho Julin | Finland | 14:36.2 | Q |
| 5 | Emil Zátopek | Czechoslovakia | 14:36.2 | Q |
| 6 | Pierre Page | Switzerland | 14:37.4 | NR |
| 7 | Karl Lundh | Sweden | 14:42.4 | |
| 8 | Antonio Amorós | Spain | 15:28.6 | |
| | Henri Laethier | France | DNF | |
| | Cahit Önel | Turkey | DNF | |

==== Heat 3 ====
| Rank | Name | Nationality | Time | Notes |
|---|---|---|---|---|
| 1 | Alojzy Graj | Poland | 14:38.4 | Q |
| 2 | József Kovács | Hungary | 14:38.6 | Q |
| 3 | Christopher Chataway | Great Britain | 14:40.0 | Q |
| 4 | Rolf Haikkola | Finland | 14:40.0 | Q |
| 5 | Heinz Laufer | West Germany | 14:42.0 | Q |
| 6 | Kurt Rötzer | Austria | 14:46.2 | |
| 7 | Drago Štritof | Yugoslavia | 14:48.4 | |
| 8 | Manuel Faria | Portugal | 14:55.8 | NR |
| 9 | Helmut Becker | Saar | 15:21.8 | |

== Participation ==
According to an unofficial count, 28 athletes from 19 countries participated in the event.

- Austria (1)
- Belgium (2)
- Bulgaria (1)
- Czechoslovakia (1)
- Finland (2)
- France (1)
- Hungary (2)
- Norway (1)
- Poland (2)
- Portugal (1)
- Saar (1)
- Soviet Union (2)
- Spain (1)
- Sweden (1)
- Switzerland (2)
- Turkey (2)
- Great Britain (2)
- West Germany (2)
- Yugoslavia (1)
