= 1954 European Athletics Championships – Men's 10,000 metres =

Men's 10,000 metres at the European Athletics Championships

The men's 10,000 metres at the 1954 European Athletics Championships was held in Bern, Switzerland, at Stadion Neufeld on 25 August 1954.

== Medalists ==
Gold	Emil Zátopek; Czechoslovakia
Silver	József Kovács; Hungary
Bronze	Frank Sando; Great Britain

== Results ==
=== Final ===
25 August

Rank	Name	Nationality	Time	Notes
1st place, gold medalist(s)	Emil Zátopek	Czechoslovakia	28:58.0	CR
2nd place, silver medalist(s)	József Kovács	Hungary	29:25.8	
3rd place, bronze medalist(s)	Frank Sando	Great Britain	29:27.6	
4	Herbert Schade	West Germany	29:32.8	
5	Franjo Mihalić	Yugoslavia	29:59.6	
6	Peter Driver	Great Britain	30:03.6	
7	Øistein Saksvik	Norway	30:04.4	
8	Aleksandr Anufriyev	Soviet Union	30:19.4	
9	Thomas Nilsson	Sweden	30:22.4	
10	Dimitar Vachkov	Bulgaria	30:25.2	NR
11	Emil Schudel	Switzerland	30:26.4	NR
12	Grigoriy Basalayev	Soviet Union	30:29.4	
13	Stanisław Ożóg	Poland	30:37.2	
14	Hannu Posti	Finland	30:39.4	
15	Thyge Thøgersen	Denmark	30:53.4	
16	Julio Silva	Portugal	30:59.0	NR
17	Rudolf Morgenthaler	Switzerland	31:10.4	
18	Jiří Šantrůček	Czechoslovakia	31:11.2	
19	Lucien Theys	Belgium	31:26.6	
20	Mustafa Özcan	Turkey	31:42.4	
21	Antonio Amorós	Spain	31:50.8	
	Béla Juhász	Hungary	DNF	
	Jan Miecznikowski	Poland	DNF	

== Participation ==
According to an unofficial count, 23 athletes from 17 countries participated in the event.

- Belgium (1)
- Bulgaria (1)
- Czechoslovakia (2)
- Denmark (1)
- Finland (1)
- Hungary (2)
- Norway (1)
- Poland (2)
- Portugal (1)
- Soviet Union (2)
- Spain (1)
- Sweden (1)
- Switzerland (2)
- Turkey (1)
- Great Britain (2)
- West Germany (1)
- Yugoslavia (1)
