= Men's 5000 metres European record progression =

The following table shows the European record progression in the men's 5000 metres running event, as ratified by the EAA.

== Hand timing ==
Time	Athlete	Nationality	Venue	Date
14:36.6	Hannes Kolehmainen	Finland	Stockholm, Sweden	July 10, 1912
14:35.4 (a)	Paavo Nurmi	Finland	Stockholm, Sweden	September 12, 1922
14:28.2	Paavo Nurmi	Finland	Helsinki, Finland	June 19, 1924
14:17.0 (b)	Lauri Lehtinen	Finland	Helsinki, Finland	June 19, 1932
14:08.8	Taisto Mäki	Finland	Helsinki, Finland	June 16, 1939
13:58.2 (c)	Gunder Hägg	Sweden	Gothenburg, Sweden	September 20, 1942
13:57.2	Emil Zátopek	Czechoslovakia	Paris, France	May 30, 1954
13:56.6	Vladimir Kuts	Soviet Union	Bern, Switzerland	August 29, 1954
13:51.6	Christopher Chataway	United Kingdom	London, England	October 13, 1954
13:51.2	Vladimir Kuts	Soviet Union	Prague, Czechoslovakia	October 23, 1954
13:50.8	Sándor Iharos	Hungary	Budapest, Hungary	September 10, 1955
13:46.8	Vladimir Kuts	Soviet Union	Belgrade, Yugoslavia	September 18, 1955
13:40.6	Sándor Iharos	Hungary	Budapest, Hungary	October 23, 1955
13:36.8	Gordon Pirie	United Kingdom	Bergen, Norway	June 19, 1956
13:35.0	Vladimir Kuts	Soviet Union	Rome, Italy	October 13, 1957
13:34.4	Michel Jazy	France	Lorient, France	June 6, 1965
13:29.0	Michel Jazy	France	Paris, France	June 11, 1965
13:27.6	Michel Jazy	France	Helsinki, Finland	June 30, 1965
13:24.8	Harald Norpoth	West Germany	Cologne, West Germany	September 7, 1966
13:22.8	Ian Stewart	United Kingdom	Edinburgh, Scotland	July 25, 1970
13:22.2	David Bedford	United Kingdom	Edinburgh, Scotland	June 12, 1971
13:17.2 (d)	David Bedford	United Kingdom	London, England	July 14, 1972
13:16.4 (e)	Lasse Virén	Finland	Helsinki, Finland	September 14, 1972
13:13.0	Emiel Puttemans	Belgium	Brussels, Belgium	September 20, 1972

(a) Timed at 14:35.3 but rounded for record ratification
(b) Timed at 14:16.9 but rounded for record ratification
(c) Timed at 13:58.1 but rounded for record ratification
(d) Timed at 13:17.21 but rounded for record ratification
(e) Timed at 13:16.3 but rounded for record ratification

== Automatic timing ==
Ratified
Not ratified
Ratified but later rescinded
Pending ratification

Time	Athlete	Nationality	Venue	Date	Ref
13:10.40	Hansjörg Kunze	East Germany	Rieti, Italy	September 9, 1981	
13:00.41	David Moorcroft	United Kingdom	Oslo, Norway	July 7, 1982	
12:54.70	Dieter Baumann	Germany	Zürich, Switzerland	August 13, 1997	
12:49.71	Mohammed Mourhit	Belgium	Brussels, Belgium	August 26, 2000	
12:48.45	Jakob Ingebrigtsen	Norway	Florence, Italy	June 10, 2021	
12:45.01	Mohamed Katir	Spain	Fontvieille, Monaco	July 21, 2023	
12:44.27	Andreas Almgren	Sweden	Stockholm, Sweden	June 15, 2025	
