= Athletics at the 1958 British Empire and Commonwealth Games – Men's 3 miles =

Men's 3 miles at the 1958 British Empire and Commonwealth Games
- Venue: Cardiff Arms Park
- Date: 22 July 1958
- Winning time: 13:14.96

Medalists
gold medal	Murray Halberg	New Zealand
silver medal	Albie Thomas	Australia
bronze medal	Neville Scott	New Zealand

The men's 3 miles event at the 1958 British Empire and Commonwealth Games was held on 22 July at the Cardiff Arms Park in Cardiff, Wales.

== Results ==
Rank	Name	Nationality	Time	Notes
1st place, gold medalist(s)	Murray Halberg	New Zealand	13:14.96	
2nd place, silver medalist(s)	Albie Thomas	Australia	13:24.37	
3rd place, bronze medalist(s)	Neville Scott	New Zealand	13:26.06	
4	Gordon Pirie	England	13:29.6	
5	Peter Clark	England	13:30.6	
6	John Merriman	Wales	13:32.2	
7	Dave Power	Australia	13:37.37	
8	Arere Anentia	Kenya	13:39.5	
9	Bill Baillie	New Zealand	13:42.2	
10	Derek Ibbotson	England	13:44.4	
11	Michael Bullivant	England	13:45.7	
12	Nyandika Maiyoro	Kenya	??:??.?	
13	David Richards	Wales	??:??.?	
14	Ian Binnie	Scotland	??:??.?	
15	Arthur Magee	New Zealand	??:??.?	
16	Joe Connolly	Scotland	??:??.?	
17	Billy McCue	Northern Ireland	??:??.?	
18	Arap Kanuti	Kenya	??:??.?	
19	George De Peana	British Guiana	??:??.?	
20	Mubarak Shah	Pakistan	??:??.?	
21	Abdul Wahab Mohamed Salleh	Sarawak	??:??.?	
	Chepsiror Chepkwony	Kenya	DNF	
	John Disley	Wales	DNF	
	Ralph Gomes	British Guiana	DNS	
	Alastair Wood	Scotland	DNS	
