= Athletics at the 1954 British Empire and Commonwealth Games – Men's 3 miles =

Men's 3 miles at the 1954 British Empire and Commonwealth Games
- Venue: Empire Stadium
- Date: 4 August 1954
- Winning time: 13:35.2

Medalists
gold medal	Chris Chataway	England
silver medal	Fred Green	England
bronze medal	Frank Sando	England

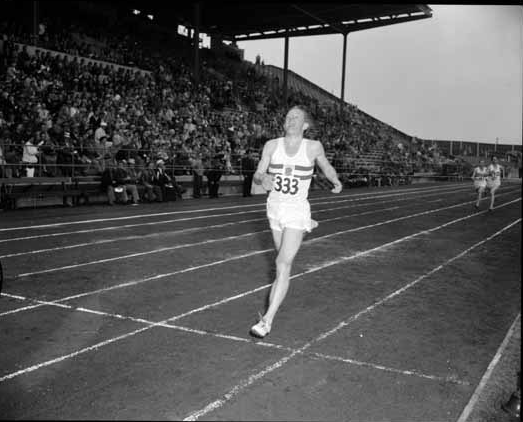
Chris Chataway wins the 3 miles race in a new games record. Attribution:Province newspaper

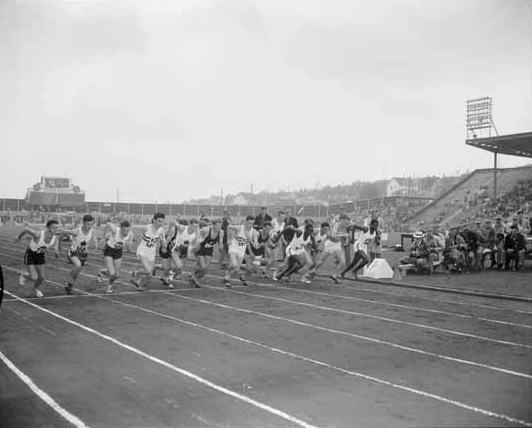
The start of the race. Attribution:Province newspaper

The men's 3 miles event at the 1954 British Empire and Commonwealth Games was held on 4 August at the Empire Stadium in Vancouver, Canada.

== Results ==
Rank	Name	Nationality	Time	Notes
1st place, gold medalist(s)	Chris Chataway	England	13:35.2	GR
2nd place, silver medalist(s)	Fred Green	England	13:37.2	
3rd place, bronze medalist(s)	Frank Sando	England	13:37.4	
4	Nyandika Maiyoro	Kenya	13:43.8	
5	Peter Driver	England	13:47.0	
6	Edwin Warren	Australia	13:50.0	
7	Ian Binnie	Scotland	13:59.6	
8	Lawrence King	New Zealand	14:03.4	
9	Ernest Haskell	New Zealand	14:07.0	
10	Al Lawrence	Australia	14:16.0	
11	Henry Kennedy	Canada	14:20.0	
12	Lazaro Chepkwony	Kenya	14:27.0	
13	Selwyn Jones	Canada	14:33.0	
14	James Daly	New Zealand	14:41.0	
	Lyle Garbe	Canada	DNF	
	Doug Kyle	Canada	DNF	
	John Landy	Australia	DNS	
	Neil Robbins	Australia	DNS	
	Murray Halberg	New Zealand	DNS	
	John Disley	Wales	DNS	
