= Athletics at the 1954 British Empire and Commonwealth Games – Men's 6 miles =

Men's 6 miles at the Commonwealth Games
- Venue: Empire Stadium
- Dates: 31 July

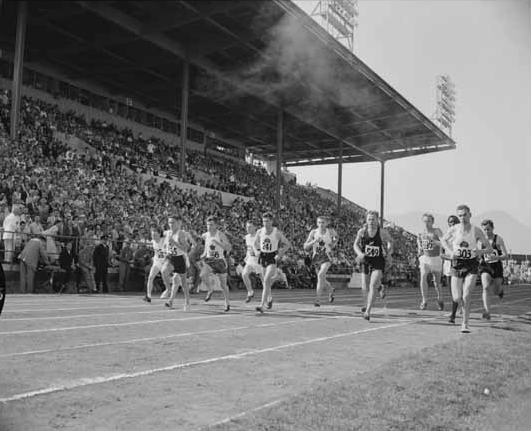
The start of the 6 mile race. Attribution:Province newspaper

The men's 6 miles event at the 1954 British Empire and Commonwealth Games was held on 31 July at the Empire Stadium in Vancouver, Canada.

Peter Driver led a clean sweep of the medals for England.

== Results ==
Rank	Name	Nationality	Time	Notes
1st place, gold medalist(s)	Peter Driver	England	29:09.4	GR
2nd place, silver medalist(s)	Frank Sando	England	29:10.0	
3rd place, bronze medalist(s)	Jim Peters	England	29:20.0	
4	Edwin Warren	Australia	29:42.6	
5	Stan Cox	England	30:11.4	
6	Ian Binnie	Scotland	30:15.2	
7	Lazaro Chepkwony	Kenya	30:16.2	
8	Al Lawrence	Australia	30:18.8	
9	Lawrence King	New Zealand	31:01.9	
10	Selwyn Jones	Canada	31:05.0	
11	Ernest Haskell	New Zealand	31:41.0	
	Neil Robbins	Australia	DNF	
	Doug Kyle	Canada	DNF	
	Lyle Garbe	Canada	DNS	
