= Alf Ramsøy =

Norwegian footballer

Alf Ramsøy (13 September 1925 – 27 May 2014) was a Norwegian long-distance runner, cross-country skier, actor and farmer.

He was born in Todalen, Surnadal as a son of farmers Jon Ramsøy and Ingrid Ramsøy, née Halle. As an active runner, his personal best times were 8:37.8 minutes in the 3000 metres (1955), 14:51.2 minutes in the 5000 metres (1958) and 30:46.8 minutes in the 10,000 metres (1958). In cross-country running, 8 kilometre course, he won silver medals at the Norwegian Championships in 1956 behind Øistein Saksvik and in 1957 behind Tor Torgersen. He represented the club IL i BUL. He won a bronze medal in the 3 kilometre course in 1954. He won Holmenkollstafetten and the Norwegian championship in 4 x 1500 metres relay with BUL. He was also a cross-country skier with an 18th place in 50 kilometres at the Holmenkollen ski festival in 1953.

His stage debut as an actor came in 1950, in the play "Læraren" at Det Norske Teatret. He starred in the films Dei svarte hestane (1951) and Nine Lives (1957), and worked at Det Norske Teatret for eight years. In 1958 he withdrew to run his family's sheep farm in Todalen.

After contracting polio in the 1960s, he became reliant on a wheelchair. He died in May 2014.

== Filmography ==
Year	Title	Role	Notes
1951	Dei svarte hestane	Leiv Førnes	
1957	Nine Lives	Ivar, kjelketrekker	(final film role)
