= 5000 metres world record progression =

The official world records in the 5000 metres, or 5000-metre run, are held by Joshua Cheptegei with 12:35.36 for men and Beatrice Chebet with 13:58.06 for women.

The first world record in the men's 5000 m was recognized by World Athletics (formerly called the International Association of Athletics Federations, or IAAF) in 1912. As of January 2024, 36 world records have been ratified by World Athletics in the event.

The first world record in the women's 5000 m was recognized by the IAAF in 1981. As of January 2024, 16 world records have been ratified by the IAAF in the event.

== Men ==
=== Pre-World Athletics ===
Time	Athlete	Date	Location
16:34.6	George Touquet-Daunis (FRA)	1897-10-31	Paris, France
16:29.2	George Touquet-Daunis (FRA)	1899-05-22	Lyon, France
15:29.8	Charles Bennett (GBR)	1900-07-22	Paris, France
14:59.0	Alfred Shrubb (GBR)	1904-06-13	Glasgow, United Kingdom

=== World Athletics era ===
Ratified
Not ratified
Ratified but later rescinded
Pending ratification

Time	Athlete	Date	Location
14:36.6	Hannes Kolehmainen (FIN)	1912-07-10	Stockholm, Sweden
14:35.4	Paavo Nurmi (FIN)	1922-09-12	Stockholm, Sweden
14:28.2	Paavo Nurmi (FIN)	1924-06-19	Helsinki, Finland
14:17.0	Lauri Lehtinen (FIN)	1932-06-19	Helsinki, Finland
14:08.8	Taisto Mäki (FIN)	1939-06-16	Helsinki, Finland
13:58.2	Gunder Hägg (SWE)	1942-09-20	Gothenburg, Sweden
13:57.2	Emil Zátopek (TCH)	1954-05-30	Paris, France
13:56.6	Vladimir Kuts (URS)	1954-08-29	Bern, Switzerland
13:51.6	Chris Chataway (GBR)	1954-10-13	London, United Kingdom
13:51.2	Vladimir Kuts (URS)	1954-10-23	Prague, Czechoslovakia
13:50.8	Sandor Iharos (HUN)	1955-09-10	Budapest, Hungary
13:46.8	Vladimir Kuts (URS)	1955-09-18	Belgrade, Yugoslavia
13:40.6	Sandor Iharos (HUN)	1955-10-23	Budapest, Hungary
13:36.8	Gordon Pirie (GBR)	1956-06-19	Bergen, Norway
13:35.0	Vladimir Kuts (URS)	1957-10-13	Rome, Italy
13:34.8	Ron Clarke (AUS)	1965-01-16	Hobart, Australia
13:33.6	Ron Clarke (AUS)	1965-02-01	Auckland, New Zealand
13:25.8	Ron Clarke (AUS)	1965-06-04	Compton, USA
13:24.2	Kipchoge Keino (KEN)	1965-11-30	Auckland, New Zealand
13:16.6	Ron Clarke (AUS)	1966-07-05	Stockholm, Sweden
13:16.4	Lasse Virén (FIN)	1972-09-14	Helsinki, Finland
13:13.0	Emiel Puttemans (BEL)	1972-09-20	Brussels, Belgium
13:12.9	Dick Quax (NZL)	1977-07-05	Stockholm, Sweden
13:08.4	Henry Rono (KEN)	1978-04-08	Berkeley, California, USA
13:06.20	Henry Rono (KEN)	1981-09-13	Knarvik, Norway
13:00.41	David Moorcroft (GBR)	1982-07-07	Oslo, Norway
13:00.40	Saïd Aouita (MAR)	1985-07-27	Oslo, Norway
12:58.39	Saïd Aouita (MAR)	1987-07-27	Rome, Italy
12:56.96	Haile Gebrselassie (ETH)	1994-06-04	Hengelo, Netherlands
12:55.30	Moses Kiptanui (KEN)	1995-06-08	Rome, Italy
12:44.39	Haile Gebrselassie (ETH)	1995-08-16	Zürich, Switzerland
12:41.86	Haile Gebrselassie (ETH)	1997-08-13	Zürich, Switzerland
12:39.74	Daniel Komen (KEN)	1997-08-22	Brussels, Belgium
12:39.36	Haile Gebrselassie (ETH)	1998-06-13	Helsinki, Finland
12:37.35	Kenenisa Bekele (ETH)	2004-05-31	Hengelo, Netherlands
12:35.36	Joshua Cheptegei (UGA)	2020-08-14	Monaco

Auto times to the hundredth of a second were accepted by the IAAF for events up to and including 10,000m from 1981. Dick Quax's 13:12.9 from 1977 was recorded as 13:12.87 to the hundredth of a second.

== Women ==
=== Pre-recognition ===
Time	Athlete	Date	Location
16:17.4	Paola Pigni (ITA)	1969-05-11	Formia, Italy
15:53.6	Paola Pigni (ITA)	1969-09-02	Milan, Italy
15:41.4	Natalia Mărășescu (ROM)	1977-03-16	Oradea, Romania
15:37.0	Janice Merrill (USA)	1977-07-11	Mainz, Germany
15:35.52	Kathy Mills (USA)	1978-05-26	Knoxville, United States
15:08.8	Loa Olafsson (DEN)	1978-05-30	Sollerod, Denmark
15:33.8	Janice Merrill (USA)	1979-05-19	Durham, United States
15:30.6	Janice Merrill (USA)	1980-03-22	Stanford, United States
15:28.43	Ingrid Kristiansen (NOR)	1981-07-11	Oslo, Norway
15:24.6	Yelena Sipatova (URS)	1981-09-06	Podolsk, Soviet Union

Note: Loa Olfsson's mark was achieved in a mixed race with men.

=== World Athletics world records ===
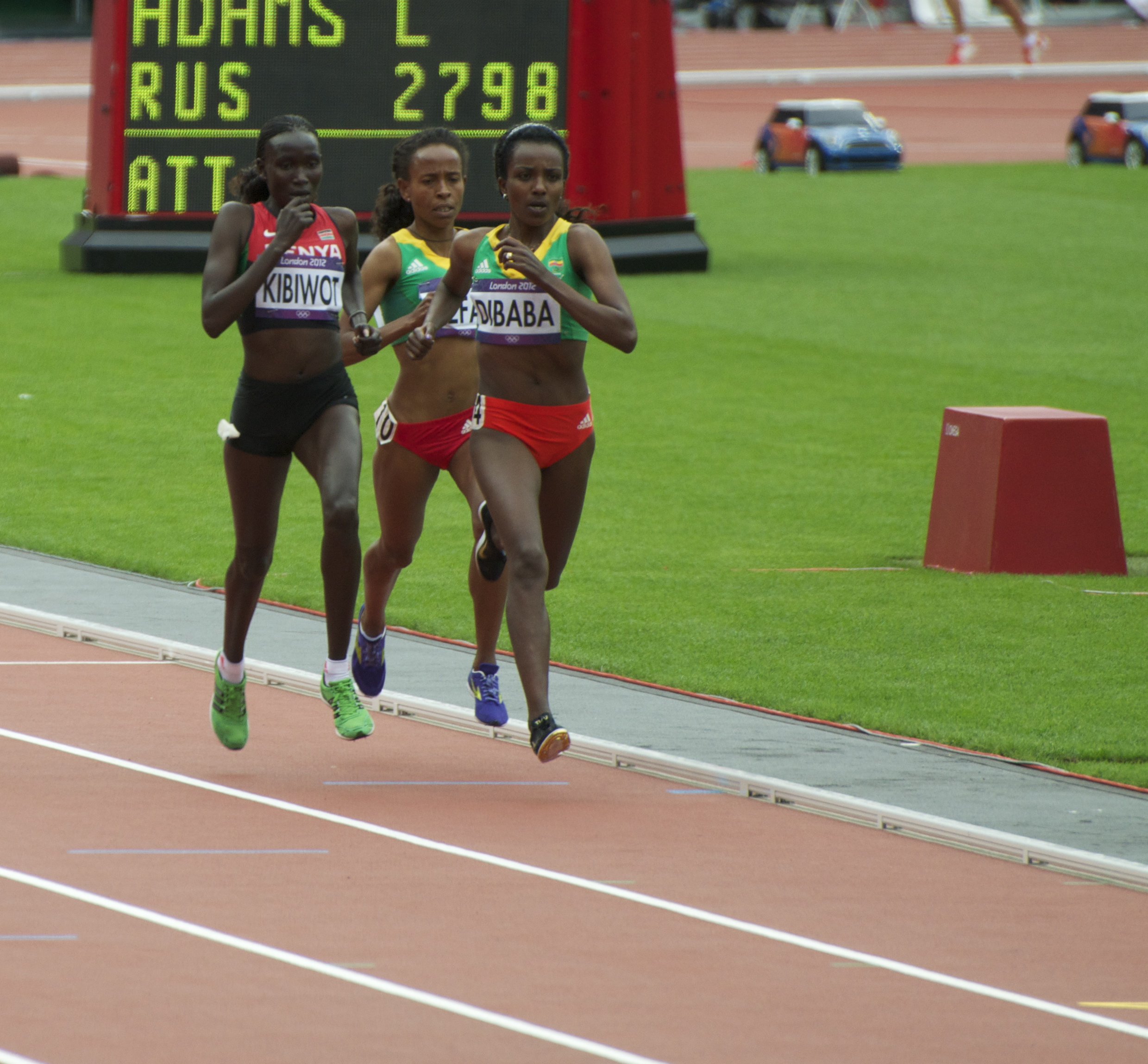
Former women's world record holder Tirunesh Dibaba (right) leading another former world record holder Meseret Defar (centre) at the 2012 Olympic 5000 m final

Time	Athlete	Date	Location
15:14.51	Paula Fudge (GBR)	1981-09-13	Knarvik, Norway
15:13.22	Anne Audain (NZL)	1982-03-17	Auckland, New Zealand
15:08.26	Mary Tabb (USA)	1982-06-05	Eugene, Oregon, United States
15:01.83 (Note: Time was rejected as South Africa was suspended from IAAF membership.)	Zola Budd (RSA)	1984-01-05	Stellenbosch, South Africa
14:58.89	Ingrid Kristiansen (NOR)	1984-06-28	Oslo, Norway
14:48.07	Zola Budd (GBR)	1985-08-26	London, United Kingdom
14:37.33	Ingrid Kristiansen (NOR)	1986-08-05	Stockholm, Sweden
14:36.45	Fernanda Ribeiro (POR)	1995-07-22	Hechtel, Belgium
14:31.27	Dong Yanmei (CHN)	1997-10-21	Shanghai, China
14:28.09	Jiang Bo (CHN)	1997-10-23	Shanghai, China
14:24.68	Elvan Abeylegesse (TUR)	2004-06-11	Bergen, Norway
14:24.53	Meseret Defar (ETH)	2006-06-03	New York, United States
14:16.63	Meseret Defar (ETH)	2007-06-15	Oslo, Norway
14:11.15	Tirunesh Dibaba (ETH)	2008-06-06	Oslo, Norway
14:06.62	Letesenbet Gidey (ETH)	2020-10-07	Valencia, Spain
14:05.20	Faith Kipyegon (KEN)	2023-06-09	Paris, France
14:00.21	Gudaf Tsegay (ETH)	2023-09-17	Eugene, Oregon
13:58.06	Beatrice Chebet (KEN)	2025-07-05	Eugene, Oregon
