= Alan Parker (athlete) =

British long-distance runner

Personal information
- Nationality: British (English)
- Born: 5 May 1928 Barrow-in-Furness, England
- Died: 15 November 2012 (aged 84) Woking, England
- Height: 183 cm (6 ft 0 in)
- Weight: 70 kg (154 lb)

Sport
- Sport: Athletics
- Event: middle-distance
- Club: Barrow Athletic Club

Alan Bunyard Parker (5 May 1928 – 15 November 2012) was a British long-distance runner who competed in the 1952 Summer Olympics.

== Biography ==
Parker was born in Barrow-in-Furness and was educated at Barrow Grammar School and the University of Liverpool.

A member of the Barrow Athletic Club, he won a 2-mile open handicap event during World War II in 1944. Two years later he won the Northern Counties Junior Mile Championship before taking up cross country. In 1947 he won the University Athletic Union mile race for Lancashire but failed to make the Great Britain team for the 1948 Olympic Games in London.

Parker finished third behind Bill Nankeville in the 1 mile event at the 1950 AAA Championships.

Parker found himself running in an era when Bill Nankeville, Roger Bannister, Chris Chataway and Gordon Pirie were all representing Great Britain, which limited Parker's success but after securing a second place finish behind Chris Chataway in the 3 miles at the 1952 AAA Championships, he gained selection for the Great Britain team at the 1952 Olympic Games in Helsinki.

As a civil Servant, Parker later won several titles at the Civil Service Championships.
