= Åke Andersson =

Åke Andersson may refer to:

- Åke Andersson (footballer, born 1917) (1917–1983), Swedish footballer
- Åke Andersson (footballer, born 1906) (1906–1982), Swedish footballer
- Åke Andersson (footballer, born 2007), Swedish footballer
- Åke Andersson (ice hockey) (1918–1982), Swedish ice hockey player
- Åke Andersson (athlete) (1925–2005), Swedish long-distance runner
- Åke Andersson (orienteering) (born 1921), Swedish orienteerer and sports leader
- Åke Andersson (rally driver), Swedish rally driver
- Åke Andersson (speedway rider) (born 1936), Swedish speedway international
