= Velimir Ilić (athlete) =

Yugoslav long-distance runner

Personal information
- Nationality: Yugoslav
- Born: 25 October 1925 Žirovnica, Yugoslavia
- Died: 17 June 2007 (aged 81) Belgrade, Serbia

Sport
- Sport: Long-distance running
- Event: 5000 metres

Velimir Ilić (25 October 1925 – 17 June 2007) was a Yugoslav long-distance runner. He competed in the men's 5000 metres at the 1952 Summer Olympics.
