= August Sutter =

Swiss long-distance runner

Personal information
- Nationality: Swiss
- Born: 28 November 1926
- Died: 21 March 2011 (aged 84)

Sport
- Sport: Long-distance running
- Event: 5000 metres

August Sutter (28 November 1926 – 21 March 2011) was a Swiss long-distance runner. He competed in the men's 5000 metres at the 1952 Summer Olympics.
