= Tor Torgersen =

Norwegian distance runner (1928–2020)

Personal information
- Born: 20 March 1928 Drammen, Norway
- Died: 23 October 2020 (aged 92)

Sport
- Sport: Track and Field
- Event: Running

Tor Torgersen (20 March 1928 – 23 October 2020) was a Norwegian long-distance runner. He specialized in the longest track distances, 5000 and 10,000 metres, as well as cross-country running and from around 1960 the marathon, in which he also competed at that year's Olympic Games. On the track he became national champion in two events in 1959, with an additional four titles taken outside the track. He was later a national team coach in swimming.

== Career ==
Torgersen was born in Drammen. During his career, he represented the clubs IF Torodd, Sarpsborg IL and IK Tjalve. His personal best times were 8:11.0 in the 3000 metres (1959), 14:13.8 in the 5000 metres (1959), the former Norwegian record 29:30.8 in the 10,000 metres (1959) and 2:27:30 hours in the marathon (1960). In middle distance races he had 3:56.6 in the 1500 metres (1958) and 4:19.8 in the mile run (1955).

Internationally he placed eleventh in the 10,000 metres at the 1958 European Championships and 26th in the marathon at the 1960 Summer Olympics in Rome. On the track he became Norwegian champion in the 5000 metres in 1959 ahead of Reidar Andreassen and Pål Benum. He also won silver medals in 1956, 1958 and 1960 and a bronze in 1955. In 1959 he also won the national 10,000 metres title. He broke a Trondheim dominance of more than decade, with Martin Stokken, Øistein Saksvik and Ernst Larsen having won all titles but one since 1947. In this event, Torgersen also won a national silver medal in 1957.

Torgersen also overcame Saksvik's Norwegian record in the 10,000 metres, set in 1955, when he in July 1959 at Bislett stadion ran the distance in 29:30.8 minutes. The record stood until 1964, when it was beaten by Thor Helland. Aged 31 years and 3 months when he set the record, Torgersen is still the oldest ever 10,000 metre record setter in Norway. Torgersen with IK Tjalve sat a new Norwegian club record in the 4 × 1500 metres relay in 1958, but it was broken by IL i BUL's team three months later. Torgersen also broke the Norwegian record in the one-hour run in 1960, but this was an intermediate time in a longer distance race, and since Torgersen did not finish that race the intermediate time was not sanctioned as a record.

On the road, Torgersen became national marathon champion in the Olympic season 1960; his only medal in the event. He won one title in the cross-country forest course, in 1957, and took bronze medals in 1956 and 1958. In 1957 and 1959 he won the 8 kilometre cross-country championship, with a silver in 1960, and in the 3 kilometre cross-country championship he took bronze medals in 1958, 1959 and 1960. He also won the road relay Holmenkollstafetten with IK Tjalve.

Torgersen was a teacher and coach in Larvik, and has been credited with discovering the talent of middle-distance runner Lars Martin Kaupang. He was also a Norwegian national team coach in swimming until 1981, when he was hired in the Danish swimming club AGF Aarhus. Here he coached Olympic medallist Susanne Nielsson.
