= Veliša Mugoša =

Yugoslav long-distance runner

Personal information
- Nationality: Yugoslav
- Born: 14 April 1931 Lješkopolje, Donja Gorica, Podgorica, Yugoslavia
- Died: 14 April 1978 (aged 47)

Sport
- Sport: Long-distance running
- Event: 5000 metres

Achievements and titles
- Highest world ranking: 8th in men's 5000m (1956)
- Personal bests: 800m: 1:50.4 1500m: 3:43.0; 3000m: 8:05.4 5000m: 13:58.8
Medal record
Men's athletics
Representing Yugoslavia
World University Games
Silver medal – second place	1957 Paris	5000 m
Balkan Athletics Championships
Gold medal – first place	1955 Istanbul	1500 m
Gold medal – first place	1956 Belgrade	1500 m
Gold medal – first place	1956 Belgrade	5000 m
Gold medal – first place	1957 Athens	5000 m

Veliša Mugoša (Serbian Cyrillic: Велиша Мугоша; 14 April 1931 – 14 April 1979) was a Yugoslav long-distance runner from Montenegro. He competed in the men's 5000 metres at the 1956 Summer Olympics. He finished in second place in the men's 5000 meters at the 1957 World University Games.

== Running career ==
Mugoša ran as a youth in the place of his birth, Lješkopolje, a rural part of the Donja Gorica suburb in present-day Podgorica. In 1949, Mugoša was the winner of a state junior 1500 meter race for high schoolers in Varaždin. After graduating from high school, he trained in several track clubs over a shorter period of time, including Budućnost, Olimpija Ljubljana, Mladost Zagreb, and AK Partizan. After that, he moved to AK Crvena Zvezda, where he trained until the end of his career. In Belgrade, he was a geography and philosophy student at the University of Belgrade while he recorded Yugoslavia's leading results in the 1500, 3000, and 5000 meters. On 1 July 1956, he ran a personal best time of 13:58.8 in a 5000-meter race in Belgrade, becoming the first person from Yugoslavia to ever run the distance under 14 minutes. At the 1956 Summer Olympics, he progressed to the men's 5000 meter final but dropped out of the race after going out at world record pace.

In the late 1950s, he traveled to the United States where he ran several indoor races. On 1 February 1958, in front of an audience of 12,445 at Boston Garden, Mugoša finished the indoor 2-mile at the Boston AA Games in second place behind Deacon Jones, who won in 9:01.1. On 22 February 1958, he won the men's indoor 3-mile at the AAU Indoor Championships in a time of 13:54.2.
