= Rolf Haikkola =

Finnish long-distance runner (1927–2024)

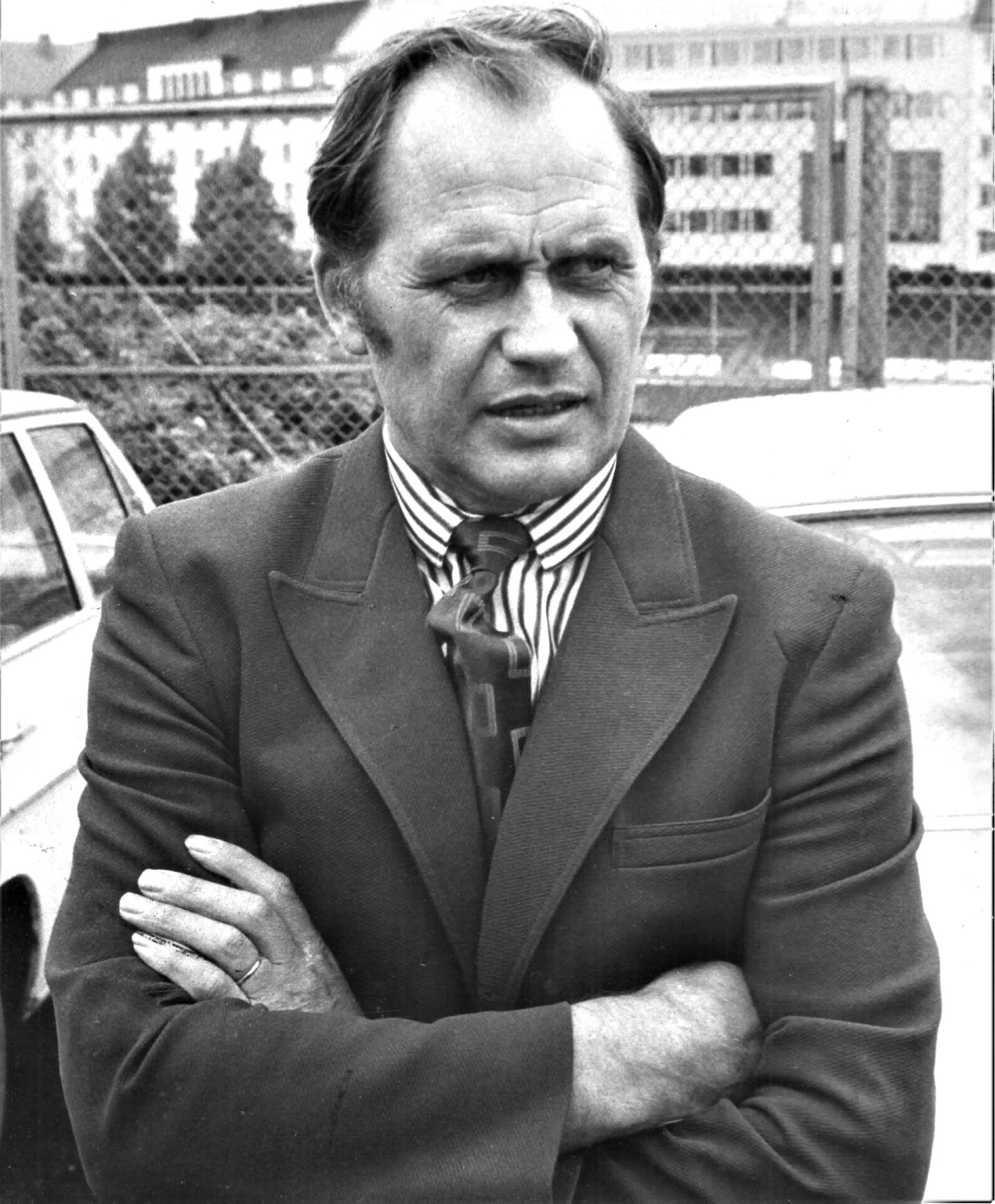

Personal information
- Nationality: Finnish
- Born: 14 July 1927 Myrskylä, Finland
- Died: 15 March 2024 (aged 96)

Sport
- Sport: Long-distance running
- Event(s): 5000 metres, 10,000 metres

Rolf Haikkola (14 July 1927 – 15 March 2024) was a Finnish long-distance runner and athletics coach. He competed at men's 5000 meters in the 1954 European Athletics Championships finishing 11th. Haikkola was best known as the coach of the four-time Olympic gold medal winner Lasse Virén. Haikkola died on 15 March 2024, at the age of 96.
