= Kristján Jóhannsson (athlete) =

Icelandic long-distance runner (1929–2013)

Personal information
- Full name: Kristján Tryggvi Jóhannsson
- Nationality: Icelandic
- Born: 10 December 1929 Reykjavík, Iceland
- Died: 24 January 2013 (aged 83) Reykjavík, Iceland

Sport
- Sport: Long-distance running
- Event: 5000 metres

Kristján Jóhannsson (10 December 1929 – 24 January 2013) was an Icelandic long-distance runner. He competed in the men's 5000 metres at the 1952 Summer Olympics.
