= Jean Schlegel =

French long-distance runner (1925–2020)

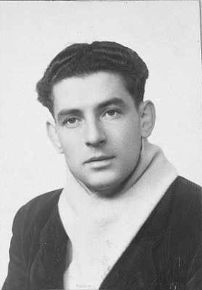
- Jean pictured in 7 December 1945 in Rio de Janeiro Immigration port for a temporary stay as a sportsman.

Personal information
- Full name: Jean Joseph Schlegel
- Nationality: French
- Born: 24 October 1925 Rennes, France
- Died: 18 February 2020 (aged 94) Rennes, France

Sport
- Sport: Long-distance running
- Event: 5000 metres

Jean Joseph Schlegel (24 October 1925 – 18 February 2020) was a French long-distance runner. He competed in the men's 5000 metres at the 1952 Summer Olympics.
