= Lancelot Joynson-Hicks, 3rd Viscount Brentford =

British peer and Conservative politician

The Right Honourable The Viscount Brentford
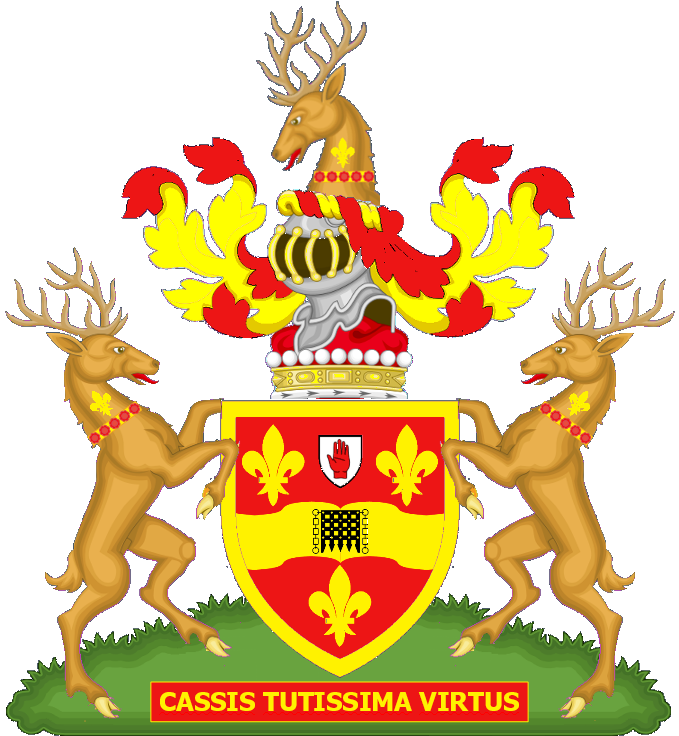

Member of Parliament for Chichester
- In office 25 May 1942 – 27 June 1958
- Preceded by: John Courtauld
- Succeeded by: Walter Loveys

Personal details
- Born: Lancelot William Joynson-Hicks; 10 April 1902 London, England
- Died: 25 February 1983 (aged 80) East Sussex, England
- Party: Conservative
- Spouse: Phyllis Allfey (m. 1931; died 1979)
- Children: Crispin
- Education: Sandroyd School; Winchester College; Trinity College, Oxford

Military service
- Allegiance: United Kingdom
- Branch/service: Royal Naval Reserve
- Rank: Lieutenant-commander
- Battles/wars: Second World War

Lancelot William Joynson-Hicks, 3rd Viscount Brentford (10 April 1902 – 25 February 1983), known as Sir Lancelot William Joynson-Hicks, Bt from 1942 to 1958, was a British Conservative politician and solicitor. He was the Member of Parliament for Chichester from 1942 to 1958, when he became 3rd Viscount and was elevated to the House of Lords.

== Background and education ==
Joynson-Hicks was born in Marylebone, London, the second son of former Home Secretary William Joynson-Hicks, 1st Viscount Brentford and Grace Lynn Joynson. He was educated at Sandroyd School then Winchester College and Trinity College, Oxford.

== Political career ==
Joynson-Hicks later became a solicitor and a farmer. He served in the Second World War as a lieutenant-commander in the Royal Navy Volunteer Reserve. He sat as Member of Parliament (MP) for Chichester from 1942 to 1958 and served under Winston Churchill as Parliamentary Secretary to the Ministry of Fuel and Power from 1951 to 1955. In 1956 he was created a Baronet, of Newick in the County of Sussex. On the death of his older brother, Richard Joynson-Hicks, 2nd Viscount Brentford, in 1958, he succeeded as Viscount Brentford. As a peer he was disqualified from sitting in the House of Commons, and a by-election was triggered.

Lord Brentford was also Chairman of the Automobile Association and served as a member of the House of Laity in the National Assembly of the Church of England. He continued to work as a solicitor in his later years, though his work came under scrutiny in the 1970s, when he and Reginald Maudling were associated with the failure of the Real Estate Fund of America.

== Family ==
Lord Brentford married Phyllis Allfey (d. 1979), daughter of Herbert Cyril Allfey, in 1931. He died in the Lewes District of East Sussex on 20 February 1983, aged 80, and was succeeded in his titles by his only child Crispin.

== Arms ==
Coat of arms of Lancelot Joynson-Hicks, 3rd Viscount Brentford

Crest
A stag’s head Proper gorged with a collar Or thereon five roses Gules and charged in the neck with a fleur-de-lis Gold.
Escutcheon
Gules on a fess wavy between three fleurs-de-lis Or a portcullis Sable all within a bordure of the second.
Supporters
On either side a stag Proper gorged with a collar Or thereon five roses Gules and charged on the neck with a fleur-de-lis Gold.
Motto
Cassis Tutissima Virtus

Parliament of the United Kingdom
Preceded by John Sewell Courtauld	Member of Parliament for Chichester; 1942 – 1958	Succeeded by Walter Loveys
Political offices
Preceded by Harold Neal	Parliamentary Secretary to the Ministry of Fuel and Power; 1951–1955	Succeeded by David Renton
Baronetage of the United Kingdom
New creation	Baronet (of Newick); 1956–1983	Succeeded by Crispin William Joynson-Hicks
Peerage of the United Kingdom
Preceded by Richard Joynson-Hicks	Viscount Brentford; 1958–1983	Succeeded by Crispin William Joynson-Hicks
