= South London Harriers =

British athletics club

- Founded: 1871
- Location: 194 Brighton Road, Coulsdon, London CR5 2NF, England
- Coordinates: 51°19′11″N 0°08′22″W
- Website: official website

South London Harriers (SLH) is a British athletics club based in Coulsdon, South London, England. The club's headquarters are based at 194 Brighton Road but training and racing primarily takes place at the athletics track at Woodcote High School and on Farthing Downs. The club train on Tuesday and Thursday evenings but also run sessions at weekends that include events such as cross-country and triathlon.

== History ==
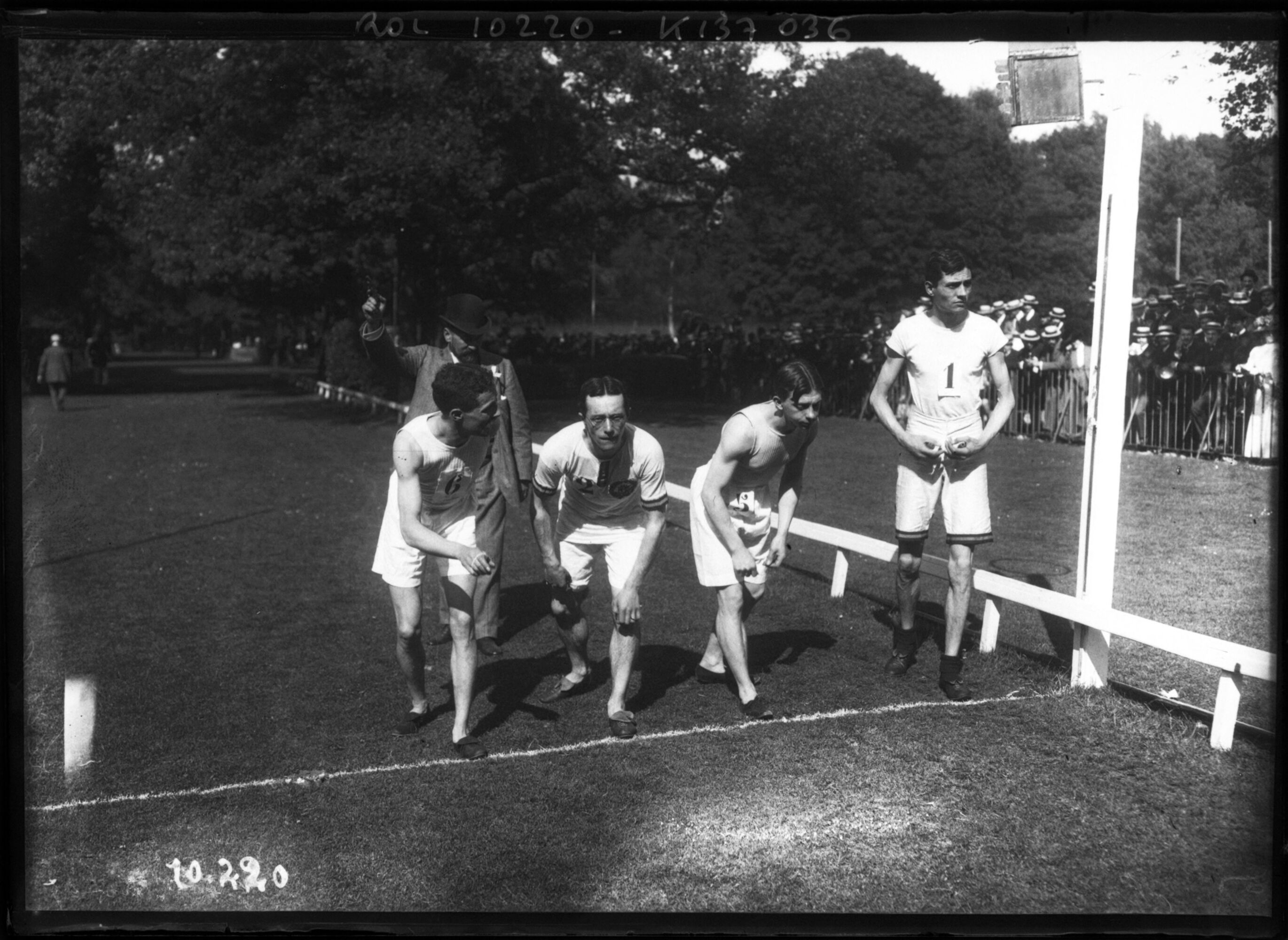
Racing Club de France versus South London Harriers, 31 May 1909, the start of the 1500 metres at Croix Catelan

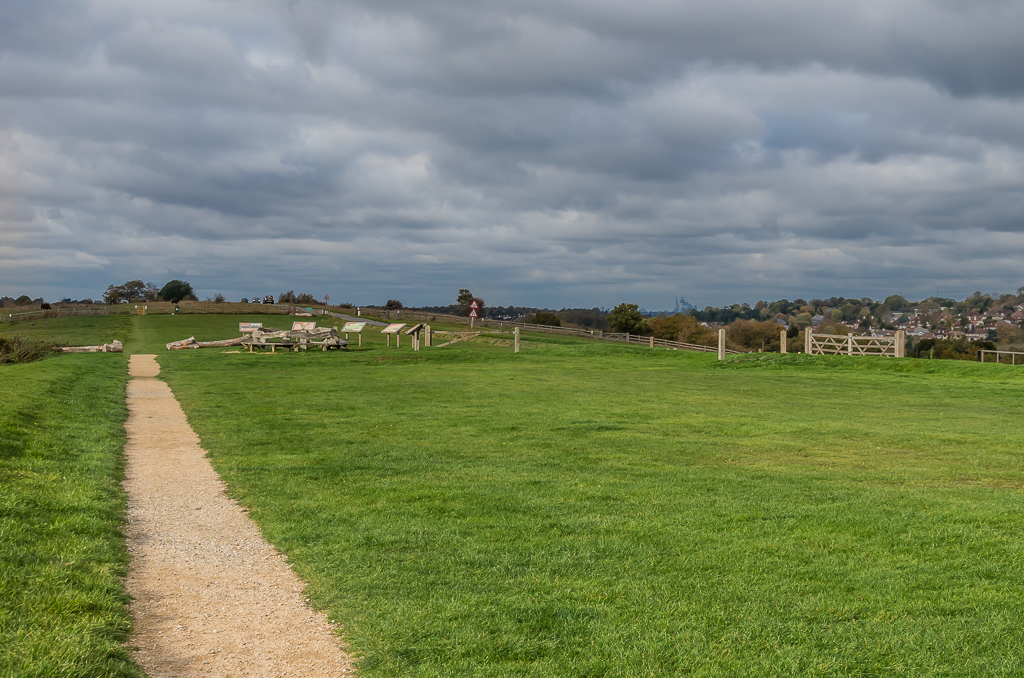
Farthing Downs

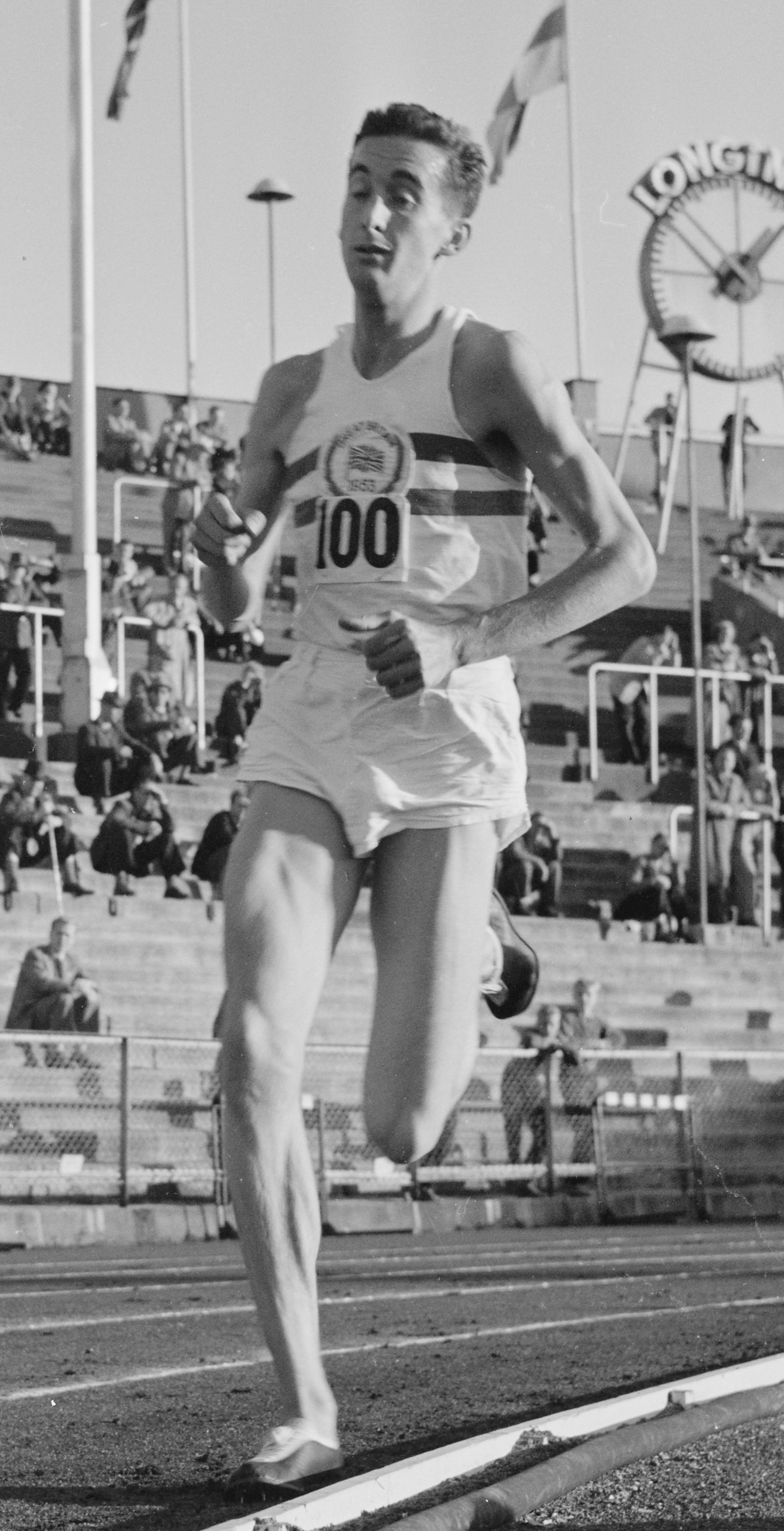
Gordon Pirie

The club was founded on 27 December 1871 at a meeting in the Vivian Arms in Peckham Rye, with the first cross country race taking place on 13 January 1872 and the first track meeting held on 24 August 1872.

The club experienced significant success at the English National Cross Country Championships with Herbert A Heath being the club's first winner of the event in 1891 and 1892. Alfred Shrubb later won the event for four consecutive years from 1901 to 1904.

The club supplied seven Olympians for the 1908 Summer Olympics in London and later produced two silver medal winners at the Olympics with Tom Richards in 1948 and Gordon Pirie in 1956.

SLH has used 45 different venues for staging track and field meeting throughout its history but in 1991, the club moved from the Tooting Bec Athletics Track to the Crystal Palace National Sports Centre, which it still uses for specialised training. SLH moved to the athletics track at Woodcote High School following its construction in 2013.

== Honours ==
- English National Cross Country Championships team winners: 1955, 1957, 1958
- English National Cross Country Championships individual winners: 1892, 1893, 1901, 1902, 1903, 1904, 1953, 1954, 1955

== Notable athletes ==
=== Olympians ===
Athlete	Events	Games	Medals/Ref
Jack Densham	400m hurdles	1908	
Alfred Flaxman	SHJ, GD, discus, javelin	1908	
Jack George	100m, 200m	1908	
Francis Knott	1500m	1908	
(Republic of Ireland) Larry Manogue	800m	1908	
Edwin Montague	400m, 1600m medley	1908	
Jack Morton	100m, 200m, 1600m medley	1908	
Leslie Housden	marathon	1920	
Sonny Spencer	1500m	1924	
Brian Oddie	5000m	1928	
Harold Moody	shot put	1948	
Derek Pugh	400m, 4 × 400 m relay	1948	
(Wales) Tom Richards	marathon	1948	Silver medal
Jack Parker	110m hurdles	1952, 1956	
Gordon Pirie	5,000m, 10,000m	1952, 1956, 1960	Silver medal
Gordon Miller	high jump	1960, 1964	
Laurie Reed	1500m	1960	

- English unless stated
- GD=Greek discus, SHJ=standing high jump

=== Commonwealth Games ===
Athlete	Events	Games	Medals/Ref
Peter Driver	6 miles	1956	Gold medal
Harry Hedges	1 mile	1930	
