= Ib Planck =

Danish long-distance runner

Personal information
- Nationality: Danish
- Born: 2 January 1930
- Died: 9 April 2014 (aged 84)

Sport
- Sport: Long-distance running
- Event: 5000 metres

Ib Planck (2 January 1930 – 9 April 2014) was a Danish long-distance runner. He competed in the men's 5000 metres at the 1952 Summer Olympics.
