= Viscount Brentford =

Viscountcy in the Peerage of the United Kingdom

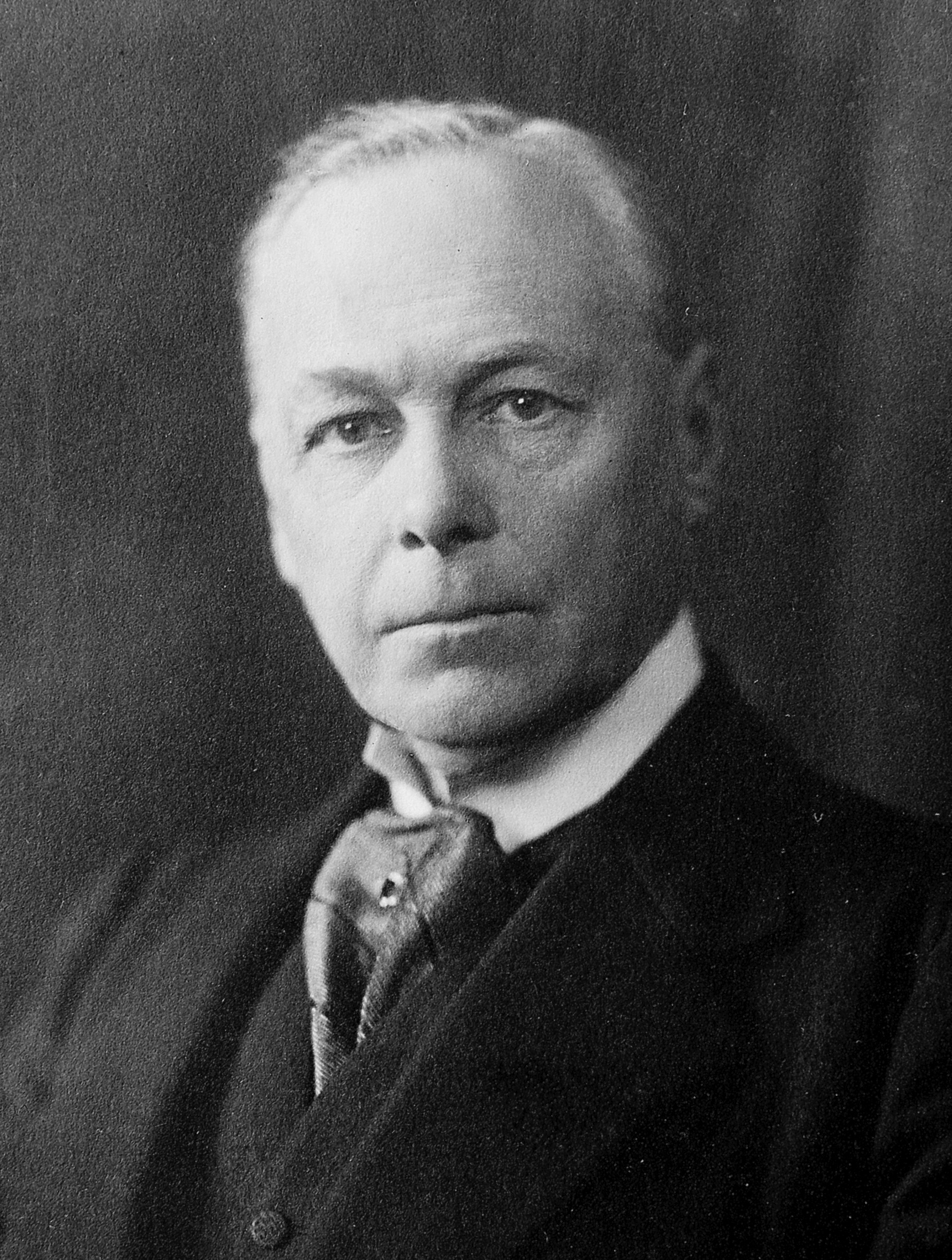
William Joynson-Hicks, 1st Viscount Brentford

Viscount Brentford, of Newick in the County of Sussex, is a title in the Peerage of the United Kingdom. It was created in 1929 for the Conservative politician Sir William Joynson-Hicks, 1st Baronet, chiefly remembered for his tenure as Home Secretary from 1924 to 1929. He had already been created a baronet, of Holmsbury, in the Baronetage of the United Kingdom, on 20 September 1919. His younger son, the third Viscount, was also a Conservative politician. On 29 January 1956, two years before he succeeded his elder brother in the viscountcy, he was created a baronet, of Newick. As of 2022 the titles are held by the third Viscount's son, the fourth Viscount, who succeeded in 1983. He is a retired solicitor and has served as the president of the Church Society.

The family seat is Cousley Place, near Wadhurst, East Sussex.

== Viscounts Brentford (1929) ==
- William Joynson-Hicks, 1st Viscount Brentford (1865–1932)
- Richard Cecil Joynson-Hicks, 2nd Viscount Brentford (1896–1958)
- Lancelot William Joynson-Hicks, 3rd Viscount Brentford (1902–1983)
- Crispin William Joynson-Hicks, 4th Viscount Brentford (b. 1933)

The heir apparent is the present holder's only son, Paul William Joynson-Hicks (b. 1971)
The heir apparent’s heir apparent is his eldest son, Tom William Joynson-Hicks (b. 2009)

== Arms ==
Coat of arms of Viscount Brentford
Crest A stag’s head Proper gorged with a collar Or thereon five roses Gules and charged in the neck with a fleur-de-lis Gold. Escutcheon Gules on a fess wavy between three fleurs-de-lis Or a portcullis Sable all within a bordure of the second. Supporters On either side a stag Proper gorged with a collar Or thereon five roses Gules and charged on the neck with a fleur-de-lis Gold. Motto Cassis Tutissima Virtus
