= Walter Loveys =

British politician (1920–1969)

Walter Loveys MP

Member of Parliament for Chichester
- In office 6 November 1958 – 7 March 1969
- Preceded by: Lancelot Joynson-Hicks
- Succeeded by: Christopher Chataway

Personal details
- Born: 2 November 1920 Westhampnett, England
- Died: 7 March 1969 (aged 48) Flansham, England
- Party: Conservative
- Education: Lancing College
- Profession: Farmer

Walter Harris Loveys (2 November 1920 – 7 March 1969), sometimes known as Bill Loveys, was a British farmer and Conservative Party politician.

Loveys was born in Westhampnett. He was educated at Lancing College but had no interest in a further academic career, as he had a job waiting for him on the 500-acre (2.0 km^{2}) family farm. He built up a herd of pedigree Aberdeen Angus cattle.

Loveys married Muriel Helen Prior in 1944, and they had three children.

In 1953, Loveys was made Chairman of Chichester Conservative Association, and elected to West Sussex County Council. On the council he chaired the Agricultural Education Committee. When Lancelot Joynson-Hicks, MP for Chichester, inherited a peerage in 1958, Loveys was selected from 71 applicants to fight the byelection to replace him. The selection was somewhat controversial and some members of the Conservative Association were reported to be looking for an independent candidate to support instead, but such a candidate could not be found and Loveys duly won the seat.

In Parliament Loveys was not a prominent member. He was Honorary Secretary of the House of Commons Motor Club, and also had his farming experience acknowledged in the horticulture sub-committee of the Conservative private members' committee on Agriculture, Fisheries and Food. He had already announced his retirement due to health concerns when he died at his home in Flansham on 7 March 1969, aged 48.

Parliament of the United Kingdom
Preceded by Lancelot Joynson-Hicks	Member of Parliament for Chichester; 1958–1969	Succeeded by Christopher Chataway
