= Alojzy Graj =

Polish long-distance runner

Personal information
- Nationality: Polish
- Born: 12 December 1929 Trzeboń, Poland
- Died: 16 June 1983 (aged 53) Bydgoszcz, Poland
- Height: 1.82 m (6 ft 0 in)
- Weight: 65 kg (143 lb)

Sport
- Sport: Long-distance running
- Event: 5000 metres
- Club: Gwardia Lublin (1950); Gwardia Warsaw (1951–1952); OWKS Bydgoszcz (1953–1956); AKS Zawiercie (1957); Zawisza Bydgoszcz (1958–1959)

Alojzy Graj (12 December 1929 – 16 June 1983) was a Polish long-distance runner. He competed in the men's 5000 metres at the 1952 Summer Olympics.

== International competitions ==
Year	Competition	Venue	Position	Event	Notes
Representing Poland
1952	Olympic Games	Helsinki, Finland	18th (h)	5000 m	14:30.0
1953	World Festival of Youth and Students	Bucharest, Romania	7th	5000 m	14:41.6
1954	World Student Games	Budapest, Hungary	3rd	1500 m	3:50.8
1954	World Student Games	Budapest, Hungary	1st	5000 m	14:44.8
1954	European Championships	Bern, Switzerland	10th	5000 m	14:48.6
1955	World Festival of Youth and Students	Warsaw, Poland	10th	5000 m	14:43.0

== Personal bests ==
- 800 metres – 1:53.0h (Wałcz 1959)
- 1000 metres – 2:27.7h (Sopot 1959)
- 1500 metres – 3:50.4h (Warsaw 1954)
- 3000 metres – 8:13.8h (Warsaw 1956)
- 5000 metres – 14:16.8h (Warsaw 1954)
- 10,000 metres – 31:29.4h (Bydgoszcz 1957)
- 3000 metres steeplechase – 8:57.8h (Brno 1955)
