= Larry Manogue =

British athlete (1875–1925)

Personal information
- Nationality: Irish
- Born: 14 June 1875 Callan, Kilkenny
- Died: 7 September 1925 (aged 50) Barry, Wales

Sport
- Sport: Athletics
- Event: middle-distance
- Club: South London Harriers

Lawrence Joseph Manogue (14 June 1875 – 7 September 1925) was an Irish born athlete who competed for Great Britain at the 1908 Summer Olympics.

== Biography ==
Manogue was born in Callan, County Kilkenny, Ireland and educated at St. Kieran’s College, Kilkenny City. He moved to London to work in the civil service and joined the South London Harriers.

Manogue won the 8 miles Irish Championship in February 1908. Manogue represented Great Britain at the 1908 Summer Olympics in London. In the 800 metres, Manogue did not finish his semifinal heat, dropping out around the halfway mark and not advancing to the final.

He died in Barry, Vale of Glamorgan, Wales.

== Sources ==
- Cook, Theodore Andrea (1908). The Fourth Olympiad, Being the Official Report. London: British Olympic Association.
- De Wael, Herman (2001). "Athletics 1908". Herman's Full Olympians. Archived from the original on 27 September 2006.
- Wudarski, Pawel (1999). "Wyniki Igrzysk Olimpijskich" (in Polish).
- L. J. Manogue at World Athletics
- L. J. Manogue at Olympedia
