= 1969 Chichester by-election =

UK Parliamentary by-election

The 1969 Chichester by-election of 22 May 1969 was held following the death of Conservative Member of Parliament (MP) Walter Loveys. The seat was retained for the Conservatives by Christopher Chataway, who had previously been MP for Lewisham North from 1959 to 1966.

== Results ==
Chichester by-Election 1969
| Party | Candidate | Votes | % | ±% |
|---|---|---|---|---|
| Conservative | Christopher Chataway | 31,966 | 74.16 | +17.00 |
| Liberal | Denys Kinsella | 5,879 | 13.64 | −4.07 |
| Labour | John White | 5,257 | 12.20 | −12.93 |
| Majority | | 26,087 | 60.52 | +28.49 |
| Turnout | | 43,102 | | |
| Conservative hold | | Swing | | |

General election 1966: Chichester
| Party | Candidate | Votes | % | ±% |
|---|---|---|---|---|
| Conservative | Walter Loveys | 31,358 | 57.16 | |
| Labour | DJ Burnett | 13,784 | 25.13 | |
| Liberal | PJ Collins | 9,714 | 17.71 | |
| Majority | | 17,574 | 32.03 | |
| Turnout | | 54,856 | 73.19 | |
| Conservative hold | | Swing | +3.15 | |
