= Laurie Reed =

British athlete (1936–2018)

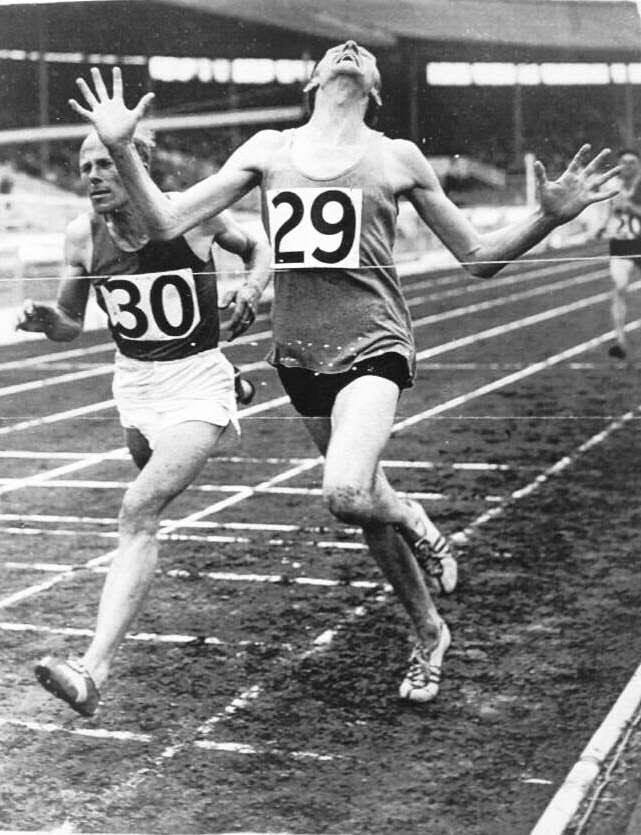

Personal information
- Nationality: British (English)
- Born: 22 May 1936 Dulwich, England
- Died: 21 May 2018 (aged 81) Oxted, England
- Height: 187 cm (6 ft 2 in)
- Weight: 67 kg (148 lb)

Sport
- Sport: Middle-distance running
- Event: 1500 metres
- Club: South London Harriers

Laurence David George Reed (22 May 1936 – 21 May 2018) was a British middle-distance runner who competed at the 1960 Summer Olympics.

== Biography ==
Reed finished third behind Frank Salvat in the 3 miles event at the 1960 AAA Championships.

At the 1960 Olympic Games in Rome, he represented Great Britain in the men's 1500 metres.
