= Ben Ahmed Abdelkrim =

French long-distance runner

Personal information
- Nationality: French
- Born: 1 June 1932 (age 94)

Sport
- Sport: Long-distance running
- Event: 5000 metres

Ben Ahmed Abdelkrim (born 1 June 1932) is a French long-distance runner. He competed in the men's 5000 metres at the 1952 Summer Olympics.
