= 1958 Chichester by-election =

UK Parliamentary by-election

The 1958 Chichester by-election was held on 6 November 1958 when the incumbent Conservative MP Lancelot Joynson-Hicks succeeded to a peerage. It was won by the Conservative candidate, Walter Loveys.

By Election 6 November 1958: Chichester
Party	Candidate	Votes	%	±%
Conservative	Walter Loveys	23,158	70.90	+0.11
Labour	W Edgar Simpkins	9,504	29.10	−0.11
Majority		13,654	41.80	+0.23
Turnout		32,662		
Conservative hold		Swing		
