= Paul Frieden =

Luxembourgish long-distance runner

Personal information
- Nationality: Luxembourgish
- Born: 25 May 1925
- Died: 25 July 2012 (aged 87)

Sport
- Sport: Long-distance running
- Event: 5000 metres

Paul Frieden (25 May 1925 – 25 July 2012) was a Luxembourgish long-distance runner. He competed in the men's 5000 metres at the 1952 Summer Olympics.
