= Billy McCue =

Northern Irish athlete

Personal information
- Nationality: British (Northern Irish)
- Born: c.1935

Sport
- Sport: Athletics
- Event: middle-distance
- Club: Lisnagarvey Harriers; Royal Ulster Constabulary AC

Billy McCue (born c.1935) is a former athlete from Northern Ireland, who represented Northern Ireland at the British Empire and Commonwealth Games (now Commonwealth Games).

== Biography ==
McCue began running for Lisnagarvey Harriers and was a constable with the Royal Ulster Constabulary and was also a member of their athletics club.

He represented Ireland at international level and in May 1958, won the 3 miles at the first trials at Paisley Park, with the view to going to the Empire Games. He also won the 3 miles title at the 1958 Summer Athletic League trophy meeting.

McCue was named by the Northern Ireland AAA in the final 1958 Northern Irish Team for the forthcoming Empire and Commonwealth Games. He subsequently competed at the 1958 British Empire and Commonwealth Games in Cardiff, Wales, participating in the one athletics event; the 3 miles.
