= David Richards (athlete) =

Welsh athlete

Personal information
- Nationality: British (Welsh)
- Born: c.1935 Wales

Sport
- Sport: Athletics
- Event: Middle-distance / Long-distance / Cross country
- Club: Polytechnic Harriers

David James Phillip Richards (born c.1935) is a former track and field athlete from Wales, who competed at the 1958 British Empire and Commonwealth Games (now Commonwealth Games).

== Biography ==
Richards was a member of the Polytechnic Harriers and in May 1957 won the Universities championship at Palmer Park.

He was a Welsh international by 1957 and represented the 1958 Welsh team at the 1958 British Empire and Commonwealth Games in Cardiff, Wales, where he participated in one event; the three miles race.

He was the 1959 Welsh cross-country champion.
