= Lars Martin Kaupang =

Norwegian middle-distance runner

Lars Martin Kaupang (born 18 August 1952) is a Norwegian middle-distance runner. He specialized in the 1500 metres, in which he held the Norwegian record from 1976 to 2012.

He hailed from Larvik and was discovered in school by teacher, coach and former runner Tor Torgersen. He represented the club Larvik TIF; for some time the short-lived cooperation club Larvik FIK.

Internationally he participated at the 1974 European Championships and the 1976 Summer Olympics without reaching the final. He had a rather short career pinnacle, only winning three Norwegian championship medals; the gold in the 1500 metres in 1974, 1975 and 1976. His personal best times were 1:49.8 minutes in the 800 metres (1976), 3:37.4 in the 1500 metres (1976) and 3:59.9 in the mile run (1974). His 1500 metres time was a Norwegian record until 2012, when it was broken by Henrik Ingebrigtsen. In long-distance races he had 8:01.0 in the 3000 metres (1975) and 13:56.0 in the 5000 metres (1975).

He was a board member of the Norwegian Athletics Association from 1985 to 1987 and chaired the organization from 1987 to 1997. He was also a member of the Norwegian Olympic Committee from 1990 to 1994.

Sporting positions
Preceded by Trygve Tamburstuen	President of the Norwegian Athletics Association; 1987–1997	Succeeded by Anne Thidemann
