= Rune Åhlund =

Swedish long-distance runner (1930–2019)

Personal information
- Full name: Gustav Rune Åhlund
- Nationality: Swedish
- Born: 31 August 1930 Vingåker, Södermanland, Sweden
- Died: 8 February 2019 (aged 88) Strängnäs, Södermanland, Sweden

Sport
- Sport: Long-distance running
- Event: 5000 metres

Gustav Rune Åhlund (31 August 1930 – 8 February 2019) was a Swedish long-distance runner. He competed in the men's 5000 metres at the 1956 Summer Olympics.
