= Eero Tuomaala =

Finnish long-distance runner

Eero Tuomaala (12 October 1926 – 2 June 1988) was a Finnish long-distance runner who competed in the Men's 5000 meters at the 1952 Summer Olympics.
