= Ernő Béres =

Hungarian runner (1928–2023)

Personal information
- Born: 30 July 1928
- Died: 21 April 2023 (aged 94)

Sport
- Country: Hungary
- Sport: long-distance running

Ernő Béres (30 July 1928 – 21 April 2023) was a Hungarian long-distance runner who competed in the 1952 Summer Olympics.

Béres was born in Miskolc on 30 July 1928, and died on 21 April 2023, at the age of 94.
