= Sándor Iharos =

Hungarian long-distance runner

Personal information
- Born: 10 March 1930 Budapest, Hungary
- Died: 24 January 1996 (aged 65) Budapest, Hungary
- Height: 1.70 m (5 ft 7 in)
- Weight: 65 kg (143 lb)

Sport
- Sport: Long-distance and middle-distance running
- Club: Budapest Honvéd

Sándor Iharos (10 March 1930 – 24 January 1996) was a Hungarian long-distance runner. Though unsuccessful in major competitions, Iharos ran world records over multiple distances and is one of only two athletes (the other being nine-time Olympic champion Paavo Nurmi) to have held outdoor world records over 1500 metres, 5000 metres and 10,000 metres. Iharos was one of the star pupils of the famous coach Mihály Iglói.

== World records ==
Iharos competed, without major success, in the 1952 Summer Olympics and 1954 European Championships. In 1955, however, Iharos turned a world-beater. His first individual world record (he had already been a part of two record-breaking Hungarian teams in the rare 4×1500 metres relay) was 7:55.6 minutes over 3000 metres, run on 14 May. After this, Iharos broke in a rapid succession the world records for two miles (8:33.4), 1500 metres (3:40.8) and 5000 metres (13:50.8). The 5000 m record only stood eight days before broken by Volodymyr Kuts, but Iharos reclaimed it with a time of 13:40.6 on 23 October 1955.

Iharos' records didn't last long, however. The 5000 m record was broken again on 19 June 1956 by Gordon Pirie, and this time he wasn't able to reclaim it. The 1500 m record was first equalled by László Tábori and then beaten on 3 August 1956 by István Rózsavölgyi – both fellow Hungarians and pupils of Iglói. Iharos ran a new record on 15 July 1956, 28:42.8 over 10,000 metres, but this was smashed less than two months later by Kuts.

== Decline ==
That would be Iharos' last individual record. (He'd be part of another Hungarian team effort in another rarely contested relay, 4 × one mile, in 1959.) The Hungarian team's date of departure for the 1956 Olympics in late October coincided with the beginning of the Hungarian Revolution of 1956. Iharos left Hungary, but not for Australia, citing an ankle injury. There has been speculation whether an injury or the political situation kept him from competing.

Iglói, however, did leave for Australia – and didn't return to Hungary again. Without his coach and mentor Iharos soon lost his record-breaking form. He competed in the Olympics again in 1960, but without much success.

Records
Preceded by (Belgium) Gaston Reiff	Men's 3000 m World Record Holder; 14 May 1955 – 4 September 1956	Succeeded by (United Kingdom) Gordon Pirie
Preceded by (Belgium) Gaston Reiff	Men's 2 mile World Record Holder; 30 May 1955 – 7 August 1958	Succeeded by (Australia) Albie Thomas
Preceded by (Australia) John Landy	Men's 1500 m World Record Holder; 28 July 1955 – 3 August 1956	Succeeded by (Hungary) István Rózsavölgyi
Preceded by (Soviet Union) Volodymyr Kuts	Men's 5000 metres World Record Holder; 10 September 1955 – 18 September 1955	Succeeded by (Soviet Union) Volodymyr Kuts
Preceded by (Soviet Union) Volodymyr Kuts	Men's 5000 metres World Record Holder; 23 October 1955 – 19 June 1956	Succeeded by (United Kingdom) Gordon Pirie
Preceded by (Czechoslovakia) Emil Zátopek	Men's 10,000 m World Record Holder; 15 July 1956 – 11 September 1956	Succeeded by (Soviet Union) Volodymyr Kuts
