= Pierre Page (athlete) =

Swiss long-distance runner

Personal information
- Nationality: Swiss
- Born: 8 March 1927
- Died: 20 October 2013 (aged 86)

Sport
- Sport: Long-distance running
- Event: 5000 metres

Pierre Page (8 March 1927 – 20 October 2013) was a Swiss long-distance runner. He competed in the men's 5000 metres at the 1952 Summer Olympics.
