= Béla Juhász =

Hungarian long-distance runner

Béla Juhász (20 April 1921 – 15 June 2002) was a Hungarian long-distance runner who competed in the 1952 Summer Olympics. He was born in Nagykáta and died in Budapest.
