= Vladimir Kuts =

Soviet long-distance runner

Vladimir Kuts Volodymyr Kuts
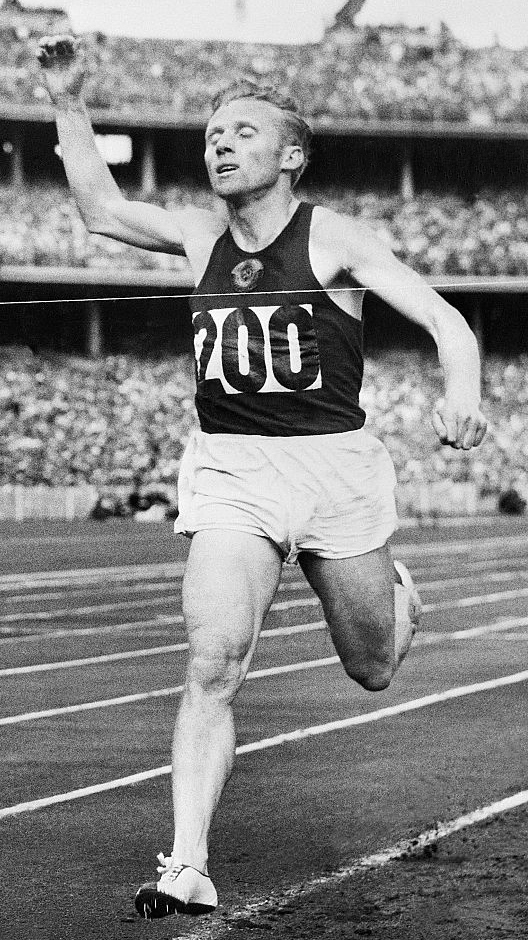
- Kuts winning the 5000 m Olympic final in 1956.

Personal information
- Born: 7 February 1927 Oleksyne, Ukrainian SSR, Soviet Union
- Died: 16 August 1975 (aged 48) Moscow, Russian SFSR, Soviet Union
- Height: 1.72 m (5 ft 8 in)
- Weight: 72 kg (159 lb)

Sport
- Sport: Running
- Events: 5000 m, 10,000 m
- Club: VP Leningrad
- Coached by: Grigory Nikiforov

Achievements and titles
- Personal bests: 5000 m – 13:35.0 (1957); 10000 m – 28:30.4 (1956)
Medal record
Men's athletics
Representing Soviet Union
Olympic Games
Gold medal – first place	1956 Melbourne	5000 m
Gold medal – first place	1956 Melbourne	10,000 m
European Championships
Gold medal – first place	1954 Bern	5000 m

Volodymyr Petrovych Kuts (Ukrainian: Володимир Петрович Куц, Russian: Владимир Петрович Куц, 7 February 1927 – 16 August 1975) was a Soviet long-distance runner. He won the 5000 and 10000 m races at the 1956 Olympics, setting Olympic records in both events.

== Biography ==
Kuts was born in Oleksyne, Ukrainian SSR, USSR. His father died due to alcoholism when Kuts was five years old. During World War II he falsified his age and served two years with the Soviet Army as a courier. He took up running after the war, while continuing his military service as a navy sniper. In 1951 he won his first national titles, in the 5000 and 10000 m, an achievement he repeated in 1953–1956. His first international success came in 1954, when he defeated the favourites – Emil Zátopek and Christopher Chataway – in the 5000 m at the European Championships, setting a new world record. He lost the world record months later to Chataway (who beat him narrowly), only to take it back 10 days later.

Having lost his world record again in 1955, Kuts was still one of the favourites for the 1956 Summer Olympics in Melbourne. His chief opponent in the 5000 m was British runner Gordon Pirie, who had broken the world record earlier that year. However, Kuts had set a new 10,000 metres world record shortly before the Games. In the first final, the 10,000 m, Kuts – as always – led from the start, finally breaking Pirie's spirit 4 laps from the end and winning by a wide margin. He broke away from Pirie with a final, desperate sprint, and admitted later that had Pirie stayed with him on that sprint, he might have dropped out due to fatigue. The 5,000 m final 5 days later ended in a similar fashion, with Kuts leading from start to finish. His winning margin of 11 seconds was the largest ever for this event in Olympic history.

Kuts improved the 5000 m world record in 1957 to 13:35.0 minutes, a time which would remain unbeaten until 1965, when it was bettered by Australia's Ron Clarke. Although he was only beaten on a couple of occasions, Kuts retired at the age of 32 in 1959. He had often suffered from pains in his stomach and legs, which he once froze while serving in the Navy. These problems severely hindered his training in 1957–1959 and followed him for the rest of his life.

After retiring from competitions Kuts worked as an athletics coach. He suffered a stroke after a traffic accident in 1972, and hence was not allowed to accompany his several trainees at the 1972 Olympics. He died in 1975, in an apparent suicide from mixing sleeping pills and alcohol. Near the end of his life he weighed about 120 kg, approximately 50 kg heavier than usual.

Kuts was married twice, first to Raisa Andreyevna Kuts and then to Raisa Timofeyevna Kuts. He met his first wife in 1953, when she was taking his interviews as a journalist. She later taught him Russian grammar, as Kuts completed only six years of school before the start of World War II, and often mixed up Russian and Ukrainian languages. They had a son Yuri, who became a scientist. After a second divorce in 1973, Kuts didn't remarry.

== Legacy ==
In 1985, in the city of Trostianets, a monument was erected in his name near the Kuts Stadium.

== Sources ==
- Vladimir Kuts (1962). From a Newbie to Master of Sport (in Russian). Moscow: Voenizdat. Archived from the original on 9 February 2007.

Records
Preceded by Emil Zátopek; Chris Chataway; Sándor Iharos; Gordon Pirie	Men's 5000 m World Record Holder; 29 August 1954 – 13 October 1954; 23 October 1954 – 10 September 1955; 18 September 1955 – 23 October 1955; 13 October 1957 – 16 January 1965	Succeeded by Chris Chataway; Sándor Iharos; Sándor Iharos; Ron Clarke
Preceded by Sándor Iharos	Men's 10,000 m World Record Holder; 11 September 1956 – 15 October 1960	Succeeded by Pyotr Bolotnikov
