= Kurt Rötzer =

Austrian long-distance runner

Personal information
- Nationality: Austrian
- Born: 7 June 1921
- Died: 20 May 1984 (aged 62)

Sport
- Sport: Long-distance running
- Event: 5000 metres

Kurt Rötzer (7 June 1921 – 20 May 1984) was an Austrian long-distance runner. He competed in the men's 5000 metres at the 1952 Summer Olympics.
