= Ivan Cherniavskyi =

Ukrainian long-distance runner

Personal information
- Full name: Ivan Yeremiyovych Cherniavskyi
- Nationality: Ukrainian
- Born: 4 August 1930 Kutsivka, Smila Raion
- Died: March 1, 2001 (aged 70)

Sport
- Sport: Long-distance running
- Event: 5000 metres
- Club: Kolhospnyk

Ivan Cherniavskyi (4 August 1930 – 2001) was a Ukrainian long-distance runner. He competed in the men's 5000 metres at the 1956 Summer Olympics, representing the Soviet Union.
