= Åke Andersson (athlete) =

Swedish long-distance runner

Åke Andersson (2 September 1925 – 3 March 2005) was a Swedish long-distance runner who competed in the 1952 Summer Olympics.
