= Miklós Szabó (long-distance runner) =

Hungarian long-distance runner (1928–2022)

Personal information
- Nationality: Hungarian
- Born: 22 December 1928 Kecskemét, Hungary
- Died: 29 June 2022 (aged 93)

Sport
- Sport: Long-distance running
- Event: 5000 metres

Miklós Szabó (22 December 1928 – 29 June 2022) was a Hungarian long-distance runner. He competed in the 5000 metres at the 1956 Summer Olympics and the 1960 Summer Olympics.
