= Kanuti Sum =

Kenyan athlete

Personal information
- Nationality: Kenyan
- Born: 1934

Sport
- Sport: Long-distance running
- Event: Marathon

Kanuti Sum (1934 – before 2007) was a Kenyan long-distance runner. He competed in the marathon at the 1956 Summer Olympics and the 1960 Summer Olympics. Outside of the Olympics, Sum was an athlete at the 1958 British Empire and Commonwealth Games. In his events, Sum had a top eight finish in the six mile and marathon events while finishing the three miles event in eighteenth.
