= Nyandika Maiyoro =

Kenyan long-distance runner (1931–2019)

Personal information
- Nationality: Kenyan
- Born: 1931 Kiogoro, Kisii, Kenya
- Died: 24 February 2019 (aged 87–88) Kisii, Kenya
- Height: 170 cm (5 ft 7 in)
- Weight: 60 kg (132 lb)

Sport
- Sport: Athletics
- Event: 5,000m

Nyantika Maiyoro MBE (1931 – 24 February 2019) was a Kenyan long-distance runner.

== Biography ==
Maiyoro attended Nyakegogi Primary School but dropped out after five years to concentrate on his athletics career. He was coached by the paramount chief Musa Nyandusi. He won the 3000 m race at the 1953 Indian Ocean Games in Madagascar, despite having started the race late and joined it when other runners had run more than 100 metres.

He then competed at the 1954 Commonwealth Games, the first major international championships that Kenya participated in. He was fourth in the three miles race. At the 1956 Summer Olympics he finished 7th in the 5000 m race. He competed at the 1958 Commonwealth games, but did not perform very well. Two years later, at the 1960 Summer Olympics he was 6th in the 5000 m race. His time of 13:52.8 minutes was a new African record. He retired from running in 1964.

After retirement, Maiyoro worked as a Nyamira District Sports Officer and later a Gusii Stadium manager. Later, he retired to his farm, located in the Borabu District, which was donated to him by the then-president Jomo Kenyatta. After the 1954 Commonwealth Games he was also given a house (at Gusii Stadium) by Senior Chief Musa Nyandusi. After he retired from his job as a stadium manager, the house was seized by the Gusii municipal council, who claimed that the house was allocated to him only as a housing benefit while he was working for the council as a stadium manager. However, after the issue was highlighted by the Kenyan media, the Prime minister Raila Odinga ordered the house to be returned to Maiyoro.

He had two wives (Mogute and Pasticha) and 14 children. Maiyoro, who ran for Kenya under colonial times, was awarded a MBE honour.
