= Øistein Saksvik =

Norwegian long-distance runner

Øistein Saksvik (7 January 1925 – 10 November 1998) was a Norwegian long-distance runner. He specialized in the 5,000-metre and the 10,000-metre runs, as well as in cross country running. At the 1952 Olympic Games, he competed in the 5,000-meter run. Saksvik became the Norwegian champion twenty times, a national record. In addition, he captured three Norwegian records in long-distance running from Martin Stokken, and held onto them for some years each. In the late-1950s, Saksvik's dominance in Norwegian long-distance running was eclipsed by Tor Torgersen and fellow Ranheim club member Ernst "Kruska" Larsen, later Thor Helland.

== Athletic career ==
Saksvik competed in several international championships. In his first, the Olympic 5000 metres in 1952, he did not progress from the heats. However, at the 1954 European Championships, he finished seventh in both 5000 and 10,000 metres. He later finished fourteenth in the 10,000 metres at the 1958 European Championships.

Saksvik is also known for winning twenty Norwegian championship titles in athletics, a Norwegian record which is tied with thrower Knut Hjeltnes. On the track he became Norwegian champion in the 5000 metres in 1950, 1952, 1953, 1954 and 1957, alternating mostly with cityfellows Martin Stokken and Ernst "Kruska" Larsen. He also won silver medals in this distance in 1949, 1951 and 1955. He won the 10,000 metres in 1953, 1954, 1956 and 1957. By winning his first gold medal, Saksvik ended the six-year dominance of Martin Stokken. However, in 1958 Saksvik only won the silver, behind club fellow Ernst "Kruska" Larsen.

Saksvik also set several Norwegian records. In the 3000 metres, he beat Martin Stokken's record in 1952 with the time 8:22.4, and broke his own record four times. His last record, 8:10.8 achieved at Bislett stadion in August 1955, stood for a year until overcome by Ernst "Kruska" Larsen. Saksvik is still the oldest record setter in the event. In the 5000 metres, he also broke Martin Stokken's record in 1952, improved it once, lost it to Stokken in 1954 and then regained it before the same thing happened with Ernst Larsen. Saksvik held his last record, 14:12.2 achieved at Bislett, from September 1955 and thirteen months until Larsen regained it. Lastly, he broke Stokken's 10,000 metre record in August 1952 in Copenhagen, a record which was only a week old. Saksvik improved it from 29:48.4 to 29:43.2 in September 1955 in Frankfurt an der Oder. It stood until 1959 when overcome by Tor Torgersen.

Saksvik also dominated Norwegian cross-country running in the early 1950s. His first medal was a silver in the cross-country forest course, achieved when he represented IL i BUL in 1949. He proceeded to win the race in 1953, 1955, 1956, 1958, 1959 and 1960. He won the 3 kilometre cross-country championship in 1952, 1953 and 1955 with silver medals in 1950, 1957 and 1958, and the 8 kilometre event in 1956 and 1957 with a silver medal in 1951.

He represented the club Ranheim IL. His personal best times were 8:10.8 in the 3000 metres, 14:12.2 in the 5000 metres and 29:43.2 in the 10,000 metres. In middle distance races he had 3:54.6 in the 1500 metres. All these personal bests were set in 1955. Saksvik was also a good cross-country skier, winning a national championship gold medal in relay in 1953.
