= Thor Helland =

Norwegian long-distance runner (1936–2021)

Personal information
- Full name: Thor Oluf Helland
- Nationality: Norwegian
- Born: 10 December 1936 Sørfold Municipality, Nordland
- Died: 2 August 2021 (aged 84)
- Height: 1.78 m (5 ft 10 in)
- Weight: 65 kg (143 lb)

Sport
- Event: 5,000 metres

Achievements and titles
- Personal best: 13.37.4 (1965)

Thor Helland (10 December 1936 – 2 August 2021) was a Norwegian long-distance runner who specialized in the 5000 metres.

Helland was born in Sørfold Municipality in Nordland county, Norway.

At the 1964 Summer Olympics he finished eighth in the 5000m final in 13:57.0 minutes. He became Norwegian champion 12 times in the years 1961 to 1967. He represented the club IL i BUL.

His personal best time was 13:37.4 minutes, achieved in June 1965 in Helsinki. He held the Norwegian record for 3000m three times, 5000m two times, and 10,000m once. He also held the Nordic record for 5000m and 3000m in 1965.

He and his wife, Unni Helland, an athlete herself, have contributed to their club IL i BUL as coaches. In 2020 they were still actively training and supporting the new generation of athletes.

Thor and Unni Helland lived in Oslo, Norway and have two children together, Ståle (b.1961) and Lasse (b.1963). They also have two granddaughters: Anine (b.1992) and Emilie Josephine (b.1993).
