= Arere Anentia =

Kenyan long-distance runner

Personal information
- Born: 1931
- Died: 1979 (aged 47–48)
Medal record
Men's Athletics
Representing Kenya
British Empire and Commonwealth Games
Bronze medal – third place	1958 Cardiff	6 miles

Arere Anentia (1931–1979) was a long-distance runner from Kenya.

Anentia competed at the 1956 Summer Olympics, but failed to advance past 5000 metres heats. He won 3 miles at the 1958 AAA Championships At the 1958 British Empire and Commonwealth Games, he finished third in the 6 miles race. By this result he became the first Kenyan athlete to win a medal at any intercontinental championships, together with Bartonjo Rotich, who won bronze medal over 440 Yards Hurdles. He competed at the 1960 Summer Olympics and finished 19th over 10000 metres and was to participate the marathon race, but did not start.
