= Thyge Thøgersen =

Danish long-distance runner

Personal information
- Nationality: Danish
- Born: 4 November 1926 Tønder, Denmark
- Died: 18 February 2016 (aged 89)

Sport
- Sport: Long-distance running
- Event: Marathon

Thyge Thøgersen (4 November 1926 – 18 February 2016) was a Danish long-distance runner. He competed at the 1952, 1956 and the 1960 Summer Olympics, placing 24th at 10,000 metres in the 1952, 6th in the 1960 marathon and 8th at 5000 metres in 1956.
