= Al Lawrence (runner) =

Australian long-distance runner

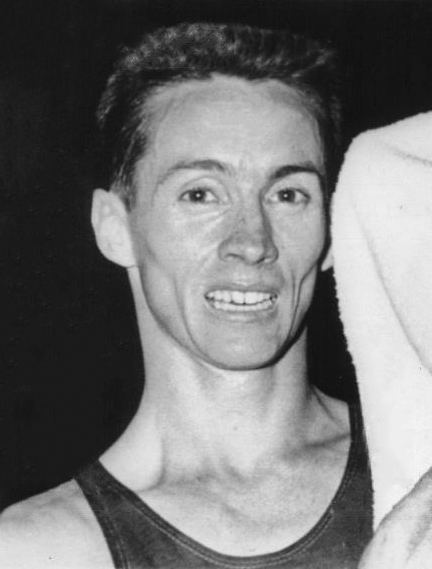
- Lawrence in 1960

Personal information
- Full name: Allan Cleave Evan Lawrence
- Born: 30 July 1930 Punchbowl, New South Wales, Australia
- Died: 15 May 2017 (aged 86) Houston, Texas, U.S.
- Height: 5 ft 7 in (170 cm)
- Weight: 134 lb (61 kg)

Sport
- Sport: Athletics
- Event: 5000 m – marathon
- Club: Botany Harriers, Sydney; Randwick Botany Harriers, Sydney

Achievements and titles
- Personal bests: 5000 m – 13:54.2 (1957); 10,000 m – 28:53.59 (1956); Mar – 2:26:43 (1953)
Medal record
Men's athletics
Representing Australia
Olympic Games
Bronze medal – third place	1956 Melbourne	10,000 m

Allan Cleave Evan Lawrence (9 July 1930 – 15 May 2017) was an Australian long-distance runner. He won a bronze medal for Australia in the 1956 Summer Olympics.

Lawrence was born in the Sydney suburb of Punchbowl. He competed for Australia in the 1956 Summer Olympics held in Melbourne, Australia in the 10,000 metres where he won the bronze medal, clocking 28:53 (nearly 30 seconds faster than he had ever run before). He also qualified for the 5,000 metre final, but did not compete due to a strained leg muscle.

Two years later, he came to the University of Houston to run for the Cougars. In 1959–60, he captured consecutive NCAA cross-country titles and followed each with an AAU XC win. In 1960, he set a world indoor two-mile record with 8:46. Six days later, he won the AAU three-mile with another world record of 13:26. He was the only male runner to win both the NCAA and AAU Cross Country individual championship in the same year until 1992 (Bob Kennedy).

At the 1960 Olympic games in Rome, he placed fourth in the 5,000 metre heats, did not finish the 10,000 metres and placed a disappointing 54th in the marathon in 2:37.

During his career, he broke over 10 Australian records from 2 miles to 10,000m and was the first Australian to break 14 minutes for 5000m and 30 and 29 minutes for 10,000m.

Lawrence returned to America where he became an American citizen in the early 1980s. He formed the Al Lawrence Running Club in Houston, which remains strong today. He co-authored 3 books with Mark Scheid, "The Self-Coached Runner", "The Self-Coached Runner II", "Running and Racing after 35" and an Autobiography "To Olympus and Beyond" (A Story of Life, Sport, and Love on Four Continents)

== Personal life ==
He is great uncle of British runner Michael Clark.
