= József Kovács (runner) =

Hungarian long-distance runner

Medal record

Men's athletics

Representing Hungary

Olympic Games
Silver medal – second place	1956 Melbourne	10,000 m

European Championships
Silver medal – second place	1954 Bern	10,000 m

József Kovács (3 March 1926 – 29 March 1987) was a Hungarian athlete who competed mainly in the 10,000 metres.

Born in Nyíregyháza, Szabolcs-Szatmár-Bereg he competed for Hungary in the 1956 Summer Olympics held in Melbourne, Australia in the 10,000 metres where he won the silver medal.
