= Ilmari Taipale =

Finnish long-distance runner

Ilmari Richard Taipale (18 May 1928 in Tampere – 22 March 2008 in Porvoo) was a Finnish long-distance runner who competed in the 1952 Summer Olympics and in the 1956 Summer Olympics.
