= Peter Driver =

British long-distance runner

Personal information
- Nationality: British (English)
- Born: 26 June 1932 West Ham, London, England
- Died: 12 November 1971 (aged 39)

Sport
- Sport: Athletics
- Event: long distance
- Club: South London Harriers
Medal record
Representing Great Britain
British Empire and Commonwealth Games
Gold medal – first place	1954 Vancouver	6 miles

Peter Brian Driver (26 June 1932 – 12 November 1971) was a British track and field athlete who competed in long-distance running events and was a Commonwealth Games gold medal winner.

== Biography ==
Born in London and a member of South London Harriers, he won the national junior title in cross country in 1953.

Driver became the British 6 miles champion after winning the British AAA Championships title at the 1954 AAA Championships.

Shortly afterwards he represented the England team and was the gold medallist in the six-mile run at the 1954 British Empire and Commonwealth Games. His winning time of minutes was a games record and the first time anyone had run the distance in under half an hour at the tournament. He also ran the 3-mile race at that games, placing fifth.

Driver made one other major appearance internationally, taking sixth place in the 10,000 metres at the 1954 European Athletics Championships.

Driver became honorary club secretary of Fleet & Crookham AC. A year after his death the club founded the Peter Driver Memorial Road Races, including a six-mile race in recognition of his Commonwealth victory, which is now known as the Fleet 10K run. Later, the Fleet and Crookham Athletic Club named their ground the 'Peter Driver Sports Ground'.

== International competitions ==
Year	Competition	Venue	Position	Event	Notes
1954	European Championships	Bern, Switzerland	6th	10,000 m	30:03.6
1954	British Empire and Commonwealth Games	Vancouver, Canada	5th	3 miles	13:47.0
1954	British Empire and Commonwealth Games	Vancouver, Canada	1st	6 miles	29:09.4 GR
