= Herbert Schade =

German long-distance runner

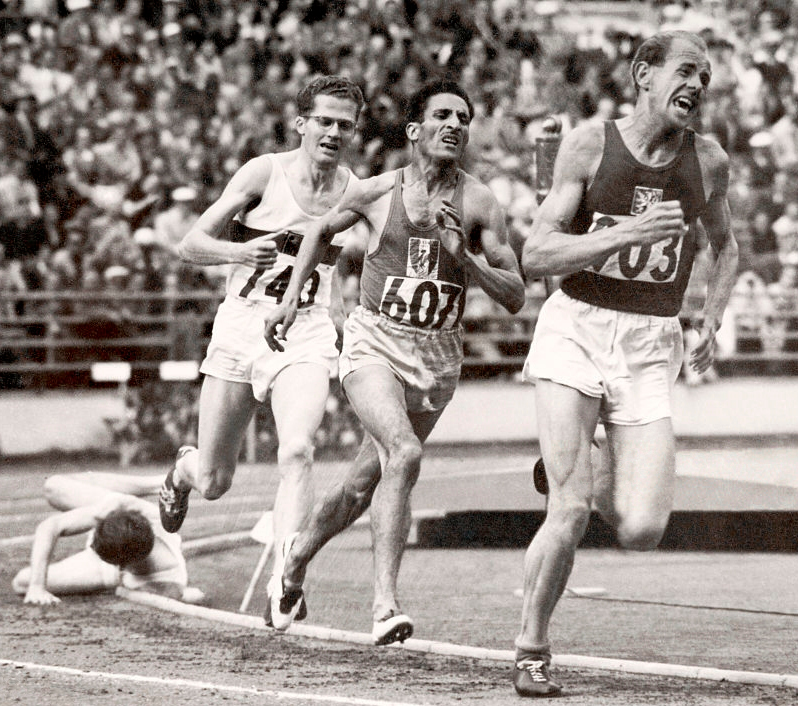
- Schade chasing Mimoun and Zátopek in the 5000 m final at the 1952 Olympics

Personal information
- Born: 26 May 1922 Solingen, Weimar Republic
- Died: 1 March 1994 (aged 71) Solingen, Germany
- Height: 179 cm (5 ft 10 in)
- Weight: 65 kg (143 lb)

Sport
- Sport: Athletics
- Event(s): 5000 m, 10000 m
- Club: Solinger Leichtathletik Club

Achievements and titles
- Personal best(s): 5000 m – 14:06.6 (1952); 10000 m – 29:24.8 (1952)
Medal record
Representing Germany
Olympic Games
Bronze medal – third place	1952 Helsinki	5000 m

Herbert Otto Emanuel Schade (26 May 1922 – 1 March 1994) was a West German long-distance runner who competed for Germany at the 1952 Summer Olympics and for the United Team of Germany at the 1956 Summer Olympics. In 1952 he won a bronze medal in the 5000 m event, behind Alain Mimoun and Emil Zátopek. Four years later he placed 12th over 5000 m and 9th over 10,000 m. Schade won eight West German titles in these two events and finished fourth in the 10,000 m at the 1954 European Championships.

Schade was a baker by profession. In 1958 he retired from competitions and published an autobiography Als Leichtathlet in 5 Erdteilen (As a Track and Field Athlete in Five Continents). He then coached long-distance runners at the national level and took various administrative position in German regional athletics associations. He was a member of the jury for athletics events at the 1972 Munich Olympics. In 1978–90 together with his wife he headed the Association of Former Athletes.
