= Christopher Chataway =

British runner, broadcaster and politician (1931–2014)

The Right Honourable Sir Christopher Chataway
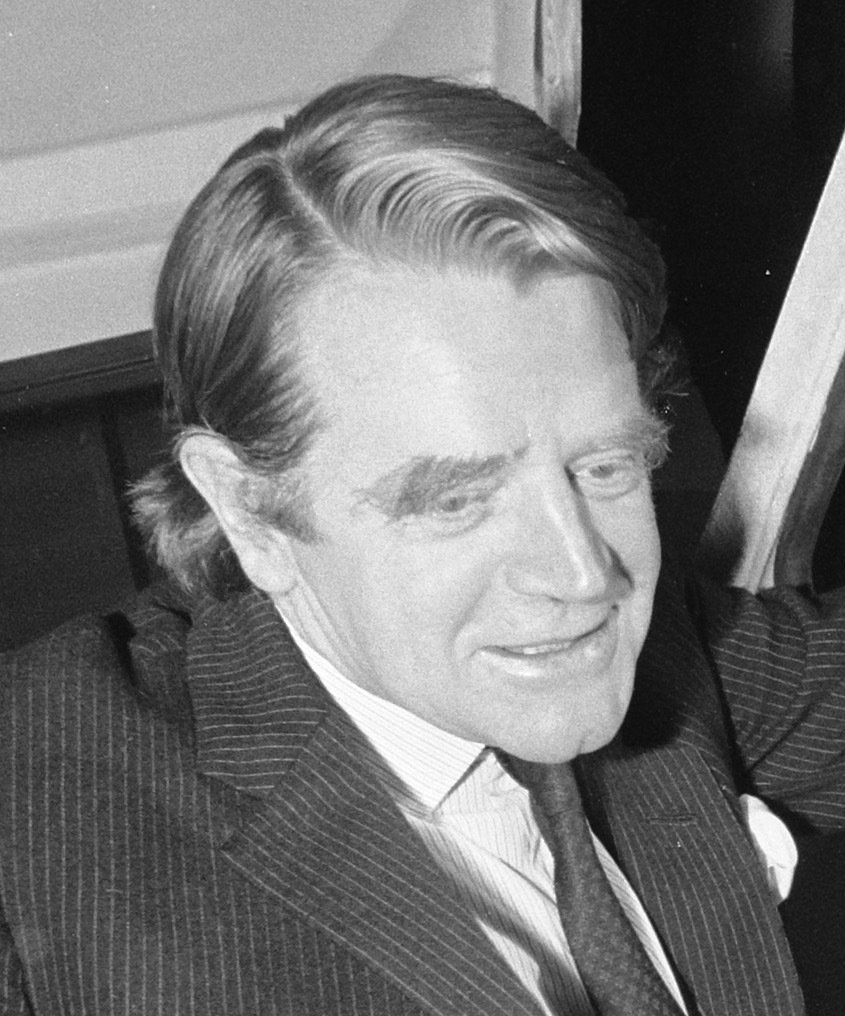
- Chataway in 1972

Minister of Posts and Telecommunications
- In office 24 June 1970 – 7 April 1972
- Prime Minister: Edward Heath
- Preceded by: John Stonehouse
- Succeeded by: John Eden

Member of Parliament for Lewisham North
- In office 8 October 1959 – 10 March 1966
- Preceded by: Niall MacDermot
- Succeeded by: Roland Moyle

Member of Parliament for Chichester
- In office 22 May 1969 – 20 September 1974
- Preceded by: Walter Loveys
- Succeeded by: Anthony Nelson

Personal details
- Born: 31 January 1931 Chelsea, London, England
- Died: 19 January 2014 (aged 82) St John's Wood, London, England
- Party: Conservative
- Education: Sherborne School
- Alma mater: Magdalen College, Oxford
- Profession: Politician, athlete, broadcaster
- Sports career
- Height: 175 cm (5 ft 9 in)
- Weight: 69 kg (152 lb)
- Sport: Athletics
- Event: middle/long-distance
- Club: Walton AC; Achilles Club
Medal record
Men's athletics
Representing Great Britain
European Championships
Silver medal – second place	1954 Bern	5000 metres
Representing England
British Empire and Commonwealth Games
Gold medal – first place	1954 Vancouver	3 miles

Sir Christopher John Chataway (31 January 1931 – 19 January 2014) was a British middle- and long-distance runner, television news broadcaster and Conservative politician.

== Education ==
Chataway was born in Chelsea, London, the son of James Denys Percival Chataway (died 1953) and Margaret Pritchard, née Smith (died 1988). He spent his childhood in the Anglo-Egyptian Sudan as his father was a district commissioner in the Sudan Political Service. He was educated at Sherborne School — where he excelled at rugby, boxing and gymnastics but did not win a race until he was 16. — and Magdalen College, Oxford, where he gained a philosophy, politics and economics degree, His studies were outshone by his success on the athletics track as a long-distance runner.

== Athletics career ==
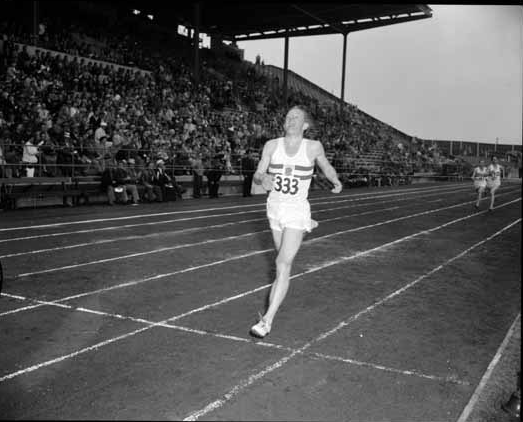
1954 British Empire and Commonwealth Games, Chataway wins the 3 miles race in a new games record. Attribution:Province newspaper

Chataway had a short but distinguished athletics career. At the Helsinki Olympic Games of 1952, in the 5000 metres final, after being passed on the last bend by the Czech long-distance runner, Emil Zátopek, France's Alain Mimoun, and West Germany's Herbert Schade, Chataway's foot brushed the curb and he crashed headlong to the ground. Chataway managed to finish the race in fifth place. On leaving university he took an executive job with Guinness. When Sir Hugh Beaver of Guinness came up with the idea for the Guinness Book of Records, it was Chataway who suggested his old university friends Norris and Ross McWhirter as editors, knowing of their liking for facts.

Chataway continued with his running. When Roger Bannister ran the first sub-four-minute mile on 6 May 1954 at Oxford University's Iffley Road Track, Chataway and Chris Brasher were his pacemakers.

He represented the English team at the 1954 British Empire and Commonwealth Games held in Vancouver, Canada, where he won the gold medal in the 3 miles event. He then finished in second place in the 5000m at the European Athletics Championship of 1954, 12.2 seconds behind the winner Vladimir Kuts, but two weeks later turned the tables at a London v. Moscow athletics competition at White City, setting a world record time of 13 minutes 51.6 seconds. The contest was televised via the Eurovision network and made Chataway a sporting celebrity: that December he won the first BBC Sports Personality of the Year award.

After competing in the 1956 Olympics, Chataway retired from international athletics, though he continued to race for Thames Hare and Hounds.

== Broadcasting and politics ==
Soon after leaving Oxford with a degree in politics, philosophy and economics, he decided to aim for a political career. He thought a suitable job in the rapidly expanding world of television might help. He refused offers in sports TV and with panel and quiz shows but secured a job in August 1955 with ITN. He, Robin Day, and Barbara Mandell, were its first newscasters. After six months, when loss-making ITV cut back on its news output, Chataway switched to the BBC and was for three and a half years one of Panorama's team of reporters with a different assignment each week, sometimes at home but usually abroad. By this time, he was also considering another career, this time in politics. He had been narrowly elected as a Conservative to the London County Council in 1958 in Lewisham North, and was then selected to stand for Parliament in the same seat. Lewisham North was a highly marginal seat won by Labour in a by-election in 1957, but Chataway won the seat with a majority bigger than it had been in the previous general election.

His maiden speech expressed the hope that the England cricket team would refuse to play a tour in apartheid South Africa, a highly unusual opinion for a Conservative. In Parliament, Chataway took up the issue of refugees, especially in Africa, and campaigned so hard during World Refugee Year that he was awarded a Nansen Medal. He served as a Parliamentary Private Secretary before being appointed as a junior Education Minister in July 1962. In the 1964 election, his majority was slashed to 343 and the seat looked distinctly vulnerable; in 1966 he lost.

=== ILEA ===
In 1967 the Conservatives unexpectedly won control of the Inner London Education Authority and the party leadership was horrified to discover that their newly elected councillors were going to try to break up comprehensive schools and replace them with secondary modern and grammar schools. Chataway, with relevant ministerial experience, was persuaded to take over. He was elected an alderman and appointed leader of the education committee. Eventually cajoling his colleagues into a more moderate line, he avoided a head-on collision with Edward Short (the Labour Education Secretary) and proceeded with those schemes for secondary reorganisation that he regarded as well founded.

=== Heath government ===
Chataway was keen to return to Parliament, and the opportunity came in a byelection in Chichester in May 1969. He then resigned as ILEA Leader. With the return of a Conservative government in 1970, and after refusing the offer of sports minister, he was appointed by Edward Heath as Minister for Posts and Telecommunications and made a privy counsellor. In this post he took charge of introducing commercial radio for the first time, ending the BBC monopoly. He also introduced to parliament the complete end to the restrictions on broadcasting hours on television and radio. The restrictions on broadcasting hours were gradually eased from early 1971 and lifted fully in January 1972. After a reshuffle in April 1972 he was Minister for Industrial Development.

== Business career ==
When the Conservatives were defeated in the February 1974 election, Chataway announced his retirement from politics (at the age of 43) and did not seek re-election in October 1974. He then went into business becoming a managing director of Orion Bank, a consortium bank later acquired by one of its shareholders, the Royal Bank of Canada. He stayed with Orion, later as vice chairman, for 15 years. He held various non-executive directorships and was also the first chairman of Groundwork, the environmental charity, and hon. treasurer of the National Campaign for Electoral Reform.

His principal outside interest was ActionAid, a small overseas development charity, of which he became treasurer in 1974 and later chairman. By the time he left the board of trustees in 1999 ActionAid's annual turnover had grown to nearly £100 million. When Chataway's son Adam decided to launch a water project in Ethiopia in memory of his fiancée killed in a road traffic accident he chose to do it in partnership with ActionAid. Vicky's Water Project, opened in 2010, has transformed the lives of 20,000 people.

In 1991 Chataway was appointed chairman of the Civil Aviation Authority – a job he relished not least because his father had been one of the early aviators. He supported his friend Chris Brasher when he established the London Marathon, and was President of the Commonwealth Games Council for England from 1990 to 2009. He was knighted in the 1995 Birthday Honours for services to the aviation industry.

In the 2005 general election his stepson Charles Walker was elected as Conservative MP for Broxbourne.

== Personal life ==
He was married twice; firstly, to Anna Lett (1959; divorced 1975), with whom he had two sons and a daughter; and secondly, to Carola Walker (1976 to his death), with whom he had two further sons.

His stepson is the Conservative MP Charles Walker and his brother-in-law the former Conservative MP Peter Hordern.

== Death ==
Chataway suffered from cancer for the last two and a half years of his life. He died at St John's Hospice in north west London on 19 January 2014, twelve days before his 83rd birthday.

Parliament of the United Kingdom
Preceded by Niall MacDermot	Member of Parliament for Lewisham North; 1959 – 1966	Succeeded by Roland Moyle
Preceded by Walter Loveys	Member of Parliament for Chichester; 1969 – October 1974	Succeeded by Anthony Nelson
Educational offices
Preceded by Ashley Bramall as Chair	Leader of the Inner London Education Authority; 1967 – 1969	Succeeded by Lena Townsend
