= Gordon Pirie =

English long-distance runner

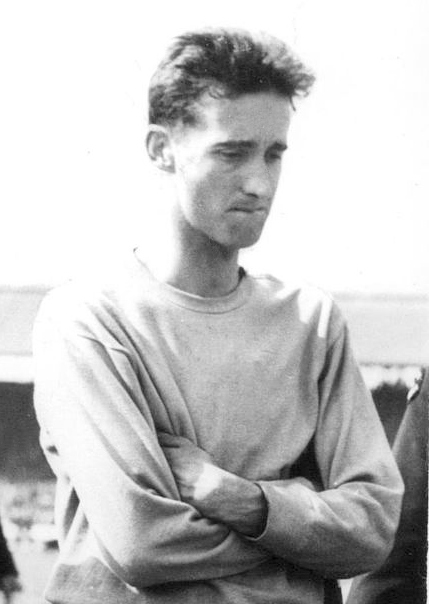
- Pirie in 1956

Personal information
- Full name: Douglas Alistair Gordon Pirie
- Born: 10 February 1931 Leeds, England
- Died: 7 December 1991 (aged 60) Lymington, England
- Height: 1.88 m (6 ft 2 in)
- Weight: 65 kg (143 lb)

Sport
- Sport: Running
- Club: South London Harriers

Achievements and titles
- Personal bests: 5000 m – 13:36.8 (1956); 10000 m – 29:15.49 (1960)
Medal record
Men's athletics
Representing Great Britain
Olympic Games
Silver medal – second place	1956 Melbourne	5,000 metres
European Championships
Bronze medal – third place	1958 Stockholm	5,000 metres

Douglas Alistair Gordon Pirie (10 February 1931 – 7 December 1991) was an English long-distance runner. He competed in the 5000 m and 10,000 m events at the 1952, 1956 and 1960 Olympics and won a silver medal in the 5000 m in 1956, placing fourth in 1952. Born in Leeds, Pirie grew up in Coulsdon, Surrey, and ran for the South London Harriers. He died of cholangiocarcinoma (bile duct cancer) in Lymington, Hampshire.

== Biography ==
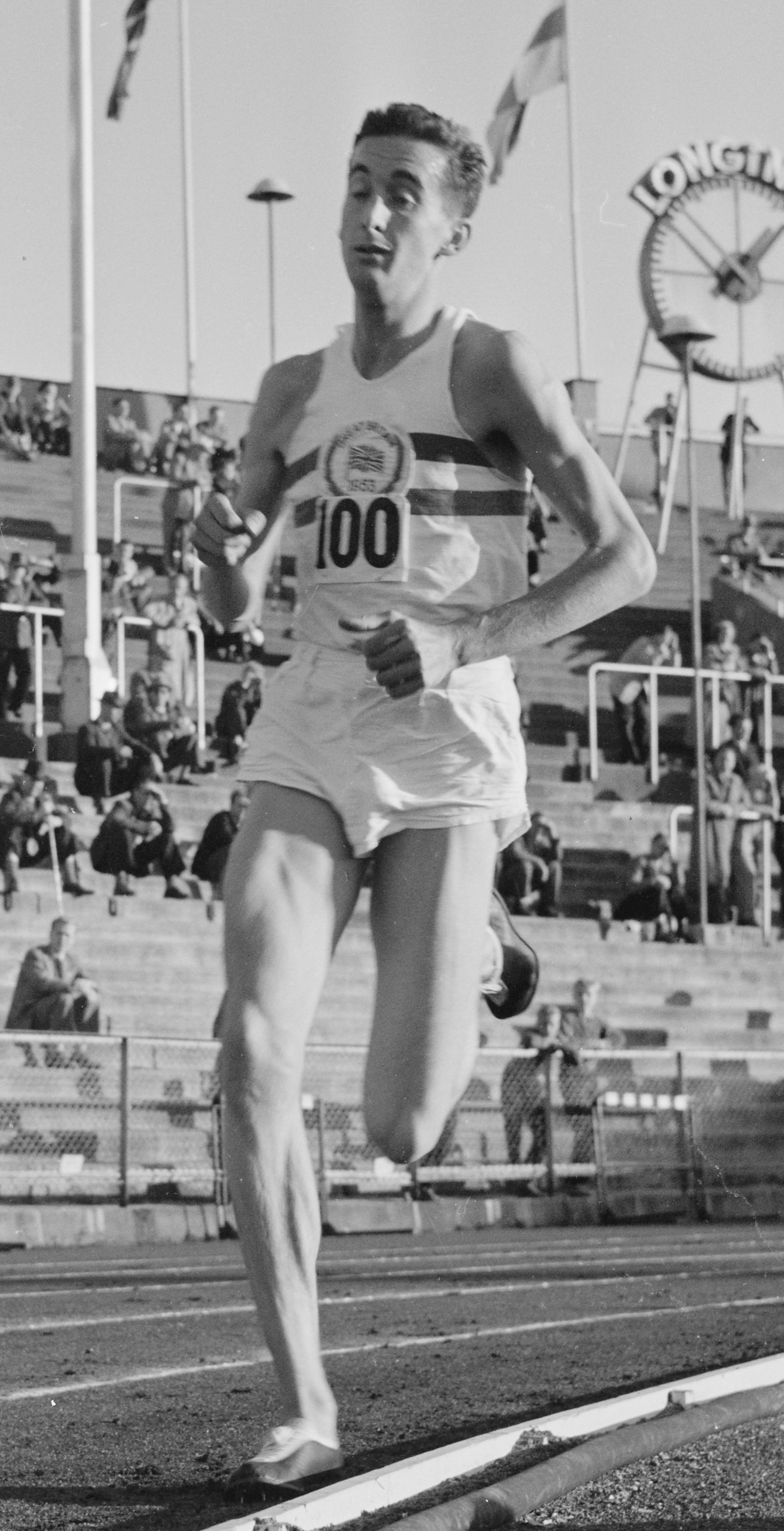
Gordon Pirie in Oslo in 1953

=== Early career ===
In 1955 Pirie won the BBC Sports Personality of the Year award. During that year he had beaten Emil Zátopek the triple gold medallist in distance running at the 1952 Olympics. Pirie was an exceptional cross-country runner, winning the English Championship three times.

Pirie broke five world records in the course of his career, his annus mirabilis being 1956, when on 19 June in Bergen, Norway, he ran 13:36.8 for 5,000 m, beating Vladimir Kuts (USSR), and knocking 25 seconds from his own personal best. On 22 June in Trondheim, Norway, he beat the world 3000 metres record with 7:55.5, and on 14 September, in Malmö, Sweden, he set a new record with 7:52.7.

He can be seen in film held by the Cinema Museum in London of the 1952 English Nationals Ref HMO362.

=== Melbourne Olympics 1956 ===
In the Olympics, held in Melbourne later that year, Pirie ran against Kuts in the 10,000 metres and despite the tactics of Kuts, an aggressive front runner whose bursts of speed were particularly damaging to a long-striding runner like Pirie, he stayed with him into the last mile when every other competitor had dropped well back. Kuts surrendered the lead for a short while, then made a sprint which Pirie could not match and he dropped back. Kuts said that if Pirie had stayed with him on that last sprint he would have dropped out of the race.

In the 5,000 metres Pirie took second place behind Kuts. Christopher Chataway, another British runner, had been selected on past performance. He had not competed at top level for more than a year as he was pursuing a media career. With Pirie and Derek Ibbotson, the third British runner, he was tracking Kuts and had moved ahead of them as they went into a bend. The Soviet runner was setting a much faster pace than Chataway had ever run. Chataway suffered an attack of stomach cramp which caused him to slow down, and as Pirie and Ibbotson came out of the bend they found that Kuts had opened a gap. Pirie and Ibbotson ran round Chataway but Kuts was able to exploit his advantage and won the race with a margin of 11 seconds, the largest ever for this event in Olympic history. For the latter stages of the race Pirie was running what was virtually a front race, as Kuts had broken away, but he was still strong enough to hold off a late challenge by Ibbotson.

== Between the Olympics ==
Pirie competed for England at the 1958 British Empire and Commonwealth Games and finished fourth in the 1-mile and 3-mile events.

=== Rome Olympics 1960 ===
The 1960 Rome Olympics were held in the height of the summer and Pirie and other leading British contestants asked to go on ahead of the main party, at their own expense, so that they might acclimatise to the heat. They were refused permission, on the grounds that "we travel as a team". Pirie and his fellow 5,000 metres contestants were eliminated in the heats, leaving Pirie's only chance of a gold medal the 10,000 metres held later in the games. Pirie followed the favourite, Murray Halberg of New Zealand.

Halberg had won his major championships by making a tactical burst in the last mile and holding on to the lead – he had won the 5,000 metres at Rome by that tactic and Pirie's plan was to stay with him as he went forward. Halberg was probably suffering from his effort in the earlier race and as the race went on he failed to stay with the leaders. Pirie realised that he and Halberg had lost contact with them.

=== Post-Olympic career ===
For some years, after he had criticised them, sections of the press ran a campaign against Pirie particularly after the Olympics. In a radio interview with Eamonn Andrews soon after the games, the Australian runner Herb Elliott, referred to Pirie and Ibbotson who, having broken the world record for the mile in 1957, had never regained the same form and was not selected for Rome. Elliott said, "The British Press is the most vicious in the world. Their attitude to people like Pirie and Ibbotson is 'That bloke's on his way down, I'm going to kick him down and keep him there.'" In 1960 Pirie ran a sub-four minute mile in Dublin, clocking 3:59.9.

Pirie won the British Orienteering Championships in its first two years, 1967 and 1968, and won the first edition of the JK Orienteering Festival. He also represented UK at the 1966 World Orienteering Championships, and again at the 1968 World Orienteering Championships.

The 1998 edition of The Guinness Book of Records lists Gordon Pirie under the "Greatest Mileage" entry, stating that he had run a total distance of 347,600 km (216,000 mi) in 40 years to 1981.

== Running Fast and Injury Free ==
In his book Running Fast and Injury Free Pirie advocated running with initially making ground contact with the midfoot (as opposed to the usual style of long steps with landing on heels), 3–5 steps per second to reduce fatigue, damage to feet, and wasting of energy on vertical movement of body. He also describes his collaboration with Adolf Dassler on designing running shoes with stronger toes (instead of the usual design with stronger heels) for better durability with his advocated running style.

Records
Preceded by Sandor Iharos	Men's world record holder in the 3000 metres 22 June 1956 – 27 June 1962	Succeeded by Michel Jazy
Awards
Preceded by Christopher Chataway	BBC Sports Personality of the Year; 1955	Succeeded by Jim Laker
