= 1950 European Athletics Championships – Men's 5000 metres =

Men's 5000 metres at the European Athletics Championships

The men's 5000 metres at the 1950 European Athletics Championships was held in Brussels, Belgium, at Heysel Stadium on 24 and 26 August 1950.

== Medalists ==
Gold	Emil Zátopek; Czechoslovakia
Silver	Alain Mimoun; France
Bronze	Gaston Reiff; Belgium

== Results ==
=== Final ===
26 August

Rank	Name	Nationality	Time	Notes
1st place, gold medalist(s)	Emil Zátopek	Czechoslovakia	14:03.0	CR NR
2nd place, silver medalist(s)	Alain Mimoun	France	14:26.0	
3rd place, bronze medalist(s)	Gaston Reiff	Belgium	14:26.2	
4	Väinö Mäkelä	Finland	14:30.8	
5	Hannu Posti	Finland	14:40.8	
6	Lucien Theys	Belgium	14:42.4	
7	Stevan Pavlović	Yugoslavia	14:50.2	
8	Alec Olney	Great Britain	14:51.8	
9	Božidar Đurašković	Yugoslavia	14:52.4	
10	Bertil Albertsson	Sweden	15:02.2	
11	Bertil Karlsson	Sweden	15:09.4	
	Jacques Vernier	France	DNF	

=== Heats ===
24 August

==== Heat 1 ====
Rank	Name	Nationality	Time	Notes
1	Emil Zátopek	Czechoslovakia	14:56.0	Q
2	Väinö Mäkelä	Finland	14:56.2	Q
3	Lucien Theys	Belgium	15:03.0	Q
4	Jacques Vernier	France	15:03.6	Q
5	Stevan Pavlović	Yugoslavia	15:06.2	Q
6	Bertil Karlsson	Sweden	15:07.2	Q
7	Vasilios Mavrapostolos	Greece	15:08.4	NR
8	Kurt Rötzer	Austria	15:08.4	NR
9	Aage Poulsen	Denmark	19:99.9	

==== Heat 2 ====
Rank	Name	Nationality	Time	Notes
1	Hannu Posti	Finland	14:47.2	Q
2	Alec Olney	Great Britain	14:55.6	Q
3	Božidar Đurašković	Yugoslavia	15:00.6	Q
4	Bertil Albertsson	Sweden	15:09.0	Q
5	Gaston Reiff	Belgium	15:10.0	Q
6	Alain Mimoun	France	15:11.0	Q
7	August Sutter	Switzerland	15:13.0	

== Participation ==
According to an unofficial count, 16 athletes from 11 countries participated in the event.

- Austria (1)
- Belgium (2)
- Czechoslovakia (1)
- Denmark (1)
- Finland (2)
- France (2)
- Greece (1)
- Sweden (2)
- Switzerland (1)
- Great Britain (1)
- Yugoslavia (2)
