= 1946 European Athletics Championships – Men's 5000 metres =

Men's 5000 metres at the European Athletics Championships

The men's 5000 metres at the 1946 European Athletics Championships was held in Oslo, Norway, at Bislett Stadion on 23 August 1946.

== Medalists ==
Gold	Sydney Wooderson; Great Britain
Silver	Wim Slijkhuis; Netherlands
Bronze	Evert Nyberg; Sweden

== Results ==
=== Final ===
23 August

Rank	Name	Nationality	Time	Notes
1st place, gold medalist(s)	Sydney Wooderson	Great Britain	14:08.6	CR, NR
2nd place, silver medalist(s)	Wim Slijkhuis	Netherlands	14:14.0	NR
3rd place, bronze medalist(s)	Evert Nyberg	Sweden	14:23.2	
4	Viljo Heino	Finland	14:24.4	
5	Emil Zátopek	Czechoslovakia	14:25.8	NR
6	Gaston Reiff	Belgium	14:45.8	
7	Rikard Greenfort	Denmark	14:46.0	
8	Raphaël Pujazon	France	14:46.8	
9	René Breistroffer	France	14:50.4	
10	Aage Poulsen	Denmark	14:53.6	
11	Charles Heirendt	Luxembourg	15:00.6	NR
12	Marcel Vandewattyne	Belgium	15:08.0	
13	András Pataki	Hungary	15:33.6	
14	Leon Aasbø	Norway	15:33.8	
	Napoleon Dzwonkowski	Poland	DNF	
	Helge Perälä	Finland	DNF	
	Åke Durkfeldt	Sweden	DNF	
	Arnt Rohme	Norway	DNF	

== Participation ==
According to an unofficial count, 18 athletes from 12 countries participated in the event.

- Belgium (2)
- Czechoslovakia (1)
- Denmark (2)
- Finland (2)
- France (2)
- Hungary (1)
- Luxembourg (1)
- Netherlands (1)
- Norway (2)
- Poland (1)
- Sweden (2)
- Great Britain (1)
