= Athletics at the 1948 Summer Olympics – Men's 10,000 metres =

Men's 10,000 metres at the Games of the XIV Olympiad
- Dates: July 30, 1948 (final)

Medalists
1st place, gold medalist(s)		Emil Zátopek; Czechoslovakia
2nd place, silver medalist(s)		Alain Mimoun; France
3rd place, bronze medalist(s)		Bertil Albertsson; Sweden

The men's 10,000 metres event at the 1948 Olympic Games took place July 30. The final was won by Emil Zátopek of Czechoslovakia.

== Records ==
Prior to the competition, the existing World and Olympic records were as follows.

World record	Viljo Heino (FIN)	29:35.4	Helsinki, Finland	25 August 1944
Olympic record	Janusz Kusociński (POL)	30:11.4	Los Angeles, United States	31 July 1932

The following new Olympic record was set during this competition:

Date	Event	Athlete	Time	Notes
30 July	Final	Emil Zátopek (TCH)	29:59.6	OR

== Schedule ==
All times are British Summer Time (UTC+1).

Date	Time	
Friday, 30 July 1948	18:00	Final

== Results ==
=== Final ===
Rank	Name	Nationality	Time (hand)	Notes
1st place, gold medalist(s)	Emil Zátopek	Czechoslovakia	29:59.6	OR
2nd place, silver medalist(s)	Alain Mimoun	France	30:47.4	
3rd place, bronze medalist(s)	Bertil Albertsson	Sweden	30:53.6	
4	Martin Stokken	Norway	30:58.6	
5	Severt Dennolf	Sweden	31:05.0	
6	Ben Saïd Abdallah	France	31:07.8	
7	Stan Cox	Great Britain	31:08.0	
8	Jim Peters	Great Britain	31:16.0	
9	Salomon Könönen	Finland	NT	
10	Eddie O'Toole	United States	NT	
11	Fred Wilt	United States	NT	
	Ricardo Bralo	Argentina	NT	
	Eusebio Guiñez	Argentina	NT	
	Jakob Kjersem	Norway	NT	
	Jef Lataster	Netherlands	NT	
	Lou Wen-ngau	Republic of China	NT	
	Steve McCooke	Great Britain	NT	
	Constantino Miranda	Spain	NT	
	Harry Nelson	New Zealand	NT	
	André Paris	France	NT	
	Manny Ramjohn	Trinidad and Tobago	NT	
	Gregorio Rojo	Spain	NT	
	Paddy Fahey	Ireland	DNF	
	Viljo Heino	Finland	DNF	
	Evert Heinström	Finland	DNF	
	Robert Everaert	Belgium	DNF	
	Herman Goffberg	United States	DNF	
	Ham Gi-yong	South Korea	DNS	
	Delfo Cabrera	Argentina	DNS	
	Vasilios Mavrapostolos	Greece	DNS	
	Jenő Szilágyi	Hungary	DNS	
	Sim Bok-seok	South Korea	DNS	

Key: DNF = Did not finish, DNS = Did not start, NT = Time not recorded, OR = Olympic record

== Notes ==
- Organising Committee for the XIV Olympiad, The (1948). "The Official Report of the Organising Committee for the XIV Olympiad" (PDF). LA84 Foundation. Archived from the original (PDF) on September 27, 2013.
