= Athletics at the 1948 Summer Olympics – Men's 5000 metres =

Men's 5000 metres at the Games of the XIV Olympiad
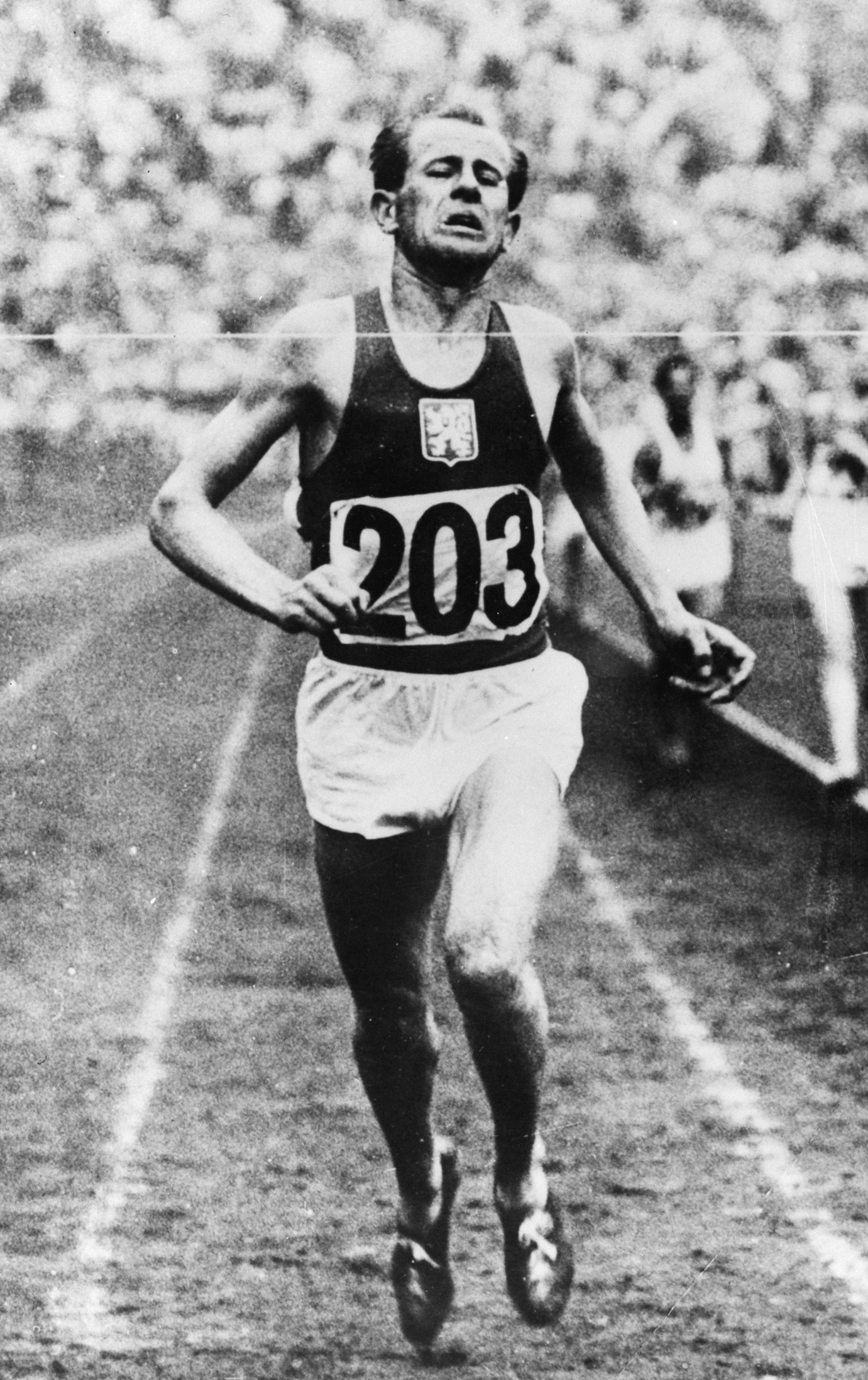
- Emil Zátopek
- Dates: July 31, 1948 (heats); August 2, 1948 (final)

Medalists
1st place, gold medalist(s)		Gaston Reiff; Belgium
2nd place, silver medalist(s)		Emil Zátopek; Czechoslovakia
3rd place, bronze medalist(s)		Willem Slijkhuis; Netherlands

Official Video Highlights

The men's 5000 metres event at the 1948 Olympic Games took place July 31 and August 2. The final was won by Gaston Reiff of Belgium. The Belgian Gaston Reiff became the Olympic champion ahead of the Czechoslovak Emil Zátopek. Willem Slijkhuis from the Netherlands won bronze.

== Records ==
Prior to the competition, the existing World and Olympic records were as follows.

World record	Gunder Hägg (SWE)	13:58.2	Gothenburg, Sweden	20 September 1942
Olympic record	Gunnar Höckert (FIN)	14:22.2	Berlin, Germany	7 August 1936

The following new Olympic record was set during this competition:

Date	Event	Athlete	Time	Notes
2 August	Final	Gaston Reiff (BEL)	14:17.6	OR

== Schedule ==
All times are British Summer Time (UTC+1).

Date	Time	
Saturday, 31 July 1948	16:00	Round 1
Monday, 2 August 1948	17:00	Final

== Results ==
The first four runners from each heat qualified to the final.

=== Heats ===
Heat 1

Rank	Country	Athletes	Time (hand)
1	Sweden	Evert Nyberg	14:58.2
2	Finland	Väinö Koskela	14:58.3
2	United States	Curt Stone	14:58.6
4	Belgium	Marcel Vandewattyne	15:14.0
5	France	Jacques Vernier	15:29.8
6	New Zealand	Harold Nelson	15:34.4
7	Netherlands	Jef Lataster	15:39.0
8	Great Britain	Jack Braughton	
9	Canada	Cliff Salmond	16:05.0
10	Trinidad and Tobago	Manny Ramjohn	
–	Denmark	Aage Poulsen	DNF
–	Ireland	John Joe Barry	DNF
–	Spain	Constantino Miranda	DNS

Heat 2

Rank	Country	Athletes	Time (hand)
1	Sweden	Erik Ahldén	14:34.2
2	Czechoslovakia	Emil Zátopek	14:34.4
2	Finland	Väinö Mäkelä	14:45.8
4	Norway	Martin Stokken	15:04.4
5	France	Maurice Pouzieux	15:09.8
6	Spain	Gregorio Rojo	15:19.0
7	Great Britain	Bill Lucas	
8	Republic of China	Lou Wen-ngau	
9	Greece	Vasilios Mavrapostolos	
10	South Korea	Sim Bok-seok	
–	Turkey	Mustafa Özcan	DNF
–	United States	Clarence Robison	DNF

Heat 3

Rank	Country	Athletes	Time (hand)
1	Netherlands	Willem Slijkhuis	15:06.8
2	Belgium	Gaston Reiff	15:07.0
2	Sweden	Bertil Albertsson	15:07.8
4	Finland	Helge Perälä	15:07.8
5	United States	Jerry Thompson	15:08.4
6	France	Alain Mimoun	15:11.2
7	Great Britain	Alec Olney	
8	Mexico	Martín Alarcón	
9	Switzerland	Ernst Günther	
–	Ireland	Martin Egan	DNS
–	Argentina	Ricardo Bralo	DNS
–	Norway	Jakob Kjersem	DNS

=== Final ===
Rank	Name	Nationality	Time (hand)	Notes
1st place, gold medalist(s)	Gaston Reiff	Belgium	14:17.6	OR
2nd place, silver medalist(s)	Emil Zátopek	Czechoslovakia	14:17.8	
3rd place, bronze medalist(s)	Willem Slijkhuis	Netherlands	14:26.8	
4	Erik Ahldén	Sweden	14:28.6	
5	Bertil Albertsson	Sweden	14:39.0	
6	Curt Stone	United States	14:39.4	
7	Väinö Koskela	Finland	14:41.0	
8	Väinö Mäkelä	Finland	14:43.0	
9	Marcel Vandewattyne	Belgium	–	
10	Martin Stokken	Norway	–	
11	Helge Perälä	Finland	–	
–	Evert Nyberg	Sweden	DNF	

Key: DNF = Did not finish, OR = Olympic record
