= 1950 European Athletics Championships – Men's 10,000 metres =

Men's 10,000 metres at the European Athletics Championships

The men's 10,000 metres at the 1950 European Athletics Championships was held in Brussels, Belgium, at Heysel Stadium on 23 August 1950.

== Medalists ==
Gold	Emil Zátopek; Czechoslovakia
Silver	Alain Mimoun; France
Bronze	Väinö Koskela; Finland

== Results ==
=== Final ===
23 August

Rank	Name	Nationality	Time	Notes
1st place, gold medalist(s)	Emil Zátopek	Czechoslovakia	29:12.0	CR
2nd place, silver medalist(s)	Alain Mimoun	France	30:21.0	
3rd place, bronze medalist(s)	Väinö Koskela	Finland	30:30.8	
4	Frank Aaron	Great Britain	30:31.6	NR
5	Nikifor Popov	Soviet Union	30:34.4	
6	Martin Stokken	Norway	30:44.8	
7	Marcel Vandewattyne	Belgium	30:48.6	
8	Osman Coşgül	Turkey	30:50.0	
9	John Doms	Belgium	31:04.2	
10	Đorđe Stefanović	Yugoslavia	31:20.0	
11	Franjo Mihalić	Yugoslavia	31:29.2	
12	Ernest Petitjean	France	32:04.4	
	Bertil Albertsson	Sweden	DNF	
	José Coll	Spain	DNF	

== Participation ==
According to an unofficial count, 14 athletes from 11 countries participated in the event.

- Belgium (2)
- Czechoslovakia (1)
- Finland (1)
- France (2)
- Norway (1)
- Soviet Union (1)
- Spain (1)
- Sweden (1)
- Turkey (1)
- Great Britain (1)
- Yugoslavia (2)
