= Väinö =

- Pronunciation: /ˈvæinø/
- Gender: Male

Origin
- Region of origin: Finland

Väinö is a masculine given name, likely a short form of Väinämöinen from Finnish myth. The name is commonly found in Finland and Estonia.

It may refer to:

- Väinö Auer (1895–1981), Finnish geologist and geographer
- Väinö Bremer (1899–1964), Finnish biathlete and modern pentathlete and Olympic competitor
- Väinö Broman (born 1932), Finnish sports shooter
- Väinö Eskola (1894–1952), Finnish sprinter
- Väinö Hakkila (1882–1958), Finnish politician
- Väinö Heikkilä (1888–1943), Finnish track and field athlete
- Väinö Heusala (1914–1982), Finnish sports shooter
- Väinö Huhtala (1935–2016), Finnish cross-country skier and Olympic medalist
- Väinö Hupli (1886–1934), Finnish journalist and politician
- Väinö Ikonen (1895–1954), Finnish wrestler and Olympic medalist
- Väinö E. Jokinen (1879–1920), Finnish journalist and politician
- Väinö Kajander (1893–1978) Finnish wrestler and Olympic medalist
- Väinö Kallio (1897–1938), Finnish politician
- Väinö Kivisalo (1882–1953), Finnish politician
- Väinö Kohtanen (1889–1963), Finnish evangelist, President of the Seventh-day Adventist Church in Finland
- Väinö Kokkinen (1899–1967), Finnish wrestler and Olympic medalist
- Väinö Korhonen (1926–2018), Finnish modern pentathlete and fencer and Olympic medalist
- Väinö Koskela (1921–2016), Finnish former long-distance runner and Olympic competitor
- Väinö Kirstinä (1936–2007), Finnish writer
- Väinö Kivilinna (1875–1950), Finnish politician
- Väinö Kuisma (1934–2015) Finnish javelin thrower
- Väinö Kunnas (1896–1929), Finnish Expressionist painter
- Väinö Lassila (1896–1939), Finnish professor and human rights activist
- Väinö Lehmus (1886–1936), Finnish actor
- Väinö Leskinen (1917–1972), Finnish politician, parliamentarian
- Väinö Liikkanen (1903–1957), Finnish cross-country skier and Olympic medalist
- Väinö Linna (1920–1992), Finnish author
- Väinö Mäkelä (1921–1982), Finnish long-distance runner and Olympic competitor
- Väinö Malmivaara (1879–1958), Finnish Lutheran Bishop and politician
- Väinö Markkanen (1929–2022), Finnish sports shooter and Olympic medalist
- Väinö Meltti (1898–1964), Finnish politician
- Väinö Merivirta (1892–1937), Finnish politician
- Väinö Myllyrinne (1909–1963), Finnish acromegalic giant and one time world's tallest person
- Väinö Muinonen (1898–1978), Finnish long-distance runner and Olympic competitor
- Väinö Nyström (1857–1918), Finnish politician
- Väinö Pastell (1881–1949), Finnish politician
- Väinö Penttala (1897–1976), Finnish wrestler and Olympic medalist
- Väinö Rainio (1896–1979), Finnish track and field athlete
- Väinö Raitio (1891–1945), Finnish composer
- Väinö Rankila (1911–1970), Finnish politician
- Väinö Salovaara (1888–1964), Finnish chief engineer and politician
- Väinö Siikaniemi (1887–1932), Finnish athlete, javelin thrower and Olympic medalist
- Väinö Sipilä (1897–1987), Finnish long-distance runner
- Väinö Skarp (1908–1981), Finnish sports shooter
- Väinö Suvivuo (1917–1985), Finnish hurdler
- Väinö Tanner (1881–1966), Finnish politician, Prime Minister of Finland
- Väinö Tanner (1881–1948), Finnish geographer and diplomat
- Väinö Tiiri (1886–1966), Finnish gymnast and Olympic medalist
- Väinö Valve (1895—1995), Finnish general and navy commander
- Väinö Vehkonen (born 2001), Finnish footballer
- Väinö Voionmaa (1869–1947), Finnish professor, politician, parliamentarian and chancellor
