= Athletics at the 1952 Summer Olympics – Men's 10,000 metres =

Men's 10,000 metres at the Games of the XV Olympiad
- Venue: Olympic Stadium
- Dates: July 20, 1952 (final)
- Competitors: 33 from 21 nations
- Winning time: 29:17.0 OR

Medalists
1st place, gold medalist(s)		Emil Zátopek; Czechoslovakia
2nd place, silver medalist(s)		Alain Mimoun; France
3rd place, bronze medalist(s)		Aleksandr Anufriyev; Soviet Union

Official Video Highlights

The men's 10,000 metres event at the 1952 Olympic Games took place July 20. The final was won by Emil Zátopek of Czechoslovakia. The winning margin was 15.8 seconds.

== Results ==
=== Final ===
Rank	Name	Nationality	Time (hand)	Notes
1st place, gold medalist(s)	Emil Zátopek	Czechoslovakia	29:17.0	OR
2nd place, silver medalist(s)	Alain Mimoun	France	29:32.8	
3rd place, bronze medalist(s)	Aleksandr Anufriyev	Soviet Union	29:48.2	
4	Hannu Posti	Finland	29:51.4	
5	Frank Sando	Great Britain	29:51.8	
6	Valter Nyström	Sweden	29:54.8	
7	Gordon Pirie	Great Britain	30:04.2	
8	Fred Norris	Great Britain	30:09.8	
9	Ivan Pozhidayev	Soviet Union	30:13.4	
10	Martin Stokken	Norway	30:22.2	
11	Nikifor Popov	Soviet Union	30:24.2	
12	Bertil Albertsson	Sweden	30:34.6	
13	Bertil Karlsson	Sweden	30:35.8	
14	Béla Juhász	Hungary	30:39.6	
15	Osman Coşgül	Turkey	30:42.4	
16	Väinö Koskela	Finland	30:43.0	
17	Ould Lamine Abdallah	France	30:53.0	
18	Franjo Mihalić	Yugoslavia	30:53.2	
19	Hugo Niskanen	Finland	30:59.6	
20	Curt Stone	United States	31:02.6	
21	Fred Wilt	United States	31:04.0	
22	Marcel Vandewattyne	Belgium	31:15.8	
23	Raúl Inostroza	Chile	31:28.6	
24	Thyge Thøgersen	Denmark	31:47.8	
25	Ahmed Ben Labidi	France	31:52.2	
26	Kristján Jóhannsson	Iceland	32:00.0	
27	Helmuth Perz	Austria	32:13.2	
28	Bill Keith	South Africa	32:32.4	
29	Alphonse Vandenrydt	Belgium	33:13.4	
30	Abdul Rashid	Pakistan	33:50.4	
31	Luis Velásquez	Guatemala	35:34.0	
32	Trần Văn Lý	Vietnam	37:33.0	
	Les Perry	Australia	DNF	
	Rikard Greenfort	Denmark	DNS	
	Antonio Amorós	Spain	DNS	
	José Coll	Spain	DNS	
	Jan Szwargot	Poland	DNS	
	Milan Švajgr	Czechoslovakia	DNS	
	Domeniko Cetinić	Yugoslavia	DNS	
	Delfo Cabrera	Argentina	DNS	
	Corsino Fernández	Argentina	DNS	
	Reinaldo Gorno	Argentina	DNS	
	Herbert Schade	Germany	DNS	
	Vasilis Mavrapostolos	Greece	DNS	
	Doroteo Flores	Guatemala	DNS	
	József Kovács	Hungary	DNS	
	Osamu Inoue	Japan	DNS	
	Paul Frieden	Luxembourg	DNS	
	Syd Luyt	South Africa	DNS	
	Hans Frischknecht	Switzerland	DNS	
	Horace Ashenfelter	United States	DNS	
