= Masters M45 5000 metres world record progression =

This is the progression of world record improvements of the 5000 metres M45 division of Masters athletics.

Key

Incomplete information Pending

Hand	Auto	Athlete	Nationality	Birthdate	Age	Location	Date	Ref
	14:21.77	Said Boudalia	Italy	4 July 1968	45 years, 87 days	Rieti	29 September 2013	
14:23.6 h		Lucien Rault	France	30 March 1936	46 years, 81 days	Vannes	19 June 1982	
14:56.4 h		Alain Mimoun	France	1 January 1921	45 years, 148 days	Paris	29 May 1966	
