= Jacques Vernier =

Jacques Vernier may refer to:

- Jacques Vernier (athlete) (1923–2015), French long-distance runner
- Jacques Vernier (politician) (born 1944), French politician
