= Erik Ahldén =

Swedish runner

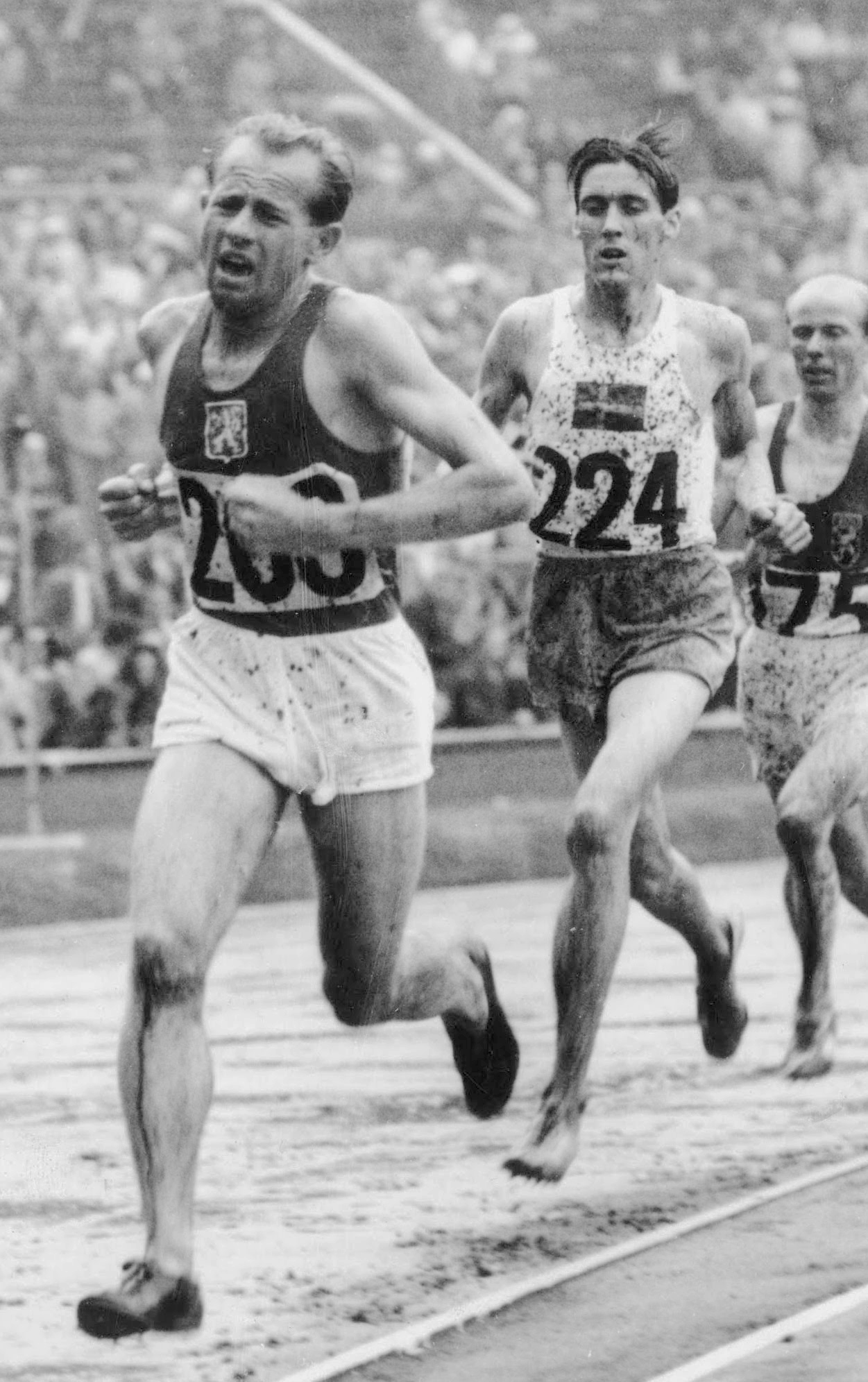
- Ahldén behind Emil Zátopek at the 1948 Olympics

Personal information
- Born: 4 September 1923 Ramsjö, Sweden
- Died: 6 July 2013 (aged 89) Nacka, Sweden
- Height: 182 cm (6 ft 0 in)
- Weight: 67 kg (148 lb)

Sport
- Sport: Athletics
- Event: 1500–5000 m
- Club: Bellevue IK; MAI; IFK Växjö

Achievements and titles
- Personal bests: 1500 m – 3:48.2 (1945); Mile – 4:09.4 (1946); 3,000 m – 8:09.6 (1948); 5,000 – 14:13.2 (1948)

Erik Torsten Ahldén (4 September 1923 – 6 July 2013) was a Swedish runner. In 1948 he ranked second in the world over 3000–5000 m distances and placed fourth in the 5000 m event at the 1948 Olympics. He won national titles in the 5000 m in 1948 and in the cross country in 1946. After retiring from competitions he was a board member of the Swedish Athletics Association.
