= Steve McCooke (athlete) =

British long-distance runner

Personal information
- Nationality: British (Northern Irish)
- Born: 4 September 1918 Armoy, Northern Ireland
- Died: 16 March 2007 (aged 88) Broughshane, Northern Ireland

Sport
- Sport: middle/long-distance running
- Event: 10,000 metres
- Club: East Antrim Harriers

Stephen Hunter McCooke (4 September 1918 – 16 March 2007) was a British and Northern Irish long-distance runner who competed at the 1948 Summer Olympics.

== Biography ==
McCooke cycled 75 miles, twice a week to train with his club the East Antrim Harriers. McCooke finished third behind Sydney Wooderson in the 3 miles event at the 1946 AAA Championships.

Two years later McCooke finished third behind Stan Cox in the 6 miles event at the 1948 AAA Championships. Shortly afterwards McCooke represented the Great Britain team at the 1948 Olympic Games in London in the men's 10,000 metres event.

He was inducted into Newtown Abbey Councils' Sporting Hall of Fame in 2002.
