= Masters M40 10000 metres world record progression =

This is the progression of world record improvements of the 10000 metres M40 division of Masters athletics.

Key

Incomplete information Pending

Hand	Auto	Athlete	Nationality	Birthdate	Location	Date
	27:49.35	Bernard Lagat	United States	12 December 1974	Stanford	1 May 2016
	28:30.88	Martti Vainio	Finland	30 December 1950	Hengelo	25 June 1991
28:33.4		Lucien Rault	France	30 March 1936	Rennes	9 June 1976
28:33.4		Lucien Rault	France	30 March 1936	Villeneuve d'Ascq	25 June 1976
28:45.4		Mamo Wolde	Ethiopia	12 June 1932	Munich	31 August 1972
29:57.4		Alain Mimoun	France	1 January 1921	Cambrai	1 August 1964
30:14.2		Nikifor Popov	Soviet Union	2 June 1911		1955
30:24.2		Nikifor Popov	Soviet Union	2 June 1911	Helsinki	20 July 1952
