= Abdullah Said =

Abdullah Said may refer to:

- Abdallah El Said (born 1985), Egyptian footballer
- Abdullah Said al Libi (died 2009), alleged al Qaeda leader, killed in a missile strike from an unmanned drone
- Ben Saïd Abdallah (born 1924), French Olympic athlete
