= Jack Braughton =

British long-distance runner

Personal information
- Nationality: British
- Born: 22 February 1921 Grimsby, England
- Died: 30 October 2016 (aged 95)

Sport
- Sport: Long-distance running

Jack Braughton (22 February 1921 – 30 October 2016) was a British long-distance runner who competed in the 1948 Summer Olympics. He was born in Grimsby.

== Biography ==
Braughton was born in February 1921 in Grimsby and attended Grimsby Technical College. He ran for Cleethorpes Harriers and Grimsby Harriers, winning the Eastern-Counties Junior Cross-Country title in 1939. Braughton was in the army in India, where he continued running, with the aim of competing at the Olympics. He joined the Blackheath Harriers, and later won multiple titles in Surrey in the three-mile event.

Braughton worked on a building site, and needed permission to take time off from work to compete at the 1948 Summer Olympics in London. He had to do so in his own time, and was not paid to take time off from work. Braughton raced in the men's 5000 metres, finishing in eighth place in his heat. As an amateur, he lost half a day's pay, and made his own way to Wembley Stadium using public transport. Once at the stadium, he changed into his running gear, competed in the heat, and went home.

After the Olympics, Braughton carried on with running. In 1955, he finished in sixth place in his first ever marathon. He continued to take part in running until he was 80 years old. At the age of 90, he also did ballroom dancing four days a week.
