= Evert Heinström =

Finnish long-distance runner

Personal information
- Full name: Valdemar Evert Heinström
- Nationality: Finnish
- Born: 27 September 1912
- Died: 22 October 2009 (aged 97)

Sport
- Sport: Long-distance running
- Event: 10,000 metres

Valdemar Evert Heinström (27 September 1912 – 22 October 2009) was a Finnish long-distance runner. He competed in the men's 10,000 metres at the 1948 Summer Olympics.
