= Nikifor Popov =

Soviet long-distance runner

Nikifor Popov (2 June 1911 – 19 June 1983) was a Russian long-distance runner who competed for the Soviet Union in the 1952 Summer Olympics in the 5,000 metres and 10,000 metres as a 40 year old, in the process or qualifying for the Olympics setting the Masters M40 World record in the 5,000 metres and 10,000 metres. His record in the 5,000 lasted just over 20 years before it was surpassed by French Olympian Michel Bernard. He is reported to have improved upon his own record in the 10,000 three years later. His 10,000 record was beaten 12 years after the initial setting by another French Olympian, 1956 Marathon gold medalist Alain Mimoun. He was born in Khabarovsk.
