= Martín Alarcón (athlete) =

Mexican athlete

Martín E. Alarcón Hisojo
Personal information
- Born: 30 January 1928 Metepec, Mexico
- Died: 7 May 1991 (aged 63)

Sport
- Sport: Long-distance running
- Event: 5000 metres

Martín E. Alarcón Hisojo (30 January 1928 – 7 May 1991) was a Mexican long-distance runner. He competed in the men's 5000 metres at the 1948 Summer Olympics.

In 2015, he posthumously received a Sports Merit Award, and in Metepec, State of Mexico, a sports facility is named after him.
