= Masters M40 5000 metres world record progression =

This is the progression of world record improvements of the 5000 metres M40 division of Masters athletics.

Key

Incomplete information Pending

Hand	Auto	Athlete	Nationality	Birthdate	Age	Location	Date	Ref
	13:06.78	Bernard Lagat	United States	12 December 1974	41 years, 252 days	Rio de Janeiro	20 August 2016	
	13:14.97	Bernard Lagat	United States	12 December 1974	40 years, 168 days	Eugene	29 May 2015	
	13:43.15	Mohamed Ezzher	France	26 April 1960	40 years, 68 days	Sotteville	3 July 2000	
13:45.6 h		Lucien Rault	France	30 March 1936	40 years, 52 days	Rennes	21 May 1976	
14:07.0 h		Jack Foster	New Zealand	23 May 1932	42 years, 254 days	Hamilton	1 February 1975	
14:10.2 h		Michel Bernard	France	31 December 1931		Paris	July 1972	
14:16.0 h		Nikifor Popov	Soviet Union	2 June 1911	41 years, 28 days	Kiev	30 June 1952	
