= Ernst Günther (athlete) =

Swiss long-distance runner (born 1914)

Personal information
- Nationality: Swiss
- Born: 1914

Sport
- Sport: Long-distance running
- Event: 5000 metres

Ernst Günther (born 1914, date of death unknown) was a Swiss long-distance runner. He competed in the men's 5000 metres at the 1948 Summer Olympics.
