= 1946 European Athletics Championships – Men's 10,000 metres =

Men's 10,000 metres at the European Athletics Championships

The men's 10,000 metres at the 1946 European Athletics Championships was held in Oslo, Norway, at Bislett Stadium on 22 August 1946.

== Medalists ==
Gold	Viljo Heino; Finland
Silver	Helge Perälä; Finland
Bronze	András Csaplár; Hungary

== Results ==
=== Final ===
22 August

Rank	Name	Nationality	Time	Notes
1st place, gold medalist(s)	Viljo Heino	Finland	29:52.0	CR
2nd place, silver medalist(s)	Helge Perälä	Finland	30:31.4	
3rd place, bronze medalist(s)	András Csaplár	Hungary	30:35.2	
4	Sven Rapp	Sweden	30:49.2	
5	Feodosiy Vanin	Soviet Union	30:56.2	
6	Charles Heirendt	Luxembourg	31:08.2	
7	Thorvald Wilhelmsen	Norway	31:20.8	
8	Martin Stokken	Norway	32:56.0	
	Thore Tillman	Sweden	DNF	
	Giuseppe Beviacqua	Italy	DNF	

== Participation ==
According to an unofficial count, 10 athletes from 7 countries participated in the event.

- Finland (2)
- Hungary (1)
- Italy (1)
- Luxembourg (1)
- Norway (2)
- Soviet Union (1)
- Sweden (2)
