= Evert Nyberg =

Swedish long-distance runner

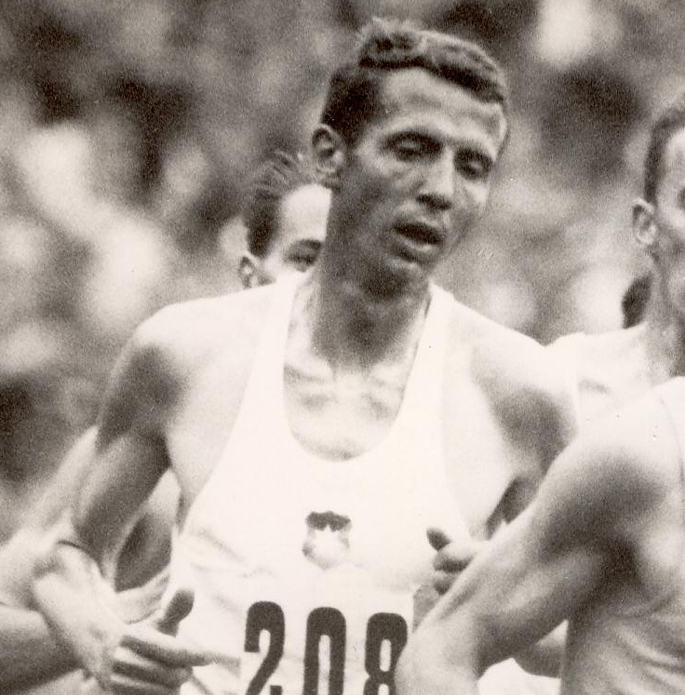
- Nyberg in 1956

Personal information
- Born: 28 February 1925 Gothenburg, Sweden
- Died: 17 August 2000 (aged 75) Gothenburg, Sweden
- Height: 184 cm (6 ft 0 in)
- Weight: 67 kg (148 lb)

Sport
- Sport: Athletics
- Event: 5000 m – marathon
- Club: Örgryte IS

Achievements and titles
- Personal bests: 5000 m – 14:23.2 (1946); 10000 m – 29:33.4 (1955); Marathon – 2:25:08 (1957)
Medal record
Men's athletics
Representing Sweden
European Championships
Bronze medal – third place	1946 Oslo	5000 m

John Evert Nyberg (28 February 1925 – 17 August 2000) was a Swedish long-distance runner who won a bronze medal in the 5000 m event at the 1946 European Championships.

Nyberg was born on 28 February 1925 in Gothenburg.

He competed in the 5000 m at the 1948 Summer Olympics and in the marathon at the 1956 and 1960 Summer Olympics with the best result of eighth place in 1956. He won the Košice Peace Marathon in 1955.

Nyberg won national titles in the 5000 m (1946 and 1956), 10000 m (1955), 25000 m (1955–57 and 1960), 30000 m (1961 and 1962), marathon (1955, 1957, 1962 and 1963) and cross country (1950, 1955 and 1957).
