= Jean-Marie Borzeix =

French journalist (1941–2024)

Director of France Culture
- In office 1984–1997
- Preceded by: Yves Jaigu
- Succeeded by: Patrice Gélinet

Personal details
- Born: 1 August 1941 Bugeat, France
- Died: 16 March 2024 (aged 82)
- Education: Sciences Po; Faculté des lettres de Paris
- Occupation: Journalist

Jean-Marie Borzeix (1 August 1941 – 16 March 2024) was a French journalist.

== Biography ==
Born in Bugeat on 1 August 1941, Borzeix studied at the Faculté des lettres de Paris and the Sciences Po and became a teacher in Algeria. He then turned to journalism, working for Combat from 1968 to 1973 and Le Quotidien de Paris from 1974 to 1975. He then approached cultural and literary issues, becoming editor-in-chief of Les Nouvelles littéraires and subsequently literary director at Éditions du Seuil from 1979 to 1984. He was then named director of France Culture, serving in this role from 1984 to 1997. After his departure, Minister of Culture Catherine Trautmann tasked him with writing a report on library lending rights.

From 1999 to 2000, Borzeix served as CEO of Télérama before holding various positions at the Bibliothèque nationale de France. He also served on the Haut Conseil de la francophonie from 1985 to 2002 and became president of the Festival international des francophonies en Limousin in 2002.

Jean-Marie Borzeix died on 16 March 2024, at the age of 82.

== Publications ==
- Mitterrand lui-même (1973)
- Au nom du peuple français... (1974)
- Les entreprises et la gauche (1975)
- Les carnets d'un francophone (2006)
- Jeudi Saint (2008)
  - Translation: One Day in France: Tragedy and Betrayal in an Occupied Village (translated by Gay McAuley, 2016)
- Une enfance dans la guerre : Algérie 1954-1962 (2016)
- L'homme qui aimait les arbres (2018)

== Decorations ==
- Knight of the Legion of Honour (2010)
