= Maurice Pouzieux =

French long-distance runner

Personal information
- Nationality: French
- Born: 31 August 1920
- Died: 5 February 1980 (aged 59)

Sport
- Sport: Long-distance running
- Event: 5000 metres

Maurice Pouzieux (31 August 1920 – 5 February 1980) was a French long-distance runner. He competed in the men's 5000 metres at the 1948 Summer Olympics.
