= Trần Văn Lý =

Vietnamese long-distance runner

Personal information
- Nationality: Vietnamese
- Born: 20 February 1927

Sport
- Sport: Long-distance running
- Event: 10,000 metres

Trần Văn Lý (born 20 February 1927) was a Vietnamese long-distance runner. He competed in the men's 10,000 metres at the 1952 Summer Olympics.
