= André Paris =

French long-distance runner

Personal information
- Nationality: French
- Born: 6 August 1925
- Died: 27 March 2016 (aged 90)

Sport
- Sport: Long-distance running
- Event: 10,000 metres

André Paris (6 August 1925 – 27 March 2016) was a French long-distance runner. He competed in the men's 10,000 metres at the 1948 Summer Olympics.
