= Paddy Fahey (athlete) =

Irish long-distance runner

Personal information
- Full name: Patrick Fahey
- Nationality: Irish
- Born: 25 August 1923 Bealacune
- Died: 26 February 2008 (aged 84) Graigue

Sport
- Sport: Long-distance running
- Event: 10,000 metres

Patrick Fahey (25 August 1923 – 26 February 2008) was an Irish long-distance runner. He competed in the men's 10,000 metres at the 1948 Summer Olympics.
