= Bugeat =

- Commune
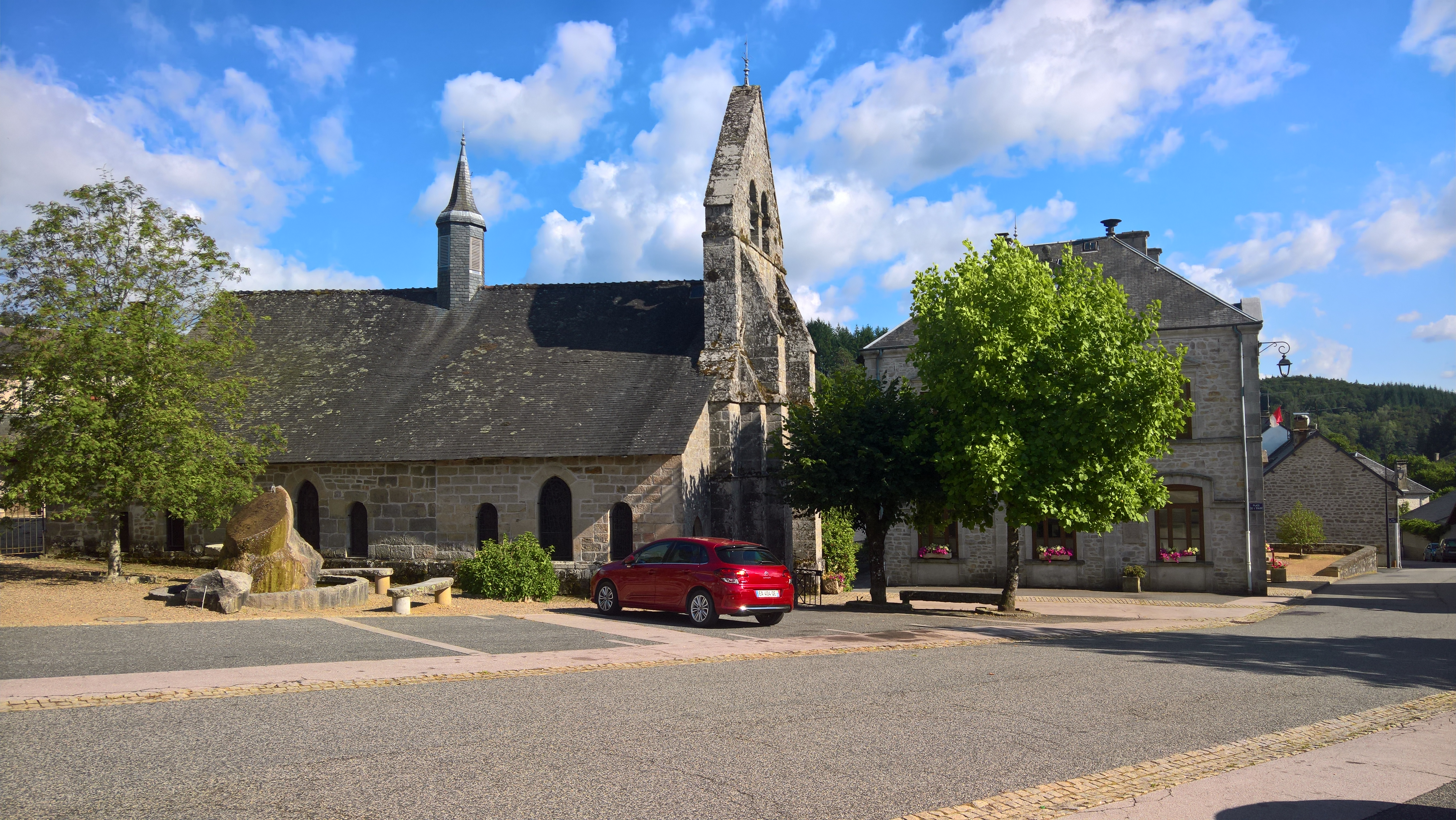
- Saint-Pardoux church in Bugeat

- Coat of arms
- Location of Bugeat
- Location within France Location within Nouvelle-Aquitaine
- Coordinates: 45°35′56″N 1°55′41″E
- Country: France
- Region: Nouvelle-Aquitaine
- Department: Corrèze
- Arrondissement: Ussel
- Canton: Plateau de Millevaches
- Intercommunality: CC Vézère-Monédières-Millesources

Government
  - Mayor (2026–32): Jean-Yves Urbain
- Area^{1}: 30.99 km^{2} (11.97 sq mi)
- Highest elevation: 844 m (2,769 ft)
- Lowest elevation: 667 m (2,188 ft)
- Population (2023): 719
  - Density: 23.2/km^{2} (60.1/sq mi)
- Time zone: UTC+01:00 (CET)
  - Summer (DST): UTC+02:00 (CEST)
- INSEE/Postal code: 19033 /19170
- ^{1} French Land Register data, which excludes lakes, ponds, glaciers > 1 km^{2} (0.386 sq mi or 247 acres) and river estuaries.

Bugeat (French pronunciation: [byʒa]; Occitan: Bujac) is a commune in the Corrèze department in central France in the Nouvelle-Aquitaine region. Its inhabitants are called les Bugeacois and les Bugeacoises.

== History ==
=== Antiquity ===
Before the conquest of Gaul by the Romans, the human presence at Bugeat was signified by mounds, called tumuli, such as the mound erected in the wood of Chaleix. These tumuli are burial sites, most often linked to the Gallic civilisation of La Tène (period 450 to 50 BC). These burials are frequently located on summits, and have a circular shape of several metres in diameter and 1 metre in height. In the 1st century AD, the Gallo-Roman civilisation developed, whose presence at Bugeat is manifested through the Gallo-Roman villa known as the Champ du palais. This construction, that of a farm, left vestiges near the Pont des Rochers, on the Bugeat-Égletons road. Foundation walls, a column fragment, ceramics, and coins were found at this location.

=== Middle Ages ===
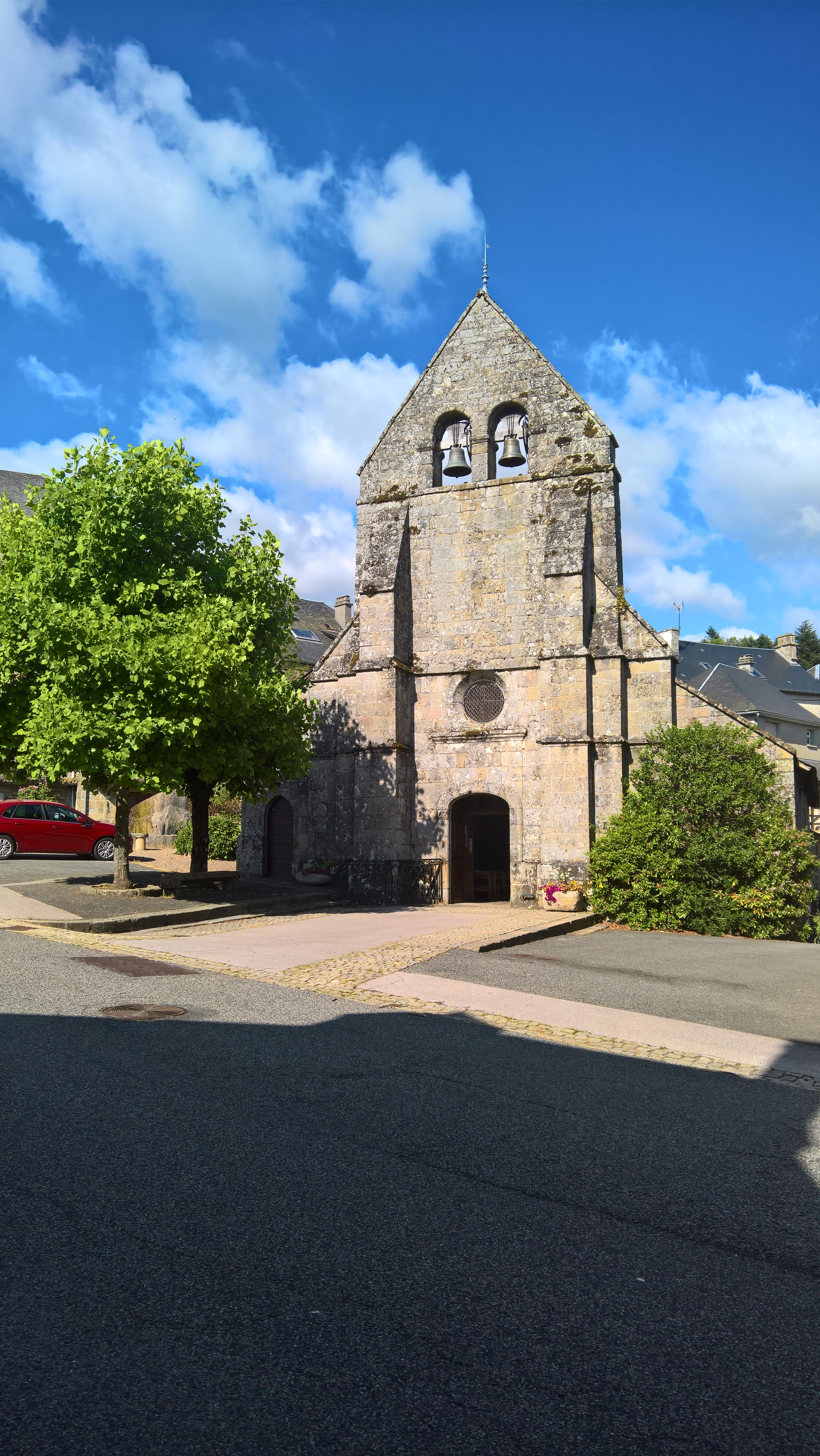
Parish Church

Among the monuments dating from the Middle Ages in Bugeat was the church of the parish, a parish under the patronage of Saint-Doux. A church existed in the 12th century, in Romanesque style, in the form of a cross. This Romanesque church no longer exists and all that remains from that time is a Romanesque baptismal vessel, adorned with curved arches, surmounted by a row of small circles. This ancient church was replaced, between the 14th and 15th century's, by the present church, in Gothic style. The building has on its entrance facade, a steeple-wall and inside, several bays with bossed keystones vaults with sculptures of a crown, a rose and a rhombus.

=== 1789 to 1914 ===
In the last quarter of 19th century, Bugeat experienced an important event, the arrival of the railway. On 8 October 1883, the section from Eymoutiers-Meymac, belonging to the Limoges-Ussel railway line, was inaugurated. The station at Bugeat resulted in the appearance of the town on the railway maps.

=== The Great War (1914-1918) ===
The First World War, as was the case for all the French communes, affected the history of the commune of Bugeat in a profound and lasting way. The human balance of the conflict is terrible: 74 soldiers from the commune of Bugeat died, and in Bugeat in 1919, 60 disabled men were recorded. The effect of the conflict on the demography is notable: between 1911 and 1921, the population of Bugeat declined by 5 per cent, while the population of the canton of Bugeat declined by more than 18 per cent (war, but also the rural exodus, which began before 1914, explains this setback).

The vast majority of Bugeat's soldiers were enrolled in Infantry Regiments (RI), such as the 100th RI, the 126th RI, the 300th RI. These regiments belong to the 24th Infantry Division, which was part of the 12th Corps, which was the Army Corps of the military region based in Limoges from the departments of the Charente, the Corrèze, the Dordogne and the Haute-Vienne.

Many of the 74 soldiers who died during this period were the victims of the battles in the Marne, as well as the battles of the l'Aisne and the battles of the Somme. Other soldiers were killed outside of France, such as the soldier engaged on the Eastern front, in Serbia, Marius Jean-Baptiste Manigne, who died on 11 March 1917 in Leskovets (the village of Leskoets – current spelling – is today in Macedonia).

=== The Inter-war period (1918-1939) ===
In 1923, the supply of running water was carried out in the village of Bugeat. At that time, the connection to "running water" was made for some individuals in the village. Up until the installation, hydrants were judiciously placed to serve the different districts of the town.

=== Second World War (1939-1945) ===
On 6 April 1944, a German army company departing to the Normandy front shot four Jews in Tarnac, and four inhabitants of the village were shot by German soldiers to terrorise the people who protected resistance fighters from Êchameil.

On 29 April 1944, three resistance fighters were tortured and then shot in Vergne by German soldiers for refusing to reveal where their camp was located.

On 5 May 1944, the German Army unit attacked the groupe Lalet based in the abandoned village of Bordes de Bonnefond, which they burned. Among the resistance fighters, two were killed in battle — Lucien Niarfeix and Charles Terracol — three were deported to Dachau, René Dumas, who had been wounded during the attack, Louis Brousse and Roger Lavieille, the latter not returning from death camp.

On 14 July 1944, during a clash with the brigade Jesser, three resistance fighters (Henri Cayet, Pierre Orluc, Auguste Stein) of the 238^{e} compagnie FTPF died in Marcy and six members were deported. Before leaving, the Nazis set fire to the village.

On the night of 11 August 1944, the French soldiers of the 3rd SAS Parachute Regiment arrived at Fonfreyde to fight against the German Army, alongside their comrades from the Maquis.

==== Deported from Gourdon-Murat ====
A stele was erected in memory of three resistance members deported from the commune of Gourdon-Murat. One was arrested in Paris by the Special brigades of Pétain and deported to Ravensbrück, another was deported to Buchenwald in the same circumstances, and one who was to be hanged, finally deported to Dachau.

=== End of 1940s to the present day ===
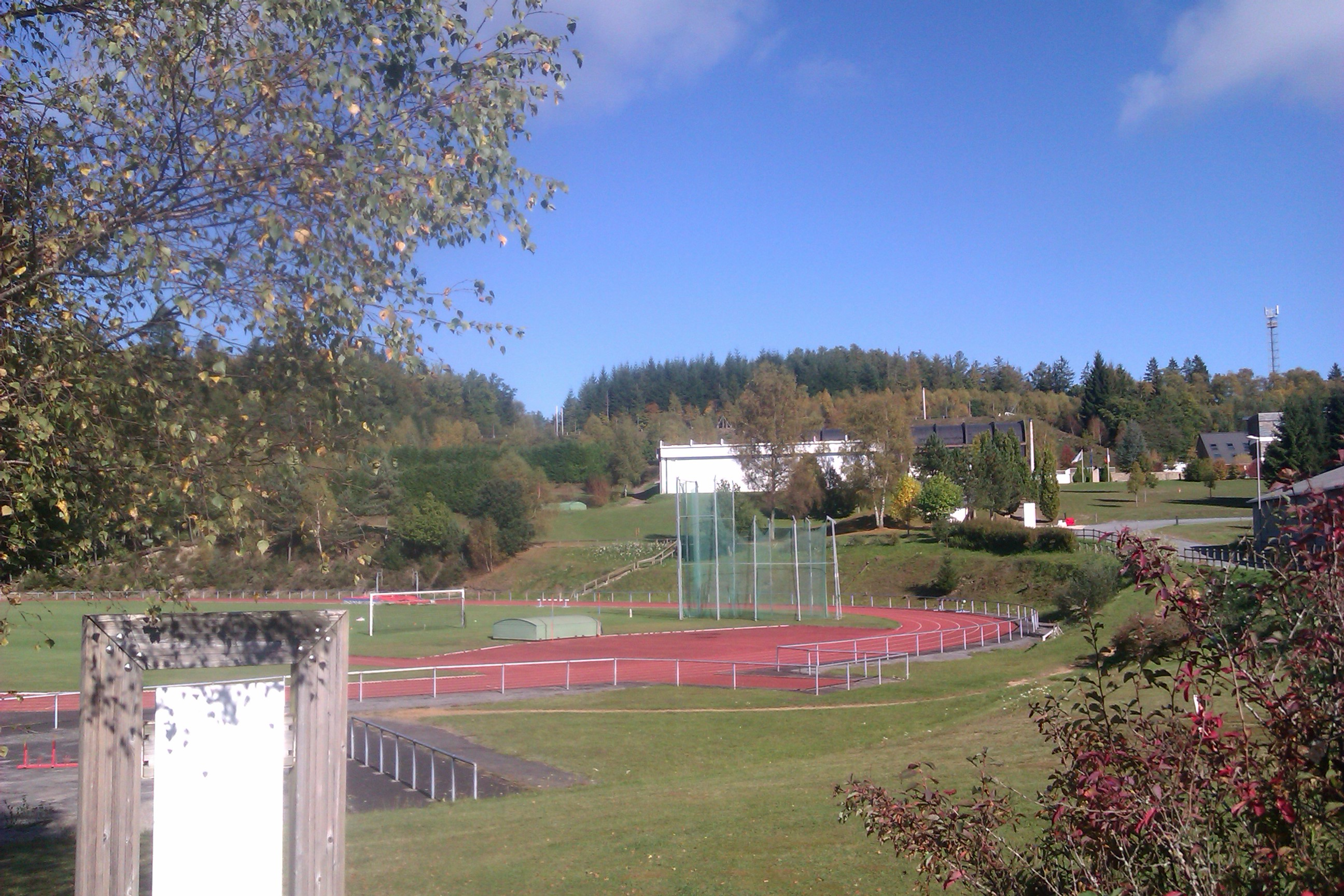
Sports centre

Initiatives were taken by leaders, at various levels, and from various backgrounds, to try to develop the commune economically. As tourism appears to be one of the only opportunities for the development of Bugeat, the initiatives undertaken are aimed at the different types of tourism: family Tourism (example: "Secondary residence"), social tourism, sports tourism (see below), outdoor tourism (example: hiking). A great success was made in the area of sports tourism. This involved the setting up of a National Training Centre at Bugeat. Following Alain Mimoun's victory at the Melbourne Marathon in 1956, he worked to set up a training centre in Bugeat, where he and his wife owned a second home and where he had prepared for the 1956 Melbourne Olympics. From 1967, municipal, departmental, regional and national policymakers made decisions leading to the construction of a gymnasium, near the Ganette Stadium, then constructing accommodation for athletes. This is how the national training centre of Bugeat developed, now known as the Espace Mille Sources.

== Geography ==
Commune located in the Massif Central and the parc naturel régional de Millevaches en Limousin. It is watered by the river Vézère and two of its tributaries, the Ars and the Ruisseau des Rochers. The village itself sits at an altitude of 700m.

=== Population ===
Historical population
Year	Pop.	±% p.a.
1968	1,100	—
1975	1,108	+0.10%
1982	1,055	−0.70%
1990	1,063	+0.09%
1999	996	−0.72%
2007	926	−0.91%
2012	860	−1.47%
2017	803	−1.36%
2023	719	−1.82%
Source: INSEE

== Local culture and heritage ==
=== Places and monuments ===
- Église Saint-Pardoux de Bugeat - The choir, the crossing and the transept, date from the 12th-century, were classified as historical monuments in 1917. It has a five-sided chancel. It dates from the 12th and the 15th-centuries. The church has a two-tiered bell gable.
- The town of Bugeat is known to French athletes for its National Sports Training Centre, which has become the " Espace 1000 Sources Alain-Mimoun ", which was founded by Alain Mimoun, French long-distance running champion and Olympic marathon champion in 1956. This centre regularly serves as a setting for the preparation of international matches for athletes from many disciplines (rugby, athletics, boxing, table tennis, etc.).
- Gallo-Roman villa in the Champ du Palais

=== Personalities linked to the commune ===
- Charles Bichet - painter, professor at the Decorative Arts of Limoges, born in 1863 in Paris, and died in 1929 in Limoges; Bichet left a painted work of great originality, inspired by the landscapes of Crozant, Châteauponsac, and other places in the Limousin; he also visited Bugeat, whose sites he depicted in several of his works.
- Jean-Marie Borzeix - journalist, writer, head of cultural institutions, born in 1941 in Bugeat ; some of his works are inspired by Bugeat and its region, such as his story Jeudi saint, which recalls the dramatic events that occurred on 6 April 1944 in Bugeat.
- Georges-Emmanuel Clancier - novelist and poet, born in 1914 in Limoges; at the beginning of the 1930s, the young high school student, ill, interrupted his studies, and, convalescing, he came to taste the " good air " of Bugeat; his stays in Bugeat inspired him to write two short stories : La Roue and Tuer.
- André Larquettoux - engineer, inventor of an underwater concrete process, born in 1908 in Bugeat, and died in 2004 in Paris; he lived in Bugeat, and also in Lacelle ; he did a lot for the restoration of the citadel of Belle-Île-en-Mer, in Brittany.
- Félix Lestang - peasant and forestry trader, communist mayor of Bugeat from 1932 to 1959, general councillor from 1937 to 1961, President of the General Council of Corrèze in 1945.
- Antoine Mazaud - a farmer living in the hamlet of Mouriéras, he met on September 10, 1954, at nightfall, a helmeted being who gave him a hug without saying a word, before taking off aboard a cigar-shaped machine, the color of zinc, which moved away in the direction of Limoges. Measuring 4 to 5 meters, the craft left almost silently and passed under a high-voltage line.
- Bernard Mazaud - visual artist, born in 1923 in Paris ; he lives and works in Mouriéras, a hamlet of Bugeat; He has been exhibiting since 1972, and his pieces and installations are in public and private collections.
- Marcel Merguiller - painter, born in 1892 in Limoges, and died in 1981 in Bugeat; a pupil of Charles Bichet, he practiced painting as an amateur, and he travelled with his master through the Bugeat region, as well as other sites on the Millevaches plateau; he left drawings, as well as paintings, some of which are in the retirement home in Bugeat, where he lived his last days.
- Richard Millet - writer, born in Viam in 1953 ; In his work, Millet evokes his native country, making the region of Viam and Bugeat the setting for several of his novels : La Gloire des Pythre, L'Amour des trois sœurs Piale, Lauve le pur.
- Alain Mimoun - long-distance runner, Olympic champion, born in 1921 in Telagh, French Algeria, and died on 27 June 2013 in Saint-Mandé, in the Val-de-Marne; he trained in Bugeat in the 1950s; in the 1960s, he was at the origin of the creation of the National Sports Training Centre of Bugeat (which became the Espace 1000 Sources Alain-Mimoun).
- Xavier Patier - writer, senior civil servant, born in Brive in 1958; Patier sets the action of one of his stories, La Foire aux célibataires, in the countryside east of Bugeat, and in a hamlet that he calls "Couderc".
- Henri Troyat - writer, member of the Académie française, born in Moscow in 1911 and died in Paris in 2007; in his book Les Semailles et les Moissons, the writer, nourished by the memories of his wife and family from Bugeat, sets episodes of his novel in Bugeat, whose name he has changed, the town of his story being called La Chapelle-au-Bois.

== See also ==
- Communes of the Corrèze department
