= Salomon Könönen =

Finnish long-distance runner

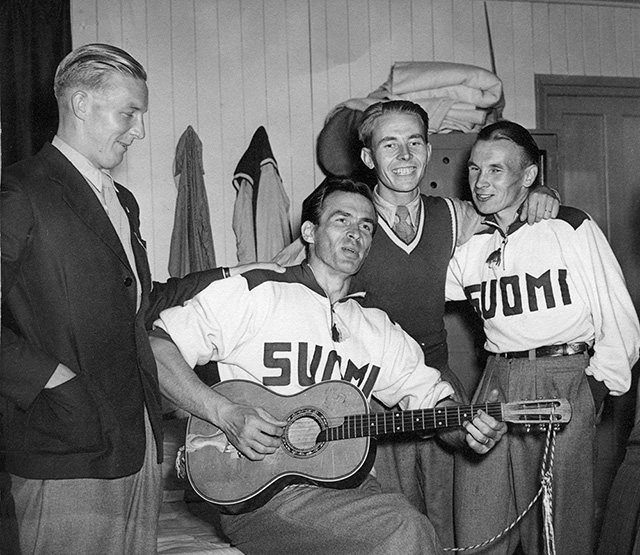
- Könönen (right) at the 1948 Olympics

Personal information
- Born: 8 June 1916 Suonenjoki, Finland
- Died: 21 February 1979 (aged 62) Kotka, Finland
- Height: 172 cm (5 ft 8 in)
- Weight: 63 kg (139 lb)

Sport
- Sport: Athletics
- Event(s): 5000 m, 10000 m, marathon
- Club: Kotkan Into

Achievements and titles
- Personal best(s): 5000 m – 14:35.6 (1947); 10000 m – 30:10.8 (1948); Marathon – 2:28:40 (1949)

Salomo "Salomon" Könönen (8 June 1916 – 21 February 1979) was a Finnish long-distance runner. He competed in the 10000 m event at the 1948 Summer Olympics and finished ninth.
