= Gaston Reiff =

Belgian runner

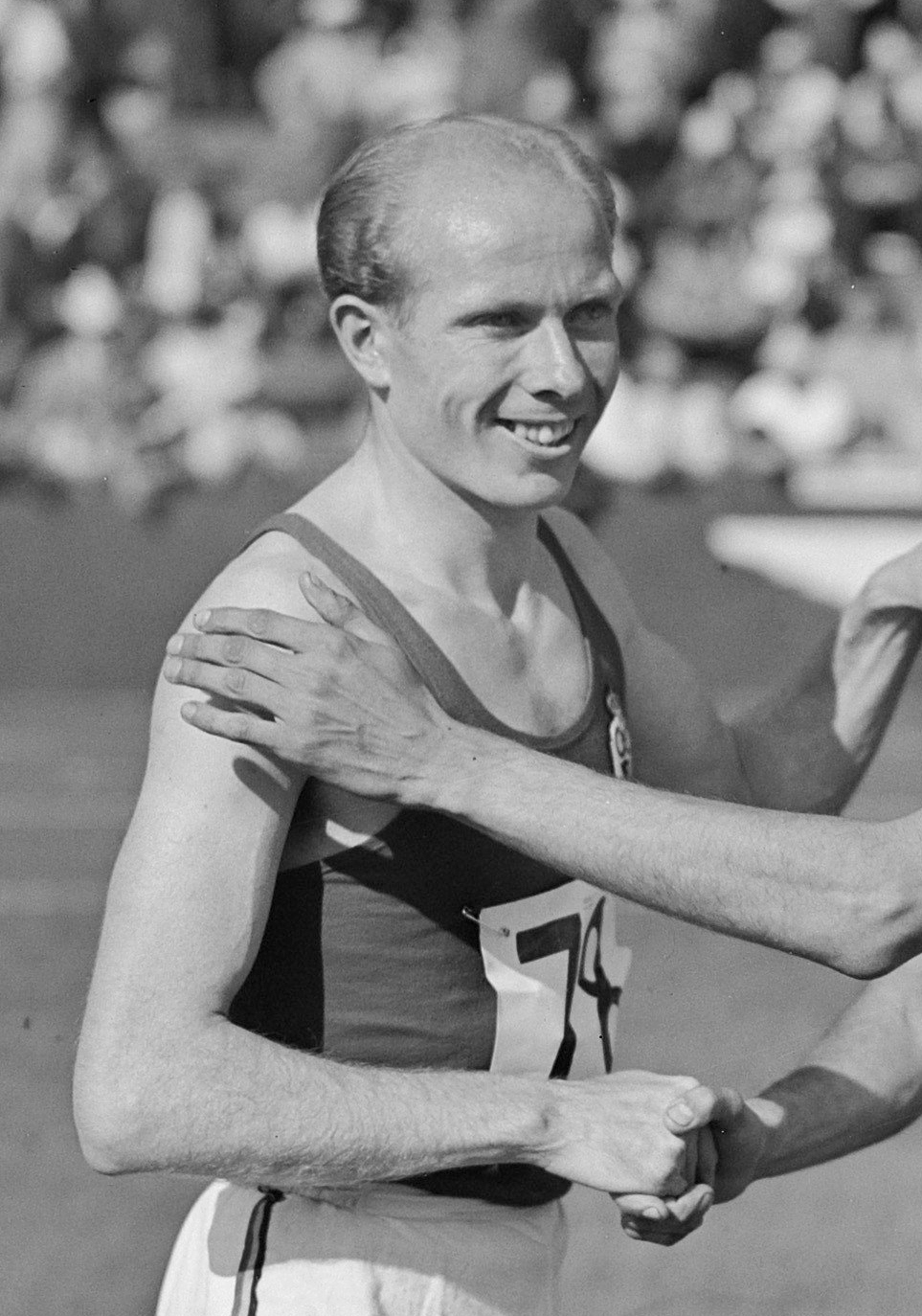
- Gaston Reiff in 1949

Personal information
- Born: 24 February 1921 Braine-l'Alleud, Belgium
- Died: 6 May 1992 (aged 71) Braine-l'Alleud, Belgium
- Height: 173 cm (5 ft 8 in)
- Weight: 61 kg (134 lb)

Sport
- Sport: Athletics
- Event: 1000–10,000 m
- Club: USG

Achievements and titles
- Personal bests: 1500 m – 3:45.2 (1952); Mile – 4:02.8 (1952); 5000 m – 14:10.8 (1951); 10,000 m – 30:18.8 (1951)
Medal record
Men's athletics
Representing Belgium
Olympic Games
| Gold medal – first place | 1948 London | 5000 m |
European Championships
| Bronze medal – third place | 1950 Brussels | 5000 m |

Gaston Étienne Ghislaine Reiff (24 February 1921 – 6 May 1992) was a Belgian runner. He competed at the 1948 and 1952 Olympics in the 5000 m event and won it in 1948, defeating Emil Zátopek in the final and becoming the first Belgian track and field athlete to win an Olympic title. He lost to Zátopek at the 1950 European Championships, placing third.

Reiff competed in boxing and football before changing to athletics. Besides his Olympic gold medal he set world records in the 2000 m, 3000 m and 2 miles and won 24 national titles; in 1951 he held Belgian records on distances ranging from 1000 m to 10000 m. A street in Braine-l'Alleud and the town's stadium are named after Reiff in his home town of Braine-l'Alleud.

Records
| Preceded by (Sweden) Gunder Hägg | Men's 3000 m World Record Holder; 12 August 1949 – 14 May 1955 | Succeeded by (Hungary) Sandor Iharos |
