= Ben Saïd Abdallah =

French long-distance runner

Personal information
- Nationality: French
- Born: 1 September 1924 Rabat, French Morocco

Sport
- Sport: Long-distance running
- Event: 10,000 metres

Ben Saïd Abdallah (born 1 September 1924) is a French long-distance runner. He competed in the men's 10,000 metres at the 1948 Summer Olympics.
