= Helge Perälä =

Finnish long-distance runner

Medal record

Men's athletics

Representing Finland

European Championships
Silver medal – second place	1946 Oslo	10,000 m

Helge Perälä (3 June 1915, Vehkalahti – 13 February 2010) was a Finnish long-distance runner who competed in the men's 5000 metres event at the 1948 Summer Olympics, finishing in the 11th place.
