= Aleksandr Anufriyev =

Soviet long-distance runner

Olympic medal record

Men's athletics

Representing Soviet Union
Bronze medal – third place	1952 Helsinki	10000 metres

Anufriyev at the 1952 Summer Olympics.

Aleksandr Aleksandrovich Anufriyev (Russian: Александр Александрович Ануфриев, May 10, 1926 – September 26, 1966) was a Soviet athlete who competed in the 1952 Summer Olympics. He was born in village Diyur, Izhemsky District, Komi ASSR. Anufriyev competed for the Soviet Union in the 1952 Summer Olympics held in Helsinki, Finland in the 10000 metres where he won the bronze medal.
