= Bertil Karlsson =

Swedish long-distance runner

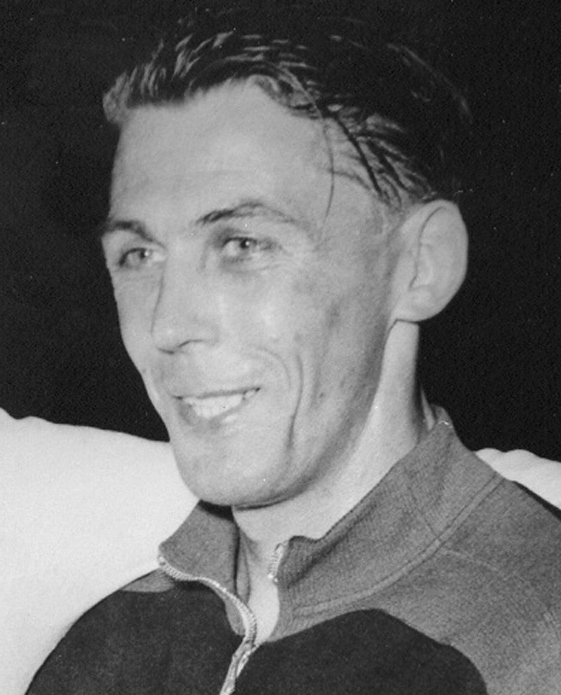

Personal information
- Born: 19 September 1919 Uppsala, Sweden
- Died: 31 December 2012 (aged 93) Uppsala, Sweden
- Height: 175 cm (5 ft 9 in)
- Weight: 63 kg (139 lb)

Sport
- Sport: Athletics
- Events: 5000 m, 10,000 m
- Club: IF Linnéa, Stockholm

Achievements and titles
- Personal bests: 5000 m – 14:31.4 (1947); 10000 m – 30:10.0 (1951).

Karl Bertil Karlsson (19 September 1919 – 31 December 2012) was a Swedish athlete who competed at the 1952 Summer Olympics in Helsinki. He finished 13th in the men's 10,000 metres event and was eliminated in the heats of the men's 5000 metres. He was the Swedish champion in the 4,000 metre cross-country in 1949, the 5000 metre distance in 1950, and the 10,000 metre distance in 1952.
