= Väinö Koskela =

Finnish long-distance runner

Medal record

Men's athletics

Representing Finland

European Championships
Bronze medal – third place	1950 Brussels	10,000m

Väinö Koskela (31 March 1921 – 10 September 2016) was a Finnish long-distance runner. Originally a cross-country skier, he was inspired to take up track and field athletics by Finnish victories in the long-distance running events at the 1936 Summer Olympics. He began competing in 1945, following service in World War II, and made his first international appearance at the 1948 Summer Olympics, where he placed seventh in the men's 5000 metres event. The same year he was a national champion in both the 5000 metres and cross-country running and retained the former title through 1949. In 1950 he took home a bronze medal in the 10,000 metres at that year's European Athletics Championships and continued to participate through the 1952 Summer Olympics, after which he retired from active competition and resumed a life of farming.

== Early life ==
Koskela was born in Virolahti on 31 March 1921. He began his athletic career in the field of cross-country skiing, in which he won a national under-18 event in 1938. Inspired by the Finnish success in long-distance running at the 1936 Summer Olympics, however, he decided to pursue athletics as his sport of choice. His career was interrupted by World War II, during which time he served for his native Finland in the Gulf of Finland and around the Svir River. As a result, his first major competition did not come until the 1945 Kaleva Games in Turku, where he finished fourth in the 5000 metres event as a member of Virolahden Sampo. Despite winning the following year, however, he was not selected to represent Finland at the 1946 European Athletics Championships.

== Competitive career ==
In 1947, Koskela was first ranked eighth in the world for the 5000 metres. He got his chance to compete on the international stage in 1948 when he attended that year's Summer Olympic Games in London and placed 7th in a field of 33 competitors in the men's 5000 metres. He had been the Finnish national champion in the 5000 metres and cross-country distances that year and would retain the former title in 1949, during which period his world ranking fell to ninth, before to second (behind Emil Zátopek). He also entered the 10,000 metres chart in 1949, ranking fifth in the world.

The following year Koskela captured his only major international medal, winning bronze in the 10,000 metres event at the 1950 European Athletics Championships. Nonetheless, he fell to sixth and seventh in that year's rankings for the 5000 and 10,000 metres respectively, moving up to sixth in the 10,000 metres in 1951. By the time of the 1952 Summer Olympics (held in his native Finland) he was suffering from muscle pains and was not ranked among the top ten globally in either discipline. In Helsinki he finished 16th in a field of 33 participants in the men's 10,000 metres and did not make the finals of the men's 5000 metres.

== Later life ==
Koskela retired soon after the Helsinki Olympic Games and focused full-time on farming. As of 2012 he remained active and opened a local athletics event in 2011 at the age of 90 in the village of Pyterlahti, near his home town. His youngest daughter, Taina Sampakoski, was nominated for the Finlandia Prize in 2006. On 10 September 2016, he died at the age of 95.
