= Stan Cox =

British distance runner

Personal information
- Nationality: British (English)
- Born: 15 July 1918 Wood Green, London, England
- Died: 27 June 2012 (aged 93) Felixstowe, Suffolk, England
- Height: 173 cm (5 ft 8 in)
- Weight: 60 kg (132 lb)

Sport
- Sport: Athletics
- Event: long-distance
- Club: Southgate Harriers

Stanley Ernest Walter Cox (15 July 1918 – 27 June 2012) was a British athlete who competed in two Olympic games in 1948 and 1952. Cox served with Royal Air Force in World War II before competing in the 10,000-metre event at the 1948 Summer Olympics. Unable to participate in the 1950 British Empire Games, he returned to the Olympics in 1952, although he did not complete his event, the marathon, due to the flu. At the 1954 British Empire and Commonwealth Games, he suffered a sunstroke and collapsed within two miles (3 km) of the finish. He retired from running in 1956, but continued to work with UK Athletics for several years and was due to participate in the ceremonies of the 2012 Summer Olympics.

== Early life ==
Cox was born on 15 July 1918 in Wood Green, England and began his professional running career in 1939. During World War II, he served in Iraq with the Royal Air Force.

== Athletic career ==
After returning to competition and shortly before the Olympics, Cox became the British 6 miles champion after winning the British AAA Championships title at the 1948 AAA Championships. Cox was only allowed two days off work for the 1948 Summer Olympics, one to observe the opening ceremonies and a second actually to compete.

In 1948, Cox was the British six-mile (10 km) champion, with a time of approximately 29 minutes. In the men's 10,000 metres competition, he did not receive a medal, placing seventh. He later claimed that he was told by 1924 Olympian Harold Abrahams that he had run an extra lap due to confusion caused by Emil Zátopek and should have placed fifth instead. In 1952, he was due to compete in the marathon event, but after riding in a drafty aeroplane to the competition he awoke the day of the race with a paralysed left side. It was later discovered that he was suffering from the flu.

In 1949, Cox finished second behind Valdu Lillakas in the 6 miles event at the 1949 AAA Championships. Cox was a Great Britain International from 1939 to 1956. He had qualified for the 1950 British Empire Games, but his employers threatened to fire him if he attended, so he remained at home.

Cox was runner-up three times in the AAA marathon in 1952, 1954 and 1956 and competed in the 1954 British Empire and Commonwealth Games in the marathon event, but did not receive a medal. During the race he, along with fellow athlete Jim Peters, was afflicted with severe hyperthermia and was taken to hospital after running into a post, with only two miles remaining. His personal best time in the marathon was 2 hours and 18 minutes.

== Later life ==
After retiring from running in 1956, he worked as a judge with British Amateur Athletics Association. During his tenure at this job, he was hit by a javelin while judging the throw of another competitor, an incident that nearly killed him. Cox, who lived in Felixstowe for nearly 30 years, was seeking to take an active part in the 2012 Summer Olympics and a campaign began to make him a participant in the games' ceremonies. He led a weekly walk group to remain fit and active, walking an average of four miles (6 km) a day, until a year before his death on 27 June 2012.
