= Sim Bok-seok =

South Korean long-distance runner (1928–1998)

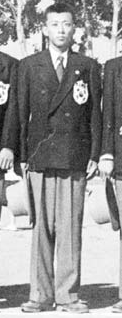

Personal information
- Nationality: South Korean
- Born: 16 October 1928
- Died: 13 August 1998 (aged 69)

Sport
- Sport: Long-distance running
- Event: 5000 metres

Sim Bok-seok (Korean: 심복석; 16 October 1928 – 13 August 1998), also written as Shim Pong-Sik or Bok Suk Shim, was a South Korean long-distance runner. He competed in the men's 5000 metres at the 1948 Summer Olympics.

== Career ==
Sim attended Korea University. He set a record in July 1948 and his debut at the London Olympics was anticipated by the Korean public. A farewell party was held for him before he left.

Sim was part of the "Joseon Olympic team" (Korean: 조선 올림픽 대표단). He was seeded in the first heat of the 5000 metres at the 1948 Olympics. He finished in 10th place and did not advance to the finals.

He was described as being close to the world record in 1948.

At the 1949 Korean National Sports Festival, Sim was selected to open the games by taking an oath representing the athletes.

He won the 1952 South Korean Athletics Championships over 5000 m, running a time of 15:36 minutes. Also in 1952, Sim set a South Korean marathon record that still stood as of 1958. He was recruited to Brigham Young University beginning in 1952.

Representing the BYU Cougars track and field team, Sim won the school's intramural mile in 1954.

Sim was called a "mystery man" following his entry into the 1955 Boston Marathon. At the race, Sim led the race at the 19-mile mark. He was later passed and dropped out of the race at Heartbreak Hill. He was said to have run out of energy because he had no support to feed him.

Sim set a dual meet record in the mile for BYU in 1956, running 4:20.8 minutes. He went on to finish 6th in the 5000 metres at the 1956 NCAA Division I Outdoor Track and Field Championships, taking the lead on the 9th lap. He was selected for a European tour in July of that year.

He also competed in cross country running for BYU, winning the 1956 Intermountain Amateur Athletic Union cross country championships and leading his team to victory there as well.

He was one of two runners chosen to represent 'Man' in a Man vs. Horse ultra-marathon race in 1957. However, he was replaced in November 1957. It was rumored that he withdrew because he was afraid he would lose his amateur standing, as the horses were not Amateur Athletic Union members.

Sim trained running 10 to 20 miles daily in preparation for the 1958 Boston Marathon. He ran 8 miles in 44 minutes and 46 seconds in training, and reportedly would try a new type of running shoe for the race. To maximize his red blood cell production, Sim purposefully did not fly from high-altitude Utah to Boston until just before the race day. To maintain energy, he would be fed water and sweet bread during the competition. He was accompanied en route by his coach and Morton Hack, the creator of the new rippled shoes Sim wore. At the race he finished in 35th place, running a time of 3:18:46 hours. He said that the stitching on the experimental shoes cut his feet and the heat hampered his performance.

== Personal life ==
Sim was born on 16 October 1928 in Hamgyong Province, Korea. He was one of four children. During the Korean War, Sim was a translator for the South Korean and American military.

Sim attended Korea University and then studied abroad in the United States at Brigham Young University. He was a senior at BYU in April 1958. He was trained by Dave Geddes, who was also a health instructor at BYU. He was called Dr. Geddes' "personal plodder".

Sim was also the president of the school's Far East club. He helped obtain a student visa for Korean dancer Ae Suk Choe.

After his graduation from BYU, Sim moved to California and became an American citizen. He worked for ARCO until his retirement in 1985. He was a convert to the Church of Jesus Christ of Latter-day Saints. He married BYU graduate student Doris Yoshiko in August 1960.

Sim later married Jean Chang Sil and had three children plus a son-in-law. He died on 13 August 1998, at the age of 69.

In 2019, a scrapbook containing Sim's autograph was brought to auction. He was the only male track and field athlete represented in the book.
