= Aage Poulsen =

Danish long-distance runner

Personal information
- Nationality: Danish
- Born: 16 July 1919
- Died: 31 August 1998 (aged 79)

Sport
- Sport: Long-distance running
- Event: 5000 metres

Aage Poulsen (16 July 1919 – 31 August 1998) was a Danish long-distance runner. Between 1941 and 1951, Poulsen won ten medals at the Danish national championships, across multiple distances, including three golds. He competed in the men's 5000 metres at the 1948 Summer Olympics.
