= Alain Mimoun =

Algerian-born French long-distance runner

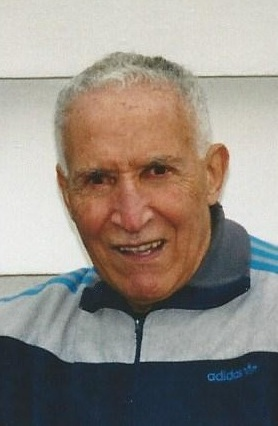
- Mimoun in 2001

Personal information
- Nationality: French
- Born: Ali Mimoun Ould Kacha; 1 January 1921 Telagh, Oran department, French Algeria, France
- Died: 27 June 2013 (aged 92) Saint-Mandé, France
- Height: 1.70 m (5 ft 7 in)
- Weight: 56 kg (123 lb)

Sport
- Sport: long-distance running
- Events: 5,000 metres, 10,000 metres, marathon and cross-country running
Medal record
Men's athletics
Representing France
Olympic Games
Gold medal – first place	1956 Melbourne	Marathon
Silver medal – second place	1948 London	10,000 m
Silver medal – second place	1952 Helsinki	5,000 m
Silver medal – second place	1952 Helsinki	10,000 m
International Cross Country Championships
Gold medal – first place	1946 Ayr	Team Race
Gold medal – first place	1947 Paris	Team Race
Gold medal – first place	1949 Dublin	Individual Race
Gold medal – first place	1949 Dublin	Team Race
Gold medal – first place	1950 Brussels	Team Race
Gold medal – first place	1952 Hamilton	Individual Race
Gold medal – first place	1952 Hamilton	Team Race
Gold medal – first place	1954 Birmingham	Individual Race
Gold medal – first place	1956 Belfast	Individual Race
Gold medal – first place	1956 Belfast	Team Race
Silver medal – second place	1950 Brussels	Individual Race
Silver medal – second place	1958 Cardiff	Individual Race
European Championships
Silver medal – second place	1950 Brussels	5000 m
Silver medal – second place	1950 Brussels	10,000 m
Mediterranean Games
Gold medal – first place	1951 Alexandria	5,000 m
Gold medal – first place	1951 Alexandria	10,000 m
Gold medal – first place	1955 Barcelona	5,000 m
Gold medal – first place	1955 Barcelona	10,000 m

Alain Mimoun, born Ali Mimoun Ould Kacha (1 January 1921 – 27 June 2013), was a French long-distance runner who competed in track events, cross-country running and the marathon. He was the 1956 Olympic champion in the marathon. He is the most bemedalled French athletics sportsperson in history. In 1999, readers of the French athletics magazine Athlétisme Magazine voted him as the “French Athlete of the 20th Century”.

On the track Mimoun won three Olympic silver medals, finishing second behind Emil Zátopek in the 10,000 metres final in 1948 and again second behind him in both the 5,000 metres and 10,000 metres finals in 1952. He was also the silver medallist in both events behind Zátopek at the 1950 European Athletics Championships. From 1949 to 1958, he won four individual gold medals and two individual silver medals at the International Cross Country Championships. He was a four-time gold medallist at the Mediterranean Games, completing the 5,000 m/10,000 m double in both 1951 and 1955.

Born in Algeria, Mimoun fought military battles for France and the Western Allies during World War II. He settled in metropolitan France shortly after leaving the French army. Overall, he represented France in four consecutive Olympic Games from 1948 to 1960. He competed internationally for France on 86 occasions. From 1947 to 1966, he won a total of 29 senior titles in the 5,000 m, 10,000 m, marathon and cross-country events of the French national championships. Mimoun continued to run in his later life and set a number of veteran age-category records.

== Early life ==
Alain Mimoun was born Ali Mimoun Ould Kacha in the arrondissement of Maïder in the town of Telagh, Algeria, into a very poor, Arab-Berber family. Ali was the oldest of seven children in the family and his parents were peasants. His mother, Halima, also wove blankets for a living. He had always been a model pupil in primary school. When he was eleven, he finished his primary school education and obtained a certificate with mention bien. In view of his good academic results, his illiterate mother wanted him to become a primary school teacher. She applied for a scholarship for Ali after being told to do so by some colonists who had come to visit her. Ali was denied the scholarship—it was the only application rejected by the school—that could have enabled him to further his studies. He noted that sons of colonists with worse grades than he obtained their scholarships. When Ali learned of his scholarship rejection, he told his mother that Algeria was not his country and that his country was on the other side of the Mediterranean, even though he was against colonization. He said that as a teenager, he would dream that he was in front of maps and show France to his mother. Ali first worked as a mason, and then in a hardware shop when he was fourteen. He said that hardware shop owner was a Frenchman who came from France, was an admirable man who treated him like his son and with whom he would eat on the same table. Ali started to play association football when he was twelve and practice cycling when he was fifteen.

== World War II and early running career ==
Mimoun enlisted in the French Army in 1939 when he was about 18 years old. In the same year, he was posted to the 19th infantry regiment. In September 1939, he was mobilised to the Franco-Belgian border. He spent nine months there in anticipation of the German offensive campaign – the Battle of Belgium. He engaged in combat at the Franco-Belgian border. After the fall of Belgium to the Germans in May 1940, his regiment retreated south into northern France, where he avoided being captured by the German army near Valenciennes. After France was defeated by the Germans in June 1940, Mimoun was posted to Bourg-en-Bresse in the Free Zone of Vichy France. When he was there, he discovered almost by accident a talent for long-distance running. He said that he joined in a race as he was passing a suburban track with some friends. While he was in Bourg-en-Bresse, he would train regularly in a stadium next to the military barracks. One day, he competed in some local racing events without any preparations. He won his first running event, the 1,500-metre Ain departmental championship, in front of 4,000 spectators. In that event, he beat the defending champion, thus ending his six-year reign as champion. He then finished a 5,000-meter race in under sixteen minutes. This prompted a local journalist to write, "A marathoner is born. He could become an Olympic champion." In 1942, Mimoun was posted to a regiment of combat engineers based in Besançon. Later that year, he was transferred to Algeria, where he won numerous races on track and in cross country, including the 1942 North African cross country running championship title.

Mimoun's running career was interrupted when he was called up to fight for the Western Allies in the Tunisia Campaign and then in the Italian Campaign. In the Tunisia Campaign, he fought under the command of General Henri Giraud against the Afrika Korps. In July 1943, he was sent to fight in the Italian Campaign, where he was a lance corporal in the 83rd combat engineers battalion of the Algerian 3rd infantry division of the French Expeditionary Corps commanded by Marshal Alphonse Juin. On 28 January 1944, during the Battle of Monte Cassino, Mimoun was seriously injured by fragmentation in his left leg originating from shells fired by the Germans. American doctors working in the field hospital recommended its amputation. Determined not to lose his leg, he refused. Fortunately, a French surgeon there managed to successfully perform an operation and his left leg was saved. He was later sent to a Naples hospital for convalescence. He recovered sufficiently to the extent that he could still engage in military combat in the last part of World War II. In the summer of 1944, Lance Corporal Mimoun participated in the Allied invasion of France from the Mediterranean Sea. After that campaign, he was involved in the liberation of the Jura Mountains from the German troops. He spent the winter of 1944–1945 in the Vosges Mountains before taking part in the Western Allied invasion of Germany. He spent about one year in Germany.

After his stint in the army in Europe had ended, Mimoun returned to Algeria where he continued to participate in running events. He was demobilised in 1946 while he was in Algiers. Upon leaving the French Army after seven years of service, he moved from Algeria to Paris. There, he signed up with the Racing Club de France, a famous sports club, and began calling himself Alain. The club arranged for him to work as a waiter in the café-bar of its facilities, which were then located in the Bois de Boulogne, and Mimoun would train in that park. In October 2002 and March 2012, Mimoun spoke of his difficult return to civilian life, "I was a café waiter. I did not have enough to eat. I won four Olympic medals while I was living in a small, two-room apartment (in the 19th arrondissement of Paris) without heating, shower and toilet." Mimoun caused a major surprise by finishing second in the 1946 French national championships 10,000-meter race, despite having lost a shoe during the race. He made his international debut the following year when he represented France in an athletics meeting against Czechoslovakia in Prague. He established himself at national level in 1947 when he clinched his first French national championships titles, taking a track double in the 5,000 metres and 10,000 metres races.

== Running career from 1948 onwards ==
=== Before the 1956 Olympic Games ===
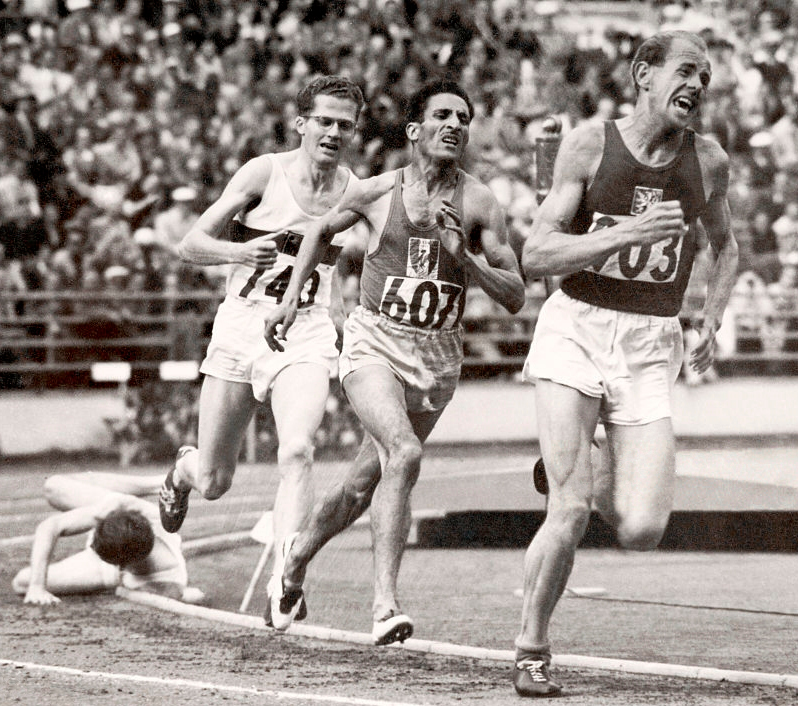
Alain Mimoun at the Olympic Games of Helsinky in 1952

Mimoun rose to international prominence at the 1948 Summer Olympics. He was the runner-up in the 10,000 m final held at the Wembley Stadium on 31 July, behind the Czechoslovak runner Emil Zátopek. Zátopek was dominant and lapped all competitors bar Mimoun and bronze medallist Bertil Albertsson. Mimoun finished 47.8 seconds and more than 300 meters behind Zátopek. Mimoun also ran in the 5,000 m event of the 1948 Summer Olympics but did not progress to the final round. The following year he won the 5,000 m and 10,000 m French national championships titles and won his first major race at the International Cross Country Championships in Dublin, finishing ahead of compatriot Raphaël Pujazon in the individual event. He also led France to the team title.

He claimed cross country and 10,000 m French national championships titles in 1950, but on the international stage he was again second best to Zátopek, taking the silver medals in the 5,000 m and 10,000 m events at the 1950 European Athletics Championships. At the 1950 International Cross Country Championships he was runner-up to Belgium's Lucien Theys in the individual race, but retained the team title with France. He won the 5,000 m and 10,000 m gold medals at the 1951 Mediterranean Games and swept the French national championships 5,000 m, 10,000 m and cross country titles in both 1951 and 1952.

Mimoun topped the podium for the individual and team events at the International Cross Country Championships in March 1952. The 1952 Helsinki Olympics saw by now a familiar sight: Zátopek claimed victory in the 5,000 m and 10,000 m races and Mimoun was the silver medallist in both. In the 10,000 m final Mimoun finished 15.8 seconds behind Zátopek, but 15.4 seconds ahead of the bronze medallist Aleksandr Anufriyev. In the 5,000 m final, Mimoun, Herbert Schade and Christopher Chataway were in the lead entering the final bend of the last lap, with Zátopek in fourth place. Zátopek then made his move, and he took the lead halfway through the final bend and never relinquished it. Zátopek finished the 5,000 m race 4.5m and 0.8 second ahead of Mimoun, with the latter improving his personal best by over 14 seconds. His second-place finishes behind the Czechoslovak champion gave Mimoun the nickname "Zátopek's Shadow".

Away from Zátopek, Mimoun continued to dominate the French scene and claimed a third individual title at the International Cross Country Championships in 1954, although a foot injury left him unable to compete at the 1954 European Athletics Championships later that year. His 1955 was highlighted by the successful defence of his 5,000m and 10,000m track titles at both the 1955 Mediterranean Games and the French national championships.

On 10 October 1955 in Algiers, Mimoun beat the French national record for the one hour run that had been held by Jean Bouin since 6 July 1913. On that day, Mimoun ran a distance of 19 km 78 metres, compared to the 19 km 21 metres (which then became a new world record) ran by Bouin on 6 July 1913 in Stockholm.

Mimoun began 1956 in strong form, capturing the French national championships 5,000m, 10,000m and cross country titles, and winning what would be his fourth and final individual title at the International Cross Country Championships.

=== 1956 Olympic Games ===
Mimoun faltered in his first event at the 1956 Melbourne Olympics, managing only twelfth place in the 10,000 m final – 1 minute and 32.4 seconds behind Soviet winner Vladimir Kuts.

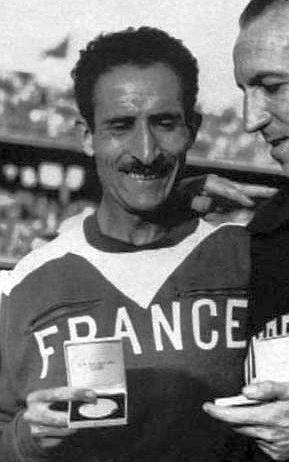
Alain Mimoun with his award

Mimoun entered the Olympic marathon race that took place in sweltering heat – the temperature went up to 38 °C (100.4 °F) in the shade during the race – on 1 December 1956, with the defending champion Emil Zátopek in the starting line-up. He was certain that day would be his lucky day. Frenchmen had won the Olympic marathon in 1900 (Michel Théato), and 28 years later in 1928 (Boughera El Ouafi). Now, 28 years had passed since the last French victory in 1928. One month ago, he had gone on a pilgrimage to the Basilica of St. Thérèse in Lisieux, France. The day before the marathon, Mimoun received a telegram from his wife, Germaine, back in France telling him of the birth of their first child, a daughter called Olympe. Besides, Mimoun was wearing on his blue, French flag-bearing, running singlet what he considered to be the lucky number – number 13. The 1.70 m tall, 56 kg heavy Frenchman had never raced over the distance before but he excelled on his first attempt. The marathon started at 15:13 inside the Melbourne Cricket Ground. It had forty-six competitors representing twenty-three nations. The marathon had a false start, which was the first in Olympic history. The mustachioed Mimoun had a white bandana, embroidered with his wife's initials, tied around the top of his head since the start of the race to protect himself from the sun's rays. A group of thirteen runners was leading the race after fifteen kilometers. At the twenty-kilometer mark, only five of them remained in that group. The American John J. Kelley patted Mimoun's back to urge him to take the lead together with him. The two of them then broke away from the leading group of runners, with Kelley briefly ahead of Mimoun. Mimoun surged forward in the uphill section of the course near the top of the hill, ran past Kelley and was solely in the lead before the halfway point of the marathon. By the 25-km mark he had opened a 50-second lead, and henceforth, no competitor came close to him again. In the last quarter of the race, Mimoun removed his white bandana from his head and threw it onto the road surface, because according to him, it "felt like a ton". 5 km from the finish line, he no longer took the cups of water on tables lining the course as he pulled further away from his fellow runners. Mimoun crossed the finish line in a time of 2:25:00, 1 minute and 32 seconds ahead of the runner-up Franjo Mihalić, in front of 110,000 spectators at the Melbourne Cricket Ground and before any other runner had entered the stadium. For the third time in a row, the Olympic marathon had been won by an athlete competing in his first marathon. It was the first time Mimoun had ever beaten Emil Zátopek in a running event. Mimoun had expected to see his great rival and close friend Zátopek finish second behind him. He waited at the finish line for the Czechoslovak runner to arrive. Zátopek, who had undergone hernia surgery six weeks earlier, crossed the finishing line in sixth place, four minutes and thirty-four seconds after Mimoun. Grabbing Zátopek's shoulder, Mimoun asked, "Emil, why don't you congratulate me? I am an Olympic champion. It was I who won." Zátopek, who was then a colonel in the Czechoslovak army, stood to attention, took off his white cap and saluted Mimoun. Zátopek then kissed and embraced Mimoun, saying, "You did great, Alain." In a later interview with Sports Illustrated, Mimoun said, "For me, that was better than the medal". That was the last time Mimoun raced against Zátopek. "When I entered the stadium's tunnel and came out onto the track, cheered by 100,000 spectators, I experienced the finest minutes of my life," Mimoun said later.

On his return home from Melbourne, there was a crowd of 15,000 people, a hero's welcome and a red carpet awaiting Mimoun at Paris' Orly Airport. At the airport, he did not get a chance to walk on the red carpet as he was carried in triumph by the crowd. Thereafter, receptions were held in his honour for three months. The day after he arrived home from Melbourne, he returned to the regular job that he had been doing since 1946 – as a waiter in a café-bar at the Racing Club de France

“I was sure Emil was there at my heels,” Mimoun told Sports Illustrated in 1972. “I was hoping he would be second. I was waiting for him. Then I thought, well, he would be third. It would be nice to stand on the podium with him again. But Emil came in sixth, oh, very tired. He seemed to be in a trance, staring straight ahead. He said nothing." Mimoun later told a biographer, Pat Butcher, that he had been well-prepared for racing the Melbourne Olympics marathon. "I gorged myself on 40 km a day for two years, without telling a soul." "He would train three times a day, running a daily total distance of 35 km. It was certainly not for the 10,000-meter race, even though he had told me that he would not contest the marathon," said Mimoun's wife, Germaine, during an interview in 2006 with AFP. Mimoun revealed that before leaving for Melbourne for the 1956 Olympics, he had done his final training in the Corrèze village of Bugeat, which resembled his native village in Algeria. In an interview conducted in October 2002, Mimoun said,"When I announced that I was going to run the 1956 Melbourne Olympics marathon, everyone told me that I was too old. The French, the foreigners and everyone were laughing except Zátopek."

Reflecting on the four Olympic medals that he had won, Mimoun remarked, "I compare my career to a castle: my London silver medal is the foundation; my two Helsinki silver medals are the walls; my gold medal in Melbourne is the roof."

Upon hearing the news of the death of Emil Zátopek in November 2000, he stated, "I have not lost an opponent, I have lost a brother."

=== After the 1956 Olympic Games ===
Mimoun did not compete in 1957 but returned in 1958 with a runner-up finish behind Stan Eldon in the individual race at the International Cross Country Championships and his first national marathon title. He placed seventh in the 10,000-meter event at the 1958 European Athletics Championships. In 1959 he came sixth in the individual race at the International Cross Country Championships, and won national titles in the marathon and cross country. As he neared his forties, his athletic powers began to decline. Although he continued to compete, he did not win a national title on grass or the track after 1959. Four further outings from 1960 to 1964 at the International Cross Country Championships saw finishes in the individual event ranging from 18th to 26th place.

Mimoun made the French team for the 1960 Summer Olympics in Rome and placed 34th in the marathon. He won his final national championship title at the senior level – the marathon – in 1966, some twenty years after his debut. His career at the top of the national and international ranks finished at that point but he continued to be a presence as a veteran runner. At the age of 51, he completed a marathon in a time of 2:34:36.2. He set French age-category records for the 5,000 m, 10,000 m, 20,000 m and the one hour run. He won a total of more than 80 French national running championships titles, including those for veteran athletes, the last one while in his seventies. In the last years of his life, he continued to jog or racewalk almost daily, up to 10–15 miles per day, on the roads and paths in the vicinity of his detached house in Champigny-sur-Marne in Val-de-Marne department, at the Bois de Vincennes and on the roads around Bugeat in Corrèze department.

== Later life and legacy ==
After Mimoun arrived back home from the 1956 Melbourne Olympics, he mooted the idea of creating a world-class sports training center in France. In order to take advantage of better training facilities, he had to train overseas, especially in Sweden, for some of his running events. That was something that annoyed him and therefore he felt that it was necessary to build such a sports training center. Mimoun attempted to seek government funding to build it. After several failed attempts in previous years, he received a telephone call from Jacques Chirac to meet him in the Hôtel Matignon. During that meeting in 1967, Chirac, who was then a senior civil servant working as Prime Minister Georges Pompidou's technical adviser, told Mimoun, "I have followed your entire (running) career and I like your idea of creating a (sports) training center in Corrèze." The following day, Mimoun was received by the Sports Minister François Missoffe in his office and informed by him that government funding for the sports training center had been approved. The sports training center – initially named Centre national d'entraînement sportif – located in the Corrèze village of Bugeat, was later renamed Espace 1000 Sources. Right after Mimoun's funeral in July 2013, the sports training center was rechristened Centre sportif Alain Mimoun

Mimoun worked as a waiter in a café-bar at the Racing Club de France and as a physical education instructor in France after the end of World War II.

When Mimoun settled in metropolitan France after the end of World War II, he first lived in Paris. Then, he moved to Champigny-sur-Marne. He and his wife, Germaine, bought a second home in Bugeat and he would go to live there each summer.

In 1997, Mimoun protested in the strongest terms against the decision of the Comité national olympique et sportif français (CNOSF) to remove the Gallic rooster from the jerseys of French athletes.

For his successful running career and wartime military services, Mimoun received four Legion of Honour awards during his lifetime from four different presidents of France: Chevalier (1956), Officier (1972), Commandeur (1999) and Grand Officier(2008). He also received the Sporting Order of Merit (Ordre du Mérite sportif), Gloire du sport, and the National Order of Merit. He is the first French person of North African origin to receive the Legion of Honour.

Mimoun was chosen as the French L'Équipe Champion of Champions in 1949 and again in 1956.

In 1999, readers of the bimonthly, French athletics magazine Athlétisme voted him as the “French Athlete of the 20th Century”.

On 25 September 2002 in Argenteuil, Mimoun inaugurated the 50th stadium bearing his name.

In December 2012, L'Equipe presented him its first trophée de champion des champions de légende.

At the time of Mimoun's death, more than a hundred and fifty stadia, schools and streets bore his name. More than 50 municipal athletics stadia in France were named Stade Alain Mimoun and more than a dozen streets in France were named after him.

== Family and personal life ==
Mimoun's wife, Germaine, was born in Tulle, capital of the Corrèze département in the Limousin region in central France. She died in May 2013. Their first child, a daughter named Olympe, was born on 30 November 1956, one day before Mimoun won the 1956 Olympics marathon in Melbourne. They have another daughter, Pascale.

Mimoun converted from Islam to Roman Catholicism in 1955. Several months before the 1956 Olympics in Melbourne, he had deep doubts about his ability to participate in those Olympics. In desperation, he let himself be driven by an atheist friend to the Basilica of St. Thérèse in Lisieux. One month after his pilgrimage there, he won the 1956 Olympics marathon. Mimoun asserted that he owed that marathon win to Saint Thérèse of Lisieux. After that victory, he became very attached to Saint Thérèse of Lisieux. He would go to the Basilica of St. Thérèse in Lisieux every year on a pilgrimage, usually on 1 October – the feast day of the saint. Prior to his death, he had a chapel constructed in the Bugeat cemetery to serve as his final resting place.

== Honours ==
Legion of Honour

- Chevalier de la Légion d'honneur (1956) awarded by René Coty
- Officier de la Légion d'honneur (1972) awarded by Georges Pompidou
- Commandeur de la Légion d'honneur (1999) awarded by Jacques Chirac
- Grand officier de la Légion d'honneur (2008) awarded by Nicolas Sarkozy

Others

- Chevalier de l'Ordre national du Mérite.
- Commandeur de l’Ordre du Mérite sportif.
- Gloire du sport.
- Champion des champions de L'Équipe (L'Équipe Champion of Champions) (1949 and 1956)
- named French Athlete of the 20th Century in 1999
- Trophée de champion des champions de légende (2012)

== Death, tributes and funeral ==
Alain Mimoun died at the age of 92 in the evening of 27 June 2013 at the Hôpital d'instruction des armées Bégin in Saint-Mandé, in the departement of Val-de-Marne in the Île-de-France region. The cause of death was not disclosed.

In a communiqué made public by the Élysée Palace French President François Hollande wrote that Alain Mimoun was "a magnificent Frenchman" and "left a deep mark on the history of French sport". "Throughout his life, Alain Mimoun, who was born in Algeria, loved and served France. And he was very attached to his department of Corrèze," emphasized Hollande, who also has ties to the area.

French Prime Minister Jean-Marc Ayrault emphasized Mimoun's “exceptional victory” at the 1956 Olympics marathon and called him “a great servant of France who etched his name in the pantheon of French sport”. Ayrault concluded that “the death of Mimoun left France without one of her finest figures”.

The French minister of sports, Valérie Fourneyron, hailed Mimoun as "one of the most endearing and loved figures of French sport". "All French people will remember him as the most medalled French athletics sportsperson of all time, above all as a model of uprightness and kindness," added Fourneyron.

Michel Jazy, a French Olympic runner who shared a room with Mimoun for six weeks during the 1956 Olympics, remembered seeing him show the intensity and professionalism in order to succeed at the Olympics. "Alain was a role model for me. He would wake me up at 5:30 in the morning to go and run, and in the evening he would force me to go to bed at 8:30. Even though we were at the Olympics Games, I could not go to the parties in the Olympic village!" Jazy told RTL radio on the day after Mimoun's death.

The Comité national olympique et sportif français (CNOSF) described Mimoun as someone who "embodied selflessness and panache", "was devoted to the humanist values of sport" and "who would forever be among the sportspersons who had given French sport its finest hours".

On 6 July 2013, a minute's silence in honour of Mimoun's memory was held in front of 50,000 spectators during the 2013 edition of the Meeting Areva – an annual track and field event – that took place at the Stade de France.

Mimoun was accorded a state funeral will military honors. It was held on Monday, 8 July 2013 at 10am local time, in the main courtyard of the Hôtel national des Invalides in Paris. French President François Hollande presided over the ceremony, during which he paid homage to Mimoun. Retired French athletes like Stéphane Diagana, Michel Jazy and Marie-José Pérec attended the ceremony. In his eulogy, Hollande said,"Today, it is all of France which is paying homage to Alain Mimoun, to the one who ran throughout his life on the tracks of stadiums in order to make the La Marseillaise resound, seeking glory for his country everywhere." Hollande described Mimoun as "a courageous soldier, an exceptional sportsman and a fervent patriot" who was "loved by France" and stated, "To Alain Mimoun, France was a choice, a passion, a pride and an ideal."

In the afternoon of 9 July 2013, Mimoun was buried in the cemetery in Bugeat after a religious ceremony in the Bugeat church. The funeral was attended by about sixty persons.

== Personal bests ==
- 5,000 metres – 14 min 7.58 sec (1952 Olympic Games 5,000 m final)
- 10,000 metres – 29 min 13.4 sec (1956)
- Marathon – 2 hr 21 min 25 sec (1958)
- Information from Sports Reference profile.

== Competition record ==
=== International (only the position in the final is indicated) ===
Mimoun competed internationally for France on 86 occasions.

Year	Competition	Venue	Position	Event	Notes
1948	Olympic Games	London, United Kingdom	2nd	10,000 metres	
1949	International Cross Country Championships	Dublin, Ireland	1st	Individual race	
1950	International Cross Country Championships	Brussels, Belgium	2nd	Individual race	
1950	European Championships	Brussels, Belgium	2nd	5,000 metres	
1950	European Championships	Brussels, Belgium	2nd	10,000 metres	
1951	Mediterranean Games	Alexandria, Egypt	1st	5,000 metres	
1951	Mediterranean Games	Alexandria, Egypt	1st	10,000 metres	
1952	International Cross Country Championships	Hamilton, Scotland	1st	Individual race	
1952	Olympic Games	Helsinki, Finland	2nd	5,000 metres	
1952	Olympic Games	Helsinki, Finland	2nd	10,000 metres	
1954	International Cross Country Championships	Birmingham, England	1st	Individual race	
1955	Mediterranean Games	Barcelona, Spain	1st	5,000 metres	
1955	Mediterranean Games	Barcelona, Spain	1st	10,000 metres	
1956	International Cross Country Championships	Belfast, Northern Ireland	1st	Individual race	
1956	Olympic Games	Melbourne, Australia	12th	10,000 metres	
1956	Olympic Games	Melbourne, Australia	1st	Marathon	
1958	International Cross Country Championships	Cardiff, Wales	2nd	Individual race	
1958	European Championships	Stockholm, Sweden	7th	10,000 metres	
1959	International Cross Country Championships	Lisbon, Portugal	6th	Individual race	
1960	International Cross Country Championships	Hamilton, Scotland	18th	Individual race	
1960	Olympic Games	Rome, Italy	34th	Marathon	
1961	International Cross Country Championships	Nantes, France	24th	Individual race	
1962	International Cross Country Championships	Sheffield, England	26th	Individual race	
1964	International Cross Country Championships	Dublin, Ireland	18th	Individual race	

- International Cross Country Championships team event champion (representing France) in 1946, 1947, 1949, 1950, 1952 and 1956.
- North African Cross Country champion in 1942

=== National ===
French Athletics Championships

- 5,000 m : 8 titles (1947, 1949, 1951, 1952, 1953, 1954, 1955 and 1956)
- 10,000 m : 9 titles (1947, 1949, 1950, 1951, 1952, 1953, 1954, 1955, 1956)
- Marathon : 6 titles (1958, 1959, 1960, 1964, 1965 and 1966)

French Cross Country Championships

- 6 titles (1950, 1951, 1952, 1954, 1956 and 1959)
