= Väinö Mäkelä =

Finnish long-distance runner

Väinö Mäkelä (20 December 1921 – 19 December 1982) was a Finnish long-distance runner who competed in the 1948 Summer Olympics. He finished in 8th place in the men's 5000 metres.
