= Viljo Heino =

Finnish long-distance runner

Medal record

Men's athletics

Representing Finland

European Championships
Gold medal – first place	1946 Oslo	10,000 m

Viljo ("Ville") Akseli Heino (1 March 1914 in Iitti – 15 September 1998 in Tampere) was a Finnish athlete who held the world record for the 10,000 metres event from 25 August 1944 to 11 June 1949 and again from 1 September 1949 to 22 October 1949. He was the male Finnish Sportspersonality of the year for 1949.

Born in Iitti, he represented Finland in the 10,000 metres and marathon in the 1948 Summer Olympics in London. He also won the Saint Silvester Road Race in São Paulo in 1949.

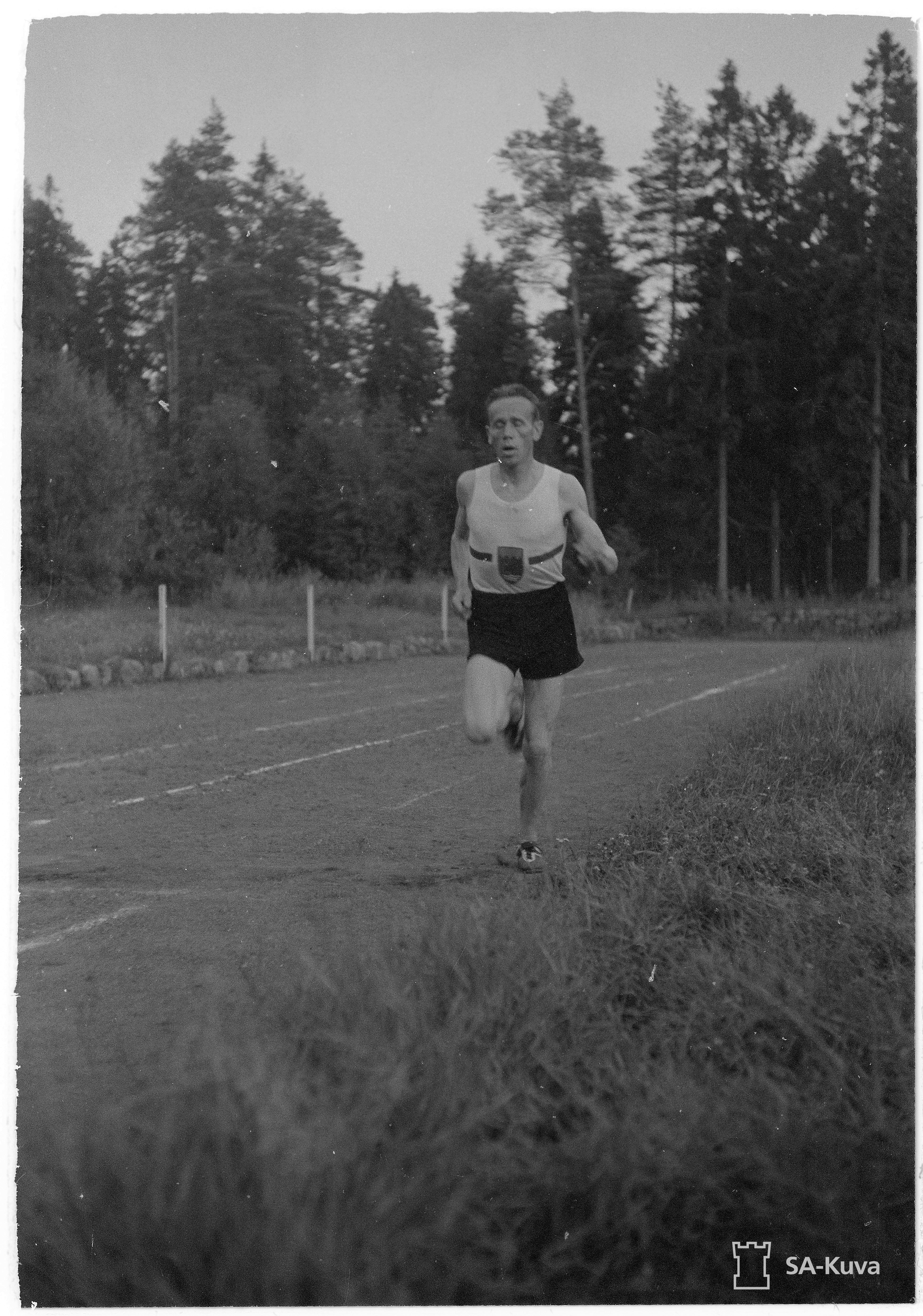
Viljo Heino (1944)

Records
Preceded by (Finland) Taisto Mäki	Men's 10,000 m World Record Holder; 25 August 1944 – 11 June 1949	Succeeded by (Czech Republic) Emil Zátopek
Preceded by (Czech Republic) Emil Zátopek	Men's 10,000 m World Record Holder; 1 September 1949 – 22 October 1949	Succeeded by (Czech Republic) Emil Zátopek
