= Vasilios Mavrapostolos =

Greek long-distance runner

Personal information
- Nationality: Greek
- Born: 25 April 1916
- Died: 2006 (aged 89–90)

Sport
- Sport: Long-distance running
- Event: 5000 metres

Vasilios Mavrapostolos (Greek: Βασίλειος Μαυροπόστολος; 25 April 1916 – 1995) was a Greek long-distance runner. He competed in the men's 5000 metres at the 1948 Summer Olympics.
