= Jacques Vernier (athlete) =

French long-distance runner

Jacques Vernier (21 July 1923 – 14 April 2015) was a French long-distance runner who competed in the 1948 Summer Olympics. He was the twin brother of fellow Olympic athlete Jean Vernier.
