= Emil Zátopek =

Czechoslovak long-distance runner (1922–2000)

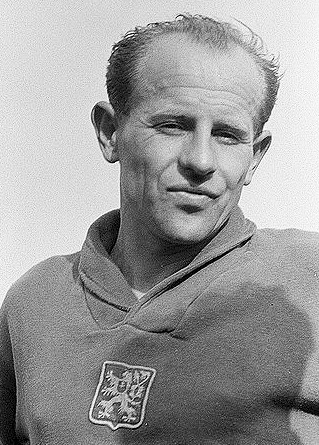
- Zátopek in 1952

Personal information
- Nicknames: Czech Locomotive, Ťopek
- Born: 19 September 1922 Kopřivnice, Czechoslovakia
- Died: 21 November 2000 (aged 78) Prague, Czech Republic
- Height: 1.82 m (6 ft 0 in)
- Weight: 72 kg (159 lb)

Sport
- Sport: Long-distance running
- Club: TJ Gottwaldov, Zlín; Dukla Praha

Achievements and titles
- Personal bests: 5000 metres: 13:57.0; 10,000 metres: 28:54.2; Marathon: 2:23:04
Medal record
Men's athletics
Representing Czechoslovakia
Olympic Games
Gold medal – first place	1948 London	10,000 m
Gold medal – first place	1952 Helsinki	5000 m
Gold medal – first place	1952 Helsinki	10,000 m
Gold medal – first place	1952 Helsinki	Marathon
Silver medal – second place	1948 London	5000 m
European Championships
Gold medal – first place	1950 Brussels	5000 m
Gold medal – first place	1950 Brussels	10,000 m
Gold medal – first place	1954 Bern	10,000 m
Bronze medal – third place	1954 Bern	5000 m

Emil Zátopek (Czech: [ˈɛmɪl ˈzaːtopɛk]; 19 September 1922 – 21 November 2000) was a Czech long-distance runner who won three gold medals at the 1952 Summer Olympics in Helsinki. He came first in the 5,000 metres and 10,000 metres runs before he decided at the last minute to compete in the first marathon of his life, which he also won. Zátopek was nicknamed the "Czech Locomotive".

In 1954, Zátopek was the first runner to break the 29-minute barrier in the 10,000 metres. Three years earlier in 1951, he had broken the hour for running 20 km. He was considered one of the greatest runners of the 20th century and was also known for his brutally tough training methods. He popularised interval training after World War II.

Zátopek is the only person to win the 5,000 metres (24 July 1952), 10,000 metres (20 July 1952) and marathon (27 July 1952) in the same Olympic Games. In February 2013, the editors at Runner's World selected him as the greatest runner ever.

== Early years ==
Zátopek was born in Kopřivnice as the seventh child in a family of modest means. Aged 16, he began working at the Baťa shoe factory in Zlín. He recalled: "One day, the factory sports coach, who was very strict, pointed at four boys, including me, and ordered us to run in a race. I protested that I was weak and not fit to run, but the coach sent me for a physical examination, and the doctor said that I was perfectly well. So I had to run, and when I got started, I felt I wanted to win. But I only came in second. That was the way it started". Zátopek finished second in a field of 100. After that, he took up a serious interest in running by joining a local athletics club, where he developed his own training programme modelled on what he had read about the great Finnish Olympian Paavo Nurmi.

A mere four years later, in 1944, Zátopek broke the Czechoslovak records for 2,000, 3,000 and 5,000 metres. At the end of the war, he joined the Czechoslovak Army, became an officer and was gradually given more time for his gruelling training regimen.

== Competitions ==
Zátopek was selected for the Czechoslovak national team for the 1946 European Championships in Oslo and finished fifth in the 5,000 m in 14:25.8, breaking his own Czechoslovak record of 14:50.2. At the 1948 Summer Olympics in London, Zátopek won the 10,000 m and finished second behind Gaston Reiff from Belgium in the 5,000 m run in a driving rainstorm.

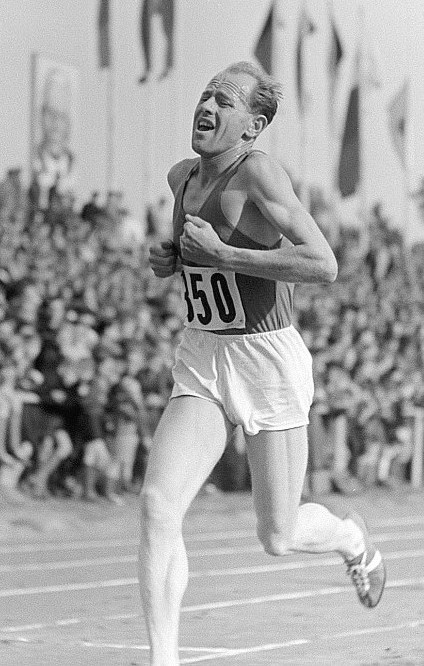
Zátopek displaying his trademark expression of pain (1951)

The following year, Zátopek broke the 10,000 m world record twice and went on to better his own record three times over the next four seasons. He also set records in the 5,000 m (1954), 20,000 m (twice in 1951), one-hour run (twice in 1951), 25,000 m (1952 and 1955) and 30,000 m (1952). He won the 5,000 m and 10,000 m at the 1950 European Championships and the 10,000 m at the next European Championships.

At the 1952 Summer Olympics in Helsinki, Zátopek won gold in the 5,000 m, 10,000 m and marathon, breaking Olympic records in each event. Zátopek is the only person to win these three long-distance events in the same Olympic Games. His victory in the 5,000 m came after a ferocious last lap in 57.5 seconds, during which he went from fourth place to first in the final turn, passing first Alain Mimoun of France, then Herbert Schade of West Germany and finally Chris Chataway of Great Britain. Zátopek's final medal came when he decided at the last minute to compete in the marathon for the first time; he won the race. His strategy for the marathon was simple: race alongside Jim Peters, the British world-record holder. After a punishing first fifteen kilometres, in which Peters knew he had overtaxed himself, Zátopek asked the Englishman what he thought of the race thus far. The astonished Peters told the Czech that the pace was "too slow", in an attempt to deceive Zátopek, at which point the latter simply accelerated away. Peters did not finish, while Zátopek won the race and set an Olympic record. Zátopek beat second-placed Reinaldo Gorno (Argentina) by 2:01 minutes.

Zátopek attempted to defend his marathon gold medal in 1956; however, he suffered a groin injury while training and was hospitalised for six weeks. He resumed training the day after leaving the hospital but never quite regained his form. He finished sixth in the marathon, which was won by his old rival and friend Alain Mimoun. Zátopek retired from competition in 1957.

Zátopek's running style was distinctive and very much at odds with what was considered to be efficient at the time. His head would often roll, face contorted with effort, while his torso swung from side to side. He often wheezed and panted audibly while running, which earned him the nicknames of "Emil the Terrible" or the "Czech Locomotive". When asked about his tortured facial expressions, Zátopek is said to have replied: "It isn't gymnastics or figure skating, you know". In addition, he would train in any weather, including snow, and would often do so while wearing heavy work boots as opposed to special running shoes. He was always willing to advise other runners. One example he often gave of how to be relaxed was to ensure that, while running, a person gently touched the tip of their thumb with the tip of an index or middle finger; that slight contact would ensure that arms and shoulders remained relaxed.

Records
Preceded by (Sweden) Gunder Hägg	Men's 5000 m world record holder 30 May 1954 – 29 August 1954	Succeeded by (Soviet Union) Vladimir Kuts
Preceded by (Finland) Viljo Heino	Men's 10000 m world record holder 11 June 1949 – 1 September 1949	Succeeded by (Finland) Viljo Heino
Preceded by (Finland) Viljo Heino	Men's 10000 m world record holder 22 October 1949 – 15 July 1956	Succeeded by (Hungary) Sándor Iharos
Preceded by (Finland) Viljo Heino	Men's one hour run world record holder 15 September 1951 – 24 August 1963	Succeeded by (New Zealand) Bill Baillie
Preceded by (Finland) Viljo Heino	Men's 20000 m world record holder 15 September 1951 – 24 August 1963	Succeeded by (New Zealand) Bill Baillie
Preceded by (Finland) Mikko Hietanen	Men's 25000 m world record holder 26 October 1952 – 27 September 1955	Succeeded by (Soviet Union) Albert Ivanov
Preceded by (Soviet Union) Albert Ivanov	Men's 25000 m world record holder 29 October 1955 – 21 July 1965	Succeeded by (United Kingdom) Ron Hill
Preceded by (Soviet Union) Yakov Moskachenkov	Men's 30000 m world record holder 26 October 1952 – 21 October 1956	Succeeded by (Finland) Antti Viskari

== Personal life ==
His wife Dana Zátopková (born the same day and year as her husband) won a gold medal in the javelin throw at the 1952 Olympics, only a few moments after Zátopek's victory in the 5,000 m. She also finished second at the 1960 Olympics. An example of the playful relationship between husband and wife came when he attempted to take some credit for his wife's Olympic victory: during her press conference, he claimed that his victory in the 5,000 m had "inspired" her. His wife's indignant response was: "Really? Okay, go inspire some other girl and see if she throws a javelin fifty metres!”

Zátopek was known for his friendly and gregarious personality and for his ability to speak six languages. He was regularly visited at his home in Prague by international athletes he had befriended at competitions. His British rival Gordon Pirie described his as "the merriest and gayest home I've been in".

Emil and Dana were the witnesses at the wedding ceremony of Olympic gold medalists Olga Fikotová and Harold Connolly in Prague in 1957, at the height of the Cold War. Zátopek had spoken to the Czechoslovak president Antonín Zápotocký to request help in getting national heroine Olga a permit to marry the American Connolly. The permit was received a few days later.

In 1966, Zátopek hosted the Australian Ron Clarke when he visited Prague for a race. Zátopek knew that while Clarke held many middle-distance track and field world records, he had failed to win an Olympic gold medal (including being beaten by Billy Mills in a major upset). At the end of the visit, Zátopek gave one of his gold medals from the 1952 Olympics to Clarke.

== Later years and death ==
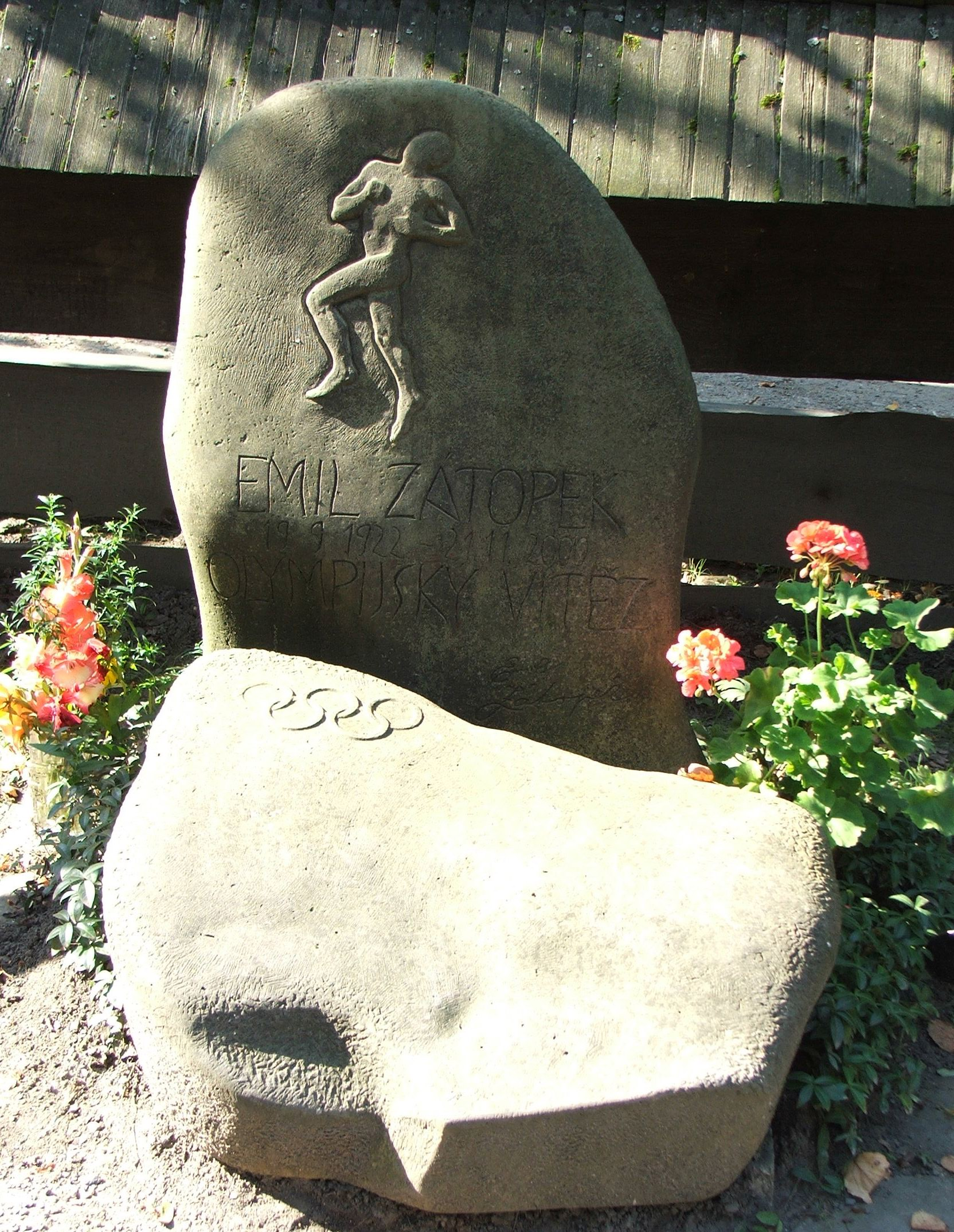
Grave of Emil Zátopek in Rožnov pod Radhoštěm

A hero in his native country, Zátopek was an influential figure in the Communist Party. However, he supported the party's democratic wing and, after the 1968 Prague Spring, was stripped of his rank and expelled from the army and the party, removed from all important positions and forced to work in a string of menial manual labour positions.

He gained employment in "Stavební Geologie", one of the few companies not discouraged from employing out-of-favour citizens, and worked prospecting for natural resources around Bohemia, being able to visit his wife in Prague only infrequently. His work in such a field gave rise to a rumour that he had been sent (as many before him were) to the uranium mine labour camps; however, the camps and the last of the mines had closed many years before. It is also rumoured that Zátopek had a short stint at refuse collection, but was let go as he was unable to complete a round without a horde of citizens insisting on helping him, though no evidence exists of this ever happening.

In 1977, after five years away from his wife and friends, Zátopek's spirit was broken; the communist government, no longer deeming him a threat, allowed him back to Prague with the offer of a further humiliating and menial job in the ČSTV (Czechoslovak Union of Physical Education). As the only option to get back to Prague and his wife, Zátopek accepted the offer. Using his gift as a linguist, ČSTV put him to work monitoring foreign publications for the latest developments in sports science and training techniques. It was a lowly job shuffling papers in a small office under Strahov Stadium. He dutifully served until his retirement in the early 1980s.

On 9 March 1990, Zátopek was rehabilitated by Václav Havel.

Zátopek died in Prague on 21 November 2000 at the age of 78, from the complications of a stroke. His funeral at Prague's National Theatre was crowded with leading figures from the international sports world.

Zátopek was awarded the Pierre de Coubertin medal (the "True Spirit of Sportsmanship" medal) in 1975. In 2012, he was named among the first twelve athletes to be inducted into the IAAF Hall of Fame. A life-size bronze statue of Zátopek was unveiled at the Stadium of Youth in Zlín in September 2014.

== In popular culture ==
The 2021 film Zátopek focuses on his personal life and sports career.

The most prestigious track race in Australia is named after him.

French writer Jean Echenoz published an updated biography of Zátopek titled Courir (Running).

A Bengali novel by Mati Nandi, Naran (নারান), mentioned him. In it he is the role model for the protagonist, a Bengali Hindu refugee from East Pakistan who relocated to Calcutta in 1947 to evade the religious onslaught and build up his life again from scratch.

The song "Czech Locomotive" by Australian psychedelic rock band Pond off of their album 9 is about him.

British punk-rock band Zatopeks chose their name after Emil Zátopek.

Škoda Transportation named its electric locomotive family 109E after him.
