= Bertil Albertsson =

Swedish long-distance runner

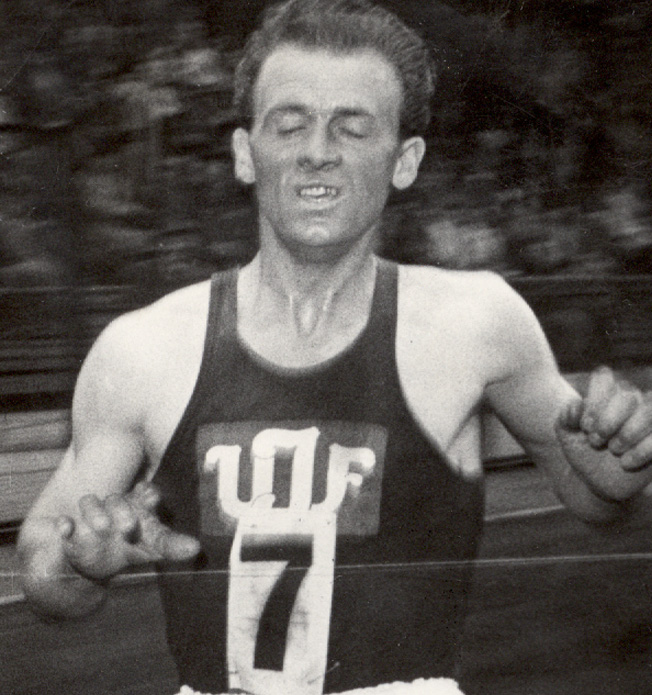

Personal information
- Born: 1 September 1921 Uppsala, Sweden
- Died: 3 March 2008 (aged 86) Upplands Väsby, Sweden
- Height: 177 cm (5 ft 10 in)
- Weight: 67 kg (148 lb)

Sport
- Sport: Athletics
- Event: 1500–10000 m
- Club: Upsala IF

Achievements and titles
- Personal best(s): 1500 m – 3.51.4 (1946); 5000 m – 14:15.0 (1952); 10000 m – 29:46.0 (1951)
Medal record
Representing Sweden
Olympic Games
Bronze medal – third place	1948 London	10000 m

Bertil Ebbe Gustaf Albertsson (1 September 1921 – 3 March 2008) was a Swedish runner. He competed in the 5000 m and 10000 m events at the 1948 and 1952 Olympics and finished in 3–12 place, winning a bronze medal in the 10000 m in 1948. Albertsson won eight national titles: in the 5000 m in 1947, 1949 and 1951–53, and in the 10000 m in 1948, 1950 and 1954.
