= Athletics at the 1956 Summer Olympics – Men's marathon =

Men's marathon 45km at the Games of the XVI Olympiad
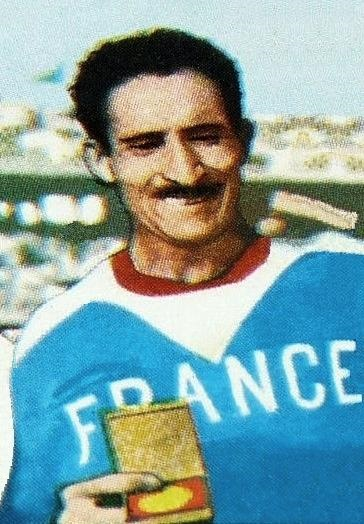
- Alain Mimoun, winner
- Venue: Melbourne Cricket Ground, Melbourne
- Dates: December 1, 1956
- Competitors: 46 from 23 nations
- Winning time: 2:25:00

Medalists
1st place, gold medalist(s)		Alain Mimoun; France
2nd place, silver medalist(s)		Franjo Mihalić; Yugoslavia
3rd place, bronze medalist(s)		Veikko Karvonen; Finland

The men's marathon at the 1956 Summer Olympics in Melbourne, Australia was held on Saturday December 1, 1956. There were 46 participants from 23 nations, with 13 runners not completing the race. The maximum number of athletes per nation had been set at 3 since the 1930 Olympic Congress. The event was won by 1 minute 32 seconds by Alain Mimoun of France, the nation's first Olympic marathon victory since 1928 and third overall. Yugoslavia took its first Olympic marathon medal with Franjo Mihalić's silver. Finland returned to the podium in the event for the first time since 1932 (the end of a four-Games medal streak for the nation) as Veikko Karvonen took bronze.

== Background ==
This was the 13th appearance of the event, which is one of 12 athletics events to have been held at every Summer Olympics. Returning runners from the 1952 marathon included defending champion Emil Zátopek of Czechoslovakia and fifth-place finisher Veikko Karvonen of Finland. Zátopek's primary challenger was Alain Mimoun of France, who had won three silver medals in the 5000 metres and 10000 metres track events in 1948 and 1952—all behind Zátopek. Mimoun was making his marathon debut. Zátopek, on the other hand, was still recovering from hernia surgery.

Burma, Ethiopia, Iran, Kenya, and New Zealand each made their first appearance in Olympic marathons; Germany appeared for the first time as the "United Team of Germany". The United States made its 13th appearance, the only nation to have competed in each Olympic marathon to that point.

== Competition format and course ==
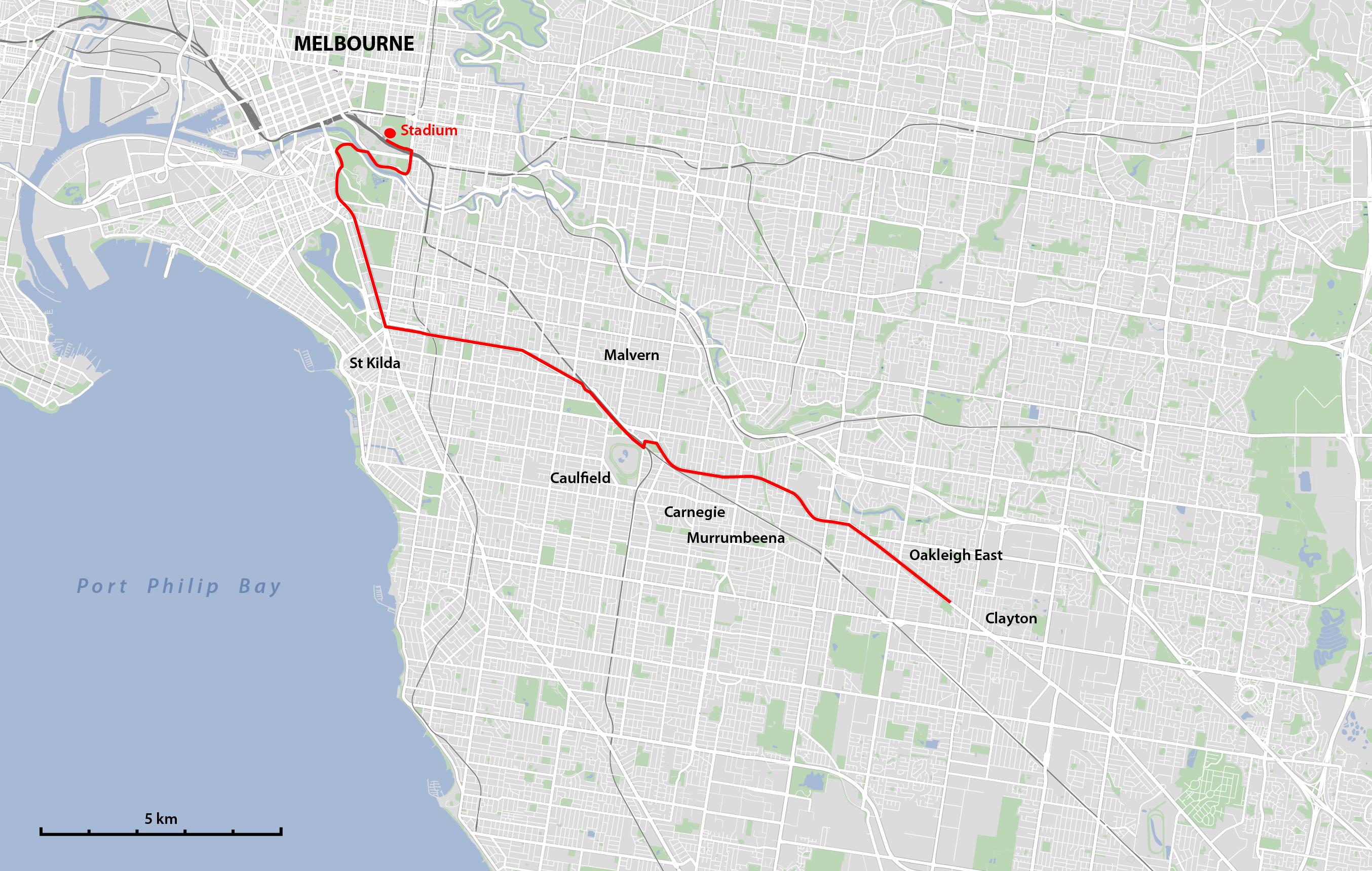
Map of marathon course

As all Olympic marathons, the competition was a single race. The marathon distance of 26 miles, 385 yards) was run over an out-and-back course, starting and finishing at the Olympic Stadium. Its eastern turning point was at the site of the Oakleigh Motel — Victoria's first motel, under construction at the time of the event.

== Records ==
These were the standing world and Olympic records prior to the 1956 Summer Olympics.

World record	Jim Peters (GBR)	2:17:39.4	London, United Kingdom	26 June 1954
Olympic record	Emil Zátopek (TCH)	2:23:03.2	Helsinki, Finland	27 July 1952

No new world or Olympic bests were set during the competition.

== Schedule ==
All times are Australian Eastern Standard Time (UTC+10)

Date	Time	Round
Saturday, 1 December 1956	15:15	Final

== Results ==
Rank	Athlete	Nation	Time
1st place, gold medalist(s)	Alain Mimoun	France	2:25:00
2nd place, silver medalist(s)	Franjo Mihalić	Yugoslavia	2:26:32
3rd place, bronze medalist(s)	Veikko Karvonen	Finland	2:27:47
4	Lee Chang-Hoon	South Korea	2:28:45
5	Yoshiaki Kawashima	Japan	2:29:19
6	Emil Zátopek	Czechoslovakia	2:29:34
7	Ivan Filin	Soviet Union	2:30:37
8	Evert Nyberg	Sweden	2:31:12
9	Thomas Nilsson	Sweden	2:33:33
10	Eino Oksanen	Finland	2:36:10
11	Arnold Vaide	Sweden	2:36:21
12	Choi Chunk-Sik	South Korea	2:36:53
13	Paavo Kotila	Finland	2:38:59
14	Mercer Davies	South Africa	2:39:48
15	Harry Hicks	Great Britain	2:39:55
16	Hideo Hamamura	Japan	2:40:53
17	Albert Richards	New Zealand	2:41:34
18	John Russell	Australia	2:41:44
19	Lothar Beckert	United Team of Germany	2:42:10
20	Nick Costes	United States	2:42:20
21	John J. Kelley	United States	2:43:40
22	Muhamad Havlidar Aslam	Pakistan	2:44:33
23	Adolf Gruber	Austria	2:46:20
24	Aurèle Vandendriessche	Belgium	2:47:18
25	Keith Ollerenshaw	Australia	2:48:12
26	Myitung Naw	Burma	2:49:32
27	Pavel Kantorek	Czechoslovakia	2:52:05
28	Kurt Hartung	United Team of Germany	2:52:14
29	Bashay Feleke	Ethiopia	2:53:37
30	Abdul Rashid	Pakistan	2:57:47
31	Kanuti Sum	Kenya	2:58:42
32	Gebre Birkay	Ethiopia	2:58:49
33	Kurao Hiroshima	Japan	3:04:17
—	Giuseppe Lavelli	Italy	DNF
—	Jan Barnard	South Africa	DNF
—	Ron Clark	Great Britain	DNF
—	Eduardo Fontecilla	Chile	DNF
—	Ali Baghbanbashi	Iran	DNF
—	Boris Grishayev	Soviet Union	DNF
—	Les Perry	Australia	DNF
—	Juan Silva	Chile	DNF
—	Albert Ivanov	Soviet Union	DNF
—	Klaus Porbadnik	United Team of Germany	DNF
—	Fred Norris	Great Britain	DNF
—	Im Hwa-dong	South Korea	DNF
—	Dean Thackwray	United States	DNF
—	Demissie Gamatcho	Ethiopia	DNS
—	Rudy Méndez	Puerto Rico	DNS
