= Athletics at the 1960 Summer Olympics – Men's marathon =

Men's marathon at the Games of the XVII Olympiad
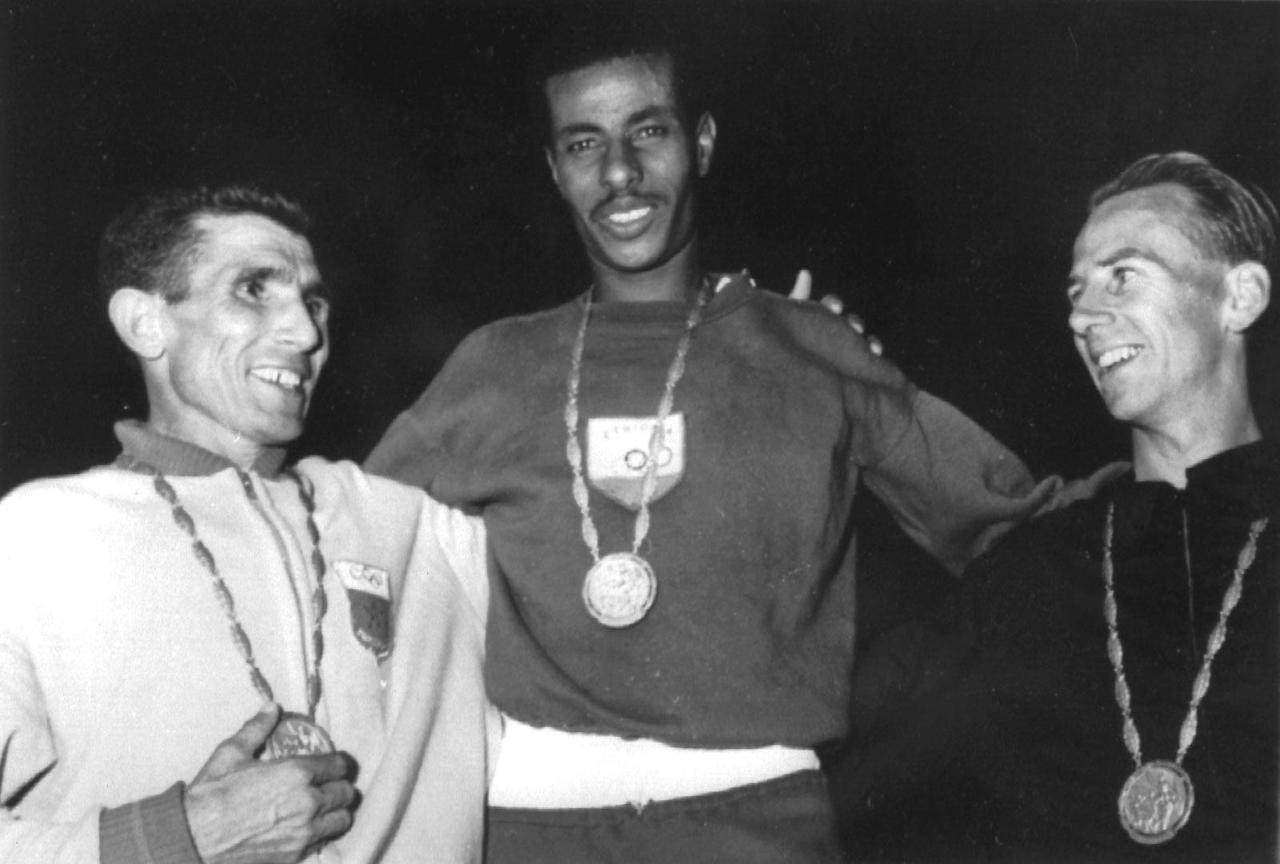
- Left-right: Rhadi Ben Abdesselam, Abebe Bikila, Barry Magee
- Venue: Arch of Constantine, Rome
- Dates: September 10, 1960
- Competitors: 69 from 35 nations
- Winning time: 2:15:16.2 WR

Medalists
1st place, gold medalist(s)		Abebe Bikila; Ethiopia
2nd place, silver medalist(s)		Rhadi Ben Abdesselam; Morocco
3rd place, bronze medalist(s)		Barry Magee; New Zealand

Official Video Marathon Highlights Video on YouTube

The men's marathon at the 1960 Summer Olympics in Rome, Italy, was held on Saturday September 10, 1960. There were 69 participants from 35 nations. The maximum number of athletes per nation had been set at 3 since the 1930 Olympic Congress. Abebe Bikila, who ran the race barefoot, finished in world record time and became the first sub-Saharan African to win an Olympic gold medal. All three of the medalists came from nations which had never before won an Olympic marathon medal. The winning margin was 25.4 seconds.

== Background ==
This was the 14th appearance of the event, which is one of 12 athletics events to have been held at every Summer Olympics. Returning runners from the 1956 marathon included gold medalist Alain Mimoun of France, silver medalist Franjo Mihalić of Yugoslavia, fourth-place finisher Lee Chang-hoon of South Korea, eighth-place finisher Evert Nyberg of Sweden, and tenth-place finisher Eino Oksanen of Finland. Sergei Popov of the Soviet Union, the world record holder and one of only two men (along with Jim Peters) to have run under 2 hours and 20 minutes, was favored.

Ceylon, Liberia, Morocco, and Tunisia each made their first appearance in Olympic marathons. The United States made its 14th appearance, the only nation to have competed in each Olympic marathon to that point.

== Competition format and course ==
The marathon distance of 26 miles, 385 yards was run over a point-to-point course; it was the first marathon to neither start nor end at the Olympic Stadium. The course started at the Piazza di Campidoglio. It was a triangular loop, running past many of the wonders of Ancient Roma. The course passed along the Caracalla Baths, ran down the Appian Way, and finished under the Arch of Constantine.

== Records ==
These were the standing world and Olympic records prior to the 1960 Summer Olympics.

World record	Sergei Popov (URS)	2:15:17.0	Stockholm, Sweden	24 August 1958
Olympic record	Emil Zátopek (TCH)	2:23:03.2	Helsinki, Finland	27 July 1952

Abebe Bikila set a new world record at 2:15:16.2; this record is still the record for barefoot running.

== Schedule ==
The 1960 marathon started so late that the course required torchlight for the runners to see. The last finisher arrived at nearly 9:15 p.m. local time.

All times are Central European Time (UTC+1)

Date	Time	Round
Saturday, 10 September 1960	17:30	Final

== Results ==
Rank	Athlete	Nation	Time	Notes
1st place, gold medalist(s)	Abebe Bikila	Ethiopia	2:15:16.2	WR
2nd place, silver medalist(s)	Rhadi Ben Abdesselam	Morocco	2:15:41.6	
3rd place, bronze medalist(s)	Barry Magee	New Zealand	2:17:18.2	
4	Konstantin Vorobyov	Soviet Union	2:19:09.6	
5	Sergey Popov	Soviet Union	2:19:18.8	
6	Thyge Thøgersen	Denmark	2:21:03.4	
7	Abebe Wakgira	Ethiopia	2:21:09.4	
8	Bakir Benaïssa	Morocco	2:21:21.4	
9	Osvaldo Suárez	Argentina	2:21:26.6	
10	Franjo Škrinjar	Yugoslavia	2:21:40.2	
11	Nikolay Rumyantsev	Soviet Union	2:21:49.4	
12	Franjo Mihalić	Yugoslavia	2:21:52.6	
13	Keith James	South Africa	2:22:58.6	
14	Pavel Kantorek	Czechoslovakia	2:22:59.8	
15	Gumersindo Gómez	Argentina	2:23:00.0	
16	Denis O'Gorman	Great Britain	2:24:16.2	
17	Miguel Navarro	Spain	2:24:17.4	
18	Jeff Julian	New Zealand	2:24:50.6	
19	John J. Kelley	United States	2:24:58.0	
20	Lee Chang-hoon	South Korea	2:25:02.2	
21	Arnold Vaide	Sweden	2:25:40.2	
22	Gerry McIntyre	Ireland	2:26:03.0	
23	Olavi Manninen	Finland	2:26:33.0	
24	Eino Oksanen	Finland	2:26:38.0	
25	Arthur Keily	Great Britain	2:27:00.0	
26	Tor Torgersen	Norway	2:27:30.0	
27	Myitung Naw	Burma	2:28:17.0	
28	Bruno Bartholome	United Team of Germany	2:28:39.0	
29	Brian Kilby	Great Britain	2:28:55.0	
30	Alex Breckenridge	United States	2:29:38.0	
31	Kurao Hiroshima	Japan	2:29:40.0	
32	Kazumi Watanabe	Japan	2:29:45.0	
33	Juan Silva	Chile	2:31:18.0	
34	Alain Mimoun	France	2:31:20.0	
35	Paul Genève	France	2:31:20.0	
36	Frans Künen	Netherlands	2:31:25.0	
37	Francesco Perrone	Italy	2:31:32.0	
38	Silvio De Florentis	Italy	2:31:54.0	
39	Linus Diaz	Ceylon	2:32:12.0	
40	Lal Chand	India	2:32:13.0	
41	Johannes Lauridsen	Denmark	2:32:32.0	
42	Willie Dunne	Ireland	2:33:08.0	
43	Ian Sinfield	Australia	2:34:16.0	
44	Arthur Wittwer	Switzerland	2:34:42.2	
45	Jagmal Singh	India	2:35:01.0	
46	Nobuyoshi Sadanaga	Japan	2:35:11.0	
47	Lee Sang-cheol	South Korea	2:35:14.0	
48	Gordon McKenzie	United States	2:35:16.0	
49	Ahmed Labidi	Tunisia	2:35:43.0	
50	Walter Lemos	Argentina	2:36:55.0	
51	Ray Puckett	New Zealand	2:37:36.0	
52	Dolfi Gruber	Austria	2:37:40.0	
53	Antti Viskari	Finland	2:38:06.0	
54	Allan Lawrence	Australia	2:38:46.0	
55	Gordon Dickson	Canada	2:38:46.0	
56	Lothar Beckert	United Team of Germany	2:40:10.0	
57	Günter Havenstein	United Team of Germany	2:41:14.0	
58	Evert Nyberg	Sweden	2:42:59.0	
59	Arap Sum Kanuti	Kenya	2:46:55.2	
60	Ranjit Bhatia	India	2:57:06.0	
61	Allal Saoudi	Morocco	2:59:41.0	
62	Alifu Massaquoi	Liberia	3:43:18.0	
—	Hedi Dhaoui	Tunisia	DNF	
—	Vito Di Terlizzi	Italy	DNF	
—	Mouldi Essalhi	Tunisia	DNF	
—	Gerhart Hecker	Hungary	DNF	
—	Kim Yeon-beom	South Korea	DNF	
—	Bertie Messitt	Ireland	DNF	
—	Aurèle Vandendriessche	Belgium	DNF	
—	Constantin Grecescu	Romania	DNS	
—	Erik Östbye	Sweden	DNS	
—	Dave Power	Australia	DNS	
—	Tadeusz Starzyński-Starybrat	Poland	DNS	
—	Cyprian Tseriwa	Zimbabwe	DNS	
