= 1958 European Athletics Championships – Men's marathon =

Men's marathon at the European Athletics Championships

The men's marathon at the 1958 European Athletics Championships was held in Stockholm, Sweden, at Stockholms Olympiastadion on 24 August 1958.

== Medalists ==
Gold	Sergey Popov; Soviet Union
Silver	Ivan Filin; Soviet Union
Bronze	Fred Norris; Great Britain

== Results ==
=== Final ===
24 August

Rank	Name	Nationality	Time	Notes
1st place, gold medalist(s)	Sergey Popov	Soviet Union	2:15:17.0	CR
2nd place, silver medalist(s)	Ivan Filin	Soviet Union	2:20:50.6	
3rd place, bronze medalist(s)	Fred Norris	Great Britain	2:21:15.0	
4	Peter Wilkinson	Great Britain	2:21:40.0	
5	Lothar Beckert	East Germany	2:22:11.2	
6	Veikko Karvonen	Finland	2:22:45.8	
7	Arnold Vaide	Sweden	2:25:54.2	
8	Edoardo Righi	Italy	2:26:52.0	
9	Jürgen Wedeking	West Germany	2:27:57.0	
10	Eino Pulkkinen	Finland	2:28:35.4	
11	Aurèle Vandendriessche	Belgium	2:30:26.0	
12	Thomas Nilsson	Sweden	2:31:04.2	
13	Vito di Terlizzi	Italy	2:31:09.0	
14	José Araujo	Portugal	2:31:18.4	
15	Franjo Škrinjar	Yugoslavia	2:32:58.4	
16	Adolf Gruber	Austria	2:34:09.8	
17	Paul Genève	France	2:35:20.4	
18	Victor Olsen	Norway	2:35:50.0	
19	Artur Wittwer	Switzerland	2:36:13.8	
20	Miguel Navarro	Spain	2:38:10.0	
21	Cornelius Bleeker	Netherlands	2:38:45.6	
22	Arthur Hansen	Denmark	2:41:57.2	
	Franjo Mihalić	Yugoslavia	DNF	
	Alain Mimoun	France	DNF	
	Finn Systad	Norway	DNF	

== Participation ==
According to an unofficial count, 25 athletes from 17 countries participated in the event.

- Austria (1)
- Belgium (1)
- Denmark (1)
- East Germany (1)
- Finland (2)
- France (2)
- Italy (2)
- Netherlands (1)
- Norway (2)
- Portugal (1)
- Soviet Union (2)
- Spain (1)
- Sweden (2)
- Switzerland (1)
- Great Britain (2)
- West Germany (1)
- Yugoslavia (2)
