= South Korea at the 1960 Summer Olympics =

- IOC code: KOR (COR used at these Games)
- NOC: Korean Olympic Committee

in Rome
- Competitors: 35 in 9 sports
- Medals: Gold 0 Silver 0 Bronze 0 Total 0

Summer Olympics appearances (overview)
- 1948; 1952; 1956; 1960; 1964; 1968; 1972; 1976; 1980; 1984; 1988; 1992; 1996; 2000; 2004; 2008; 2012; 2016; 2020; 2024

South Korea, as Korea, competed at the 1960 Summer Olympics in Rome, Italy. 35 competitors, 33 men and 2 women, took part in 38 events in 9 sports.

== Athletics ==
=== Track and road ===
Event	Athletes	First round / Heat		Second round		Semifinal		Final	
Event	Athletes	Result	Rank	Result	Rank	Result	Rank	Result	Rank
Men's 100 m	Kim Jong-Cheol	11.5	6 (H5)	Did not advance					
Men's marathon	Lee Chang-Hoon							2:25:02	20
Men's marathon	Lee Sang-Cheol							2:35:14	47
Men's marathon	Kim Yeon-Beom							Did not finish	-
Women's 800 m	Lee Hak-ja	2:28.4	7 (H1)					Did not advance	

=== Field ===
Event	Athletes	Qualification		Final	
Event	Athletes	Result (m)	Rank	Result	Rank
Men's long jump	Seo Yeong-Ju	6.98	34	Did not advance	

== Boxing ==
Athlete	Event	Round 1	Round 2	Round 3	Quarterfinals	Semifinals	Final	
Athlete	Event	Opposition Result	Opposition Result	Opposition Result	Opposition Result	Opposition Result	Opposition Result	Rank
Jeong Sin-Jo	Flyweight	–	Sivko (URS); L by 0-5	N/A	Did not advance			17
Kang Chun-Won	Bantamweight	–	Armstrong (USA); L by 1-4	N/A	Did not advance			17
Song Sun-Cheon	Featherweight	Okezie (NGR); W by 3-2	Musso (ITA); L by 0-5	N/A	Did not advance			9
Lee Gwang-Ju	Lightweight	–	Stoilov (BUL); W by 3-1-1	Campbell (USA); L by KO	Did not advance			9
Kim Deuk-Bong	Light-Welterweight	Mongkolrit (THA); W by KO	Sarrazin (CAN); W by DQ	Amarista (VEN); W by referee's stop	Quartey (GHA); L by 1-1-3	Did not advance		5
Kim Ki-Soo	Welterweight	–	Perry (IRL); W by 3-2	Benvenuti (ITA); L by 0-5	Did not advance			9

== Cycling ==
=== Road Competition ===
Athlete	Event	Time	Rank
Jo Jae-hyeon	Individual road race	Did not finish	-
Lee Seung-hun	Individual road race	Did not finish	-
No Do-cheon	Individual road race	Did not finish	-
Pak Jong-hyeon	Individual road race	Did not finish	-

=== Track Competition ===
Athlete	Event	Time	Rank
Jo Jae-hyeon; Lee Seung-hun; No Do-cheon; Pak Jong-hyeon	Team time trial	2:53:59	30

== Diving ==
Athlete	Event	Qualifying		Semifinal		Final	
Athlete	Event	Points	Rank	Points	Rank	Points	Rank
Lee Pil-Jung	Men's 10 metre platform	28.34	28	Did not advance			

== Equestrian ==
Show Jumping

Athlete	Round 1		Round 2		Final	
Athlete	Penalties	Rank	Penalties	Rank	Penalties	Rank
Kim Dong-Gyu	Did not finish	-	Did not advance			
Min Gwan-Gi	Did not finish	-	Did not advance			

== Gymnastics ==
Men

Athlete	Event	Apparatus						Qualification		Final	
Athlete	Event	Floor	Pommel horse	Rings	Vault	Parallel bars	Horizontal bar	Total	Rank	Total	Rank
Kim Sang-Guk	All-around	17.80	15.20	18.40	17.65	17.95	17.55	104.55	88	Did not advance	
Kim Sang-Guk	Floor	17.80	N/A					17.80	=77	Did not advance	
Kim Sang-Guk	Pommel horse	N/A	15.20	N/A				15.20	109	Did not advance	
Kim Sang-Guk	Rings	N/A		18.40	N/A			18.40	=46	Did not advance	
Kim Sang-Guk	Vault	N/A			17.65	N/A		17.65	=81	Did not advance	
Kim Sang-Guk	Parallel bars	N/A				17.95	N/A	17.95	=70	Did not advance	
Kim Sang-Guk	Horizontal bar	N/A					17.55	17.55	=87	Did not advance	

Women

Athlete	Event	Apparatus				Qualification		Final	
Athlete	Event	Floor	Vault	Uneven bars	Balance beam	Total	Rank	Total	Rank
Yu Myeong-Ja	All-around	18.033	16.666	17.266	15.166	67.131	88	Did not advance	
Yu Myeong-Ja	Floor	18.033	N/A			18.033	70	Did not advance	
Yu Myeong-Ja	Vault	N/A	16.666	N/A		16.666	81	Did not advance	
Yu Myeong-Ja	Uneven bars	N/A		17.266	N/A	17.266	81	Did not advance	
Yu Myeong-Ja	Balance beam	N/A			15.166	15.166	=102	Did not advance	

== Shooting ==
Three shooters represented South Korea in 1960.

Men

Athlete	Event	Final	
Athlete	Event	Points	Rank
An Jae-song	50 m pistol	520	42
Sim Myeong-hui	Trap	NQ	46
Sim Mun-seop	25 m pistol	552	44
