= Veikko Karvonen =

Finnish long-distance runner

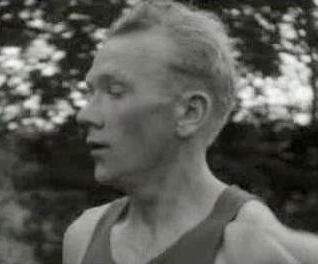
- Karvonen in 1951

Personal information
- Full name: Veikko Leo Karvonen
- Nationality: Finnish
- Born: 5 January 1926 Sakkola, Finland
- Died: 1 August 2007 (aged 81) Turku, Finland
- Height: 1.65 m (5 ft 5 in)
- Weight: 54 kg (119 lb; 8.5 st)

Sport
- Country: Finland
- Sport: Athletics
- Event: Marathon
- Club: Turun Urheiluliitto 1951–59

Achievements and titles
- Personal best: 2:18:57 (1956)
Medal record
Men's athletics
Representing Finland
Olympic Games
Bronze medal – third place	1956 Melbourne	Marathon
European Championships
Gold medal – first place	1954 Bern	Marathon
Silver medal – second place	1950 Brussels	Marathon

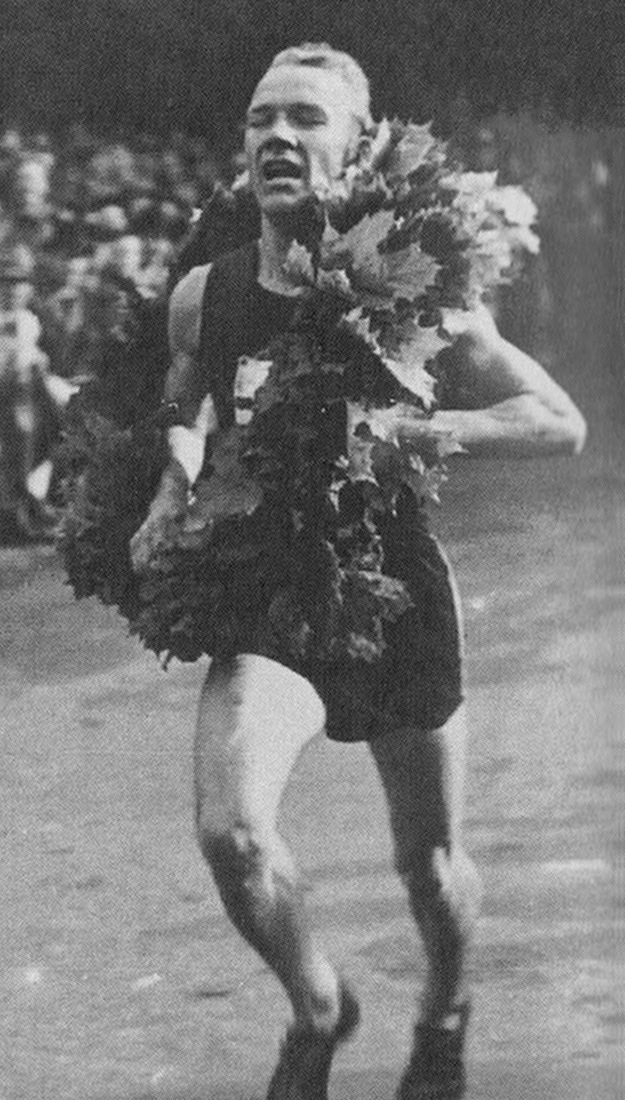
Veikko Karvonen

Veikko Leo Karvonen (5 January 1926 – 1 August 2007) was a Finnish long-distance runner who mainly competed in the marathon. He won the bronze medal in the marathon at the 1956 Summer Olympics. At the 1954 European Championships he won the gold medal in the marathon and the following year won the Boston Marathon.

== Career ==
Karvonen was born in Sakkola, a small Karelian town that then belonged to Finland but was invaded by the Soviet Union during World War II. Karvonen was evacuated to Saarijärvi, where he started his running career training with Jussi Kurikkala. He ran his first marathon in autumn 1949 in Turku with the promising result of 2:45:07.

Karvonen participated in the 1950 European Championships in Brussels. He finished second in the marathon 32 seconds after the winner Jack Holden. In the Track & Field News annual world ranking he was the second best marathon runner of 1950, after Holden.

In 1951 Karvonen ran three marathons and won all of them. In the Finnish Championship marathon in July his winning time was 2:28:46. In August in the Nordic Championship marathon he ran 2:28:07. In September he won the Enschede Marathon by over six minutes' margin before Tom Richards, Karvonen's winning time was 2:29:02. In 1951 Karvonen was ranked as the best marathon runner by the Track & Field News.

Karvonen trained hard for the 1952 Summer Olympics, which were in Helsinki, the capital of his home country, Finland. In spring 1952 he was at the training camp in Dinan when he suddenly started to suffer from back pain, which was diagnosed as a stress reaction of the intervertebral disc. As a result, he was forced to quit running for six weeks. Consequently, Karvonen was only sixth in the Finnish Championship marathon on the Olympic course of Helsinki on 22 June. However, he was nominated to the Finnish Olympic team. Karvonen rewarded his supporters at the Olympic marathon by finishing fifth with the time 2:26:41, three and half minutes after the Olympic champion Emil Zátopek. Karvonen was also ranked fifth by the Track & Field News.

In 1953 Karvonen finished second in the Boston Marathon. In this race he broke the 2:20 barrier for the first time; however the course was later found to be too short. In August Karvonen won silver medal at the Finnish Championship marathon and in September won a gold medal at the Nordic Championship marathon. In October he competed against Jim Peters in his home town of Turku. Peters improved his world record by six seconds to 2:18:35 and beat Karvonen by over seven minutes. In the 1953 Track & Field News world ranking Karvonen was third.

Karvonen did not gave up after his disappointment in Turku. In the following year's Boston Marathon he followed Peters until he took the lead before the 30 km mark. Peters dropped from his pace at the course's Heartbreak Hill and Karvonen took his most memorable victory in 2:20:39. Peters finished in 2:22:40. At the 1954 European Championships in Brussels Karvonen, Boris Grishayev, and Ivan Filin competed for the victory. Filin led by twenty meters when arriving first in the stadium. To his misfortune, he turned in the wrong direction on the track and missed victory. In the stadium Karvonen realized Filin's situation and ran for the gold medal before Grishayev and the disappointed Filin. Because of Filin's misfortune, Karvonen did not fully appreciate his championship. In 1954 Karvonen ran altogether five marathons within eight months and ranked first in the Track & Field News annual world ranking.

In August 1955 Karvonen was second in the Finnish Championship marathon, four minutes after Paavo Kotila. For the rest of the year Karvonen did not lose any race; in September he won Nordic Championship marathon, in October he was first in the Athens Peace Marathon, and finally he won the Fukuoka Marathon in December. For the second year in a row he was ranked as world's best marathon runner by the Track & Field News.

In August 1956 Finnish Championship marathon Karvonen was only third after Paavo Kotila and Eino Oksanen. However, in that race he ran his personal best 2:18:56, which remained his record until the end of his career. However, in the Olympics marathon Karvonen was the best Finn and overall third-place finisher. Twelve kilometers before the finish line, Karvonen was still in second position after Alain Mimoun. The race was run in very hot conditions and later Karvonen admitted it as the most painful race of his career. Karvonen suffered in the last kilometers, but only Franjo Mihalić was able to pass him. It took months until Karvonen fully recovered from the race. In 1956 Karvonen was ranked third by the Track & Field News.

At the 1957 Boston Marathon, Karvonen was second after John J. Kelley, a young American, who beat Karvonen by almost four minutes. The New York Times reported that midway through the race, Karvonen was clutching his side and seemed to have a stitch. Karvonen was still sixth at the 1958 European Championships with his all-time third best time, 2:22:45, second at the 1958 Fukuoka Marathon, and fourth at the 1959 Boston Marathon. During his career Karvonen ran a total of 35 marathons and won 15 of them.

== See also ==
- List of Olympic medalists in athletics (men)
- List of winners of the Boston Marathon
- List of European Athletics Championships medalists (men)
- Marathons at the Olympics
