= Polytechnic Marathon =

British athletics event

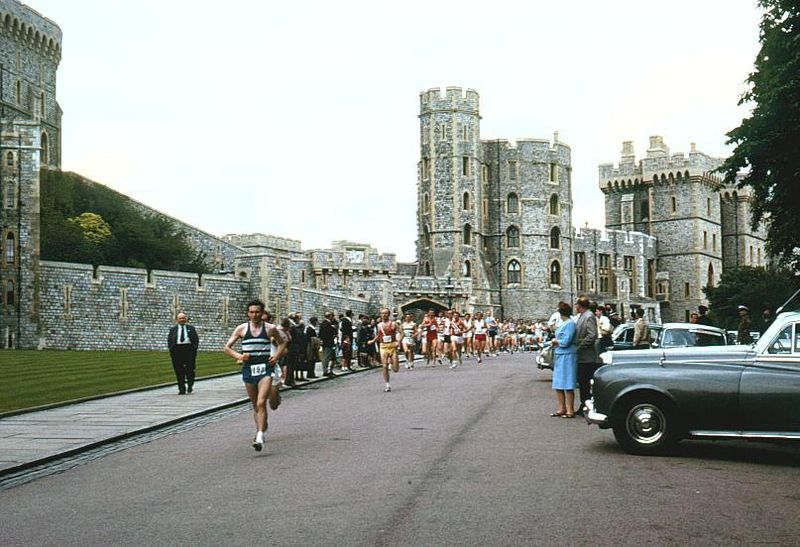
- Start of the 1967 Polytechnic Marathon at Windsor Castle
- Location: London
- Distance: marathon
- Established: 1909
- Last held: 1996

The Polytechnic Marathon, often called the Poly, was a marathon held annually between 1909 and 1996, over various courses in or near London. It was the first marathon to be run regularly over the distance of 26 miles, 385 yards which is now the global standard. A total of eight world marathon bests were set in the Poly, including the first authenticated time under 2 hours, 20 minutes which had been regarded as the marathon equivalent of the four-minute mile. At the time of its demise in 1996, the Poly was Europe's oldest regular marathon. It had seen more world records and had been run over 42.195 kilometres (26.219 mi) more often than any other marathon.

== Origin ==
The Polytechnic Marathon had its origins in the marathon of the 1908 Summer Olympics, held in London. This race was organised by the Polytechnic Harriers, the athletics club of the London Polytechnic at Regent Street (now the University of Westminster). In those days, there was no set distance for the marathon; it was simply a long race, around 40 km (25 mi) in length. The Polytechnic Harriers decided to start the Olympic marathon in front of the Royal apartments at Windsor Castle and end it on the track at White City Stadium in front of the Royal Box, a distance that turned out to be 26 miles, 385 yards.

There was immense public interest in the 1908 Olympic race, with its dramatic finish in which Dorando Pietri of Italy entered the stadium well clear of the field and staggered around the last lap to the finish line—only to be disqualified for receiving assistance. Building on this interest, The Sporting Life newspaper offered a magnificent trophy for an annual international marathon that would be second in importance only to the Olympic event itself. The Polytechnic Harriers were again asked to organise the event, and the Polytechnic Marathon was born.

== Early races ==
The first Polytechnic Marathon was held on 8 May 1909. Henry Barrett won, followed by Fred Lord, and Harry Green.

As with the Olympic race, the start was at Windsor Castle and the course was 26 miles, 385 yards; this distance was adopted as the international standard for marathons in 1924. (The older Boston Marathon, founded in 1897, adopted the 42.195-kilometre (26.219 mi) distance in 1924, but was slightly short for the first three years and was shorter still from 1951 to 1956.)

Over the years, the route of the Poly Marathon varied. From 1909 until 1932, it ended at Stamford Bridge in west London; then in 1933, it moved back to the White City stadium, where the 1908 Olympic marathon had finished. From 1938, the race ended at the new Polytechnic Harriers stadium in Chiswick, west London. It was on this course that Jim Peters, the greatest marathoner of his day, broke the 2 hours and 20 minutes barrier in 1953. Even more remarkably, remeasurement showed the course to have been about 150 yards too long.

In 1961, The Sporting Life withdrew its sponsorship, having ceased to report on athletics. A new sponsor was found in the form of confectionery company Callard and Bowser; and in the next few years, the race went from strength to strength, with a succession of world records (see table).

== Decline and fall ==
By 1970, the Polytechnic Harriers and the Poly Marathon were in decline. Traffic problems made it difficult to continue with the Windsor-to-Chiswick route, and from 1973 until 1992, the race was restricted to the Windsor area. Performances declined, and so did the status of the Poly Marathon. With the introduction of mass marathons and big-money events elsewhere, the Poly Marathon could not compete.

There were organizational changes, too. In 1985, the Polytechnic Harriers merged with Kingston AC and moved in with them at Kingsmeadow Stadium in Kingston, Surrey. Some ex-Polytechnic Harriers remained at the Polytechnic sports ground in Hartington Road, Chiswick, where they formed a new club—West 4 Harriers—which was to become involved with the Polytechnic Marathon some years later.

Management of the race passed to the London Road Runners Club (LRRC) for 1986 and 1987, but the LRRC then folded. After a four-year gap, the race was revived in 1992 by Capital Road Runners (an even shorter-lived successor to LRRC) in conjunction with West 4 Harriers. A revised route was introduced, from Windsor to the Polytechnic stadium at Chiswick, recalling the event's former glory days.

From 1993 to 1995, the Poly Marathon was organised by a group from West 4 Harriers. In 1996, responsibility passed to a commercial events organiser, but increased traffic and other difficulties made it impossible to keep the race going beyond 1996.

== World records ==
World records set in the Polytechnic Marathon.

| Date | Athlete | Time |
|---|---|---|
| 1909 May 8 ^{(see note 1)} | Henry Barrett (GBR) | 2:42:31.0 |
| 1913 May 31 | Alexis Ahlgren (SWE) | 2:36:06.6 |
| 1952 June 14 | Jim Peters (GBR) | 2:20:42.2 |
| 1953 June 13 | Jim Peters (GBR) | 2:18:40.2 ^{(see note 2)} |
| 1954 June 26 | Jim Peters (GBR ) | 2:17:39.4 |
| 1963 June 15 | Leonard "Buddy" Edelen (USA) | 2:14:28 |
| 1964 June 13 | Basil Heatley (GBR) | 2:13:55.0 |
| 1965 June 12 | Morio Shigematsu (JPN) | 2:12:00.0 |

Note 1: Date wrongly given as 26 May in some sources. Note 2: Distance measured as 42.337 km.

== Past winners ==
=== Men ===
| Year | Winner | Club | Time | Notes |
|---|---|---|---|---|
| 1909 | Henry Barrett | Polytechnic Harriers | 2.42.31 | WR |
1910 No race owing to the death of HM The King
| 1911 | Harry Green | Herne Hill Harriers | 2.46.29 & 4/5ths | |
| 1912 | (Canada) Jim Corkery | Canada | 2.36.55 & 2/5ths | |
| 1913 | (Sweden) Alexis Ahlgren | Sweden | 2.36.06 & 3/5ths | WR |
| 1914 | (France) Ahmed Djebellia | France | 2.46.30 & 4/5ths | |
1915-1918 No races during World War I
| 1919 | Edward Woolston | Machine Gun Corps | 2.52.30 & 1/5th | |
| 1920 | Bobby Mills | Leicester H | 2.37.40 & 2/5ths | |
| 1921 | Bobby Mills | Leicester H | 2.51.00 & 2/5ths | |
| 1922 | Bobby Mills | Leicester H | 2.47.30 & 2/5ths | |
| 1923 | (Denmark) Axel Jensen | Denmark | 2.40.46 & 4/5ths | |
| 1924 | (Scotland) Dunky Wright | Scotland | 2.53.17 & 2/5ths | |
| 1925 | (Northern Ireland) Sam Ferris | Royal Air Force | 2.35.58 & 1/5th | |
| 1926 | (Northern Ireland) Sam Ferris | Royal Air Force | 2.42.24 & 1/5th | |
| 1927 | (Northern Ireland) Sam Ferris | Royal Air Force | 2.40.32 & 1/5th | |
| 1928 | (Northern Ireland) Sam Ferris | Royal Air Force | 2.41.02 & 1/5th | |
| 1929 | (Northern Ireland) Sam Ferris | Royal Air Force | 2.40.47 & 2/5ths | |
| 1930 | Stan Smith | Birchfield Harriers | 2.41.55 | |
| 1931 | (Northern Ireland) Sam Ferris | Royal Air Force | 2.35.31 & 4/5ths | |
| 1932 | (Northern Ireland) Sam Ferris | Royal Air Force | 2.36.32 & 2/5ths | |
| 1933 | (Northern Ireland) Sam Ferris | Royal Air Force | 2.42.24 | |
| 1934 | (Scotland) Dunky Wright | Scotland | 2.56.30 | |
| 1935 | Bert Norris | Polytechnic Harriers | 2.48.37 | |
| 1936 | Bert Norris | Polytechnic Harriers | 2.35.20 | |
| 1937 | Bert Norris | Polytechnic Harriers | 2.48.40 | |
| 1938 | (Sweden) Henri Palme | Sweden | 2.42.00 | |
| 1939 | (Sweden) Henri Palme | Sweden | 2.36.56 | |
| 1940 | Leslie Griffiths | Herne Hill Harriers | 2.53.41 | |
| 1941 | Gerry Humphreys | Woodford Green AC | 3.12.36 | |
| 1942 | Leslie Griffiths | Reading AC | 2.53.56 | |
| 1943 | Leslie Griffiths | Reading AC | 2.53.14 | |
| 1944 | (Wales) Tom Richards | Mitcham AC | 2.48.45 | |
| 1945 | (Wales) Tom Richards | Mitcham AC | 2.56.39 | |
| 1946 | Harry Oliver | Reading AC | 2.38.12 | |
| 1947 | Cecil Ballard | Surrey AC | 2.36.52 | |
| 1948 | Jack Holden | Tipton Harriers | 2.36.44 | |
| 1949 | Jack Holden | Tipton Harriers | 2.42.52 | |
| 1950 | Jack Holden | Tipton Harriers | 2.33.07 | |
| 1951 | Jim Peters | Essex Beagles | 2.29.24 | |
| 1952 | Jim Peters | Essex Beagles | 2.20.42 | WR |
| 1953 | Jim Peters | Essex Beagles | 2.18.40 | WR |
| 1954 | Jim Peters | Essex Beagles | 2.17.39 | WR |
| 1955 | Bill McMinnis | Royal Air Force | 2.36.23 | |
| 1956 | Ron Clark | Herne Hill Harriers | 2.20.16 | |
| 1957 | Eddie Kirkup | Rotherham H | 2.37.04.4 | |
| 1958 | Colin Kemball | Wolverhampton H | 2.22.27 | |
| 1959 | (Republic of Ireland) Denis O'Gorman | St Albans AC | 2.25.11 | |
| 1960 | Arthur Keily | Derby & County AC | 2.19.06 | |
| 1961 | Peter Wilkinson | Derby & County AC | 2.20.25 | |
| 1962 | Ron Hill | Bolton United AC | 2.20.59 | |
| 1963 | (United States) Buddy Edelen | Hadleigh Olympiads AC & USA | 2.14.28 | WR |
| 1964 | Basil Heatley | Coventry Godiva Harriers | 2.13.55 | WR |
| 1965 | (Japan) Morio Shigematsu | Japan | 2.12.00 | WR |
| 1966 | Graham Taylor | Cambridge Harriers | 2.19.04 | |
| 1967 | (Scotland) Fergus Murray | Oxford University AC | 2.19.06 | |
| 1968 | (Japan) Kenji Kimihara | Japan | 2.15.15 | |
| 1969 | Phil Hampton | Royal Navy AC South | 2.25.22 | |
| 1970 | Don Faircloth | Croydon Harriers | 2.18.15 | |
| 1971 | Phil Hampton | Royal Navy AC South | 2.18.31 | |
| 1972 | Don Faircloth | Croydon Harriers | 2.31.52 | |
| 1973 | Robert Sercombe | Newport H | 2.19.48 | |
| 1974 | (Japan) Akio Usami | Japan | 2.15.16 | |
No race in 1975
| 1976 | Bernie Plain | Cardiff AAC | 2.15.43 | |
| 1977 | Ian Thompson | Luton AC | 2.14.32 | |
| 1978 | David Francis | Westbury H | 2.19.05 | |
| 1979 | Mike Gratton | Invicta AC | 2.19.53 | |
| 1980 | Tony Byrne | Salford Harriers | 2.22.23 | |
| 1981 | Bernie Plain | Cardiff AAC | 2.24.07 | |
| 1982 | Graham Ellis | Holmfirth H | 2.23.28 | |
| 1983 | Alan McGee | Southampton & Eastleigh AAC | 2.22.55 | |
| 1984 | David Catlow | Cheltenham H | 2.26.02 | |
| 1985 | Terry Donaghy | London Road Runners | 2.33.02 | |
| 1986 | (Wales) Hugh Jones | Ranelagh H | 2.26.11 | |
| 1987 | Mick McGeoch | Les Croupiers | 2.28.49 | |
No races from 1988 to 1991
| 1992 | (Wales) Hugh Jones | Ranelagh H | 2.22.58 | |
| 1993 | Jonathan Hooper | Bridgend AC | 2.25.55 | |
| 1994 | Chris Buckley | Westbury H | 2.21.57 | |
| 1995 | (Russia) Valery Zolotkov | Russia | 2.20.46 | |
| 1996 | (Belgium) Marc Verrdytt | Belgium | 2.23.43 | |

=== Women ===
| Year | Winner | Club | Time | Notes |
|---|---|---|---|---|
| 1978 | Gillian Adams | Aldershot, Farnham & District AC | 2.54.11 | |
| 1979 | Jane Davies | Epsom & Ewell H | 3.21.23 | |
| 1980 | Gillian Adams | Aldershot, Farnham & District AC | 2.45.11 | |
| 1981 | Caroline Rodgers | Highgate Harriers | 2.51.03 | |
| 1982 | Kath Binns | Sale Harriers | 2.36.12 | |
| 1983 | Val Howe | Bracknell AC | 3.05.39 | |
| 1984 | Sarah Foster | Woking AC | 2.50.00 | |
| 1985 | Pamela Davies | Belgrave Harriers | 3.22.28 | |
| 1986 | Frances Guy | Belgrave Harriers | 2.51.15 | |
| 1987 | Christine Gray | Portsmouth J | 3.18.50 | |
No races from 1988 to 1991
| 1992 | Karen Bowler | Hailsham H | 3.08.28 | |
| 1993 | Elaine Flather | Southampton RRC | 2.51.21 | |
| 1994 | Elaine Flather | Southampton RRC | 2.51.51 | |
| 1995 | Eryl Davies | Bridgend AC | 2.49.23 | |
| 1996 | Helen Grimshaw | Hounslow AC | 2.57.56 | |
