= Grishayev =

Grishayev or Grishaev (Russian: Гришаев) is a Russian masculine surname, its feminine counterpart is Grishayeva or Grishaeva. It may refer to

- Boris Grishayev (1930–1999), Russian marathon runner
- Nadezhda Grishaeva (born 1989), Russian basketball player
- Nonna Grishayeva (born 1971), Russian actress, comedian, singer, and television presenter
