= Konstantin Vorobyov =

Konstantin Vorobyov is the name of

- Konstantin Vorobyov (writer) (1919–1975), Russian-Soviet writer
- Konstantin Vorobyov (athlete) (born 1930), Soviet marathon runner
- Konstantin Vorobyov (actor) (born 1960), Russian actor in Treasure Island (1982 film)
