= Thure Johansson =

Thure Johansson may refer to:

- Thure Johansson (athlete) (1886–?), Swedish long-distance runner who held a world best in the marathon
- Thure Johansson (wrestler) (1912–1986), Swedish wrestler who won a bronze medal in the 1948 Summer Olympics
- Thure G. Johansson, father of Swedish politician Ines Uusmann and discoverer of Bocksten Man
