= Harry Green (runner) =

British long-distance runner

Henry Harold Green DCM (15 July 1886 – 12 March 1934) was a British long-distance runner who competed in the marathon at the 1912 Summer Olympics, and is recognized by the International Association of Athletics Federations as having set a world's best in the marathon on 12 May 1913 with a time of 2:38:16.2 in London. Green was a member of the Herne Hill Harriers.

== Biography ==
Green competed for the Sutton Harriers and won a marathon in Surrey on Boxing Day 1908. At the inaugural Polytechnic Marathon run in London on 8 May 1909 he finished third, behind Henry Barrett and Fred Lord, with a time of 2:49:00.8. Although the 1910 Polytechnic Marathon was cancelled due to the death of King Edward, Green was one of 49 who started the 1911 race that made its way from Windsor Castle to Stamford Bridge. Competing for the Surrey Athletic Club, Green trailed Michael Ryan until Putney, 23 miles into the race. Taking the lead, he finished four minutes in front of Ryan with a time of 2:46:29.8. The New York Times described him as being in "fresh condition" at the end of the race.

Green was the favourite to win the 1912 Polytechnic Marathon, a race that also served as "England's tryouts for the Olympic games", but finished third behind James Corkery of Canada and Christian Gitsham of South Africa. During the 1912 Summer Olympics, he finished fourteenth in the marathon. In May 1913, Green broke the world marathon record at a track in Shepherds Bush, with a time of 2h, 38m, 16.2s. Green's record lasted nineteen days. On 31 May 1913, Alexis Ahlgren of Sweden eclipsed Green's mark with a 2:36:06 performance at the Polytechnic Marathon.

Green worked at Harrods until he signed up as a private during World War I. He was decorated with the Distinguished Conduct Medal and the French Médaille militaire for his service in the Gallipoli Campaign. Commissioned on the battlefield, he left the army with the rank of captain. After the war he ran a newsagents shop in Knights Hill, West Norwood and did not actively participate in major competitions. Green died of pneumonia in 1934. He was cremated at West Norwood Cemetery.

Records
Preceded by (Sweden) Thure Johansson	Men's Marathon World Record Holder; May 12, 1913 – May 31, 1913	Succeeded by (Sweden) Alexis Ahlgren
