= Geoff Iden =

British runner

Personal information
- Nationality: British (English)
- Born: 8 October 1914 Stepney, London, England
- Died: 12 January 1991 (aged 76) Southend-on-Sea, Essex, England
- Height: 175 cm (5 ft 9 in)
- Weight: 64 kg (141 lb)

Sport
- Sport: Athletics
- Event: middle/long-distance
- Club: Victoria Park Harriers

Geoffrey Lionel Iden (8 October 1914 – 12 January 1991) was a British middle- and long-distance runner who had his biggest successes in the marathon. He competed at the 1952 Summer Olympics.

== Biography ==
Iden was born in Stepney, London, and ran for the Victoria Park Harriers.

Iden finished second behind Jim Peters in the marathon event at the 1952 AAA Championships. Shortly afterwards he represented the Great Britain team at the 1952 Olympic Games in Helsinki, where he finished 9th in the 1952 Olympic Games marathon, where he was the first and only Briton to finish and ran a then personal best of 2 hours 30 minutes and 42 seconds. He was the first member of Victoria Park Harriers to take part in an Olympics.

Iden finished third again behind Peters at the 1953 AAA Championships and sixth in the European Athletics Championships of 1954.

In 1956, Iden finished second behind Bill McMinnis at the 1955 AAA Championships. His club record marathon time of 2 hours 25 minutes and 51 seconds in 1956 stood for more than fifty years, not being surpassed until September 2008. It is still a Masters record for the club as Iden was in his forties at the time.

He died in Southend-on-Sea, Essex.
