= Denis O'Gorman =

Denis O'Gorman may refer to:

- Denis O'Gorman (hurler)
- Denis O'Gorman (runner)
