= Olavi Manninen =

Finnish long-distance runner

Personal information
- Nationality: Finnish
- Born: 20 July 1928 Jyväskylä, Finland
- Died: 15 February 2011 (aged 82) Jyväskylä, Finland

Sport
- Sport: Long-distance running
- Event: Marathon

Olavi Manninen (20 July 1928 – 15 February 2011) was a Finnish long-distance runner. He competed in the marathon at the 1960 Summer Olympics. He finished fifth in the 1961 Boston Marathon; the race was won by fellow countryman Eino Oksanen.
