= Lee Chang-hoon =

Lee Chang-hoon may refer to:

- Lee Chang-hoon (athlete) (1935–2004), Korean former long-distance runner
- Lee Chang-hoon (actor) (born 1966), South Korean actor
- Lee Chang-hoon (footballer) (born 1986), South Korean football player
