= Terlizzi (surname) =

Terlizzi is an Italian surname. Notable people with the surname include:

- Christian Terlizzi (born 1979), Italian footballer
- Rodolfo Terlizzi (1896–1971), Italian fencer

== See also ==
- Vito Di Terlizzi (born 1930), Italian long-distance runner
