= Athletics at the 1957 World University Games – Men's 5000 metres =

The men's 5000 metres event at the 1957 World University Games was held at the Stadium Charlety in Paris on 8 September 1957.

== Results ==
Rank	Name	Nationality	Time	Notes
1st place, gold medalist(s)	Kevin Gilligan	Great Britain	14:31.0	
2nd place, silver medalist(s)	Veliša Mugoša	Yugoslavia	14:32.8	
3rd place, bronze medalist(s)	Gerhart Hecker	Hungary	14:37.0	
4	Pavel Kantorek	Czechoslovakia	14:38.6	
5	Takashi Baba	Japan	14:39.2	
6	Jack Heywood	Great Britain	14:42.0	
7	Heiner Keller	West Germany	14:45.6	
8	Tadahiko Fujii	Japan	14:46.2	
8	Jean Vaillant	France	14:52.2	
10	Roger Dunkley	Great Britain	14:58.8	
11	Władysław Sztwiertnia	Poland	15:01.4	
12	Karol Kristof	Czechoslovakia	15:07.4	
13	Tonscheidt	West Germany	15:21.2	
14	Piutti	Italy	15:22.4	
15	Jean Fonkenell	France	15:44.0	
16	Głuchowski	Poland	16:04.8	
