= Frederick Norris =

British long-distance runner (1921–2006)

Fred Norris
Personal information
- Born: 4 September 1921 Tyldesley, Lancashire, England
- Died: 13 December 2006 (aged 85) Tyldesley, Greater Manchester, England
- Education: McNeese State College
- Height: 167 cm (5 ft 6 in)
- Weight: 60 kg (132 lb)

Sport
- Sport: Athletics
- Event: mile – marathon
- Club: Bolton United Harriers

Achievements and titles
- Personal bests: 10,000 – 30:09.8 (1952); Mar – 2:19:08 (1960)
Medal record
Men's athletics
Representing Great Britain
European Championships
Bronze medal – third place	1958 Stockholm	Marathon

Frederick Norris (4 September 1921 – 13 December 2006) was a British long-distance runner who competed at the 1952 Summer Olympics and 1956 Summer Olympics.

== Biography ==
Born in Tyldesley, Lancashire, Norris left school at 14 to work in a machine shop before moving to Cleworth Hall Colliery in Tyldesley where he worked underground. As a young man, he played football for local teams but switched to running after watching a newsreel film of Emil Zátopek's 10,000 metres victory in the 1948 London Olympics. He joined Leigh Harriers and then Bolton Harriers, training on the streets of Tyldesley in the early mornings before working 900 feet (270 m) underground and running another 8 to 10 miles (13 to 16 km) in the evenings.

Norris finished second behind Gordon Pirie in the 6 miles event at the 1952 AAA Championships.

Norris competed in the 1952 Helsinki Olympics and in the 1956 Melbourne Olympics. He was seventh behind Zatopek in the 10,000 metres at the 1952 Helsinki Olympics and ran in the marathon at the 1956 Melbourne Olympics. He held 54 English, British, Commonwealth and European records and in 1959 won the International Cross Country Championships. He was injured and missed the 1960 Rome Olympics. He moved to America where he had a successful career before retiring aged 42.

Norris won the bronze medal at the 1958 European Athletics Championships in Stockholm, Sweden, behind two Soviet runners: Sergei Popov and Ivan Filin. He also represented the England athletics team in the 6 miles at the 1958 British Empire and Commonwealth Games in Cardiff, Wales.

Norris was lauded for his sportsmanship in the 1961 Boston Marathon, as he stopped to help fellow competitor John J. Kelley to his feet after Kelly had been knocked down by a dog—Kelley went on to finish second and Norris finished third. In 1962, at age 40, Norris ran a 4:21.9 mile (Masters Mile World Record), and he set a McNeese State College school record in the two-mile at 9:07.3.

Norris appeared on an episode of the television game show To Tell The Truth in 1961 as himself. He can be seen in film held by the Cinema Museum in London of the 1952 English Nationals, Ref HMO362.

Norris returned to Tyldesley in 1986 and died there in 2006.
