= Buddy Edelen =

American marathon runner (1937–1997)

Personal information
- Full name: Leonard Graves Edelen
- Born: September 22, 1937 Harrodsburg, Kentucky, U.S.
- Died: February 19, 1997 (aged 59) Tulsa, Oklahoma, U.S.
- Height: 5 ft 10 in (178 cm)
- Weight: 141 lb (64 kg)

Sport
- Sport: Long-distance running
- Event: Marathon
- College team: Minnesota Golden Gophers

Achievements and titles
- Personal bests: Marathon: 2:14:28; 10000 meters: 28:00.8; 5000 meters: 13:54.4; 2 miles: 8:57.4i

Leonard Graves "Buddy" Edelen (September 22, 1937 – February 19, 1997) was an American marathoner. Based in England for most of his prime competitive years, in 1963 Edelen became the first man to run a marathon faster than 2 hours and 15 minutes when he set a world record of 2:14:28. Edelen also won the 1964 U.S. Olympic marathon trials at Yonkers and represented the U.S. in the 1964 Summer Olympics in Tokyo, Japan.

== Biography ==
While born in Kentucky, Edelen attended high school in St. Louis Park, Minnesota, before graduating from Washington High School in Sioux Falls, South Dakota, in 1955. He then attended the University of Minnesota.

As a Golden Gopher, Edelen ran cross country and track. He finished top-10 in the NCAA Men's Division I Cross Country Championship twice: In 1956 he placed 9th in 20:33 and in 1957 he placed 4th in 19:44. He set the national record for the four-mile race.

Edelen won the British AAA Championships title in the 10 miles event at the 1962 AAA Championships.

In 1997, Edelen died of cancer at age 59.

In 2001 was inducted into the Gopher Athletics Hall of Fame. In 2016, he was elected into the National Track and Field Hall of Fame.

== Marathons ==
Edelen's promise in the marathon was evident early in his career. In 1962, he finished 4th at the Fukuoka Marathon in an American Record time of 2:18:57, making him the first American to run under 2:20 for the marathon. He was also the first American under 30:00 for the 10,000 m run.

On June 15, 1963, Edelen ran 2:14:28 at the Polytechnic Marathon (run from Windsor to Chiswick, England) to establish a new World Record. That record stood just two days short of a year, as England's Basil Heatley ran 2:13:55 at the 1964 Polytechnic Marathon (which was held on June 13). Edelen was the first American to hold the world record since 1925, and (excepting Alberto Salazar's 2:08:13 at the 1981 New York City Marathon, which later proved to be short) the last until naturalized American Khalid Khannouchi (originally from Morocco) broke his own World Record at the London Marathon in 2002.

After his record run 1963, Edelen also won the Košice Peace Marathon in Czechoslovakia (today Slovakia) in a course-record time of 2:15:09; that record would stand for fifteen years.

The following year, Edelen won the U.S. Olympic Trials marathon by nearly twenty minutes, and went on to finish 6th in the marathon at the Tokyo Olympic games.

In 2016, he was elected into the National Track and Field Hall of Fame.

== Achievements ==
Year	Competition	Venue	Position	Event	Notes
Representing the United States
1962	Fukuoka Marathon	Fukuoka, Japan	4th	Marathon	2:18:57 (AR)
1963	Polytechnic Marathon	Windsor, England	1st	Marathon	2:14:28 (WR)
1963	Košice Peace Marathon	Košice, Czechoslovakia	1st	Marathon	2:15:09
1964	Tokyo Olympic Games	Tokyo, Japan	6th	Marathon	2:18:12

Records
Preceded by (Japan) Toru Terasawa	Men's Marathon World Record Holder; June 15, 1963 – June 13, 1964	Succeeded by (United Kingdom) Basil Heatley
