= Silvio De Florentiis =

Italian long-distance runner (1935–2021)

Personal information
- Nationality: Italian
- Born: 9 January 1935 Genoa, Italy
- Died: 14 June 2021 (aged 86) Genoa, Italy

Sport
- Sport: Long-distance running
- Event: Marathon

Silvio De Florentiis (9 January 1935 – 14 June 2021) was an Italian long-distance runner. He competed in the marathon at the 1960 Summer Olympics.
