= Nikolay Rumyantsev (athlete) =

Soviet long-distance runner

Personal information
- Nationality: Soviet
- Born: 30 May 1930 Samara, Soviet Union
- Died: 15 June 2017 (aged 87) Saint Petersburg, Russia

Sport
- Sport: Long-distance running
- Event: Marathon

Nikolay Vassilyevich Rumyantsev (Russian: Николай Васильевич Румянцев; 1930–2017) was a Soviet long-distance runner. He competed in the marathon at the 1960 Summer Olympics.
