= Johannes Lauridsen =

Danish long-distance runner

Johannes Lauridsen (25 December 1930, Frederikshavn – 25 October 2006) was a Danish long distance runner. Lauridsen took part in the 1960 Summer Olympics in Rome, placing 41st in the marathon with a time of 2:32:32. He won the 8 km race at the 1956 Kongepokalen.
