= Albert Ivanov =

Soviet long-distance runner

Personal information
- Nationality: Soviet
- Born: 7 September 1931 Tapa, Estonia
- Died: 5 April 2000 (aged 68)

Sport
- Sport: Long-distance running
- Event: Marathon

Albert Ivanov (7 September 1931 – 5 April 2000) was a Soviet long-distance runner. He competed in the marathon at the 1956 Summer Olympics.
