= Linus Diaz =

Sri Lankan athlete

Linus Clifford Diaz
Personal information
- Nationality: Sri Lankan
- Born: 23 September 1933 (age 92) Kandy, Sri Lanka

Sport
- Sport: Long-distance running
- Event: Marathon

Linus Clifford Diaz (born 23 September 1933) is a Sri Lankan former long-distance runner. He competed in the marathon at the 1960 Summer Olympics.
