= Abebe Wakgira =

Ethiopian long-distance runner

Personal information
- Nationality: Ethiopian
- Born: 21 October 1921 Borena, Ethiopia

Sport
- Sport: Long-distance running
- Event: Marathon

Abebe Wakgira (also spelled Abebe Wakjira born 21 October 1921) is an Ethiopian long-distance runner. Abebe competed in the marathon at the 1960 Summer Olympics in Rome, finishing seventh in 2:21.09.4. Both he and Abebe Bikila notably run and completed this Olympic marathon barefoot, after having found their team provided shoes uncomfortable.
