= Keith James (athlete) =

South African long-distance runner (born 1934)

Personal information
- Nationality: South African
- Born: 5 November 1934 (age 91) Johannesburg, South Africa

Sport
- Sport: Long-distance running
- Event: Marathon

Keith Martin James (born 5 November 1934) is a South African long-distance runner. He competed in the marathon at the 1960 Summer Olympics.
