= Arnold Vaide =

Estonian-born Swedish athlete and football coach

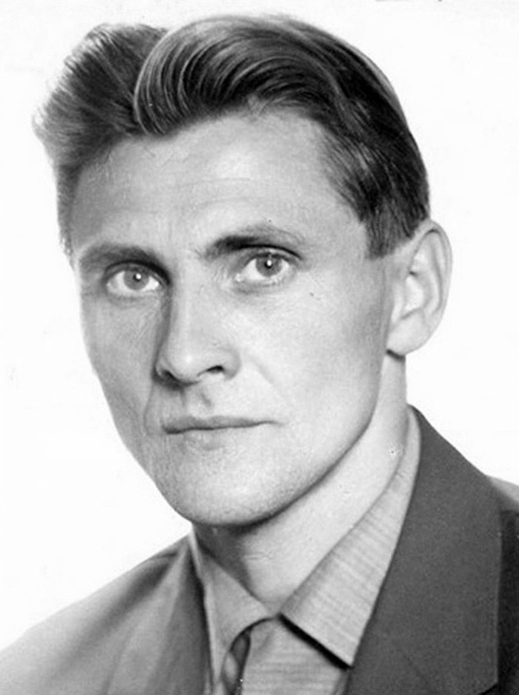

Personal information
- Born: Arnold Wiedenbach; 17 April 1926 Salla, Estonia
- Died: 5 June 2011 (aged 85) Halmstad, Sweden
- Height: 1.71 m (5 ft 7 1/2 in)
- Weight: 70 kg (154 lb)

Sport
- Sport: Athletics
- Event: Marathon
- Club: IFK Halmstad

Achievements and titles
- Personal best: 2:25:30 (1960)

Arnold Vaide (17 April 1926 – 5 June 2011) was an Estonian-born Swedish athlete and football coach. He was involved with various sections of the Halmstad sports club for 40 years.

== Athletics career ==
Arnold Vaide was born and raised in Salla, Estonia. His brother Karl Vaide was an accomplished orienteer, skiing and shooting referee and trainer. While a student, he began training as a skier under instruction of Elmar Liiv. In 1944, following the second Soviet occupation of Estonia during World War II, Vaide fled to Sweden as a refugee while his brother Karl remained in Estonia and became an Estonian veteran orienteering champion.

He competed for Sweden in the marathon at the 1956 and 1960 Olympics and placed 11th and 21st, respectively. He also won the Swedish national titles in 1958 and 1960.

== Football career ==
Arnold Vaide
Personal information
- Date of birth: 17 April 1926
- Place of birth: Salla, Estonia
- Date of death: 5 June 2011 (aged 85)
- Place of death: Halmstad, Sweden
- Height: 1.71 m (5 ft 7 1/2 in)

Managerial career
- Years: Team
- 1963: Halmstad

In 1963 he served as a coach of football club Halmstad, alongside Rune Ludvigsson. He was in charge of the player's fitness, while Ludvigsson was in charge of the match tactics.
