= Alexis Ahlgren =

Swedish long-distance runner (1887–1969)

Alexis Malkolm Ahlgren (14 July 1887 – 14 March 1969) was a Swedish long-distance runner who on 31 May 1913 set a world best of 2:36:06 at the Polytechnic Marathon. He competed in the men's marathon at the 1912 Summer Olympics but did not finish. He was born in Trollhättan.

Records
Preceded by (United Kingdom) Harry Green	Men's marathon world record holder 31 May 1913 – 22 August 1920	Succeeded by (Finland) Hannes Kolehmainen
Sporting positions
Preceded by James Joseph Corkery	Men's Polytechnic Marathon winner 1913	Succeeded by Akhmet Djebelia
