= Nobuyoshi Sadanaga =

Japanese long-distance runner (1929–2003)

Personal information
- Nationality: Japanese
- Born: 7 February 1929 Yamaguchi, Japan
- Died: 11 February 2003 (aged 74) Yamaguchi, Japan

Sport
- Sport: Long-distance running
- Event: Marathon

Nobuyoshi Sadanaga (貞永 信義, Sadanaga Nobuyoshi; 7 February 1929 – 11 February 2003) was a Japanese long-distance runner. He competed in the marathon at the 1960 Summer Olympics.

== Early life ==
Born in Yamaguchi Prefecture

At the age of 19, he took up track and field after being overtaken just before finishing his section in a relay race for the Youth Association, and was so upset that he decided to take up track and field. In 1950, he joined Kanebo and joined the Kanebo Track and Field Team (now the Kao Track and Field Team).

In 1957, he won the 6th Beppu-Oita Mainichi Marathon . In 1958, he won a bronze medal in the marathon at the Asian Games in Tokyo, and in the 12th Asahi International Marathon, which was held in Tochigi Prefecture, he overtook Veikko Karvonen of Finland, who had won the race three years earlier, in a close race at the finish line, winning his first race in a time of 2 hours, 24 minutes, and 1 second .
