= Yoshiaki Kawashima =

Japanese marathon runner

Personal information
- Nationality: Japanese
- Born: 10 May 1934 (age 92)

Sport
- Sport: Long-distance running
- Event: Marathon

Yoshiaki Kawashima (born 10 May 1934) is a Japanese long-distance runner. He competed in the marathon at the 1956 Summer Olympics.
