= Abdul Rashid (runner) =

Pakistani long-distance runner

Personal information
- Nationality: Pakistani
- Born: 25 April 1928

Sport
- Sport: Long-distance running
- Event: Marathon

Abdul Rashid (born 25 April 1928) is a Pakistani long-distance runner. He competed in the marathon at the 1956 Summer Olympics.
