= Im Hwa-dong =

South Korean long-distance runner

Personal information
- Nationality: South Korean
- Born: 1938 (age 87–88)

Sport
- Sport: Long-distance running
- Event: Marathon

Im Hwa-dong (born 1938) is a South Korean long-distance runner. He competed in the marathon at the 1956 Summer Olympics.

Im won the 1956 Chungmugong Spirit Inheritance Marathon hosted by Chonnam National University. He represented Chosun University.
