= Mercer Davies =

South African long-distance runner

Personal information
- Nationality: South African
- Born: 10 December 1924 East London, South Africa
- Died: 26 January 1997 (aged 72) Johannesburg, South Africa

Sport
- Sport: Long-distance running
- Event: Marathon

Mercer Davies (10 December 1924 – 26 January 1997) was a South African long-distance runner. He competed in the marathon at the 1956 Summer Olympics.
