= Gebre Birkay =

Ethiopian long-distance runner (born 1926)

Personal information
- Nationality: Ethiopian
- Born: 1926

Sport
- Sport: Long-distance running
- Event: Marathon

Gebre Birkay (born 1926) is an Ethiopian long-distance runner. He competed in the marathon at the 1956 Summer Olympics.
