= Kurt Hartung =

German long-distance runner

Personal information
- Nationality: German
- Born: 17 April 1925 Waldheim, Germany

Sport
- Sport: Long-distance running
- Event: Marathon

Kurt Hartung (born 17 April 1925) was a German long-distance runner. He competed in the marathon at the 1956 Summer Olympics.
