= Perri Shakes-Drayton =

English track and field athlete (born 1988)

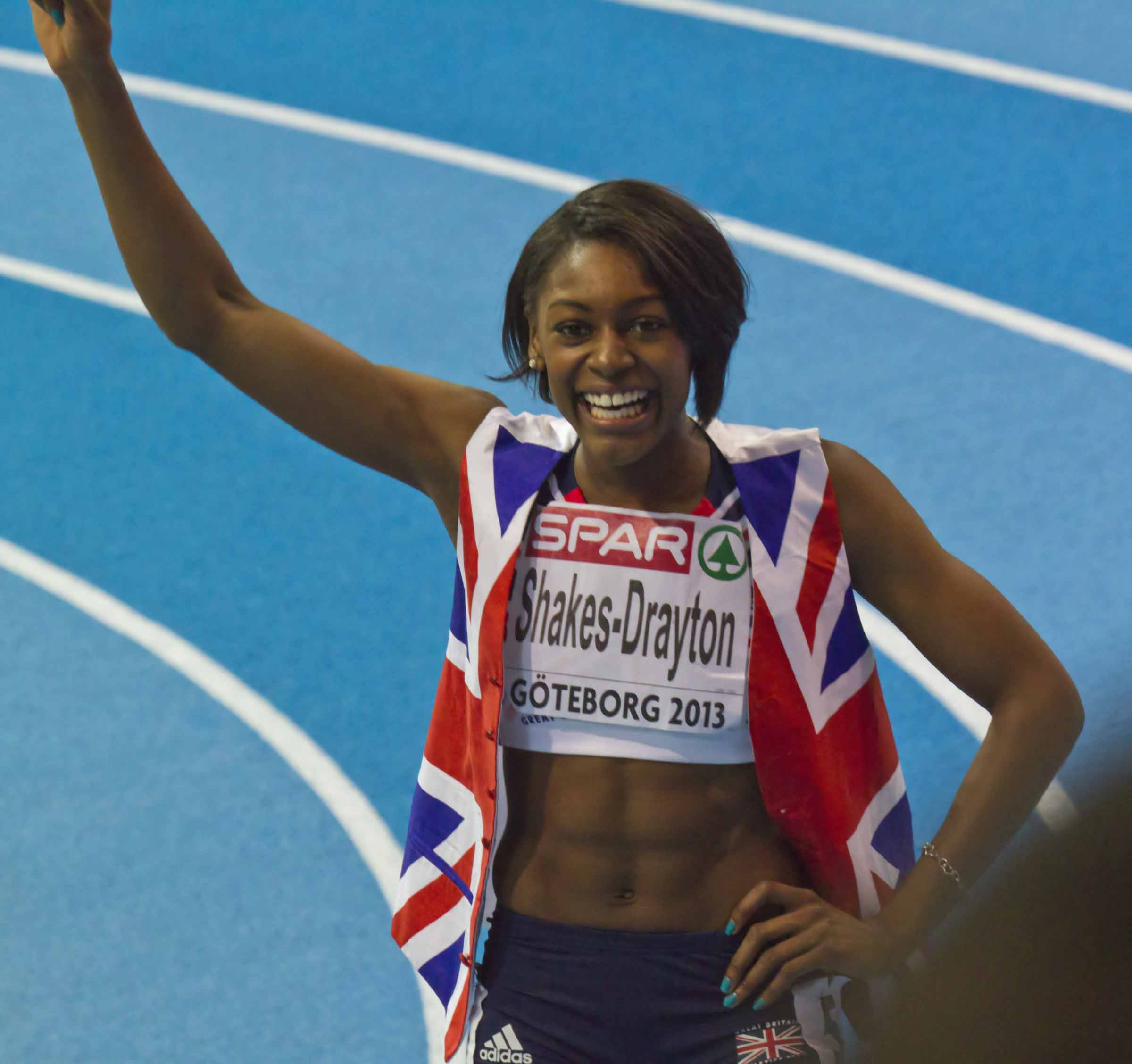
- Perri Shakes-Drayton in 2010

Personal information
- Born: 21 December 1988 (age 37) London, England
- Height: 1.72 m (5 ft 8 in)
- Weight: 66 kg (146 lb)

Sport
- Sport: Women's athletics
- Club: Victoria Park Harriers and Tower Hamlets

Achievements and titles
- Personal bests: 400 m hurdles: 53.67s (2013); 400 m: 50.50s (2013); 60 m: 7.44s (2009)
Medal record
Representing Great Britain
World Championships
Silver medal – second place	2017 London	4 × 400 m
Bronze medal – third place	2011 Daegu	4 × 400 m
World Indoor Championships
Gold medal – first place	2012 Istanbul	4 × 400 m
Bronze medal – third place	2010 Doha	4 × 400 m
Diamond League
Silver medal – second place	2012	400 m hurdles
European Championships
Bronze medal – third place	2010 Barcelona	400 m hurdles
Silver medal – second place	2010 Barcelona	4 × 400 m
European Indoor Championships
Gold medal – first place	2013 Gothenburg	400 m
Gold medal – first place	2013 Gothenburg	4 × 400 m
European U23 Championships
Gold medal – first place	2009 Kaunas	400 m hurdles
European Junior Championships
Silver medal – second place	2007 Hengelo	400 m hurdles

Peirresha Alexandra Shakes-Drayton (born 21 December 1988) is a British retired track and field athlete. After specialising in the 400 metres hurdles in the early part of her career, a knee injury at the 2013 World Championships forced Shakes-Drayton to concentrate on the 400 metres on her return to athletics. She is the 2013 European Indoor Champion in the 400 metres and won a 2012 World Indoor Championship gold medal in the 4 × 400 metres relay. She has also won silver and bronze medals in the 4 × 400 m relay at the World Championships.

== Early life and education ==
Shakes-Drayton was born in east London to parents from Grenada and grew up in Bow, where she continues to reside. She attended Holy Family R.C. Primary School in Poplar and Bishop Challoner Catholic School in Stepney. She studied sports science at Brunel University, where she graduated with a 2:1.

== Athletics career ==
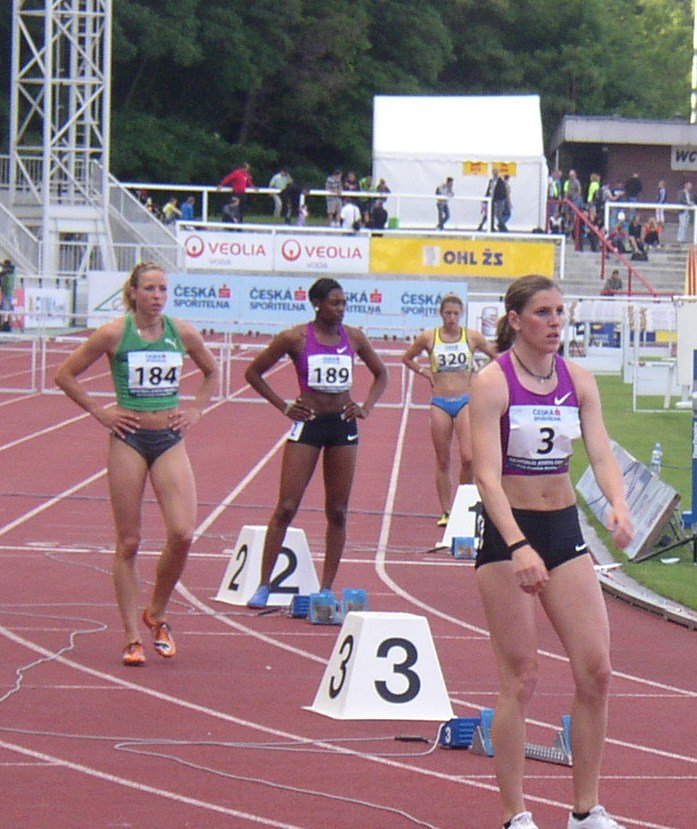
Shakes-Drayton (lane 2) at the 2010 Josef Odložil Memorial in Prague, where she finished second in 55.28 s.

Shakes-Drayton came to prominence at the English Schools Championships where she set a UK junior record time in the 400 m hurdles. She made her first major international appearance at the 2006 World Junior Championships in Athletics where she finished eighth, achieving a new personal best of 57.52 seconds. She took the silver medal at the 2007 European Athletics Junior Championships with a time of 56.46 s, a national junior record in the event.

Shakes-Drayton won the 400 m hurdles at the 2008 Olympic Games GB trials, but veteran Tasha Danvers was instead chosen to represent Great Britain, and went on to win the bronze medal. Despite the non-selection, Shakes-Drayton was considered to be a medal prospect for the next Olympics in 2012. At the 2009 British Championships in Birmingham, she finished second in the 400 metres behind reigning world champion Christine Ohuruogu, setting a new personal best. Further success came on the junior circuit at the 2009 European Athletics U23 Championships, where she won the 400 m hurdles gold medal with a run of 55.26 seconds, another personal best. Having secured a place on the Great Britain team, she set her sights on the 2009 World Championships in Athletics, remarking: "I like people talking about me. It means I must be doing some things right. Now I have to live up to the hype because hype is pointless if you don't live up to it."

She ran at the 2009 World Championships in Athletics in Berlin and reached the semi-finals of the competition. However, she finished seventh in the race with a time of 57.57 seconds and did not compete in the final. She ran a personal best of 54.91 seconds for the 400 m hurdles to win at the Memorial Primo Nebiolo in June 2010.

In the absence of Tasha Danvers, Shakes-Drayton and Eilidh Child were the sole representatives for Great Britain at the 2010 European Athletics Championships. Shakes-Drayton finished 2nd in her heat, with a time of 55.35. She then finished 3rd in her semi-final to qualify for the final in a new personal best of 54.73. In the final she finished third to win the bronze medal with a new personal best of 54.18.

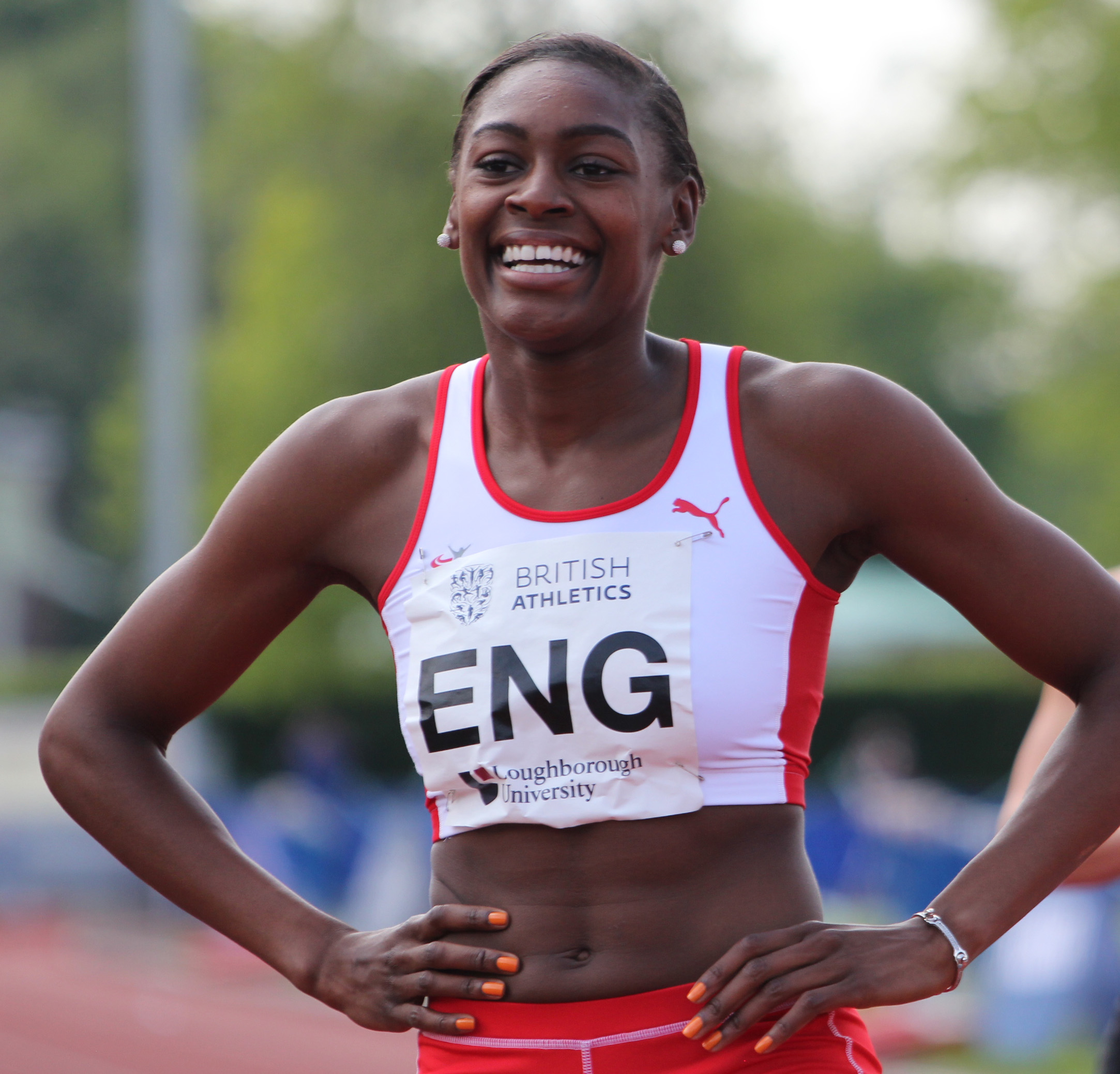
Perri Shakes-Drayton after winning a 400 m match during the 2013 Loughborough International Athletics

At the 2012 London Grand Prix, the final Diamond League meeting prior to the 2012 London Olympic Games, Shakes-Drayton recorded another personal best for the 400 m hurdles of 53.77, a time that put her second in the world rankings for the year and also made her the second-fastest British athlete of all time in the event, behind only Sally Gunnell. However, in the Olympic 400 m hurdles she was unable to reach the final, finishing third in her semi-final heat. She was also part of the GB 4 × 400 m relay team which finished fifth in the final of that event.

At the 2013 European Athletics Indoor Championships in Gothenburg, Shakes-Drayton went on to win gold in the Women's 400 m final with a Personal Best of 50.85, ahead of another Great Britain runner Eilidh Child. She was also part of the Women's 4 × 400 m team (along with Eilidh Child, Shana Cox and Christine Ohuruogu) that won gold at the same championships.

In 2020, she announced her retirement from her athletics career.

== Personal life ==
Shakes-Drayton married high-jump athlete Mike Olayemi Edwards in London in June 2019. Shakes-Drayton gave birth to her first child with Edwards on 26 August 2020. Shakes-Drayton is an honorary member of Zeta Phi Beta sorority; she was inducted on July 27, 2024, at the sorority's Boulé in Indianapolis, Indiana.

In 2018, Shakes-Drayton took part in the tenth series of the ITV show Dancing on Ice.

== Personal bests ==
Event	Time (sec)	Location	Date
60 metres	7.44	London, United Kingdom	18 January 2009
400 metres	50.50	Gateshead, United Kingdom	22 June 2013
400 metres hurdles	53.67	London, United Kingdom	26 July 2013
400 metres (indoor)	50.85	Gothenburg, Sweden	3 March 2013
