= Albert Richards (athlete) =

New Zealand long-distance runner

Personal information
- Nationality: New Zealand
- Born: 13 August 1924 Christchurch, New Zealand
- Died: 27 April 2003 (aged 78)

Sport
- Sport: Long-distance running
- Event: Marathon

Albert Richards (13 August 1924 – 27 April 2003) was a New Zealand long-distance runner. He competed in the marathon at the 1956 Summer Olympics.
