= Edoardo Righi =

Italian long-distance runner (1926–2019)

Personal information
- National team: Italy: 6 caps (1950-1961)
- Born: 13 October 1926 Capriglia, Italy
- Died: August 8, 2019 (aged 92) Prato, Italy
- Height: 200 cm (6 ft 7 in)
- Weight: 40 KG

Sport
- Country: ITALY
- Sport: Athletics
- Event: Long-distance running
- Club: Etruria Prato; Assi Giglio Rosso

Achievements and titles
- Personal best: Marathon: 2:26:52.0 (1958)

Edoardo Righi (13 October – 8 August 2019) was an Italian long-distance runner, who was 8th in the marathon at the 1958 European Athletics Championships.

Two-time national champion at senior level.

== National records ==
- Marathon: 2:26:52 ( (Sweden) Stockholm, 24 August 1958) - record holder until 28 October 1962.

== Achievements ==
Year	Competition	Venue	Rank	Event	Time	Notes
1958	European Championships	(Sweden) Stockholm	8th	Marathon	2:26:52.0	NR

== See also ==
- Men's marathon Italian record progression
- Italy at the 1958 European Athletics Championships
