= Morio Shigematsu =

Japanese long-distance runner (born 1940)

Morio Shigematsu (重松 森雄, Shigematsu Morio; born 21 June 1940) is a former Japanese long-distance runner who competed in marathons.

On June 12, 1965, Shigematsu set a world's best in the marathon with a time of 2:12:00 at the Polytechnic Marathon. Less than two months earlier, he had set a course record at the 1965 Boston Marathon (2:16:33). In his career, in 22 marathons started, he recorded 6 victories, placed second 3 times and third once. Shigematsu ran seven marathons under 2:20.

== Marathons ==
- All results regarding marathon, unless stated otherwise

Year	Competition	Venue	Position	Notes
Representing Japan
1964	Fukuoka Marathon	Fukuoka, Japan	5th	2:17:57
1965	Beppu Ōita Marathon	Beppu, Japan	4th	2:16:15
1965	Boston Marathon	Boston, United States	1st	2:16:33
1965	Polytechnic Marathon	Chiswick, United Kingdom	1st	2:12:00 WB
1966	Beppu Ōita Marathon	Beppu, Japan	9th	2:16:16
1968	Beppu Ōita Marathon	Beppu, Japan	10th	2:17:46
1968	Lake Biwa Marathon	Ōtsu, Japan	4th	2:17:15

Records
Preceded by (Ethiopia) Abebe Bikila	Men's marathon world record holder June 12, 1965–December 3, 1967	Succeeded by (Australia) Derek Clayton
Sporting positions
Preceded by Basil Heatley	Men's Polytechnic Marathon winner 1965	Succeeded by Graham Taylor
