= 1954 European Athletics Championships – Men's marathon =

Men's marathon at the European Athletics Championships

The men's marathon at the 1954 European Athletics Championships was held in Bern, Switzerland, on 25 August 1954.

== Medalists ==
Gold	Veikko Karvonen; Finland
Silver	Boris Grishayev; Soviet Union
Bronze	Ivan Filin; Soviet Union

== Results ==
=== Final ===
25 August

Rank	Name	Nationality	Time	Notes
1st place, gold medalist(s)	Veikko Karvonen	Finland	2:24:51.6	CR
2nd place, silver medalist(s)	Boris Grishayev	Soviet Union	2:24:55.6	
3rd place, bronze medalist(s)	Ivan Filin	Soviet Union	2:25:26.6	
4	Erkki Puolakka	Finland	2:26:45.6	
5	Gustaf Jansson	Sweden	2:27:27.8	
6	Geoff Iden	Great Britain	2:28:02.8	
7	Janus van der Zande	Netherlands	2:29:19.2	
8	José Araujo	Portugal	2:29:45.0	
9	Victor Olsen	Norway	2:33:49.4	
10	Cristea Dinu	Romania	2:35:07.4	
11	Eric Smith	Great Britain	2:35:22.2	
12	Bengt Rehnvall	Sweden	2:35:48.6	
13	Walter Bednář	Czechoslovakia	2:36:41.4	
14	Hans Vollbach	West Germany	2:40:02.4	
15	Claudino Martins	Portugal	2:41:01.4	
16	Adolf Gruber	Austria	2:41:59.6	
17	Franjo Škrinjar	Yugoslavia	2:42:11.8	
18	August Blumensaat	West Germany	2:42:32.2	
19	Jules Zehnder	Switzerland	2:45:27.8	
20	Guillaume Marquet	Belgium	2:48:47.2	
21	Michel Pressencé	France	2:55:52.4	
22	Hans Studer	Switzerland	2:58:22.0	

== Participation ==
According to an unofficial count, 22 athletes from 15 countries participated in the event.

- Austria (1)
- Belgium (1)
- Czechoslovakia (1)
- Finland (2)
- France (1)
- Netherlands (1)
- Norway (1)
- Portugal (2)
- Romania (1)
- Soviet Union (2)
- Sweden (2)
- Switzerland (2)
- Great Britain (2)
- West Germany (2)
- Yugoslavia (1)
