= Bashay Feleke =

Ethiopian long-distance runner

Personal information
- Nationality: Ethiopian
- Born: 1917
- Died: February 2008 (aged 90–91)

Sport
- Sport: Long-distance running
- Event: Marathon

Bashay Feleke (1917 – February 2008) was an Ethiopian long-distance runner. He competed in the marathon at the 1956 Summer Olympics.
