= Men's marathon Italian record progression =

The Italian record progression men's marathon is recognised by the Italian Athletics Federation (FIDAL).

== Record progression ==
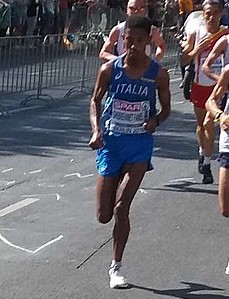
Eyob Faniel current Italian recordman.

Breaking down barriers

Record	Athlete	Venue	Date
2:29:30	Edoardo Righi	(Italy) Treviso	22 June 1958
2:26:52	Edoardo Righi	(Sweden) Stockholm	24 August 1958
2:24:09	Antonio Ambu	(Italy) Lecce	28 October 1962
2:22:24	Antonio Ambu	(Italy) Catania	4 November 1966
2:18:04	Antonio Ambu	(United States) Boston	19 April 1967
2:17:21	Antonio Brutti	(Belgium) Brussels	11 June 1972
2:15:41	Giuseppe Cindolo	(Italy) Cassinetta	25 April 1974
2:11:45	Giuseppe Cindolo	(Japan) Fukuoka	7 December 1975
2:11:19	Gianni Poli	(Japan) Fukuoka	6 December 1981
2:11:05	Gianni Poli	(Finland) Helsinki	14 August 1983
2:10:23	Orlando Pizzolato	(Japan) Hiroshima	14 April 1985
2:09:57	Gianni Poli	(United States) Chicago	20 October 1985
2:09:27	Gelindo Bordin	(United States) Boston	18 April 1988
2:08:19	Gelindo Bordin	(United States) Boston	16 April 1990
2:07:57	Stefano Baldini	(United Kingdom) London	13 April 1997
2:07:52	Giacomo Leone	(Japan) Ōtsu	23 April 2001
2:07:29	Stefano Baldini	(United Kingdom) London	14 April 2002
2:07:22	Stefano Baldini	(United Kingdom) London	23 April 2006
2:07:19	Eyob Faniel	(Spain) Seville	23 February 2020
2:06:06	Yemaneberhan Crippa	(Spain) Seville	18 February 2024
2:05:24	Yohanes Chiappinelli	(Spain) Valencia	1 December 2024
2:04:26	Iliass Aouani	(Japan) Tokyo	1 March 2026

== See also ==
- List of Italian records in athletics
- Men's marathon world record progression
