= Jagmal Singh (athlete) =

Indian long-distance runner

Personal information
- Full name: Jagmal Singh Ragho
- Nationality: Indian
- Born: 20 March 1923 Bhondsi, Haryana, British India

Sport
- Sport: Long-distance running
- Event: Marathon

Jagmal Singh (born 20 March 1923) is an Indian long-distance runner. He competed in the marathon at the 1960 Summer Olympics.
