= Klaus Porbadnik =

German long-distance runner (born 1930)

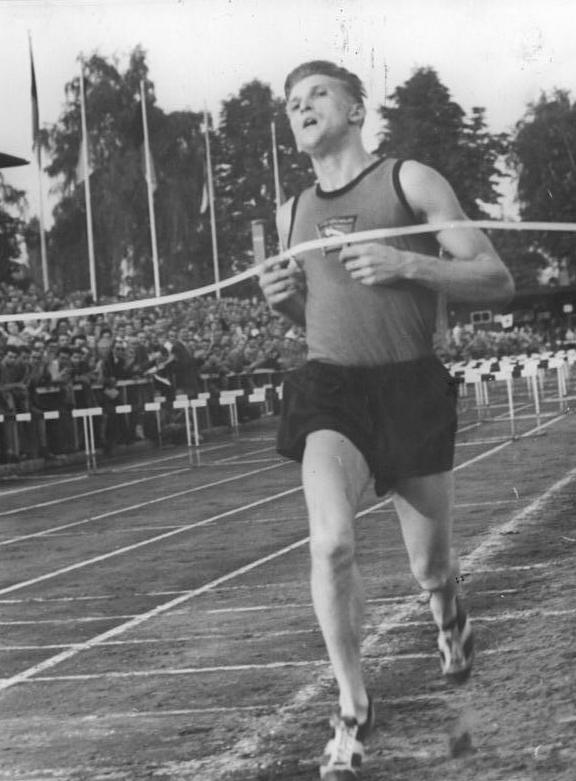
- Klaus Porbadnik in 1955

Personal information
- Nationality: German
- Born: 24 June 1930 (age 96) Hohenstein, East Prussia, Weimar Germany (Olsztynek, Poland)

Sport
- Sport: Long-distance running
- Event: Marathon

Klaus Porbadnik (born 24 June 1930) is a German long-distance runner. He competed in the marathon at the 1956 Summer Olympics.
