= Victoria Park Harriers and Tower Hamlets Athletics Club =

British athletic club

Victoria Park Harriers and Tower Hamlets AC
- Founded: 1926/2001
- Location: St Augustine's Hall, Cadogan Terrace, London E9 5EG, England
- Coordinates: 51°32′40″N 0°01′58″W
- Website: official website

Victoria Park Harriers and Tower Hamlets Athletics Club (VPH & TH AC) is an athletics club in London in Tower Hamlets, East London, England. The club's headquarters are located at St Augustine's Hall, Cadogan Terrace next to Victoria Park, Tower Hamlets.

== Competitions ==
For competitions, in Track and Field, VPH competes in Division 2 of the Southern Athletics League. In Cross Country, VPH competes in the London Met League. The track used by Victoria Park Harriers and Tower Hamlets is the Mile End Stadium in Mile End while the club's headquarters is in Victoria Park.

== History ==
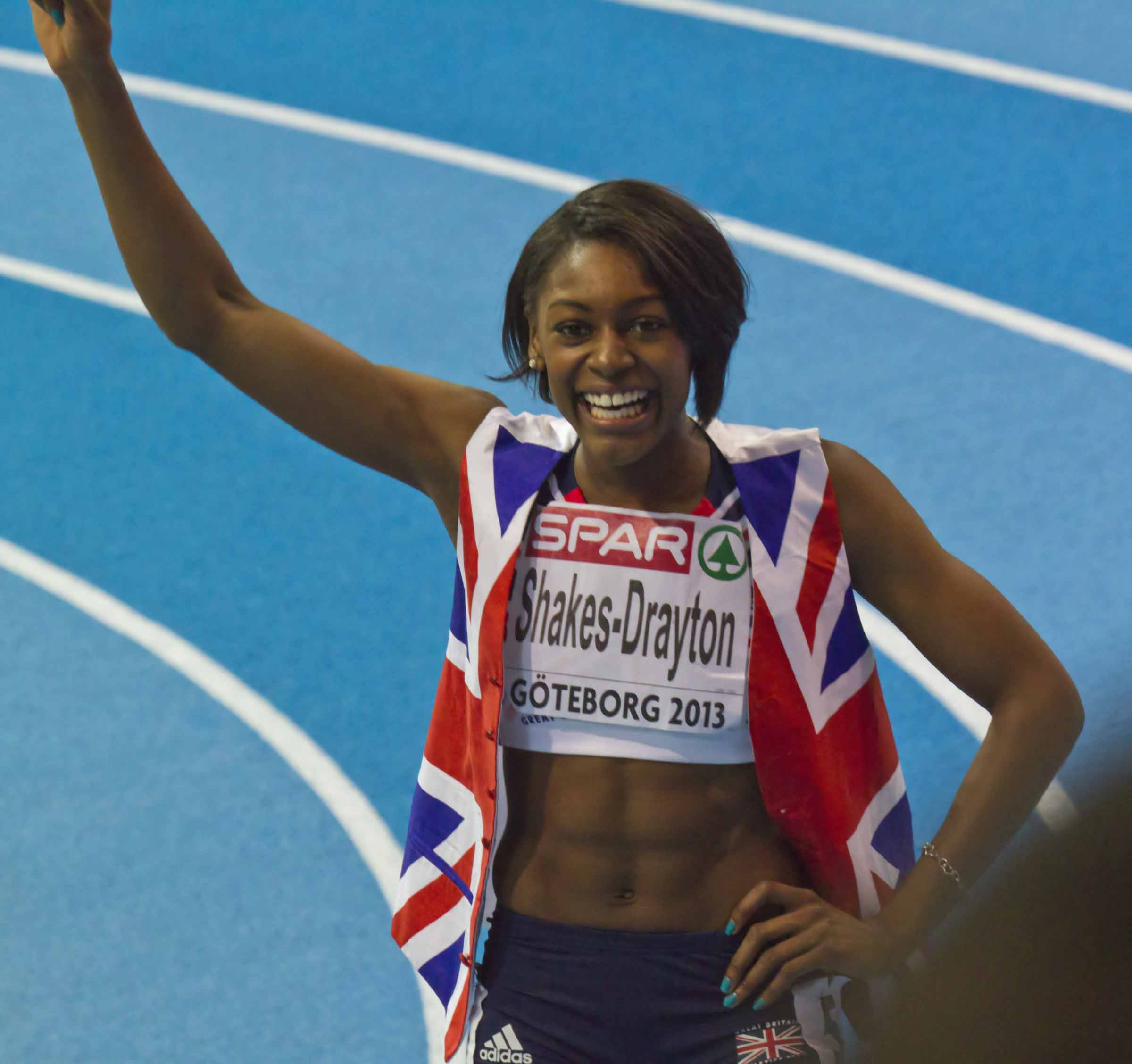
Perri Shakes-Drayton in 2013

The origins of the club began with the formation of the Victoria Park Harriers in 1926, who subsequently held their first summer meeting on 27 April 1927 and were primarily a cross country club.

A second club called Tower Hamlets Athletics Club was formed in 1976, before a merger of both clubs took place in 2001. The new club was refounded as the Victoria Park Harriers and Tower Hamlets Athletics Club. With Victoria Park Harriers being mainly a cross country club and Tower Hamlets Athletics Club mainly being a track and field club, the merger suited both clubs.

The track used by Victoria Park Harriers and Tower Hamlets, Mile End stadium, was the closest athletics club track to the Olympic Stadium during 2012, and it was used by the US Olympic Athletics team for training during the Olympics.

== Notable athletes ==
=== Olympians ===
Athlete	Club	Events	Games	Medals/Pos, Ref
Geoff Iden	VPH	marathon	1952	
Perri Shakes-Drayton	VPH & TH AC	400m hurdles/4x400m relay	2012	

== Kits ==
The club's kit is a white vest or crop top with a green and blue diagonal line.
