= 1961 Boston Marathon =

Footrace in Boston, Massachusetts, USA

- Venue: Boston, Massachusetts, U.S.
- Date: April 19, 1961
- Competitors: 165

Champions
- Men: Eino Oksanen (2:23:29)

The 1961 Boston Marathon took place on Wednesday, April 19, 1961. (Note: Per the Boston Athletic Association: "From 1897–1968, the Boston Marathon was held on Patriots' Day, April 19, a holiday commemorating the start of the Revolutionary War and recognized only in Massachusetts and Maine. The lone exception was when the 19th fell on Sunday. In those years, the race was held the following day (Monday the 20th). However, in 1969, the holiday was officially moved to the third Monday in April.") It was the 65th time the Boston Marathon was organized. Contemporary news sources noted there were 231 registered runners, with 165 actually starting the event. It was the coldest weather for the race since the 1925 edition, at 39 °F (4 °C).

The race was won by Eino Oksanen of Finland in 2:23:29. American John J. Kelley finished second, 25 seconds behind, and British runner Frederick Norris finished third, nearly two minutes later. There were 101 runners that finished the race, all men.

This edition of the marathon is remembered for an incident in Newton Lower Falls, approximately 16 miles (26 km) into the race, when a dog that had been running with the athletes knocked down John J. Kelley. In an act of sportsmanship, Frederick Norris stopped and helped Kelley get up. Kelley recovered well enough to lead the race until he was overtaken by Eino Oksanen with approximately 1,000 yards (910 m) left. After the race, Kelley refused to blame the dog for his defeat.

== Results ==
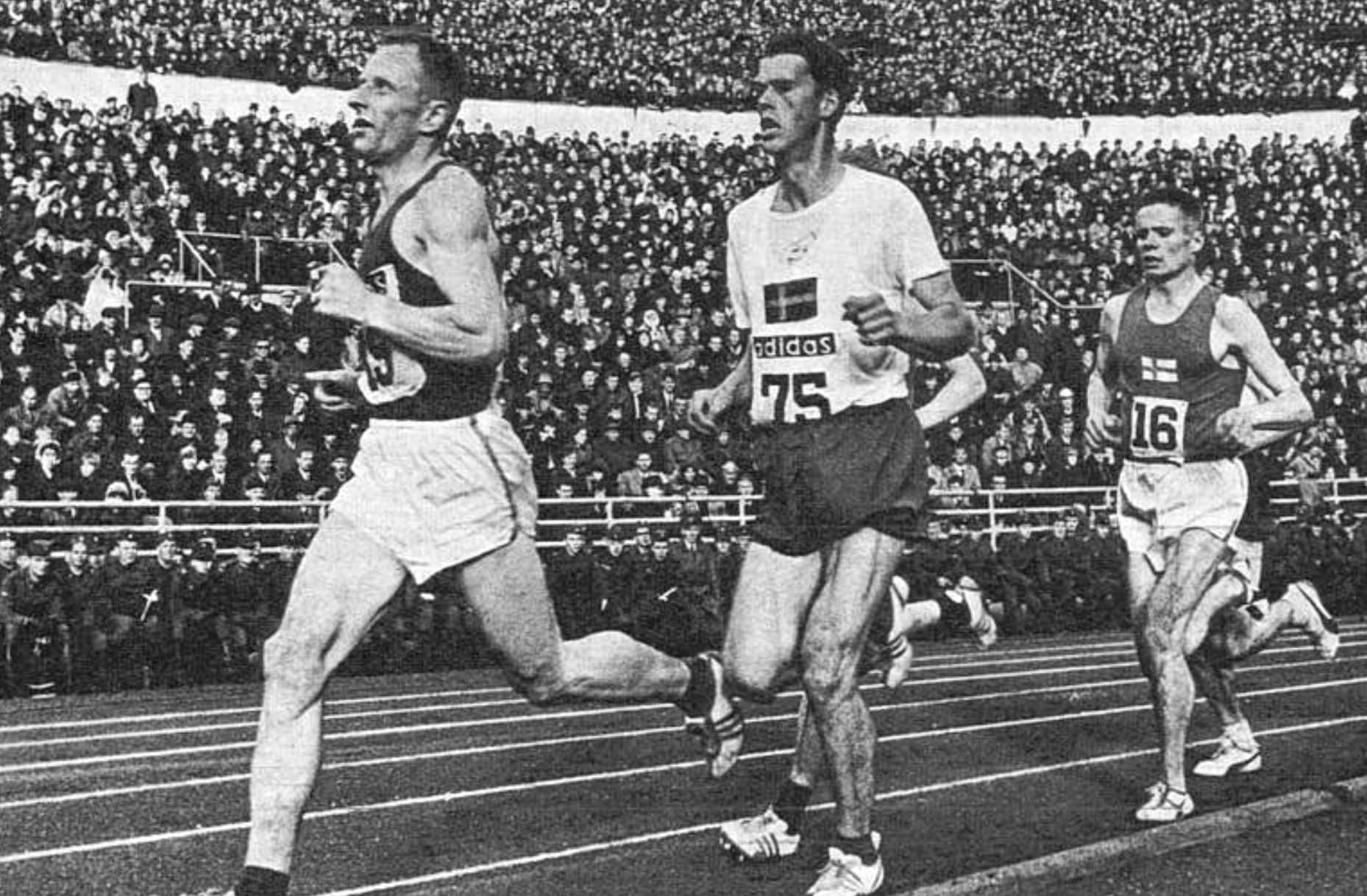
Eino Oksanen, at left, in a 1964 race

Position	Athlete	Nationality	Time
1	Eino Oksanen	Finland	2:23:29
2	John J. Kelley	United States	2:23:54
3	Frederick Norris	United Kingdom	2:25:46
4	Gordon McKenzie	United States	2:28:40
5	Olavi Manninen	Finland	2:29:46
6	George Terry	United States	2:30:20
7	Gar Williams	United States	2:32:22
8	Fritz Gruber	Austria	2:32:49
9	James Green	United States	2:32:58
10	Edward Duncan	United States	2:33:46

Other notable runners included Johnny Kelley (17th).
