= Willie Dunne =

Irish long-distance runner (1933–2023)

Personal information
- Nationality: Irish
- Born: 12 September 1933 Dublin, Ireland
- Died: 13 December 2023 (aged 90) Dublin, Ireland

Sport
- Sport: Long-distance running
- Event: Marathon

William Dunne (12 September 1933 – 14 December 2023) was an Irish long-distance runner. He competed in the marathon at the 1960 Summer Olympics. Dunne died in Dublin on 14 December 2023, at the age of 90.
