= Ron Clark (long-distance runner) =

British long-distance runner

Personal information
- Nationality: British
- Born: 9 March 1930 Lambeth, London
- Died: 27 October 2022 (aged 92)

Sport
- Sport: Long-distance running
- Event: Marathon

Ron Clark (9 March 1930 – 27 October 2022) was a British long-distance runner. He competed in the marathon at the 1956 Summer Olympics.
