= Hideo Hamamura =

Japanese marathon runner (1928–2000)

Hideo Hamamura (濱村 秀雄, Hamamura Hideo; 20 July 1928 – 7 May 2000) was a Japanese marathon runner.

He won the Boston Marathon in 1955 in a time of 2:18.22 which was a course record. He was 16th in the 1956 Olympic Games marathon in Melbourne.

After retiring from competitive racing, he became an athletics coach.

He died on 7 May 2000 from a malignant tumour.
