= Jo Jae-hyeon (cyclist) =

South Korean cyclist

Personal information
- Born: 5 July 1938 (age 88) Seoul, South Korea

Cycling career
- Sport: Cycling

- Jo Jae-hyeon
- Hangul: 조재현
- Hanja: 趙才鉉
- RR: Jo Jaehyeon
- MR: Cho Chaehyŏn

Jo Jae-hyeon (born 5 July 1938) is a former South Korean cyclist. He competed in the individual road race and team time trial events at the 1960 Summer Olympics.
