= Khoronkhoy =

Khoronkhoy Хоронхой
- Settlement
- Location within Republic of Buryatia Location within Russia
- Coordinates: 50°28′N 106°08′E
- Country: Russia
- Region: Republic of Buryatia
- District: Kyakhtinsky District
- Time zone: UTC+8:00

Khoronkhoy (Russian: Хоронхой) is a rural locality (a settlement) in Kyakhtinsky District, Republic of Buryatia, Russia. The population was 2,041 as of 2010. There are 32 streets.

== Geography ==
Khoronkhoy is located 35 km northwest of Kyakhta (the district's administrative centre) by road. Ust-Kyakhta is the nearest rural locality.
