= Gerhart Hecker =

Hungarian runner (1933–2023)

Personal information
- Nationality: Hungarian
- Born: 11 September 1933 Budapest, Hungary
- Died: 1 June 2023 (aged 89)

Sport
- Sport: Long-distance running
- Event: Marathon

Gerhart Hecker (11 September 1933 – 1 June 2023) was a Hungarian long-distance runner. He competed in the marathon at the 1960 Summer Olympics. Hecker died on 1 June 2023, at the age of 89.
