= Konstantin Vorobyov (athlete) =

Soviet marathon runner

Konstantin Vorobyov (born 30 October 1930) is a Soviet former marathon runner. He was born in Kirov Oblast. In 1960 he became Soviet champion and finished fourth at the 1960 Summer Olympics with his personal best of 2:19:10 h.
