= Thomas Nilsson (athlete) =

Swedish long-distance runner

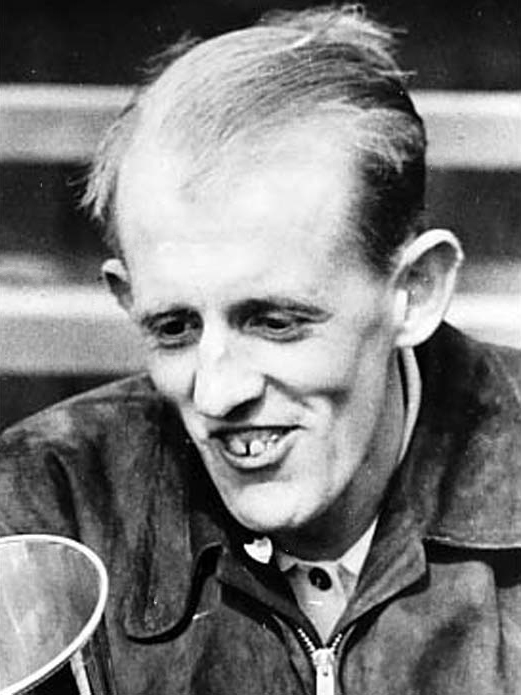

Personal information
- Born: 9 April 1926 Ljungby, Sweden
- Died: 18 November 2014 (aged 88) Kalmar, Sweden
- Height: 189 cm (6 ft 2 in)
- Weight: 64 kg (141 lb)

Sport
- Sport: Athletics
- Event(s): 10,000 m, marathon
- Club: SK Grail, Strömsnäsbruk; IFK Halmstad

Achievements and titles
- Personal best(s): 10,000 m – 30:09.6 (1954); Marathon – 2:22:05.4 (1956)

Thomas Hilt Nilsson (9 April 1926 – 18 November 2014) was a Swedish long-distance runner. He placed 9th over 10,000 m at the 1954 European Championships, ninth in the marathon at the 1956 Summer Olympics, and 12th in the marathon at the 1958 European Championships. He won the Košice Peace Marathon in 1956, setting his personal record, and placed fifth in 1955.
