= Thure Johansson (athlete) =

Swedish long-distance runner (1888–1970)

Thure Johansson (Oct 16, 1888 – June 21, 1970) was a Swedish long-distance runner who is credited by the International Association of Athletics Federations for setting a world's best of 2:40:34 in the marathon on August 31, 1909. Johansson's record was reportedly set on a 368-meter indoor track at the Idrottsparken Velodrome Marathon in Stockholm, Sweden.

Competing against American Jim Crowley and Canadian Hans Holmer at the 69th Regiment Armory in New York City, Johansson broke Dorando Pietri's indoor record for the marathon on March 1, 1910 (2:36:55.2). (Note: Available sources reveal a number of inconsistencies in the claim that it was Peitri's mark that was bested by Johansson on March 1, 1910 or that Johansson mark was truly a record-setting performance. The New York Times reported that Johansson broke Peitri's mark of 2:44:20.4 which was set on November 28, 1908; however, data provided by the Association of Road Racing Statistician indicates three faster times (including Charlie Gardiner's 2:37:01.4 on December 18, 1909) were recorded in the interim leading up to the Crowley/Holmer/Johansson race. Two days after their initial report, The New York Times published that there was "considerable discussion" that the race distance may have been short due to how the course was measured. The Association of Road Racing Statisticians does not indicate any irregularity with the distance or performance, and the International Association of Athletics Federations would not have reported Johansson's March 1, 1910 performance as a previous world best because it was set as a professional.) As of May 2010, the Association of Road Racing Statisticians notes that Johansson's mark still stands as the sixth fastest time on an indoor track. The following month, Johansson soundly defeated Crowley in a match race at Celtic Park in New York City.

Johansson was trained and managed by Swedish-born Ernie Hjertberg, coach of the Irish American Athletic Club and a prior US track and field champion.

== Notes ==
Records
Preceded by (United Kingdom) Henry Barrett	Men's Marathon World Record Holder; August 31, 1909 – May 12, 1913	Succeeded by (United Kingdom) Harry Green
