= Salla, Estonia =

Village in Estonia

Coordinates: 58°57′N 26°23′E

Salla
- Village
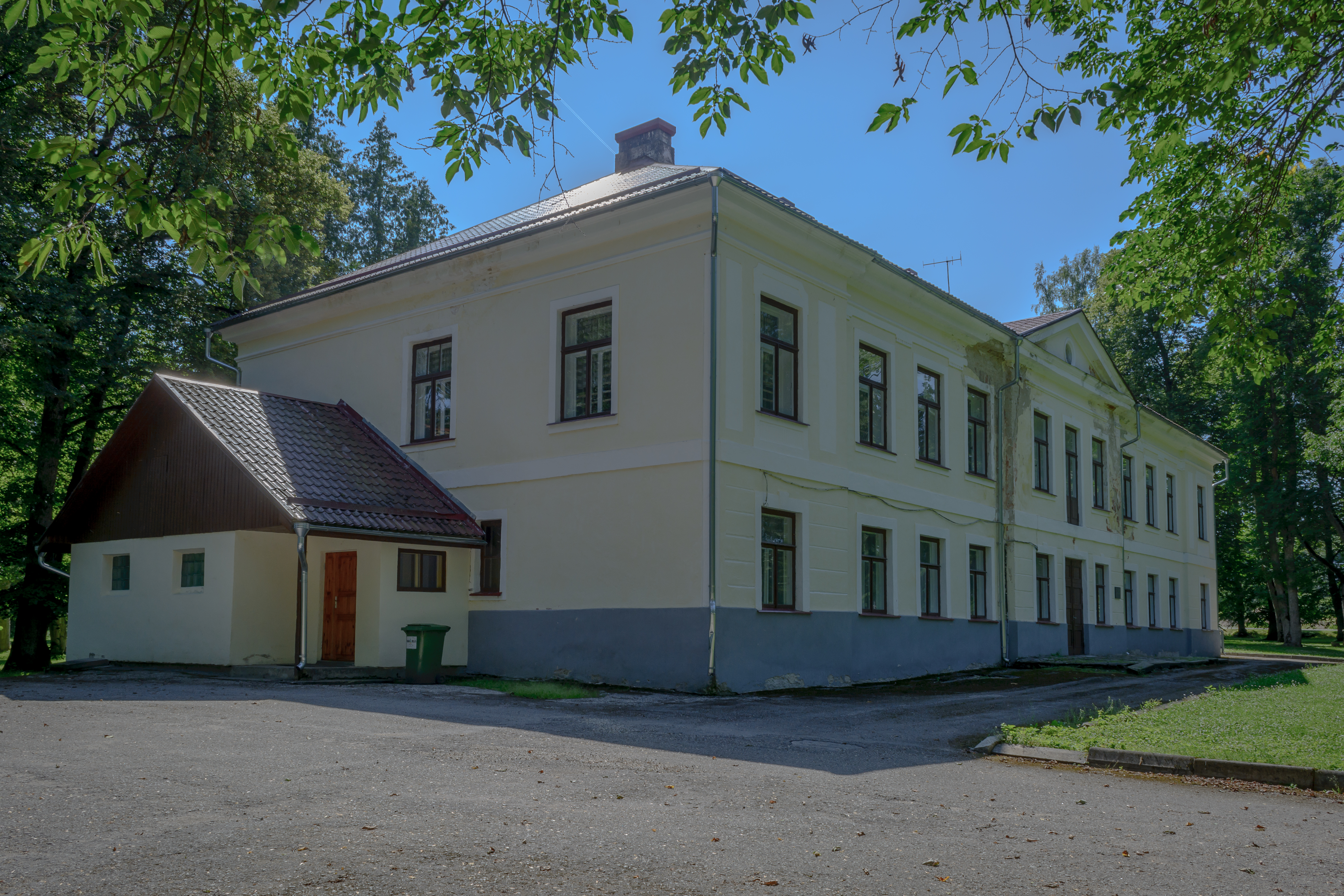
- Salla Manor
- Interactive map of Salla
- Country: Estonia
- County: Lääne-Viru County
- Parish: Väike-Maarja Parish
- Time zone: UTC+2 (EET)
  - Summer (DST): UTC+3 (EEST)

Salla (German: Sall) is a village in Väike-Maarja Parish, Lääne-Viru County, in northeastern Estonia. Salla is famous for its popular music festival Salla Open Air (SOA), held regularly since 2007. SOA 2013 edition's main attraction was Trio Kyrväkkäät (featuring percussion group Suonikkat Kyrväkkäät). Tikkri Pub is the most famous local inn during the festival.
