= Lee Sang-cheol =

South Korean long-distance runner (1935–2018)

Personal information
- Nationality: South Korean
- Born: 1 November 1935 Seoul, South Korea
- Died: October 2018 (aged 82)

Sport
- Sport: Long-distance running
- Event: Marathon

Lee Sang-cheol (1 November 1935 – October 2018) was a South Korean long-distance runner. He competed in the marathon at the 1960 Summer Olympics. Lee died in October 2018, at the age of 82.
