= Henry Barrett =

British long-distance runner

Personal information
- Nationality: British (English)
- Born: 30 December 1879 Hounslow, London, England
- Died: 18 December 1927 (aged 47) Wandsworth, London, England

Sport
- Sport: Athletics
- Event: Long-distance running
- Club: Polytechnic Harriers

Achievements and titles
- Personal bests: Marathon: 2:42:31 (Poly, 1909)

Henry Frederick Barrett (30 December 1879 – 18 December 1927) was a British long-distance runner who competed at two Olympic Games and set a world's best in only his second marathon.

== Biography ==
Barrett represented Great Britain at the 1908 Summer Olympics in London, and failed to finish in the men's marathon.

On 8 May 1909, he set a world's best in only his second marathon with a time of 2:42:31 at the Polytechnic Marathon. (Note: According to the progression of world bests listed by the International Association of Athletics Federations (IAAF), James Clark set a world best of 2:46:52.8 in New York on 12 February 1909, Albert Raines broke Clark's mark with a 2:46:04.6 in New York on 8 May 1909, and Henry Barrett broke Raines' mark with a 2:42:31.0 in London on 26 May 1909. Ian Ridpath, a former director of the Polytechnic marathon, has indicated on his website that some sources have wrongly listed the date of Barrett's performance as 26 May 1909 and has confirmed the true date as 8 May 1909. An article in The Times dated 10 May 1909 provides strong evidence that Ridpath is correct. Given that Barrett's marathon in London most likely concluded before Raines' marathon held on the same date in New York, it is also likely that Barrett rather than Raines broke the world best set by Clark three months earlier.)

Barrett represented Great Britain at the 1912 Summer Olympics in Stockholm, in the men's marathon event and failed to finish again.

Barrett was an electrician from Hounslow.

== Notes ==
Records
Preceded by (United States) Albert Raines	Men's Marathon World Record Holder; 26 May 1909* – 31 August 1909 (*see explanation in the Notes section)	Succeeded by (Sweden) Thure Johansson
