= Sergei Popov (marathon runner) =

Russian marathon runner (1930–1995)

Personal information
- Born: Sergei Konstantinovich Popov; 21 September 1930 Khoronkhoy, Troitskosavsky aimak, Buryat ASSR, Russian SFSR, Soviet Union
- Died: 25 June 1995 (aged 64) Saint Petersburg, Russia
- Height: 160 cm (5 ft 3 in)
- Weight: 55 kg (121 lb)

Sport
- Country: Soviet Union
- Sport: Athletics
- Event: Marathon

Achievements and titles
- Personal best: 2:15:17 (1958)
Medal record
Men's athletics
Representing Soviet Union
European Championships
Gold medal – first place	1958 Stockholm	Marathon

Sergei Konstantinovich Popov (Russian: Сергей Константинович Попов, 21 September 1930 – 25 June 1995) was a Russian marathon runner. He won a gold medal at the 1958 European Championships setting a new world record at 2:15:17; this record stood for more than two years and remained the Soviet national record until 1970. He also set a world record in Moscow, on 15 June 1958, for 30 kilometers, running 1:32:58.8. Popov won the Soviet marathon title in 1957, when he ran the world's fastest marathon of the year in 2:19:50 in Moscow, 1958 and 1959, and placed second in 1962 and third in 1963. In 1959, he set the course record at the Košice Peace Marathon, the third year in a row he ran the world's fastest time. He finished fifth at the 1960 Summer Olympics when the winner, Ethiopia's Abebe Bikila, broke Popov's world record by less than a second.

== Achievements ==
Year	Competition	Venue	Position	Event	Notes
Representing the Soviet Union
1957	Soviet Athletics Championships	Moscow, Soviet Union	1st	Marathon	2:19:50.0
1958	European Championships	Stockholm, Sweden	1st	Marathon	2:15:17.0
1959	Košice Peace Marathon	Košice, Czechoslovakia	1st	Marathon	2:17:45

Records
Preceded by (United Kingdom) James Peters	Men's Marathon World Record Holder; 24 August 1958 – 10 September 1960	Succeeded by (Ethiopia) Abebe Bikila
