= Kim Yeon-beom =

South Korean long-distance runner

Personal information
- Nationality: South Korean
- Born: 10 December 1934 (age 90) Jeollanam, South Korea

Sport
- Sport: Long-distance running
- Event: Marathon

Kim Yeon-beom (born 10 December 1934) is a South Korean former long-distance runner. He competed in the marathon at the 1960 Summer Olympics and the 1964 Summer Olympics.
