= Denis O'Gorman (runner) =

British athlete

Personal information
- Nationality: British
- Born: 22 May 1928 County Tipperary, Ireland
- Died: 2011 (aged 82–83)

Sport
- Sport: Long-distance running
- Event: Marathon

Denis O'Gorman (22 May 1928 – 2011) was a British long-distance runner. He competed in the marathon at the 1960 Summer Olympics.
