= Ivan Filin =

Soviet marathon runner

Medal record

Men's athletics

Representing Soviet Union

European Championships
Silver medal – second place	1958 Stockholm	Marathon
Bronze medal – third place	1954 Bern	Marathon

Ivan Filin (March 10, 1926 – January 12, 2000) was a marathon runner from the Soviet Union, who won the silver medal at the European Championships in Stockholm, Sweden, behind compatriot Sergei Popov. He is a two-time winner of the Soviet national marathon title (1955–1956), and won the 1957 edition of the Košice Peace Marathon. He was born in Kimovsk, Tula Oblast.

== Achievements ==
Year	Competition	Venue	Position	Event	Notes
Representing Soviet Union
1954	European Championships	Bern, Switzerland	3rd	Marathon	2:25:26.6
1957	Košice Peace Marathon	Košice, Czechoslovakia	1st	Marathon	2:23:57
1958	European Championships	Stockholm, Sweden	2nd	Marathon	2:20:50.6
