= Vito Di Terlizzi =

Italian athlete (1930–2021)

Personal information
- Nationality: Italian
- Born: 7 August 1930 Bari, Italy
- Died: 15 April 2021 (aged 90) Bari, Italy

Sport
- Sport: Long-distance running
- Event: Marathon

Vito Di Terlizzi (7 August 1930 – 15 April 2021) was an Italian long-distance runner. He competed in the marathon at the 1960 Summer Olympics.
