= Boris Grishayev =

Russian marathon runner

Personal information
- Born: 25 February 1925 Tsaritsyn, Russian SFSR, Soviet Union
- Died: 1999 (aged 73–74)
- Height: 165 cm (5 ft 5 in)
- Weight: 50 kg (110 lb)

Sport
- Sport: Athletics
- Event: Marathon
- Club: Dynamo Volgograd

Achievements and titles
- Personal best: 2:23:02 (1957)
Medal record
Men's athletics
Representing Soviet Union
European Championships
Silver medal – second place	1954 Bern	Marathon

Boris Andreyevich Grishayev (Russian: Борис Андреевич Гришаев, 25 February 1925 – 1999) was a Russian marathon runner. In 1954 he won the Soviet title and placed second at the European Championships. He competed at the 1956 Summer Olympics but failed to finish.
