= Lothar Beckert =

German long-distance runner (1931–2017)

Personal information
- Nationality: German
- Born: July 26, 1931 Sankt Michaelis, Germany
- Died: 28 April 2017 (aged 85) Berlin, Germany

Sport
- Sport: Long-distance running
- Event: Marathon

Lothar Beckert (26 July 1931 – 28 April 2017) was a German long-distance runner. He competed in the marathon at the 1956 Summer Olympics and the 1960 Summer Olympics.
