= Eino Oksanen =

Finnish marathon runner (1931–2022)

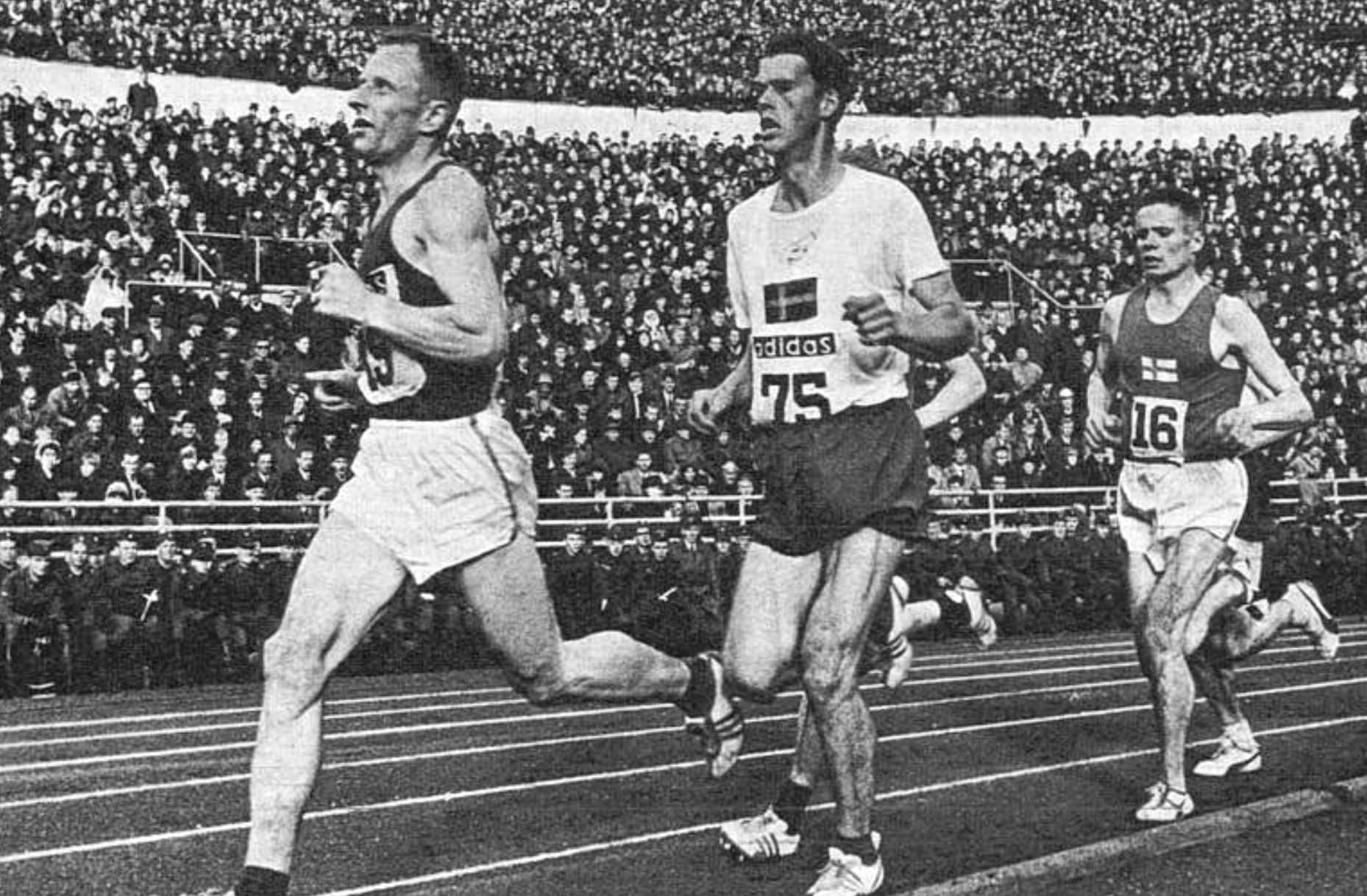
- Oksanen, at left, in a 1964 race

Personal information
- Born: 7 May 1931 Puuppola, Jyväskylän maalaiskunta, Finland
- Died: 10 August 2022 (aged 91) Helsinki, Finland
- Height: 1.72 m (5 ft 8 in)
- Weight: 67 kg (148 lb; 10.6 st)
Medal record
Gold medal – first place	1959 Boston	2:22:42
Gold medal – first place	1959 Athens Peace	2:26:30
Gold medal – first place	1961 Boston	2:23:39
Gold medal – first place	1962 Boston	2:23:48

Eino Ilmari Oksanen (7 May 1931 – 10 August 2022) was a Finnish marathon runner who won the Boston Marathon three times (1959, 1961, and 1962). Oksanen also won the 1957 Turku Marathon in Finland and the 1959 Athens Peace Marathon.

== See also ==
- List of winners of the Boston Marathon
