= Jim Peters (athlete) =

British athlete

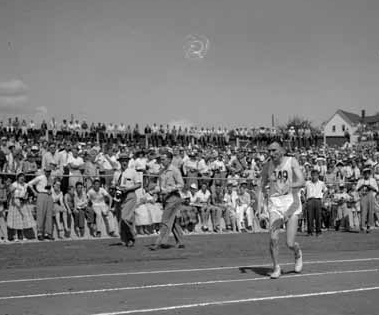
- Peters famously fails to finish the Commonwealth Games marathon in 1954; Attribution:Province newspaper

Personal information
- Nationality: British (English)
- Born: 24 October 1918 Hackney, London, England
- Died: 9 January 1999 (aged 80) Thorpe Bay, Southend-on-Sea, England
- Height: 170 cm (5 ft 7 in)
- Weight: 62 kg (137 lb)

Sport
- Sport: Athletics
- Event: Marathon
- Club: Essex Beagles AC
Medal record
Athletics
Representing England
British Empire & Commonwealth Games
Bronze medal – third place	1954 Vancouver	6 miles

James Henry Peters (24 October 1918 – 9 January 1999) was a long-distance runner from England. He broke the world record for the men's marathon four times during the 1950s. He was the first runner to complete a marathon in under 2 hours 20 minutes; the Association of International Marathons and Distance Races has compared the significance of that barrier to the four-minute mile.

== Biography ==
Peters became the British 6 miles champion after winning the British AAA Championships title at the 1946 AAA Championships. The following year Peters became the British 10 miles champion at the 1947 AAA Championships.

Peters stepped up in distance and began to race marathons, which brought significant success. He won both the 1951 and 1952 AAA marathon titles in Birmingham and London respectively and at the latter broke the world record by recording 2:20:42.2.

In 1953 at the Polytechnic Marathon, a point-to-point race from Windsor to Chiswick, West London, Peters broke the world record again and later the same year, he was the first runner to complete a marathon in under 2 hours 20 minutes, clocking on an out-and-back course at the Enschede Marathon in the Netherlands. He also won his third consecutive AAA marathon title in 1953.

On 26 June 1954, Peters won his fourth AAA title, which was also his fourth world record, setting a time of 2:17:39.4. Then in July he represented the England team at the 1954 British Empire and Commonwealth Games in Vancouver. On 31 July, Peters won a bronze medal in the 6 miles event before taking on the marathon just 7 days later and despite previously carrying a foot injury.

In the Commonwealth Games marathon Peters reached the stadium in first place, believed to be 17 minutes ahead of the next runner and 10 minutes ahead of the Games record but he collapsed seven times (one of the times laying down for over 2 minutes) and he eventually failed to finish, being disqualified after collapsing into the arms of an official. After covering just 200 metres in 11 minutes, he was stretchered away and never raced again. "I was lucky not to have died that day", he later said.

His games kit, including plimsolls and the special medal which following the games the Duke of Edinburgh sent to Jim inscribed "To a most gallant marathon runner." were given to the Sports Hall of Fame, Vancouver, in 1967 for exhibition.

He served as president of the then recently formed Road Runners Club from 1955–1956. After retiring from competitive athletics, Peters worked as an optician in Mitcham, Surrey, and Chadwell Heath, Essex.

== Achievements ==
Year	Competition	Venue	Position	Event	Notes
Representing United Kingdom
1948	Olympic Games	London, United Kingdom	8th	10,000 metres	31:16.0
1952	Polytechnic Marathon	Windsor, Berkshire, United Kingdom	1st	Marathon	2:20:42.2 WR
1952	Olympic Games	Helsinki, Finland	—	Marathon	DNF
1953	Polytechnic Marathon	Windsor, Berkshire, United Kingdom	1st	Marathon	2:18:40.2 WR
1953	Enschede Marathon	Enschede, Netherlands	1st	Marathon	2:19:22
1954	Polytechnic Marathon	Windsor, Berkshire, United Kingdom	1st	Marathon	2:17:39.4 WR

Records
Preceded by (South Korea) Suh Yun-Bok	Men's Marathon World Record Holder; 14 June 1952 – 24 August 1958	Succeeded by (Soviet Union) Sergei Popov
