= Lee Chang-hoon (athlete) =

South Korean long-distance runner

- Hangul: 이창훈
- Hanja: 李昌薰
- RR: I Changhun
- MR: I Ch'anghun

Lee Chang-Hoon (21 March 1935 – 13 January 2004) was a Korean former long-distance runner who competed in the 1956 and 1960 Summer Olympics.
