= 1958 European Athletics Championships – Men's 5000 metres =

Men's 5000 metres at the European Athletics Championships

The men's 5000 metres at the 1958 European Athletics Championships was held in Stockholm, Sweden, at Stockholms Olympiastadion on 21 and 23 August 1958.

== Medalists ==
Gold	Zdzisław Krzyszkowiak; Poland
Silver	Kazimierz Zimny; Poland
Bronze	Gordon Pirie; Great Britain

== Results ==
=== Final ===
23 August

Rank	Name	Nationality	Time	Notes
1st place, gold medalist(s)	Zdzisław Krzyszkowiak	Poland	13:53.4	CR
2nd place, silver medalist(s)	Kazimierz Zimny	Poland	13:55.2	
3rd place, bronze medalist(s)	Gordon Pirie	Great Britain	14:01.6	
4	Peter Clark	Great Britain	14:03.8	
5	Aleksandr Artynyuk	Soviet Union	14:05.6	
6	Sándor Iharos	Hungary	14:07.2	
7	Miroslav Jurek	Czechoslovakia	14:12.2	
8	Friedrich Janke	East Germany	14:17.0	
9	Michel Bernard	France	14:18.4	
10	Miklós Szabó	Hungary	14:29.4	
11	Hubert Pärnäkivi	Soviet Union	14:34.8	
12	Ludwig Müller	West Germany	14:34.8	

=== Heats ===
21 August

==== Heat 1 ====
Rank	Name	Nationality	Time	Notes
1	Sándor Iharos	Hungary	14:05.6	Q
2	Michel Bernard	France	14:05.8	NR Q
3	Kazimierz Zimny	Poland	14:08.0	Q
4	Gordon Pirie	Great Britain	14:08.4	Q
5	Ludwig Müller	West Germany	14:08.8	Q
6	Hubert Pärnäkivi	Soviet Union	14:09.0	Q
7	Eero Tuomaala	Finland	14:10.8	
8	Hein Cuje	Netherlands	14:12.8	
9	Albert Messitt	Ireland	14:14.8	NR
10	Marcel Vandewattyne	Belgium	14:18.2	
11	Sven Lundgren	Sweden	14:27.6	
12	Thyge Thøgersen	Denmark	14:29.0	
13	Christos Chiotis	Greece	14:33.6	
14	José Molina	Spain	14:57.8	

==== Heat 2 ====
Rank	Name	Nationality	Time	Notes
1	Aleksandr Artynyuk	Soviet Union	14:06.8	Q
2	Peter Clark	Great Britain	14:09.6	Q
3	Miklós Szabó	Hungary	14:12.2	Q
4	Zdzisław Krzyszkowiak	Poland	14:12.4	Q
5	Miroslav Jurek	Czechoslovakia	14:12.4	Q
6	Friedrich Janke	East Germany	14:12.4	Q
7	Jorma Kakko	Finland	14:16.4	
8	Maurice Chiclet	France	14:17.0	
9	Manuel Alonso	Spain	14:18.0	NR
10	Joep Delnoye	Netherlands	14:18.4	
11	Eugène Allonsius	Belgium	14:24.2	

== Participation ==
According to an unofficial count, 25 athletes from 16 countries participated in the event.

- Belgium (2)
- Czechoslovakia (1)
- Denmark (1)
- East Germany (1)
- Finland (2)
- France (2)
- Greece (1)
- Hungary (2)
- Ireland (1)
- Netherlands (2)
- Poland (2)
- Soviet Union (2)
- Spain (2)
- Sweden (1)
- Great Britain (2)
- West Germany (1)
