= Athletics at the 1960 Summer Olympics – Men's 10,000 metres =

Men's 10,000 metres at the Games of the XVII Olympiad
- Venue: Olympic Stadium
- Dates: September 8, 1960
- Winning time: 28:32.18 OR

Medalists
1st place, gold medalist(s)		Pyotr Bolotnikov; Soviet Union
2nd place, silver medalist(s)		Hans Grodotzki; United Team of Germany
3rd place, bronze medalist(s)		Dave Power; Australia

The men's 10,000 metres long distance event at the 1960 Olympic Games took place on September 8. The event was held in a final only format.

== Results ==
=== Final ===
Rank	Name	Nationality	Time	Notes
1st place, gold medalist(s)	Pyotr Bolotnikov	Soviet Union	28:32.18	OR
2nd place, silver medalist(s)	Hans Grodotzki	United Team of Germany	28:37.22	
3rd place, bronze medalist(s)	Dave Power	Australia	28:37.65	
4	Aleksey Desyatchikov	Soviet Union	28:39.72	
5	Murray Halberg	New Zealand	28:49.11	
6	Max Truex	United States	28:50.34	
7	Zdzisław Krzyszkowiak	Poland	28:52.75	
8	John Merriman	Great Britain	28:52.89	
9	Martin Hyman	Great Britain	29:05.11	
10	Gordon Pirie	Great Britain	29:15.49	
11	Sándor Iharos	Hungary	29:16.07	
12	Gerhard Hönicke	United Team of Germany	29:20.14	
13	Robert Bogey	France	29:22.53	
14	Rhadi Ben Abdesselam	Morocco	29:32.00	
15	József Kovács II	Hungary	29:34.71	
16	Yevgeny Zhukov	Soviet Union	29:42.20	
17	Xaver Höger	United Team of Germany	29:50.20	
18	Stanisław Ożóg	Poland	29:58.00	
19	Arere Anentia	Kenya	30:01.00	
20	Constantin Grecescu	Romania	30:03.00	
21	Simo Saloranta	Finland	30:04.80	
22	Hamoud Ameur	France	30:12.40	
23	Hamida Addèche	France	30:25.40	
24	Doug Kyle	Canada	30:27.20	
25	Carlos Pérez	Spain	30:31.60	
26	Barry Magee	New Zealand	30:35.80	
27	Franco Antonelli	Italy	30:39.40	
28	Cyprian Tseriwa	Rhodesia	30:47.80	
29	Fevzi Pakel	Turkey	32:06.50	
	Kazimierz Zimny	Poland	DNF	
	Gebru Merawi	Ethiopia	DNF	
	Jaroslav Bohatý	Czechoslovakia	DNF	
	Allan Lawrence	Australia	DNF	
	Kulwant Arora	India	DNS	
	Ioannis Glezos	Greece	DNS	
	Song Sam	South Korea	DNS	
	José Aceituno	Chile	DNS	
	Hedwig Leenaert	Belgium	DNS	
	George De Peana	Guyana	DNS	
	Katsuo Nishida	Japan	DNS	
	Myitung Naw	Burma	DNS	
	Linus Diaz	Sri Lanka	DNS	
	Miroslav Jurek	Czechoslovakia	DNS	
	Nguyễn Văn Lý	Vietnam	DNS	
