= 1959 USA–USSR Track and Field Dual Meet =

- Dates: July 18–19, 1959
- Host city: Philadelphia, United States
- Level: Senior
- Type: Outdoor

The 1959 USA–USSR Track and Field Dual Meet was an international track and field competition between the Soviet Union and the United States. The second in a series of meetings between the nations, it was held on July 18–19 in Philadelphia, United States, and finished with Soviet Union beating the United States 175 to 167. The meet marked an unusual head-to-head for the nations during the Cold War. The men's 10,000 meters drew attention as the American competitor Bob Soth collapsed in the heat mid-race – an event which was filmed and presented in the Soviet documentary Sport, Sport, Sport (Russian: Спорт, спорт, спорт).

== Results ==
=== Teams ===
Class	Soviet Union	United States
Men	108	121
Women	67	40
Total	175	167

=== Men ===
Event	Winner	Result	Nation
100 m	Ray Norton	10.3	United States
200 m	Ray Norton	20.7	United States
400 m	Eddie Southern	46.2	United States
800 m	Tom Murphy	1:48.5	United States
1500 m	Dyrol Burleson	3:49.4	United States
5000 m	Aleksandr Artynyuk	14:17.8	Soviet Union
10,000 m	Aleksey Desyatchikov	31:40.6	Soviet Union
110 m hurdles	Hayes Jones	13.6	United States
400 m hurdles	Josh Culbreath	50.5	United States
3000 m steeplechase	Semyon Rzhishchin	7:51.6	Soviet Union
4 × 100 m relay			United States
4 × 400 m relay		3:07.0	United States
20 kilometres walk	Volodymyr Holubnychy	1:38:20.2	Soviet Union
High jump	Robert Shavlakadze	2.06 m	Soviet Union
Pole vault	Don Bragg	4.64 m	United States
Long jump	Greg Bell	8.10 m	United States
Triple jump	Konstantin Tsigankov	15.95 m	Soviet Union
Shot put	Parry O'Brien	19.27 m	United States
Discus throw	Al Oerter	57.53 m	United States
Hammer throw	Vasily Rudenkov	66.76 m	Soviet Union
Javelin throw	Al Cantello	79.99 m	United States

=== Women ===
Event	Winner	Result	Nation
100 metres	Barbara Jones	11.7	United States
200 metres	Lucinda Williams	23.4	United States
800 metres	Lyudmila Lysenko	2:11.3	Soviet Union
80 metres hurdles	Galina Bystrova	11.0	Soviet Union
4 × 100 m relay		44.8	Soviet Union
High jump	Taisia Chenchik	1.778 m	Soviet Union
Long jump	Vera Krepkina	6.17 m	Soviet Union
Shot put	Tamara Press	16.94 m	Soviet Union
Discus throw	Nina Ponomaryova	55.21 m	Soviet Union
Javelin throw	Birutė Zalogaitytė	55.37 m	Soviet Union
