= KSV Hessen Kassel =

German football club

- Full name: Kasseler Sport-Verein Hessen Kassel e. V.
- Nickname: Die Löwen
- Founded: 1893 (133 years ago)
- Ground: Auestadion
- Capacity: 18,737
- Chairman: Jens Rose
- Manager: René Klingbeil
- League: Regionalliga Südwest (IV)
- 2025–26: Regionalliga Südwest, 6th of 18
- Website: https://www.ksvhessen.de
Home colours	Away colours

KSV Hessen Kassel is a semi-professional German football club based in Kassel, Hesse. KSV competes in the German Regionalliga Südwest, the fourth tier of German football. Nicknamed "Die Löwen" (the lions), the club was founded as FC Union 93 Kassel in 1893. A series of mergers, insolvency and re-starts led to the club known today being re-formed on 3 February 1998. The club's colours are red and white and their home ground since 1953 has been the Auestadion, located in the southwest of the city of Kassel next to the historic Karlsaue park.

== History ==
The club was founded as FC Union 93 Kassel in 1893 and just two years later joined FC Hassia 93 Cassel to form Casseler FV 95. In 1919, fusion with VfK Kassel created SV Kurhessen Kassel. It was as Kurhessen that the club joined the Gauliga Hessen, one of sixteen top flight divisions established in the re-organization of German football in 1933 under the Third Reich. They were relegated at the end of the 1935–36 season and made their way back in 1938, but continued to perform poorly, narrowly missing relegation in subsequent seasons. They earned their best result in 1942 in the newly formed Gauliga Kurhessen, finishing just two points shy of division winners 1. SV Borussia 04 Fulda. In 1944, they joined CSC 03 Kassel to form the combined wartime side KSG SV Kurhessen/CSC 03 Kassel and again finished two points behind the division leaders, this time in third place on goal difference. The Gauliga Kurhessen was re-organized into three groups for the following season, and the club was assigned to the Gruppe Kassel, but the region was overtaken by World War II, bringing a stop to league play.

After the war, SVKK was one of a number of clubs merged to form the Gründung der Sportgruppe Süd, an association active in a number of sports. This club became VfL Kassel in 1946, and finally, merged with Kasseler SV Kassel in November 1947 to become today's KSV Hessen Kassel.

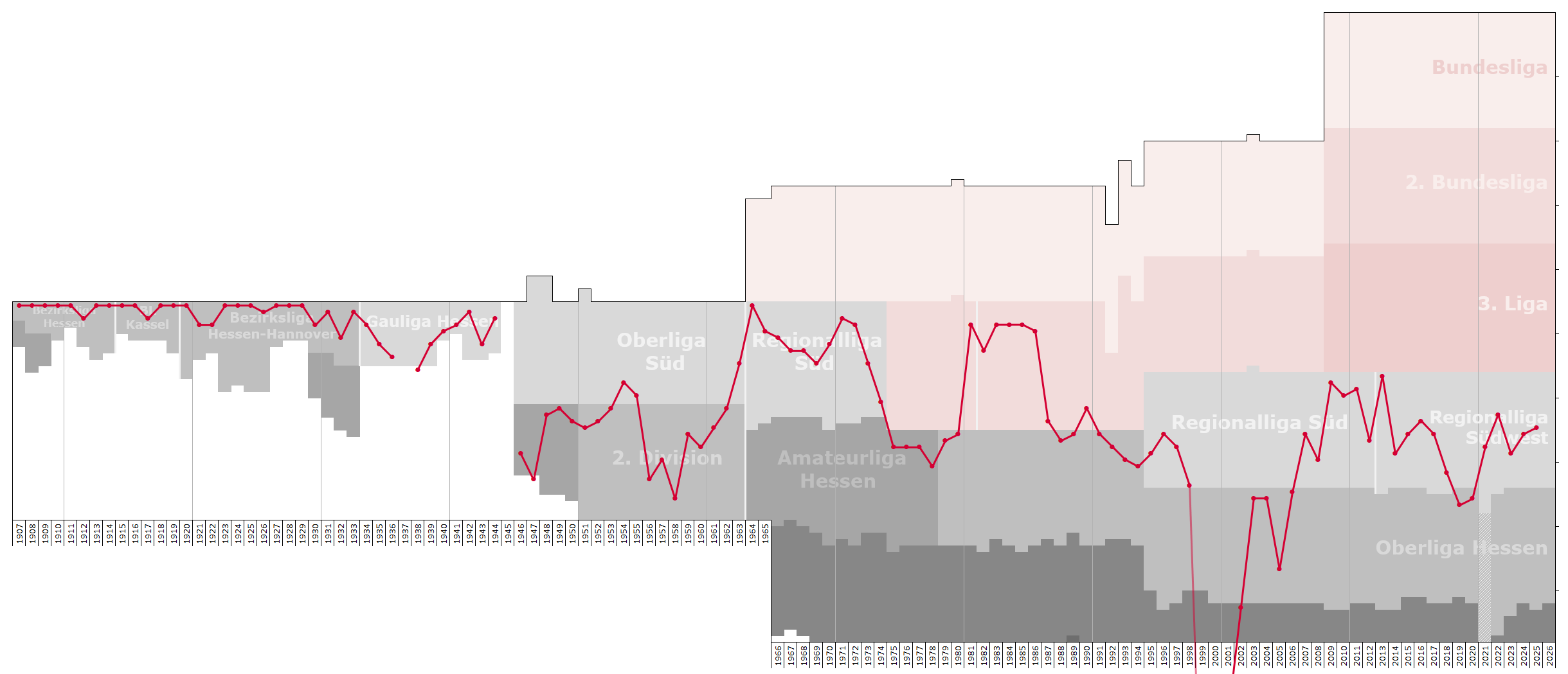
Historical chart of Hessen Kassel league performance

Kassel quickly established themselves as a stolid, but largely unremarked, second-tier side. They played their way into what was at the time the first tier Oberliga Süd and then found themselves in the Regionalliga Süd (II) after the formation in 1963 of Germany's new premier level professional league, the Bundesliga. A first place Regionalliga finish in 1964 saw them compete unsuccessfully in the promotion rounds for the Bundesliga. The club continued to play tier II ball until the mid 70s when their performance dropped them to Amateur Oberliga Hessen (III) until the start of the next decade brought an advance to the 2. Bundesliga. Through the 80s, the team flirted with promotion to the senior circuit, but could never quite put themselves over the top. In 1985 the club just missed being promoted: a loss to Nurenburg (0–2) in the last game of the season against wins by three other clubs in the hunt saw Kassel left behind.

Those runs at the Bundesliga in the 80s, alongside an advance to the quarter-final of the DFB-Pokal in 1991, represent the apex of the team's achievement. The club was bankrupted in 1993 and the football side set off on its own as FC Hessen Kassel. They too had financial problems and in 1998 also found themselves bankrupt, but this time plunged all the way down to Kreisliga Hessen A (VIII). Kassel began their recovery by going unbeaten over the course of the next two seasons and advanced to the Oberliga Hessen (IV) which they won in 2005–06 to earn a promotion to the Regionalliga (III). In 2007–08, they failed to qualify for the new 3. Liga, remaining in the Regionaliga Süd, now tier four. They came close to promotion once more in 2010–11 but narrowly failed finishing third.

At the end of the 2011–12 season the club was grouped into the new Regionalliga Südwest, which replaced the Regionalliga Süd in the region. In 2012–13 the club won the inaugural championship of the new league and qualified for the promotion play-off to the 3. Liga.

Die Löwen lost their play-off tie for promotion to the 3. Liga over two legs to Holstein Kiel who finished the 2012–13 season as champions of Regionalliga Nord. Kassel lost the first game of the tie away at the Holstein-Stadion in Kiel 2–0. In the return leg in Kassel, the club lost 2–1 at the Auestadion in front of 17,000 fans. The following season the club was not able to challenge for the championship, only finishing 13th.

== Players ==
=== Current squad ===
As of 24 September 2026

Note: Flags indicate national team as defined under FIFA eligibility rules; some limited exceptions apply. Players may hold more than one non-FIFA nationality.

No.	Pos.	Nation	Player
1	GK	GER	Jonas Nickisch
3	DF	GER	Joshua Kopf
4	DF	GER	Tim Knipping
5	DF	GER	Tyron Duah
6	MF	GER	Aaron Liesche Prieto
7	MF	GER	Emre Böyükata
10	MF	TUR	Sercan Sararer
11	MF	GER	Phinees Bonianga
12	GK	GER	Nicolas Gröteke
13	FW	GER	Leon Damer
17	MF	GER	Adrian Bravo Sanchez
18	FW	GER	Silas Hagemann
19	MF	GER	Eric Fuchs
20	MF	MNE	Mirnes Pepić

No.	Pos.	Nation	Player
22	MF	GER	Dildar Diego Suleyman
23	MF	GER	Finn Bindbeutel
24	MF	GER	Cemal Kaymaz
26	DF	GER	Luis Podolski
27	DF	GER	Tobias Boche
29	FW	GER	Cemal Sezer
31	DF	GER	Maurice Springfeld
32	DF	GER	Nael Najjar
33	MF	GER	Nick Rothweiler (on loan from Heidenheim)
34	GK	GER	Finn Sauer
37	FW	GER	Joel Richter
39	GK	GER	Franz Langhoff
-	GK	GER	Eric Oelschlägel

=== Out on loan ===
Note: Flags indicate national team as defined under FIFA eligibility rules; some limited exceptions apply. Players may hold more than one non-FIFA nationality.

No.	Pos.	Nation	Player

=== Reserve team ===
The club's reserve team, KSV Hessen Kassel II, has played in the Verbandsliga Hessen-Nord since 2009. The team's greatest success has been to win the Hesse Cup in 1961 and finish runners-up in the Amateurliga Hessen in 1968.

=== International footballers ===
Below is a list of former and current international footballers who have played at least 1 match for a FIFA recognised country at senior or U21 level while contracted to the club.

Player	Country	Caps	Goals	Active
Gustav Hensel	Germany	1	0	1908
Heinrich 'Heini' Weber	Germany	12	0	1928–31
Karl-Heinz Metzner	West Germany	2	0	1952–53
Dieter Hecking	West Germany U21	12	8	1985–86
Harez Arian Habib	Afghanistan	13	4	2007–12
Alban Meha	Albania/Kosovo	9	2	2005–2024
Faton Xhemaili	Albania U21	1	0	2018–present

== Staff ==
=== Current staff ===
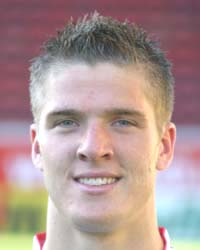
Former KSV forward Tobias Damm was the Kassel head coach from 2019 to 2023. He guided the team back into Regionalliga in 2020.

For 2024/25 season

As of 5 November 2023

Role	Staff
Head coach	(Germany) René Klingbeil
Assistant coach	(Germany) Sebastian Busch
Assistant coach	(Germany) Mirko Dickhaut
Goalkeeper coach	(Germany) Christoph Wiegand
Goalkeeper coach	(Germany) Michael Gibhardt

Role	Staff
Director of football	(Germany) Jörg Müller
Team manager	(Germany) Michael Voss
Team official	(Germany) Alfred Gäßler
Kit manager	(Germany) Uwe Heller

Role	Staff
Club doctor	(Germany) Thomas Krause
Club doctor	(Germany) Markus Schott
Physiotherapist	(Germany) Christian Bielert
Physiotherapist	(Germany) Nina Klaus

=== Club managers ===
All managers of the club since 1946:

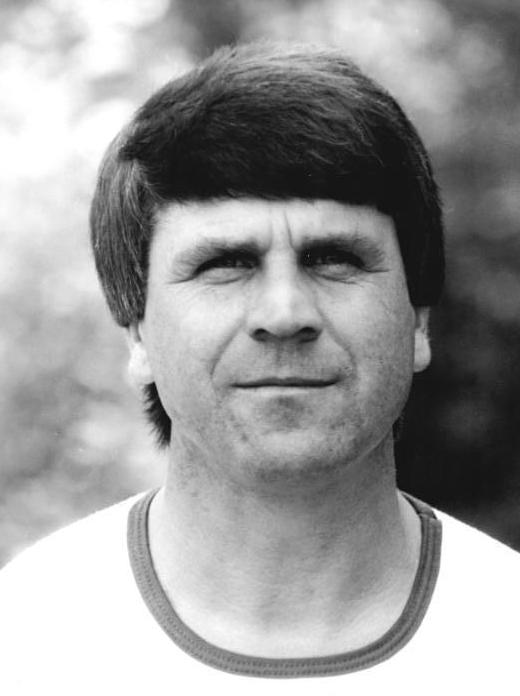
Hans-Ulrich Thomale has twice been manager of Hessen Kassel. He guided the club to their best ever finish in the DFB-Pokal in 1991, reaching the quarter-final stage where Kassel was knocked out by SV Werder Bremen 2–0.

Manager	Term
(Germany) Fritz Kleim	1946–1947
(Germany) Ernst Paulus	1947–1949
(Germany) Karl Höger	1949–1950
(Germany) Lothar Schröder	1950–1952
(Germany) Rudi Gellesch	1952–1955
(Germany) Walter Koch	1955–1956
(Germany) Hans Carl	1956–1958
(Germany) Jupp Kratz	1958–1960
(Austria) Willibald Hahn	1960–1962
(Germany) Walter Müller	1962–1964
(Germany) Herbert Widmayer	1964–1966
(Germany) Toni Hellwig	1966–1968
(Germany) Willy Kurrat	1968–1969
(Germany) Heinz Baas	1969–1971
(Germany) Toni Hellwig	1971
(Germany) Hans-Wilhelm Loßmann	1971–1972
(Germany) Toni Hellwig	1972–1973
(Germany) Heinz Baas	1973–1974
(Germany) Klaus Kuhnert	1974
(Germany) Robert Gebhardt	1974–1976

Manager	Term
(Germany) Walter Müller	1976
(Hungary) Gyula Tóth	1976–1978
(Germany) Rudi Kröner	1978–1982
(Germany) Timo Konietzka	1982–1983
(Germany) Jörg Berger	1983–1986
(Germany) Rudi Kröner	1986
(Germany) Jürgen Nehme	1986
(Germany) Elmar Müller	1986
(Germany) Werner Biskup	1987
(Germany) Holger Brück	1987
(Germany) Franz Brungs	1987–1989
(Germany) Lorenz-Günther Köstner	1989–1990
(Germany) Hans-Ulrich Thomale	1990–1992
(Germany) Karl-Heinz Wolf	1992–1993
(Germany) Franz Brungs	1993–1995
(Germany) Holger Brück	1995–1996
(Germany) Hans-Jürgen Gede	1996
(Germany) Hans-Werner Moors	1997
(Germany) Horst Schmidt	1997
(Germany) Jörg Müller	1998–2000

Manager	Term
(Germany) Holger Brück (Note: Interim head coach)	2000–2001
(United Kingdom) Terry Scott	2001
(Germany) Holger Brück	2001
(Germany) Oliver Roggensack	2001–2003
(Germany) Thomas Freudenstein	2003–2004
(Germany) Hans-Ulrich Thomale	2004
(Germany) Bernd Sturm	2004–2005
(Germany) Matthias Hamann	2005–2008
(Germany) Mirko Dickhaut	2008–2011
(Germany) Christian Hock	2011
(Germany) Holger Brück	2011
(Germany) Uwe Wolf	2012–2013
(Germany) Jörn Großkopf	2013
(Germany) Sven Hoffmeister	2013
(Germany) Matthias Mink	2014–2016
(Germany) Tobias Cramer	2016–2019
(Germany) Dietmar Hirsch	2019
(Germany) Tobias Damm	2019–2023
(Germany) Alexander Kiene	2023–2024
(Germany) André Schubert	2024
(Germany) René Klingbeil	2024–Present

== Club identity ==
=== Supporters ===
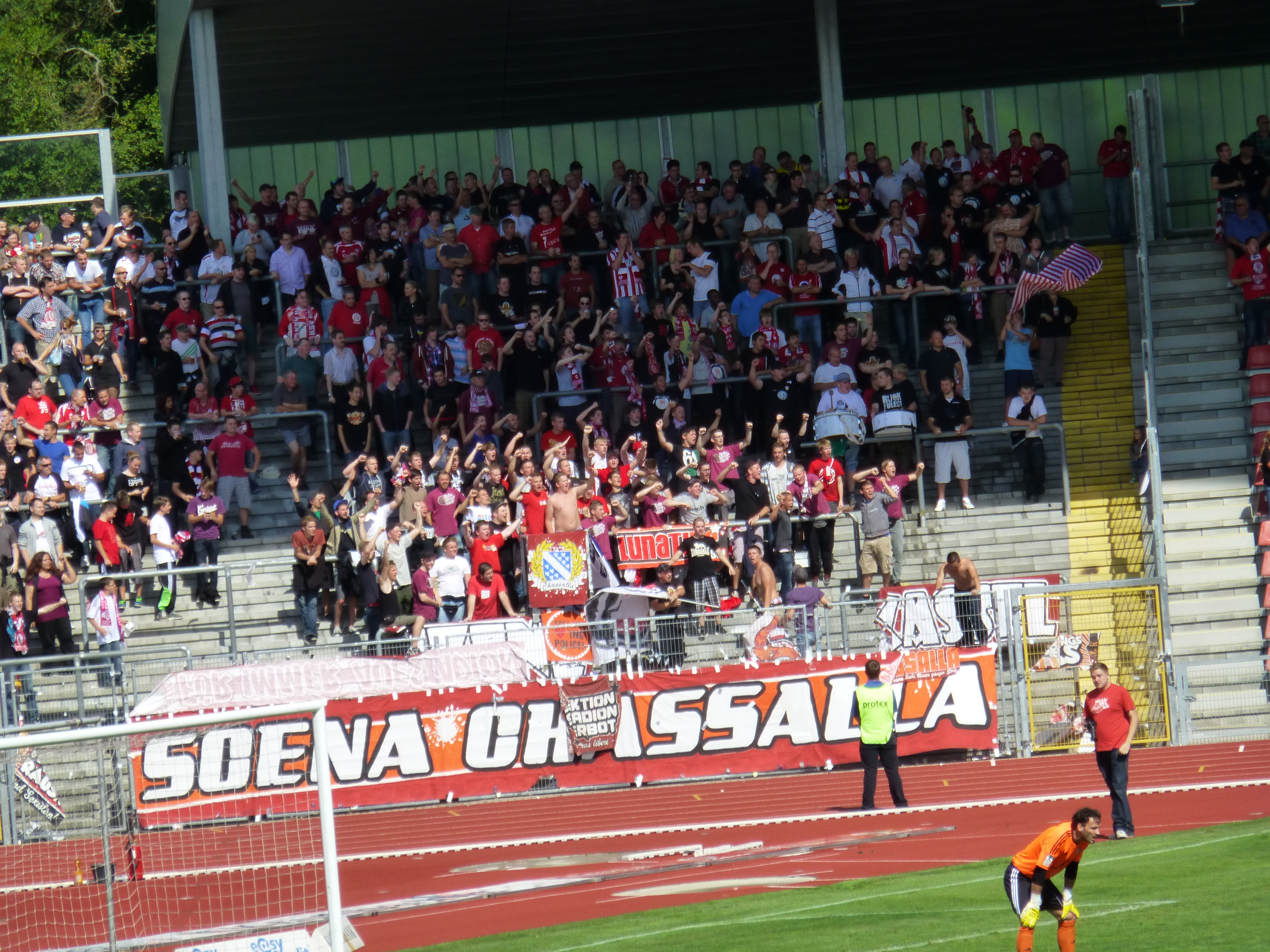
Block 30 at a home KSV match in 2012 vs Elversberg in the Regionalliga.

KSV Hessen Kassel has a number of organised and un-organised fan groups, ultras and blocks. Most notably, Block 30, Huddich Bande Ultras and Block 36.

Named after the block affiliated members meet and watch KSV in the Auestadion, Block 30 is organised and represents an array of different kinds of fans. Its purpose is to support KSV Hessen Kassel, promote German football supporter culture and connect with other supporter groups in Germany on important regional football issues. In March 2019 it joined with twelve other clubs ranging from 3.Liga (III) to Oberliga (V) level to establish a working group to determine a unified position and list of recommendations to take to the DFB on proposed reforms to the regional football structure in Germany.

Block 36 is a group of KSV Hessen Kassel fans and the group is not a formal organization hence it includes both members of established fan clubs and independent fans. The club is managed with transparency and a focus on mutual respect. The group's goal is for KSV Hessen Kassel to return to a professional league level in Germany while maintaining its identity as a regional football club.

Since 2008 there has been an unofficial friendship formed between Kassel's Block 30 and Huddich Bande Ultras and Holstein Kiel’s supporter group Block 501. In 2018, to celebrate ten years of friendship, the two sets of fans combined and attended one KSV Hessen Kassel match and one Holstein Kiel match together. They dubbed the weekend the brothers for life celebration.

=== Facilities ===
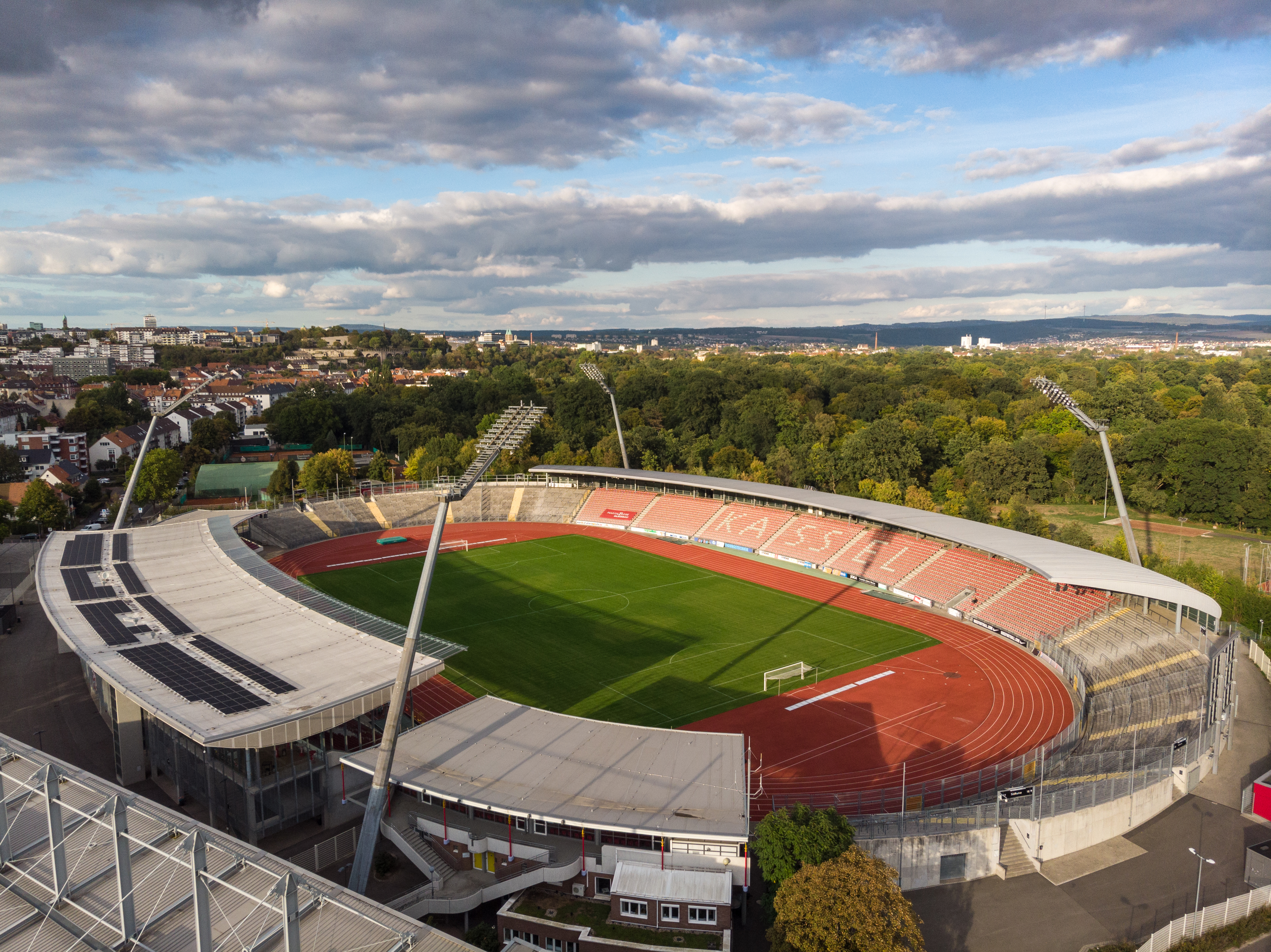
Aerial view of Auestadion, taken in 2018.

KSV Hessen Kassel's current home ground is the 18,737 capacity Auestadion. The stadium has predominantly been the club's home ground since being built in 1953. Hessen Kassel inaugurated Auestadion on the stadium's opening on 23 August 1953. KSV played a football match against Bavarian team Viktoria Aschaffenburg in front of 20,000 spectators. Kassel lost the match two goals to one. The Auestadion is a multi-purpose facility with a 106 × 65 m football pitch located in the middle of a full athletic running track. The stadium has 8,700 seats and terracing that can accommodate for a little over 10,000 spectators standing. Auestadion has had three major renovations since being built, the last being a new grandstand, forecourt and video wall constructed between 2009 and 2011. The ground is located in the Southwest of the city near the historic Karlsaue park and Eissporthalle Kassel ice sports stadium. It can be reached by both local and regional Kassel tram lines: 5, 6 and RT5.

KSV Hessen Kassel holds the attendance record for the Auestadion. The official record stands at 37,000 attendance at the 1964 Bundesliga promotion play-off match between KSV Hessen Kassel and Hannover 96. Kassel lost to the match 2–1. There was however a report of 40,000 people attending a DFB-Pokal match in January 1965 at the stadium. KSV played Bundesliga club Hamburger SV (HSV, Hamburg) and lost 2–0 with goals to Uwe Seeler (12th minute) and Charly Dörfel (57th minute). The official crowd number was 33,000 but Kassel police reported there was 40,000 spectators in attendance. The number of fans buckled the railings in the standing areas. Children were passed down onto the playing ground to ensure their safety. The right hand side gate of the grandstand was pushed down and fans flooded into the playing area. The stewards and the police were powerless, and spectators were standing all around the corner flags. The referee, Wilfried Hilker, delayed the start of the match so authorities could regain control and push the fans back from the edge of the field but eventually he got the match underway when it became apparent this was impossible to do.

Prior to the Auestadion construction in the 1950s, KSV played at the A-Platz. Known officially as the Kurhessen sports facility, the A-Platz was inaugurated in 1922 with a capacity of 16,000 spectators. The A-Platz was demolished after the completion of the Auestadion.

Following the club's insolvency in 1998 and relegation from the third division to the eighth division, KSV relocated to one of the outfields within the Auestadion precinct. The G-Platz had a capacity of 2,000 spectators and was affectionately known as the "lion cage" by the Hessen Kassel fans.

=== Other sporting departments ===
Until 1993 KSV Hessen Kassel was a multi-sport club with sporting departments in football, athletics, badminton, tennis and table tennis among others. Hessen Kassel had a total of twenty three amateur departments. KSV produced a number of German champions and Olympians throughout these different disciplines. The club's bankruptcy in 1993 brought an end to KSV continuing as a multi-sport club. When the club was re-established it was brought back as a purely football club, FC Hessen Kassel. When the club re-emerged as KSV Hessen Kassel in 1998 it remained just a football club.

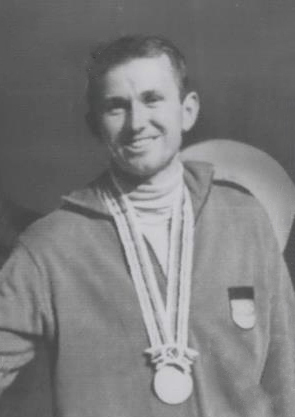
A picture of KSV's Klaus Lehnertz with his bronze medal for pole vaulting at the 1964 Olympic Games.

Athletics department

The club was used as the performance centre for athletics for the state of Hesse until 1993. During this time, KSV produced nine German champions, one European champion, one Commonwealth Games gold medallist and four Olympians from within its athletics department. These included:

- Anna Klooss (née Hagemann), represented Germany at the 1936 Olympic Games in discus throwing. She was ranked as one of the top three discus throwers in German championships between 1936 and 1948 and she became German champion in 1946.
- Irmgard Schmelzer (née Kirchhoff), represented Germany at the 1952 Olympic Games in long jump. She finished fourth in the event with a distance of 5.9m. Irmgard also became the 1952 German champion in long jump.
- Ludwig Müller, represented Germany at the 1960 Olympic Games in the men's 3000 metres steeplechase. Ludwig qualified for the final second from his heat before finishing sixth in the final. Müller was a middle-distance runner who became German champion in 1963.
- Josef Klik, represented West Germany in the 1962 European Athletics Championships in discus throwing. He finished 18th in the qualification event, missing out on a spot in the final. Josef became German champion in 1964.
- Horst Flosbach, represented Germany at the 1960 Olympic Games in the men's 5000 metres running race. Horst won his heat to advance to the final and finished eighth in the final. Flosbach was a long-distance runner who then became German champion in the 10,000 metres in 1964.
- Gerd Loßdörfer, represented West Germany at the 1966 European Athletics Championships in 400 metres hurdles. Gerd won the silver medal in the event, finishing 0.5 seconds behind world number one Roberto Frinolli. Loßdörfer became German champion in hurdles in 1966.
- Klaus Lehnertz, represented Germany at the 1964 Olympic Games in pole vaulting. Lehnertz won the bronze medal in the event with 5.00 metres best mark. Klaus also represented West Germany at the European Championships in 1962 and 1966 as well as the European Cup in 1965 and 1967. He won silver in 1965 and bronze in 1967. Lehnertz was also the German champion in pole vaulting for three straight years between 1966 and 1968.
- Hans-Jürgen Ziegler, represented West Germany at the 1971 European Championships and 1973 European indoor championships in pole vaulting. Ziegler finished eleventh in 1971 but won silver in 1973. He was also German pole vaulting champion in 1971 as well as German indoor champion in 1971 and 1972.
- Don Baird, represented Australia at the 1974 and 1978 Commonwealth Games in pole vaulting. Baird won the gold medal in 1974 and silver in 1978. Don also represented Australia at the 1977 IAAF World Cup. He finished fourth at the World Cup. Baird was also the German champion at pole vaulting in 1974.

Badminton department

KSV's badminton department produced successful individual players during its time of operation. Most notable was Maren Schröder, who won thirteen Hesse and three Southwest German titles. Anke Jaskolla and Ulrich Schaper also won Hesse championships. The department was dissolved in 1993 and the players left and started the independent Badminton Club Kassel e. V (BV Kassel) on 7 July 1993.

Tennis department

KSV Hessen Kassel's tennis department was established in 1978 and remained operational until 1993. The club originally built three clay tennis courts and a small wooden clubhouse, adding a fourth later on, to the south of the Auestadion. In 1990 with increased members the club built a new large modern clubhouse. Once KSV declared bankruptcy in 1993, the tennis department and the majority of its member players broke away from KSV and founded a new independent club named Tennis-Club-Auepark Kassel eV (TC-Auepark Kassel eV).

Table tennis department

The table tennis department was founded as CT Hessen-Prussia in 1936 as the first table tennis department of any Kassel sports club. The department ceased operating during the Second World War but restarted on 17 November 1945 following the conclusion of the war. In 1946 it merged into the singular club name of KSV Hessen Kassel. It was one of the leading table tennis clubs in Northern Hesse at the time. KSV, in particular, excelled in women's table tennis. In 1967 KSV Hessen Kassel was promoted to the top division in the region, Oberliga Südwest. Kassel remained in the top division for four years before being relegated in 1971. In 1972 the women's Bundesliga was introduced in table tennis, KSV now found themselves in the third division. After eight seasons, Hessen Kassel got promoted to the second division in 1979, which was now called Regionalliga Südwest. In 1981 the division was renamed 2.Bundesliga. Kassel was again relegated in 1982 but was swiftly promoted again and remained in 2.Bundasliga for the rest of the 1980s. In 1993. Following the club's bankruptcy, the table tennis department left KSV and established its own independent club, TTC Kassel. The new club played in the first division for two years but withdrew from the second division and folded in 1997.

== Honours ==
=== League ===
- 2. Oberliga Süd (II)
  - Champions: 1962
  - Runners-up: 1953
- Regionalliga Süd (II)
  - Champions: 1964
- Regionalliga Süd (IV)
  - Runners-up: 2009
- Regionalliga Südwest (IV)
  - Champions: 2013
- Oberliga Hessen (III–V)
  - Champions: 1949, 1980, 1989, 1991, 2006
  - Runners-up: 1968^{‡}, 1988, 2003, 2004, 2020
- Landesliga Hessen-Nord (IV/V)
  - Champions: 1967^{‡}, 1971^{‡}, 1984^{‡}, 1989^{‡}, 1995^{‡}, 2002
  - Runners-up: 2011^{‡}

=== Cup ===
- Hesse Cup (Tiers III–VII)
  - Winners: 1961^{‡}, 2015
  - Runners-up: 1948, 1968^{‡}, 1975, 2010, 2011, 2018, 2025
- ^{‡} Won by reserve team

== Season-by-season record ==
The season-by-season performance of the club since re-establishment in February 1998:

Season	Division	Tier	Position
1998–99	Kreisliga A	VIII	1st ↑
1999–00	Bezirksliga	VII	1st ↑
2000–01	Bezirksoberliga	VI	1st ↑
2001–02	Landesliga Hessen-Nord	V	1st ↑
2002–03	Oberliga Hessen	IV	2nd
2003–04	Oberliga Hessen	IV	2nd
2004–05	Oberliga Hessen	IV	13th
2005–06	Oberliga Hessen	IV	1st ↑
2006–07	Regionalliga Süd	III	10th
2007–08	Regionalliga Süd	III	14th
2008–09	Regionalliga Süd	IV	2nd
2009–10	Regionalliga Süd	IV	4th
2010–11	Regionalliga Süd	IV	3rd
2011–12	Regionalliga Süd	IV	11th
2012–13	Regionalliga Südwest	IV	1st
2013–14	Regionalliga Südwest	IV	13th
2014–15	Regionalliga Südwest	IV	10th
2015–16	Regionalliga Südwest	IV	8th
2016–17	Regionalliga Südwest	IV	10th
2017–18	Regionalliga Südwest	IV	16th ↓
2018–19	Hessenliga	V	3rd
2019–20	Hessenliga	V	2nd ↑
2020–21	Regionalliga Südwest	IV	12th
2021–22	Regionalliga Südwest	IV	7th
2022–23	Regionalliga Südwest	IV	13th
2023–24	Regionalliga Südwest	IV	10th
2024–25	Regionalliga Südwest	IV	9th
2025–26	Regionalliga Südwest	IV	6th

- With the introduction of the Regionalligas in 1994 and the 3. Liga in 2008 as the new third tier, below the 2. Bundesliga, all leagues below dropped one tier. Also in 2008, the majority of football leagues in Hesse were renamed, with the Oberliga Hessen becoming the Hessenliga, the Landesliga becoming the Verbandsliga, the Bezirksoberliga becoming the Gruppenliga and the Bezirksliga becoming the Kreisoberliga. In 2012, the number of Regionalligas was increased from three to five with all Regionalliga Süd clubs except the Bavarian ones entering the new Regionalliga Südwest.

↑ Promoted	↓ Relegated
