= 1962 European Athletics Championships – Men's 5000 metres =

Men's 5000 metres at the European Athletics Championships

The men's 5000 metres at the 1962 European Athletics Championships was held in Belgrade, then Yugoslavia, at JNA Stadium on 13 and 15 September 1962.

== Medalists ==
Gold	Bruce Tulloh; Great Britain
Silver	Kazimierz Zimny; Poland
Bronze	Pyotr Bolotnikov; Soviet Union

== Results ==
=== Final ===
15 September

Rank	Name	Nationality	Time	Notes
1st place, gold medalist(s)	Bruce Tulloh	Great Britain	14:00.6	
2nd place, silver medalist(s)	Kazimierz Zimny	Poland	14:01.8	
3rd place, bronze medalist(s)	Pyotr Bolotnikov	Soviet Union	14:02.6	
4	Lech Boguszewicz	Poland	14:03.4	
5	Michel Bernard	France	14:03.8	
6	John Anderson	Great Britain	14:04.2	
7	Siegfried Herrmann	East Germany	14:05.0	
8	Robert Bogey	France	14:06.8	
9	Peter Kubicki	West Germany	14:11.4	
10	Valentin Samoilov	Soviet Union	14:11.8	
11	Yuriy Nikitin	Soviet Union	14:14.6	
12	Miroslav Jurek	Czechoslovakia	14:19.2	

=== Heats ===
13 September

==== Heat 1 ====
Rank	Name	Nationality	Time	Notes
1	Bruce Tulloh	Great Britain	14:14.4	Q
2	Lech Boguszewicz	Poland	14:19.2	Q
3	Siegfried Herrmann	East Germany	14:20.0	Q
4	Yuriy Nikitin	Soviet Union	14:20.2	Q
5	Sven-Olov Larsson	Sweden	14:21.2	
6	Jean Vaillant	France	14:36.8	
7	Béla Szekeres	Hungary	14:38.4	
8	Eugène Allonsius	Belgium	14:44.4	
9	Fevzi Pakel	Turkey	14:47.6	
10	Jean Aniset	Luxembourg	14:48.2	

==== Heat 2 ====
Rank	Name	Nationality	Time	Notes
1	John Anderson	Great Britain	14:15.0	Q
2	Michel Bernard	France	14:15.6	Q
3	Valentin Samoilov	Soviet Union	14:15.8	Q
4	Kazimierz Zimny	Poland	14:15.8	Q
5	Manuel de Oliveira	Portugal	14:16.2	
6	István Kiss	Hungary	14:28.8	
7	Josef Tomáš	Czechoslovakia	14:39.4	
8	Friedrich Janke	East Germany	14:41.4	

==== Heat 3 ====
Rank	Name	Nationality	Time	Notes
1	Peter Kubicki	West Germany	13:53.4	CR Q
2	Pyotr Bolotnikov	Soviet Union	13:53.4	CR Q
3	Robert Bogey	France	13:53.6	Q
4	Miroslav Jurek	Czechoslovakia	13:53.8	Q
5	Eddie Strong	Great Britain	13:56.4	
6	Andrei Barabaș	Romania	14:14.2	
7	Sándor Iharos	Hungary	14:41.0	
8	Johann Hiestand	Switzerland	15:10.2	
	Jim Hogan	Ireland	DNF	

== Participation ==
According to an unofficial count, 27 athletes from 16 countries participated in the event.

- Belgium (1)
- Czechoslovakia (2)
- East Germany (2)
- France (3)
- Hungary (3)
- Ireland (1)
- Luxembourg (1)
- Poland (2)
- Portugal (1)
- Romania (1)
- Soviet Union (3)
- Sweden (1)
- Switzerland (1)
- Turkey (1)
- Great Britain (3)
- West Germany (1)
