= Cyprian Tseriwa =

Zimbabwean Olympic athlete (1937–2023)

Personal information
- Nationality: British subject (1937–1980), Rhodesian citizenship, and Zimbabwean citizenship (1980–2023)
- Born: 16 January 1937 Salisbury, Southern Rhodesia (now Zimbabwe)
- Died: 13 March 2023 (aged 86) Harare, Zimbabwe
- Years active: 1960

Sport
- Events: 5000 m, 10000 m
- Club: Wankie Collery Track Club

Cyprian Tseriwa (16 January 1937 – 13 March 2023) was the first Olympic athlete of African descent for the country of Zimbabwe, running in the 1960 Olympics in Rome in both the 5000m and the 10000m races. He ran under the flag of Southern Rhodesia, a colony of Great Britain.

His 5000 metres time at the Rome Olympics was 15:02 and his 10000 metres time was 30.47.

Tseriwa was from Mashonaland East. After his Olympic Games appearance in 1960, he was hired to be an athletic instructor for the Wankie Collery. There he coached other locally well known Zimbabwean athletes.

There were other Southern Rhodesian Olympians at this time but they were of European descent. Tseriwa was the first black athlete to attend the Games from white-dominated Southern Rhodesia.

Mathias Kanda and Robson Mrombe succeeded Tseriwa as Southern Rhodesian Olympians of black descent when they both ran the marathon in the 1964 Olympics in Tokyo. After 1964, the colony of Southern Rhodesia became the rebel state of Rhodesia. The sport of Athletics was integrated in Rhodesia from 1960, but the politics of Rhodesia was not integrated, and in 1968 the country was banned from the Olympic Games. The country was readmitted in 1980 as Zimbabwe.

Outside of athletics, he worked as a teacher at a Methodist college near Marondera.

Tseriwa died on 13 March 2023, at the age of 86.
