= 1961 USA–USSR Track and Field Dual Meet =

- Dates: July 15–16, 1961
- Host city: Moscow, Soviet Union
- Venue: Lenin Stadium
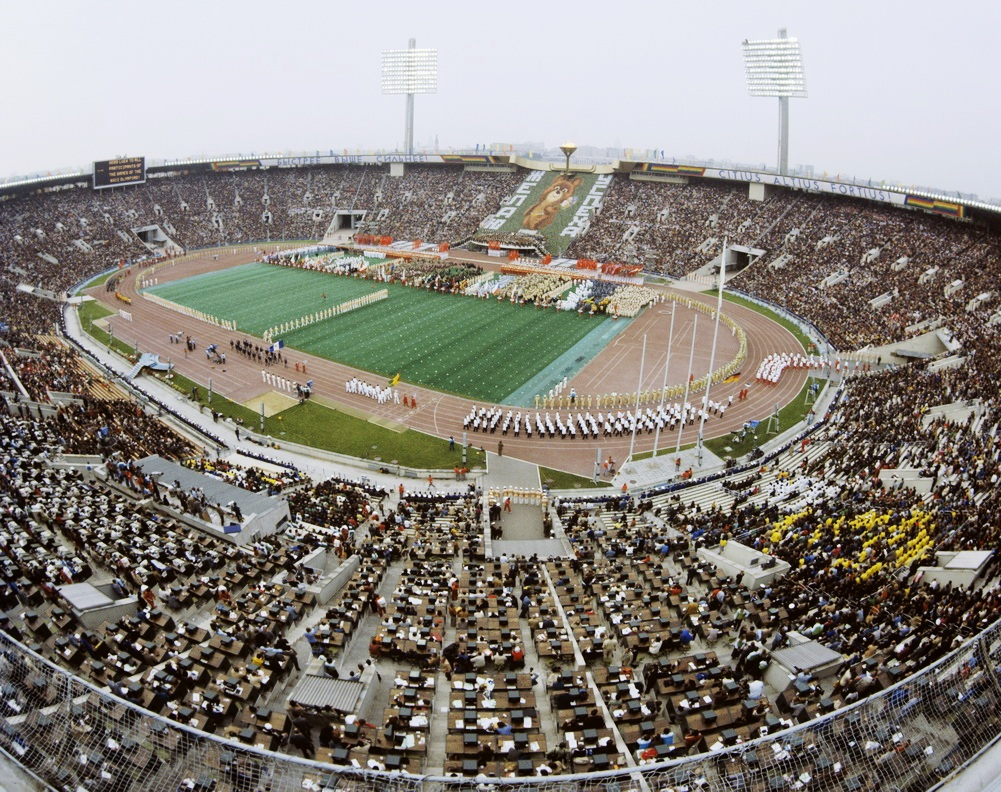
- Level: Senior
- Type: Outdoor
- Events: 32
- Participation: 2 nations

The 1961 USA–USSR Track and Field Dual Meet was an international track and field competition between the Soviet Union and the United States. The third in a series of meetings between the nations, it was held on July 15–16 in Lenin Stadium, Russian SFSR, Soviet Union, and finished with Soviet Union beating the United States 179 to 163. A total of 33 events were contested, 22 by men and 10 by women.

A total of five world records were broken at the competition – the most of any meeting in the series. Home athletes Valeriy Brumel, Tatyana Shchelkanova and Tamara Press set records in field events, while Ralph Boston and the American women's 4 × 100 meters relay team set world standards for the visitors.

== World records ==
Date	Athlete	Nation	Sex	Event	Record
1961-07-15	Hayes Jones; Frank Budd; Charles Frazier; Paul Drayton	United States	Men	4 × 100 m relay	39.1
1961	Valeriy Brumel	Soviet Union	Men	High jump	2.24 m
1961	Ralph Boston	United States	Men	Long jump	8.28 m
1961	Willye White; Ernestine Pollards; Vivian Brown; Wilma Rudolph	United States	Women	4 × 100 m relay	44.3
1961	Tatyana Shchelkanova	Soviet Union	Women	Long jump	6.48 m
1961	Tamara Press	Soviet Union	Women	Discus throw	57.43 m

== Results ==
=== Team score ===
Team	Men	Women	Total
Soviet Union	111	68	179
United States	124	39	163

=== Men ===
Event	Result	Athlete	Nation
100 m	10.3	Frank Budd	United States (USA)
200 m	20.8	Frank Budd	United States (USA)
400 m	46.7	Ulis Williams	United States (USA)
800 m	1:46.8	Jerry Siebert	United States (USA)
1500 m	3:43.8	Jim Beatty	United States (USA)
5000 m	13:58.4	Pyotr Bolotnikov	Soviet Union (URS)
10,000 m	31:40.6	Yury Zakharov	Soviet Union (URS)
4 × 100 m relay	39.1		United States (USA)
4 × 400 m relay	3:08.8		United States (USA)
110 m hurdles	13.8	Hayes Jones	United States (USA)
400 m hurdles	50.5	Clifton Cushman	United States (USA)
3000 m steeplechase	8:35.4	Nikolay Sokolov	Soviet Union (URS)
20 km walk	1:38:11.2	Gennadiy Solodov	Soviet Union (URS)
High jump	2.24 m	Valeriy Brumel	Soviet Union (URS)
Pole vault	4.69 m	John Uelses	United States (USA)
Long jump	8.28 m	Ralph Boston	United States (USA)
Triple jump	16.68 m	Vitold Kreyer	Soviet Union (URS)
Shot put	18.48 m	Gary Gubner	United States (USA)
Discus throw	58.46 m	Jay Silvester	United States (USA)
Hammer throw	66.34 m	Vasily Rudenkov	Soviet Union (URS)
Javelin throw	83.12 m	Viktor Tsybulenko	Soviet Union (URS)
Decathlon	7615 pts	Yuriy Kutenko	Soviet Union (URS)

=== Women ===
Event	Result	Athlete	Nation
100 m	11.3	Wilma Rudolph	United States (USA)
200 m	23.4	Maria Itkina	Soviet Union (URS)
800 m	2:05.4	Lyudmila Lysenko	Soviet Union (URS)
4 × 100 m relay	44.3	Willye White; Ernestine Pollards; Vivian Brown; Wilma Rudolph	United States (USA)
80 m hurdles	10.6	Irina Press	Soviet Union (URS)
High jump	1.70 m	Taisia Chenchik	Soviet Union (URS)
Long jump	6.48 m	Tatyana Shchelkanova	Soviet Union (URS)
Shot put	17.25 m	Tamara Press	Soviet Union (URS)
Discus throw	57.43 m	Tamara Press	Soviet Union (URS)
Javelin throw	54.79 m	Elvīra Ozoliņa	Soviet Union (URS)
