= 1958 European Athletics Championships – Men's 10,000 metres =

Men's 10,000 metres at the European Athletics Championships

The men's 10,000 metres at the 1958 European Athletics Championships was held in Stockholm, Sweden, at Stockholms Olympiastadion on 19 August 1958.

== Medalists ==
Gold	Zdzisław Krzyszkowiak; Poland
Silver	Yevgeniy Zhukov; Soviet Union
Bronze	Nikolay Pudov; Soviet Union

== Results ==
=== Final ===
19 August

Rank	Name	Nationality	Time	Notes
1st place, gold medalist(s)	Zdzisław Krzyszkowiak	Poland	28:56.0	CR, NR
2nd place, silver medalist(s)	Yevgeny Zhukov	Soviet Union	28:58.6	
3rd place, bronze medalist(s)	Nikolay Pudov	Soviet Union	29:02.2	
4	Stanley Eldon	Great Britain	29:02.8	NR
5	Stanisław Ożóg	Poland	29:03.2	PB
6	John Merriman	Great Britain	29:03.8	
7	Alain Mimoun	France	29:30.6	
8	Antonio Amorós	Spain	29:31.4	NR
9	Drago Štritof	Yugoslavia	29:34.8	NR
10	Thyge Thøgersen	Denmark	29:51.8	
11	Tor Torgersen	Norway	29:53.2	
12	Xaver Höger	West Germany	29:55.8	
13	Gerhard Hönicke	East Germany	29:57.8	
14	Øistein Saksvik	Norway	29:59.8	
15	Albert Messitt	Ireland	30:00.0	NR
16	Constantin Grecescu	Romania	30:00.2	
17	Hein Cuje	Netherlands	30:09.0	
18	Maurice Chiclet	France	30:39.0	
19	Marcel Vandewattyne	Belgium	30:45.4	
20	Stig Jönsson	Sweden	31:08.2	
	Boris Jönsson	Sweden	DNF	
	József Kovács	Hungary	DNF	

== Participation ==
According to an unofficial count, 22 athletes from 16 countries participated in the event.

- Belgium (1)
- Denmark (1)
- East Germany (1)
- France (2)
- Hungary (1)
- Ireland (1)
- Netherlands (1)
- Norway (2)
- Poland (2)
- Romania (1)
- Soviet Union (2)
- Spain (1)
- Sweden (2)
- Great Britain (2)
- West Germany (1)
- Yugoslavia (1)
