= Kazimierz Zimny =

Polish long-distance runner (1935–2022)

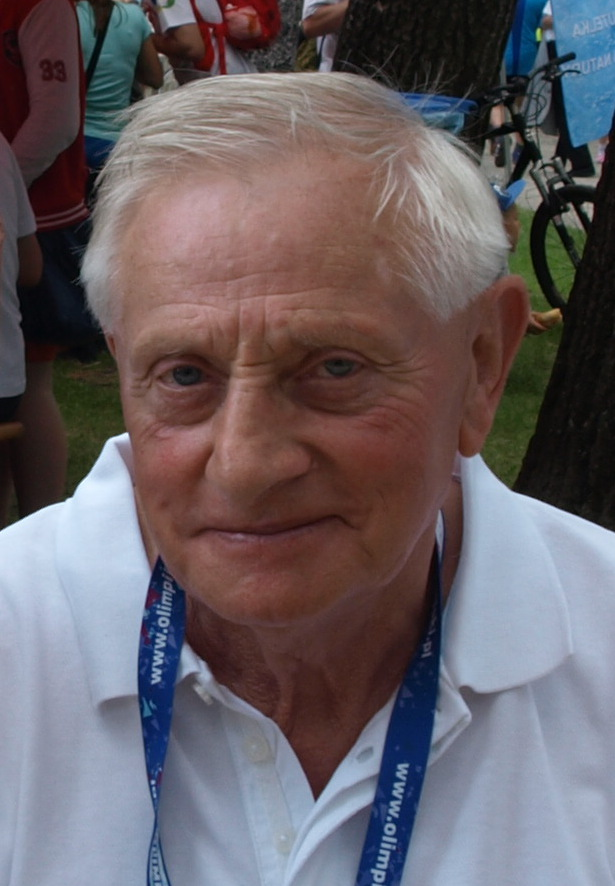
- Kazimierz Zimny, 2013

Personal information
- Born: 4 June 1935 Tczew, Gdańsk Voivodeship, Republic of Poland
- Died: 30 June 2022 (aged 87)
- Height: 1.72 m (5 ft 8 in)
- Weight: 60 kg (132 lb)
Medal record
Men's athletics
Representing Poland
Olympic Games
Bronze medal – third place	1960 Rome	5000 metres
European Championships
Silver medal – second place	1958 Stockholm	5000 metres
Silver medal – second place	1962 Belgrade	5000 metres

Kazimierz Franciszek Zimny (4 June 1935 – 30 June 2022) was a Polish athlete, who competed mainly in the 5000 metres.

He competed for Poland in the 5000 metres at the 1960 Summer Olympics held in Rome, Italy, where he won the bronze medal. He finished just a fraction of a second behind the German runner Hans Grodotzki, who was in fact born only a few miles away (in Pasłęk) from Zimny's hometown in Tczew, in northern Poland. As of 2024, Zimny remains the only Pole, male or female, to have won an Olympic medal in the 5000 meters.

== International competitions ==
Year	Competition	Venue	Position	Event	Notes
Representing Poland
1956	Olympic Games	Melbourne, Australia	–	5000 m	DNF
1958	European Championships	Stockholm, Sweden	2nd	5000 m	13:55.2
1960	Olympic Games	Rome, Italy	3rd	5000 m	13:45.09
1960	Olympic Games	Rome, Italy	–	10,000 m	DNF
1962	European Championships	Belgrade, Yugoslavia	2nd	5000 m	14:01.8
1965	European Cup Final	Stuttgart, West Germany	3rd	10,000 m	28:46.0
1966	European Championships	Budapest, Hungary	18th	10,000 m	29:51.2

== Personal bests ==
- 3000 metres – 7:54.6h (1961)
- 5000 metres – 13:44.4h (1959)
- 10,000 metres – 28:46.0h (1965)
