= Athletics at the 1960 Summer Olympics – Men's 5000 metres =

Men's 5000 metres at the Games of the XVII Olympiad
- Venue: Olympic Stadium
- Dates: August 31, 1960 (heats); September 2, 1960 (final)
- Competitors: 46 from 32 nations
- Winning time: 13:43.7

Medalists
| 1st place, gold medalist(s) | | Murray Halberg; New Zealand |
| 2nd place, silver medalist(s) | | Hans Grodotzki; United Team of Germany |
| 3rd place, bronze medalist(s) | | Kazimierz Zimny; Poland |

The men's 5000 metres long distance event at the 1960 Olympic Games took place between August 31 and September 2.

== Results ==
=== Heats ===
The fastest three runners in each of the four heats advanced to the final round.

Heat one

| Rank | Name | Nationality | Time | Notes |
|---|---|---|---|---|
| 1 | Hans Grodotzki | United Team of Germany | 14:01.29 | |
| 2 | Luigi Conti | Italy | 14:01.55 | |
| 3 | Nyandika Maiyoro | Kenya | 14:06.29 | |
| 4 | Yury Zakharov | Soviet Union | 14:10.41 | |
| 5 | Reijo Höykinpuro | Finland | 14:21.92 | |
| 6 | Hedwig Leenaert | Belgium | 14:25.81 | |
| 7 | Frank Salvat | Great Britain | 14:33.64 | |
| 8 | Gebru Merawi | Ethiopia | 14:41.22 | |
| 9 | Jim Beatty | United States | 14:44.40 | |
| 10 | Michael Hoey | Ireland | 15:00.52 | |
| 11 | Kassim Mukhtar | Iraq | 15:00.97 | |
| | José Aceituno | Chile | DNF | |
| | Béla Szekeres | Hungary | DNF | |

Heat two

| Rank | Name | Nationality | Time | Notes |
|---|---|---|---|---|
| 1 | Horst Flosbach | United Team of Germany | 14:09.25 | |
| 2 | Sándor Iharos | Hungary | 14:09.38 | |
| 3 | Aleksandr Artynyuk | Soviet Union | 14:09.92 | |
| 4 | Allan Lawrence | Australia | 14:10.71 | |
| 5 | Hamoud Ameur | France | 14:14.17 | |
| 6 | Manuel de Oliveira | Portugal | 14:16.14 | |
| 7 | Doug Kyle | Canada | 14:25.36 | |
| 8 | Marian Jochman | Poland | 14:31.29 | |
| 9 | José Molíns | Spain | 14:31.30 | |
| 10 | Mohamed Saïd | Morocco | 14:53.6 | |
| 11 | Ranjit Bhatia | India | 15:06.6 | |
| | O. Eno Alio | Somalia | DNS | |

Heat three

| Rank | Name | Nationality | Time | Notes |
|---|---|---|---|---|
| 1 | Friedrich Janke | United Team of Germany | 14:02.58 | |
| 2 | Michel Bernard | France | 14:04.82 | |
| 3 | Albie Thomas | Australia | 14:06.27 | |
| 4 | Bill Dellinger | United States | 14:08.72 | |
| 5 | Boris Yefimov | Soviet Union | 14:14.68 | |
| 6 | Simo Saloranta | Finland | 14:15.35 | |
| 7 | Jaroslav Bohatý | Czechoslovakia | 14:30.34 | |
| 8 | Gordon Pirie | Great Britain | 14:43.6 | |
| 9 | Khristos Khiotis | Greece | 15:01.2 | |
| 10 | Cyprian Tseriwa | Rhodesia | 15:02.8 | |
| 11 | Somnuek Srisombati | Thailand | 15:32.6 | |

Heat four

| Rank | Name | Nationality | Time | Notes |
|---|---|---|---|---|
| 1 | Dave Power | Australia | 14:03.31 | |
| 2 | Murray Halberg | New Zealand | 14:04.28 | |
| 3 | Kazimierz Zimny | Poland | 14:07.75 | |
| 4 | Bruce Tulloh | Great Britain | 14:17.30 | |
| 5 | Miroslav Jurek | Czechoslovakia | 14:31.53 | |
| 6 | Eugène Allonsius | Belgium | 14:37.20 | |
| 7 | Bob Soth | United States | 14:40.85 | |
| 8 | Miklós Szabó | Hungary | 14:51.99 | |
| 9 | Andrei Barabaș | Romania | 15:11.2 | |
| 10 | Muharrem Dalkılıç | Turkey | 15:13.6 | |
| 11 | Jean Aniset | Luxembourg | 15:17.0 | |
| 12 | Mubarak Shah | Pakistan | 15:43.0 | |
| 13 | George De Peana | Guyana | 15:54.2 | |
| | Zdzisław Krzyszkowiak | Poland | DNS | |

=== Final ===
| Rank | Name | Nationality | Time | Notes |
|---|---|---|---|---|
| 1st place, gold medalist(s) | Murray Halberg | New Zealand | 13:43.76 | |
| 2nd place, silver medalist(s) | Hans Grodotzki | United Team of Germany | 13:45.01 | |
| 3rd place, bronze medalist(s) | Kazimierz Zimny | Poland | 13:45.09 | |
| 4 | Friedrich Janke | United Team of Germany | 13:47.14 | |
| 5 | Dave Power | Australia | 13:52.38 | |
| 6 | Nyandika Maiyoro | Kenya | 13:53.25 | |
| 7 | Michel Bernard | France | 14:04.68 | |
| 8 | Horst Flosbach | United Team of Germany | 14:07.03 | |
| 9 | Aleksandr Artynyuk | Soviet Union | 14:08.45 | |
| 10 | Sándor Iharos | Hungary | 14:11.91 | |
| 11 | Albie Thomas | Australia | 14:20.88 | |
| 12 | Luigi Conti | Italy | 14:34.45 | |

Key: DNF = did not finish
