= 1958 USA–USSR Track and Field Dual Meet =

- Dates: 27–28 July 1958
- Host city: Moscow, Soviet Union
- Level: Senior
- Type: Outdoor

The 1958 USA–USSR Track and Field Dual Meet was an international track and field competition between the Soviet Union and the United States. The first in a series of meetings between the nations, it was held in 27 and 28 July in Moscow, Russian SFSR and finished with Soviet Union beating the United States 172–170. The meet marked an unusual head-to-head for the nations during the Cold War.

== Results ==
=== Teams ===
	Soviet Union	United States
Men	109	126
Women	63	44
Total	172	170

=== Men ===
Discipline	Winner	Result	Country
100 metres	Ira Murchison	10.2	United States
200 metres	Ed Collymore	21.3	United States
400 metres	Glenn Davis	45.6	United States
800 metres	Tom Courtney	1:48.8	United States
1500 metres	Jim Grelle	3:46.7	United States
5000 metres	Hubert Pärnakivi	14:28.4	USSR
10,000 metres	Yevgeny Zhukov	29:59.8	USSR
110 metres hurdles	Ancel Robinson	13.9	United States
400 metres hurdles	Glenn Davis	50.4	United States
3000 metres steeplechase	Semyon Rzhishchin	8:42.0	USSR
4 x 100 metres relay		39.6	United States
4 x 400 metres relay		3:07.8	United States
20 kilometres walk	Leonid Spirin	1:33:43.2	USSR
High jump	Yuri Stepanov	2.12	USSR
Pole vault	Vladimir Bulatov	4.50	USSR
Long jump	Ernie Shelby	7.94	United States
Triple jump	Oleg Ryakhovskiy	16.59 WR	USSR
Shot put	Parry O'Brien	19.14	United States
Discus throw	Rink Babka	57.00	United States
Hammer throw	Hal Connolly	67.48	United States
Javelin throw	Vladimir Kuznetsov	74.67	USSR

=== Women ===
Discipline	Winner	Result	Country
100 metres	Barbara Jones	11.6	United States
200 metres	Lucinda Williams	24.4	United States
800 metres	Yelizaveta Yermolayeva	2:11.8	USSR
80 metres hurdles	Galina Bystrova	11.8	USSR
4 x 100 metres relay		44.8	United States
High jump	Taisia Chenchik	1.65	USSR
Long jump	Aida Chuyko	5.95	USSR
Shot put	Earlene Brown	16.54	United States
Discus throw	Nina Ponomaryeva	51.84	USSR
Javelin throw	Birutė Zalogaitytė	50.16	USSR
