= USA–USSR Track and Field Dual Meet Series =

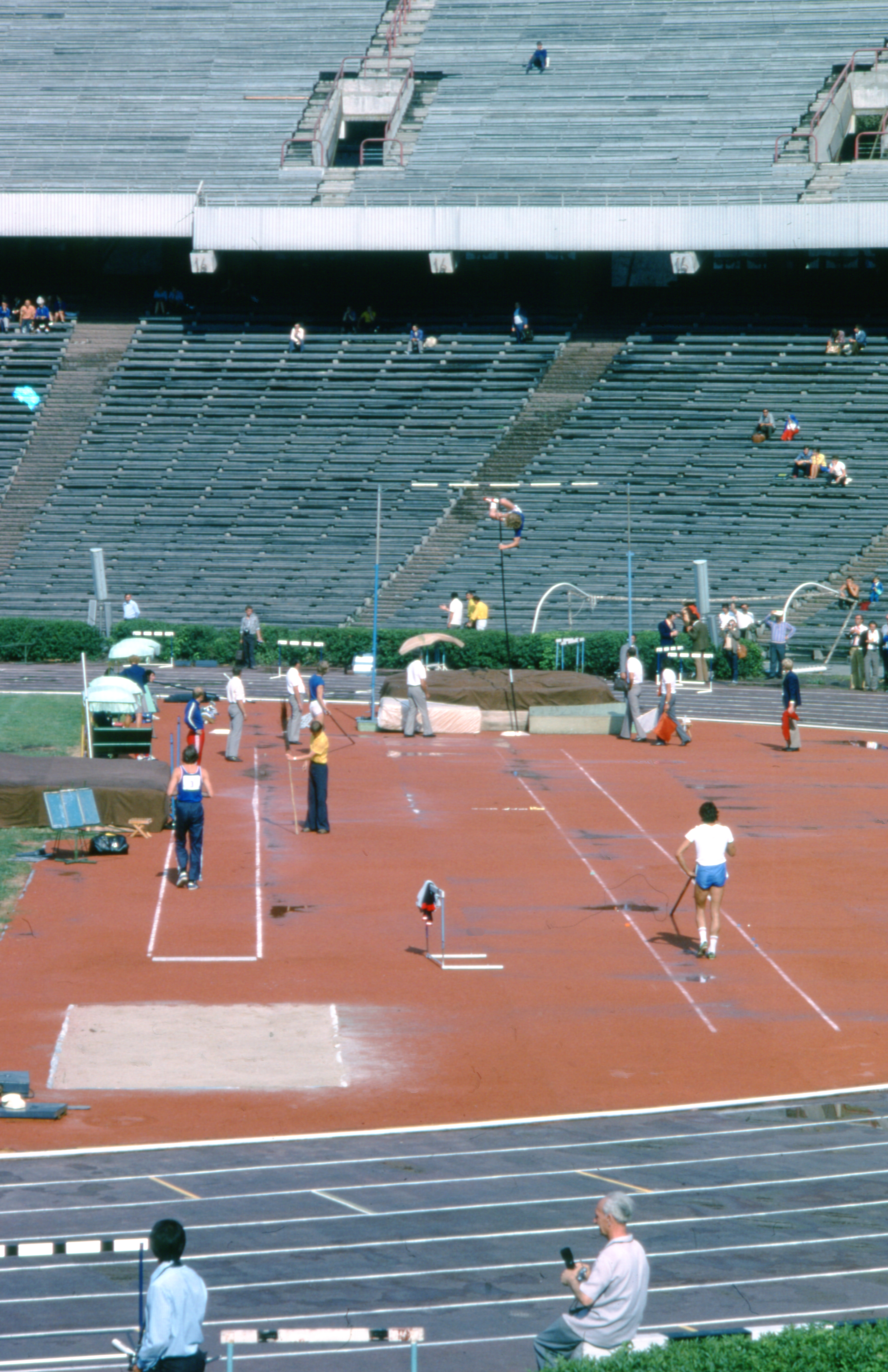
Action from the 1975 USA–USSR meet

USA–USSR Dual Track Meet Series was a track and field meeting between United States and Soviet Union. It was held 19 times during the Cold War era from 1958 to 1985. The meeting was arranged alternatively in both countries, exception being the last event in 1985 which was held in Tokyo, Japan. Seven indoor meetings were also competed in the 1970s. Although the meetings were foremost athletic competitions, they served as propaganda and foreign diplomacy tools as well.

The most classic meeting is considered the 1962 competition in Stanford, California, with an attendance of more than 150,000 on a two-day event, the largest ever on a non-Olympic track and field competition. Even the Soviet workouts attracted crowds of 5,000. Two world records were set in Stanford, Valeriy Brumel on high jump and Hal Connolly on hammer throw. Though the Stanford meeting was held just two months before the Cuban Missile Crisis, the athletes exhibited mutual friendship, with both Russian and American athletes congratulating Brumel on his feat and both nations' athletes completing a lap of honour at the end of competition.

The meet was held annually from 1958 to 1965 save for 1960. An eighth edition of the meet was originally scheduled to take place at Los Angeles Memorial Coliseum on 23-24 July 1966, but the Soviets pulled out before the competition. Following that, it did not resume until 1969.

The 1971 edition was also called the U.S.-Russia-World All-Stars Meet.

== Editions ==
Year	Date	Location	Venue	Winner	Total	Men	Women
1958	27–28 July	Moscow	Lenin Stadium	Soviet Union	172 – 170	(United States) 126 – 109	(Soviet Union) 63 – 44
1959	18–19 July	Philadelphia	Franklin Field	Soviet Union	175 – 167	(United States) 127 – 108	(Soviet Union) 67 – 40
1961	15–16 July	Moscow	Lenin Stadium	Soviet Union	179 – 160	(United States) 124 – 111	(Soviet Union) 68 – 36
1962	21–22 July	Stanford	Stanford Stadium	Soviet Union	173 – 169	(United States) 128 – 107	(Soviet Union) 66 – 41
1963	20–21 July	Moscow	Lenin Stadium	Soviet Union	189 – 147	(United States) 119 – 114	(Soviet Union) 75 – 28
1964	25–26 July	Los Angeles	Los Angeles Coliseum	United States	187 – 156	(United States) 139 – 97	(Soviet Union) 59 – 48
1965	31 July–1 August	Kiev	Central Stadium	Soviet Union	181.5 – 155.5	(Soviet Union) 118 – 112	(Soviet Union) 63.5 – 43.5
1969	18–19 July	Los Angeles	Los Angeles Coliseum	United States	195 – 178	(United States) 125 – 111	(United States) 70 – 67
1970	23–24 July	Leningrad	Lenin Stadium	Soviet Union	200 – 173	(Soviet Union) 122 – 114	(Soviet Union) 78 – 59
1971	2–3 July	Berkeley	Edwards Stadium	Soviet Union; United States	186 – 186	(United States) 126 – 110	(Soviet Union) 76 – 60
1973	23–24 July	Minsk	Republic Stadium	Soviet Union	216 – 163	(Soviet Union) 121 – 112	(Soviet Union) 95 – 51
1974	5–6 July	Durham	Wallace Wade Stadium	Soviet Union	192 – 184	(United States) 117 – 102	(Soviet Union) 90 – 67
1975	4–5 July	Kiev	Central Stadium	Soviet Union	225 – 138	(Soviet Union) 129 – 89	(Soviet Union) 96 – 49
1976	6–7 August	College Park	Byrd Stadium	Soviet Union	211 – 157	(United States) 115 – 107	(Soviet Union) 104 – 42
1977	1–2 July	Sochi	Central Stadium	Soviet Union	207 – 171	(Soviet Union) 118 – 105	(Soviet Union) 89 – 66
1978	7–8 July	Berkeley	Edwards Stadium	United States	190 – 177	(United States) 119 – 102	(Soviet Union) 75 – 71
1981	11–12 July	Leningrad	Lenin Stadium	Soviet Union	204 – 178	(United States) 118 – 105	(Soviet Union) 99 – 60
1982	2–3 July	Indianapolis	Indiana University	Soviet Union	207 – 167	(Soviet Union) 118 – 100	(Soviet Union) 89 – 67
1985	21–22 September	Tokyo	National Olympic Stadium	Soviet Union	221 – 164	(United States) 114 – 104	(Soviet Union) 117 – 50

=== Indoor meetings ===
Year	Date	Location	Venue	Winner	Total	Men	Women
1972	17 March	Richmond	Richmond Coliseum	United States	131 – 112	(United States) 79 – 69	(United States) 54 – 43
1973	16 March	Richmond	Richmond Coliseum	Soviet Union	146 – 141	(Soviet Union) 84 – 76	(United States) 65 – 62
1974	2 March	Moscow	Brothers Znamensky Olympic Centre	Soviet Union	163 – 126	(Soviet Union) 89 – 72	(Soviet Union) 74 – 65
1975	3 March	Richmond	Richmond Coliseum	United States	171 – 106	(Soviet Union) 98 – 62	(United States) 73 – 44
1976	6 March	Leningrad	Zimniy Stadion	Soviet Union	171 – 117	(Soviet Union) 96 – 64	(Soviet Union) 75 – 53
1977	3–4 March	Toronto	Maple Leaf Gardens	United States	159 – 120	(United States) 90 – 69	(United States) 69 – 51
1979	3 March	Fort Worth	Tarrant County Convention Center	United States	121 – 118	(United States) 75 – 66	(Soviet Union) 52 – 46

== World records ==
Year	Athlete	Nation	Sex	Event	Record
1958	Oleg Ryakhovskiy	Soviet Union	Men	Triple jump	16.59 m
1958	Rafer Johnson	United States	Men	Decathlon	8302 pts
1961	Valeriy Brumel	Soviet Union	Men	High jump	2.24 m
1961	Ralph Boston	United States	Men	Long jump	8.28 m
1961	Willye White; Ernestine Pollards; Vivian Brown; Wilma Rudolph	United States	Women	4 × 100 m relay	44.3
1961	Tatyana Shchelkanova	Soviet Union	Women	Long jump	6.48 m
1961	Tamara Press	Soviet Union	Women	Discus throw	57.43 m
1962	Valeriy Brumel	Soviet Union	Men	High jump	2.26 m
1962	Hal Connolly	United States	Men	Hammer throw	70.67 m
1963	Valeriy Brumel	Soviet Union	Men	High jump	2.28 m
1964	Fred Hansen	United States	Men	Pole vault	5.28 m
1964	Dallas Long	United States	Men	Shot put	20.67 m
1965	Wyomia Tyus	United States	Women	100 m	11.1
1974	Lyudmila Bragina	Soviet Union	Women	3000 m	8:52.74
1976	Lyudmila Bragina	Soviet Union	Women	3000 m	8:27.12

== Multiple winners ==
Athlete	Nation	Wins	Years	Event	Sex
Volodymyr Holubnychy	Soviet Union	6	1959, 1962, 1964, 1969–1970, 1976	20 km race walk	Men
Viktor Saneyev	Soviet Union	6	1969, 1971, 1973-1976	Triple jump	Men
Taisia Chenchik	Soviet Union	6	1958–1959, 1962–1963, 1965	High jump	Women
Tamara Press	Soviet Union	6	1959, 1961-1965	Shot put and discus throw	Women
Nadezhda Chizhova	Soviet Union	6	1969–1971, 1973–1974, 1976	Shot put	Women
Faina Melnik	Soviet Union	6	1971, 1973–1974, 1976-1978	Discus throw	Women
Lyudmila Bragina	Soviet Union	5	1969–1970, 1973, 1974, 1976	1500 m and 3000 m	Women
Valeriy Brumel	Soviet Union	5	1961-1965	High jump	Men
Jānis Lūsis	Soviet Union	5	1962–1965, 1969	Javelin throw	Men
Ralph Boston	United States	4	1961–1963, 1965	Long jump	Men
Tatyana Shchelkanova	Soviet Union	4	1961–1963, 1965	Long jump	Women
Irina Press	Soviet Union	4	1961–1963, 1965	80 m hurdles	Women
Elvīra Ozoliņa	Soviet Union	4	1961–1963, 1973	Javelin throw	Women
