= Rudolf Harbig Memorial Award =

The Rudolf Harbig Memorial Award (German: Rudolf-Harbig-Gedächtnispreis) is an annual sports award in recognition of German competitors in the sport of athletics who, in performance and attitude, have been role models for young people. The award was created in 1950, named after German middle-distance runner Rudolf Harbig, who died age 30 fighting for the Wehrmacht in World War II. The award was suggested by the Clubs der Alten Meister (Old Masters Club), a union of former athletes and made official by Karl Ritter von Halt, the former leader of the National Socialist League of the Reich for Physical Exercise. Given by the German Athletics Association (DLV), the award was for West German athletes only prior to German reunification.

The prize may only be awarded once to an athlete, who is selected by an internal German Athletics Association panel. The DLV president gives the award at the German Athletics Championships each year, a tradition started at the championships in 1950. The award was historically mostly been given to men (37 male to 13 female winners in its first 50 years) – prior to 2005, a female winner had succeeded another woman on one occasion only. Men and women have received the honour in roughly equal frequency since 1999.

== Winners ==
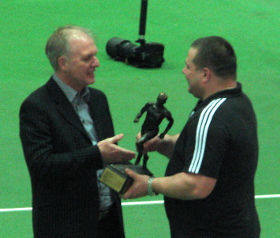
Clemens Prokop gives Ralf Bartels the 2013 award

Year	Winner	Sex	Event
1950	Alfred Dompert	Male	Steeplechase
1951	Karl Wolf	Male	Hammer
1952	Hermann Eberlein	Male	Long-distance
1953	Heinz Ulzheimer	Male	Middle-distance
1954	Karl Storch	Male	Hammer
1955	Herbert Schade	Male	Long-distance
1956	Maria Sander	Female	Hurdles
1957	Karl-Friedrich Haas	Male	Sprints
1958	Heinz Fütterer	Male	Sprints
1959	Marianne Werner	Female	Shot put
1960	Manfred Germar	Male	Sprints
1961	Paul Schmidt	Male	Middle-distance
1962	Karl Hein	Male	Hammer
1963	Helmut Janz	Male	Hurdles
1964	Erika Fisch	Female	Long jump
1965	Manfred Kinder	Male	Sprints
1966	Helga Hoffmann	Female	Long jump
1967	Klaus Lehnertz	Male	High jump
1968	Hinrich John	Male	Hurdles
1969	Ingrid Becker	Female	Pentathlon
1970	Harald Norpoth	Male	Long-distance
1971	Hermann Salomon	Male	Javelin
1972	Horst Beyer	Male	Decathlon
1973	Heide Rosendahl	Female	Pentathlon
1974	Bernd Kannenberg	Male	Racewalking
1975	Michael Sauer	Male	Triple jump
1976	Rita Wilden	Female	Sprints
1977	Annegret Richter	Female	Sprints
1978	Klaus Wolfermann	Male	Javelin
1979	Gerhard Weidner	Male	Racewalking
1980	Franz-Peter Hofmeister	Male	Sprints
1981	Guido Kratschmer	Male	Decathlon
1982	Karl-Hans Riehm	Male	Hammer
1983	Ulrike Meyfarth	Female	High jump
1984	Willi Wülbeck	Male	Middle-distance
1985	Thomas Wessinghage	Male	Middle-distance
1986	Brigitte Kraus	Female	Middle-distance
1987	Harald Schmid	Male	Hurdles
1988	Dietmar Mögenburg	Male	High jump
1989	Rolf Danneberg	Male	Discus
1990	Claudia Losch	Female	Shot put
1991	Hans Grodotzki	Male	Long-distance
1992	Heike Henkel	Female	High jump
1993	Hartwig Gauder	Male	Racewalking
1994	Thomas Schönlebe	Male	Sprints
1995	Christian Schenk	Male	Decathlon
1996	Dieter Baumann	Male	Long-distance
1997	Steffen Brand	Male	Steeplechase
1998	Florian Schwarthoff	Male	Hurdles
1999	Heike Drechsler	Female	Long jump
2000	Heinz Weis	Male	Hammer
2001	Jürgen Schult	Male	Discus
2002	Sabine Braun	Female	Heptathlon
2003	Lars Riedel	Male	Discus
2004	Frank Busemann	Male	Decathlon
2005	Astrid Kumbernuss	Female	Shot
2006	Franka Dietzsch	Female	Discus
2007	Charles Friedek	Male	Triple jump
2008	Steffi Nerius	Female	Javelin
2009	Nadine Kleinert	Female	Shot put
2010	Ingo Schultz	Male	Sprints
2011	Tim Lobinger	Male	Pole vault
2012	Ralf Bartels	Male	Shot put
2013	Björn Otto	Male	Pole vault
2014	Betty Heidler	Female	Hammer
2015	Christian Reif	Male	Long jump
2016	Verena Sailer	Female	Sprints
2017	Christina Obergföll	Female	Javelin
2018	Linda Stahl	Female	Javelin
2019	Robert Harting	Male	Discus
2022	Christina Schwanitz	Female	Shot put
2023	Cindy Roleder	Female	Hurdles
