= Hans-Ulrich Thomale =

German football manager (born 1944)

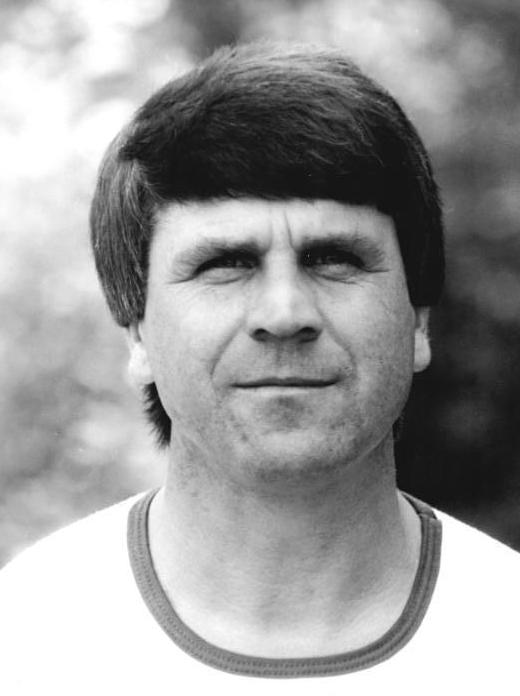
- Thomale in 1987

Personal information
- Date of birth: 6 December 1944 (age 81)
- Place of birth: Sörnewitz, Germany
- Position: Defender

Senior career*
Years	Team	Apps	(Gls)
- BSG Motor Sörnewitz
- BSG Aufbau Meißen
- FSV Lokomotive Dresden
- Stahl Riesa

Managerial career
- 1981–1985: Wismut Aue
- 1985–1990: Lokomotive Leipzig
- 1990–1992: Hessen Kassel
- 1992: FC Homburg
- 1993–1996: Grazer AK
- 1996–1997: KFC Uerdingen
- 1998: Chengdu Wuniu
- 1998–1999: VfB Leipzig
- 1999–2000: VFC Plauen
- 2000–2001: Rot-Weiß Erfurt
- 2004: Hessen Kassel
- * Club domestic league appearances and goals

Hans-Ulrich Thomale (born 6 December 1944) is a German football manager and former player.

== Career ==
Thomale played as a defensive midfielder and defender for 1. FC Lokomotive Leipzig and BSG Stahl Riesa in the DDR-Oberliga.

Thomale has been the manager and sporting director for former club 1. FC Lokomotive Leipzig. He also managed Chinese Jia-B League club Chengdu Wuniu in 1998.
