= Ludwig Müller (runner) =

German long-distance runner (1932–2022)

Personal information
- Nationality: German
- Born: 25 January 1932 Wesel, Germany
- Died: 26 January 2022 (aged 90) Kassel, Germany
- Height: 1.73 m (5 ft 8 in)

Sport
- Sport: Middle-distance running
- Event: Steeplechase
- Club: Weseler TV –1959; FSV Frankfurt 1960–1961; KSV Hessen Kassel 1962–

Ludwig Müller (25 January 1932 – 26 January 2022) was a German long-distance runner.

Following a double victory in the 5000 and 10,000 metres at a West Germany–USSR athletic meet in Augsburg, Müller earned the nickname "the hero from Augsburg". He finished twelfth in the 5000 metres at the 1958 European Championships, sixth in the 3000 metres steeplechase at the 1960 Summer Olympics, and competed at the 1962 European Championships without reaching the final.

At the West German championships, Müller won the 5000 metres in 1958 as well as won two additional medals. He also became national cross-country champion (long race) in 1959 and 1960, and won a solitary bronze medal in the 10,000 metres. He lastly became steeplechase champion in 1963, winning two additional steeplechase medals. He represented the sports clubs Weseler TV until 1959, FSV Frankfurt until 1961, and KSV Hessen Kassel from 1962. Indoors, he became national 3000 metres champion in 1959 and won three additional medals. His personal best steeplechase time was 8:44.0 minutes, achieved in 1960.

Müller died in Kassel on 26 January 2022, at the age of 90.
