= John Cheffers =

Personal information
- Full name: John Theodore Francis Cheffers
- Born: 13 May 1936
- Died: 28 October 2012 (aged 76)
- Original team: Kew Amateurs
- Debut: 1955, Carlton vs. North Melbourne, at Princes Park
- Height: 180 cm (5 ft 11 in)
- Weight: 72 kg (159 lb)

Playing career^{1}
Years	Club	Games (Goals)
1955	Carlton	4 (4)
- ^{1} Playing statistics correct to the end of 1955.

Dr. John Theodore Francis Cheffers (13 May 1936 in Melbourne, Australia – 28 October 2012) was the second Director of the Australian Institute of Sport. He succeeded Don Talbot as AIS Director in 1984 and stayed in the role until 1986. Ronald Harvey took over the directorship of the institute after his departure. Cheffers was a professor of Education and Coordinator of the Human Movement Program at Boston University and contributed a number of journal articles on sport and physical education.

As a young man John Cheffers was a strong Field athlete. He placed sixth in the 1956 Victorian State Triple Jump championship with a jump of 13.05m (42 feet 10 inches). In the 1957 Victorian State Long Jump championship he placed third with a jump of 6.885m (22 feet 7 inches). His favorite event was the Pole Vault.

Cheffers first came to note as an athletics coach. His most successful athlete was Jean Roberts who won several Commonwealth Games silver and bronze in the Discus and Shot Put during the 1960s and 1970s as well as 13 national athletic championships in the Discus and Shot Put. Pam Telfer also won a national championship in the javelin under John's coaching. Anna Karner, who won several Australian shot put and discus titles in the 1970s, was also coached by John Cheffers. Karen Moller, who took 4th twice in the US Olympic Trials in the High Jump, was also coached by John during the first half of the 1970s.

John also played four senior games with Carlton in the Victorian Football League in 1955, as well as being a fitness advisor to Hawthorn in the mid-1960s. John also played for the Box Hill football club, in the VFA, from 1958 to 1962.

In 1968 Cheffers became the head athletic coach for Zimbabwe, then called Rhodesia. His experiences coaching the multiracial team that was selected are detailed in his book A Wilderness of Spite: Rhodesia Denied. This team was denied entry to Mexico for the Olympics by the Mexican government, and was, de facto, banned from the Olympic Games at this point. Cheffers has a strong belief, as a result of this time, that politics should not interfere in sport. Mathias Kanda, Bernard Dzoma and Robson Mrombe are well known distance runners who John coached during 1968.

In 1969 Cheffers was appointed head athletic coach for Papua New Guinea and led them to the third South Pacific Games in Port Moresby, New Guinea.

Receiving his Masters of Education in 1970, and his Doctorate of Education in 1973, both from Temple University in Philadelphia, Cheffers moved north to Boston where he worked for Boston University. In 1972 Cheffers founded the Boston University School of Education's Tuesday-Thursday Physical Education Program.

Cheffers' work on violence in sports was featured in Sports Illustrated.

Following his tenure at the Australian Institute of Sport, Cheffers returned to academia and was President of AIESEP (Association Internationale des Ecoles Superieures d'Education Physique) from 1984 to 1998.

Cheffers died on 28 October 2012 while on a plane en route from San Francisco to Sydney. He is survived by his wife, Margaret, his four children, Paul, Mark, Leigh and Andrew, and 17 grandchildren.

John's father, Percy Cheffers, also played football in the VFL in the 1930s.

== Publications ==
- A Wilderness of Spite: Rhodesia Denied, Vantage Press, 1972: The experiences of the author as coach of the ill-fated 1968 Rhodesian Olympic team.
- The Story of US footy by John Cheffers and Greg Narleski. The Lexington Press, 2003: The story of the nasceant Australian Rules football league in the United States of America
- Unique Games and Sports around the World: A Reference Guide by Doris Corbett, John Cheffers and Eileen Crowley Sullivan. Greenwood Press, 2001: A list of the many games around the world.
- Raw and resilient : an account of Australian sport seen through the eyes of the National Institute of Sports Executive Director by John Cheffers. Wm C. Brown, 1992
- Only The Educated Are Free: by John Cheffers, Ken Hawkins, and Rich Nastasi. Allen David Press. 2011. Reflections on teaching after 50 years in the field.
- Shallow were the Giants is a book by John Cheffers detailing the 1980 Olympic boycott and related political movements in sports. It is a historical commentary on the decision of many countries not to participate in the Moscow Olympics.
