= Boris Yefimov (athlete) =

Personal information
- Nationality: Soviet
- Born: 4 April 1935 (age 91)

Sport
- Sport: Long-distance running
- Event: 5000 metres

Boris Yefimov (born 4 April 1935) is a Soviet long-distance runner. He competed in the men's 5000 metres at the 1960 Summer Olympics.
