= Michael Hoey (athlete) =

Irish long-distance runner

Personal information
- Nationality: Irish
- Born: 5 February 1939 (age 87)

Sport
- Sport: Long-distance running
- Event: 5000 metres

Michael Hoey (born 5 February 1939) is an Irish long-distance runner. He competed in the men's 5000 metres at the 1960 Summer Olympics.
