= 1962 USA–USSR Track and Field Dual Meet =

- Dates: July 21–22, 1962
- Host city: Stanford, United States
- Venue: Stanford Stadium
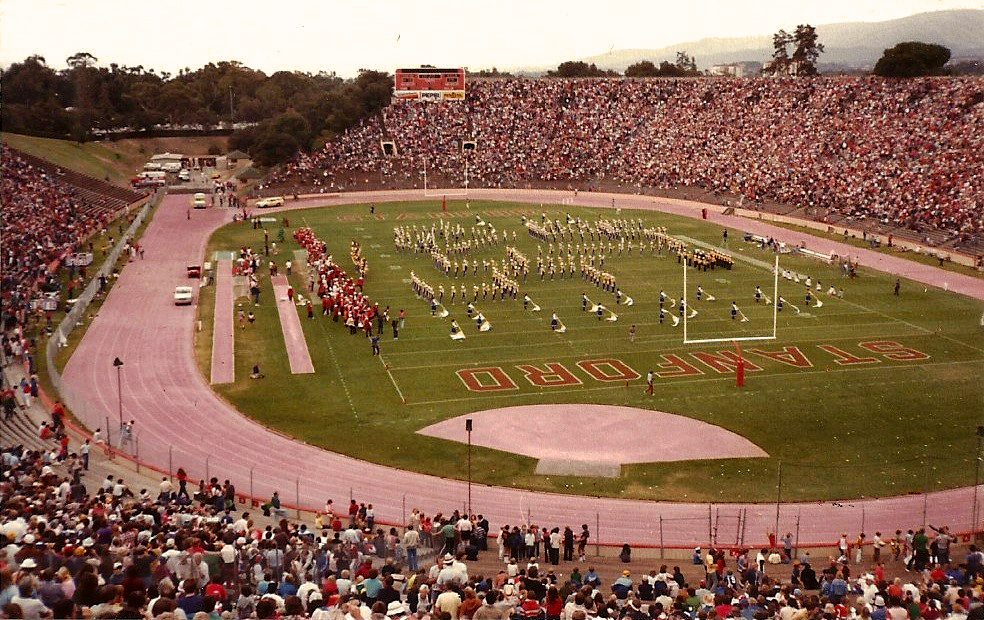
- Level: Senior
- Type: Outdoor
- Events: 32
- Participation: 2 nations

The 1962 USA–USSR Track and Field Dual Meet was an international track and field competition between the Soviet Union and the United States. The fourth in a series of meetings between the nations, it was held on July 21–22 at the Stanford Stadium in Stanford, California, United States, and finished with the Soviet Union closely defeating the United States 173 to 169. A total of 32 events were contested, 22 by men and 10 by women. The meet marked a high point in public interest in the competition, with an attendance of more than 150,000 over the two-day event – the largest ever on a non-Olympic track and field competition. Even the Soviet workouts attracted crowds of 5000.

Two world records were broken at the competition: Russian athlete Valeriy Brumel set a record of 2.26 m (7 ft 4 3/4 in) in the men's high jump and Hal Connolly broke the men's hammer throw record with a mark of 70.67 m (231 ft 10 1/4 in).

== World records ==
Year	Athlete	Nation	Sex	Event	Record
1962	Valeriy Brumel	Soviet Union	Men	High jump	2.26 m
1962	Hal Connolly	United States	Men	Hammer throw	70.67 m

== Results ==
=== Team score ===
Team	Men	Women	Total
Soviet Union	107	66	173
United States	128	41	169

=== Men ===
Event	Result	Athlete	Nation
100 m	10.2	Bob Hayes	United States (USA)
200 m	20.8	Paul Drayton	United States (USA)
400 m	46.4	Ulis Williams	United States (USA)
800 m	1:46.4	Jerry Siebert	United States (USA)
1500 m	3:39.9	Jim Beatty	United States (USA)
5000 m	13:55.6	Pyotr Bolotnikov	Soviet Union (URS)
10,000 m	29:17.7	Pyotr Bolotnikov	Soviet Union (URS)
4 × 100 m relay	39.6		United States (USA)
4 × 400 m relay	3:03.8		United States (USA)
110 m hurdles	13.4	Jerry Tarr	United States (USA)
400 m hurdles	50.3	Willie Atterberry	United States (USA)
3000 m s'chase	8:42.3	Nikolay Sokolov	Soviet Union (URS)
20 km walk	1:37:51.3	Volodymyr Holubnychy	Soviet Union (URS)
High jump	2.26 m	Valeriy Brumel	Soviet Union (URS)
Pole vault	4.90 m	Ron Morris	United States (USA)
Long jump	8.15 m	Ralph Boston	United States (USA)
Triple jump	16.60 m	Vladimir Goryaev	Soviet Union (URS)
Shot put	19.53 m	Dallas Long	United States (USA)
Discus throw	60.93 m	Al Oerter	United States (USA)
Hammer throw	70.67 m	Hal Connolly	United States (USA)
Javelin throw	82.09 m	Jānis Lūsis	Soviet Union (URS)
Decathlon	7830 pts	Vasili Kuznetsov	Soviet Union (URS)

=== Women ===
Event	Result	Athlete	Nation
100 m	11.5	Wilma Rudolph	United States (USA)
200 m	23.7	Vivian Brown	United States (USA)
800 m	2:08.6	Lyudmila Lysenko	Soviet Union (URS)
4 × 100 m relay	44.6		United States (USA)
80 m hurdles	10.7	Irina Press	Soviet Union (URS)
High jump	1.70 m	Taisia Chenchik	Soviet Union (URS)
Long jump	6.39 m	Tatyana Shchelkanova	Soviet Union (URS)
Shot put	17.38 m	Tamara Press	Soviet Union (URS)
Discus throw	57.74 m	Tamara Press	Soviet Union (URS)
Javelin throw	55.59 m	Elvīra Ozoliņa	Soviet Union (URS)
