= Hamida Addèche =

French long-distance runner

Personal information
- Nationality: French
- Born: 14 June 1932 (age 94) Douéra, French Algeria

Sport
- Sport: Long-distance running
- Event: 10,000 metres

Hamida Addèche (born 14 June 1932) is a French long-distance runner. He competed in the men's 10,000 metres at the 1960 Summer Olympics.
