= Robson Mrombe =

Rhodesian athlete (1945–2025)

Robson Mrombe (Rabson Mulombe)
Personal information
- Nationality: Rhodesian
- Born: 12 September 1945 Wankie, Southern Rhodesia
- Died: 13 May 2025 (aged 79)
- Years active: 1964–1972

Sport
- Event: Marathon
- Club: Wankie Athletic Club

Robson Mrombe (12 September 1945 – 13 May 2025), also known as Rabson Mulombe, was a Rhodesian athlete who competed in the 1964 Summer Olympic men's marathon.

== Biography ==
Born on 12 September 1945, Mrombe originally came from Wankie in Rhodesia (Zimbabwe today). He began running at the Kanchindu Mission School in Zambia in the 1950s. He usually ran for the Wankie Athletic Club which was a fierce competitor in Rhodesian track and field in the 1960s with the Alpha Track Club from Bulawayo.

Mrombe also ran 2:18:53.7 at Bulawayo in the 1964 Rhodesian Olympic marathon trials. He competed in the 1964 Summer Olympic men's marathon finishing 56th and running 2 hours 49 minutes and 30 seconds in the marathon. Mulombe said that he had a cramp in the Olympic Marathon and otherwise would have placed better.

Robson trained to run in the Mexican 1968 Olympic Games, running approximately 2:32 in the Rhodesian Olympic Trials in Bulawayo in late June 1968, finishing second that day to Mathias Kanda. Robson was recommended for inclusion in the Olympic team that year by John Cheffers, the coach of the 1968 Rhodesian/Zimbabwe track team; however, Robson was not selected to run.

A treatise on the history of Rhodesian participation in the Olympics mentions Robson.

Robson won the 1971 South African marathon championship at Libanon Mine Track, 20 kilometres outside of Johannesburg, at 5,300 feet altitude in 2:32:13.

A retrospective on Robson's running career appeared in the Zimbabwe Herald in 2011. Speaking of his 1964 Olympic experience he said in 2011: "I was quite excited to participate in the Games. However, there was a lot of segregation, we were not treated well. Most of the times we were hidden in the Games village and were not allowed to go out yet our white teammates were allowed to roam around."

Robson began running at the Kanchindu Mission School in Zambia in the 1950s. He had a winning streak starting in 1970. Says the Herald 2011 article: "He won the South Africa Chamber of Mines races [marathon] in 1966 and the Orange Free State race in the same year. He won the Orange Free State race for the second time in 1970. He went on a winning streak and it was only in 1974 that he came second behind Zisco Steel's runner, John Shaba."

Honoured by the Wankie community in his older age, he was named "the honorary member of the Kujatana Nkubotu peace half-marathon that is held annually in Binga."

When asked for advice to younger people, Robson said: "I encourage the young athletes to take sport seriously because even in my old age I don't feel that old because of the training that I took. My body is still strong, it is something that brought gladness in my life. It is about being passionate."

Mrombe died after a long illness on 13 May 2025, at the age of 79.

== External references ==
- Video on YouTube – late in this video are several seconds of Robson Mrombe (number 58), wearing green, finishing the 1964 Olympic marathon exhausted.
- Sports Reference site for Robson Mrombe
