= Bernard Dzoma =

Personal information
- Nationality: Rhodesian
- Born: 9 October 1941 Umtali, Southern Rhodesia
- Died: 11 April 2019 (aged 77) Umtali Zimbabwe
- Years active: 1964-1976

Sport
- Event(s): 10000m, 5000m

Bernard Dzoma was a Rhodesian/Zimbabwean Athlete, born October 1941, died 11 April 2019. He gained qualification at Harare(Salisbury) Technical college as a Carpenter and Joiner. He worked for Rothmans tobacco company, then Rio Tinto Group|(Cam and Motor mine). He was the first Rhodesian to break 30 minutes in the 10,000 metre race. Running in the 1960s and 1970s, Dzoma was selected to compete for Rhodesia (today Zimbabwe) in that country's 1968 and 1972 Olympic teams . This team was refused entry permits to Mexico for political reasons, and Rhodesia was banned from the Olympic Games until 1980. Dzoma's running at this time, along with fellow Zimbabwean athlete, Mathias Kanda, are detailed by his Australian coach's book: A Wilderness of Spite by John Cheffers.

Andrew Novak has a treatise on Rhodesian participation in the Olympic which also mentions Dzoma.

After the personal disappointment of not being able to run in the 1968 Olympic Games, Dzoma continued to train on his own and was selected to run in the 1972 Munich Games. He was in Munich for the Games, however, again, the Rhodesian team was not allowed to compete.

Dzoma then became a coach and coached three Zimbabwean marathoners at the 1985 Hiroshima World Marathon Championships.

After this Dzoma married and had six children. He worked as a Joiner and later as a Rio Tinto employee. Bernard died on 11 April 2019 after a long illness.

A comprehensive listing of Dzoma's track times and more biographical information is available online.
