= Percy Cheffers =

Australian rules footballer

Personal information
- Full name: Percy Theodore Cheffers
- Born: 1 June 1913
- Died: 18 October 1965 (aged 52); Fitzroy, Victoria
- Original team: Melbourne's reserves
- Height: 178 cm (5 ft 10 in)
- Weight: 73 kg (161 lb)

Playing career^{1}
| Years | Club | Games (Goals) |
| 1936–38 | St Kilda | 8 (0) |
- ^{1} Playing statistics correct to the end of 1938.

Percy Cheffers (1 June 1913 – 18 October 1965) was an Australian rules footballer who played with St Kilda in the Victorian Football League (VFL). Before joining St Kilda, Cheffers played with Melbourne's reserves side, winning a VFL seconds premiership in 1935.

During World War II, Cheffers started as a private in the Royal Australian Electrical and Mechanical Engineers (RAEME) in 1940 for the Australian Sixth Division, in the 2/2nd Field Workshops, RAEME. He rose to the rank of warrant officer class I in charge of around 18 people who repaired radios for the Australian Ninth Division. He saw action in Libya, Palestine, New Guinea and Borneo.

Percy married Mary Ellen Braines in the 1930s and had four children with her. He married his second wife, Audrey, in the 1950s. He died in a house fire in Fitzroy in 1965.

Percy received a Diploma in Electrical Engineering from Swinburne Technical College in 1955

His son, John Cheffers, became a noted sports academic.
