= Franco Antonelli =

Italian long-distance runner (1934–2022)

Personal information
- Full name: Francesco Antonelli
- Nationality: Italian
- Born: 28 March 1934 Collazzone, Kingdom of Italy
- Died: 31 January 2022 (aged 87) Turin, Italy

Sport
- Country: Italy
- Sport: Athletics
- Event: Long-distance running
- Club: FIAT Torino

Franco Antonelli (28 March 1934 – 31 January 2022) was an Italian male long-distance runner who competed at the 1960 Summer Olympics.

Antonelli died in Torino, Italy on 31 January 2022, at the age of 87.

== National titles ==
Antonelli won a national championships at senior level.

- Italian Athletics Championships
  - 10,000 metres: 1961
