= Christos Chiotis =

Greek athlete

Personal information
- Nationality: Greek
- Born: 12 July 1932 (age 93)

Sport
- Sport: Long-distance running
- Event: 5000 metres

Christos Chiotis (Greek: Χρίστος Χιώτης; born 12 July 1932), also transliterated as Khristos Khiotis, is a Greek long-distance runner. He competed in the men's 5000 metres at the 1960 Summer Olympics. He was named the 1958 Greek Athlete of the Year.
