= Aleksey Desyatchikov =

Soviet long-distance runner

Personal information
- Nationality: Soviet
- Born: 31 October 1932 Moscow, Soviet Union
- Died: 4 June 2018 (aged 85)

Sport
- Sport: Long-distance running
- Event: 10,000 metres

Aleksey Desyatchikov (Алексéй Степáнович Деся́тчиков, 31 October 1932 – 4 June 2018) was a Soviet long-distance runner. He competed in the men's 10,000 metres at the 1960 Summer Olympics, finishing in fourth place.
