= Zdzisław Krzyszkowiak =

Polish distance runner (1929–2003)

- Krzyszkowiak in 1960

Personal information
- Born: 3 August 1929 Wielichowo, Poland
- Died: 24 March 2003 (aged 73) Warsaw, Poland
Medal record
Men's athletics
Representing Poland
Olympic Games
Gold medal – first place	1960 Rome	3000 m st.
European Championships
Gold medal – first place	1958 Stockholm	5000 m
Gold medal – first place	1958 Stockholm	10,000 m

Zdzisław Ludwik Krzyszkowiak (Polish pronunciation: [ˈzd͡ʑiswaf ˈkʂɨʂkɔvjak]; 3 August 1929 – 24 March 2003) was a Polish track and field athlete, winner of the 3000 metre steeplechase at the 1960 Summer Olympics.

Born in Wielichowo, Greater Poland Voivodeship, Krzyszkowiak won 13 Polish National Championship titles in long-distance and cross-country events.

Krzyszkowiak rose to the international athletics scene at the 1956 Summer Olympics, where he missed the bronze medal in the 10,000 metres by 7.4 seconds, finishing fourth. At the 1958 European Championships in Athletics, Krzyszkowiak established himself as one of the best European long-distance runners by winning both the 5000 and 10,000 metres. In 1958, he became the first winner of the European Sportsperson of the Year conferred by the Polish Press Agency.

Just two months before the Rome Olympics, Krzyszkowiak ran his first world record, clocking 8:31.4 in the 3000 m steeplechase. At the Olympics itself, Krzyszkowiak finished seventh in the 10,000 m, but won, as a main favourite, the 3000 m steeplechase.

After the Olympics, Krzyszkowiak decided to concentrate on the 3000 m steeplechase event, running his second world record in 1961, but was forced to retire from sports prematurely in 1963 due to injuries. After his running career, he worked as a coach.

Zdzisław Krzyszkowiak died in Warsaw, aged 73.

Zdzisław Krzyszkowiak Stadium in Bydgoszcz was named in his honor.

== International competitions ==
Representing Poland
Year	Competition	Venue	Position	Event	Notes
1953	World Festival of Youth and Students	Bucharest, Romania	5th	3000 m s'chase	9:04.6
1955	World Festival of Youth and Students	Warsaw, Poland	5th	5000 m	14:05.3
1956	Olympic Games	Melbourne, Australia	4th	10,000 m	29:05.41
1956	Olympic Games	Melbourne, Australia	5th (h)	3000 m s'chase	8:48.29^{1}
1958	European Championships	Stockholm, Sweden	1st	5000 m	13:53.4
1958	European Championships	Stockholm, Sweden	1st	10,000 m	28:56.0
1960	Olympic Games	Rome, Italy	7th	10,000 m	28:52.75
1960	Olympic Games	Rome, Italy	1st	3000 m s'chase	8:34.30
1962	European Championships	Belgrade, Yugoslavia	13th (h)	3000 m s'chase	8:49.8

^{1}Did not start in the final

== Personal bests ==
- 3000 metres – 7:58.2h
- 5000 metres – 13:51.6h
- 10,000 metres – 28:52.4h (1960)
- 3000 metres steeplechase– 8:30.4h (1961)

Records
Preceded by (Poland) Jerzy Chromik	Men's Steeplechase World Record Holder; June 26, 1960 – May 28, 1961	Succeeded by (Soviet Union) Grigoriy Taran
Preceded by (Soviet Union) Grigoriy Taran	Men's Steeplechase World Record Holder; June 26, 1961 – September 7, 1963	Succeeded by (Belgium) Gaston Roelants
