= Hans Grodotzki =

East German long-distance runner (1936–2026)

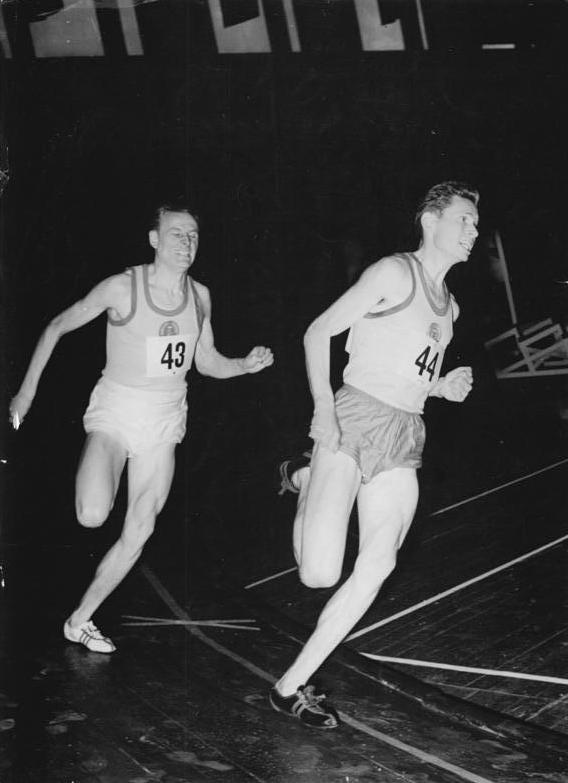
- Grodotzki (left) with Werner Krause, 1962

Medal record

Men's athletics

Representing Germany

Olympic Games
Silver medal – second place	1960 Rome	10,000 metres
Silver medal – second place	1960 Rome	5000 metres

Hans Grodotzki (4 April 1936 – 18 September 2026) was an East German long-distance runner who competed mainly in track events.

Grodotzki competed for the United Team of Germany in the 1960 Summer Olympics held in Rome, Italy in the 10,000 metres where he won the silver medal. In the 5,000 metres he repeated this, winning a second silver medal.

== Biography ==
Hans Grodotzki was born in Preußisch Holland, East Prussia, now Poland, on 4 April 1936. The Second World War ended in May 1945 and Grodotzki, who accompanied his parents and two siblings, was obliged by frontier changes to relocate. The family ended up living in Menteroda, Thuringia, in the southern part of the Soviet occupation zone in Germany. After leaving school Grodotzki worked as a miner in the Volkenroda Potash mines, also playing, in his free time, football and table tennis. He began athletics training in 1954 after being "talent spotted".

While he was 20 he was called up for his military service in the Kasernierte Volkspolizei, subsequently in 1956 he was transferred to the Army Sports Association centre at Potsdam. A period of intensive training under Erich Bock ensued. Already in 1956 he set a new East German 5,000 meter junior record (14:18,0). He was moved to Berlin in 1958, where he was trained by Curt Eins, and within half a year he was a member of the East Germany national team.

His success as a dual long distance medalist at the 1960 Olympic Games was honored by the East German government when he received the Patriotic Order of Merit and in united Germany in 1991, he was awarded the Rudolf Harbig Memorial Award. As of 2024, Grodotzki remains the only German to have won an Olympic medal in the 10,000 meters.

Grodotzki died in Potsdam on 18 September 2026, at the age of 90.
