= Yevgeny Zhukov (athlete) =

Soviet long-distance runner

Personal information
- Nationality: Soviet
- Born: 20 August 1930 Tula, Russian SFSR, Soviet Union

Sport
- Sport: Long-distance running
- Event: 10,000 metres
Medal record
Men's athletics
Representing Soviet Union
European Championships
Silver medal – second place	1958 Stockholm	10,000 m

Yevgeny Zhukov (born 20 August 1930) is a Soviet long-distance runner. He competed in the men's 10,000 metres at the 1960 Summer Olympics.
