= Jaroslav Bohatý =

Czech long-distance runner

Personal information
- Nationality: Czech
- Born: 17 January 1935 (age 91) Vlčnov, Czechoslovakia

Sport
- Sport: Long-distance running
- Event: 5000 metres
Medal record
Representing Czechoslovakia
Summer Universiade
Bronze medal – third place	1959 Turin	5000m

Jaroslav Bohatý (born 17 January 1935) is a Czech long-distance runner. He competed in the men's 5000 metres at the 1960 Summer Olympics.
