= Fevzi Pakel =

Turkish long-distance runner

Personal information
- Nationality: Turkish
- Born: 1936 (age 89–90)

Sport
- Sport: Long-distance running
- Event: 10,000 metres

Fevzi Pakel (born 1936) is a Turkish long-distance runner. He competed in the men's 10,000 metres at the 1960 Summer Olympics.
