= Bruce Tulloh =

British athlete

- Tulloh in 1966

Personal information
- Nationality: British (English)
- Born: 29 September 1935 Datchet, England
- Died: 28 April 2018 (aged 82) Marlborough, England
- Height: 171 cm (5 ft 7 in)
- Weight: 54 kg (119 lb)

Sport
- Sport: Athletics
- Event: middle distance
- Club: Portsmouth AC

Achievements and titles
- Personal bests: Mile: 3:59.3; 5000 m: 13:49.4; 10,000 m: 28:50.4
Medal record
Men's athletics
Representing Great Britain
European Championships
Gold medal – first place	1962 Belgrade	5000 metres

Michael Swinton "Bruce" Tulloh (29 September 1935 – 28 April 2018) was a long-distance runner from England who competed at the 1960 Summer Olympics.

== Athletics career ==
Tulloh became the British 3 miles champion after winning the British AAA Championships titles at the 1959 AAA Championships and at the 1962 AAA Championships.

Tulloh won the European title in the men's 5000 metres at the 1962 European Championships in Belgrade, Yugoslavia with a winning time of 14:00.6. He was also part of a national title winning team Portsmouth A.C. in cross-country and road running in the 1960s. He was famous for running barefoot in many of his races. His twin daughters were teenage running phenomena in the 1980s setting age-best marks running for their club Swindon A.C. They also ran barefoot.

He represented England in the 1 mile and 3 mile races at the 1962 British Empire and Commonwealth Games in Perth, Western Australia. Four years later he competed in the 3 mile and 6 mile races at the 1966 British Empire and Commonwealth Games. In between he won his third AAA 3 miles title at the 1963 AAA Championships.

In 1969, Tulloh ran 2876 miles across America from Los Angeles to New York City in 64 days. This is described in his book Four Million Footsteps, published by Pelham Books and as a Mayflower paperback in 1970.

He was coach to British marathon athlete Richard Nerurkar.

Personal bests
Distance	Time (min)	Date	Location
Mile	3:59.3	27 January 1962	Hamilton, New Zealand
3 miles	13:12.0	17 August 1961	Southampton, U.K.
5000 m	13:49.4	22 July 1964	Helsinki, Finland
6 miles	27:23.78	8 July 1966	London, U.K.
10,000 m	28:50.4	30 August 1966	Budapest, Hungary

== Personal life ==
He taught biology at The Bulmershe School, Dr Challoner's Grammar School and then Marlborough College for 20 years.

He wrote a book, Running is Easy, that is essentially an amateur's guide to becoming a good runner.

Tulloh also wrote for Runner's World. One of his most important contributions was a three-fold training programme for the ten-mile race (16.1 km): the first programme was how to get sub-80 mins (4:58 per km), the second was for sub-70 mins (4:21 per km) and the third for sub-60 mins (3:44 per km).

== Death ==
Tullloh died at his home in Marlborough on 28 April 2018. He was 82.

== Publications ==
Title	Year	Publisher	ISBN	Pages
Long-distance running	1967	Amateur Athletic Association		31
Tulloh on running	1968	Heinemann		
Four million footsteps	1970	Mayflower	0583116930	175
Naturally fit	1976	Barker	0213165872	167
The Olympic Games	1976	Heinemann	0435270273	72
The complete jogger	1979	Macmillan	0333257189	138
The marathon book	1982	Virgin	0907080332	190
The complete distance runner	1983	Panther	0586059768	224
Bruce Tulloh's running log: the complete runner's companion	1986	Stephens	0850598443	160
The teenage runner	1989	Kingswood	043498177X	156
Running your first marathon and half marathon	1989	Thorsons	0722517955	64
Track athletics	1994	Blandford	071372403X	79
Running is easy	1996	CollinsWillow	0002187310	192

== See also ==
- Barefoot running
