= Xaver Höger =

German long-distance runner (1930–2014)

Personal information
- Nationality: German
- Born: 7 April 1930
- Died: 7 April 2014 (aged 84)

Sport
- Sport: Long-distance running
- Event: 10,000 metres

Xaver Höger (7 April 1930 – 7 April 2014) was a German long-distance runner. He competed in the men's 10,000 metres at the 1960 Summer Olympics.
