= Yury Zakharov (athlete) =

Soviet long-distance runner

Personal information
- Nationality: Soviet
- Born: 2 August 1933 Novosibirsk, Soviet Union

Sport
- Sport: Long-distance running
- Event: 5000 metres

Yury Zakharov (born 2 August 1933) is a Soviet long-distance runner. He competed in the men's 5000 metres at the 1960 Summer Olympics.
