= Horst Flosbach =

German long-distance runner (born 1936)

Personal information
- Full name: Horst Franz Flosbach
- Nationality: German
- Born: 18 June 1936 (age 90)

Sport
- Sport: Long-distance running
- Event: 5000 metres

Horst Franz Flosbach (born 18 June 1936) is a German long-distance runner. He competed in the men's 5000 metres at the 1960 Summer Olympics.
