= Peter Clark (athlete) =

British athlete

Personal information
- Nationality: British (English)
- Born: 29 November 1933
- Died: 11 June 2014 (aged 80) Manchester, England

Sport
- Sport: Athletics
- Event: middle distance
- Club: Thames Valley Harriers

Peter Ronald Clark (29 November 1933 – 11 June 2014) was an English athlete.

== Biography ==
Clark finished third behind Stan Eldon in the 3 miles event at the 1958 AAA Championships.

Clark was selected for the England athletics team in the 3 miles at the 1958 British Empire and Commonwealth Games in Cardiff, Wales.

Clark died on 11 June 2014, at the age of 80.
