= Mathias Kanda =

Rhodesian field athlete

Mirimi Mathias Kanda
Personal information
- Born: 2 June 1940 Enkeldoorn, Southern Rhodesia (today Chivhu, Zimbabwe)
- Died: 30 October 2009 (aged 67) Bulawayo, Zimbabwe
- Years active: 1964–1976

Sport
- Event: Marathon
- Club: Alpha Track Club
Medal record
Representing Rhodesia
South African Marathon Championships
Gold medal – first place	1964	Marathon
Gold medal – first place	1968	Marathon
Gold medal – first place	1969	Marathon

Mirimi Mathias Kanda (2 June 1940– 30 October 2009) was a track and field athlete who competed for Rhodesia (today Zimbabwe) in the 1964 Summer Olympic men's marathon, finishing 51st and running 2:41.09 in the marathon. He was then selected to run in the 1968 Olympic team along with his countryman Bernard Dzoma, but this team was not allowed to compete in the Olympic Games for political reasons. Kanda running experiences during this time are detailed by his Australian coach, John Cheffers, in his book: A Wilderness of Spite.

== Winning moments ==
Cheffers felt that Kanda was a medal hope in the Mexican Olympic marathon. In the last weekend in June 1968, Kanda won the Zimbabwe/Rhodesian Olympic Marathon trial in Bulawayo (at 4500 feet altitude) in 2:27:04.7 on a cold windy course that had an 8 kilometre raise at the end of the course. On 4 May 1968 Kanda also won a South African marathon championship (at the Libanon Mine Track 20 kilometres from Johannesburg) at 5337 feet in a 2:27:24.8. Considering that both races were at significant altitude (with the Libanon Mine Track closer to the 7382 feet of Mexico City) Kanda was well conditioned for running at Mexico City. His Bulawayo time would have taken 6th in the Mexico Olympic marathon. He won Republic of South Africa marathon championships in 1964, 1968 and 1969 and, as of 2013, tied with several others as a runner who has won the most marathon championships in South African running history.

The altitude table below shows that Mathias was well conditioned to run at the 7300 feet of Mexico City.

Location	Elevation in feet	Effective O2%	Oxygen Difference	Marathon Time	Marathon Date
Sea level	0 ft	21%	0%		
Bulawayo	4500 ft	17.5%	67%	2:27:04	late June 1968
Libanon Mine Track (SA)	5337 ft	17.1%	75%	2:27:24	4 May 1968
Mexico City	7300 ft	15.8%	100%	DNR	20 Oct 1968

This table shows that the Bulwayo and Libanon runs were at 2/3 and 3/4 of the effective oxygen deficit that existed at Mexico City.

== Summary of running career ==
A 2001 article by the Bulawayo Chronicle summarizes Kanda's running career and has an account of his running career in his own words. Concerning his young life: "We traveled long distances to school and as herd-boys. Endurance became more like an in-born thing and club coaches, later in my life, came in with handy hints. But in all I worked hard for my glory. It did not come easy and I was blessed in that I did not drink or smoke which gave me ample time to concentrate in the sport." Kanda's training in the early 1960s involved waking up at 3:00am, going for a training run, then jogging to work (at the Bulawayo City Council), and then going for a training run after work.

== Photo of the Month ==
He was the subject of a photograph taken by David Paynter in 1968 which became the Associated Press June 1968 "Photo of the Month". In the photograph, Kanda is seen running against a train. This photograph has been referenced several times by other photographers and sign designers since 1968. The 26 July 1968 Life Magazine published this picture on page 30.

== Death ==
Kanda died on 30 October 2009 after a long illness. He is survived by his wife, Florence, and six children.
