= Aleksandr Artynyuk =

Ukrainian long-distance runner

Personal information
- Nationality: Ukrainian
- Born: 9 September 1935 Darivka, Ukrainian SSR, USSR
- Died: 16 February 2019 (aged 83)

Sport
- Sport: Long-distance running
- Event: 5000 metres

Aleksandr Artynyuk (8 September 1935 – 16 February 2019) was a Ukrainian long-distance runner. He competed in the men's 5000 metres at the 1960 Summer Olympics.
