= Ernestine Pollards =

American sprinter

Personal information
- Born: January 19, 1942 Chicago, Illinois, United States
- Died: January 22, 2014 (aged 72) Altamonte Springs, Florida, U.S.

Sport
- Sport: Sprinting
- Event: 200 metres

Ernestine Pollards (January 19, 1942 – January 22, 2014) was an American sprinter. She competed in the women's 200 metres at the 1960 Summer Olympics.
