= Miroslav Jurek =

Czech long-distance runner (born 1935)

Personal information
- Nationality: Czech
- Born: 28 October 1935 Boskovice, Czechoslovakia
- Died: September 2018 (aged 82)

Sport
- Sport: Long-distance running
- Event: 5000 metres

Miroslav Jurek (28 October 1935 – September 2018) was a Czech long-distance runner. He competed in the men's 5000 metres at the 1960 Summer Olympics.
