= Athletics at the 1960 Summer Olympics – Men's decathlon =

Men's decathlon at the Games of the XVII Olympiad
- Venue: Stadio Olimpico
- Dates: 5–6 September 1960
- Competitors: 30 from 20 nations
- Winning points: 8392 OR

Medalists
1st place, gold medalist(s)		Rafer Johnson; United States
2nd place, silver medalist(s)		Yang Chuan-kwang; Formosa
3rd place, bronze medalist(s)		Vasili Kuznetsov; Soviet Union

The men's decathlon at the 1960 Summer Olympics took place between 5 September and 6 September at the Stadio Olimpico.

== Summary ==
Despite the presence of previous world record holder Vasili Kuznetsov, the competition quickly became a battle between UCLA training partners Rafer Johnson and Yang Chuan-kwang, also known as C.K. Yang. After two years of training together under "Ducky" Drake, each knew the other's abilities.

Yang's abilities lay in the speed events, building an almost 90 point lead in the first two events (100m and long jump). Johnson was superior in the throwing events. At the end of the first day, Johnson had a 55-point advantage.

The second day began with Yang speeding to a 180-point advantage in the 110 hurdles. Johnson countered with a 270-point gain in the Discus. Yang continued to dominate in the pole vault but Johnson set a personal record in the event, minimizing Yang's gain. Yang followed that by staying close to Johnson in the javelin, leaving the final event, Yang's best event, the 1500m to decide the competition. Both knew Yang would need to defeat Johnson by 10 seconds to win. Johnson did not break, finishing a mere 1.2 seconds behind Yang to claim the gold medal. Yang beat Johnson in seven of the ten events, but Johnson beat Yang by significant margins in the shot put and discus to win. The two warmly congratulated each other after the conclusion of the event and waved to the crowd.

== Records ==
Prior to this competition, the existing world and Olympic records were as follows:

World record	(United States) Rafer Johnson	8683 points	Eugene, United States	09 July 1960
Olympic record	Milt Campbell (USA)	7937 points	Melbourne, Australia	30 November 1956

== Results ==
=== 100m ===
Rank	Athlete	Country	Time	Points	Notes
1	Yang Chuan-kwang	Formosa	10.7	1034	
2	Klaus Grogorenz	United Team of Germany	10.8	990	
3	Rafer Johnson	United States	10.9	948	
4	Vasili Kuznetsov	Soviet Union	11.1	870	
4	Seppo Suutari	Finland	11.1	870	
4	Héctor Thomas	Venezuela	11.1	870	
7	Mirko Kolnik	Yugoslavia	11.2	834	
8	Rodolfo Mijares	Mexico	11.3	800	
8	Fritz Vogelsang	Switzerland	11.3	800	
8	Walter Meier	United Team of Germany	11.3	800	
8	Evert Kamerbeek	Netherlands	11.3	800	
8	Herman Timme	Netherlands	11.3	800	
13	Dave Edstrom	United States	11.4	768	
13	Yuriy Kutenko	Soviet Union	11.4	768	
13	Manfred Bock	United Team of Germany	11.4	768	
13	Franco Sar	Italy	11.4	768	
17	Markus Kahma	Finland	11.5	737	
17	Léopold Marien	Belgium	11.5	737	
17	Hans Muchitsch	Austria	11.5	737	
17	Alois Buchel	Liechtenstein	11.5	737	
17	Philip Mulkey	United States	11.5	737	
22	Gurbachan Singh Randhawa	India	11.6	707	
22	Yuri Diachkov	Soviet Union	11.6	707	
22	Juris Laipenieks	Chile	11.6	707	
22	Joze Brodnik	Yugoslavia	11.6	707	
26	Panayotis Epitropoulos	Greece	11.7	638	
27	Holm Bjoergvin	Iceland	11.8	650	
27	Luciano Paccagnella	Italy	11.8	650	
29	Júlio Santos	Portugal	12.0	597	
29	George Stulac	Canada	12.0	597	

=== Long jump ===
Rank	Athlete	Country	1	2	3	Mark	Points
1	Yang Chuan-kwang	Formosa	7.46	7.13	7.37	7.46	950
2	Rafer Johnson	United States	7.21	6.92	7.35	7.35	906
3	Evert Kamerbeek	Netherlands	7.21	x		7.21	856
4	Hans Muchitsch	Austria	6.95	7.14	x	7.14	932
5	Yuri Diachkov	Soviet Union	7.12	7.09	6.70	7.12	825
6	Vasili Kuznetsov	Soviet Union	6.95	6.86	6.96	6.96	773
7	Fritz Vogelsang	Switzerland	6.94	6.65	6.74	6.94	767
8	Seppo Suutari	Finland	6.58	6.94	x	6.94	767
9	Klaus Grogorenz	United Team of Germany	6.60	6.93	6.84	6.93	764
10	Yuriy Kutenko	Soviet Union	6.71	6.93	6.64	6.93	764
11	Markus Kahma	Finland	6.71	6.93	x	6.93	764
12	Mirko Kolnik	Yugoslavia	6.47	6.93	x	6.93	764
12	Holm Bjoergvin	Iceland	x	6.47	6.93	6.93	764
14	Herman Timme	Netherlands	6.93	x		6.93	764
15	Joze Brodnik	Yugoslavia	6.37	6.78	6.91	6.91	758
16	Juris Laipenieks	Chile	6.77	5.78	6.88	6.88	749
17	Philip Mulkey	United States	6.57	6.51	6.43	6.57	746
18	Gurbachan Singh Randhawa	India	6.87	x	x	6.87	746
19	Héctor Thomas	Venezuela	6.15	6.55	6.81	6.81	728
20	Manfred Bock	United Team of Germany	6.79	x	7.37	6.79	722
21	Luciano Paccagnella	Italy	6.50	6.73	x	6.73	704
22	Franco Sar	Italy	6.63	6.69	6.67	6.69	692
23	Léopold Marien	Belgium	6.09	6.62	x	6.62	672
24	Alois Buchel	Liechtenstein	6.05	6.51	6.54	6.54	651
25	Dave Edstrom	United States	x	6.16	6.39	6.39	610
26	Júlio Santos	Portugal	6.21	6.14	6.32	6.32	592
27	Panayotis Epitropoulos	Greece	6.03	6.23	6.22	6.23	570
28	Rodolfo Mijares	Mexico	x	x	6.20	6.20	562
29	George Stulac	Canada	5.92	x	5.65	5.92	493
30	Walter Meier	United Team of Germany	x	x	x	NM	0

=== Shot put ===
Rank	Athlete	Country	1	2	3	Mark	Points
1	Rafer Johnson	United States	14.55	15.82	15.26	15.82	976
2	Seppo Suutari	Finland	14.29	x	14.96	14.96	872
3	Markus Kahma	Finland	14.55	x	-	14.55	827
4	Vasili Kuznetsov	Soviet Union	14.41	14.46	x	14.46	817
5	Luciano Paccagnella	Italy	14.18	x	13.11	14.18	788
6	Philip Mulkey	United States	14.10	13.77	13.82	14.10	780
7	Yuriy Kutenko	Soviet Union	12.51	13.97	13.83	13.97	767
8	Franco Sar	Italy	13.49	13.89	13.80	13.89	759
9	Evert Kamerbeek	Netherlands	13.76	13.57	13.71	13.76	746
10	Walter Meier	United Team of Germany	13.68	13.25	13.34	13.68	738
11	Dave Edstrom	United States	13.59	13.54	13.10	13.59	729
12	Holm Bjoergvin	Iceland	x	13.58	13.36	13.58	728
13	Héctor Thomas	Venezuela	12.93	13.42	13.24	13.42	712
14	Yang Chuan-kwang	Formosa	12.42	13.33	x	13.33	703
15	Yuri Diachkov	Soviet Union	12.55	13.22	13.21	13.22	692
16	Herman Timme	Netherlands	13.19	12.84	11.20	13.19	689
17	Mirko Kolnik	Yugoslavia	12.68	13.10	x	13.10	681
18	George Stulac	Canada	13.32	12.21	12.74	13.32	648
19	Juris Laipenieks	Chile	12.24	11.86	12.65	12.65	640
20	Klaus Grogorenz	United Team of Germany	x	11.75	12.42	12.42	619
21	Joze Brodnik	Yugoslavia	x	12.30	8.27	12.30	609
22	Panayotis Epitropoulos	Greece	12.06	11.74	11.79	12.06	587
23	Manfred Bock	United Team of Germany	10.83	12.03	11.45	12.03	584
24	Fritz Vogelsang	Switzerland	11.11	11.49	11.78	11.78	562
25	Léopold Marien	Belgium	10.68	11.38	11.44	11.44	535
26	Gurbachan Singh Randhawa	India	11.35	11.24	10.57	11.35	528
27	Hans Muchitsch	Austria	10.26	10.77	11.77	11.77	505
28	Júlio Santos	Portugal	10.65	10.85	10.67	10.85	488
29	Rodolfo Mijares	Mexico	x	9.74	10.59	10.59	467
30	Alois Buchel	Liechtenstein	9.20	9.49	9.71	9.71	406

=== High jump ===
Rank	Athlete	Country	Mark	Points
1	Gurbachan Singh Randhawa	India	1.90	900
1	Yang Chuan-kwang	Formosa	1.90	900
3	Rafer Johnson	United States	1.85	832
3	Manfred Bock	United Team of Germany	1.85	832
3	Yuri Diachkov	Soviet Union	1.85	832
3	Herman Timme	Netherlands	1.83	806
6	Seppo Suutari	Finland	1.83	806
6	Walter Meier	United Team of Germany	1.83	806
6	Philip Mulkey	United States	1.83	806
10	Hans Muchitsch	Austria	1.80	770
10	Luciano Paccagnella	Italy	1.80	770
10	Franco Sar	Italy	1.80	770
10	Yuriy Kutenko	Soviet Union	1.80	770
10	Evert Kamerbeek	Netherlands	1.80	770
10	Joze Brodnik	Yugoslavia	1.80	770
16	Markus Kahma	Finland	1.75	711
16	Vasili Kuznetsov	Soviet Union	1.75	711
16	Héctor Thomas	Venezuela	1.75	711
16	Holm Bjoergvin	Iceland	1.75	711
16	Léopold Marien	Belgium	1.75	711
21	Klaus Grogorenz	United Team of Germany	1.73	689
21	Panayotis Epitropoulos	Greece	1.73	689
21	Alois Buchel	Liechtenstein	1.73	689
24	Fritz Vogelsang	Switzerland	1.70	656
24	Mirko Kolnik	Yugoslavia	1.70	656
24	George Stulac	Canada	1.70	656
27	Juris Laipenieks	Chile	1.65	605
27	Rodolfo Mijares	Mexico	1.65	605
27	Júlio Santos	Portugal	1.65	605
-	Dave Edstrom	United States	-	-

=== 400m ===
Rank	Athlete	Country	Time	Points
1	Klaus Grogorenz	United Team of Germany	48.0	1015
2	Yang Chuan-kwang	Formosa	48.1	1005
3	Rafer Johnson	United States	48.3	985
4	Walter Meier	United Team of Germany	49.5	884
5	Fritz Vogelsang	Switzerland	50.0	844
6	Vasili Kuznetsov	Soviet Union	50.2	828
7	Léopold Marien	Belgium	50.5	807
7	Markus Kahma	Finland	50.5	807
7	Rodolfo Mijares	Mexico	50.5	807
7	Manfred Bock	United Team of Germany	50.5	807
11	Yuri Diachkov	Soviet Union	50.7	793
12	Joze Brodnik	Yugoslavia	51.0	772
13	Yuriy Kutenko	Soviet Union	51.1	765
13	Evert Kamerbeek	Netherlands	51.1	765
15	Herman Timme	Netherlands	51.2	758
16	Hans Muchitsch	Austria	51.3	751
16	Franco Sar	Italy	51.3	751
18	Holm Bjoergvin	Iceland	51.8	716
18	Seppo Suutari	Finland	51.8	716
20	Gurbachan Singh Randhawa	India	52.0	702
21	Philip Mulkey	United States	52.2	690
22	George Stulac	Canada	53.0	642
23	Juris Laipenieks	Chile	53.2	630
24	Panayotis Epitropoulos	Greece	53.6	606
25	Mirko Kolnik	Yugoslavia	53.9	588
26	Héctor Thomas	Venezuela	54.1	576
27	Luciano Paccagnella	Italy	54.3	565
-	Alois Buchel	Liechtenstein	-	Retired
-	Júlio Santos	Portugal	-	Retired

=== 110m hurdles ===
Rank	Athlete	Country	Time	Points
1	Yang Chuan-kwang	Formosa	14.6	923
2	Franco Sar	Italy	14.7	894
3	Evert Kamerbeek	Netherlands	14.9	840
4	Vasili Kuznetsov	Soviet Union	15.0	813
5	Rafer Johnson	United States	15.3	740
5	Fritz Vogelsang	Switzerland	15.3	740
5	Yuri Diachkov	Soviet Union	15.3	740
8	Léopold Marien	Belgium	15.5	694
9	Seppo Suutari	Finland	15.6	673
9	Yuriy Kutenko	Soviet Union	15.6	673
11	Herman Timme	Netherlands	15.7	652
11	Joze Brodnik	Yugoslavia	15.7	652
11	Luciano Paccagnella	Italy	15.7	652
14	Hans Muchitsch	Austria	15.8	632
15	Markus Kahma	Finland	15.9	612
16	Walter Meier	United Team of Germany	16.0	593
17	Manfred Bock	United Team of Germany	16.1	575
18	Holm Bjoergvin	Iceland	16.2	557
19	Gurbachan Singh Randhawa	India	16.4	523
20	Klaus Grogorenz	United Team of Germany	16.9	443
20	Héctor Thomas	Venezuela	16.9	443
22	Juris Laipenieks	Chile	17.1	413
23	Rodolfo Mijares	Mexico	17.3	385
24	Panayotis Epitropoulos	Greece	18.1	283
24	Philip Mulkey	United States	18.1	283
26	George Stulac	Canada	18.4	250
-	Mirko Kolnik	Yugoslavia	-	Did not start

=== Discus throw ===
Rank	Athlete	Country	1	2	3	Mark	Points
1	Vasili Kuznetsov	Soviet Union	44.34	45.05	50.52	50.52	972
2	Franco Sar	Italy	48.98	47.94	49.58	49.58	935
3	Rafer Johnson	United States	44.54	48.24	48.49	48.49	894
4	Luciano Paccagnella	Italy	43.27	42.93	45.67	45.67	797
5	Yuriy Kutenko	Soviet Union	45.48	44.22	45.63	45.63	795
6	Markus Kahma	Finland	44.93	43.32	44.37	44.93	773
7	Evert Kamerbeek	Netherlands	x	42.52	44.31	44.31	753
8	Héctor Thomas	Venezuela	31.33	40.77	x	40.77	648
9	Juris Laipenieks	Chile	36.30	38.25	40.49	40.49	640
10	Klaus Grogorenz	United Team of Germany	38.59	28.98	40.12	40.12	630
11	Yang Chuan-kwang	Formosa	39.83	37.91	36.59	39.83	622
12	Holm Bjoergvin	Iceland	38.78	39.50	36.87	39.50	612
13	Walter Meier	United Team of Germany	39.18	39.09	38.07	39.18	603
14	Herman Timme	Netherlands	36.92	37.95	39.08	39.08	601
15	Seppo Suutari	Finland	x	37.94	x	37.94	571
16	Yuri Diachkov	Soviet Union	37.87	36.47	35.18	37.87	569
17	Manfred Bock	United Team of Germany	x	37.02	37.69	37.69	564
18	Joze Brodnik	Yugoslavia	x	31.24	37.66	37.66	563
19	Rodolfo Mijares	Mexico	34.14	36.61	37.55	37.55	561
20	George Stulac	Canada	34.33	37.35	36.67	37.35	555
21	Fritz Vogelsang	Switzerland	35.54	34.40	37.03	37.03	547
22	Panayotis Epitropoulos	Greece	33.07	34.14	34.68	34.68	487
23	Léopold Marien	Belgium	34.06	33.98	34.28	34.28	477
24	Philip Mulkey	United States	x	34.12	x	34.12	473
25	Hans Muchitsch	Austria	31.79	30.63	30.94	31.79	418
-	Gurbachan Singh Randhawa	India	-	-	-	DNS	-

=== Pole vault ===
Rank	Athlete	Country	Mark	Points
1	Yang Chuan-kwang	Formosa	4.30	915
2	Yuriy Kutenko	Soviet Union	4.20	855
3	Rafer Johnson	United States	4.10	795
3	Joze Brodnik	Yugoslavia	4.10	795
5	Fritz Vogelsang	Switzerland	4.00	745
6	Vasili Kuznetsov	Soviet Union	3.90	695
6	Manfred Bock	United Team of Germany	3.90	695
8	Franco Sar	Italy	3.80	645
8	Yuri Diachkov	Soviet Union	3.80	645
8	Evert Kamerbeek	Netherlands	3.80	645
11	Klaus Grogorenz	United Team of Germany	3.70	596
11	Walter Meier	United Team of Germany	3.70	596
13	Luciano Paccagnella	Italy	3.60	556
13	Markus Kahma	Finland	3.60	556
31	George Stulac	Canada	3.60	556
16	Seppo Suutari	Finland	3.50	516
17	Rodolfo Mijares	Mexico	3.40	476
18	Léopold Marien	Belgium	3.30	438
18	Juris Laipenieks	Chile	3.30	438
18	Holm Bjoergvin	Iceland	3.30	438
18	Herman Timme	Netherlands	3.30	438
22	Hans Muchitsch	Austria	3.20	400
22	Héctor Thomas	Venezuela	3.20	400
-	Panayotis Epitropoulos	Greece	NM	0
-	Philip Mulkey	United States	-	Retired

=== Javelin throw ===
Rank	Athlete	Country	1	2	3	Mark	Points
1	Yuriy Kutenko	Soviet Union	71.44	62.88	70.03	71.44	1031
2	Vasili Kuznetsov	Soviet Union	71.20	61.62	62.12	71.20	1024
3	Rafer Johnson	United States	69.76	67.04	63.90	69.76	980
4	Yang Chuan-kwang	Formosa	65.90	68.22	65.11	68.22	937
5	Joze Brodnik	Yugoslavia	57.70	59.54	65.30	65.30	858
6	Manfred Bock	United Team of Germany	63.63	58.78	-	63.63	817
7	Juris Laipenieks	Chile	55.81	61.44	55.31	61.44	764
8	Klaus Grogorenz	United Team of Germany	58.48	x	60.81	60.81	750
9	Markus Kahma	Finland	60.50	59.93	56.37	60.50	743
10	Seppo Suutari	Finland	49.23	59.86	58.46	59.86	729
11	Evert Kamerbeek	Netherlands	45.40	57.49	49.91	57.49	677
12	Holm Bjoergvin	Iceland	56.69	54.20	57.45	57.45	676
13	Franco Sar	Italy	50.74	55.74	50.64	55.74	641
14	Fritz Vogelsang	Switzerland	48.39	50.94	52.61	52.61	578
15	Herman Timme	Netherlands	51.74	x	x	51.74	561
16	Héctor Thomas	Venezuela	51.15	x	x	51.15	549
17	Panayotis Epitropoulos	Greece	50.38	50.66	50.55	50.66	540
18	George Stulac	Canada	50.40	45.66	50.20	50.40	536
19	Luciano Paccagnella	Italy	48.60	48.09	-	48.60	503
20	Walter Meier	United Team of Germany	47.33	46.74	-	47.33	480
21	Léopold Marien	Belgium	42.57	42.81	44.71	44.71	434
22	Rodolfo Mijares	Mexico	38.99	42.62	43.36	43.36	411
23	Hans Muchitsch	Austria	x	38.44	x	38.44	330
-	Yuri Diachkov	Soviet Union	-	-	-	-	Retired

=== 1500m ===
Rank	Athlete	Country	Time	Points
1	Markus Kahma	Finland	4:22.8	582
2	Hans Muchitsch	Austria	4:23.3	575
3	Klaus Grogorenz	United Team of Germany	4:27.0	536
4	Manfred Bock	United Team of Germany	4:27.6	530
5	Fritz Vogelsang	Switzerland	4:27.7	528
6	Walter Meier	United Team of Germany	4:30.6	500
7	Joze Brodnik	Yugoslavia	4:37.7	434
8	Léopold Marien	Belgium	4:40.0	414
9	Holm Bjoergvin	Iceland	4:40.6	409
10	Evert Kamerbeek	Netherlands	4:43.6	384
11	Yuriy Kutenko	Soviet Union	4:44.2	379
12	Yang Chuan-kwang	Formosa	4:48.5	345
13	Franco Sar	Italy	4:49.2	340
14	Rodolfo Mijares	Mexico	4:49.3	339
15	Rafer Johnson	United States	4:49.7	336
16	Vasili Kuznetsov	Soviet Union	4:53.8	306
17	Panayotis Epitropoulos	Greece	4:55.0	297
18	Luciano Paccagnella	Italy	4:55.4	294
19	Juris Laipenieks	Chile	4:57.5	279
20	George Stulac	Canada	4:59.6	265
21	Seppo Suutari	Finland	5:04.8	231
22	Herman Timme	Netherlands	5:21.4	137
23	Héctor Thomas	Venezuela	5:25.2	116

== Final standings ==
The best scores in each event are highlighted in yellow. These scores were split between six competitors, with the gold medallist Rafer Johnson achieving the best result in the shot put by 104 points.

Pos	Athlete	Country	100m	Long jump	Shot put	High jump	400m	110m hurdles	Discus throw	Pole vault	Javelin throw	1500m	Total points
1st place, gold medalist(s)	Rafer Johnson	United States	10.9; 948	7.35; 906	15.82; 976	1.85; 832	48.3; 985	15.3; 740	48.49; 894	4.10; 795	69.76; 980	4:49.7; 336	8392 (OR)
2nd place, silver medalist(s)	Yang Chuan-kwang	Formosa	10.7; 1034	7.46; 950	13.33; 703	1.90; 900	48.1; 1005	14.6; 923	39.83; 622	4.30; 915	68.22; 937	4:48.5; 345	8334
3rd place, bronze medalist(s)	Vasili Kuznetsov	Soviet Union	11.1; 870	6.96; 773	14.46; 817	1.75; 711	50.2; 828	15.0; 813	50.52; 972	3.90; 695	71.20; 1024	4:53.8; 306	7809
4	Yuriy Kutenko	Soviet Union	11.4; 768	6.93; 764	13.97; 767	1.80; 770	51.1; 765	15.6; 673	45.63; 795	4.20; 855	71.44; 1031	4:44.2; 379	7567
5	Evert Kamerbeek	Netherlands	11.3; 800	7.21; 856	13.76; 746	1.80; 770	51.1; 765	14.9; 840	44.31; 753	3.80; 645	57.49; 677	4:43.6; 384	7236
6	Franco Sar	Italy	11.4; 768	6.69; 692	13.89; 759	1.80; 770	51.1; 765	14.7; 894	49.58; 935	3.80; 645	55.74; 641	4:49.2; 340	7195
7	Markus Kahma	Finland	11.5; 737	6.93; 764	14.55; 827	1.75; 711	50.5; 807	15.9; 612	44.93; 773	3.60; 556	60.50; 743	4:22.8; 582	7112
8	Klaus Grogorenz	United Team of Germany	10.8; 990	6.93; 764	12.42; 619	1.73; 689	48.0; 1015	16.9; 443	40.12; 630	3.70; 596	60.81; 750	4:27.0; 536	7032
9	Joze Brodnik	Yugoslavia	11.6; 707	6.91; 758	12.30; 609	1.80; 770	51.0; 772	15.7; 652	37.66; 563	4.10; 795	65.30; 858	4:37.7; 434	6918
10	Manfred Bock	United Team of Germany	11.4; 768	6.79; 722	12.03; 584	1.85; 832	50.5; 807	16.1; 575	37.69; 564	3.90; 695	63.63; 817	4:27.6; 530	6894
11	Fritz Vogelsang	Switzerland	11.3; 800	6.94; 767	11.78; 562	1.70; 656	50.0; 844	15.3; 740	37.03; 547	4.00; 745	52.61; 578	4:27.7; 528	6767
12	Seppo Suutari	Finland	11.1; 870	6.94; 767	14.96; 872	1.83; 806	51.8; 716	15.6; 673	37.94; 571	3.50; 516	59.86; 729	5:04.8; 231	6751
13	Luciano Paccagnella	Italy	11.8; 650	6.73; 704	14.18; 788	1.80; 770	54.3; 565	15.7; 652	45.67; 797	3.60; 556	48.60; 503	4:55.4; 294	6283
14	Holm Bjoergvin	Iceland	11.8; 650	6.93; 764	13.58; 728	1.75; 711	51.8; 716	16.2; 657	39.50; 612	3.30; 438	57.45; 676	4:40.6; 409	6261
15	Herman Timme	Netherlands	11.3; 800	6.93; 764	13.76; 746	1.83; 806	51.2; 758	15.7; 652	39.08; 601	3.30; 438	51.74; 561	5:21.4; 137	6206
16	Walter Meier	United Team of Germany	11.3; 800	NM	13.68; 738	1.83; 806	49.5; 884	16.0; 593	39.18; 603	3.70; 596	47.33; 480	4:30.6; 500	6000
17	Hans Muchitsch	Austria	11.5; 737	7.14; 932	11.77; 505	1.80; 770	51.3; 751	15.8; 632	31.79; 418	3.20; 400	38.44; 330	4:23.3; 575	5950
18	Léopold Marien	Belgium	11.5; 737	6.62; 672	11.44; 535	1.75; 711	50.5; 807	15.5; 694	34.28; 477	3.30; 438	44.71; 434	4:40.0; 414	5919
19	Juris Laipenieks	Chile	11.6; 707	6.88; 749	12.65; 640	1.65; 605	53.2; 630	17.1; 413	40.49; 640	3.30; 438	61.44; 764	4:57.5; 279	5865
20	Héctor Thomas	Venezuela	11.1; 870	6.81; 728	13.42; 712	1.75; 711	54.1; 576	16.9; 443	40.77; 648	3.20; 400	51.15; 549	5:25.2; 116	5753
21	Rodolfo Mijares	Mexico	11.3; 800	6.20; 562	10.59; 467	1.65; 605	50.5; 807	17.3; 385	37.55; 561	3.40; 476	43.36; 411	4:49.3; 339	5413
22	George Stulac	Canada	12.0; 597	5.92; 493	13.32; 648	1.70; 656	53.0; 642	18.4; 250	37.35; 555	3.60; 556	50.40; 536	4:59.6; 265	5198
23	Panayotis Epitropoulos	Greece	11.7; 638	6.23; 570	12.06; 587	1.73; 689	53.6; 606	18.1; 283	34.68; 487	NM	50.66; 540	4:55.0; 297	4737
Did not finish
	Yuri Diachkov	Soviet Union	11.6; 707	7.12; 825	13.22; 692	1.85; 832	50.7; 793	15.3; 740	37.87; 569	3.80; 645	-	-	5803
	Philip Mulkey	United States	11.5; 737	6.57; 746	14.10; 780	1.83; 806	52.2; 690	18.1; 283	34.12; 473	-	-	-	4515
	Gurbachan Singh Randhawa	India	11.6; 707	6.87; 746	11.35; 528	1.90; 900	52.0; 702	16.4; 523	-	-	-	-	4106
	Mirko Kolnik	Yugoslavia	11.2; 834	6.93; 764	13.10; 681	1.70; 656	53.9; 588	-	-	-	-	-	3523
	Alois Buchel	Liechtenstein	11.5; 737	6.54; 651	9.71; 406	1.73; 689	-	-	-	-	-	-	2483
	Júlio Santos	Portugal	12.0; 597	6.32; 592	10.85; 488	1.65; 605	-	-	-	-	-	-	2282
	Dave Edstrom	United States	11.4; 768	6.39; 610	13.59; 729	-	-	-	-	-	-	-	2107
