= 1958 European Athletics Championships – Men's decathlon =

Men's decathlon at the European Athletics Championships

The men's decathlon at the 1958 European Athletics Championships was held in Stockholm, Sweden, at Stockholms Olympiastadion on 20 and 21 August 1958.

== Medalists ==
Gold	Vasiliy Kuznetsov; Soviet Union
Silver	Uno Palu; Soviet Union
Bronze	Walter Meier; East Germany

== Results ==
=== Final ===
20/21 August

The highest mark recorded in each event is highlighted in yellow

Rank	Name	Nationality	100m	LJ	SP	HJ	400m	110m H	DT	PV	JT	1500m	Points	Notes
1st place, gold medalist(s)	Vasiliy Kuznetsov	Soviet Union	10.8	7.34	14.27	1.80	48.6	14.8	48.57	4.00	59.42	5:00.0	6969 (7865)	CR
2nd place, silver medalist(s)	Uno Palu	Soviet Union	11.2	6.90	13.34	1.90	49.3	15.2	39.07	3.60	57.47	4:17.9	6767 (7329)	
3rd place, bronze medalist(s)	Walter Meier	East Germany	11.1	7.04	14.17	1.83	49.1	15.5	48.80	3.80	49.89	4:20.6	6852 (7249)	
4	Markus Kahma	Finland	11.4	6.73	15.21	1.70	51.0	16.5	46.65	3.60	65.66	4:18.3	6682 (7137)	NR
5	Walter Tschudi	Switzerland	10.9	6.74	13.39	1.70	48.5	15.2	34.83	3.50	48.11	4:20.6	6421 (6858)	
6	Eef Kamerbeek	Netherlands	11.2	6.94	13.15	1.75	50.9	14.9	39.41	3.10	60.30	4:35.4	6530 (6784)	NR
7	Hans-Dieter Möhring	West Germany	11.1	6.56	15.00	1.70	51.1	16.6	45.60		54.49	5:00.8	6219 (6774)	
8	Václav Bečvárovský	Czechoslovakia	11.4	6.55	12.86	1.83	50.8	15.2	41.82	3.70	51.79	4:45.0	6279 (6644)	NR
9	Pétur Rögnvaldsson	Iceland	11.4	6.75	13.48	1.70	51.4	15.1	39.46	3.20	53.21	4:54.1	6157 (6288)	
10	Jože Brodnik	Yugoslavia	11.8	6.20	13.18	1.80	53.1	15.8	35.46		60.48	4:38.5	5985 (6210)	NR
11	Torbjörn Lassenius	Finland	11.9	6.48	12.32	1.70	51.8	15.8	39.68		60.44	4:42.3	6010 (6180)	
12	Hans Muchitsch	Austria	11.1	7.05	10.13	1.80	50.2	15.2	29.36		29.90	4:14.9	5925 (6100)	
13	Per-Martin Haarr	Norway	11.6	6.83	12.67	1.83	54.3	16.3	36.46		61.41	5:04.1	5940 (6079)	
14	Rune Persson	Sweden	11.5	6.35	13.29	1.75	53.2	16.0	37.40		55.80	5:09.8	5802 (5966)	
15	Heinrich Staub	Switzerland	11.6	6.22	11.77	1.80	51.4	15.4	35.37		46.73	4:52.6	5770 (5949)	
16	Jean-Marie Kling	France	11.5	6.67	11.94	1.70	50.1	15.5	37.60		36.02	4:32.3	5883 (5885)	
17	Hermund Høgheim	Norway	11.3	6.58	10.66	1.70	52.7	17.3	31.93		53.54	4:41.0	5604 (5853)	
18	Björgvin Hólm	Iceland	11.7	6.24	12.57	1.70	51.7	15.8	35.74		54.08	4:30.6	5916 (5742)	
	Hermann Timme	Netherlands	11.4	6.29	11.71	1.70	51.2	DNF	37.62				DNF	

== Participation ==
According to an unofficial count, 19 athletes from 13 countries participated in the event.

- Austria (1)
- Czechoslovakia (1)
- East Germany (1)
- Finland (2)
- France (1)
- Iceland (2)
- Netherlands (2)
- Norway (2)
- Soviet Union (2)
- Sweden (1)
- Switzerland (2)
- West Germany (1)
- Yugoslavia (1)
