= 1962 European Athletics Championships – Men's decathlon =

Men's decathlon at the European Athletics Championships

The men's decathlon at the 1962 European Athletics Championships was held in Belgrade, then Yugoslavia, at JNA Stadium on 13 and 14 September 1962.

== Medalists ==
Gold	Vasiliy Kuznetsov; Soviet Union
Silver	Werner von Moltke; West Germany
Bronze	Manfred Bock; West Germany

== Results ==
=== Final ===
13/14 September

The highest mark recorded in each event is highlighted in yellow

Rank	Name	Nationality	100m	LJ	SP	HJ	400m	110m H	DT	PV	JT	1500m	Points	Notes
1st place, gold medalist(s)	Vasiliy Kuznetsov	Soviet Union	10.8	6.91	14.32	1.75	49.3	14.5	48.08	3.90	68.08	4:41.0	7653 (8026)	CR
2nd place, silver medalist(s)	Werner von Moltke	West Germany	10.7	7.03	14.93	1.80	49.7	14.8	49.41	4.25	56.17	4:46.9	7637 (8022)	NR
3rd place, bronze medalist(s)	Manfred Bock	West Germany	10.8w	6.96	13.25	1.86	48.6	14.7	39.47	3.90	62.65	4:22.9	7562 (7835)	
4	Eef Kamerbeek	Netherlands	11.1	7.03	14.13	1.83	50.9	14.5	47.44	3.80	63.62	4:39.2	7500 (7724)	NR
5	Willi Holdorf	West Germany	10.5	7.08	14.00	1.75	48.7	15.1	44.43	3.60	50.98	4:30.0	7355 (7523)	
6	Yuriy Dyachkov	Soviet Union	11.1	7.12	13.59	1.86	49.8	14.9	43.09	4.00	52.37	4:41.7	7299 (7400)	
7	Mirko Kolnik	Yugoslavia	10.7w	6.81	13.82	1.75	50.3	15.7	41.95	4.45	55.54	4:53.3	7199 (7348)	
8	Jože Brodnik	Yugoslavia	11.3	6.80	13.15	1.83	51.4	15.4	39.25	4.00	63.99	4:27.4	7185 (7183)	
9	Markus Kahma	Finland	11.3	6.60	15.01	1.65	50.9	15.8	47.87	3.70	56.87	4:24.7	7085 (7052)	
10	Valbjörn Þorláksson	Iceland	11.0	6.47	11.77	1.80	51.1	15.6	39.62	4.30	56.50	4:54.0	6866 (6800)	
11	Jean-René Monneret	France	11.0w	6.41	12.74	1.83	51.0	15.7	32.30	4.15	53.63	5:03.0	6646 (6498)	
12	German Klimov	Soviet Union	10.8	7.10	13.70	1.83	49.6	15.9	38.85	NM	50.19	4:47.2	6201 (6323)	
13	Franco Sar	Italy	11.3	6.31	13.16	1.75	52.7	15.0	45.82	3.50	52.53	5:06.8	6583 (6288)	
14	Léopold Marien	Belgium	11.1w	6.02	10.84	1.65	50.0	14.6	34.76	3.20	47.64	4:28.6	6367 (6141)	
15	Gyula Hubai	Hungary	11.3	6.31	12.05	1.75	54.5	16.1	43.41	3.80	43.84	5:21.2	6139 (5741)	
	Seppo Suutari	Finland	10.8	6.99	15.19	1.86	51.0	15.3	39.36	NM			DNF	
	Stoyan Slavkov	Bulgaria	11.1w	6.70									DNF	

== Participation ==
According to an unofficial count, 17 athletes from 11 countries participated in the event.

- Belgium (1)
- Bulgaria (1)
- Finland (2)
- France (1)
- Hungary (1)
- Iceland (1)
- Italy (1)
- Netherlands (1)
- Soviet Union (3)
- West Germany (3)
- Yugoslavia (2)
