= Athletics at the 1956 Summer Olympics – Men's decathlon =

Men's decathlon at the Games of the XVI Olympiad
- Venue: Melbourne Cricket Ground
- Date: November 29–30, 1956
- Competitors: 15 from 8 nations
- Winning points: 7937

Medalists
1st place, gold medalist(s)		Milt Campbell	United States
2nd place, silver medalist(s)		Rafer Johnson	United States
3rd place, bronze medalist(s)		Vasili Kuznetsov	Soviet Union

Pathe Highlights

The Men's decathlon competition at the 1956 Summer Olympics in Melbourne, Australia was held at the Melbourne Cricket Ground on November 29–30.

== Competition format ==
The decathlon consists of ten track and field events, with a points system that awards higher scores for better results in each of the ten components. The athletes all compete in one competition with no elimination rounds.

== Records ==
Prior to the competition, the existing World and Olympic records were as follows.

World record	Rafer Johnson (USA)	7985	Kingsburg, United States	June 11, 1955
Olympic record	Bob Mathias (USA)	7887	Helsinki, Finland	July 26, 1952

== Schedule ==
All times are local

Date	Time	Round
Thursday, November 29, 1956	10:00; 11:00; 14:15; 16:00; 18:30	100 metres Long Jump; Shot Put; High Jump; 400 metres
Friday, November 30, 1956	09:00; 10:00; 13:15; 16:15; 18:30	110 metres hurdles Discus Throw; Pole Vault; Javelin Throw; 1500 metres

== Overall results ==
Key

The highest mark recorded in each event is highlighted in yellow

Rank	Athlete	Overall points	100 m	LJ	SP	HJ	400 m	110 m H	DT	PV	JT	1500 m
1st place, gold medalist(s)	Milt Campbell (USA)	7937	990; 10.8 s	898; 7.33 m	850; 14.76 m	886; 1.89 m	940; 48.8 s	1124; 14.0 s	775; 44.98 m	476; 3.40 m	668; 57.08 m	330; 4:50.6 min
2nd place, silver medalist(s)	Rafer Johnson (USA)	7587	948; 10.9 s	902; 7.34 m	819; 14.48 m	806; 1.83 m	900; 49.3 s	788; 15.1 s	688; 42.17 m	695; 3.90 m	738; 60.27 m	303; 4:54.2 min
3rd place, bronze medalist(s)	Vasili Kuznetsov (URS)	7465	834; 11.2 s	798; 7.04 m	820; 14.49 m	711; 1.75 m	828; 50.2 s	840; 14.9 s	754; 44.33 m	720; 3.95 m	854; 65.13 m	306; 4:53.8 min
4	Uno Palu (URS)	6930	737; 11.5 s	681; 6.65 m	709; 13.39 m	886; 1.89 m	786; 50.8 s	716; 15.4 s	637; 40.38 m	556; 3.60 m	768; 61.59 m	454; 4:35.6 min
5	Martin Lauer (EUA)	6853	870; 11.1 s	734; 6.83 m	659; 12.86 m	806; 1.83 m	995; 48.2 s	894; 14.7 s	609; 39.38 m	364; 3.10 m	540; 50.66 m	382; 4:43.8 min
6	Walter Meier (EUA)	6773	800; 11.3 s	725; 6.80 m	671; 12.99 m	845; 1.86 m	900; 49.3 s	575; 16.1 s	562; 37.59 m	596; 3.70 m	492; 47.97 m	607; 4:20.6 min
7	Torbjörn Lassenius (FIN)	6565	650; 11.8 s	672; 6.62 m	715; 13.45 m	656; 1.70 m	786; 50.8 s	612; 15.9 s	664; 41.36 m	645; 3.80 m	717; 59.33 m	448; 4:36.2 min
8	Yang Chuan-kwang (ROC)	6521	834; 11.2 s	755; 6.90 m	544; 11.56 m	976; 1.95 m	751; 51.3 s	813; 15.0 s	469; 33.92 m	438; 3.30 m	685; 57.88 m	256; 5:00.8 min
9	Pat Leane (AUS)	6427	768; 11.4 s	722; 6.79 m	696; 13.26 m	845; 1.86 m	772; 51.0 s	523; 16.4 s	595; 38.86 m	516; 3.50 m	706; 58.83 m	284; 4:56.8 min
10	John Cann (AUS)	6278	948; 10.9 s	659; 6.57 m	598; 12.18 m	656; 1.70 m	900; 49.3 s	673; 15.6 s	592; 38.76 m	226; 2.70 m	686; 57.89 m	340; 4:49.2 min
11	Ian Bruce (AUS)	6025	678; 11.7 s	672; 6.62 m	609; 12.30 m	806; 1.83 m	751; 51.3 s	612; 15.9 s	536; 36.62 m	476; 3.40 m	554; 51.38 m	331; 4:50.4 min
12	Najmeddin Farabi (IRN)	5103	572; 12.1 s	575; 6.25 m	524; 11.31 m	656; 1.70 m	684; 52.3 s	372; 17.4 s	347; 28.73 m	438; 3.30 m	375; 41.23 m	560; 4:24.8 min
—N/a	Bob Richards (USA)	DNF	678; 11.7 s	610; 6.39 m	628; 12.52 m	711; 1.75 m	684; 52.3 s	458; 16.8 s	566; 37.77 m	1023; 4.45 m	423; 44.09 m	DNS
—N/a	Yuriy Kutenko (URS)	DNF	707; 11.6 s	678; 6.64 m	817; 14.46 m	NM	807; 50.5 s	632; 15.8 s	861; 47.57 m	795; 4.10 m	DNS	DNS
—N/a	Walter Herssens (BEL)	DNF	650; 11.8 s	656; 6.56 m	509; 11.12 m	770; 1.80 m	DNS	DNS	DNS	DNS	DNS	DNS
—N/a	Georgios Roubanis (GRE)	DNS	DNS	DNS	DNS	DNS	DNS	DNS	DNS	DNS	DNS	DNS
—N/a	Reinaldo Oliver (PUR)	DNS	DNS	DNS	DNS	DNS	DNS	DNS	DNS	DNS	DNS	DNS
—N/a	Chun-tsai Wu (TPE)	DNS	DNS	DNS	DNS	DNS	DNS	DNS	DNS	DNS	DNS	DNS
