= Athletics at the 1959 Pan American Games – Men's decathlon =

Men's decathlon at the Pan American Games

The men's decathlon event at the 1959 Pan American Games was held at the Soldier Field in Chicago on 30 and 31 August.

== Results ==
The highest mark recorded in each event is highlighted in yellow

Rank	Athlete	Nationality	100m	LJ	SP	HJ	400m	110m H	DT	PV	JT	1500m	Points	Notes
1st place, gold medalist(s)	Dave Edstrom	United States	11.2	7.06	14.26	1.79	49.4	15.0	45.59	3.70	55.82	4:51.2	7254	
2nd place, silver medalist(s)	Phil Mulkey	United States	12.1	6.63	14.26	1.76	53.6	15.7	37.56	4.00	43.25	4:51.3	6062	
3rd place, bronze medalist(s)	George Stulac	Canada	11.5	6.44	12.92	1.73	51.9	16.6	39.74	3.70	45.53	4:39.9	5989	
4	Héctor Thomas	Venezuela	11.2	7.05	12.67	1.73	55.5	17.1	38.28	3.10	55.44	5:16.7	5625	
5	Emir Martínez	Argentina	11.7	6.20	12.98	1.65	53.7	16.7	38.48	3.25	45.07	4:35.2	5489	
6	Juris Laipenieks	Chile	11.7	6.73	13.24	1.65	53.4	17.5	40.67	2.90	54.96	5:01.5	5472	
7	Rodolfo Mijares	Mexico	11.3	6.44	10.89	1.60	51.6	16.7	36.96	3.20	35.36	4:52.8	5213	
8	Leopoldo Vásquez	Mexico	12.1	6.42	10.30	1.79	54.2	16.4	31.77	3.10	42.71	4:54.2	4969	
	Mike Herman	United States	DNS	–	–	–	–	–	–	–	–	–	DNS	
