= Chile at the 1960 Summer Olympics =

- IOC code: CHI (CIL used at these Games)
- NOC: Chilean Olympic Committee

in Rome
- Competitors: 9 (8 men, 1 woman) in 3 sports
- Flag bearer: Marlene Ahrens
- Medals: Gold 0 Silver 0 Bronze 0 Total 0

Summer Olympics appearances (overview)
- 1896; 1900–1908; 1912; 1920; 1924; 1928; 1932; 1936; 1948; 1952; 1956; 1960; 1964; 1968; 1972; 1976; 1980; 1984; 1988; 1992; 1996; 2000; 2004; 2008; 2012; 2016; 2020; 2024; 2028

Chile at the 1960 Summer Olympics in Rome, Italy was the nation's eleventh appearance out of fourteen editions of the Summer Olympic Games. The nation was represented by a team of 9 athletes, 8 men and 1 woman, that competed in 8 events in 3 sports.

== Athletics ==
Key

- Note–Ranks given for track events are within the athlete's heat only
- Q = Qualified for the next round

Men
Track & road events

Athlete	Event	Heat		Final	
Athlete	Event	Result	Rank	Result	Rank
José Aceituno	5000 m	DNF		Did not advance	
José Aceituno	10,000 m	—N/a		DNS	
Juan Silva	Marathon	—N/a		2:31:18.0	33

Combined events – Decathlon

Athlete	Event	100 m	LJ	SP	HJ	400 m	110H	DT	PV	JT	1500 m	Final	Rank
Juris Laipenieks	Result	11.6	6.88	12.65	1.65	53.2	17.1	40.49	3.30	61.44	4:57.5	5865	19
Juris Laipenieks	Points	707	749	640	605	630	413	640	438	764	279	5865	19

Women
Field events

Athlete	Event	Qualification		Final	
Athlete	Event	Result	Rank	Result	Rank
Marlene Ahrens	Javelin throw	48.36	11	47.53	12

== Shooting ==
Two shooters represented Chile in 1960.

Trap

- Juan Enrique Lira
- Gilberto Navarro
