= Iceland at the 1960 Summer Olympics =

- IOC code: ISL
- NOC: Olympic Committee of Iceland

in Rome
- Competitors: 9 in 2 sports
- Flag bearer: Pétur Rögnvaldsson
- Medals: Gold 0 Silver 0 Bronze 0 Total 0

Summer Olympics appearances (overview)
- 1908; 1912; 1920–1932; 1936; 1948; 1952; 1956; 1960; 1964; 1968; 1972; 1976; 1980; 1984; 1988; 1992; 1996; 2000; 2004; 2008; 2012; 2016; 2020; 2024

Iceland competed at the 1960 Summer Olympics in Rome, Italy.

== Results by event ==
=== Athletics ===
Key

- Note – Ranks given for track events are within the athlete's heat only
- Q = Qualified for the next round
- q = Qualified for the next round as a fastest loser or, in field events, by position without achieving the qualifying target
- NR = National record
- N/A = Round not applicable for the event
- Bye = Athlete not required to compete in round

Men
Track & road events

Athlete	Event	Heat		Quarterfinals		Semifinal		Final	
Athlete	Event	Result	Rank	Result	Rank	Result	Rank	Result	Rank
Hilmar Þorbjörnsson	100 m	10.9	4	did not advance					
Hilmar Þorbjörnsson	200 m	DNS		did not advance					
Svavar Markússon	800 m	1:52.88	5	did not advance					
Svavar Markússon	1500 m	3:47.20	7	—N/a				did not advance	
Pétur Rögnvaldsson	110 m hurdles	15.38	6	did not advance					

Field events

Athlete	Event	Qualification		Final	
Athlete	Event	Distance	Position	Distance	Position
Vilhjálmur Einarsson	long jump	6.76	42	did not advance	
Vilhjálmur Einarsson	triple jump	15.74	8	16.37	5
Jón Pétursson	high jump	1.95	24	did not advance	
Valbjörn Þorláksson	pole vault	4.20	14	did not advance	

Combined events – Decathlon

Athlete	Event	100 m	LJ	SP	HJ	400 m	110H	DT	PV	JT	1500 m	Final	Rank
Björgvin Hólm	Result	11.8	6.93	13.58	1.75	51.8	16.2	39.50	3.30	57.45	4:40.6	6261	14
Björgvin Hólm	Points	650	764	728	711	716	557	612	438	676	409	6261	14

=== Swimming ===
Men

Athlete	Event	Heat		Semifinal		Final	
Athlete	Event	Time	Rank	Time	Rank	Time	Rank
Guðmundur Gíslason	100 m freestyle	1:00.8	41	Did not advance			

Women

Athlete	Event	Heat		Semifinal		Final	
Athlete	Event	Time	Rank	Time	Rank	Time	Rank
Ágústa Þorsteinsdóttir	100 m freestyle	1:07.5	=22	Did not advance			
