= Kamerbeek =

Kamerbeek is a Dutch surname. People with this name include:

- Eef Kamerbeek (1934–2008), Dutch decathlete
- Henk Kamerbeek (1893–1954), Dutch hammer thrower
- Jan Coenraad Kamerbeek (1907–1998), Dutch classical scholar
