= Athletics at the 1959 Summer Universiade – Men's pentathlon =

The men's pentathlon event at the 1959 Summer Universiade was held at the Stadio Comunale di Torino in Turin on 3 September 1959. It was the only time men contested the pentathlon at the Universiade with it being replaced with the decathlon from the next edition.

== Results ==
The highest mark recorded in each event is highlighted in yellow

Rank	Athlete	Nationality	LJ	JT	200m	DT	1500m	Points	Notes
1st place, gold medalist(s)	Vasili Kuznetsov	Soviet Union	7.18	72.70	22.2	49.50	4:59.5	4006	WB
2nd place, silver medalist(s)	Hermann Salomon	West Germany	6.18	74.45	23.9	43.07	4:30.4	3530	
3rd place, bronze medalist(s)	Miloš Vojtek	Czechoslovakia	6.47	66.63	24.0	37.46	4:47.2	3048	
4	Victor Cinca	Romania	6.83	50.60	23.0	32.67	4:33.5	2935	
5	Herbert Stichnote	West Germany	6.03	43.31	24.0	31.08	3:57.9	2880	
6	Carlo Stanga	Switzerland	7.02	39.15	23.1	30.44	4:25.4	2808	
7	Franco Radman	Italy	6.61	52.74	23.7	33.55	4:51.1	2685	
8	Franz Thomet	Switzerland	6.31	46.39	23.4	32.91	4:35.6	2669	
	Luciano Paccagnella	Italy						DNF	
