= Chen An-hu =

Taiwanese sport shooter (born 1924)

Personal information
- Born: 31 December 1924 Beijing, China

Sport
- Sport: Sports shooting

Chen An-Hu (Chinese: 陳芴; pinyin: Chén Hū; born 31 December 1924) is a Taiwanese former sport shooter. Born in Beijing, he escaped to Taiwan during the Chinese Civil War. He is best known for competing in the 1960 Summer Olympics.

Chen was hired by the Combined Logistics Command as an engineer after his retirement from sport shooting. From 10 to 20 June 2004, a group of former Combined Logistics Command engineers, including 80-year old Chen, who had retired years ago, took part in the investigation of the March 19 shooting incident of by simulating the shooting in a Los Angeles shooting range. Fellow Olympian Yang Chuan-kwang had confessed to Chen before his death that he had purposely slowed down in the 1960 Summer Olympics so Rafer Johnson, who would eventually be too old to compete, could win the gold medal; Yang won the silver medal. This claim had been contested by historian Lin Bo-wen, noting that Yang had been distracted as he was dating an Italian woman and would go out with her every day his entire duration at Rome.
