= Werner von Moltke =

German decathlete (1936–2019)

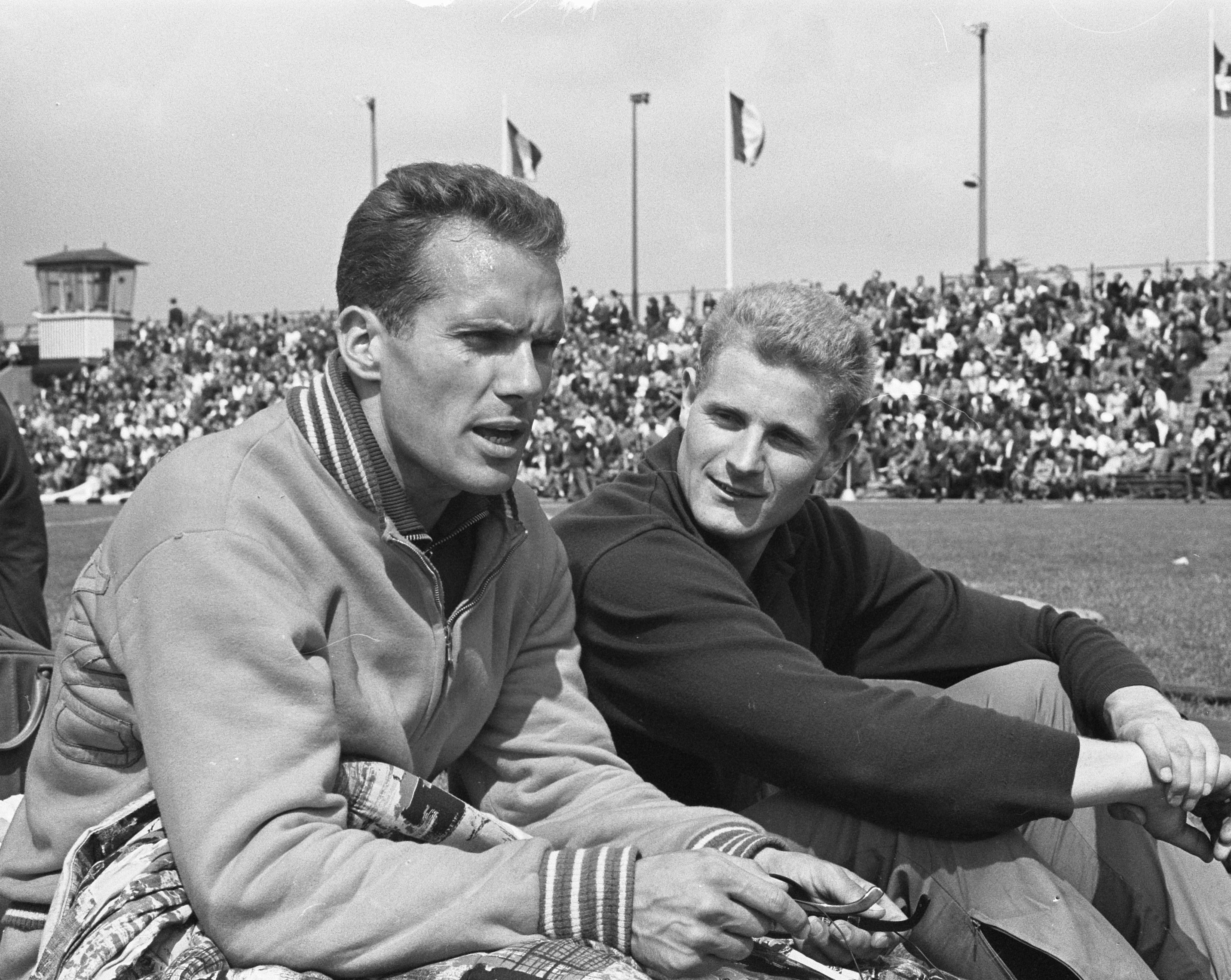
- Eef Kamerbeek and Werner von Moltke in 1963

Personal information
- Born: 24 May 1936 Mühlhausen, Germany
- Died: 29 July 2019 (aged 83) Nieder-Olm
- Height: 1.90 m (6 ft 3 in)
- Weight: 90 kg (198 lb)

Sport
- Sport: Decathlon
- Club: Universitätssportclub Mainz
Medal record
Men's athletics
Representing West Germany
European Championships
Gold medal – first place	1966 Budapest	Decathlon
Silver medal – second place	1962 Belgrade	Decathlon

Werner Konrad Graf von (count of) Moltke (24 May 1936 – 29 July 2019) was a German decathlete who won a European title in 1966 and finished second in 1962. He competed at the 1968 Summer Olympics, but failed to finish.

Von Moltke died on 29 July 2019.
