= Ma Chen-shan =

Taiwanese sports shooter

Personal information
- Full name: 馬晴山, Pinyin: Mǎ Qíng-shān
- Born: 21 May 1926 Tongliao, Liaobei, China

Sport
- Sport: Sports shooting

Ma Chen-shan (born 21 May 1926) is a Chinese former sports shooter. After escaping to Taiwan alongside the Republic of China, he competed as part of Taiwan in the 25 metre pistol event at the 1964 Summer Olympics. He is best known for defecting to China after the competitions as well as allegedly poisoning Yang Chuan-kwang.

== Biography ==
Ma was born on 21 May 1926 in Tongliao, Liaobei, China. He joined the National Revolutionary Army at a young age and would follow the Army in their retreat to Taiwan in 1949. After his tenure, he would work at the Highway Bureau and eventually settling for sports shooting, accomplished enough to warrant a space to the 1964 Summer Olympics. Ma was increasingly homesick and critical of the conditions at Taiwan, prompting him and cameraman Chan Jue to defect during the Olympics. Ma was friendly to decathlete Yang Chuan-kwang, handing drinks frequently to him; Yang purported that they had poisoned him which contributed to his sluggish performance.

Ma and Chan respectively went to a local overseas Chinese organization and the embassy of the Soviet Union in Tokyo; the Japanese agreed to let them go, but due to difficulties caused by their lack of contact with the People's Republic of China, the duo travelled to Tianjin through a Norwegian vessel to a hero's welcome; they were reunited with their family whom they had abandoned on their retreat in 1949.

Ma was honored and assigned to be the coach of China's sports shooting team, even going back to Japan for a cultural exchange in the 1980s. He retired in the 1980s after being promoted to vice chairman of the physical education department of Liaoning.

He turned 100 on 21 May 2026.
