= Fritz Vogelsang =

Swiss decathlete

Personal information
- Nationality: Swiss
- Born: 17 November 1932 (age 92); Aarau, Switzerland

Sport
- Sport: Athletics
- Event: Decathlon

Fritz Vogelsang (born 17 November 1932) is a Swiss athlete. He competed in the men's decathlon at the 1960 Summer Olympics.
