= Najmeddin Farabi =

Iranian decathlete (1933–2019)

Personal information
- Nationality: Iranian
- Born: 5 December 1933 Birjand, Iran
- Died: 9 June 2019 (aged 85) Tehran, Iran

Sport
- Sport: Athletics
- Event: Decathlon

Najmeddin Farabi (Persian: نجم‌الدین فارابی; 5 December 1933 – 9 June 2019) was an Iranian athlete. He competed in the men's decathlon at the 1956 Summer Olympics.
