= Phil Mulkey =

American track and field athlete (1933–2022)

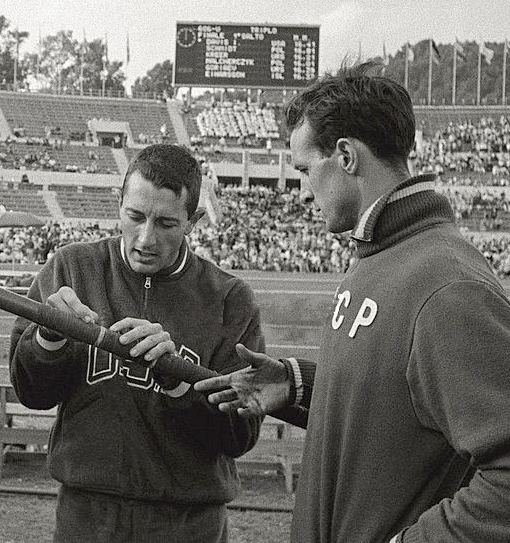
- Mulkey (left) and Kuznetsov at the 1960 Olympics

Personal information
- Born: January 7, 1933 Monett, Missouri, U.S.
- Died: September 17, 2022 (aged 89)
- Height: 178 cm (5 ft 10 in)
- Weight: 75 kg (165 lb)

Sport
- Sport: Athletics
- Event: Decathlon
- Club: Memphis State College; University of Wyoming

Achievements and titles
- Personal bests: 120 yH – 14.4 (1962); HJ – 1.99 m (1962); PV – 4.52 m (1962); LJ – 7.43 m (1960); TJ – 14.57 m (1962); SP – 16.66 m (1961); DT – 48.69 m (1964); JT – 67.44 m (1961); Decathlon – 8049 (1961)
Medal record
Representing United States
Pan American Games
Silver medal – second place	1959 Chicago	Decathlon

Philip Roy Mulkey (January 7, 1933 – September 17, 2022) was an American track and field athlete, primarily known for the multi-event decathlon. Mulkey was the second place American behind Rafer Johnson at the 1960 USA Outdoor Track and Field Championships which served as Olympic Trials. He failed to finish the 1960 Olympic competition, dropping out after the discus throw. Mulkey had been a competitor at the 1952 Olympic Trials finishing 17th as a high schooler from Purdy, Missouri and the 1956 Olympic Trials finishing 7th representing the University of Wyoming.

Mulkey placed second at the 1959 Pan American Games behind Dave Edstrom. In 1961 he surpassed Vasili Kuznetsov's world record by scoring 8,727 points at the Southeastern AAU (the equivalent of USATF in the day) meet in his home town of Memphis, Tennessee, but the record was never ratified by the IAAF because the field was not approved.

Mulkey competed for Memphis State College and then the University of Wyoming. He never quit the sport, moving from the open division into the early days of masters athletics. He competed at many Masters Athletics World Championships and set several world records as he progressed through the age groups. His M60 American Record was decertified as the American record after World Masters Athletics changed the implement specifications, but it remains the best mark. He coached his then girlfriend Philipa Raschker (Phil and Phil), one of the most successful Masters athletes ever. Both Phils each were named the 1993 and 1994 USATF Combined Athletes of the year.

In later years, he lived in Birmingham, Alabama. Mulkey has spent many years coaching at The Altamont School, with numerous state titles to his team's credits. He was at one time the hurdles coach at Vestavia Hills High School.

Mulkey died on September 17, 2022, at the age of 89.
