= Rodolfo Mijares =

Mexican track and field athlete (1938–2018)

Rodolfo Mijares Garza (17 July 1938 – 2 April 2018) was a Mexican track and field athlete who competed in the decathlon at the 1960 Summer Olympics. He also competed at the 1959 Pan American Games, finishing seventh. He won the athletics pentathlon at the 1959 Central American and Caribbean Games, becoming the second Mexican to do, so after Amador Terán.

== International competitions ==
Year	Competition	Venue	Position	Event	Notes
Representing Mexico
1959	CAC Games	Caracas, Venezuela	8th	Long jump	6.25 m
1959	CAC Games	Caracas, Venezuela	1st	Pentathlon	2723 pts
1959	Pan American Games	Chicago, United States	7th	Decathlon	5213 pts
1960	Olympic Games	Rome, Italy	21st	Decathlon	5413 pts
1960	Ibero-American Games	Santiago, Chile	16th (h)	100 m	11.1
1960	Ibero-American Games	Santiago, Chile	–	Decathlon	DNF
