= Júlio Santos (athlete) =

Portuguese decathlete

Personal information
- Full name: Júlio Augusto Jordão Vilar Santos
- Nationality: Portuguese
- Born: 30 May 1936 Cascais, Portugal
- Died: 22 November 2018 (aged 82)

Sport
- Sport: Athletics
- Event: Decathlon

Júlio Augusto Jordão Vilar Santos (30 May 1936 – 22 November 2018) was a Portuguese athlete. He competed in the men's decathlon at the 1960 Summer Olympics.
