= Journey to the Center of the Earth (1959 film) =

1959 film by Henry Levin

- Theatrical release poster
- Directed by: Henry Levin
- Written by: Charles Brackett; Walter Reisch
- Based on: Journey to the Center of the Earth by Jules Verne
- Produced by: Charles Brackett
- Starring: Pat Boone; James Mason; Arlene Dahl; Diane Baker
- Cinematography: Leo Tover
- Edited by: Stuart Gilmore; Jack W. Holmes
- Music by: Bernard Herrmann
- Production companies: Cooga Mooga Film Productions, Inc. Joseph M. Schenck Enterprises, Inc.
- Distributed by: 20th Century Fox
- Release date: December 16, 1959
- Running time: 129 minutes
- Country: United States
- Language: English
- Budget: $3.44 million
- Box office: $10 million

Journey to the Center of the Earth (also called Jules Verne's Journey to the Center of the Earth) is a 1959 American science fiction adventure film directed by Henry Levin and starring James Mason, Pat Boone, Arlene Dahl, and Diane Baker. Based on the 1864 novel of the same name by Jules Verne, it was written for the screen by Charles Brackett (who also produced) and Walter Reisch. Bernard Herrmann wrote the film score.

The film was released by 20th Century Fox on December 16, 1959. It was a commercial success and well received by critics, earning three Academy Award nominations.

== Plot ==
In 1880 Edinburgh, Professor Sir Oliver Lindenbrook, a geologist at the University of Edinburgh, is given a piece of volcanic rock by his admiring student, Alec McEwan, who is in love with Lindenbrook's niece Jenny. Finding the rock unusually heavy, Lindenbrook discovers a plumb bob inside bearing a cryptic inscription. Lindenbrook and Alec discover that it was left by a scientist named Arne Saknussemm, who, almost 100 years earlier, had found a passage to the center of the Earth by descending into the volcano Snæfellsjökull, in western Iceland. After translating the message, Lindenbrook immediately sets off with Alec to follow in the Icelandic pioneer's footsteps.

Professor Göteborg, upon receiving correspondence from Lindenbrook regarding the message, attempts to reach the Earth's center first. Lindenbrook and McEwan chase him to Iceland. There, Göteborg and his assistant kidnap and imprison them in a cellar. They are freed by local Hans Bjelke and his pet duck Gertrud. They later find Göteborg dead in his hotel room. Lindenbrook finds potassium cyanide crystals in Göteborg's goatee and concludes that he was murdered.

Göteborg's widow, Carla, who initially believed Lindenbrook was trying to capitalize on her deceased husband's work, learns the truth. She provides the equipment and supplies that her husband had accumulated, including much sought after Ruhmkorff lamps, but only on the condition that she accompanies them to protect her husband's reputation. Lindenbrook grudgingly agrees. Hans and Gertrud also join the new expedition.

On a specific date, they mark the sunrise's exact location on Snæfellsjökull and descend into the Earth from there, following markings left by Saknussemm. However, they are not alone. Göteborg's murderer, Count Saknussemm, believes that, as Saknussemm's descendant, only he has the right to be there. He and his manservant trail the group secretly. When Alec becomes separated from the others, he comes upon Saknussemm. When Alec refuses to take the place of Saknussemm's servant, who has died from overexertion, Saknussemm shoots Alec in the arm. Lindenbrook locates them through the gunshot's echoes and, after a quick trial for murder, sentences Saknussemm to death. No one is willing to execute him, however, so they reluctantly take him along.

The explorers eventually come upon a subterranean ocean. They construct a raft to cross it, but not before narrowly escaping a family of large dimetrodons. Their raft begins circling in a large mid-ocean whirlpool. The professor deduces that this must be the center of the Earth: The magnetic forces of north and south meet there and are powerful enough to snatch away even the gold in their rings and tooth fillings. Now completely exhausted, they reach the opposite shore.

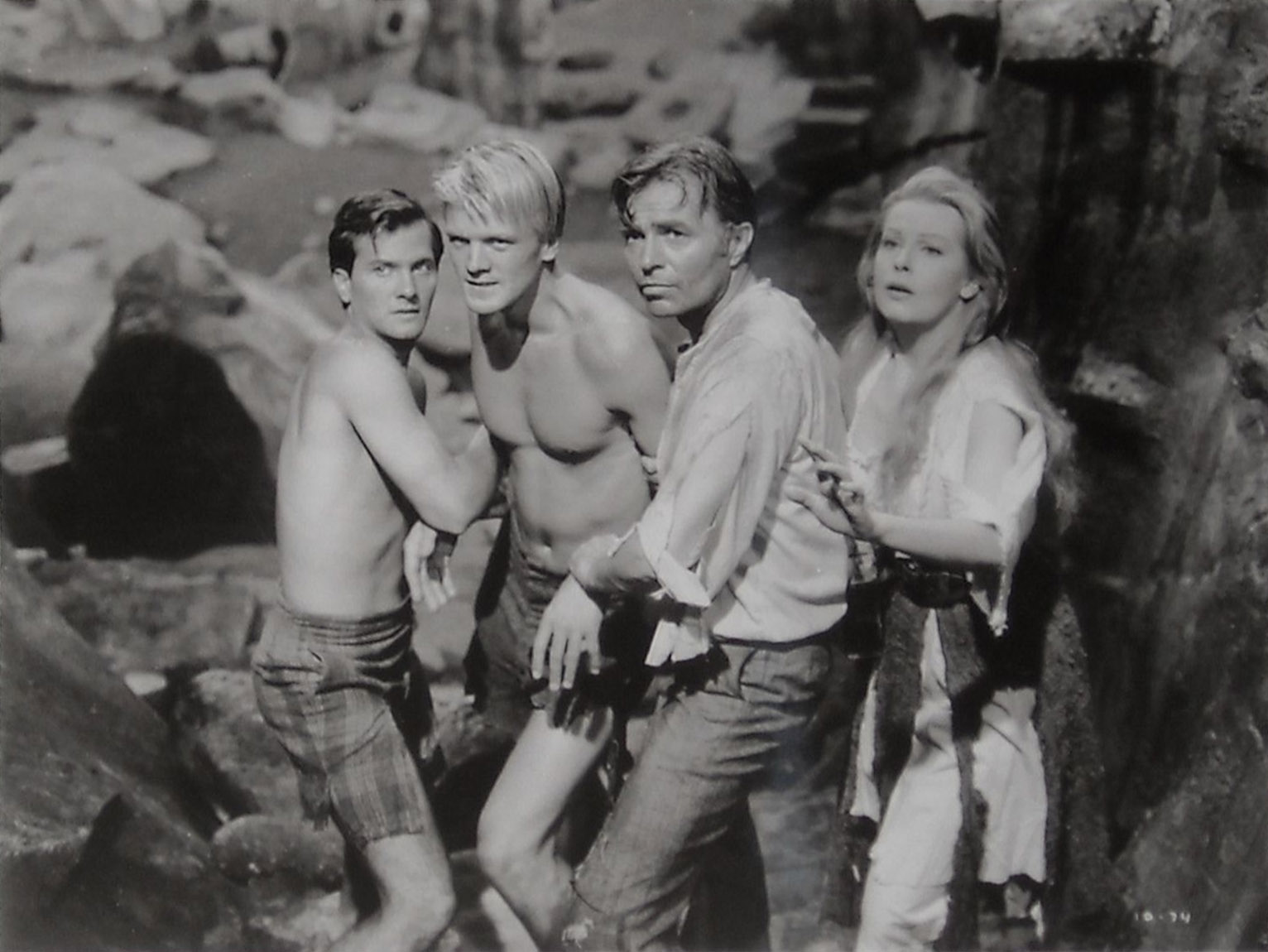
L-R: Pat Boone, Peter Ronson, James Mason, and Arlene Dahl

While the others are asleep, a hungry Saknussemm catches and eats Gertrud. When Hans finds out, he rushes at the count. Reeling back, Saknussemm inadvertently loosens a column of large stones and is buried beneath them, killing him. Right behind the collapse, the group comes upon the ruins of the sunken city of Atlantis. They also find the skeleton of Arne Saknussemm, whose right hand points toward a volcanic chimney. While a strong updraft suggests it leads directly to the surface, a huge rock partially blocks the way. Lindenbrook decides to blow up the obstruction with gunpowder left by Saknussemm, and they take shelter in a large sacrificial altar bowl. A giant lizard attacks, but is buried under molten lava released by the explosion. The bowl floats toward the passage and is finally driven upward at great speed by a lava plume. It finally reaches the surface, where the explorers are ejected, coming down away from the lava eruption.

When they return to Edinburgh, they are hailed as heroes. Lindenbrook turns down all the honors due to the loss of their documented evidence, but encourages the next generations to follow in their footsteps. Alec soon marries Jenny, and Lindenbrook and Carla kiss, a pledge of their coming wedding.

== Cast ==
- James Mason as Sir Oliver Lindenbrook
- Pat Boone as Alec McEwan
- Arlene Dahl as Carla Göteborg
- Diane Baker as Jenny Lindenbrook
- Peter Ronson as Hans Bjelke
- Thayer David as Count Saknussemm
- Bob Adler as Groom
- Alan Napier as Dean
- Ivan Triesault as Professor Göteborg
- Alex Finlayson as Professor Boyle
- Ben Wright as Paisley
- Mary Brady as Kristy

== Production ==
The film was a co-production between 20th Century-Fox and Joseph M. Schenck, who had been instrumental in helping establish Fox in 1935. The film was produced by Charles Brackett, who said:

Our picture describes action and events, with not the slightest shadow of Freud. The serious thing about Jules Verne is that all he does is tell a story in exciting episodes, but his stories have always pushed man a little closer towards the unknown. What we've tried to do is retell his story in the best way of all - in the Verne vernacular.

Brackett called the original story "a delightful book, written for young people. We simply couldn't have any solemnity about it. I wanted very much to do it at this time. I'm tired of all these films based on thoughts at the back of sick minds."

The script was written by Walter Reisch who later said:

I had written a lot of science fiction for magazines, and Charles Brackett knew about that. They also knew that I had written magazine articles on Jules Verne. I had studied Jules Verne, and always wanted to write his biography, but I never got around to doing it. When they bought the Jules Verne novel from his estate and assigned me, I was delighted. The master's work, though a beautiful basic idea, went in a thousand directions and never achieved a real constructive "roundness". With the exception of the basic idea, there is very little of the novel left in the film. I invented a lot of new characters—the Pat Boone part, the part of the professor's wife played by Arlene Dahl, the [part of the] villain—and the fact that it all played in Scotland.

Pat Boone was the first star announced. He said he was reluctant to make the film because it was science fiction, even after Fox promised to add some songs. It was only when they offered him 15% of the profits that he agreed at the urging of his management. He said, "Later on, I was very glad I did it, because it was fun to do, it had some good music and it became a very successful film".

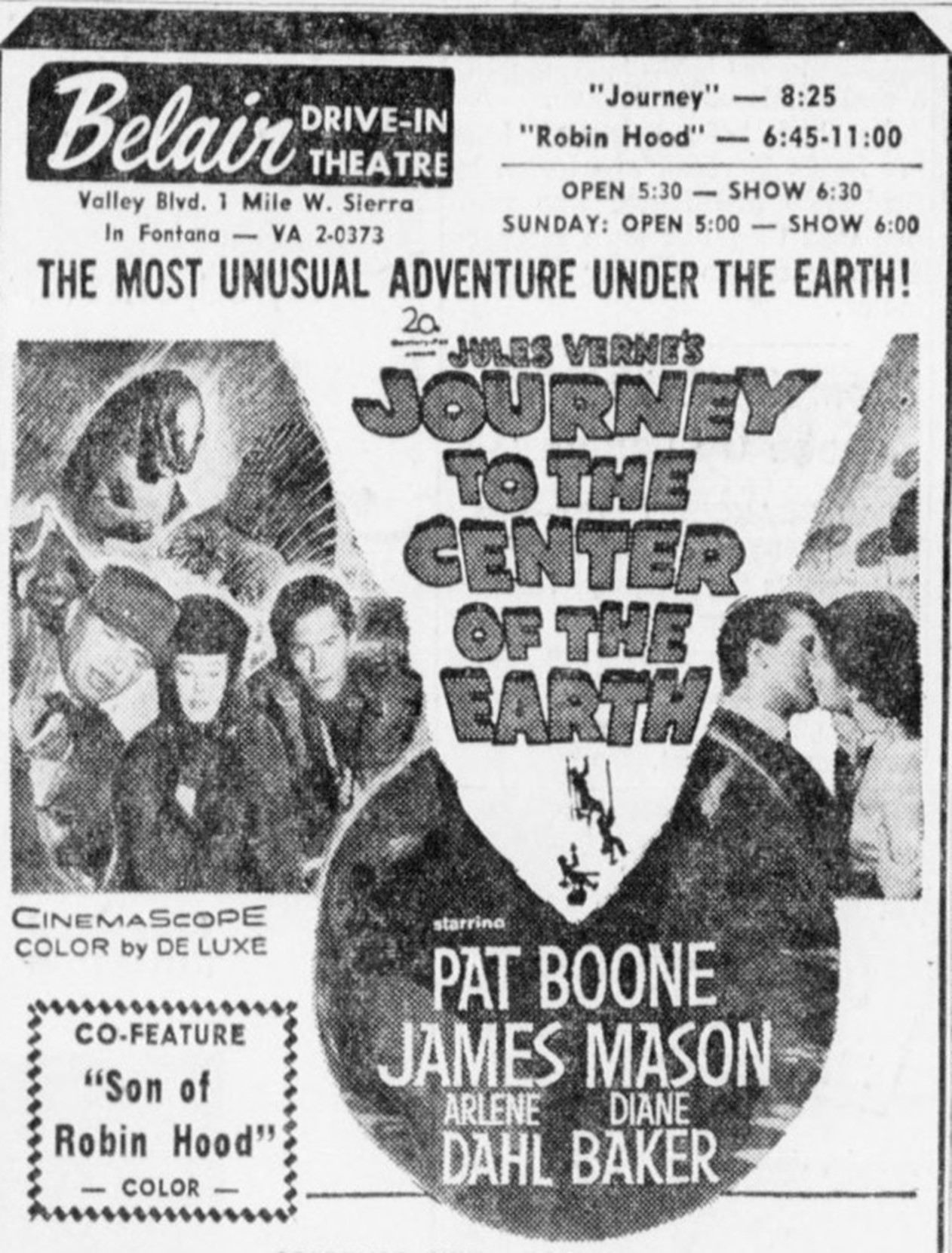
Drive-in advertisement from 1960

Following up on that point, Diabolique magazine later observed:

It remains a mystery why Boone never appeared in another fantasy/sci-fi adventure in his entire career. Boone was believable in them, and he could easily sing a song over the credits if he wanted. He wouldn’t have to worry about kissing any of his co-stars or “morality” issues. And it wasn’t as though Fox weren’t making them. When he was under contract they turned out The Lost World (1960), Voyage to the Bottom of the Sea (1961) and Five Weeks in a Balloon (1962). The last two even featured pop stars Frankie Avalon and Fabian respectively, but no Boone. Was he too expensive? Did the dates not work out? Did he insist on playing the lead? Whatever the reason it was a great shame. For me, this is the biggest misstep Boone made in his film career.

The role of the professor was meant to be played by Clifton Webb. Reisch said:

That was absolutely the most beautiful idea, because Clifton Webb had a certain tongue-in-cheek style, suited to playing a professor with crazy notions, which could be paired with Pat Boone as his favorite disciple. Every week Clifton visited Brackett's office, where we described scenes to him and he became very excited at the prospect of playing that kind of part. Maybe two or three weeks before we actually began to shoot, Clifton Webb went to the hospital for a checkup, and they never let him out. He had to undergo major surgery. Unless my memory fails me completely, it was a double hernia, and he was, as you can imagine, a very sensitive man, very touchy about sickness. He called Zanuck himself on his private line, and said he could not play the part because it was such a physical part.

Webb was replaced at the last minute by James Mason, who had previously appeared as Captain Nemo in Disney's earlier adaptation of Jules Verne's novel, 20,000 Leagues Under the Sea (1954). Reisch:

I think it was [longtime head of Twentieth Century-Fox casting] Billy Gordon or Lew Schreiber [Twentieth Century-Fox production executive] who suggested James Mason. James Mason was, of course, British, with a beautiful voice, and he liked the idea [of the part]. He felt it was his duty as Clifton's colleague to take over. From there on it was clear sailing, except that Pat Boone had about three or four songs, if not more, and I think all of them died in the end, with the exception of one or two. The moment that Zanuck saw [their effect on] the action, those songs just fell by the wayside.

Some of the underground sequences for Journey to the Center of the Earth were filmed at Carlsbad Caverns National Park. Other shooting locations included Amboy Crater and Sequit Point, California, as well as Edinburgh, Scotland. Principal photography took place from late June to mid-September 1959.

Originally, Life magazine editor and science writer Lincoln Barnett was to write the screenplay and later acted as one of the technical advisers on the film.

The giant Dimetrodon depicted at the center of the Earth action sequence were actually rhinoceros iguanas with a large, glued-on make-up appliance added to their back. The giant chameleon seen later in the ruins of Atlantis scene was actually a painted Tegu lizard or a monitor lizard.

Boone recalled filming the dramatic whirlpool sea scene:

James Mason, Arlene Dahl, Peter Ronson and I were on a raft, caught in a giant whirlpool. It was a tricky thing to shoot — the raft was on a revolving platform that tilted when it went around. It had to look like we were being tossed violently. Hundreds of gallons of water were being dumped on us to simulate a stormy sea. The noise was deafening, but not enough to drown out Dahl, who started screaming as she held on for dear life. She screamed at the director, Henry Levin, 'Get me off this thing. Get me down. I'm going to pass out!' She kept yelling. Mason had little patience for it. He thought Dahl had already overplayed the role of a dainty creature when we had to wear very heavy parkas, feigning winter amid very hot July weather, for another scene (Dahl complained then of heat prostration). Mason was not amused as this time he yelled back at her, 'Shut up woman! We're going to have to do this ten times if you don't keep quiet.' We were going to have to dub dialogue anyway, and they got the shot.

Dahl became unconscious and it took 30 minutes to revive her.

== Reception ==
=== Box office ===
At the time of release, Journey to the Center of the Earth was a financial success, grossing $10,000,000 at the box office (well over its $3.44 million budget).

=== Critical response ===
Film review aggregator website Rotten Tomatoes assigns a rating of 84% based on 31 critics, with an average rating of 6.9/10. The website's critical consensus describes Journey to the Center of the Earth as "a silly but fun movie with everything you'd want from a sci-fi blockbuster – heroic characters, menacing villains, monsters, big sets and special effects".

Upon the film's release, New York Times film critic Bosley Crowther said Journey to the Center of the Earth is "really not very striking make-believe, when all is said and done. The earth's interior is somewhat on the order of an elaborate amusement-park tunnel of love. And the attitudes of the people, toward each other and toward another curious man who happens to be exploring down there at the same time, are conventional and just a bit dull".

Ian Nathan, writing a retrospective review for Empire, gave the film four stars, stating that "it has dated a fair bit, but it's a film that takes its far-fetchedness seriously, and delivers a thrilling adventure untrammelled by cheese, melodrama or ludicrous tribes of extras, shabbily dressed bird-beings or lizard men", ultimately concluding that the film is "still captivating despite the obviously dated effects".

=== Accolades ===
Journey to the Center of the Earth won a second place Golden Laurel award for Top Action Drama in 1960.

Academy Award nominations:

- Best Art Direction-Set Decoration: Lyle R. Wheeler, Franz Bachelin, Herman A. Blumenthal, Walter M. Scott and Joseph Kish
- Best Effects, Special Effects: L. B. Abbott (visual), James B. Gordon (visual), Carlton W. Faulkner (audible)
- Best Sound: Carlton W. Faulkner

== Comic book adaptation ==
- Dell Four Color #1060 (November 1959)

== See also ==
- At the Earth's Core (film)
- Journey to the Center of the Earth (TV series)
- Journey to the Center of the Earth (2008 theatrical film)
- Where Time Began
