= Panagiotis Epitropopoulos =

Greek decathlete

Personal information
- Nationality: Greek
- Born: 28 May 1938 (age 86); Piraeus, Greece

Sport
- Sport: Athletics
- Event: Decathlon

Panagiotis Epitropopoulos (born 28 May 1938) is a Greek athlete. He competed in the men's decathlon at the 1960 Summer Olympics.
