= Athletics at the 1959 Pan American Games – Men's javelin throw =

Men's javelin throw at the Pan American Games

The men's javelin throw event at the 1959 Pan American Games was held at the Soldier Field in Chicago on 2 September.

== Results ==
Rank	Name	Nationality	Result	Notes
1st place, gold medalist(s)	Buster Quist	United States	70.50	
2nd place, silver medalist(s)	Phil Conley	United States	69.94	
3rd place, bronze medalist(s)	Al Cantello	United States	69.82	
4	Juris Laipenieks	Chile	59.88	
5	Luis Zárate	Peru	56.25	
6	Brigido Iriarte	Venezuela	53.02	
	Ricardo Héber	Argentina	DNS	
