= Klaus Grogorenz =

German decathlete

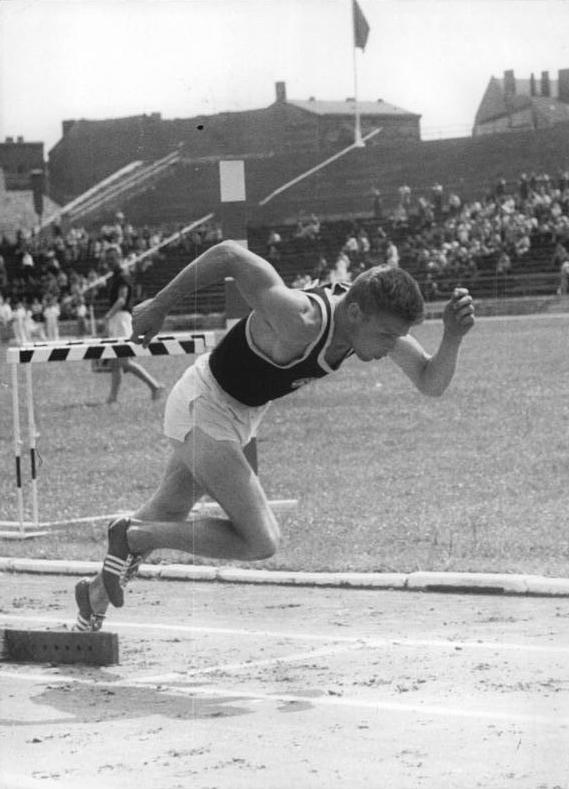
- Klaus Grogorenz in 1957

Personal information
- Nationality: German
- Born: 27 April 1937 (age 87); Wolfen, Germany

Sport
- Sport: Athletics
- Event: Decathlon

Klaus Grogorenz (born 27 April 1937) is a German athlete. He competed in the men's decathlon at the 1960 Summer Olympics.

== Career ==
Grogorenz finished eighth at the 1960 Summer Olympics in Rome.

Domestically, Grogorenz was an East German Champion in the 100 and 200-metre dash in 1957 and was also a runner-up in the decathlon in 1961 and 1963. He also took part in 10 international matches.
