= Elvin C. Drake =

American track and field coach (1903 - 1988)

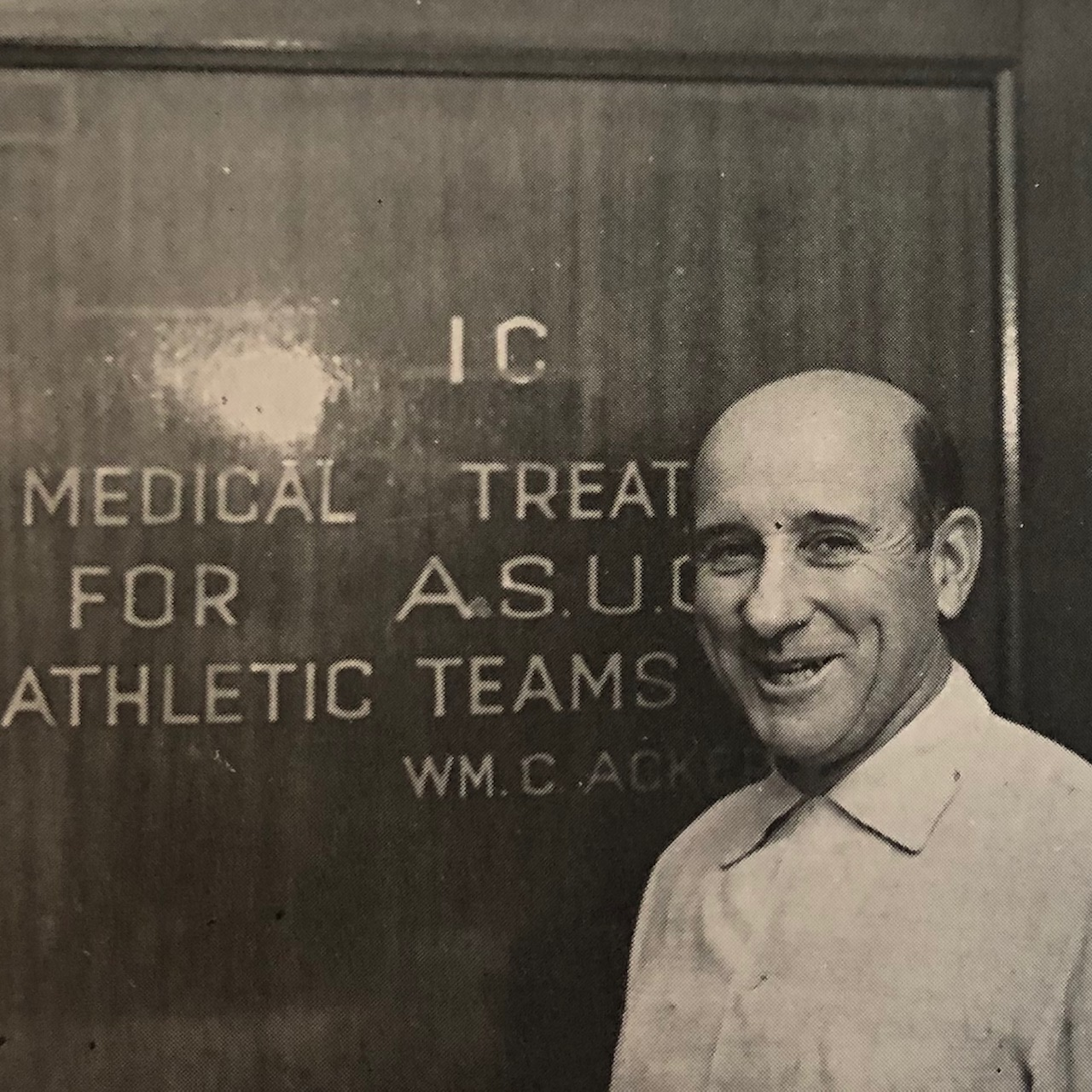
Drake from the 1957 Southern Campus yearbook

Elvin C. "Ducky" Drake (November 2, 1903 – December 23, 1988) was an American track and field coach and athletics trainer at the University of California, Los Angeles (UCLA). During his more than 60-year association with the university, he became a fixture and "father confessor" to many of the athletes he worked with.

Drake was born in Friend, Nebraska, and played high school sports at Fort Morgan, Colorado. He worked in Los Angeles at a lumber yard.

Drake enrolled at UCLA in 1923 and earned three letters in cross country running, while also becoming a member of Sigma Pi fraternity. In 1927, he became the first college graduate in his family.

He was hired as an assistant track coach at his alma mater in 1929. Drake was the head trainer from 1942 to 1972 and the head track and field coach from 1947 to 1964, with a 107–48 record in track meets. Under his leadership, the UCLA Bruins won the 1956 National Collegiate Athletic Association national outdoor title (the school's first track and field title), and he was named NCAA Track & Field Coach of the Year for that year. He coached decathletes Rafer Johnson and C. K. Yang during the 1960 Summer Olympics, in which they won gold and silver, respectively, in one of the tensest duels in Olympic history. Close to legendary UCLA basketball coach John Wooden, he was the trainer for all of Wooden's teams over a span of 27 years.

Drake died of a heart attack at the age of 85 at St. John's Hospital and Health Center in Santa Monica, California. He was survived by his wife Rose. They had no children.

He is a member of the National Track and Field Hall of Fame, the UCLA Athletics Hall of Fame (charter inductee), the U.S. Track & Field and Cross Country Coaches Association Hall of Fame (special inductee), the Mt. SAC Relays Hall of Fame and the National Athletic Trainers' Association Hall of Fame. The UCLA track stadium was renamed Drake Stadium in his honor in 1973. The UCLA basketball Elvin C. "Ducky" Drake Memorial Award for Competitive Spirit, Inspiration and Unselfish Contributions is also named after him.
