= Wu Chun-tsai =

Taiwanese athlete (born 1930)

Personal information
- Nationality: Taiwanese
- Born: 19 April 1930
- Height: 6.2 ft (189 cm)

Sport
- Sport: Athletics
- Event: Triple jump

Wu Chun-tsai (born 19 April 1930) is a Taiwanese athlete. He competed in the men's triple jump at the 1956 Summer Olympics.
