= Seppo Suutari =

Finnish decathlete

Personal information
- Nationality: Finnish
- Born: 28 December 1940 (age 84) Kauhajoki, Finland

Sport
- Sport: Athletics
- Event: Decathlon

Seppo Suutari (born 28 December 1940 in Kauhajoki, Finland) is a Finnish athlete. He competed in the men's decathlon at the 1960 Summer Olympics.
