= Gurbachan Singh Randhawa =

Indian athlete

Gurbachan Singh Randhawa (born 6 June 1939, in Punjab Nangli, Amritsar) is a former Indian athlete who won a gold medal at the 1962 Asian Games in decathlon. He participated in the 1960 and 1964 Olympics in 110 hurdles, high jump and decathlon. He finished fifth in the 110 hurdles at the 1964 Tokyo Olympics with a timing of 14.07 seconds. He was honoured with the Arjuna Award in 1961 thus becoming the first athlete from the country to get the award and with the Padma Shri in 2005. His biography 'Uddna Baaz' is written by Navdeep Singh Gill.

== See also ==
- Athletics in India

Olympic Games
Preceded by Balbir Singh Sr.	Flagbearer for India; Tokyo 1964	Succeeded by D. N. Devine Jones
