= Henk Kamerbeek =

Dutch hammer thrower

Personal information
- Born: 13 September 1893 Zeist, the Netherlands
- Died: 30 November 1954 (aged 61) Eindhoven, the Netherlands

Sport
- Sport: Athletics
- Club: PSV, Eindhoven

Hendrik "Henk" Kamerbeek (13 September 1893 – 30 November 1954) was a Dutch hammer thrower. He competed at the 1924 and 1928 Summer Olympics with the best result of 10th place in 1928. After retiring from competitions, he was chairman of the athletics section of the Philips Sports Club (PSV). His son Eef, also an Olympic athlete, later succeeded him in this function. Henk Kamerbeek died one week after a tragic accident at work.
