= Franco Sar =

Italian decathlete (1933–2018)

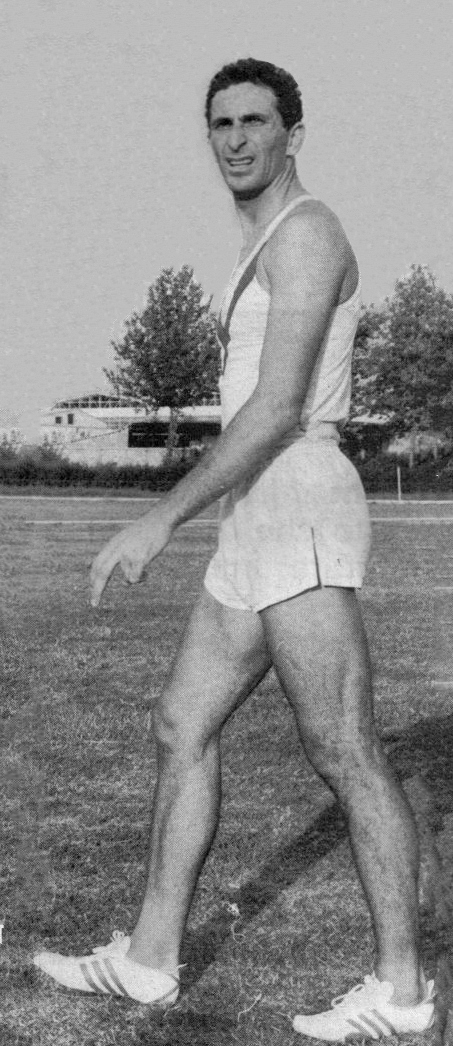

Personal information
- Born: 21 December 1933 Arborea, Italy
- Died: 1 October 2018 (aged 84) Monza, Italy
- Height: 188 cm (6 ft 2 in)
- Weight: 88 kg (194 lb)

Sport
- Sport: Athletics
- Event: Decathlon
- Club: Gruppo Sportivo Monteponi; Lilion Snia

Achievements and titles
- Personal best: Decathlon: 7368 (1965)

Franco Sar (21 December 1933 – 1 October 2018) was an Italian decathlete who held the national title from 1960 to 1965.

== Biography ==
Sar competed at the 1960 and 1964 Summer Olympics and placed sixth and thirteenth, respectively.

== Achievements ==
Year	Competition	Venue	Position	Event	Performance	Notes
1960	Olympic Games	(Italy) Rome	6th	Decathlon	7140 pts	
1964	Olympic Games	(Japan) Tokyo	13th	Decathlon	6888 pts	

== National titles ==
He won 9 national championships at individual senior level.

- Italian Athletics Championships
  - Decathlon: From 1958 to 1965 (8)
  - Pole vault: 1963
