= Yuriy Dyachkov =

Soviet decathlete

Personal information
- Born: 13 July 1940 (age 85) Tbilisi, Georgian SSR, Soviet Union
- Height: 196 cm (6 ft 5 in)
- Weight: 100 kg (220 lb)

Sport
- Sport: Athletics
- Event: Decathlon
- Club: Dynamo Tbilisi

Achievements and titles
- Personal best: 7756 (1968)

Yuriy Borisovich Dyachkov (Russian: Юрий Борисович Дьячков; born 13 July 1940) is a retired Soviet decathlete. He competed at the 1960 Summer Olympics but failed to finish. He placed sixth at the 1962 European Championships and won the national title in 1965 and 1966. Dyachkov is the son of the Olympic discus thrower Nina Dumbadze and athletics coach Boris Dyachkov.
