= José Aceituno =

Chilean long-distance runner

Personal information
- Born: 4 January 1937 (age 89) Valparaíso, Chile
- Died: 16 May 2002 (aged 65)
- Height: 1.67 m (5 ft 6 in)
- Weight: 58 kg (128 lb)

Sport
- Sport: Long-distance running
- Event: 5000 metres

José Florindo Aceituno Fernandes (4 January 1937 – 16 May 2002) was a Chilean long-distance runner. He competed in the men's 5000 metres at the 1960 Summer Olympics.

== International competitions ==
Year	Competition	Venue	Position	Event	Notes
Representing Chile
1960	Olympic Games	Rome, Italy	–	5000 m	DNF
1960	Ibero-American Games	Santiago, Chile	–	10,000 m	NT
