= Hans Muchitsch =

Austrian decathlete (1932–2019)

Personal information
- Nationality: Austrian
- Born: 30 September 1932 Sankt Andrä, Austria
- Died: 10 May 2019 (aged 86)

Sport
- Sport: Athletics
- Event: Decathlon

Hans Muchitsch (30 September 1932 – 10 May 2019) was an Austrian athlete. He competed in the men's decathlon at the 1960 Summer Olympics.
