= Vasili Kuznetsov (decathlete) =

Russian decathlete

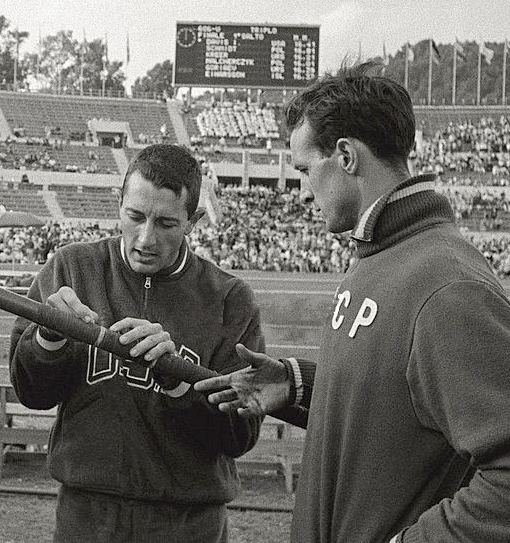
- Phil Mulkey and Vasili Kuznetsov at the 1960 Olympics

Personal information
- Born: 7 February 1932 Kalikino, Ryazan Oblast, Russian SFSR, Soviet Union
- Died: 6 August 2001 (aged 69) Moscow, Russia
- Height: 185 cm (6 ft 1 in)
- Weight: 83 kg (183 lb)

Sport
- Sport: Athletics
- Event: Decathlon
- Club: Burevestnik Moscow
Medal record
Men's athletics
Representing Soviet Union
Olympic Games
Bronze medal – third place	1956 Melbourne	Decathlon
Bronze medal – third place	1960 Rome	Decathlon
European Championships
Gold medal – first place	1954 Bern	Decathlon
Gold medal – first place	1958 Stockholm	Decathlon
Gold medal – first place	1962 Belgrade	Decathlon
Universiade
Gold medal – first place	1959 Turin	Pentathlon
Gold medal – first place	1961 Sofia	Decathlon

Vasili Dmitriyevich Kuznetsov (Russian: Василий Дмитриевич Кузнецов, 7 February 1932 – 6 August 2001) was a Soviet and Russian decathlete who won the European title in 1954, 1958 and 1962. He competed for the Soviet Union at the 1956, 1960 and 1964 Olympics and won bronze medals in 1956 and 1960, placing seventh in 1964.

Kuznetsov took up athletics in the late 1940s and won a record 10 national decathlon titles in 1953–60 and 1962–63. He set two decathlon world records: in May 1958, he was the first athlete to break the 8,000 points barrier on the 1952 scoring system, with 8,014 points (7,653 (1985)) in Krasnodar. He set his second world record in May 1959 at 8,357 (7,839 (1985)). He also held three pentathlon world records at 3,736 in 1956, 3,901 in 1958, and 4,006 in 1959. Kuznetsov retired after the 1964 Olympics to become an athletics coach and lecturer at the Moscow State University. In 1987 he was included into the list of 10 all-time best decathletes by the IAAF.

Records
Preceded by (United States) Rafer Johnson	Men's decathlon world record holder 18 May 1958 – 28 July 1958	Succeeded by (United States) Rafer Johnson
Preceded by (United States) Rafer Johnson	Men's decathlon world record holder 17 May 1959 – 9 July 1960	Succeeded by (United States) Rafer Johnson
