= Mirko Kolnik =

Slovenian decathlete

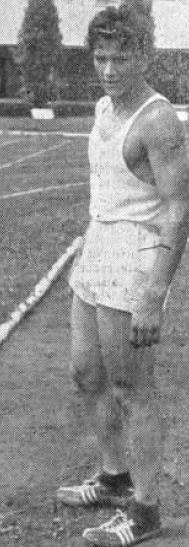

Personal information
- Nationality: Slovenian
- Born: 9 July 1936 (age 88); Ljubljana, Yugoslavia

Sport
- Sport: Athletics
- Event: Decathlon

Mirko Kolnik (born 9 July 1936) is a Slovenian athlete. He competed in the men's decathlon at the 1960 Summer Olympics, representing Yugoslavia.
