= Juris Laipenieks =

Chilean decathlete

Personal information
- Born: 9 April 1940 (age 86) Riga, Latvia
- Height: 1.84 m (6 ft 0 in)
- Weight: 80 kg (176 lb)

Sport
- Country: Chile
- Sport: Athletics
- Event(s): Decathlon, javelin throw
Medal record
Men's Athletics
Representing Chile
Ibero-American Games
Bronze medal – third place	1960 Santiago	Decathlon

Juris Laipenieks (born 9 April 1940) is a retired Chilean athlete. He competed in the men's decathlon at the 1960 Summer Olympics.

== International competitions ==
Year	Competition	Venue	Position	Event	Notes
Representing Chile
1957	South American Championships (unofficial)	Santiago, Chile	3rd	Javelin throw (old)	61.10 m
1958	South American Championships in Athletics	Montevideo, Uruguay	10th	Discus throw	36.31 m
1959	South American Championships (unofficial)	São Paulo, Brazil	6th	Shot put	13.19 m
1959	South American Championships (unofficial)	São Paulo, Brazil	4th	Javelin throw	54.76 m
1959	South American Championships (unofficial)	São Paulo, Brazil	1st	Decathlon	5658 pts
1959	Pan American Games	Chicago, United States	4th	Javelin throw (old)	59.88 m
1959	Pan American Games	Chicago, United States	6th	Decathlon	5472 pts
1960	Olympic Games	Rome, Italy	19th	Decathlon	5865 pts
1960	Ibero-American Games	Santiago, Chile	10th	Javelin throw (old)	58.53 m
1960	Ibero-American Games	Santiago, Chile	3rd	Decathlon	6081 pts
1962	Ibero-American Games	Madrid, Spain	7th	Decathlon	4558 pts

== Personal bests ==
- Javelin throw – 61.30 m (1960)
- Decathlon – 6468 pts (1960)
