= Manfred Bock =

German decathlete

Medal record

Men's athletics

Representing West Germany

European Championships
Bronze medal – third place	1962 Belgrade	Decathlon

Manfred Bock (28 May 1941 – 31 October 2010) was a German track and field athlete who started for West Germany at the European Championship of 1962 and received the bronze medal in the Decathlon. He was born in Hamburg. In the 1960 Olympic Games, he took 10th place.

Manfred Bock was a member of the Hamburg SV. During his racing career Bock stood 1.90 m (6 ft 3 in) high and weighed 90 kg (200 lb). Bock died in October 2010 in Uetersen.

== Tables ==
- 1960 Olympic Games: (6894 points, 7006 points on the 1985 table: 11.4 s - 6.79 m - 12.03 m - 1.85 m - 50.5 s - 16.1 s - 37.69 s - 3.90 m - 63.63 m - 4:27.6 min)
- 1962 European Championship: (7835 points, 7565 on the 1985 table: 10.8 s - 6.96 m - 13.25 m - 1.86 m - 48.6 s - 14.7 s - 39.47 m - 3.90 m - 62.85 m - 4:22.9 min)
