= Herman Timme =

Dutch decathlete (1933–2022)

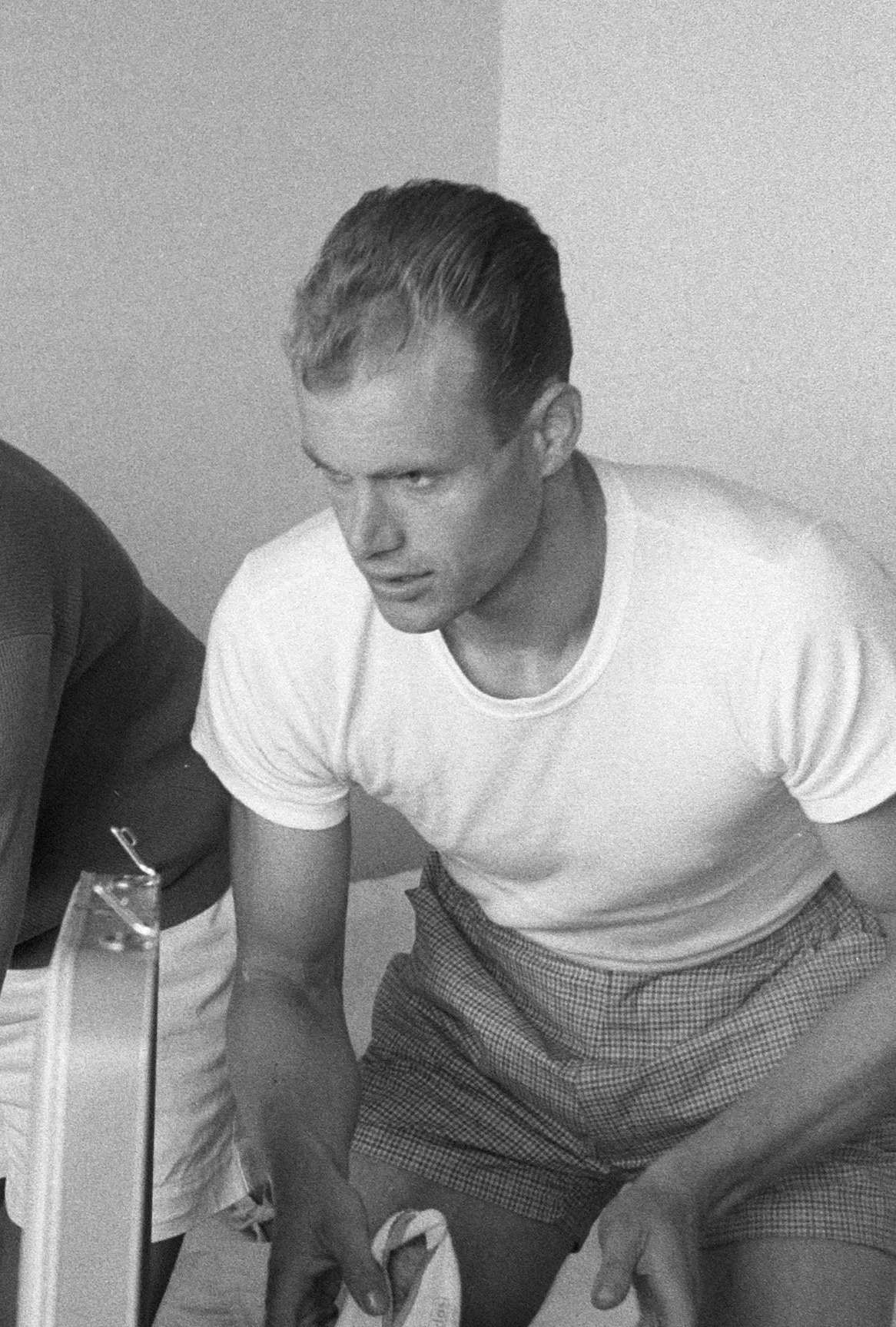
- Timme at the 1960 Olympics

Personal information
- Born: 21 July 1933 Rotterdam, the Netherlands
- Died: 19 December 2022 (aged 89) Maastricht, the Netherlands
- Height: 1.89 m (6 ft 2 in)
- Weight: 86 kg (190 lb)

Sport
- Sport: Athletics
- Club: Kimbria, Maastricht

Herman Johannes Timme (21 July 1933 – 19 December 2022) was a Dutch decathlete. He competed at the 1960 Summer Olympics and finished in 15th place. Between 1957 and 1967, he won more than 20 medals at national championships, but never a national title. He retired from competitions in 1970.

Timme died on 19 December 2022, at the age of 89.
