= Markus Kahma =

Finnish decathlete

Personal information
- Nationality: Finnish
- Born: 16 October 1932 (age 93) Alavieska, Finland

Sport
- Sport: Athletics
- Event: Decathlon

Markus Kahma (born 16 October 1932) is a Finnish athlete. He competed in the men's decathlon at the 1960 Summer Olympics.
