= Yuriy Kutenko =

Ukrainian decathlete

Personal information
- Born: 8 July 1932 Fastiv, Kyiv Oblast, Ukrainian SSR
- Died: 13 December 2003 (aged 71) Lviv, Ukraine
- Height: 187 cm (6 ft 2 in)
- Weight: 90 kg (198 lb)

Sport
- Sport: Athletics
- Event: Decathlon
- Coached by: Dmitry Obbarius

Yuriy Kostiantynovych Kutenko (Ukrainian: Юрій Костянтинович Кутенко, 8 July 1932 – 13 December 2003) was a Ukrainian decathlete. He competed at the 1956 and 1960 Summer Olympics and placed fourth in 1960; he also finished fourth at the 1954 European Championships. Kutenko was seriously injured during a 1963 Soviet-American meetup in San Francisco, breaking several ribs and spending 40 days in a hospital. The accident left him with a failed kidney and forced him to retire. He later had a two-decade-long career as an athletics coach with the Soviet Army Sports Club.
