= Rafer Johnson =

American decathlete and actor (1934–2020)

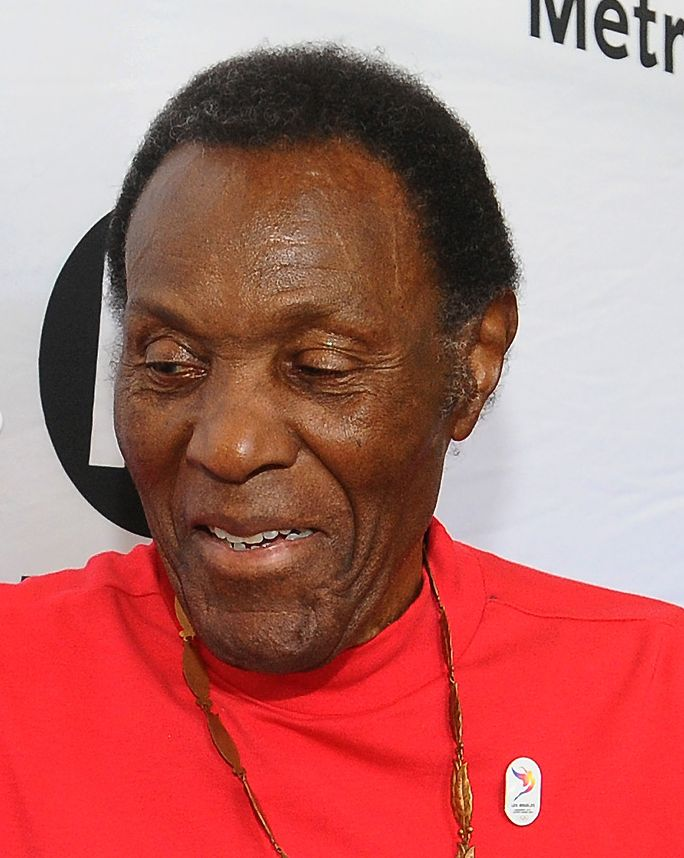
- Johnson in 2016

Personal information
- Full name: Rafer Lewis Johnson
- Born: August 18, 1934 Hillsboro, Texas, U.S.
- Died: December 2, 2020 (aged 86) Sherman Oaks, California, U.S.
- Height: 6 ft 3 in (1.90 m)
- Weight: 201 lb (91 kg)
- Spouse: Elizabeth Thorsen (m. 1971)

Sport
- Sport: Athletics
- Event: Decathlon
- Club: Southern California Striders, Anaheim

Achievements and titles
- Personal bests: 100 m – 10.3 (1957); 220 yd – 21.0 (1956); 400 m – 47.9 (1956); 110 mH – 13.8 (1956); HJ – 1.89 m (1955); PV – 4.09 m (1960); LJ – 7.76 m (1956); SP – 16.75 m (1958); DT – 52.50 m (1960); JT – 76.73 m (1960); Decathlon – 8392 (1960)
Medal record
Representing United States
Olympic Games
Gold medal – first place	1960 Rome	Decathlon
Silver medal – second place	1956 Melbourne	Decathlon
Pan American Games
Gold medal – first place	1955 Mexico City	Decathlon

Rafer Lewis Johnson (August 18, 1934 – December 2, 2020) was an American decathlete and film and television actor. He was the 1960 Olympic gold medalist in the decathlon, having won silver in 1956. He had previously won a gold at the 1955 Pan American Games. Johnson was the U.S. team's flag bearer at the 1960 Olympics and lit the Olympic cauldron at the 1984 Summer Olympics.

In 1968, Johnson, football player Rosey Grier, and journalist George Plimpton tackled Sirhan Sirhan moments after he had fatally shot Robert F. Kennedy.

After he retired from athletics, Johnson turned to acting, sportscasting, and public service and was instrumental in creating the California Special Olympics. His acting career included appearances in The Sins of Rachel Cade (1961), the Elvis Presley film Wild in the Country (1961), Pirates of Tortuga (1961), None but the Brave (1965), two Tarzan films with Mike Henry, The Last Grenade (1970), Soul Soldier (1970), Roots: The Next Generations (1979), the James Bond film Licence to Kill (1989), and Think Big (1990).

== Biography ==
Johnson was born in Hillsboro, Texas, on August 18, 1934. (Note: Some sources give his birth year as 1935, but his family has stated that is incorrect.) His family moved to Kingsburg, California, when he was aged nine. For a while, they were the only black family in the town. A versatile athlete, he played on Kingsburg High School's soccer, baseball and basketball teams. He was also elected class president in both junior high and high school. The summer between his sophomore and junior years in high school (age 16), his coach Murl Dodson drove Johnson 24 miles (40 km) to Tulare and watched Bob Mathias compete in the 1952 U.S. Olympic decathlon trials. Johnson told his coach, "I could have beaten most of those guys." Dodson and Johnson drove back a month later to watch Mathias's victory parade. Weeks later, Johnson competed in a high school invitational decathlon and won the event. He also won the 1953 and 1954 California state high school decathlon meets.

In 1954, as a freshman at the University of California, Los Angeles (UCLA), his progress in the event was impressive; he broke the world record in his fourth competition. He pledged Pi Lambda Phi fraternity, America's first non-sectarian fraternity, and was class president at UCLA. In 1955, in Mexico City, he won the title at the Pan American Games.

Johnson qualified for both the decathlon and the long jump events for the 1956 Summer Olympics in Melbourne. However, he was hampered by an injury and forfeited his place in the long jump. Despite this handicap, he managed win silver in the decathlon behind compatriot Milt Campbell. It would turn out to be his last defeat in the event.

Due to injury, Johnson missed the 1957 and 1959 seasons (the latter due to a car accident), but he broke the world record in 1958 and again in 1960. The crown to his career came at the 1960 Summer Olympics in Rome. His most serious rival was Yang Chuan-Kwang (C. K. Yang) of Taiwan. Yang also studied at UCLA; the two trained together under UCLA track coach Elvin C. "Ducky" Drake and had become friends. In the decathlon, the lead swung back and forth between them. Finally, after nine events, Johnson led Yang by a small margin, but Yang was known to be better in the final event, the 1500 m. According to The Telegraph (UK), "legend has it" that Drake gave coaching to both men, with him advising Johnson to stay close to Yang and be ready for "a hellish sprint" at the end, and advising Yang to put as much distance between himself and Johnson before the final sprint as possible.

Johnson ran his personal best at 4:49.7 and finished just 1.2 sec slower than Yang, winning the gold by 58 points with an Olympic record total of 8,392 points. Both athletes were exhausted and drained and came to a stop a few paces past the finish line leaning against each other for support. With this victory, Johnson ended his athletic career.

At UCLA, Johnson also played basketball under legendary coach John Wooden and was a starter for the Bruins on their 1958–59 team. Wooden considered Johnson a great defensive player, but sometimes regretted holding back his teams early in his coaching career, remarking, "imagine Rafer Johnson on the [fast] break."

Johnson was selected by the Los Angeles Rams in the 28th round (333rd overall) of the 1959 NFL draft as a running back. Johnson was also selected as a guard by the Los Angeles Jets as one of their two territorial selections in the inaugural 1961 ABL draft alongside Gary Phillips. However, he would never play for either Los Angeles based team or in either professional sports league.

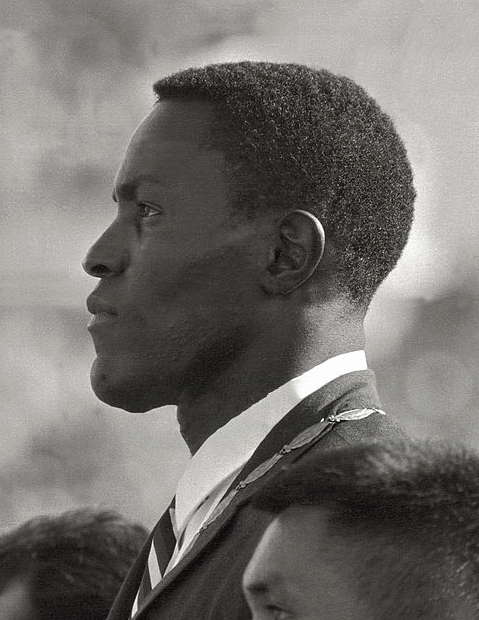
Johnson at the 1960 Summer Olympics

While training for the 1960 Olympics, his friend Kirk Douglas told him about a part in Spartacus that Douglas thought might make him a star: the Ethiopian gladiator Draba, who refuses to kill Spartacus (played by Douglas) after defeating him in a duel. Johnson read for and got the role, but was forced to turn it down because the Amateur Athletic Union told him it would make him a professional and therefore ineligible for the Olympics under the rules of the time. The role eventually went to another UCLA great, Woody Strode. In 1960, Johnson began acting in motion pictures and working as a sportscaster. He made several film appearances, mostly in the 1960s. Johnson worked full-time as a sportscaster in the early 1970s. He was a weekend sports anchor on the local NBC affiliate in Los Angeles, KNBC, but seemed uncomfortable in that position and eventually moved on to other things.

Johnson worked on the presidential election campaign of United States Senator Robert F. Kennedy, and on June 5, 1968, with the help of Rosey Grier and George Plimpton, he apprehended Sirhan Sirhan immediately after Sirhan had assassinated Kennedy at the Ambassador Hotel in Los Angeles, California. Kennedy died the following day at Good Samaritan Hospital. Johnson discussed the experience in his autobiography, The Best That I Can Be (published in 1999 by Galilee Trade Publishing and co-authored with Philip Goldberg).

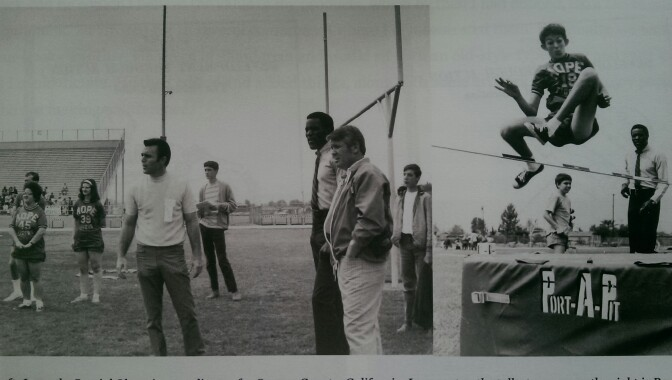
Johnson at the 1972 Special Olympics

Johnson served on the organizing committee for the first Special Olympics competition in Chicago in 1968, hosted by Special Olympics founder, Eunice Kennedy Shriver and the next year he led the founding of the California Special Olympics. Johnson, along with a small group of volunteers, founded California Special Olympics in 1969 by conducting a competition at the Los Angeles Memorial Coliseum for 900 individuals with intellectual disabilities. Following the first California Games in 1969, Johnson became one of the original members of the board of directors. The board worked together to raise funds and offer a modest program of swimming and track and field. In 1983, Rafer ran for President of the Board to increase Board participation, reorganize the staff to most effectively use each person's talents, and expand fundraising efforts. He was elected president and served in the capacity until 1992, when he was named chairman of the Board of Governors.

=== Family ===
Johnson married Elizabeth Thorsen in 1971. They had two children and four grandchildren.

Johnson's brother Jimmy was a member of the Pro Football Hall of Fame and his daughter Jennifer competed in beach volleyball at the 2000 Olympic Games in Sydney following her collegiate career at UCLA. His son Joshua Johnson followed his father into track and field and had a podium finish in the javelin throw at the USA Outdoor Track and Field Championships.

Johnson participated in the Art of the Olympians program.

=== Death ===
Rafer Johnson died after suffering a stroke on December 2, 2020, in Sherman Oaks, California. He was 86.

== Achievements ==
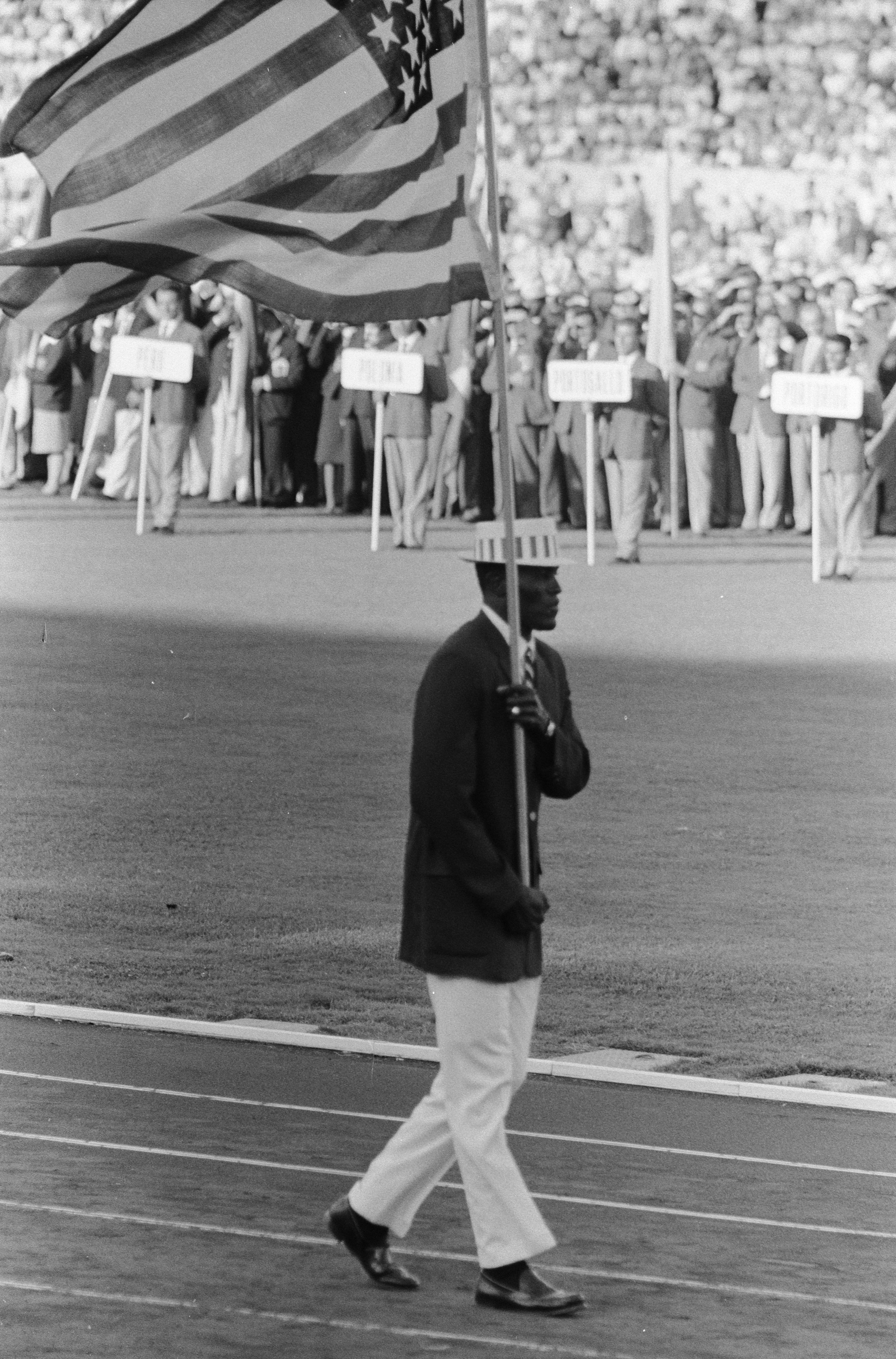
Johnson at the 1960 Summer Olympics in Rome

Johnson was named Sports Illustrated's Sportsman of the Year in 1958 and won the James E. Sullivan Award as the top amateur athlete in the United States in 1960, breaking that award's color barrier. In 1962, he received the Golden Plate Award of the American Academy of Achievement. He was chosen to ignite the Olympic Flame during the opening ceremonies of the 1984 Summer Olympics in Los Angeles, becoming the first Black athlete in Olympic history to do so. In 1990, he was inducted into the National High School Hall of Fame. In 1994, he was elected into the World Sports Humanitarian Hall of Fame as part of its inaugural class.

In 1998, Johnson was named one of ESPN's 100 Greatest North American Athletes of the 20th Century. In 2006, the NCAA named him one of the 100 Most Influential Student Athletes of the past 100 years. On August 25, 2009, Governor Schwarzenegger and Maria Shriver announced that Johnson would be one of 13 California Hall of Fame inductees in The California Museum's yearlong exhibit. The induction ceremony was on December 1, 2009, in Sacramento, California. Johnson was a member of The Pigskin Club of Washington, D.C. National Intercollegiate All-American Football Players Honor Roll.

Rafer Johnson Junior High School in Kingsburg, California is named in his honor, as are Rafer Johnson Community Day School and Rafer Johnson Children's Center, both in Bakersfield, California. The latter school, which has classes for special education students from the ages of birth-5, also puts on an annual Rafer Johnson Day. Every year Johnson himself spoke at the event and cheered on hundreds of students with special needs as they participated in a variety of track and field events.

In 2010, Johnson received the Fernando Award for Civic Accomplishment from the Fernando Foundation and in 2011, he was inducted into the Bakersfield City School District Hall of Fame. Additionally, Rafer acted as the athletic advisor to Dan Guerrero, Director of Athletics at UCLA. He was Inducted into the Texas Track and Field Coaches Hall of Fame, Class of 2016.

In November 2014, Johnson received the Athletes in Excellence Award from The Foundation for Global Sports Development, in recognition of his community service efforts and work with youth.

In 2005, Johnson was awarded an honorary Doctor of Humane Letters (L.H.D.) degree from Whittier College.

== Filmography ==
=== Actor ===
- The Sins of Rachel Cade (1960) – Kosongo
- Sergeant Rutledge (1960) – uncredited
- Wild in the Country (1961) – Davis
- Pirates of Tortuga (1961) – John Gammel
- The Alfred Hitchcock Hour (1963) (Season 2 Episode 8: "The Cadaver") – Ed Blair
- None but the Brave (1965) – Private Johnson
- Daniel Boone (1965) (Season 2 Episode 4: "My Name Is Rawls") – Rawls
- Tarzan and the Great River (1967) – Barcuma, Afro-Brazilian leader of the Jaguar Cult
- Tarzan and the Jungle Boy (1968) – Nagambi, villain who hinders Tarzan's search for the Jungle Boy
- The Last Grenade (1970) – Joe Jackson
- Soul Soldier (1970) – Private Armstrong
- The Games (1970) – Commentator
- Mission Impossible (1971) – Jack Tully
- Roots: The Next Generations (1979)
- Licence to Kill (1989) – Mullens
- Think Big (1990) – Johnson

=== Production roles ===
- Billie (1965) – Technical advisor
- The Black Six (1973) – Associate producer

== Notes ==
Olympic Games
Preceded by Don McDermott	Flagbearer for United States; Rome 1960	Succeeded by Bill Disney
Preceded by Sanda Dubravčić	Final Olympic torchbearer Los Angeles 1984	Succeeded by Robyn Perry
Preceded by Sergei Belov	Final Summer Olympic torchbearer Los Angeles 1984	Succeeded by Chung Sun-Man, Sohn Mi-Chung and Kim Won-Tak
Preceded by (West Germany) Martin Lauer	Track & Field Athlete of the Year; 1960	Succeeded by (United States) Ralph Boston
Records
Preceded by (United States) Bob Mathias	Men's decathlon world record holder June 11, 1955 – May 18, 1958	Succeeded by (Soviet Union) Vasili Kuznetsov
Preceded by (Soviet Union) Vasili Kuznetsov	Men's decathlon world record holder July 28, 1958 – May 17, 1959	Succeeded by (Soviet Union) Vasili Kuznetsov
Preceded by (Soviet Union) Vasili Kuznetsov	Men's decathlon world record holder July 9, 1960 – April 28, 1963	Succeeded by (Chinese Taipei) Yang Chuan-Kwang
