= Yang Chuan-kwang =

Taiwanese decathlete (1933–2007)

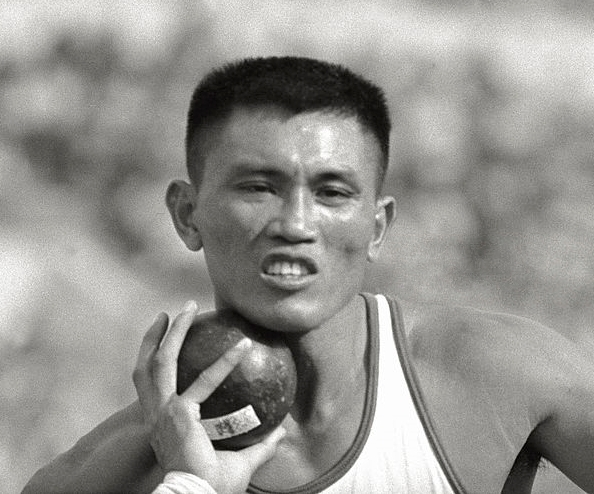
- CK Yang at the 1960 Olympics

Personal information
- Born: July 10, 1933 Taitung County, Japanese Taiwan
- Died: January 27, 2007 (aged 73) Los Angeles, California, US
- Height: 186 cm (6 ft 1 in)
- Weight: 80 kg (176 lb)

Sport
- Sport: Athletics
- Event: Decathlon

Achievements and titles
- Personal bests: HJ – 2.02 m (1956); PV – 5.00 m (1963); Decathlon – 8089/(9121) (1963)
Medal record
Representing Republic of China
Olympic Games
Silver medal – second place	1960 Rome	Decathlon
Asian Games
Gold medal – first place	1954 Manila	Decathlon
Gold medal – first place	1958 Tokyo	Decathlon
Silver medal – second place	1958 Tokyo	110 m hurdles
Silver medal – second place	1958 Tokyo	Long jump
Bronze medal – third place	1958 Tokyo	400 m hurdles

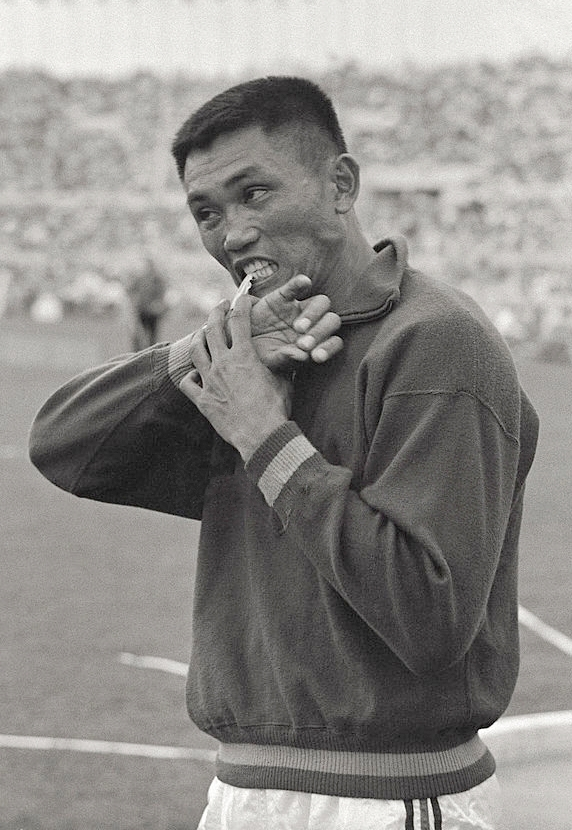
Chuan-kwang at the 1960 Olympics

Yang Chuan-kwang, or C.K. Yang (Amis: Maysang Kalimud, Chinese: 楊傳廣; pinyin: Yáng Chuánguǎng; July 10, 1933 – January 27, 2007), was a Taiwanese Olympian decathlete. Yang attended college at UCLA, where he trained and competed with teammate and Olympian Rafer Johnson and was coached by Elvin C. Drake.

== Early life ==
Yang played baseball at the Taitung Agricultural School and was coached by former Kano baseball team player Chen Keng-yuan in the 1940s.

== Career ==
Known as the "Iron Man of Asia," Yang won the decathlon event at the 1954 and 1958 Asian Games, as well as silver medals in the 110 m hurdles and long jump and the bronze medal in the 400 m hurdles. At the 1956 Summer Olympics he placed eighth in the decathlon. He also competed in the high jump.

Yang's most memorable decathlon competition was a decathlon duel with Rafer Johnson, his friend and teammate at the University of California at Los Angeles, during the 1960 Summer Olympics in Rome. The lead swung back and forth between them. Finally, after nine events, Johnson led Yang by a small margin, but Yang was known to be better in the final event, the 1500m. According to The Telegraph (UK), "legend has it" that Drake gave coaching to both men, with him advising Johnson to stay close to Yang and be ready for "a hellish sprint" at the end, and advising Yang to put as much distance between himself and Johnson before the final sprint as possible. Johnson ran his personal best at 4:49.7 and finished just 1.2 sec slower than Yang, winning the gold by 58 points with an Olympic record total of 8,392 points. Both athletes were exhausted and drained and came to a stop a few paces past the finish line leaning against each other for support. Yang was the first Olympic medallist in his country's history. Yang had confessed to fellow Olympian Chen An-hu before his death that he had purposely slowed down so Johnson, who would eventually be too old to compete, could win the gold medal; Yang won the silver medal. This claim had been contested by historian Lin Bo-wen, noting that Yang had been distracted as he was dating an Italian woman and would go out with her every day his entire duration at Rome.

In 1963, Yang set a world indoor record in the pole vault at 4.96 m (16 ft 3 1/4 in) in Portland, just one day after David Tork had set the record at 4.93 m (16 ft 2 in) in Toronto. His record only lasted a week. Later that year he finally took the decathlon world record from Johnson at the Mt. SAC Relays, coached by William Neufeld. He was the first man to break the 9,000 barrier under the old scale. When the new tables were re-evaluated, this same score was the first to break 8,000 points under the new system. To date, he is the only athlete not from the United States or Europe to hold the decathlon world record.

Yang placed fifth in the decathlon at the 1964 Summer Olympics. Yang attributed his failure to Ma Chen-shan poisoning him with a drink; Ma would defect to China after the event.

He appeared in a number of films, including Walk, Don't Run (1966), as well as the 1970 western There Was a Crooked Man... as a tough inmate named Ah-Ping who did not speak.

== Later career and death ==
Yang served in the Legislative Yuan from 1983 to 1986 as a member of the Kuomintang representing what became the Lowland Aborigine Constituency. As a legislator, he backed additional funding for international sporting competitions. After Yang joined the Democratic Progressive Party, he lost reelection.

After Yang's retirement from athletics, he worked as a trainer and supervisor at the National Sports Training Center in Zuoying, where Ku Chin-shui and Lee Fu-an were trained. After that, Yang converted to Taoism from Christianity, and served as a Taoist priest and a Tangki in a Taoist temple in his native place for 20 years.

Yang was a member of the Amis, one of the sixteen officially recognized peoples of Taiwanese aborigines. He was married to Daisy, a Chinese American, having two sons, Cedric Yang (Yang Sui-yuen) and C.K. Yang Jr., and three grandchildren, Madison Yang, Carmen Yang, and Dorothy Yang. In 2001, while serving as president of the National Sports Training Center at Kaohsiung, Yang was diagnosed with liver cancer. He died on January 27, 2007, from a massive stroke. He is buried at Ivy Lawn Memorial Park in Ventura, California.

== See also ==
- Men's pole vault indoor world record progression
- Decathlon world record progression

Records
Preceded by (United States) Rafer Johnson	Men's Decathlon World Record Holder; April 28, 1963 – July 24, 1966	Succeeded by (United States) Russ Hodge
Awards
Preceded by (New Zealand) Peter Snell	Track & Field Athlete of the Year; 1963	Succeeded by (New Zealand) Peter Snell
