= Luciano Paccagnella =

Italian decathlete

Personal information
- Nationality: Italian
- Born: 18 May 1939 (age 86) Vigodarzere, Italy
- Height: 1.95 m (6 ft 5 in)
- Weight: 85 kg (187 lb)

Sport
- Country: Italy
- Sport: Athletics
- Event: Decathlon

Luciano Paccagnella (18 May 1939) is a former Italian decathlete who competed at the 1960 Summer Olympics,
