= Peter Ronson =

Icelandic athlete & actor (1934–2007)

Peter Ronson (April 22, 1934 – January 16, 2007), born Pétur Rögnvaldsson, was an Icelandic-born athlete and actor.

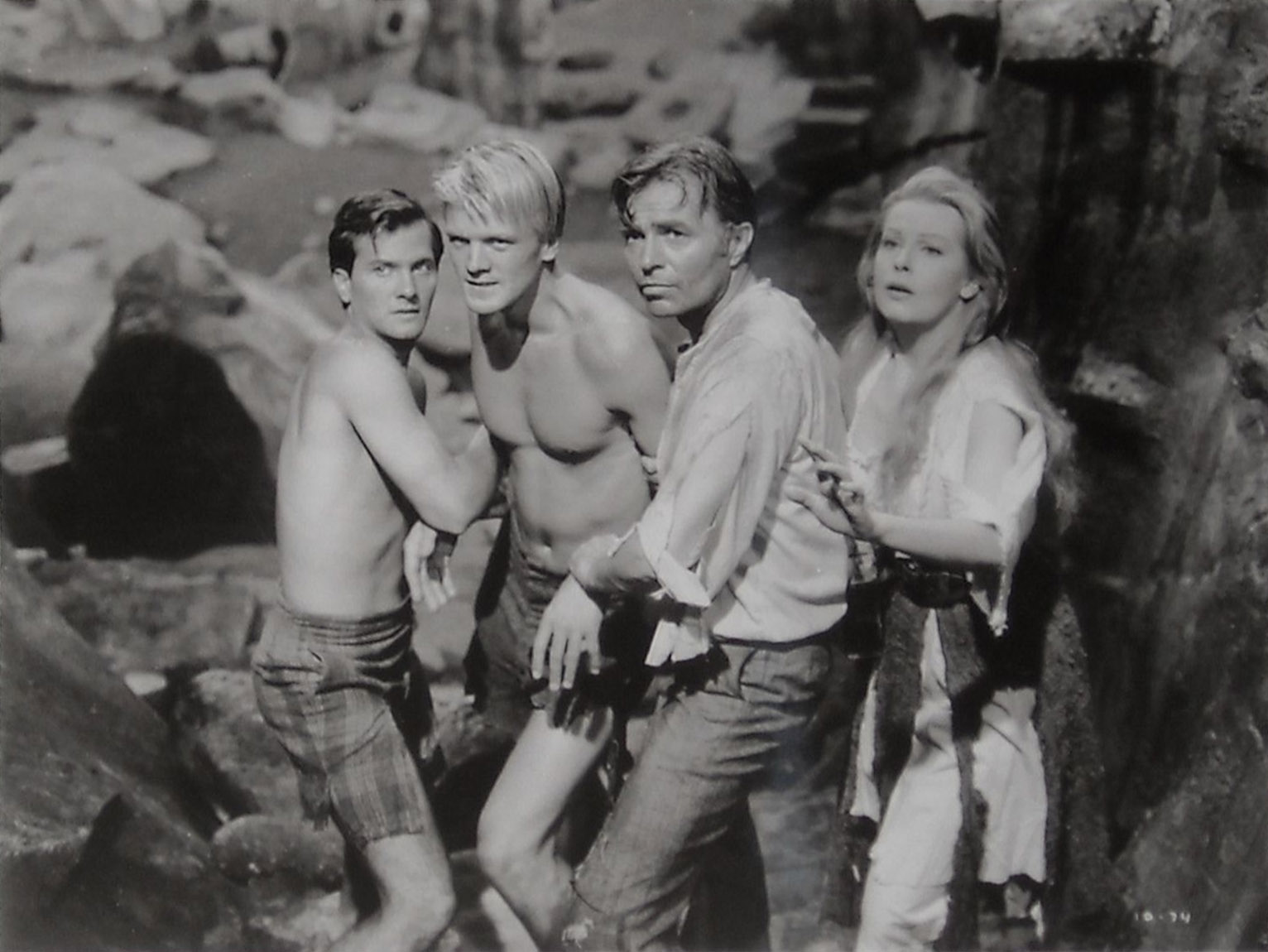
L-R: Pat Boone, Peter Ronson, James Mason, and Arlene Dahl in Journey to the Center of the Earth (1959)

He competed in the 110 metres hurdles at the 1960 Summer Olympics. As an actor, he played Hans Bjelke and was credited as a technical adviser in the 1959 film adaptation of Journey to the Center of the Earth.

He had two sons, Brian and Stephen, with his wife Marie, and three children from a previous relationship, Lisa, Pétur Jr., and Kristine. He died of natural causes in 2007 in Orange County, California.

== Filmography ==
- Journey to the Center of the Earth (1959) - Hans Belker
