= Björgvin Hólm =

Icelandic decathlete

Personal information
- Nationality: Icelandic
- Born: 19 November 1934; Reykjavík, Iceland
- Died: 3 April 1999 (aged 64); Reykjavík, Iceland

Sport
- Sport: Athletics
- Event: Decathlon

Björgvin Hólm (19 November 1934 – 3 April 1999) was an Icelandic athlete. He competed in the men's decathlon at the 1960 Summer Olympics.
