= George Stulac =

Canadian track & field athlete and basketball player

Medal record

Men's Athletics

Representing Canada

Pan American Games
| Bronze medal – third place | 1959 Chicago | Decathlon |

George Stulac (born March 22, 1934, in Toronto, Ontario) is a retired basketball player and track and field athlete from Canada, who represented his native country at three consecutive Summer Olympics (1956, 1960 and 1964). In 1956 and 1964 he was a member of the Canadian Men's National Basketball Team. In 1960 Stulac competed in the men's decathlon competition, having won the bronze medal the previous year at the 1959 Pan American Games.

Stulac was inducted into the Canadian Basketball Hall of Fame in 2015.
