= Léopold Marien =

Belgian decathlete (1934–2018)

Léopold Marien (22 March 1934 – 19 November 2018) was a Belgian decathlete. He competed for his country at the 1960 Summer Olympics in Rome, Italy where he finished 18th in the decathlon. In Tokyo at the 1964 Summer Olympics he competed in the 110 metre hurdles, but was unable to advance from the first round.
