= Jože Brodnik =

Slovenian decathlete

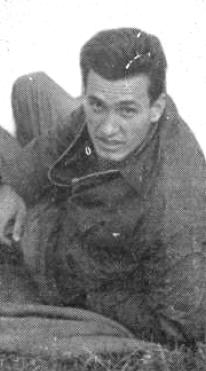
- Jože Brodnik

Personal information
- Nationality: Slovenian
- Born: 26 April 1936 (age 89)

Sport
- Country: Slovenia
- Sport: athletics
- Event: decathlon

Jože Brodnik (born 26 April 1936 in Šmarje pri Jelšah) is a Slovenian retired decathlete who competed in the 1960 Summer Olympics representing Yugoslavia.

He began his athletics career in 1952 at 16, competing for the Kladivar Club in Celje, and went on to become a Slovenian, Yugoslav and Balkan record holder in the decathlon, representing Yugoslavia 11 times. He was a five-time Yugoslav national champion in the decathlon and was also Slovenian champion in the high jump three times, javelin throw and decathlon twice, and 110 metres hurdles, 400 metres hurdles and pole vault once.

Brodnik won the 1959 Mediterranean Games title in Beirut, Lebanon, with 6581 points, at the time a Games record. The following year, Brodnik finished ninth in the decathlon at the 1960 Olympic Games in Rome, scoring 6918 points.

He competed at the European Championships twice, finishing ninth in 1958 and eighth in 1962.

== Personal bests ==
- 100 metres: 11.3h, Belgrade, Serbia, 13 September 1962
- 400 metres: 51.0h, Rome, Italy, 5 September 1960
- 1500 metres: 4:27.4h, Belgrade, Serbia, 14 September 1962
- 110 metres hurdles: 15.4h, Belgrade, Serbia, 14 September 1962
- High Jump: 1.83m, Belgrade, Serbia, 13 September 1962
- Pole Vault: 4.10m, Rome, Italy, 6 September 1960
- Long Jump: 6.91m, Rome, Italy, 5 September 1960
- Shot Put: 13.18m, Stockholm, Sweden, 20 August 1958
- Discus Throw: 39.25m, Belgrade, Serbia, 14 September 1962
- Javelin Throw (old model): 65.30m, Rome, Italy, 6 September 1960
- Decathlon (1962-1984 scoring tables): 7183, Belgrade, Serbia, 14 September 1962

* from the athlete's World Athletics profile

== Post-athletics career ==
Brodnik served as the first director of DARS, the Motorway Company in the Republic of Slovenia (Družba za avtoceste v Republiki Sloveniji), from 1994-1999.

Brodnik served as the president of the Athletics Federation of Slovenia from 1997 to 2001.
