= Walter Meier =

German decathlete (1927–2017)

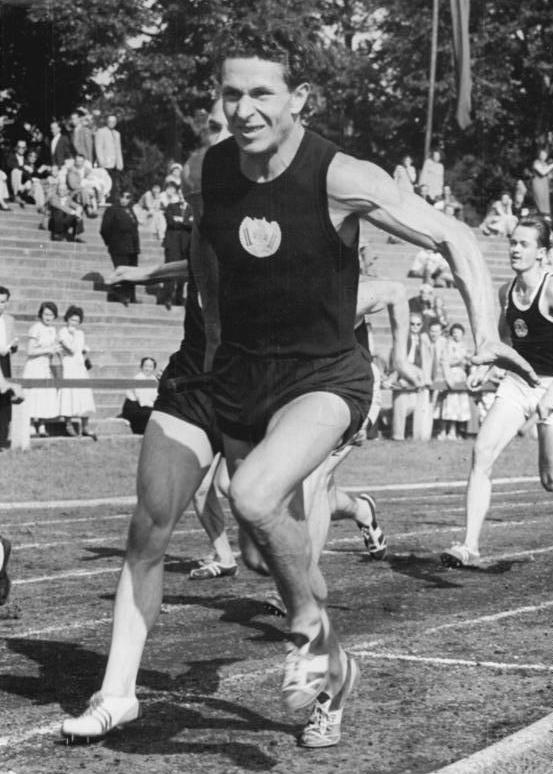
- Walter Meier in 1956

Personal information
- Nationality: German
- Born: 3 August 1927 Rogätz, Germany
- Died: 25 March 2017 (aged 89) Halle an der Saale, Germany

Sport
- Sport: Athletics
- Event: Decathlon

Walter Meier (3 August 1927 – 25 March 2017) was a German athlete. He competed in the men's decathlon at the 1956 Summer Olympics and the 1960 Summer Olympics.
