= Dave Edstrom =

American decathlete (1938–2019)

Personal information
- Born: September 10, 1938 Portland, Oregon
- Died: May 9, 2019 (aged 80) Denver, Colorado
Medal record
Men's Athletics
Representing the United States
Pan American Games
| Gold medal – first place | 1959 Chicago | Decathlon |

David Allan Edstrom (September 10, 1938 – May 9, 2019) was a decathlete from the United States. He won the gold medal in the men's decathlon event at the 1959 Pan American Games in Chicago. He represented his native country at the 1960 Summer Olympics. He competed for Sherwood High School (Oregon), the University of Oregon, the Emerald Empire TC, the Oregon TC, and the US Air Force. He had six children. The Swedish ice hockey player David Edstrom is his grandson.
