= Eef Kamerbeek =

Dutch decathlete

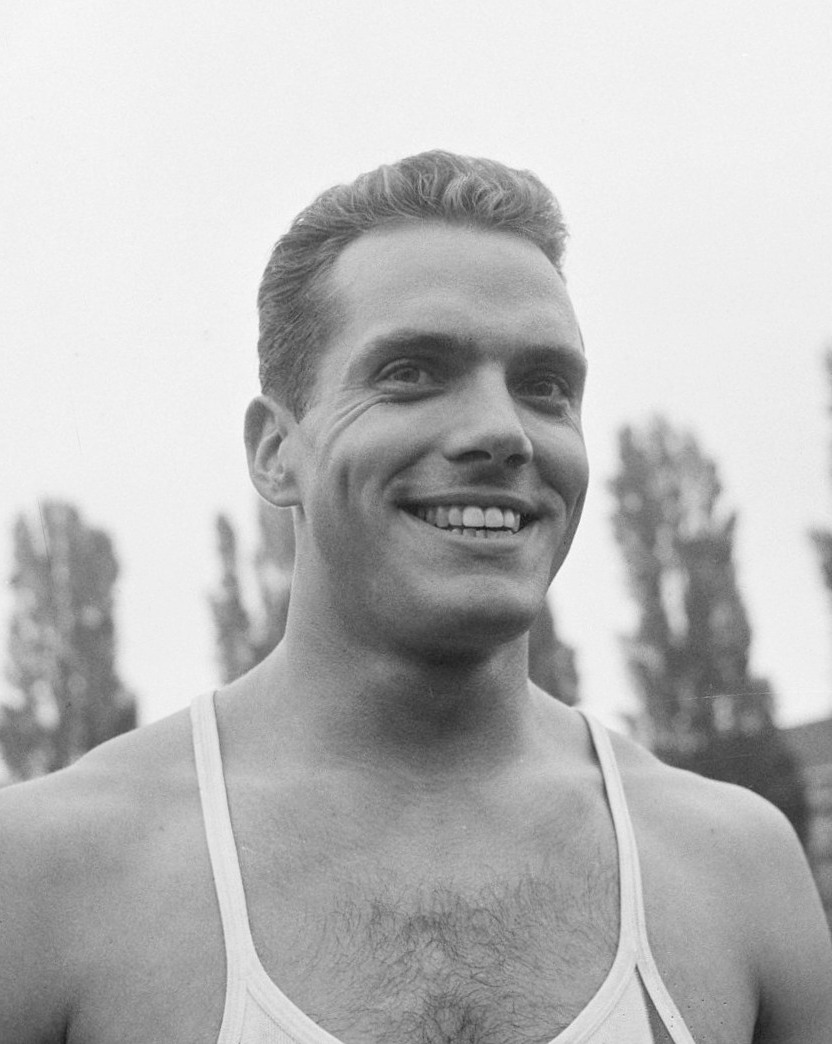
- Eef Kamerbeek in 1961

Personal information
- Born: 17 March 1934 Eindhoven, the Netherlands
- Died: 26 August 2008 (aged 74) Waalre, the Netherlands

Sport
- Sport: Athletics
- Club: PSV, Eindhoven

Evert "Eef" Kamerbeek (17 March 1934 – 26 August 2008) was one of the best Dutch decathletes of all time. Between 1954 and 1964, he won 11 national decathlon titles, as well as seven titles in the 110 m hurdles and four titles in the 200 m hurdles, discus throw and javelin throw; he also occasionally competed in weight lifting. He missed the 1956 Summer Olympics due to their boycott by the Netherlands; at the 1960 Summer Olympics he finished fifth, while he failed to reach the final at the 1964 Games due to a back injury. At European championships, Kamerbeek finished in sixth and fourth place in 1958 and 1962, respectively.

Kamerbeek was selected as the Dutch Sportsman of the year 1960.

His father Henk was an Olympic hammer thrower and chairman of the athletics section of the Philips Sports Club (PSV). After retiring from competitions, Evert worked for Philips in various functions and succeeded his father as chairman of the athletics section of PSV.

Awards
Preceded by Dini Hobers as KNAU Cup	Herman van Leeuwen Cup; 1959, 1960	Succeeded by Cees Koch
