= Athletics at the 1952 Summer Olympics – Men's decathlon =

Men's decathlon at the Games of the XV Olympiad
- Venue: Helsinki Olympic Stadium
- Dates: 25–26 July 1952
- Competitors: 28 from 16 nations
- Winning score: 7,887 WR

Medalists
| 1st place, gold medalist(s) | | Bob Mathias; United States |
| 2nd place, silver medalist(s) | | Milt Campbell; United States |
| 3rd place, bronze medalist(s) | | Floyd Simmons; United States |

The Men's decathlon at the 1952 Summer Olympics took place on 25 and 26 July, at the Helsinki Olympic Stadium. Now 21-year-old Bob Mathias from the United States repeated his performances from the previous games by winning the gold medal and setting new world and Olympic records. It was the second time the United States Olympic team earned all three medals in the event, the first one being in the 1936 Olympic Games.

Mathias ranked first in all three throwing events—discus, shot put and javelin. He won all of these by over a metre.

== Records ==
Prior to this competition, the existing world and Olympic records were as follows:

| World record | (United States) Bob Mathias (USA) | 7287 points | Tulare, United States | 30 June 1950 |
| Olympic record | Glenn Morris (USA) | 7254 points | Berlin, Germany | 8 August 1936 |

At the end of the competition the following world and Olympic records were set:

| Date | Event | Athlete | Points | OR | WR |
|---|---|---|---|---|---|
| 26 July | Final | Bob Mathias (USA) | 7887 | OR | WR |

== Results ==
Note: All scores are based on the tables used in 1952.

=== 100m ===
Heat 1

| Rank | Athlete | Country | Time | Points |
|---|---|---|---|---|
| 1 | Milt Campbell | United States | 10.78 | 1034 |
| 2 | Carlos Vera | Chile | 11.28 | 870 |
| 3 | Vladimir Volkov | Soviet Union | 11.49 | 768 |
| 4 | Bob Adams | Canada | 11.95 | 650 |

Heat 2

| Rank | Athlete | Country | Time | Points |
|---|---|---|---|---|
| 1 | Friedel Schirmer | Germany | 11.68 | 678 |
| 2 | Pat Leane | Australia | 11.82 | 623 |
| 3 | Georges Breitman | France | 13.70 | 254 |

Heat 3

| Rank | Athlete | Country | Time | Points |
|---|---|---|---|---|
| 1 | Sergey Kuznetsov | Soviet Union | 11.56 | 768 |
| 2 | Kjell Tånnander | Sweden | 11.59 | 768 |
| 3 | Erkki Hautamäki | Finland | 12.22 | 572 |

Heat 4

| Rank | Athlete | Country | Time | Points |
|---|---|---|---|---|
| 1 | Geoff Elliott | Great Britain | 11.45 | 869 |
| 2 | Brígido Iriarte | Venezuela | 11.66 | 707 |
| 3 | Héctor Román | Puerto Rico | 11.70 | 678 |
| 4 | Max Wehrli | Switzerland | 11.93 | 650 |

Heat 5

| Rank | Athlete | Country | Time | Points |
|---|---|---|---|---|
| 1 | Floyd Simmons | United States | 11.52 | 737 |
| 2 | Hugues Frayer | France | 11.61 | 707 |
| 3 | Oto Rebula | Yugoslavia | 11.72 | 678 |

Heat 6

| Rank | Athlete | Country | Time | Points |
|---|---|---|---|---|
| 1 | Olli Reikko | Finland | 11.43 | 800 |
| 2 | Fotios Kosmas | Greece | 11.53 | 737 |
| 3 | Hernán Figueroa | Chile | 11.73 | 678 |
| 4 | Reinaldo Oliver | Puerto Rico | 11.89 | 623 |

Heat 7

| Rank | Athlete | Country | Time | Points |
|---|---|---|---|---|
| 1 | Göran Widenfelt | Sweden | 11.53 | 768 |
| 2 | Pyotr Kozhevnikov | Soviet Union | 11.60 | 768 |

Heat 8

| Rank | Athlete | Country | Time | Points |
|---|---|---|---|---|
| 1 | Bob Mathias | United States | 11.08 | 948 |
| 2 | Sepp Hipp | Germany | 11.46 | 768 |
| 3 | Fernando Fernandes | Portugal | 11.54 | 737 |

Heat 9

| Rank | Athlete | Country | Time | Points |
|---|---|---|---|---|
| 1 | Ignace Heinrich | France | 11.61 | 737 |
| 2 | Eeles Landström | Finland | 12.10 | 597 |

=== Long Jump ===
| Rank | Athlete | Country | Distance | Points |
|---|---|---|---|---|
| 1 | Ignace Heinrich | France | 7.10 | 818 |
| 2 | Vladimir Volkov | Soviet Union | 7.09 | 815 |
| 2 | Sergey Kuznetsov | Soviet Union | 7.09 | 815 |
| 4 | Floyd Simmons | United States | 7.06 | 804 |
| 4 | Brígido Iriarte | Venezuela | 7.06 | 804 |
| 6 | Bob Mathias | United States | 6.98 | 779 |
| 7 | Carlos Vera | Chile | 6.96 | 773 |
| 8 | Kjell Tånnander | Sweden | 6.90 | 755 |
| 9 | Sepp Hipp | Germany | 6.85 | 740 |
| 10 | Hugues Frayer | France | 6.80 | 725 |
| 11 | Göran Widenfelt | Sweden | 6.76 | 713 |
| 12 | Milt Campbell | United States | 6.74 | 707 |
| 13 | Eeles Landström | Finland | 6.70 | 695 |
| 14 | Olli Reikko | Finland | 6.66 | 684 |
| 15 | Oto Rebula | Yugoslavia | 6.64 | 678 |
| 16 | Fernando Fernandes | Portugal | 6.52 | 645 |
| 17 | Max Wehrli | Switzerland | 6.48 | 635 |
| 18 | Héctor Román | Puerto Rico | 6.47 | 632 |
| 19 | Geoff Elliott | Great Britain | 6.44 | 624 |
| 20 | Hernán Figueroa | Chile | 6.38 | 608 |
| 21 | Friedel Schirmer | Germany | 6.37 | 605 |
| 21 | Erkki Hautamäki | Finland | 6.37 | 605 |
| 23 | Bob Adams | Canada | 6.22 | 567 |
| 24 | Fotios Kosmas | Greece | 6.20 | 562 |
| 25 | Reinaldo Oliver | Puerto Rico | 6.15 | 550 |
| 26 | Pyotr Kozhevnikov | Soviet Union | 5.80 | 466 |
| 27 | Georges Breitman | France | 5.43 | 385 |
| 28 | Pat Leane | Australia | 5.22 | 341 |

=== Shot Put ===
| Rank | Athlete | Country | Distance | Points |
|---|---|---|---|---|
| 1 | Bob Mathias | United States | 15.30 | 912 |
| 2 | Milt Campbell | United States | 13.89 | 759 |
| 3 | Sepp Hipp | Germany | 13.26 | 696 |
| 4 | Floyd Simmons | United States | 13.18 | 688 |
| 5 | Kjell Tånnander | Sweden | 12.97 | 669 |
| 6 | Oto Rebula | Yugoslavia | 12.90 | 663 |
| 7 | Hernán Figueroa | Chile | 12.87 | 660 |
| 8 | Ignace Heinrich | France | 12.83 | 656 |
| 9 | Max Wehrli | Switzerland | 12.73 | 647 |
| 10 | Friedel Schirmer | Germany | 12.69 | 644 |
| 11 | Vladimir Volkov | Soviet Union | 12.62 | 637 |
| 12 | Geoff Elliott | Great Britain | 12.40 | 618 |
| 13 | Hugues Frayer | France | 12.36 | 614 |
| 14 | Erkki Hautamäki | Finland | 12.19 | 599 |
| 15 | Bob Adams | Canada | 12.01 | 582 |
| 16 | Olli Reikko | Finland | 11.85 | 568 |
| 17 | Eeles Landström | Finland | 11.75 | 560 |
| 18 | Sergey Kuznetsov | Soviet Union | 11.71 | 556 |
| 19 | Brígido Iriarte | Venezuela | 11.66 | 552 |
| 20 | Göran Widenfelt | Sweden | 11.61 | 548 |
| 21 | Héctor Román | Puerto Rico | 11.56 | 544 |
| 22 | Fernando Fernandes | Portugal | 11.20 | 516 |
| 23 | Reinaldo Oliver | Puerto Rico | 10.22 | 437 |
| 24 | Carlos Vera | Chile | 9.52 | 387 |
| 25 | Georges Breitman | France | 9.28 | 369 |

=== High Jump ===
| Rank | Athlete | Country | Distance | Points |
|---|---|---|---|---|
| 1 | Göran Widenfelt | Sweden | 1.94 | 960 |
| 2 | Floyd Simmons | United States | 1.92 | 930 |
| 3 | Bob Mathias | United States | 1.90 | 900 |
| 4 | Ignace Heinrich | France | 1.88 | 872 |
| 5 | Milt Campbell | United States | 1.85 | 832 |
| 5 | Kjell Tånnander | Sweden | 1.85 | 832 |
| 7 | Friedel Schirmer | Germany | 1.80 | 770 |
| 8 | Vladimir Volkov | Soviet Union | 1.75 | 711 |
| 8 | Sepp Hipp | Germany | 1.75 | 711 |
| 8 | Geoff Elliott | Great Britain | 1.75 | 711 |
| 8 | Eeles Landström | Finland | 1.75 | 711 |
| 8 | Bob Adams | Canada | 1.75 | 711 |
| 8 | Carlos Vera | Chile | 1.75 | 711 |
| 14 | Olli Reikko | Finland | 1.70 | 656 |
| 14 | Fernando Fernandes | Portugal | 1.70 | 656 |
| 14 | Reinaldo Oliver | Puerto Rico | 1.70 | 656 |
| 14 | Erkki Hautamäki | Finland | 1.70 | 656 |
| 18 | Sergey Kuznetsov | Soviet Union | 1.65 | 605 |
| 18 | Hugues Frayer | France | 1.65 | 605 |
| 18 | Oto Rebula | Yugoslavia | 1.65 | 605 |
| 18 | Héctor Román | Puerto Rico | 1.65 | 605 |
| 22 | Brígido Iriarte | Venezuela | 1.60 | 555 |
| 22 | Hernán Figueroa | Chile | 1.60 | 555 |
| 22 | Max Wehrli | Switzerland | 1.60 | 555 |
| 25 | Georges Breitman | France | 1.50 | 464 |

=== 400m ===
Heat 1

| Rank | Athlete | Country | Time | Points |
|---|---|---|---|---|
| 1 | Bob Mathias | United States | 50.2 | 828 |
| 2 | Sergey Kuznetsov | Soviet Union | 52.8 | 654 |
| 3 | Max Wehrli | Switzerland | 54.7 | 545 |

Heat 2

| Rank | Athlete | Country | Time | Points |
|---|---|---|---|---|
| 1 | Vladimir Volkov | Soviet Union | 51.2 | 758 |
| 2 | Göran Widenfelt | Sweden | 51.3 | 751 |
| 3 | Hugues Frayer | France | 51.3 | 751 |
| 4 | Reinaldo Oliver | Puerto Rico | 53.4 | 618 |

Heat 3

| Rank | Athlete | Country | Time | Points |
|---|---|---|---|---|
| 1 | Hernán Figueroa | Chile | 52.8 | 654 |
| 2 | Oto Rebula | Yugoslavia | 54.3 | 565 |

Heat 4

| Rank | Athlete | Country | Time | Points |
|---|---|---|---|---|
| 1 | Milt Campbell | United States | 50.9 | 779 |
| 2 | Sepp Hipp | Germany | 51.3 | 751 |
| 3 | Bob Adams | Canada | 55.2 | 520 |

Heat 5

| Rank | Athlete | Country | Time | Points |
|---|---|---|---|---|
| 1 | Olli Reikko | Finland | 50.3 | 821 |
| 2 | Ignace Heinrich | France | 51.0 | 772 |
| 3 | Floyd Simmons | United States | 51.1 | 765 |

Heat 6

| Rank | Athlete | Country | Time | Points |
|---|---|---|---|---|
| 1 | Friedel Schirmer | Germany | 50.5 | 807 |
| 2 | Geoff Elliott | Great Britain | 53.0 | 642 |
| 3 | Brígido Iriarte | Venezuela | 53.1 | 636 |

Heat 7

| Rank | Athlete | Country | Time | Points |
|---|---|---|---|---|
| 1 | Kjell Tånnander | Sweden | 52.6 | 666 |
| 2 | Héctor Román | Puerto Rico | 52.7 | 660 |
| 3 | Erkki Hautamäki | Finland | 53.9 | 588 |

Heat 8

| Rank | Athlete | Country | Time | Points |
|---|---|---|---|---|
| 1 | Fernando Fernandes | Portugal | 51.2 | 758 |
| 2 | Eeles Landström | Finland | 56.7 | 445 |
| 3 | Georges Breitman | France | 1:03.9 | 189 |

=== 110m Hurdles ===
Heat 1

| Rank | Athlete | Country | Time | Points |
|---|---|---|---|---|
| 1 | Friedel Schirmer | Germany | 16.0 | 593 |
| 2 | Bob Adams | Canada | 16.6 | 489 |

Heat 2

| Rank | Athlete | Country | Time | Points |
|---|---|---|---|---|
| 1 | Ignace Heinrich | France | 16.0 | 593 |
| 2 | Brígido Iriarte | Venezuela | 16.6 | 489 |
| 3 | Reinaldo Oliver | Puerto Rico | 16.7 | 473 |
| 4 | Eeles Landström | Finland | 17.1 | 413 |

Heat 3

| Rank | Athlete | Country | Time | Points |
|---|---|---|---|---|
| 1 | Hugues Frayer | France | 15.4 | 716 |
| 2 | Kjell Tånnander | Sweden | 15.8 | 632 |
| 3 | Fernando Fernandes | Portugal | 15.8 | 632 |
| 4 | Olli Reikko | Finland | 18.8 | 208 |

Heat 4

| Rank | Athlete | Country | Time | Points |
|---|---|---|---|---|
| 1 | Milt Campbell | United States | 14.5 | 953 |
| 2 | Floyd Simmons | United States | 15.0 | 813 |
| 3 | Vladimir Volkov | Soviet Union | 15.8 | 632 |
| 4 | Erkki Hautamäki | Finland | 16.3 | 540 |

Heat 5

| Rank | Athlete | Country | Time | Points |
|---|---|---|---|---|
| 1 | Sepp Hipp | Germany | 16.1 | 575 |
| 2 | Hernán Figueroa | Chile | 16.4 | 523 |

Heat 6

| Rank | Athlete | Country | Time | Points |
|---|---|---|---|---|
| 1 | Göran Widenfelt | Sweden | 16.1 | 575 |
| 2 | Héctor Román | Puerto Rico | 16.4 | 523 |

Heat 7

| Rank | Athlete | Country | Time | Points |
|---|---|---|---|---|
| 1 | Bob Mathias | United States | 14.7 | 894 |
| 2 | Geoff Elliott | Great Britain | 15.7 | 652 |

Heat 8

| Rank | Athlete | Country | Time | Points |
|---|---|---|---|---|
| 1 | Oto Rebula | Yugoslavia | 16.0 | 593 |
| 2 | Sergey Kuznetsov | Soviet Union | 16.4 | 523 |
| 3 | Max Wehrli | Switzerland | 16.4 | 523 |

=== Discus Throw ===
| Rank | Athlete | Country | Distance | Points |
|---|---|---|---|---|
| 1 | Bob Mathias | United States | 46.89 | 838 |
| 2 | Sepp Hipp | Germany | 45.84 | 802 |
| 3 | Bob Adams | Canada | 42.45 | 696 |
| 4 | Sergey Kuznetsov | Soviet Union | 41.04 | 656 |
| 5 | Milt Campbell | United States | 40.50 | 640 |
| 6 | Hugues Frayer | France | 40.02 | 627 |
| 7 | Göran Widenfelt | Sweden | 39.53 | 613 |
| 8 | Kjell Tånnander | Sweden | 39.30 | 607 |
| 9 | Oto Rebula | Yugoslavia | 38.55 | 587 |
| 10 | Brígido Iriarte | Venezuela | 38.23 | 578 |
| 11 | Hernán Figueroa | Chile | 38.08 | 574 |
| 12 | Vladimir Volkov | Soviet Union | 38.04 | 573 |
| 13 | Floyd Simmons | United States | 37.77 | 566 |
| 14 | Erkki Hautamäki | Finland | 37.20 | 552 |
| 15 | Friedel Schirmer | Germany | 37.01 | 547 |
| 16 | Max Wehrli | Switzerland | 36.81 | 541 |
| 17 | Eeles Landström | Finland | 34.51 | 483 |
| 18 | Fernando Fernandes | Portugal | 34.27 | 477 |
| 19 | Geoff Elliott | Great Britain | 34.21 | 476 |
| 20 | Héctor Román | Puerto Rico | 32.98 | 446 |
| 21 | Olli Reikko | Finland | 30.72 | 392 |
| 22 | Reinaldo Oliver | Puerto Rico | 29.95 | 374 |

=== Pole Vault ===
| Rank | Athlete | Country | Distance | Points |
|---|---|---|---|---|
| 1 | Eeles Landström | Finland | 4.20 | 855 |
| 2 | Geoff Elliott | Great Britain | 4.10 | 795 |
| 3 | Bob Mathias | United States | 4.00 | 745 |
| 4 | Vladimir Volkov | Soviet Union | 3.80 | 645 |
| 4 | Max Wehrli | Switzerland | 3.80 | 645 |
| 6 | Bob Adams | Canada | 3.70 | 596 |
| 7 | Floyd Simmons | United States | 3.60 | 556 |
| 7 | Sergey Kuznetsov | Soviet Union | 3.60 | 556 |
| 9 | Sepp Hipp | Germany | 3.50 | 516 |
| 9 | Göran Widenfelt | Sweden | 3.50 | 516 |
| 9 | Kjell Tånnander | Sweden | 3.50 | 516 |
| 9 | Friedel Schirmer | Germany | 3.50 | 516 |
| 9 | Olli Reikko | Finland | 3.50 | 516 |
| 9 | Hernán Figueroa | Chile | 3.50 | 516 |
| 9 | Reinaldo Oliver | Puerto Rico | 3.50 | 516 |
| 16 | Hugues Frayer | France | 3.40 | 476 |
| 16 | Brígido Iriarte | Venezuela | 3.40 | 476 |
| 16 | Oto Rebula | Yugoslavia | 3.40 | 476 |
| 16 | Héctor Román | Puerto Rico | 3.40 | 476 |
| 16 | Erkki Hautamäki | Finland | 3.40 | 476 |
| 21 | Milt Campbell | United States | 3.30 | 438 |
| 22 | Fernando Fernandes | Portugal | 3.00 | 328 |

=== Javelin Throw ===
| Rank | Athlete | Country | Distance | Points |
|---|---|---|---|---|
| 1 | Bob Mathias | United States | 59.21 | 715 |
| 2 | Eeles Landström | Finland | 57.61 | 680 |
| 3 | Vladimir Volkov | Soviet Union | 56.68 | 660 |
| 4 | Reinaldo Oliver | Puerto Rico | 56.68 | 660 |
| 5 | Brígido Iriarte | Venezuela | 55.55 | 637 |
| 6 | Floyd Simmons | United States | 54.69 | 620 |
| 7 | Milt Campbell | United States | 54.54 | 617 |
| 8 | Sepp Hipp | Germany | 54.14 | 609 |
| 9 | Friedel Schirmer | Germany | 54.00 | 606 |
| 10 | Erkki Hautamäki | Finland | 53.57 | 597 |
| 11 | Kjell Tånnander | Sweden | 52.79 | 582 |
| 12 | Olli Reikko | Finland | 51.41 | 554 |
| 13 | Oto Rebula | Yugoslavia | 51.39 | 554 |
| 14 | Hernán Figueroa | Chile | 51.22 | 550 |
| 15 | Max Wehrli | Switzerland | 51.08 | 548 |
| 16 | Héctor Román | Puerto Rico | 49.80 | 525 |
| 17 | Geoff Elliott | Great Britain | 49.56 | 520 |
| 18 | Göran Widenfelt | Sweden | 49.36 | 517 |
| 19 | Bob Adams | Canada | 44.83 | 436 |
| 20 | Fernando Fernandes | Portugal | 43.55 | 414 |
| 21 | Sergey Kuznetsov | Soviet Union | 43.19 | 408 |
| 22 | Hugues Frayer | France | 41.31 | 376 |

=== 1500m ===
Heat 1

| Rank | Athlete | Country | Time | Points |
|---|---|---|---|---|
| 1 | Olli Reikko | Finland | 4:28.0 | 526 |
| 2 | Fernando Fernandes | Portugal | 4:37.0 | 441 |
| 3 | Göran Widenfelt | Sweden | 4:38.6 | 427 |
| 4 | Reinaldo Oliver | Puerto Rico | 4:51.8 | 321 |
| 5 | Bob Adams | Canada | 4:57.0 | 283 |
| 6 | Max Wehrli | Switzerland | 4:58.6 | 272 |

Heat 2

| Rank | Athlete | Country | Time | Points |
|---|---|---|---|---|
| 1 | Vladimir Volkov | Soviet Union | 4:33.2 | 475 |
| 2 | Kjell Tånnander | Sweden | 4:57.2 | 281 |
| 3 | Eeles Landström | Finland | 5:01.0 | 255 |
| 4 | Hugues Frayer | France | 5:14.4 | 175 |
| 5 | Héctor Román | Puerto Rico | 5:14.4 | 175 |

Heat 3

| Rank | Athlete | Country | Time | Points |
|---|---|---|---|---|
| 1 | Sergey Kuznetsov | Soviet Union | 4:42.0 | 396 |
| 2 | Friedel Schirmer | Germany | 4:47.6 | 352 |
| 3 | Brígido Iriarte | Venezuela | 4:49.8 | 336 |
| 4 | Bob Mathias | United States | 4:50.8 | 328 |
| 5 | Floyd Simmons | United States | 4:53.4 | 309 |

Heat 4

| Rank | Athlete | Country | Time | Points |
|---|---|---|---|---|
| 1 | Sepp Hipp | Germany | 4:57.2 | 281 |
| 2 | Hernán Figueroa | Chile | 4:58.2 | 274 |
| 3 | Oto Rebula | Yugoslavia | 5:01.8 | 249 |
| 4 | Geoff Elliott | Great Britain | 5:03.6 | 238 |
| 5 | Milt Campbell | United States | 5:07.2 | 216 |

== Final standings ==
The highest mark recorded in each event is highlighted in yellow. These marks were split between six competitors with the gold medallist claiming four of them.

| Pos | Athlete | Total Points | 100m | LJ | SP | HJ | 400m | 110m H | DT | PV | JT | 1500m |
|---|---|---|---|---|---|---|---|---|---|---|---|---|
| 1st place, gold medalist(s) | Bob Mathias (USA) | 7,887 WR | 948 | 779 | 912 | 900 | 828 | 894 | 838 | 745 | 715 | 328 |
| 2nd place, silver medalist(s) | Milt Campbell (USA) | 6,975 | 1,034 | 707 | 759 | 832 | 779 | 953 | 640 | 438 | 617 | 216 |
| 3rd place, bronze medalist(s) | Floyd Simmons (USA) | 6,788 | 737 | 804 | 688 | 930 | 765 | 813 | 566 | 556 | 620 | 309 |
| 4 | Vladimir Volkov (URS) | 6,674 | 768 | 815 | 637 | 711 | 758 | 632 | 573 | 645 | 660 | 475 |
| 5 | Sepp Hipp (GER) | 6,449 | 768 | 740 | 696 | 711 | 751 | 575 | 802 | 516 | 609 | 281 |
| 6 | Göran Widenfelt (SWE) | 6,388 | 768 | 713 | 548 | 960 | 751 | 575 | 613 | 516 | 517 | 427 |
| 7 | Kjell Tånnander (SWE) | 6,308 | 768 | 755 | 669 | 832 | 666 | 632 | 607 | 516 | 582 | 281 |
| 8 | Friedel Schirmer (GER) | 6,118 | 678 | 605 | 644 | 770 | 807 | 593 | 547 | 516 | 606 | 352 |
| 9 | Geoff Elliott (GBR) | 6,044 | 768 | 624 | 618 | 711 | 642 | 652 | 476 | 795 | 520 | 238 |
| 10 | Sergey Kuznetsov (URS) | 5,937 | 768 | 815 | 556 | 605 | 654 | 523 | 656 | 556 | 408 | 396 |
| 11 | Hugues Frayer (FRA) | 5,772 | 707 | 725 | 614 | 605 | 751 | 716 | 627 | 476 | 376 | 175 |
| 12 | Brígido Iriarte (VEN) | 5,770 | 707 | 804 | 552 | 555 | 636 | 489 | 578 | 476 | 637 | 336 |
| 13 | Olli Reikko (FIN) | 5,725 | 800 | 684 | 568 | 656 | 821 | 208 | 392 | 516 | 554 | 526 |
| 14 | Eeles Landström (FIN) | 5,694 | 597 | 695 | 560 | 711 | 445 | 413 | 483 | 855 | 680 | 255 |
| 15 | Oto Rebula (YUG) | 5,648 | 678 | 678 | 663 | 605 | 565 | 593 | 587 | 476 | 554 | 249 |
| 16 | Fernando Fernandes (POR) | 5,604 | 737 | 645 | 516 | 656 | 758 | 632 | 477 | 328 | 414 | 441 |
| 17 | Hernán Figueroa (CHI) | 5,592 | 678 | 608 | 660 | 555 | 654 | 523 | 574 | 516 | 550 | 274 |
| 18 | Max Wehrli (SUI) | 5,561 | 650 | 635 | 647 | 555 | 545 | 523 | 541 | 645 | 548 | 272 |
| 19 | Bob Adams (CAN) | 5,530 | 650 | 567 | 582 | 711 | 520 | 489 | 696 | 596 | 436 | 283 |
| 20 | Héctor Román (PUR) | 5,264 | 678 | 632 | 544 | 605 | 660 | 523 | 446 | 476 | 525 | 175 |
| 21 | Reinaldo Oliver (PUR) | 5,228 | 623 | 550 | 437 | 656 | 618 | 473 | 374 | 516 | 660 | 321 |
| | Erkki Hautamäki (FIN) | DNF | 572 | 605 | 599 | 656 | 588 | 540 | 552 | 476 | 597 | |
| | Ignace Heinrich (FRA) | DNF | 737 | 818 | 656 | 872 | 772 | 593 | | | | |
| | Georges Breitman (FRA) | DNF | 254 | 385 | 369 | 464 | 189 | | | | | |
| | Carlos Vera (CHI) | DNF | 870 | 773 | 387 | 711 | | | | | | |
| | Fotios Kosmas (GRE) | DNF | 737 | 562 | | | | | | | | |
| | Pyotr Kozhevnikov (URS) | DNF | 768 | 446 | | | | | | | | |
| | Pat Leane (AUS) | DNF | 623 | 341 | | | | | | | | |
| | Ray Weinberg (AUS) | DNS | | | | | | | | | | |
| | Edmond Ohaco (CHI) | DNS | | | | | | | | | | |
| | Georgios Roumpanis (GRE) | DNS | | | | | | | | | | |
| | Örn Clausen (ISL) | DNS | | | | | | | | | | |
| | Hércules Azcune (URU) | DNS | | | | | | | | | | |
