= Deaths in June 2005 =

The following is a list of notable deaths in June 2005.

Entries for each day are listed alphabetically by surname. A typical entry lists information in the following sequence:

- Name, age, country of citizenship at birth, subsequent country of citizenship (if applicable), reason for notability, cause of death (if known), and reference.

== June 2005 ==
=== 1 ===
- Mariana Dimitrova, 51, Bulgarian actress, suicide.
- Tory Epps, 38, American football player (Atlanta Falcons, Chicago Bears, New Orleans Saints).
- Louisiane Saint Fleurant, 80, Haitian artist and painter.
- Fernando Ghia, 69, Italian film producer and talent agent.
- Sara Guasch, 86, Chilean-Mexican actress.
- Norman Horowitz, 90, American geneticist at the California Institute of Technology.
- George Mikan, 80, American basketball player (Minneapolis Lakers), diabetes.
- Geoffrey Toone, 94, British-based Irish actor.

=== 2 ===
- José António, 47. Portuguese footballer.
- Isabel Aretz, 96, Argentine musician.
- Vittorio Duse, 89, Italian actor (The Godfather Part III).
- Lucio España, 33, Colombian footballer.
- Larry Fallon, 68, American composer, arranger and record producer.
- Gunder Gundersen, 74, Norwegian Nordic combined skier, sports official, and Olympian (1960).
- Samir Kassir, 45, Lebanese journalist, bombed.
- Erich Leibenguth, 88, German footballer.
- Mike Marshall, 60, French-American actor (Moonraker), lung cancer.
- Melita Norwood, 93, British spy for the Soviet Union during the Cold War.
- Hy Peskin, 89, American photographer, kidney failure.
- Pastor Vega, 65, Cuban film director and screenwriter.
- Andriy Ishchenko, 67, Ukrainian Opera singer

=== 3 ===
- Leon Askin, 97, Austrian actor.
- Michael Billington, 63, British actor, cancer.
- Harold Cardinal, 60, Canadian Cree writer, lung cancer.
- Néstor Errea, 66, Argentine football player.
- Alex Freeleagus, 77, Australian diplomat and lawyer.
- Basil Pennington, 73, American trappist priest, writer, and speaker.
- Maurice Wiles, 81, British Anglican priest and academic.

=== 4 ===
- Paul Amen, 88, American athlete and coach.
- Carol Christensen, 67, American actress and model.
- Giancarlo De Carlo, 85, Italian architect.
- Marian Gleason, 88, American politician.
- Chloe Jones, 29, American adult film star, liver failure.
- Leo Klier, 82, American basketball player (Notre Dame Fighting Irish, Fort Wayne Pistons).
- Banks McFadden, 88, American gridiron football player (Clemson Tigers, Brooklyn Dodgers).
- Jean O'Leary, 57, American lesbian and gay rights activist and politician, lung cancer.
- Yin Shun, 99, Chinese Buddhist philosopher, tuberculosis.
- Karl Steinbuch, 87, German computer scientist, cyberneticist, and electrical engineer.
- Lorna Thayer, 86, American character actress (Five Easy Pieces), Alzheimer's disease.
- Ken Weafer, 92, American baseball player (Boston Bees).

=== 5 ===
- Pepita Carpena, 85, Spanish trade unionist and anarchist.
- Hugh Marshall Cole, 94, American historian and army officer, vascular disease.
- Kurt Graunke, 89, German composer and conductor.
- Ken Griffith, 86, American basketball player.
- George Isaak, 72, Polish-Australian physicist and asteroseismologist.
- Wee Chong Jin, 87, Malayan-Singaporean judge, cancer.
- Susi Nicoletti, 86, Austrian film actress, complications from heart surgery.
- Matic Šušteršič, 25, Slovenian Olympic sprinter (2000).
- Lothar Warneke, 68, German film director, screenwriter and actor.
- Clyde Williams, 85, American baseball player.
- Adolfo Aguilar Zínser, 55, Mexican scholar, diplomat and politician, traffic collision.

=== 6 ===
- Tullio Altamura, 80, Italian actor.
- Anne Bancroft, 73, American actress (The Miracle Worker, The Graduate, The Pumpkin Eater), Oscar winner (1963), uterine cancer.
- André Chavet, 74, French Olympic basketball player (1952).
- Dana Elcar, 77, American actor (MacGyver, The Sting, Fail Safe), pneumonia.
- Maya Kopitseva, 81, Russian painter, cancer.
- Pamela May, 88, British ballet dancer.
- Mary Beaumont Medd, 97, British architect.
- Siegfried Palm, 78, German cellist.
- David C. Sutherland III, 56, American illustrator for the original Dungeons & Dragons books, chronic liver failure.

=== 7 ===
- Seán Doherty, 60, Irish politician.
- Terry Long, 45, American NFL football player (Pittsburgh Steelers), suicide.
- Edward A. McCarthy, 87, American Roman Catholic prelate, second Archbishop of Miami.
- Davud Məhəmmədov, 34, Azerbaijani Olympic wrestler (1996, 2000).
- Simon Waronker, 90, American violinist and record producer.

=== 8 ===
- Ahmed Ali, Fijian academic and politician.
- Joe Bill Baumgardner, 80, American football player (Texas Longhorns, Detroit Lions).
- Ed Bishop, 72, American-British actor (UFO, Captain Scarlet and the Mysterons, Brass Target).
- Arthur Dunkel, 72, Portuguese-Swiss GATT director-general.
- Servílio, 65, Brazilian football player, heart attack.

=== 9 ===
- James Clements, 77, American ornithologist and author, leukemia.
- Slade Cutter, 93, American naval officer and gridiron football player.
- Richard Eberhart, 101, American poet.
- Samih Farsoun, 68, American sociologist and academic.
- Erik Jørgensen, 85, Danish Olympic middle-distance runner (1948).
- Trude Marlen, 92, Austrian stage and film actress.
- John Schweder, 77, American football player (Baltimore Colts, Pittsburgh Steelers).
- Inna Ulyanova, 70, Soviet and Russian actress, singer and comedian, liver cirrhosis.

=== 10 ===
- Michèle Auclair, 80, French violinist.
- Nick Darke, 56, British playwright, stroke.
- Pere Esteve i Abad, 62, Spanish politician and Catalan nationalist.
- J. James Exon, 83, American politician, senator (1979–1997) and Governor of Nebraska (1971–1979).
- Yumiko Kurahashi, 69, Japanese writer.
- Lyphard, 36, American thoroughbred racehorse and sire.
- Shinji Nagashima, 67, Japanese manga artist.
- Curtis Pitts, 89, American aircraft designer (Pitts Special).
- Joseph Raya, 88, Lebanese-Canadian Melkite Catholic archbishop, theologian, and civil rights advocate.
- Kenneth N. Taylor, 88, American evangelical publisher and author, heart failure.

=== 11 ===
- Francesco Albanese, 92, Italian opera singer.
- Anne-Marie Alonzo, 53, Canadian writer.
- José Beyaert, 79, French cyclist and Olympian (1948).
- Audrey Brown, 92, British sprinter and Olympic silver medalist (1936).
- Robert Clarke, 85, American actor, diabetes.
- Ghena Dimitrova, 64, Bulgarian opera singer, cancer.
- Vasco Gonçalves, 84, Portuguese army general, Prime Minister (1974–1975).
- Tom Holden, 67, American television news anchor (WKBN-TV), complications from a blood infection.
- Lillian Lux, 86, American Yiddish vaudeville actress and singer, congestive heart failure.
- Diego Mariscal, 79, Mexican Olympic diver (1948).
- Lon McCallister, 82, American actor, heart failure.
- Ron Randell, 86, Australian-American actor, stroke.
- Juan José Saer, 67, Argentine novelist, lung cancer.

=== 12 ===
- Emmanuelle Arsan, 73, Thai-French novelist, cholangiocarcinoma.
- Sonja Davies, 81, New Zealand trade unionist.
- Brandy Davis, 77, American baseball player (Pittsburgh Pirates).
- Jack Flagerman, 83, American football player (Saint Mary's Gaels, Los Angeles Dons).
- Eiichi Goto, 74, Japanese computer scientist.
- Hans-Günther Hilker, 73, German Olympic water polo player (1956).
- Barry Hutchinson, 69, English football player.
- Wayne McClure, 62, American football player (Ole Miss Rebels, Cincinnati Bengals).
- Makobo Modjadji, 26, South African Rain Queen of the Balobedu people, meningitis.
- David Whitney, 66, American art curator, collector, gallerist and critic, cancer.
- Scott Young, 87, Canadian journalist and father of Neil Young.

=== 13 ===
- Jonathan Adams, 74, British actor (The Rocky Horror Picture Show), stroke.
- Gerard Béhague, 67, French-American ethnomusicologist.
- Álvaro Cunhal, 91, Portuguese politician, secretary-general of the Portuguese Communist Party (1961–1992), writer and painter.
- Eugénio de Andrade, 82, Portuguese poet.
- David Diamond, 89, American composer, heart attack.
- Bruno Landi, 76, Italian racing cyclist.
- Jesús Moncada, Spanish writer, cancer.
- Lane Smith, 69, American actor (Lois & Clark: The New Adventures of Superman, The Mighty Ducks, My Cousin Vinny), complications from ALS.

=== 14 ===
- Heinz Bechert, 72, German indologist and buddhologist.
- N. J. Crisp, 81, British television writer, dramatist and novelist.
- Georges Dransart, 81, French sprint Olympic canoeist (1948, 1952, 1956).
- Lionel Elvin, 99, British educational theorist.
- Carlo Maria Giulini, 91, Italian conductor.
- Eivin Kristensen, 79, Danish rower and Olympian (1952).
- Bob Lennon, 76, American baseball player (New York Giants, Chicago Cubs).
- Robie Lester, 80, American voice artist, actress and singer, cancer.
- Norman Levine, 81, Canadian writer.
- Mimi Parent, 80, Canadian surrealist painter.
- André Vanderstappen, 71, Belgian footballer.

=== 15 ===
- Rodrigo Asturias, 65, Guatemalan guerilla leader and politician, heart attack.
- Reuven Dafni, 91, Croatian-Israeli soldier and diplomat.
- Suzanne Flon, 87, French actress, gastroenteritis.
- Alessio Galletti, 37, Italian racing cyclist, cardiac arrest.
- Albert Mohr, 75, German Olympic cross-country skier (1952).
- Vasile Morar, 52, Romanian Olympic ice hockey player (1976).
- Valeria Moriconi, 73, Italian actress, cancer.
- Carroll Sembera, 63, American baseball player (Houston Astros, Montreal Expos).
- Per Henrik Wallin, 58, Swedish jazz pianist and composer.

=== 16 ===
- Corino Andrade, 99, Portuguese neurologist, discovered familial amyloidotic polyneuropathy (FAP).
- Enrique Laguerre, 99, Puerto Rican writer, poet, and teacher.
- Mayoori, 22, Indian actress, suicide.
- Alex McAvoy, 77, Scottish actor (Pink Floyd – The Wall, The Vital Spark, Strictly Sinatra), leukemia.
- Geoffrey Parrinder, 95, British theologian and Methodist minister.
- Ross Stretton, 53, Australian ballet dancer and artistic director of Australian Ballet, melanoma.
- James Weinstein, 78, American Jewish author, founder and publisher of In These Times..

=== 17 ===
- Billy Bauer, 89, American jazz guitarist.
- Nanna Ditzel, 81, Danish furniture and interior designer.
- William N. Fenton, 96, American scholar known for writings on the Iroquois.
- Åke Hallgren, 86, Swedish Olympic triple jumper (1948).
- Susanna Javicoli, 50, Italian actress (La nottata, Suspiria), kidney cancer.
- Andrew Justice, 54, British rower and Olympic silver medalist (1976, 1980).
- Gene Miller, 77, American investigative reporter at the Miami Herald, cancer.
- Keith Morris, 66, English photographer.
- Karl Mueller, 41, American musician, esophageal cancer.
- Tetiana Yablonska, 88, Soviet Ukrainian artist.

=== 18 ===
- Mushtaq Ali, 90, Indian cricketer, Padma Shree Award winner.
- Cay Forrester, 83, American writer and actress, pneumonia.
- Chris Griffin, 74, American jazz trumpeter, melanoma.
- Basil Kirchin, 77, British musician.
- Sanjaya Lall, 64, Indian economist.
- Tatsuo Matsumura, 90, Japanese actor.
- J. J. Pickle, 91, American politician, Congressional Representative from Texas (1963–1995), prostate cancer.
- Erv Prasse, 87, American multi-sport athlete.
- Amal Kumar Raychaudhuri, 81, Indian physicist.
- Manuel Sadosky, 91, Argentine mathematician and Secretary of State of Science and Technology (1983–1989).

=== 19 ===
- Allan Beckett, 91, British engineer.
- Robert Ellis Cahill, 70, American folklorist and author.
- Zdravko Ježić, 73, Croatian water polo player and Olympic silver medalist (1952, 1956, 1960).
- Aleksey Kiselyov, 67, Russian boxer and Olympic silver medalist (1964, 1968).
- Totta Näslund, 60, Swedish musician, singer and actor, liver cancer.
- Ray Parkin, 94, Australian writer.

=== 20 ===
- Larry Collins, 75, American writer, cerebral hemorrhage.
- James Galli, 82, French Olympic boxer (1948).
- Charles David Keeling, 77, American scientist and oceanographer, heart attack.
- Jack Kilby, 81, American engineer, inventor of the integrated circuit and physics Nobel Prize winner.
- Pierre Legrain, 85, French Olympic hammer thrower (1948, 1952).
- Pete Leswick, 88, Canadian ice hockey right winger (New York Americans).
- Bernard Adolph Schriever, 94, American Air Force general, regarded as the architect of the space and ballistic missile programs.
- Bengt Sjösten, 79, Swedish Olympic sailor (1960).
- Luis Suárez, 66, Argentine footballer.

=== 21 ===
- Munu Adhi, 78, Indian politician.
- Kaarlo Anttinen, 90, Finnish Olympic equestrian (1956).
- George Hawi, 67, Lebanese politician, secretary general of Communist Party of Lebanon, terrorist attack.
- Dick Johnson, 82, US Virgin Islander Olympic sailor (1976).
- Geoffrey Jones, 73, British documentary maker, cancer.
- Alvin D. Loving, 69, African-American abstract expressionist painter.
- Guillermo Suárez Mason, 81, Argentine military officer convicted for his crimes during the Dirty War, cardiovascular disease.
- Iwao Miyajima, 91, Japanese Olympic ski jumper (1936).
- David Vaughan Pugh, 97, Canadian politician, member of the House of Commons of Canada (1958-1968).
- Jaime Sin, 76, Filipino Roman Catholic cardinal and former archbishop of Manila, kidney failure.
- Louis H. Wilson, 85, United States Marine Corps general and recipient of the Medal of Honor for his actions during WWII.

=== 22 ===
- Sunder Singh Bhandari, 84, Indian politician.
- William Donaldson, 70, British satirist and theatrical producer of Beyond The Fringe.
- Ton Fontani, 74, Dutch Olympic rower (1952).
- Michael Imoudu, 102, Nigerian labour union leader.
- Carson Parks, 69, American musician.
- Max Roqueta, 96, French Occitan language writer.

=== 23 ===
- Nikolay Afanasevsky, 64, Russian diplomat.
- Shana Alexander, 79, American journalist, cancer.
- Manolis Anagnostakis, 80, Greek poet.
- Pietro Balestra, 70, Swiss economist.
- Isidore Cohen, 82, American violinist with the Beaux Arts Trio.
- Imre Kapossy, 89, Hungarian Olympic rower (1936).
- Hanna Kvanmo, 79, Norwegian politician.
- Sam Kweskin, 81, American advertising and comic book artist.
- Milt Popovich, 91, American football player (Montana Grizzlies, Chicago Cardinals).
- Olli Reikko, 78, Finnish Olympic decathlete (1952).
- Nahum M. Sarna, 82, British-Israeli-American biblical scholar.
- Ramona M. Valdez, 20, Dominican-born United States Marine.

=== 24 ===
- Lyman Bostock Sr., 87, American baseball player.
- Peter Casserly, 107, Australian centenarian, last surviving member of the World War I First Australian Imperial Force.
- Louis Fortin, 84, Canadian politician, member of the House of Commons of Canada (1958-1962).
- Eva Philbin, 91, Irish chemist.
- Béla Rerrich, 87, Hungarian fencer and Olympic silver medalist (1948, 1952, 1956).
- Yedidia Shofet, 96, Chief Rabbi of Iran and the spiritual leader of Persian Jewry.
- Ronald B. Stafford, 69, American lawyer and politician from New York, lung cancer.
- Paul Winchell, 82, American voice actor (Winnie the Pooh, The Fox and the Hound, The Smurfs) and ventriloquist.

=== 25 ===
- Qayyum Changezi, 69, Pakistani footballer.
- Émile Courtois, 86, Belgian Olympic wrestler (1952).
- John Fiedler, 80, American actor (12 Angry Men, Winnie the Pooh, True Grit), cancer.
- Harry Gibbs, 88, Australian Chief Justice of the High Court of Australia 1981-87.
- Salim Halali, 84, Algerian singer.
- Chet Helms, 62, American rock music promoter, hepatitis.
- Robert K. Killian, 85, American politician and attorney.
- Jiří Kodet, 67, Czech actor.
- Kâzım Koyuncu, 33, Turkish singer-songwriter and activist, testicular cancer.
- Olga Lauristin, 102, Soviet and Estonian politician.
- John Simmons, 92, British Olympic canoeist (1948).

=== 26 ===
- Filip Adwent, 49, Polish politician, traffic collision.
- Roland Ducke, 70, German football player, prostate cancer.
- Vladimir Kryukov, 79, Soviet Russian rower and Olympian (1952, 1956).
- Tõnno Lepmets, 67, Estonian basketball player.
- Eknath Solkar, 57, Indian cricketer, heart attack.
- Joop Stoffelen, 84, Dutch footballer and Olympian (1948), Parkinson's disease.
- Grete Sultan, 99, German-American pianist.
- Richard Whiteley, 61, British television presenter, pneumonia.

=== 27 ===
- Robert Byrne, 50, American songwriter.
- Fred Dutton, 82, American lawyer, advisor to President Kennedy.
- Shelby Foote, 88, American historian, heart attack.
- Frank Harte, 72, Irish traditional singer and song collector, heart attack.
- Domino Harvey, 35, British model-turned-bounty hunter and daughter of actor Laurence Harvey, fentanyl overdose.
- George Lilanga, 71, Tanzanian painter and sculptor, diabetes.
- Sakshi Ranga Rao, 62, Indian actor, kidney failure.
- Bhakti Tirtha Swami, 55, American spiritual guru, melanoma.
- John T. Walton, 58, American Vietnam War veteran and son of Wal-Mart founder Sam Walton, aircraft crash.

=== 28 ===
- Thomas D. Clark, 101, American historian.
- Dick Dietz, 63, American baseball player (San Francisco Giants, Los Angeles Dodgers, Atlanta Braves), heart attack.
- Oskar Gerber, 86, Swiss Olympic decathlete (1948).
- Frances Greer, 88, American soprano.
- Yumika Hayashi, 35, Japanese AV idol and pink film actress, choking.
- Philip Hobsbaum, 72, British academic, poet and critic, diabetes.
- Brenda Howard, 58, American LGBTQ-rights activist, colon cancer.
- Arthur Maimane, 72, South African journalist and novelist.
- Gyula Petrikovics, 62, Hungarian sprint canoer and Olympic silver medalist (1968).
- Rowland B. Wilson, 74, American cartoonist and animator.
- American military personnel killed in action during Operation Red Wings
  - Matthew Axelson, 29, American Navy SEAL.
  - Danny Dietz, 25, American Navy SEAL.
  - Erik S. Kristensen, 33, American Navy SEALs Lieutenant commander.
  - Michael P. Murphy, 29, American Navy SEAL officer.
  - Stephen C. Reich, 34, American soldier and Minor League Baseball player.

=== 29 ===
- Ruslan Abdulgani, 91, Indonesian politician and diplomat, stroke.
- James Gilbert Baker, 90, American astronomer.
- Gerard Clark Bond, 65, American geologist.
- John D. Burgess, 71, Scottish bagpiper.
- Jean-Paul Cook, 77, Canadian politician, member of the House of Commons of Canada (1962-1963).
- Mikkel Flagstad, 75, Norwegian jazz musician.
- Marc Freiberger, 76, American basketball player and Olympian (1952).
- Tymoteusz Karpowicz, 83, Polish language poet and playwright.
- Bruce Malmuth, 71, American film director (Nighthawks, Hard to Kill) and actor (The Karate Kid), throat cancer.
- Vincenzo Perruchon, 84, Italian cross-country skier and Olympian (1948, 1952).
- Frank Stanmore, 75, Australian rubgy league footballer.
- François-Xavier Verschave, 59, French economist, historian and writer, pancreatic cancer.

=== 30 ===
- Clancy Eccles, 64, Jamaican ska and reggae singer, songwriter, and record producer, heart attack.
- Christopher Fry, 97, British playwright.
- Miloslav Houzim, 64, Czech Olympic canoeist (1964).
- Lilian Keil, 88, American nurse, highly decorated World War II and Korean War flight nurse.
- Al Milnar, 91, American baseball player (Cleveland Indians, St. Louis Browns, Philadelphia Phillies).
- Éva Novák-Gerard, 75, Hungarian swimmer and Olympian (1948, 1952, 1956).
- Qigong, 92, Chinese calligrapher, painter, and sinologist.
- Alexei Sultanov, 35, Russian-American pianist, stroke.
- Robert Yount, 75, American country music singer and songwriter.
