= 1950 European Athletics Championships – Men's decathlon =

Men's decathlon at the European Athletics Championships

The men's decathlon at the 1950 European Athletics Championships was held in Brussels, Belgium, at Heysel Stadium on 24 and 25 August 1950.

== Medalists ==
Gold	Ignace Heinrich; France
Silver	Örn Clausen; Iceland
Bronze	Kjell Tånnander; Sweden

== Results ==
=== Final ===
24/25 August

The highest mark recorded in each event is highlighted in yellow

Rank	Name	Nationality	100m	LJ	SP	HJ	400m	110m H	DT	PV	JT	1500m	Points	Notes
1st place, gold medalist(s)	Ignace Heinrich	France	11.3	6.84	13.14	1.80	52.2	15.3	41.44	3.80	53.31	4:50.6	6827 (7364)	CR
2nd place, silver medalist(s)	Örn Clausen	Iceland	10.9	7.09	13.17	1.80	49.8	15.1	36.21	3.40	47.96	4:49.8	6819 (7297)	
3rd place, bronze medalist(s)	Kjell Tånnander	Sweden	11.3	6.87	13.54	1.86	53.1	16.0	41.00	3.70	50.00	4:57.8	6664 (7175)	
4	Göran Widenfelt	Sweden	11.5	6.65	12.29	1.96	52.9	16.4	36.20	3.60	50.41	4:36.0	6566 (7005)	
5	Armin Scheurer	Switzerland	11.9	6.83	12.00	1.80	53.9	16.3	37.04	4.30	53.26	4:57.6	6460 (6944)	
6	Vladimir Volkov	Soviet Union	11.2	6.61	12.28	1.65	50.8	16.3	36.43	3.50	54.78	4:36.2	6498 (6869)	
7	Edward Adamczyk	Poland	11.5	6.95	12.56	1.70	51.7	16.1	37.94	3.90	46.68	4:56.8	6447 (6861)	
8	Miloslav Moravec	Czechoslovakia	11.3	6.82	11.76	1.75	50.8	16.2	36.11	3.30	52.77	4:39.0	6482 (6824)	
9	Viktor Iyevlev	Soviet Union	11.9	6.74	12.30	1.80	54.7	16.5	34.95	3.60	59.75	4:44.0	6347 (6732)	
10	Pierre Sprecher	France	11.8	6.20	12.20	1.60	51.4	16.4	38.77	3.30	52.81	4:46.0	6107 (6394)	
11	Geoffrey Elliott	Great Britain	11.3	6.25	10.72	1.80	54.2	16.6	39.03	3.80	37.10	5:13.4	5900 (6237)	
12	Davorin Marčelja	Yugoslavia	12.0	6.28	12.40	1.60	53.4	17.3	36.73	3.60	54.96	4:55.0	5934 (6201)	
13	Oto Rebula	Yugoslavia	11.6	6.10	11.97	1.65	56.0	16.4	37.68	3.30	41.70	5:11.0	5630 (6030)	
14	John van Mullem	Belgium	12.1	6.25	10.57	1.75	56.2	17.4	28.40	3.40	34.30	5:31.0	5081 (5236)	
	Albert Dayer	Belgium	12.0	5.65	11.94								DNF	

== Participation ==
According to an unofficial count, 15 athletes from 10 countries participated in the event.

- Belgium (2)
- Czechoslovakia (1)
- France (2)
- Iceland (1)
- Poland (1)
- Soviet Union (2)
- Sweden (2)
- Switzerland (1)
- Great Britain (1)
- Yugoslavia (2)
