= Athletics at the 1948 Summer Olympics – Men's decathlon =

Men's decathlon at the Games of the XIV Olympiad
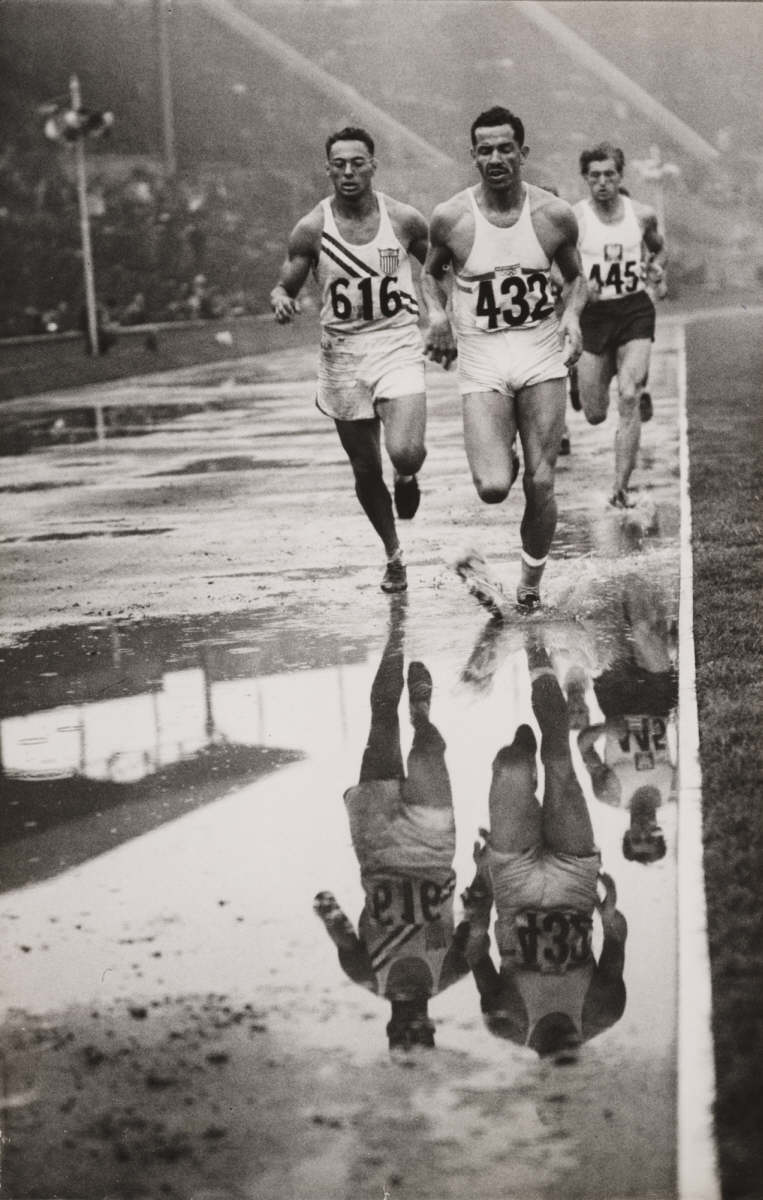
- Dates: August 5 & August 6, 1948

Medalists
1st place, gold medalist(s)		Bob Mathias	United States
2nd place, silver medalist(s)		Ignace Heinrich	France
3rd place, bronze medalist(s)		Floyd Simmons	United States

The men's decathlon event at the 1948 Olympic Games took place between August 5 and August 6. The 17-year-old Bob Mathias of the United States won with a points total of 7139.

== Competition format ==
The decathlon consists of ten track and field events, with a points system that awards higher scores for better results in each of the ten components. The athletes all compete in one competition with no elimination rounds.

== Schedule ==
All times are British Summer Time (UTC+1)

Date	Time	Round
Thursday, 5 August 1948	10:30; 11:30; 15:00; 16:00; 17:30	100 metres Long jump Shot put High jump 400 metres
Friday, 6 August 1948	10:30; 11:30; 14:30; 16:30; 18:30	110 metres hurdles Discus throw Pole vault Javelin throw 1500 metres

== Records ==
Prior to the competition, the existing World and Olympic records were as follows.

World record Olympic record	Glenn Morris (USA)	7900	Berlin, Germany	8 August 1936

== Overall results ==
Key

The highest mark recorded in each event is highlighted in yellow. Because there were ties in three events, including five for the high jump, these marks were split between twelve competitors with the gold medallist claiming two of them.

Key:	DNS	Did not start	DNF	Did not finish

Rank	Athlete	Overall points	100 m	LJ	SP	HJ	400 m	110 m H	DT	PV	JT	1500 m
1st place, gold medalist(s)	Bob Mathias (USA)	7139	787; 11.2 s	703; 6.615 m	719; 13.04 m	859; 1.86 m	780; 51.7 s	818; 15.7 s	769; 44.0 m	692; 3.5 m	593; 50.32 m	354; 5:11.0 min
2nd place, silver medalist(s)	Ignace Heinrich (FRA)	6974	760; 11.3 s	775; 6.895 m	701; 12.85 m	859; 1.86 m	785; 51.6 s	833; 15.6 s	739; 40.94 m	575; 3.2 m	430; 40.98 m	517; 4:43.8 min
3rd place, bronze medalist(s)	Floyd Simmons (USA)	6950	787; 11.2 s	731; 6.725 m	696; 12.8 m	859; 1.86 m	770; 51.9 s	896; 15.2 s	509; 32.73 m	652; 3.4 m	624; 51.99 m	426; 4:58.0 min
4	Enrique Kistenmacher (ARG)	6929	872; 10.9 s	825; 7.080 m	684; 12.67 m	671; 1.70 m	845; 50.5 s	736; 16.3 s	744; 41.11 m	575; 3.2 m	499; 45.06 m	478; 4:49.6 min
5	Erik Andersson (SWE)	6877	686; 11.6 s	698; 6.595 m	683; 12.66 m	727; 1.75 m	765; 52.0 s	790; 15.9 s	599; 36.07 m	733; 3.6 m	607; 51.04 m	589; 4:34.0 min
6	Peter Mullins (AUS)	6739	787; 11.2 s	711; 6.645 m	691; 12.75 m	822; 1.83 m	706; 53.2 s	896; 15.2 s	541; 33.94 m	652; 3.4 m	612; 51.32 m	321; 5:17.6 min
7	Per Axel Eriksson (SWE)	6731	618; 11.9 s	751; 6.80 m	617; 11.96 m	786; 1.80 m	740; 52.5 s	749; 16.2 s	567; 34.91 m	613; 3.3 m	715; 56.7 m	575; 4:35.8 min
8	Irving Mondschein (USA)	6715	760; 11.3 s	754; 6.810 m	690; 12.74 m	822; 1.83 m	785; 51.6 s	698; 16.6 s	674; 38.74 m	692; 3.5 m	363; 36.81 m	477; 4:49.8 min
9	Edward Adamczyk (POL)	6712	662; 11.7 s	825; 7.080 m	735; 13.2 m	727; 1.75 m	740; 52.5 s	804; 15.8 s	685; 39.11 m	652; 3.4 m	476; 43.7 m	406; 5:01.4 min
10	Godtfred Holmvang (NOR)	6663	576; 12.1 s	739; 6.75 m	637; 12.17 m	671; 1.7 m	720; 52.9 s	723; 16.4 s	656; 38.11 m	652; 3.4 m	656; 53.66 m	633; 4:28.6 min
11	Per Stavem (NOR)	6552	597; 12.0 s	726; 6.705 m	805; 13.89 m	786; 1.8 m	585; 56.0 s	723; 16.4 s	743; 41.06 m	575; 3.2 m	639; 52.79 m	373; 5:07.4 min
12	Örn Clausen (ISL)	6444	814; 11.1 s	686; 6.545 m	703; 12.87 m	786; 1.8 m	639; 54.7 s	776; 16.0 s	606; 36.34 m	575; 3.2 m	484; 44.16 m	375; 5:07.0 min
13	Yrjö Mäkelä (FIN)	6421	618; 11.9 s	603; 6.20 m	725; 13.10 m	786; 1.8 m	656; 54.3 s	597; 17.5 s	600; 36.12 m	575; 3.2 m	835; 62.55 m	426; 4:58.0 min
14	Pierre Sprécher (FRA)	6401	618; 11.9 s	646; 6.38 m	641; 12.22 m	563; 1.6 m	775; 51.8 s	686; 16.7 s	625; 37.02 m	501; 3.0 m	757; 58.79 m	589; 4:34.0 min
15	Kjell Tånnander (SWE)	6325	686; 11.6 s	695; 6.58 m	668; 12.5 m	859; 1.86 m	647; 54.5 s	723; 16.4 s	610; 36.5 m	575; 3.2 m	475; 43.65 m	387; 5:04.8 min
16	Wacław Kuźmicki (POL)	6153	597; 12.0 s	690; 6.565 m	652; 12.34 m	671; 1.7 m	656; 54.3 s	587; 17.6 s	655; 38.06 m	575; 3.2 m	539; 47.34 m	531; 4:41.8 min
17	Hannes Sonck (FIN)	6142	618; 11.9 s	728; 6.715 m	605; 11.83 m	727; 1.75 m	618; 55.2 s	674; 16.8 s	561; 34.71 m	652; 3.4 m	555; 48.24 m	404; 5:01.8 min
18	Davorin Marčelja (YUG)	6141	576; 12.1 s	568; 6.05 m	638; 12.19 m	671; 1.7 m	652; 54.4 s	597; 17.5 s	695; 39.44 m	613; 3.3 m	688; 55.34 m	443; 4:55.2 min
19	Witold Gerutto (POL)	6106	576; 12.1 s	534; 5.905 m	871; 14.53 m	671; 1.7 m	610; 55.4 s	651; 17.0 s	765; 41.8 m	501; 3.0 m	607; 51.06 m	320; 5:17.8 min
20	Hernán Figueroa (CHI)	6026	686; 11.6 s	651; 6.405 m	520; 10.87 m	859; 1.86 m	730; 52.7 s	640; 17.1 s	614; 36.62 m	575; 3.2 m	387; 38.31 m	364; 5:09.0 min
20	Hércules Azcune (URU)	6026	686; 11.6 s	656; 6.425 m	637; 12.17 m	671; 1.7 m	656; 54.3 s	710; 16.5 s	515; 32.98 m	652; 3.4 m	465; 43.05 m	378; 5:06.4 min
22	Jacques Crétaine (FRA)	5829	686; 11.6 s	656; 6.425 m	512; 10.78 m	616; 1.65 m	635; 54.8 s	618; 17.3 s	679; 38.9 m	652; 3.4 m	469; 43.26 m	306; 5:20.8 min
23	Fritz Nussbaum (SUI)	5808	618; 11.9 s	637; 6.345 m	533; 11.02 m	563; 1.6 m	687; 53.6 s	710; 16.5 s	530; 33.54 m	613; 3.3 m	518; 46.13 m	399; 5:02.6 min
24	Mario Recordón (CHI)	5730	640; 11.8 s	575; 6.085 m	571; 11.45 m	671; 1.7 m	674; 53.9 s	804; 15.8 s	536; 33.77 m	431; 2.8 m	383; 38.06 m	445; 4:54.8 min
25	Lionel Fournier (CAN)	5590	686; 11.6 s	678; 6.510 m	482; 10.42 m	616; 1.65 m	647; 54.5 s	607; 17.4 s	498; 32.31 m	575; 3.2 m	454; 42.39 m	347; 5:12.4 min
26	Albert Dayer (BEL)	5586	597; 12.0 s	516; 5.825 m	663; 12.45 m	616; 1.65 m	543; 57.1 s	422; 19.5 s	757; 41.54 m	501; 3.0 m	564; 48.71 m	407; 5:01.2 min
27	Oskar Gerber (SUI)	5558	618; 11.9 s	547; 5.96 m	585; 11.61 m	563; 1.6 m	635; 54.8 s	674; 16.8 s	551; 34.32 m	575; 3.2 m	455; 42.44 m	355; 5:10.8 min
28	Sayed Moukhtar (EGY)	5031	640; 11.8 s	448; 5.51 m	533; 11.02 m	462; 1.5 m	635; 54.8 s	557; 17.9 s	612; 36.54 m	285; 2.35 m	491; 44.59 m	368; 5:08.4 min
—N/a	Baldev Singh (IND)	DNF	640; 11.8 s	708; 6.63 m	451; 10.05 m	671; 1.7 m	543; 57.1 s	762; 16.1 s	430; 29.63 m	DNS	DNS	DNS
—N/a	Josef Seger (LIE)	DNF	536; 12.3 s	543; 5.945 m	398; 9.4 m	616; 1.65 m	597; 55.7 s	485; 18.7 s	404; 28.6 m	DNS	DNS	DNS
—N/a	Eduardo Julve (PER)	DNF	686; 11.6 s	716; 6.665 m	718; 13.03 m	616; 1.65 m	692; 53.5 s	DNS	DNS	DNS	DNS	DNS
—N/a	Oto Rebula (YUG)	DNF	686; 11.6 s	683; 6.53 m	580; 11.55 m	563; 1.6 m	614; 55.3 s	DNS	DNS	DNS	DNS	DNS
—N/a	René Kremer (LUX)	DNF	710; 11.5 s	615; 6.255 m	591; 11.67 m	563; 1.6 m	566; 56.5 s	DNS	DNS	DNS	DNS	DNS
—N/a	Gebhard Büchel (LIE)	DNF	464; 12.7 s	457; 5.55 m	477; 10.36 m	368; 1.4 m	DNS	DNS	DNS	DNS	DNS	DNS
—N/a	Armin Scheurer (SUI)	DNF	499; 12.5 s	DNS	DNS	DNS	DNS	DNS	DNS	DNS	DNS	DNS
—N/a	Rashad Khadr (EGY)	DNS	DNS	DNS	DNS	DNS	DNS	DNS	DNS	DNS	DNS	DNS
—N/a	Fernando Fernandes (POR)	DNS	DNS	DNS	DNS	DNS	DNS	DNS	DNS	DNS	DNS	DNS
