= 1954 European Athletics Championships – Men's decathlon =

Men's decathlon at the European Athletics Championships

The men's decathlon at the 1954 European Athletics Championships was held in Bern, Switzerland, at Stadion Neufeld on 26 and 27 August 1954.

== Medalists ==
Gold	Vasiliy Kuznetsov; Soviet Union
Silver	Torbjörn Lassenius; Finland
Bronze	Heinz Oberbeck; West Germany

== Results ==
=== Final ===
26/27 August

The highest mark recorded in each event is highlighted in yellow

Rank	Name	Nationality	100m	LJ	SP	HJ	400m	110m H	DT	PV	JT	1500m	Points	Notes
1st place, gold medalist(s)	Vasiliy Kuznetsov	Soviet Union	11.2	6.90	12.88	1.70	50.7	15.4	44.73	3.80	56.20	4:58.6	6881 (6752)	CR
2nd place, silver medalist(s)	Torbjörn Lassenius	Finland	11.7	6.52	12.29	1.80	51.9	15.6	35.81	3.60	64.93	4:39.2	6676 (6424)	
3rd place, bronze medalist(s)	Heinz Oberbeck	West Germany	11.2	7.36	13.41	1.80	51.6	16.5	40.62	3.50	52.55	5:35.2	6531 (6263)	
4	Yuriy Kutenko	Soviet Union	11.6	6.94	12.66	1.65	52.9	16.3	39.54	3.90	56.87	5:07.0	6442 (6097)	
5	Miloslav Moravec	Czechoslovakia	11.3	6.71	11.63	1.75	50.6	16.5	36.44	3.20	50.40	4:39.2	6371 (5953)	
6	Manfred Huber	Switzerland	11.6	6.40	10.99	1.70	50.9	16.0	32.40	3.20	51.14	4:22.2	6240 (5813)	
7	Friedel Schirmer	West Germany	11.6	6.13	12.88	1.65	52.1	16.0	35.53	3.10	59.40	4:47.6	6199 (5750)	
8	Arnulf Pilhatsch	Austria	11.6	6.44	13.75	1.86	55.5	15.7	35.81	3.20	51.72	5:07.8	6188 (5725)	
9	Fritz Vogelsang	Switzerland	11.5	6.14	11.52	1.65	51.6	16.2	35.79	3.60	44.40	4:35.2	6127 (5670)	
10	Stojan Slavkov	Bulgaria	11.7	6.61	11.38	1.86	52.5	16.5	35.46	3.60	39.65	4:50.4	6118 (5645)	NR
11	Jacques Guénard	France	11.7	5.95	11.48	1.75	53.5	16.4	32.29	3.50	58.09	4:51.6	6026 (5517)	
12	Stanislav Štefkovič	Czechoslovakia	12.1	6.26	12.49	1.75	54.2	17.7	36.29	3.50	45.46	4:32.6	5929 (5401)	
13	Hans Baar	Saar	12.0	6.17	13.29	1.65	53.7	16.3	35.06	3.20	39.68	4:39.2	5830 (5266)	NR
14	Gheorghe Zîmbresteanu	Romania	11.5	6.30	11.54	1.65	51.6	16.2	36.49	3.40	37.57	?	5316 (5250)	
15	Fernando Fernandes	Portugal	11.5	6.54	10.17	1.70	51.5	16.8	33.34	3.10	38.64	4:50.4	5761 (5147)	
	Raimund Hoop	Liechtenstein	12.3	5.78	10.50	1.60	54.8	19.6	31.53				DNF	
	Lucien Verhees	Belgium	11.6	6.53	11.31	1.75	51.0						DNF	
	Per Axel Eriksson	Sweden	11.7	6.79	11.73								DNF	
	Josef Hoop	Liechtenstein	11.5	5.48	9.96								DNF	

== Participation ==
According to an unofficial count, 19 athletes from 14 countries participated in the event.

- Austria (1)
- Belgium (1)
- Bulgaria (1)
- Czechoslovakia (2)
- Finland (1)
- France (1)
- Liechtenstein (2)
- Portugal (1)
- Romania (1)
- Saar (1)
- Soviet Union (2)
- Sweden (1)
- Switzerland (2)
- West Germany (2)
