= Vladimir Volkov =

Vladimir Volkov may refer to:

- Vladimir Volkov (athlete) (1921–1986), Russian decathlete
- Vladimir Volkov (politician) (born 1954), Russian politician
- Vladimir Volkov (footballer) (born 1986), Montenegrin footballer

== See also ==
- Vladimir Volkoff (1932–2005), French writer
