= Stanislav Štefkovič =

Slovak decathlete (1929–2023

Personal information
- Born: 21 November 1929 Skačany, Czechoslovakia
- Died: 22 February 2023 (aged 93) Nitra, Slovakia

Sport
- Country: Czechoslovakia
- Sport: Athletics
- Event: Decathlon

Stanislav Štefkovič (21 November 1929 – 22 February 2023) was a Slovak decathlete.

Štefkovič was born in the village of Skačany. From his early childhood, he was interested in sports - first football and volleyball and, later, athletics. He was educated at a grammar school in Trenčín and studied Physical Education at the Comenius University. In the early phase of his athletic career, his weakest discipline was pole vault. Nonetheless, after reading a book by the Soviet athlete Nikolay Ozolin, his performance improved and he set a Slovak pole vaulting record 12 times in a row.

In 1953, Štefkovič finished third in the Czechoslovak Athletic Championship. In 1954, he competed at the Summer Universiade in Budapest and 1954 European Athletics Championships. In 1957, he settled in Nitra, where he taught and coached Athletics at the Slovak University of Agriculture. He competed at the Summer Universiade in Paris in the same year. A back injury suffered while skiing made it impossible for Štefkovič to compete internationally. In 1995, Štefkovič was awarded an Honorary Award for promotion of Fair Play in sports by the Slovak Olympic and Sports Committee. The Slovak Athletic Federation included him in the Hall of Fame of Slovak Athletics in 2022.

Štefkovič died in Nitra on 22 February 2023, at the age of 93.
