= Erik Andersson (athlete) =

Swedish decathlete

Personal information
- Nationality: Swedish
- Born: 26 December 1921 Mannheim, Weimar Republic
- Died: 31 July 2002 (aged 80) Geisenheim, West Germany

Sport
- Sport: Athletics
- Event: Decathlon

Erik Andersson (26 December 1921 – 31 July 2002) was a Swedish athlete. He competed in the men's decathlon at the 1948 Summer Olympics.
