= Floyd Simmons =

American athlete and actor (1923–2008)

Personal information
- Born: April 10, 1923 Charlotte, North Carolina, U.S.
- Died: April 1, 2008 (aged 84) Charlotte, North Carolina, U.S.
Medal record
Men's athletics
Representing the United States
Olympic Games
Bronze medal – third place	1948 London	Decathlon
Bronze medal – third place	1952 Helsinki	Decathlon

Floyd Macon Simmons (April 10, 1923 – April 1, 2008) was an American athlete and actor who competed mainly in the Olympics decathlon in 1948 and 1952 winning bronze at both Olympic Games. He was born in Charlotte, North Carolina.

== Biography ==
Born and raised in Charlotte, North Carolina, Simmons was the son of a builder and former football coach of Davidson College. He was nicknamed "Chunk" by his mother as he was her "little chunk of love". Simmons played football and ran track for Central High School in Charlotte, where he graduated in 1942. In track, he was a two-time NCHSAA state champion in the 120 yard hurdles, winning in 1941 and 1942.

In college, Simmons was an All-American hurdler for the North Carolina Tar Heels track and field team, qualifying for the finals in the 220 yards hurdles at the 1946 NCAA track and field championships.

During World War II he served with the 10th Mountain Division, which he personally requested to be a part of. He was wounded in Italy and received a Purple Heart award.

He competed for the United States in the 1948 Summer Olympics held in London, England in the decathlon where he won the bronze medal. He repeated this feat four years later in the 1952 Summer Olympics held in Helsinki, Finland, where he again won the bronze medal.

"I chose 10 events and not just one pigeonhole, I didn’t want to do just high hurdles or the shot. I wanted to do it all. I suppose I still do."

In addition to competing in sports Simmons was contracted to Universal Pictures alongside Rock Hudson and John Gavin. Simmons guest starred in many television shows and appeared in over a dozen films most memorably in South Pacific (1958). He was considered for the role of Brick in the film version of Cat on a Hot Tin Roof. as Allan Quatermain in Watusi and was signed to play Mr. Roberts in a Joshua Logan television series of the same name that was unmade.

In 1956, he played Agent Harris in "Outside the Law," and Lt. Hammond in the movie, "Pillars of the Sky." He appeared as Bob Wentworth in "For Money or Love" on "The Gale Storm Show: Oh! Susannah," a comedy which aired on November 16, 1957. Simmons was an Army Sergeant in "The Deadly Mantis," a 1957 horror/science fiction movie. Larry Bell was the character he played in "The Tattered Dress," another 1957 movie. Simmons played the Ghost of Mathew Maulle, in a show entitled "The House of the Seven Gables, a part of the series "Twice Told Tales."

After returning to Charlotte, he had a photography business and painted as a hobby.

Simmons continued to compete in Masters athletics into his 80s. He died on April 1, 2008, in Charlotte, North Carolina, at the age of 84.

He was posthumously inducted into the North Carolina High School Track and Field and Cross Country Hall of Fame on January 6, 2026.
