= Reinaldo Oliver =

Puerto Rican athlete

Reinaldo Luis Oliver Martínez (28 March 1932 in Ponce, Puerto Rico – 19 January 2015 in San Juan, Puerto Rico) was a Puerto Rican javelin thrower and decathlete who competed in the 1952 Summer Olympics and in the 1956 Summer Olympics. He won the bronze medal in the javelin at the 1955 Pan American Games. He was also a baseball player, and played at the Triple-A level for 18 games in 1961, with the San Juan/Charleston Marlins.

== International competitions ==
Year	Competition	Venue	Position	Event	Notes
Representing Puerto Rico
1950	Central American and Caribbean Games	Guatemala City, Guatemala	4th	Javelin throw (old)	53.63 m
1950	Central American and Caribbean Games	Guatemala City, Guatemala	8th	Pentathlon	2436 pts
1952	Olympic Games	Helsinki, Finland	25th (q)	Javelin throw (old)	52.40 m
1952	Olympic Games	Helsinki, Finland	21st	Decathlon	5228 pts
1954	Central American and Caribbean Games	Mexico City, Mexico	9th	Discus throw	35.68 m
1954	Central American and Caribbean Games	Mexico City, Mexico	1st	Javelin throw (old)	67.71 m
1954	Central American and Caribbean Games	Mexico City, Mexico	3rd	Pentathlon	2494 pts
1955	Pan American Games	Mexico City, Mexico	3rd	Javelin throw (old)	65.56 m
1956	Olympic Games	Melbourne, Australia	19th (q)	Javelin throw (old)	63.68 m

== Personal bests ==
- Javelin throw (old model) – 71.22 metres (1956)
- Decathlon – 5896 points (1952)
