= Torbjörn Lassenius =

Finnish decathlete

Personal information
- Nationality: Finnish
- Born: 4 August 1931 (age 94) Helsinki, Finland

Sport
- Sport: Athletics
- Event: Decathlon
Medal record
Men's athletics
Representing Finland
European Championships
Silver medal – second place	1954 Bern	Decathlon

Torbjörn Lassenius (born 4 August 1931) is a Finnish athlete. He competed in the men's decathlon at the 1956 Summer Olympics.
