= 1946 European Athletics Championships – Men's decathlon =

Men's decathlon at the European Athletics Championships

The men's decathlon at the 1946 European Athletics Championships was held in Oslo, Norway, at Bislett Stadion on 23 and 24 August 1946.

== Medalists ==
Gold	Godtfred Holmvang; Norway
Silver	Sergey Kuznetsov; Soviet Union
Bronze	Göran Waxberg; Sweden

== Results ==
=== Final ===
23/24 August

The highest mark recorded in each event is highlighted in yellow

Rank	Name	Nationality	100m	LJ	SP	HJ	400m	110m H	DT	PV	JT	1500m	Points	Notes
1st place, gold medalist(s)	Godtfred Holmvang	Norway	11.7	6.69	12.32	1.78	52.7	16.2	36.86	3.60	51.06	4:15.8	6566 (6987)	
2nd place, silver medalist(s)	Sergey Kuznetsov	Soviet Union	11.1	7.37	11.84	1.60	51.9	16.4	37.02	3.70	48.39	4:33.8	6559 (6930)	
3rd place, bronze medalist(s)	Göran Waxberg	Sweden	11.8	6.75	12.23	1.75	53.4	16.7	37.94	3.50	50.73	4:34.4	6313 (6661)	
4	Armin Scheurer	Switzerland	11.6	6.08	11.76	1.81	52.5	16.4	36.15	3.90	51.49	4:53.0	6263 (6655)	
5	Pierre Sprecher	France	12.0	6.25	12.11	1.60	50.9	16.6	36.37	3.10	56.64	4:19.8	6203 (6496)	
6	Oskar Hafliger	Switzerland	11.7	6.54	11.43	1.66	51.2	16.8	39.78	3.00	49.90	4:27.2	6195 (6461)	
7	Gunnar Erdal-Aase	Norway	11.8	6.44	12.28	1.63	53.2	18.8	36.44	3.40	57.06	4:34.2	5995 (6295)	
8	István Kiss	Hungary	11.8	6.55	11.07	1.75	54.6	16.7	33.43	3.40	48.26	5:03.8	5817 (6027)	
9	Davorin Marčelja	Yugoslavia	12.2	6.32	12.47	1.66	54.0	17.4	38.92	3.00	51.65	4:55.6	5762 (5994)	
10	Wacław Kuźmicki	Poland	12.0	6.51	11.73	1.72	54.9	18.8	38.09	3.10	41.89	4:45.8	5602 (5811)	
11	Armando Ossena	Italy	11.9	6.70	11.18	1.60	54.3	16.6	37.91	2.80	49.49	5:16.0	5634 (5796)	
12	Marjan Urbic	Yugoslavia	11.8	6.45	10.34	1.66	54.2	17.3	29.79	3.10	51.51	4:51.2	5605 (5738)	
	Gebhard Büchel	Liechtenstein	12.3	5.45	10.72	1.55	57.0	18.4	28.92	2.70	53.68		DNF	
	René Kremer	Luxembourg	11.2	6.48	12.04	1.60	54.1	17.2	37.77				DNF	
	Witold Gerutto	Poland	11.5	5.79	13.99	1.72	54.3	DNF					DNF	
	Erik Peter Andersson	Sweden	DNF										DNF	

== Participation ==
According to an unofficial count, 16 athletes from 11 countries participated in the event.

- France (1)
- Hungary (1)
- Italy (1)
- Liechtenstein (1)
- Luxembourg (1)
- Norway (2)
- Poland (2)
- Soviet Union (1)
- Sweden (2)
- Switzerland (2)
- Yugoslavia (2)
