= The Bob Mathias Story =

1954 film by Francis D. Lyon

- Directed by: Francis D. Lyon
- Written by: Richard Collins
- Produced by: William E. Selwyn; James L. Fallon
- Starring: Bob Mathias; Ward Bond; Melba Mathias
- Cinematography: Ellsworth Fredericks
- Edited by: Walter Hannemann
- Music by: Leith Stevens
- Production company: Mathlon Productiosn
- Distributed by: Allied Artists Pictures
- Release date: October 24, 1954
- Running time: 80 minutes
- Country: United States
- Language: English
- Budget: $180,000

The Bob Mathias Story is a 1954 American sports drama film directed by Francis D. Lyon and starring Bob Mathias and Ward Bond. The story of Bob Mathias (portraying himself), the first man to win two consecutive Olympic Gold Medals in the Decathlon in London in 1948 and in Helsinki in 1952. His wife Melba appeared as herself. The film utilized extensive footage of the London and Helsinki Games, including actual footage of Mathias' triumphs. It was produced and distributed by Allied Artists and was marketed as being similar to other biopics The Stratton Story and The Glenn Miller Story.

== Cast ==
- Bob Mathias as Bob Mathias
- Ward Bond as Coach Jackson
- Melba Mathias as Melba Mathias
- Howard Petrie as Dr. Charles Mathias
- Ann Doran as Mrs. Lillian Mathias
- Diane Jergens as Pat Mathias
- Paul Bryar as Bill Andrews
- Anne Kimbell as Sally
- Harry Lauter as Irving Mondschein

== Production ==
Mathias was given a deferrment from the Marine Corps to appear in the movie. Forty precent of finance came from 75 citizens of Mathias' hometown of Tulare, California, raised in part by James Fallon who set up Mathlon Productions to make the movie. The balance came from Chemical Bank '& Trust Co. of N.Y.

In May 1954 Allied Artists agreed to distribute. The film was shot in May 1954 over two weeks in Hollywood and Tulare. Mathias said, "Director Francis Lyon told me ‘just be yourself’ and the rest was easy.”

== Reception ==
Variety called it a "good family programmer".

The film was not a financial success and only returned 60% of its cost.

== See also ==
- List of films about the sport of athletics
