= Yrjö Mäkelä =

Finnish decathlete

Personal information
- Nationality: Finnish
- Born: 2 December 1926 Helsinki, Finland
- Died: 23 May 2015 (aged 88) Espoo, Finland

Sport
- Sport: Athletics
- Event: Decathlon

Yrjö Mäkelä (2 December 1926 – 23 May 2015) was a Finnish athlete. He competed in the men's decathlon at the 1948 Summer Olympics.
