= Josef Hipp =

German decathlete

Personal information
- Nationality: German
- Born: 13 February 1927
- Died: 21 January 1959 (aged 31)

Sport
- Sport: Athletics
- Events: Discus throw Decathlon

Josef Hipp (13 February 1927 – 21 January 1959) was a German athlete. He competed in the men's discus throw and the men's decathlon at the 1952 Summer Olympics.
