= Erkki Hautamäki =

Finnish historian and athlete (1930–2023)

- Born: 28 August 1930; Lapua, Finland
- Died: 5 September 2023 (aged 93); Äänekoski, Finland
- Occupations: Military, history
- Known for: Suomi myrskyn silmässä - "Finland in the Eye of a Storm"

Erkki Hautamäki (28 August 1930 – 5 September 2023) was a Finnish councillor of education ("opetusneuvos"), a Major in the Finnish Defense Forces reserves, historian and a researcher of the history of the Finnish Wars during World War II and the Soviet war plans related to World War II. He competed in the men's decathlon at the 1952 Summer Olympics.

== Career ==
In the 1960s, Hautamäki served in a special task force at the Main Headquarters of the Finnish Defense Forces. From 1970 to 1990 Hautamäki served as the headmaster of Vuokatin Urheiluopisto, the Sports Educational Center of Vuokatti, in Eastern Finland. Hautamäki published the book Suomi myrskyn silmässä (Finland in the Eye of a Storm), in 2005, in which both the pre-Winter War and the post-Winter War Soviet invasion plans on Finland are discussed and analyzed in detail. The Swedish version of Hautamäki’s book was examined by scientists at the University of Uppsala, Sweden. The book's introduction was co-written by Colonel, M.A. Erkki Nordberg. Until his retirement in 2006, Nordberg served as the Chief of the Department of Education at the Main Headquarters of the Finnish Defense Forces. Professor Kent Zetterberg, a teacher at the Royal Swedish Academy of War Sciences, was the second writer.

== Death ==
Erkki Hautamäki died on 5 September 2023, at the age of 93.

== Works ==
- Suomi myrskyn silmässä - "Finland in the Eye of a Storm" -, 2005 (In Swedish: Finland i stormens öga, 2004)
