= Hugues Frayer =

French hurdler

Personal information
- Nationality: French
- Born: 31 January 1923 Paris, France
- Died: 28 April 1996 (aged 73)

Sport
- Sport: Track and field
- Events: 110 metres hurdles Decathlon

Hugues Frayer (31 January 1923 – 28 April 1996) was a French hurdler. He competed in the men's 110 metres hurdles at the 1948 Summer Olympics and the men's decathlon at the 1952 Summer Olympics.
