= Brígido Iriarte =

Venezuelan athlete (1921–1984)

Medal record

Men's athletics

Representing Venezuela

Bolivarian Games
Gold medal – first place	1951 Caracas	Pentathlon
Silver medal – second place	1961 Barranquilla	Pole vault

Héctor E. Brígido Iriarte (1 June 1921 – 4 January 1984) was a Venezuelan track and field athlete who competed in the 1952 Summer Olympics. He competed in a wide variety of events, including the decathlon, men's athletics pentathlon, pole vault, long jump and javelin throw. He finished fourth in the 1955 Pan American Games decathlon, fifth in the javelin throw, and sixth in the pole vault. In the 1959 Pan American Games he finished sixth in the javelin throw and eighth in the pole vault.

Brígido Iriarte Stadium in Caracas is named in his honour.

== Personal bests ==
- Decathlon – 6368 pts (1954)

== International competitions ==
Year	Competition	Venue	Position	Event	Notes
Representing Venezuela
1951	Bolivarian Games	Caracas, Venezuela	1st	Pentathlon	3115 pts
1952	Olympic Games	Helsinki, Finland	20th (q)	Long jump	6.82 m
1952	Olympic Games	Helsinki, Finland	26th (q)	Javelin throw	52.13 m
1952	Olympic Games	Helsinki, Finland	12th	Decathlon	5770 pts
1954	Central American and Caribbean Games	Mexico City, Mexico	3rd	Pole vault	3.90 m
1954	Central American and Caribbean Games	Mexico City, Mexico	14th	Triple jump	12.80 m
1954	Central American and Caribbean Games	Mexico City, Mexico	4th	Discus throw	38.69 m
1954	Central American and Caribbean Games	Mexico City, Mexico	10th	Javelin throw	50.13 m
1954	Central American and Caribbean Games	Mexico City, Mexico	1st	Pentathlon	2748 pts
1954	South American Championships	São Paulo, Brazil	1st	Pole vault	3.90 m
1954	South American Championships	São Paulo, Brazil	2nd	Decathlon	6002 pts
1955	Pan American Games	Mexico City, Mexico	6th	Pole vault	3.60 m
1955	Pan American Games	Mexico City, Mexico	5th	Javelin throw	56.29 m
1955	Pan American Games	Mexico City, Mexico	4th	Decathlon	5253 pts
1959	Central American and Caribbean Games	Caracas, Venezuela	4th	Pole vault	3.79 m
1959	Central American and Caribbean Games	Caracas, Venezuela	–	Pentathlon	DNF
1959	Pan American Games	Chicago, United States	8th	Pole vault	3.80 m
1959	Pan American Games	Chicago, United States	6th	Javelin throw	53.02 m
1960	Ibero-American Games	Santiago, Chile	10th	Pole vault	3.70 m
1961	South American Championships	Lima, Peru	3rd	Pole vault	3.80 m
1961	Bolivarian Games	Barranquilla, Colombia	2nd	Pole vault	3.70 m
1962	Central American and Caribbean Games	Kingston, Jamaica	4th	Pole vault	3.81 m
1962	Ibero-American Games	Madrid, Spain	9th	Pole vault	3.70 m
1965	South American Championships	Rio de Janeiro, Brazil	–	Decathlon	DNF
