= Jacques Crétaine =

French decathlete

Jacques Cretaine
Personal information
- Nationality: French
- Born: 16 June 1917; Saint-Marcel-d'Ardèche, France
- Died: 5 July 2003 (aged 86); Lyon, France

Sport
- Sport: Athletics
- Event: Decathlon

Jacques Cretaine (16 June 1917 – 5 July 2003) was a French athlete. He competed in the men's decathlon at the 1948 Summer Olympics.
