= Bob Mathias =

American decathlete and politician (1930–2006)

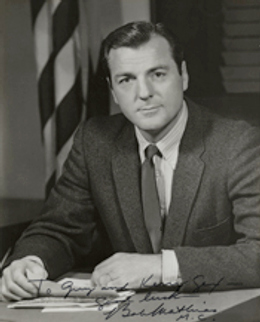
- Congressional portrait circa 1967–1974

Member of the U.S. House of Representatives from California's 18th district
- In office January 3, 1967 – January 3, 1975
- Preceded by: Harlan Hagen
- Succeeded by: William M. Ketchum

Personal details
- Born: Robert Bruce Mathias; November 17, 1930 Tulare, California, U.S.
- Died: September 2, 2006 (aged 75) Fresno, California, U.S.
- Party: Republican
- Spouse(s): Melba Mathias (1954–1976); Gwen Haven Alexander (1977–2006)
- Education: Stanford University (BA)
- Sports career
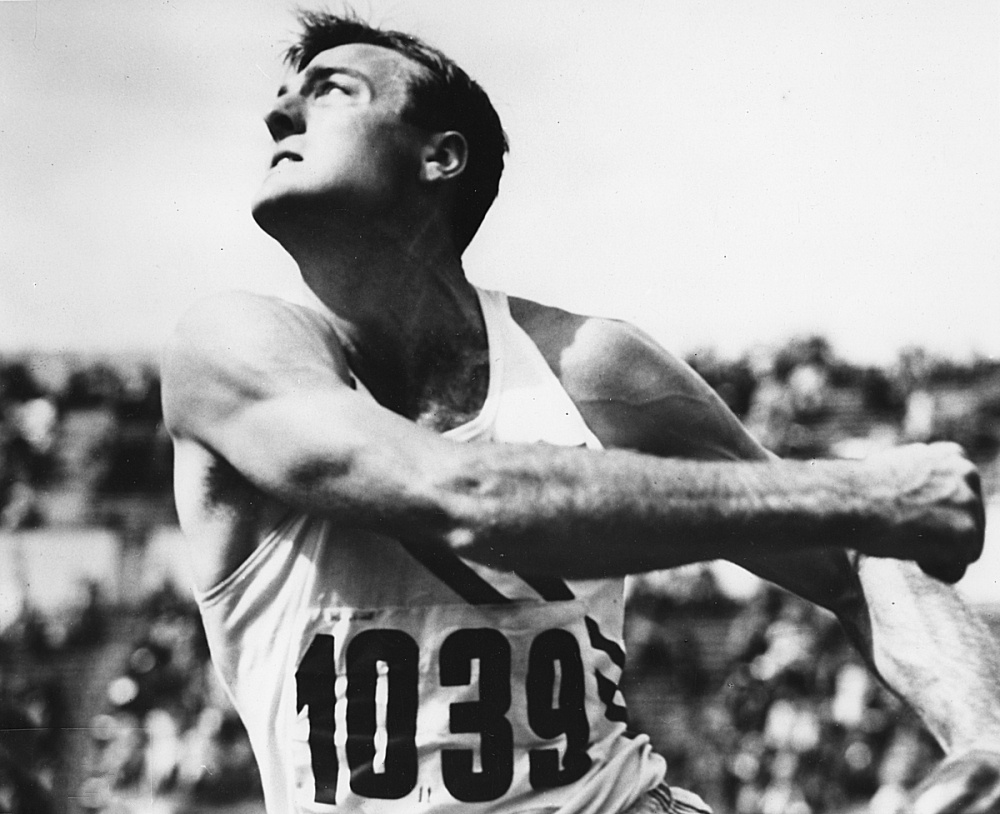
- Mathias at the 1952 Summer Olympics
- Height: 6 ft 3 in (190 cm)
- Weight: 203 lb (92 kg)
- Sport: Athletics
- Event: Decathlon
- Club: Olympic Club, San Francisco; Stanford Cardinal
Medal record
Men's athletics
Representing the United States
Olympic Games
Gold medal – first place	1948 London	Decathlon
Gold medal – first place	1952 Helsinki	Decathlon

Robert Bruce Mathias (November 17, 1930 – September 2, 2006) was an American decathlete, politician, and actor. Representing the United States, he won two Olympic gold medals in the Decathlon, at the 1948 and the 1952 Summer Games. As a Republican, he served in the U.S. House of Representatives for California's 18th congressional district, for four terms from 1967 to 1975.

== Early life and athletic career ==
Mathias was born in Tulare, California, to a family with partial Greek lineage. He attended Tulare Union High School, where he was a classmate and long time friend of Sim Iness, the 1952 Olympic discus gold medalist. While at Tulare Union in early 1948, Mathias took up the decathlon at the suggestion of his track coach, Virgil Jackson. During the summer following his high school graduation, he qualified for the United States Olympic team for the 1948 Summer Olympics held in London.

In the Olympics, Mathias's naïveté about the decathlon was exposed. He was unaware of the rules in the shot put and nearly fouled out of the event. He almost failed in the high jump but was able to recover. Mathias overcame his difficulties and with superior pole vault and javelin scores was able to push past Ignace Heinrich to win the Olympic gold medal. At age 17, he became the youngest gold medalist in a track and field event.

Mathias continued to succeed in decathlons in the four years between the London games and the 1952 Summer Olympics in Helsinki. In 1948, Mathias won the James E. Sullivan Award as the nation's top amateur athlete, but because his scholastic record in high school did not match his athletic achievement, he spent a year at The Kiski School, a well-respected all-boys boarding school in Saltsburg, Pennsylvania. He then entered Stanford University in 1949, played college football for two years and was a member of Phi Gamma Delta fraternity. Mathias set his first decathlon world record in 1950 and led Stanford to a Rose Bowl appearance in 1952, the first nationally televised college football game.

At Helsinki in 1952, Mathias established himself as one of the world's greatest all-around athletes. He won the decathlon by the astounding margin of 912 points, which established a new world record, and he became the first person to successfully defend an Olympic decathlon title. He returned to the United States as a national hero. His 7,887 point total at the Helsinki Olympics remained the school record at Stanford for 63 years until it was broken in 2015 by a freshman, Harrison Williams. In 1952, he was the first person to compete in an Olympics and a Rose Bowl the same year.

After the 1952 Olympics, Mathias retired from athletic competition.

== Post college ==
After graduating from Stanford in 1953 with a BA in education, Mathias spent two and a half years in the U.S. Marine Corps. He was promoted to the rank of captain and was honorably discharged.

He later became the first director of the United States Olympic Training Center, a post he held from 1977 to 1983.

He and his wife Melba can be seen on the edition of April 29, 1954, of You Bet Your Life. During the discussion he mentions a forthcoming film in which the couple played themselves, called The Bob Mathias Story. He also starred in a number of mostly cameo-type roles in a variety of movies and TV shows throughout the 1950s. In the 1959–1960 television season, Mathias played Frank Dugan, with costars Keenan Wynn as Kodiak and Chet Allen as Slats, in the TV series The Troubleshooters, which featured 26 episodes on events at construction sites. In 1960, he also appeared as an athletic Theseus in an Italian "peplum," or sword-and-sandal, film: Minotaur, the Wild Beast of Crete.

== Political career ==
Between 1967 and 1975, Mathias served four terms in the United States House of Representatives as a Republican, representing the northern San Joaquin Valley of California. (These were the same eight years in which Ronald Reagan served two terms as governor of California.) He defeated Harlan Hagen, the 14-year Democratic Party incumbent, by about 11% in the 1966 election. This was not too surprising because this area started to move away from its New Deal Democratic roots. But, like most Republicans and Democrats from California, he continued his predecessor's support of Civil Rights by voting in favor of the Civil Rights Act of 1968.

Mathias was re-elected three times without serious difficulty, but in 1974, his Congressional district was significantly redrawn in a mid-decade state redistricting plan. Renumbered as the 17th, Mathias's district acquired a large section of Fresno while losing several rural areas. Mathias was narrowly defeated for re-election by John Hans Krebs, a member of the Fresno County Board of Supervisors. Mathias was one of several Republicans swept out of office in the wake of the Watergate scandal.

From June to August 1975, Mathias served as the deputy director of the Selective Service. Mathias was also a regional director in the unsuccessful 1976 presidential election campaign of Gerald Ford.

== Death ==
Bob Mathias was diagnosed with cancer in 1996, and died from it in Fresno, California on September 2, 2006, at age 75. He is interred at Tulare Cemetery in Tulare, California. He was survived by wife Gwen, daughters Romel, Megan, Marissa, stepdaughter Alyse Alexander, son Reiner, brothers Eugene and Jim, and sister Patricia Guerrero.

== Timeline ==
Year	Comment
November 17, 1930	Bob Mathias was born, the second of four children (including older brother Eugene, younger brother James, and younger sister Patricia), to Dr. Charles and Lillian Mathias.
1948	At age seventeen, graduated from Tulare high school after an illustrious high school athletic career in football and track and field. Wins National Decathlon Championship at Bloomfield, N.J. According to the movie (starring himself and his wife), "The Bob Mathias Story", he actually did not have enough credits to graduate from high school, after concentrating solely on all the events of the decathlon- and get into Stanford, so his parents sent him to a prep school out of town where he could make up his academic shortcomings and get into college, as he wanted to be a doctor like his father and older brother Eugene. He qualified for the U.S. Olympic Team and went on to win gold medal in decathlon at the Summer Olympic Games in London, England. After huge celebration and parade in Tulare, presented with "Key to the City" by Mayor Elmo Zumwalt. Enrolls at Kiskiminetas Prep School, Saltsburg, Pa. Honored with the James E. Sullivan Award, presented each year to America's top amateur athlete.
1949	Won National Decathlon Championship at meet held in Tulare. Enrolled at Stanford University, where he starred in track and field and in gridiron football.
1950	Won National Decathlon Championship at a meet held in Tulare.
1951	Mathias played football during junior and senior years at Stanford. In the University of Southern California vs. Stanford football game, Mathias returned U.S.C.'s Frank Gifford's kick-off 96 yards for a touchdown. Spent the summer at U.S. Marine Corps boot camp in San Diego, California.
1952	On New Year's Day, he played fullback for Stanford University in the Rose Bowl. Won the National Decathlon Championship and Olympic Trials at meet held in Tulare. Won the Olympic gold medal in the decathlon at Helsinki, Finland, setting a |world record.
1953	Graduated from Stanford and commissioned as a 2nd Lt in the U.S. Marine Corps. Drafted by the Washington Redskins, though he never played in National Football League.
1954	Married his first wife Melba. They later had three daughters, Romel, Megan, and Marissa. Mathias and his wife starred in the movie The Bob Mathias Story. Entered active duty in the Marine Corps as a second lieutenant.
1954–56	Visited more than forty countries as America's Good Will Ambassador.
1956–60	Continued work for the state department as a good will ambassador to the world. Acting career took off, employed by John Wayne's Batjac Productions. Starred in the movie China Doll, the TV series The Troubleshooters, the movie Theseus and the Minotaur and in the movie It Happened in Athens.
1966	Elected to the U.S. House of Representatives as a Republican, serving four two-year terms.
1974	Lost his re-election for fifth term. Inducted into the National Track and Field Hall of Fame
1976	Mathias and Melba are divorced.
1977	Appointed director of U.S. Olympic Training Center in Colorado Springs. Bob and Gwen Haven Alexander married. Gwen has one daughter, Alyse Haven (1968–2014), from a prior marriage to Bill Alexander, former U.S. Congressman. On Tuesday, September 14, 1999, Alyse's three children died in a house fire believed to be intentionally set by the children's father. Bob also has a son Reiner from a prior relationship. Tulare high school stadium renamed Bob Mathias Stadium on November 10.
1983	Appointed executive director of the National Fitness Foundation. Inducted into the U.S. Olympic Hall of Fame
1988	Returned to the Central Valley, in rural Fresno County.
1996	Olympian Sim Iness died. He was Mathias's high school classmate and teammate at the 1952 Olympics. Doctors discovered a cancerous tumor in Mathias's throat.
June 6, 1998	A tribute dinner honoring Mathias on the 50th anniversary of his first Olympic medal was held in Tulare. More than 300 people from throughout the state attended, including Olympic medal-winners Sammy Lee, Bill Toomey, Dave Johnson and Pat McCormick, and Sim Iness' widow, Dolores.

== Personal bests ==
Information from World Athletics profile unless otherwise noted.

As of May 23, 2024

Event	Performance	Location	Date	Points
Decathlon	7,592 points	Helsinki	July 26, 1952	7,592 points
100 meters	10.9h	Helsinki	July 25, 1952	883 points
Long jump	6.98 m (22 ft 10 3/4 in)	Helsinki	July 25, 1952	809 points
Shot put	15.49 m (50 ft 9 3/4 in)	Fresno	May 9, 1953	820 points
High jump	1.90 m (6 ft 2 3/4 in)	Helsinki	July 25, 1952	714 points
400 meters	50.2h	Helsinki	July 25, 1952	805 points
110 meters hurdles	13.8h	Zürich	August 12, 1952	1,000 points
Discus throw	46.89 m (153 ft 10 in)	Helsinki	July 26, 1952	806 points
Pole vault	4.00 m (13 ft 1 1/4 in)	Helsinki	July 26, 1952	617 points
Javelin throw	59.21 m (194 ft 3 in)	Helsinki	July 26, 1952	726 points
1500 meters	4:50.8h	Helsinki	July 26, 1952	618 points
Virtual Best Performance				7,798 points

== Filmography ==
Year	Title	Role	Notes
1954	The Bob Mathias Story	Himself	
1958	China Doll	Capt. Phil Gates	
1960	Minotaur, the Wild Beast of Crete	Theseus	
1962	It Happened in Athens	Coach Graham	(final film role)

== Electoral history ==
1966 United States House of Representatives elections in California
Party	Candidate	Votes	%
Republican	Bob Mathias	96,699	55.9
Democratic	Harlan Hagen (incumbent)	76,346	44.1
Total votes		173,045	100.0
Turnout			
Republican gain from Democratic			

1968 United States House of Representatives elections in California
Party	Candidate	Votes	%
Republican	Bob Mathias (incumbent)	100,008	65.2
Democratic	Harlan Hagen	51,274	33.4
American Independent	Edward Calvin Williams	2,186	1.4
Total votes		153,468	100.0
Turnout			
Republican hold			

1970 United States House of Representatives elections in California
Party	Candidate	Votes	%
Republican	Bob Mathias (incumbent)	86,071	63.2
Democratic	Milton Spartacus Miller	48,415	33.4
American Independent	Nora E. Hensley	1,709	3.4
Total votes		136,195	100.0
Turnout			
Republican hold			

1972 United States House of Representatives elections in California
Party	Candidate	Votes	%
Republican	Bob Mathias (incumbent)	109,993	66.5
Democratic	Vincent J. Lavery	55,484	33.5
Total votes		165,477	100.0
Turnout			
Republican hold			

1974 United States House of Representatives elections in California
Party	Candidate	Votes	%
Democratic	John Hans Krebs	66,082	51.9
Republican	Bob Mathias (incumbent)	61,242	48.1
Total votes		127,324	100.0
Turnout			
Democratic gain from Republican			

Records
Preceded by Glenn Morris	World Record Holder for Men's Decathlon; June 30, 1950 – June 11, 1955	Succeeded by Rafer Johnson
Awards
Preceded by Carl Joyce	Track & Field News High School Boys Athlete of the Year; 1948	Succeeded by George Brown
U.S. House of Representatives
Preceded by Harlan Hagen	Member of the U.S. House of Representatives from California's 18th congressional district 1967–1975	Succeeded by William M. Ketchum
Party political offices
Preceded by Everett Dirksen; Gerald Ford	Response to the State of the Union address 1968; Served alongside: Howard Baker, George H. W. Bush, Peter H. Dominick, Gerald Ford, Robert P. Griffin, Thomas Kuchel, Melvin Laird, George Murphy, Richard Harding Poff, Charles H. Percy, Al Quie, Charlotte Reid, Hugh Scott, William A. Steiger, John Tower	Vacant Title next held by Donald M. Fraser, Henry M. Jackson, Mike Mansfield, John William McCormack, Patsy Mink, Edmund Muskie, William Proxmire
