= Max Wehrli (athlete) =

Swiss decathlete

Personal information
- Nationality: Swiss
- Born: 28 April 1930
- Died: 31 May 2014 (aged 84)

Sport
- Sport: Athletics
- Event: Decathlon

Max Wehrli (28 April 1930 – 31 May 2014) was a Swiss athlete. He competed in the men's decathlon at the 1952 Summer Olympics.
