= Guðrún Erlendsdóttir =

Icelandic lawyer and judge

Guðrún Erlendsdóttir (born 1936) is an Icelandic lawyer and judge. From 1970 to 1986, she was a professor at the law department of the University of Iceland, and was the first woman to be appointed to the Supreme Court, serving from 15 September 1982 to 30 June 1983, and again from 1 July 1986 to 15 April 2006. In 1991–92, she first served as president of the Supreme Court under a system of rotating presidencies, serving for a second term in 2002–03.

== Biography ==
Born in Reykjavík on 1 May 1936, Guðrún Erlendsdóttir was the daughter of Erlendur Ólafsson and Jóhanna Vigdís Semundsdottir. On 9 July 1961, she married the lawyer and athlete Örn Clausen (1928–2008) with whom she had three children: Ólafur Arnarson, Guðrún Sesselja Arnardóttir and Jóhanna Vigdis Arnardóttir. After graduating with a law degree from the University of Iceland in 1961, she established a private law practice in Reykjavík together with her husband (1961–1970) and worked as a law professor at the University of Iceland from 1970 until 1986, when she was appointed a high court judge (she previously served in the same position from 1982 to 1983). She was the first woman to serve as President of the Supreme Court of Iceland (1991–1992) under a system of rotating presidencies. She resigned on 15 April 2006.

Guðrún Erlendsdóttir also chaired the Equal Opportunities Council (1976–1979), served on the Censorship Committee (1974–98) and was Deputy Chair of the Board of the Icelandic Legal Association (1981–1995). She has published a number of books and articles on family law and sexual equality.
