= Göran Waxberg =

Swedish decathlete

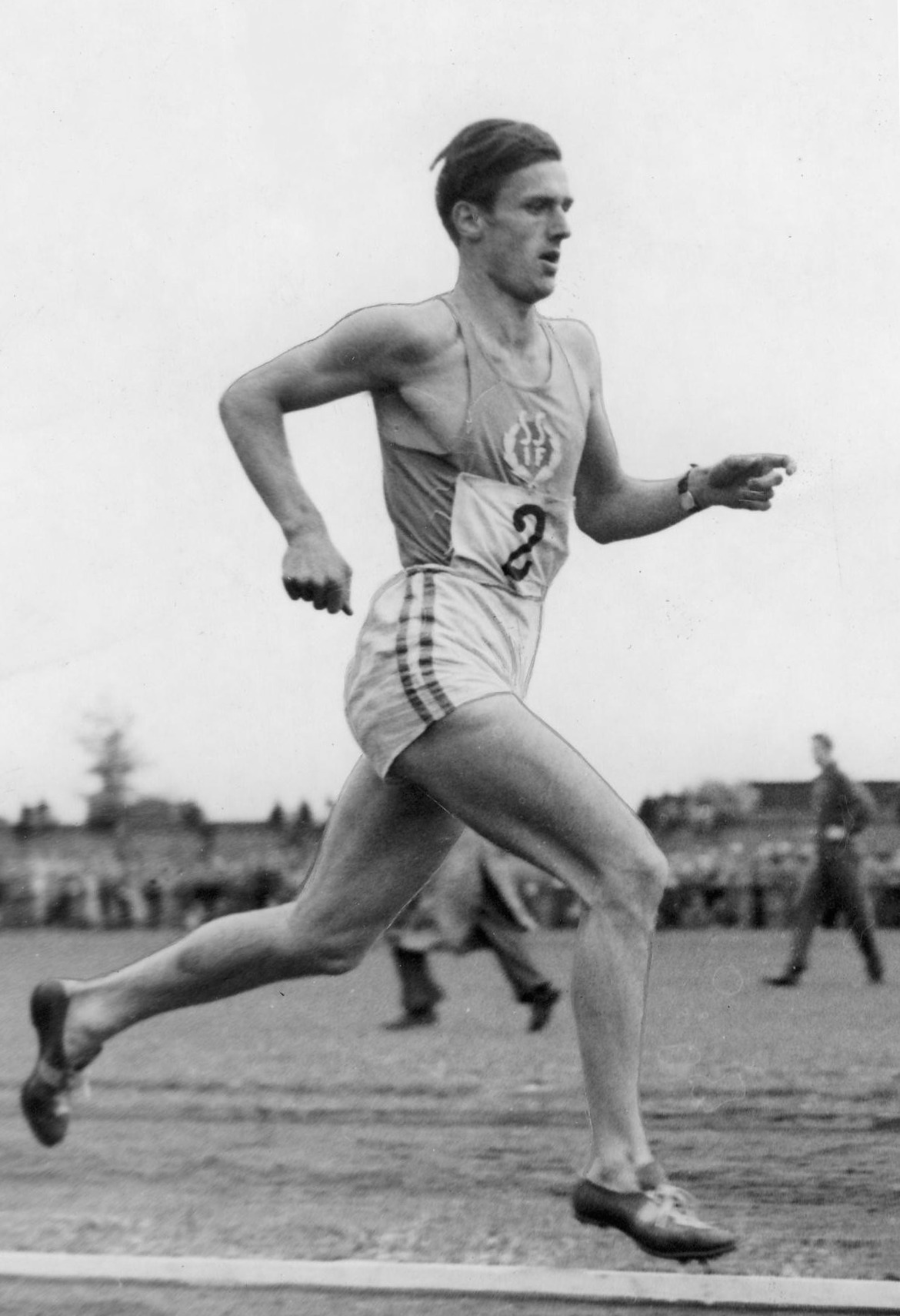

Personal information
- Born: 23 May 1919
- Died: 2007 (aged 87–88)

Sport
- Sport: Athletics
- Event(s): Decathlon, long jump
- Club: Stockholms Studenters IF

Achievements and titles
- Personal best(s): Dec – 7008 (1943); LJ – 7.43 m (1944)
Medal record
Men's athletics
Representing Sweden
European Championships
Bronze medal – third place	1946 Oslo	Decathlon

Göran Waxberg (23 May 1919 – 2007) was a Swedish decathlete who won a bronze medal at the 1946 European Championships. Waxberg was national champion in the decathlon in 1942–45 and in the pentathlon in 1943–45, and held a national pentathlon record.
