= Milt Campbell =

American decathlete (1933–2012)

No. 48, 84, 86, 31, 78
- Position: Fullback

Personal information
- Born: December 9, 1933; Plainfield, New Jersey, U.S.
- Died: November 2, 2012 (aged 78); Gainesville, Georgia, U.S.
- Listed height: 6 ft 3 in (1.91 m)
- Listed weight: 217 lb (98 kg)

Career information
- High school: Plainfield
- College: Indiana
- NFL draft: 1957: 5th round, 53rd overall pick

Career history
- Cleveland Browns (1957); Hamilton Tiger-Cats (1958); Kitchener-Waterloo Dutchmen (1959); Montreal Alouettes (1959); Toronto Argonauts (1961, 1964)

Career NFL statistics
- Rushing yards: 23
- Rushing average: 3.3
- Receptions: 1
- Receiving yards: 25
- Total touchdowns: 1
- Stats at Pro Football Reference

Medal record

Men's athletics

Representing the United States

Olympic Games
Gold medal – first place	1956 Melbourne	Decathlon
Silver medal – second place	1952 Helsinki	Decathlon

Milton Gray Campbell (December 9, 1933 – November 2, 2012) was an American decathlete of the 1950s. In 1956, he became the first African American to win the gold medal in the decathlon of the Summer Olympic Games.

== Personal life ==
Campbell was born in Plainfield, New Jersey. At Plainfield High School he competed in track, football and swimming. He then enrolled at the Indiana University (Bloomington), where he played football and ran track.

Milton Gray Campbell, more commonly known as “Milt”, was born on December 9, 1933, in Plainfield, New Jersey. While Campbell's love for sports was apparent from a very young age - always competing with and trying to outperform his older brother, Tom - his athletic prowess was first noticed in high school. He attended Plainfield High School (class of '53) where he participated in track and field, played football, and swam at a time when it was a widely accepted idea in the sports world that African-Americans were unable to properly swim.

== Track and field ==
While a student at Plainfield High School, Campbell won a place on the 1952 Olympic team in the decathlon. Although just 18 years old, Campbell finished second to Bob Mathias in the decathlon. Campbell set New Jersey state records in the high and low hurdles and in the high jump, and scored 140 points as fullback in football. He was inducted into the New Jersey State Interscholastic Athletic Association Hall of Fame in 1997. He was Track and Field News "High School Athlete of the Year" in 1952.

While he earned the distinction of “All-State” in both football and swimming, Campbell excelled most in track and field, and told his coach that he aspired to be the greatest athlete in the entire state of New Jersey, to which his coach responded that he believed Campbell could possibly become the best in the world. Campbell, surprised at his response, inquired how such a feat would be possible for him to achieve. His coach instructed him that in order to do so, he would have to win the Olympic decathlon. Campbell, having never heard of the decathlon, had to look it up to gain more information. Intrigued by its nature, Campbell decided to take on the challenge and began training. He wanted to represent the United States in the upcoming 1952 Olympic Games which were to be held in Helsinki. Campbell initially wanted to qualify for the hurdles event, but when the day came he placed fourth, with only the top three qualifying. Through the guidance of his Plainfield High coach, an 18-year-old Campbell made the Olympic decathlon team - his qualifier being his first-ever participation in a decathlon event - and ended up placing second behind Bob Mathias, the gold medalist from the previous 1948 London Games. When he returned home to New Jersey, he was greeted with applause and congratulations for earning a silver medal in the event. However, Campbell himself was disappointed, having wanted to win, and knew that he needed to practice harder and longer over the next four years in order to excel at and win the 1956 Olympics, which were to be held in Melbourne.

In the time between the 1952 and 1956 Olympics, Campbell enrolled at the Indiana University (Bloomington), and, much like in high school, he played football and ran track - further preparing for the upcoming Games. By the time the summer of 1956 rolled around, Campbell was prepared: He went out onto the Melbourne track and dominated, earning a gold medal in the decathlon, and also setting a record of 13.4 seconds for the 120 yd hurdles.

== Football ==
Campbell was also an excellent swimmer as a youth. An all around athlete, Campbell was drafted in the fifth round by the NFL Cleveland Browns in 1957 and played one season in the same backfield as Jim Brown. Milt was released from the Cleveland Browns by owner Paul Brown for marrying a white woman. He then played for several years in the Canadian Football League, ending his football career in 1964.

While his spectacular performance as an Olympic decathlete was likely the peak of his athletic career, he continued to display his prowess on the football field, being drafted by the NFL Cleveland Browns in 1957. He rushed seven times for 23 total yards in the halfback position and played alongside MVP and Rookie of the Year running back Jim Brown. However, his NFL career was unjustly short-lived: The owner of the Browns, Paul Brown, placed his segregationist ideals above Campbell's athletic ability, and kicked him off the team for his marriage to Barbara Mount, a white woman. According to Campbell, Brown called him into his office the day before Campbell was “let go” and asked him why he got married, Campbell responded “I got married for the same reason you got married, I presume,” and told Brown that it was none of his business. He received a letter the next day telling him that his services were no longer needed by the Browns. Still wanting to pursue a career in football, Campbell went to Canada, where he joined the Canadian Football League, playing with the Hamilton Tiger-Cats (8 games rushing for 468 yards), Kitchener-Waterloo Dutchmen, Montreal Alouettes (3 games) and Toronto Argonauts (9 games) until his retirement in 1964.

== Judo ==
As he finished with most sports, Milt sought to stay active. He started Judo and quickly progressed through the ranks under Yoshishada Yoneska. Yoshishada stated that Milt had a strong chance to make the 1972 Olympic team. An AAU Official took his card and stated he could not compete in the Olympics for Judo. The reason was that Milt had competed as a professional football player. Milt was troubled as professional track runners were allowed to compete in the Olympics, but he could not because he played football.

In 2008, a degree of Doctor of Public Service, honoris causa, was conferred upon him by Monmouth University in West Long Branch, New Jersey.

== Legacy ==
Despite his accomplishments as an athlete, Milt Campbell never became a household name, nor was he rewarded like other famous athletes of his time. Other Olympic decathletes such as Bob Mathias and Bruce Jenner gained many significant endorsements and a spot on a Wheaties box after their victories, while Campbell walked off of the 1956 podium with no cash, sponsors, or television executives asking for a feature. When asked about these differences in treatment, Campbell declared that “America wasn't ready for a black man to be the best athlete in the world”. He has since been regarded as the Olympic superstar who is “famous” for not being famous.

Campbell was inducted into the Indiana University Athletics Hall of Fame in 1982, and United States Olympic Hall of Fame in 1992. In June 2012, Campbell was voted into the New Jersey Hall of Fame. (nytimes.com). He is also present in the National Track and Field Hall of Fame and the International Swimming Hall of Fame, and remains the only individual to hold a spot in both of these Halls.

Following a long-fought battle with prostate cancer, Campbell died in his Gainesville, GA home in the summer of 2012 with his long-standing girlfriend Linda Rusch, by his side. He was 78 years old. His brother (Thomas L. Campbell, Jr.) preceded him in death. Milt is survived by his sister (Sandra E. Campbell Smith), his daughters (Julee Campbell, Dorianne B., and Mona H.), his sons (Milton G. Campbell Jr., deceased, Justin Campbell, and Milton G. Campbell, III), his granddaughter (Taria L. Campbell), and his great-grandchild (Nathaniel G. Johnsen). He is interred at Memorial Park Cemetery and Mausoleum - North in Gainesville.

Awards
Preceded by Leon Patterson	Track & Field News High School Boys Athlete of the Year; 1952	Succeeded by Don Vick
