= Fritz Nussbaum =

Swiss decathlete

Personal information
- Nationality: Swiss
- Born: 1 January 1924; Uster, Switzerland
- Died: 11 September 2013 (aged 89); Langenthal, Switzerland

Sport
- Sport: Athletics
- Event: Decathlon

Fritz Nussbaum (1 January 1924 – 11 September 2013) was a Swiss athlete. He competed in the men's decathlon at the 1948 Summer Olympics.
