= Athletics at the 1955 Pan American Games – Men's javelin throw =

Men's javelin throw at the Pan American Games

The men's javelin throw event at the 1955 Pan American Games was held at the Estadio Universitario in Mexico City on 17 March.

== Results ==
Rank	Name	Nationality	Result	Notes
1st place, gold medalist(s)	Bud Held	United States	69.77	GR
2nd place, silver medalist(s)	Ricardo Héber	Argentina	66.15	
3rd place, bronze medalist(s)	Reinaldo Oliver	Puerto Rico	65.56	
4	Carlos Fajer	Mexico	61.84	
5	Brigido Iriarte	Venezuela	56.29	
6	Alberto Vera	Mexico	53.97	
	John Pavelich	Canada	NM	
	Rafer Johnson	United States	DNS	
	Robert Allison	United States	DNS	
