= Pyotr Kozhevnikov =

Soviet decathlete (born 1927)

Personal information
- Nationality: Soviet
- Born: 1927

Sport
- Sport: Athletics
- Event: Decathlon

Pyotr Kozhevnikov (born 1927) was a Soviet athlete. He competed in the men's decathlon at the 1952 Summer Olympics.
