= Sayed Moukhtar =

Egyptian athlete

Sayed Ezz El-Din Moukhtar
Personal information
- Nationality: Egyptian
- Born: 9 January 1922 Tanta, Egypt
- Died: 19 January 2003 (aged 81) Cairo, Egypt

Sport
- Sport: Sprinting
- Event: 100 metres

Sayed Ezz El-Din Moukhtar (9 January 1922 – 19 January 2003) was an Egyptian athlete. He competed in the men's 100 metres and the men's decathlon at the 1948 Summer Olympics.
