= Athletics at the 1955 Pan American Games – Men's pole vault =

Men's pole vault at the Pan American Games

The men's pole vault event at the 1955 Pan American Games was held at the Estadio Universitario in Mexico City on 15 March.

== Results ==
| Rank | Name | Nationality | Result | Notes |
|---|---|---|---|---|
| 1st place, gold medalist(s) | Bob Richards | United States | 4.50 | =GR |
| 2nd place, silver medalist(s) | Bob Smith | United States | 4.30 | |
| 3rd place, bronze medalist(s) | Don Laz | United States | 4.30 | |
| 4 | Fausto de Souza | Brazil | 4.00 | |
| 5 | Jorge Aguilera | Mexico | 3.90 | |
| 6 | Brígido Iriarte | Venezuela | 3.60 | |
