= Sergey Kuznetsov (athlete) =

Russian decathlete

Personal information
- Full name: Sergey Ilich Kuznetsov
- Nationality: Russian
- Born: 2 June 1918 Kemerovo, Russian SFSR
- Died: 2010 (aged 91–92)

Sport
- Sport: Athletics
- Event: Decathlon
Medal record
Men's athletics
Representing Soviet Union
European Championships
Silver medal – second place	1946 Oslo	Decathlon

Sergey Ilich Kuznetsov (2 June 1918 – 2010) was a Russian athlete. He competed in the men's decathlon at the 1952 Summer Olympics, representing the Soviet Union.
