= Örn Clausen =

Icelandic decathlete

Personal information
- Nationality: Icelandic
- Born: 8 November 1928 Reykjavík, Iceland
- Died: 12 December 2008 (aged 84) Reykjavík, Iceland
- Height: 184 cm (6 ft 0 in)
- Weight: 83 kg (183 lb)

Sport
- Sport: Athletics
- Event: Decathlon/Sprint/hurdes
- Club: ÍR, Reykjavík
Medal record
Men's athletics
Representing Iceland
European Championships
Silver medal – second place	1950 Brussels	Decathlon

Örn Clausen (8 November 1928 – 12 December 2008) was an Icelandic athlete who competed mainly in the decathlon.

== Biography ==
He was born in Reykjavík and finished 12th in the decathlon competition at the 1948 Summer Olympics.

Clausen finished third behind Jack Parker in the 120 yards hurdles event at the 1951 AAA Championships.

Örn Clausen, a lawyer, was married to the lawyer and supreme court judge Guðrún Erlendsdóttir.
