= Bengt Sjösten =

Swedish sailor

Bengt Sjösten (27 December 1925 – 20 June 2005) was a Swedish sailor who competed in the 1960 Summer Olympics.
