= Hans-Günther Hilker =

German water polo player

Personal information
- Nationality: German
- Born: 15 May 1932; Duisburg, Germany
- Died: 12 June 2005 (aged 73); Duisburg, Germany

Sport
- Sport: Water polo

Hans-Günther Hilker (15 May 1932 – 12 June 2005) was a German water polo player. He competed in the men's tournament at the 1956 Summer Olympics.
