= Skačany =

- Municipality
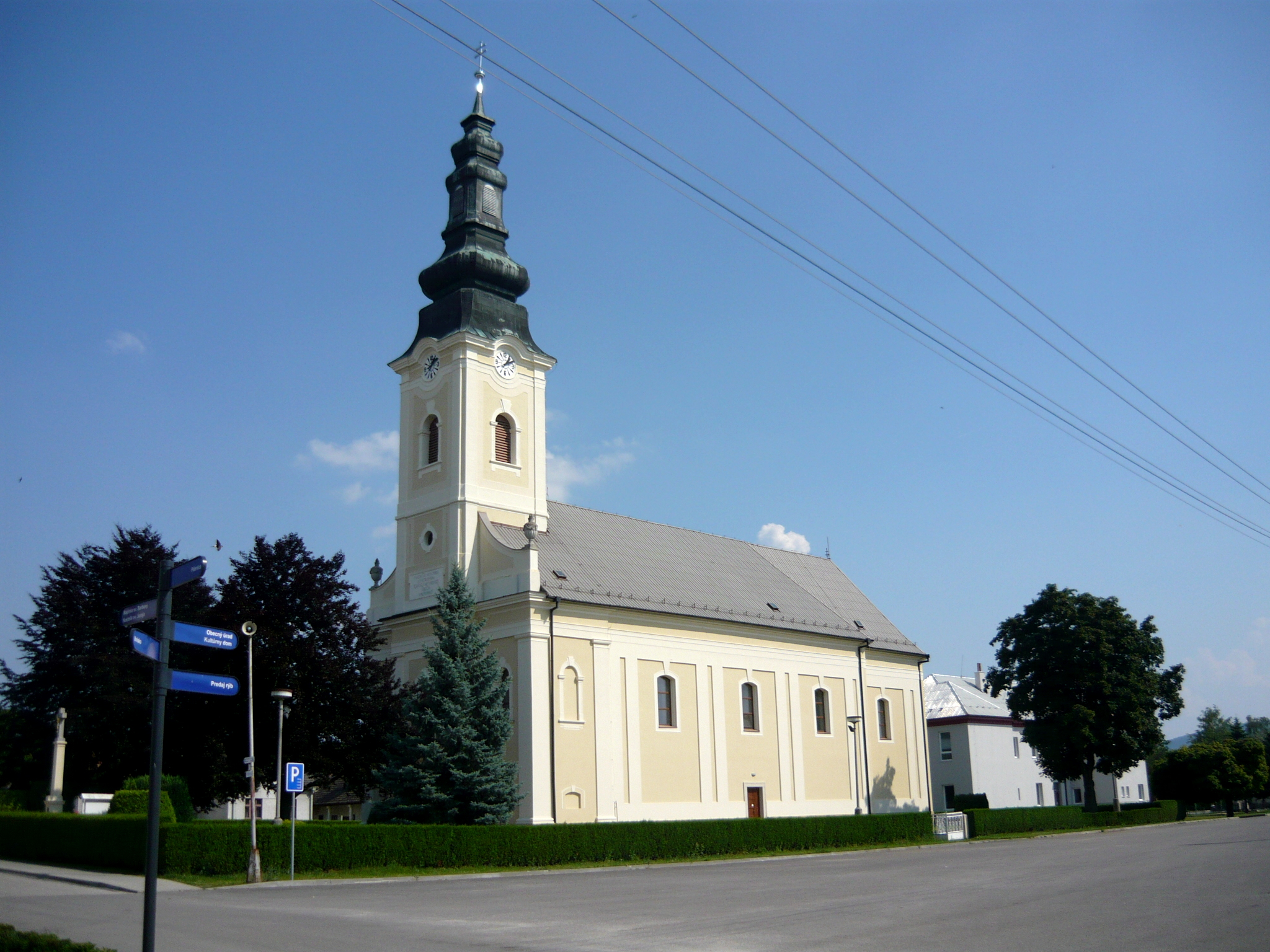
- Church of All Saints

- Flag

- Location of Skačany in the Trenčín Region Location of Skačany in Slovakia
- Coordinates: 48.67°N 18.38°E
- Country: Slovakia
- Region: Trenčín Region
- District: Partizánske District
- First mentioned: 1078

Area
  - Total: 15.37 km^{2} (5.93 sq mi)
- Elevation: 205 m (673 ft)

Population (2025)
  - Total: 1,305
- Time zone: UTC+1 (CET)
  - Summer (DST): UTC+2 (CEST)
- Postal code: 958 53
- Area code: +421 38
- Vehicle registration plate (until 2022): PE
- Website: www.skacany.sk

Skačany (Hungarian: Szkacsány) is a village and municipality in Partizánske District in the Trenčín Region of western Slovakia.

== History ==
In historical records the village was first mentioned in 1078.

== Geography ==
The municipality lies at an altitude of 205 metres (673 ft) and covers an area of 15.37 km^{2} (5.93 sq mi) (2025).

== Population ==
Population statistic (10 years)
Year	1995	2005	2015	2025
Count	1269	1284	1376	1305
Difference		+1.18%	+7.16%	−5.15%

Population statistic
Year	2024	2025
Count	1327	1305
Difference		−1.65%

It has a population of 1305 people (31 December 2025).

=== Ethnicity ===
Census 2021 (1+ %)
Ethnicity	Number	Fraction
Slovak	1303	97.45%
Hungarian	20	1.49%
Total	1337	

In year 2021 was 1337 people by ethnicity 1303 as Slovak, 20 as Hungarian, 8 as Not found out, 7 as Czech, 5 as Irish, 5 as Romani, 4 as Polish, 3 as German, 3 as Other, 2 as Rusyn, 2 as Croatian and 1 as Moravian.

Note on population: The difference values of population numbers in the table "Population statistic" and in the sections "Ethnicity" & "Religion" is caused by the use of various statistical methods.

=== Religion ===
Census 2021 (1+ %)
Religion	Number	Fraction
Roman Catholic Church	1064	79.58%
None	189	14.14%
Not found out	52	3.89%
Total	1337	

In year 2021 was 1337 people by religion 1064 from Roman Catholic Church, 189 from None, 52 from Not found out, 8 from Christian Congregations in Slovakia, 8 from Evangelical Church, 5 from Greek Catholic Church, 3 from Other, 3 from Ad hoc movements, 2 from Buddhism, 1 from Calvinist Church, 1 from Paganism and natural spirituality and 1 from United Methodist Church.
