= Göran Widenfelt =

Personal information
- Nationality: Swedish
- Born: 13 August 1928
- Died: 9 March 1985 (aged 56)

Sport
- Sport: Athletics
- Events: High jump Decathlon

Göran Widenfelt (13 August 1928 – 9 March 1985) was a Swedish athlete. He competed in the men's high jump at the 1948 Summer Olympics and the men's decathlon at the 1952 Summer Olympics.
