= Ken Griffith =

American basketball player

Personal information
- Born: July 31, 1918 Virginia
- Died: June 5, 2005 (aged 86) Rockmart, Georgia
- Listed height: 6 ft 2 in (1.88 m)
- Listed weight: 195 lb (88 kg)

Career information
- High school: Wellsburg (Wellsburg, West Virginia)
- College: Alderson Broaddus (1937–1941)
- Position: Guard

Career history
- 1941–1942, 1943–1944, 1946–1947: Akron Goodyear Wingfoots

Career highlights
- 2× First-team All-WVIAC (1939, 1941)

Kenneth Lee Griffith (July 31, 1918 – June 5, 2005) was an American professional basketball player. He played for the Akron Goodyear Wingfoots in the National Basketball League and averaged 1.5 points per game.

Griffith did not play competitive basketball until attending Alderson Broaddus University. In his career he scored 1,941 points and passed Stanford player Hank Luisetti's for a then all-time college basketball career scoring record. Griffith also served in World War II and later worked at Goodyear for close to 40 years.
