= Godtfred Holmvang =

Norwegian decathlete and skier

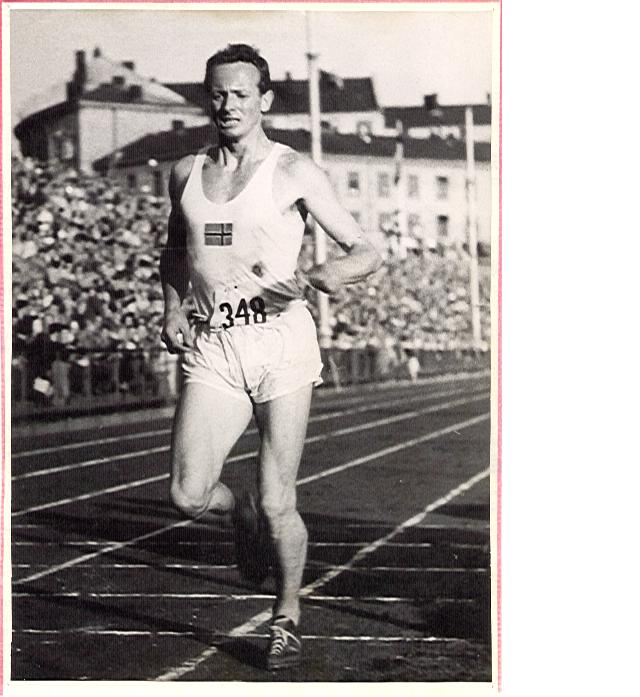
- 1946 European Championships, Oslo, Norway

Medal record

Men's athletics

Representing Norway

European Championships
Gold medal – first place	1946 Oslo	Decathlon

Godtfred Holmvang (7 October 1917 – 19 February 2006) was a Norwegian decathlete and skier. He represented IL Tyrving.

He won the 1946 European Championships and finished tenth at the 1948 Summer Olympics. He became Norwegian decathlon champion in 1939, 1946 and 1948. In addition he won the Norwegian championships in 110 metres hurdles in 1946. He came 4th in the alpine combination in the Norwegian Skiing Championships 1947. His career was interrupted by World War II in Norway 1940–1945.

Holmvang was born 7 October 1917 in Bærum Municipality, Norway, and was known as "Gotti". He was involved in many sports including skiing, orienteering, track, tennis, bandy and handball. Holmvang helped establish orienteering at Notodden. He attended Law School in Oslo 1939 and was a Prisoner of War 1943. He was awarded Egebergs Ærespris 1946. Holmvang was married to Anne Margrethe Lovaas. He proceeded to further education at London School of Economics and attained his Master of Law at Harvard. He worked for the United Nations in New York to develop international maritime law. Holmvang emigrated to Vancouver, British Columbia, Canada, in 1968 and worked as a legal advisor to the shipping industry until retirement. He had two children, Godtfred Jr and Annette Margrethe. Holmvang died 19 February 2006 in Vancouver.

Awards
Preceded by Arne Larsen	Egebergs Ærespris; 1946	Succeeded by Sverre Farstad
