= Olli Reikko =

Finnish decathlete

Personal information
- Nationality: Finnish
- Born: 10 January 1927 Pori, Finland
- Died: 23 June 2005 (aged 78) Pori, Finland

Sport
- Sport: Athletics
- Event: Decathlon

Olli Reikko (10 January 1927 – 23 June 2005) was a Finnish athlete. He competed in the men's decathlon at the 1952 Summer Olympics.
