= Albert Dayer =

Belgian decathlete 1925–1987

Personal information
- Nationality: Belgian
- Born: 11 October 1925; Ixelles, Belgium
- Died: May 1987; Brussels, Belgium

Sport
- Sport: Athletics
- Event: Decathlon

Albert Dayer (11 October 1925 – May 1987) was a Belgian athlete. He competed in the men's decathlon at the 1948 Summer Olympics.
