= Georges Breitman =

French track and field athlete

Georges Breitman (27 March 1920 – 27 January 2014) was a French track and field athlete who competed in the 1948 Summer Olympics and in the 1952 Summer Olympics. He was born in Paris.
