= Oskar Gerber =

Swiss decathlete (1919–2005)

Personal information
- Nationality: Swiss
- Born: 30 January 1919
- Died: 28 June 2005 (aged 86)

Sport
- Sport: Athletics
- Event: Decathlon

Oskar Gerber (30 January 1919 – 28 June 2005) was a Swiss athlete. He competed in the men's decathlon at the 1948 Summer Olympics. Gerber died on 28 June 2005, at the age of 86.
