= Pat Leane =

Australian athlete (1930–2018)

Patrick Francis Leane (11 January 1930 – 12 October 2018) was an Australian track and field athlete who competed in the 1952 Summer Olympics and in the 1956 Summer Olympics.
