= Bob Adams (decathlete) =

Canadian decathlete (1924–2019)

Robert Adams (20 December 1924 – 23 February 2019) was a Canadian decathlete who competed in the 1952 Summer Olympics. He also represented Canada at the 1954 British Empire and Commonwealth Games, taking part in the pole vault and high jump disciplines. He was born in Alsask, Saskatchewan.
