= Friedel Schirmer =

German decathlete

Member of the Bundestag
- In office 20 October 1969 – 29 March 1983
- Preceded by: Friedrich Blume
- Succeeded by: Helmut Rode
- Constituency: Schaumburg (1969–1980); Nienburg – Schaumburg (1980–1983)

Personal details
- Born: Friedel Wilhelm Heinrich Schirmer; 20 March 1926 Stadthagen, Germany
- Died: 30 November 2014 (aged 88) Stadthagen, Germany
- Party: Social Democratic
- Children: 1
- Sports career
- Nationality: German
- Height: 181 cm (5 ft 11 in)
- Weight: 65 kg (143 lb)
- Sport: Athletics
- Event: Decathlon

Friedel Schirmer (20 March 1926 – 30 November 2014) was a German athlete and politician. He competed in the men's decathlon at the 1952 Summer Olympics.
