= Per Axel Eriksson =

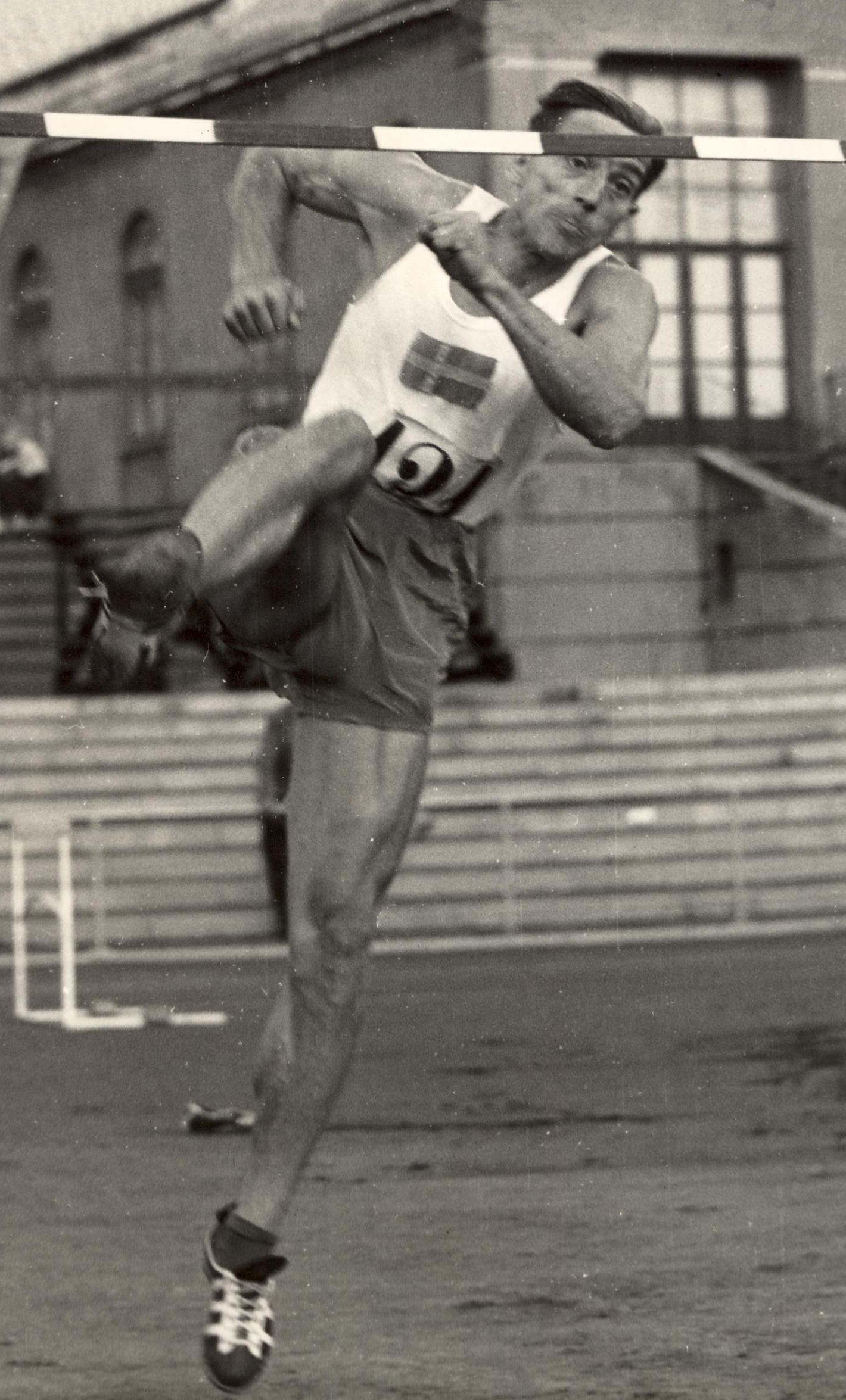

Personal information
- Born: 11 April 1925 Nyhammar, Sweden
- Died: 6 October 2016 (aged 91)
- Height: 1.78 m (5 ft 10 in)
- Weight: 73 kg (161 lb)

Sport
- Sport: Athletics
- Event: Decathlon
- Club: Söderhamns IF; Ljusne AIK; Arbrå IK

Achievements and titles
- Personal best: 6570/6987 (1950)

Per Axel Eriksson (11 April 1925 – 6 October 2016) was a Swedish decathlete who finished seventh at the 1948 Summer Olympics. He won the national titles in the pentathlon in 1946–48 and 1951–53 and in the decathlon in 1948 and 1953–56. His son Per Thomas Eriksson is also a retired Olympic track and field athlete who competed in multiple events.
