= Ignace Heinrich =

French decathlete

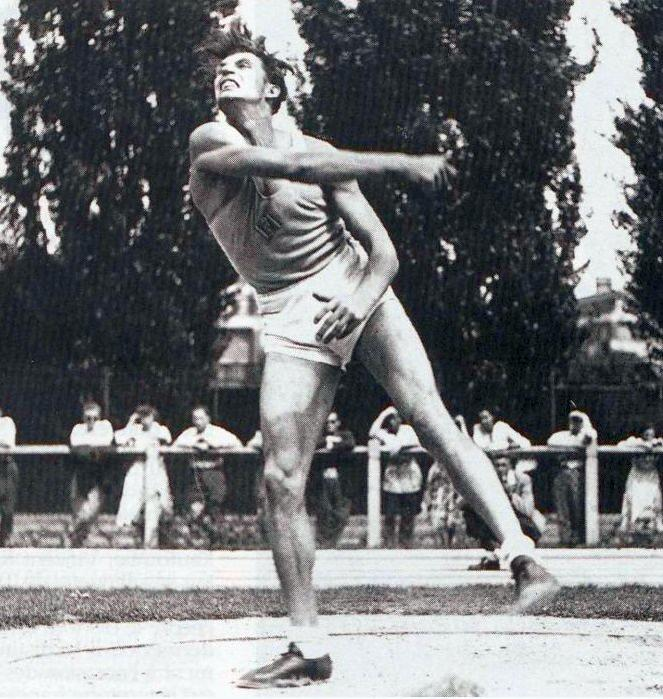

Personal information
- Born: 31 July 1925 Ebersheim, France
- Died: 9 January 2003 (aged 77) Carnoux-en-Provence, France
Medal record
Men's athletics
Representing France
Olympic Games
Silver medal – second place	1948 London	Decathlon
European Championships
Gold medal – first place	1950 Brussels	Decathlon

Ignace Heinrich (31 July 1925 – 9 January 2003) was a French athlete who competed mainly in the decathlon. He was born in Ebersheim, Bas-Rhin, Alsace.

He competed for France in the decathlon at the 1948 Summer Olympics held in London, Great Britain, winning a silver medal. He died in Carnoux-en-Provence.
