= Vladimir Volkov (athlete) =

Russian decathlete (1921–1986)

Personal information
- Nationality: Russian
- Born: 7 March 1921 Moscow, Russian SFSR
- Died: 1986 (aged 64–65)

Sport
- Sport: Athletics
- Event: Decathlon

Vladimir Vasilyevich Volkov (Russian: Влади́мир Васи́льевич Во́лков; 7 March 1921 – 1986) was a Russian athlete. He competed in the men's decathlon at the 1952 Summer Olympics, representing the Soviet Union. He was also the Soviet champion in the same event.
