= Kjell Tånnander =

Swedish decathlete

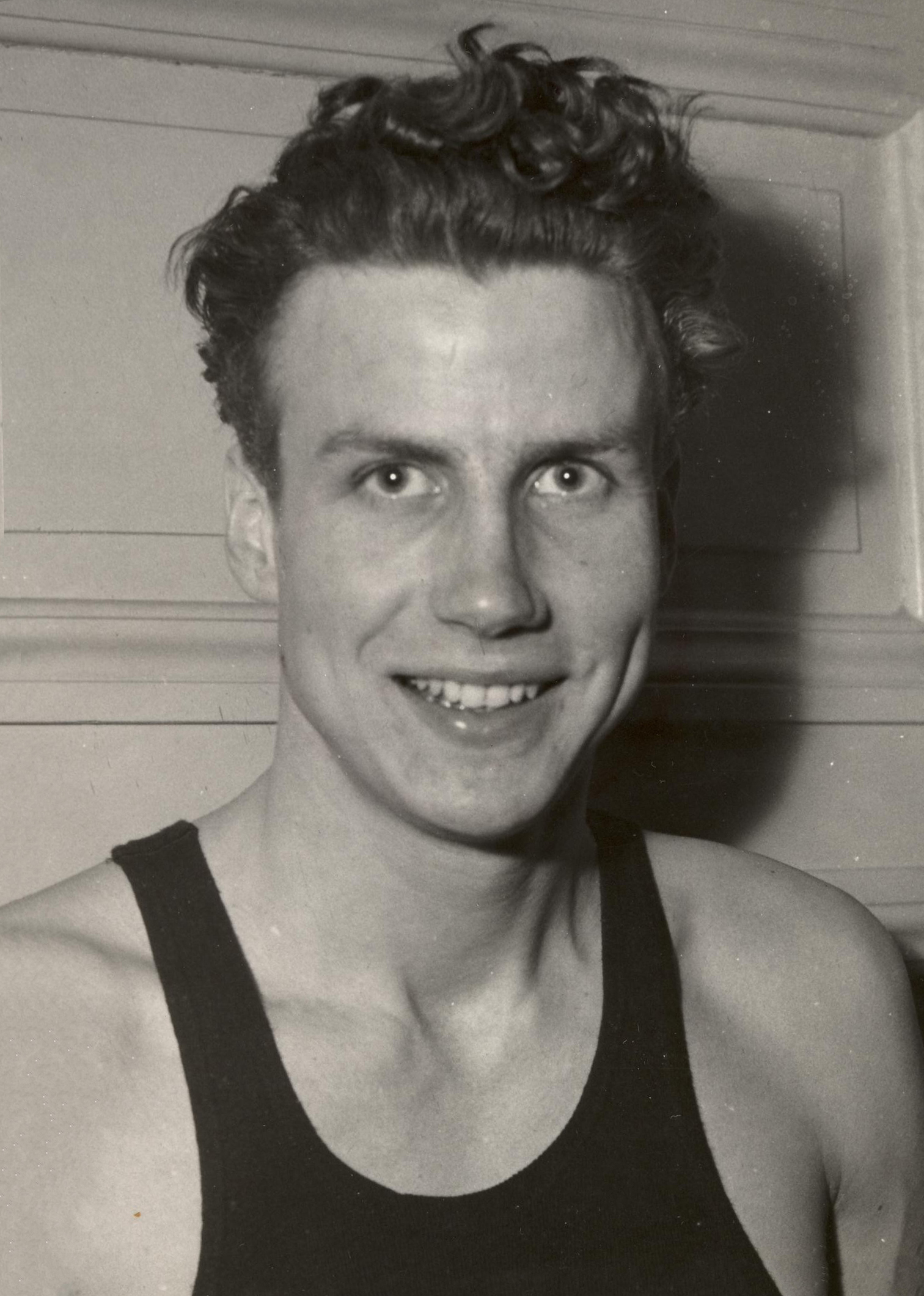

Personal information
- Born: 25 July 1927 (age 98) Långaröd, Hörby, Sweden
- Height: 1.93 m (6 ft 4 in)
- Weight: 86 kg (190 lb)

Sport
- Sport: Athletics
- Event: Decathlon
- Club: Ystads IF, Ystad; Malmö AI

Achievements and titles
- Personal best: 6664/7175 (1950)
Medal record
Men's athletics
Representing Sweden
European Championships
Bronze medal – third place	1950 Brussels	Decathlon

Kjell Uno Jörgen Tånnander (born 25 June 1927) is a Swedish retired decathlete who won a bronze medal at the 1950 European Athletics Championships. He competed at the 1948 and 1952 Summer Olympics and finished in 15th and 7th place, respectively. His daughters Annette and Kristine became Olympic heptathletes.

Tånnander won the Swedish decathlon title in 1949 and 1951. Between 1949 and 1955 he also collected 15 medals in the standing high jump and standing long jump at the national championships.
