= Fernando Fernandes (hurdler) =

Portuguese hurdler

Personal information
- Nationality: Portuguese
- Born: 7 June 1920
- Died: 28 March 1991 (aged 70)

Sport
- Sport: Track and field
- Event: 400 metres hurdles

Fernando Fernandes (7 June 1920 – 28 March 1991) was a Portuguese hurdler. He competed in the men's 400 metres hurdles at the 1952 Summer Olympics.
