= Oto Rebula =

Serbian decathlete

Personal information
- Nationality: Serbian
- Born: 14 August 1921; Banja Luka, Kingdom of Serbs, Croats, and Slovenes
- Died: 11 July 2001 (aged 79); Belgrade, FR Yugoslavia

Sport
- Sport: Athletics
- Event: Decathlon

Oto Rebula (14 August 1921 – 11 July 2001) was a Serbian athlete. He competed in the men's decathlon at the 1948 Summer Olympics and the 1952 Summer Olympics, representing Yugoslavia.
