= Athletics at the 1952 Summer Olympics – Men's 200 metres =

Men's 200 metres at the Games of the XV Olympiad
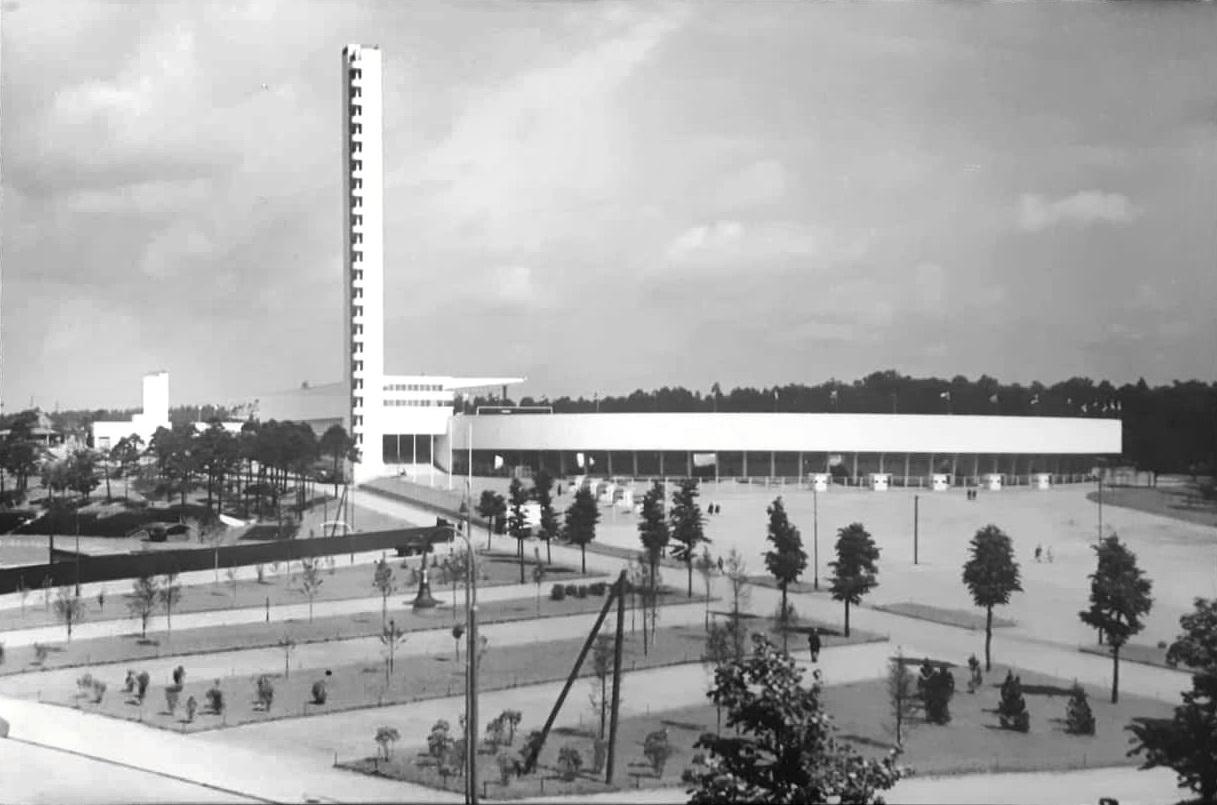
- Helsinki Olympic Stadium (1930s)
- Venue: Helsinki Olympic Stadium
- Dates: July 22, 1952 (heats and quarterfinals); July 23, 1952 (semifinals and final)
- Competitors: 71 from 35 nations
- Winning time: 20.7 =OR

Medalists
1st place, gold medalist(s)		Andy Stanfield; United States
2nd place, silver medalist(s)		Thane Baker; United States
3rd place, bronze medalist(s)		Jim Gathers; United States

The men's 200 metres sprint event at the 1952 Olympic Games took place between July 22 and July 23. There were 71 competitors from 35 nations. The maximum number of athletes per nation had been set at 3 since the 1930 Olympic Congress. The final was won by 0.16 seconds by American Andy Stanfield. Americans also took silver (Thane Baker) and bronze (Jim Gathers) as the United States swept the medals in the event for the third time (1904, 1932).

== Background ==
This was the 11th appearance of the event, which was not held at the first Olympics in 1896 but has been on the program ever since. One of the six finalists from the 1948 Games returned: sixth-place finisher Leslie Laing of Jamaica. Andy Stanfield, the inaugural world record setter for 200 metres around a curve and winner of three AAU titles, was the favorite.

Bulgaria, Guatemala, Israel, Nigeria, South Korea, the Soviet Union, Thailand, and Venezuela each made their debut in the event. The United States made its 11th appearance, the only nation to have competed at each edition of the 200 metres to date.

== Competition format ==
The competition used the four round format introduced in 1920: heats, quarterfinals, semifinals, and a final. There were 18 heats of between 2 and 5 runners each, with the top 2 men in each advancing to the quarterfinals. The quarterfinals consisted of 6 heats of 6 athletes each; the 2 fastest men in each heat advanced to the semifinals. There were 2 semifinals, each with 6 runners. In that round, the top 3 athletes advanced. The final had 6 runners. The races were run on a 400 metre track.

== Records ==
Prior to the competition, the existing world (curved track) and Olympic records were as follows. The world record (straight) was 20.2 seconds.

World record	Andy Stanfield (USA)	20.6	Los Angeles, United States	28 June 1952
Olympic record	Jesse Owens (USA)	20.7	Berlin, Germany	5 August 1936

No new world or Olympic records were set during the competition. Andy Stanfield's hand-timed final run of 20.7 seconds was equal to the Olympic record.

== Schedule ==
All times are Eastern European Summer Time (UTC+3)

Date	Time	Round
Tuesday, 22 July 1952	15:00; 18:50	Heats; Quarterfinals
Wednesday, 23 July 1952	15:45; 17:55	Semifinals; Final

== Results ==
=== Heats ===
The fastest two runners in each of the eighteen heats advanced to the quarterfinal round.

==== Heat 1 ====
Rank	Athlete	Nation	Time	Notes
1	Gerardo Bönnhoff	Argentina	21.72	Q
2	Étienne Bally	France	22.03	Q
3	Adolf Turakainen	Finland	22.55	
4	Hörður Haraldsson	Iceland	22.56	
-	Neville Price	South Africa	DNS	

==== Heat 2 ====
Rank	Athlete	Nation	Time	Notes
1	Thane Baker	United States	21.62	Q
2	Levan Sanadze	Soviet Union	22.26	Q
3	Stefanos Petrakis	Greece	22.64	
4	Willy Eichenberger	Switzerland	22.98	
-	Roy Fearon	Guatemala	DNS	

==== Heat 3 ====
Rank	Athlete	Nation	Time	Notes
1	Don McFarlane	Canada	22.94	Q
2	Roman Budzyński	Poland	23.37	Q
-	Álvaro Dias	Portugal	DNS	
-	Lexie Tynan	Ireland	DNS	
-	Herb McKenley	Jamaica	DNS	

==== Heat 4 ====
Rank	Athlete	Nation	Time	Notes
1	Rafael Fortún	Cuba	21.98	Q
2	Nick Stacey	Great Britain	22.07	Q
3	Fernand Linssen	Belgium	22.37	
4	Edward Ajado	Nigeria	22.92	
-	Angel Gavrilov	Bulgaria	DNS	

==== Heat 5 ====
Rank	Athlete	Nation	Time	Notes
1	Theo Saat	Netherlands	22.17	Q
2	Werner Zandt	Germany	22.23	Q
3	Juan Leiva	Venezuela	22.38	
4	Fawzi Chaaban	Egypt	22.90	
5	Eugénio Eleutério	Portugal	23.37	

==== Heat 6 ====
Rank	Athlete	Nation	Time	Notes
1	David Tabak	Israel	22.60	Q
2	Marcel Gerdil	France	22.71	Q
-	Cirilo McSween	Panama	DNS	
-	Ion Moina	Romania	DNS	
-	Morris Curotta	Australia	DNS	

==== Heat 7 ====
Rank	Athlete	Nation	Time	Notes
1	Andy Stanfield	United States	22.00	Q
2	Zdobysław Stawczyk	Poland	22.22	Q
3	Enrique Beckles	Argentina	22.73	
4	Youssef Ali Omar	Egypt	23.26	
5	Adul Wanasatith	Thailand	23.50	

==== Heat 8 ====
Rank	Athlete	Nation	Time	Notes
1	Vladimir Sukharev	Soviet Union	22.08	Q
2	Angel García	Cuba	22.14	Q
3	Hans Wehrli	Switzerland	22.35	
4	Pauli Tavisalo	Finland	22.45	
5	Abdul Aziz	Pakistan	23.02	

==== Heat 9 ====
Rank	Athlete	Nation	Time	Notes
1	Václav Janeček	Czechoslovakia	21.99	Q
2	Peter Kraus	Germany	22.06	Q
3	Muhammad Aslam	Pakistan	22.14	
4	Fred Hammer	Luxembourg	22.63	
-	Romeo Galán	Argentina	DNS	

==== Heat 10 ====
Rank	Athlete	Nation	Time	Notes
1	Brian Shenton	Great Britain	22.12	Q
2	Voitto Hellstén	Finland	22.41	Q
3	Roby Schaeffer	Luxembourg	22.76	
4	Vasilios Sillis	Greece	22.88	
-	José da Conceição	Brazil	DNS	

==== Heat 11 ====
Rank	Athlete	Nation	Time	Notes
1	Schalk Booysen	South Africa	22.03	Q
2	Gerard Mach	Poland	22.16	Q
3	Muhammad Sharif Butt	Pakistan	22.34	
4	Ásmundur Bjarnason	Iceland	22.51	
5	Walter Sutton	Canada	22.53	

==== Heat 12 ====
Rank	Athlete	Nation	Time	Notes
1	Jim Gathers	United States	21.42	Q
2	Tomio Hosoda	Japan	22.36	Q
3	Henry Brault	France	22.48	
4	Luigi Grossi	Italy	22.49	
5	Muslim Arogundade	Nigeria	22.71	

==== Heat 13 ====
Rank	Athlete	Nation	Time	Notes
1	McDonald Bailey	Great Britain	21.66	Q
2	Miroslav Horčic	Czechoslovakia	22.52	Q
3	Giorgio Sobrero	Italy	22.66	
4	Ernst Mühlethaler	Switzerland	23.26	
5	Eom Par-yong	South Korea	23.41	

==== Heat 14 ====
Rank	Athlete	Nation	Time	Notes
1	Rafiu Oluwa	Nigeria	22.89	Q
2	Boonterm Pakpuang	Thailand	24.15	Q
-	Leo Lickes	Germany	DNS	
-	George Acquaah	Ghana	DNS	
-	George Rhoden	Jamaica	DNS	

==== Heat 15 ====
Rank	Athlete	Nation	Time	Notes
1	Les Laing	Jamaica	21.97	Q
2	Paul Dolan	Ireland	22.04	Q
3	František Brož	Czechoslovakia	22.35	
4	Fernando Casimiro	Portugal	22.72	
5	José Julio Barillas	Guatemala	22.88	

==== Heat 16 ====
Rank	Athlete	Nation	Time	Notes
1	Raúl Mazorra	Cuba	22.52	Q
2	Robert Hutchinson	Canada	22.66	Q
3	Emad El-Din Shafei	Egypt	22.75	
4	Aroon Sankosik	Thailand	23.64	
-	Béla Goldoványi	Hungary	DNS	

==== Heat 17 ====
Rank	Athlete	Nation	Time	Notes
1	Edwin Carr, Jr.	Australia	22.19	
2	Angel Kolev	Bulgaria	22.24	
-	Feodosiy Golubev	Soviet Union	DNS	
-	Gustavo Ehlers	Chile	DNS	

==== Heat 18 ====
Rank	Athlete	Nation	Time	Notes
1	John Treloar	Australia	21.75	Q
2	Lavy Pinto	India	21.83	Q
3	Péter Karádi	Hungary	22.24	
4	Lucio Sangermano	Italy	22.38	
-	K. K. Korsah	Ghana	DNS	

=== Quarterfinals ===
The fastest two runners in each of the six heats advanced to the semifinal round.

==== Quarterfinal 1 ====
Rank	Athlete	Nation	Time	Notes
1	Jim Gathers	United States	21.64	Q
2	Lavy Pinto	India	21.80	Q
3	Theo Saat	Netherlands	21.87	
4	Zdobysław Stawczyk	Poland	22.12	
5	Miroslav Horčic	Czechoslovakia	22.44	
6	Raúl Mazorra	Cuba	31.00	

==== Quarterfinal 2 ====
Rank	Athlete	Nation	Time	Notes
1	Thane Baker	United States	21.64	Q
2	Rafael Fortún	Cuba	21.98	Q
3	Paul Dolan	Ireland	22.15	
4	Peter Kraus	Germany	22.19	
5	Voitto Hellstén	Finland	22.61	
6	Rafiu Oluwa	Nigeria	22.69	

==== Quarterfinal 3 ====
Rank	Athlete	Nation	Time	Notes
1	McDonald Bailey	Great Britain	21.27	Q
2	Václav Janeček	Czechoslovakia	21.93	Q
3	Edwin Carr, Jr.	Australia	21.98	
4	Schalk Booysen	South Africa	22.09	
5	Marcel Gerdil	France	22.37	
6	Robert Hutchinson	Canada	22.55	

==== Quarterfinal 4 ====
Rank	Athlete	Nation	Time	Notes
1	Gerardo Bönnhoff	Argentina	21.67	Q
2	Nick Stacey	Great Britain	21.79	Q
3	Angel Kolev	Bulgaria	22.07	
4	Angel García	Cuba	22.11	
5	David Tabak	Israel	22.34	
6	Roman Budzyński	Poland	22.51	

==== Quarterfinal 5 ====
Rank	Athlete	Nation	Time	Notes
1	Andy Stanfield	United States	21.21	Q
2	Les Laing	Jamaica	21.74	Q
3	Étienne Bally	France	22.02	
4	Levan Sanadze	Soviet Union	22.26	
5	Don McFarlane	Canada	22.33	
—	Boonterm Pakpuang	Thailand	DNS	

==== Quarterfinal 6 ====
Rank	Athlete	Nation	Time	Notes
1	John Treloar	Australia	21.86	Q
2	Werner Zandt	Germany	21.87	Q
3	Vladimir Sukharev	Soviet Union	21.88	
4	Gerard Mach	Poland	22.12	
5	Brian Shenton	Great Britain	22.24	
6	Tomio Hosoda	Japan	22.49	

=== Semifinals ===
The fastest three runners in each of the two heats advanced to the final round.

==== Semifinal 1 ====
Rank	Athlete	Nation	Time	Notes
1	Andy Stanfield	United States	21.23	Q
2	Jim Gathers	United States	21.58	Q
3	Les Laing	Jamaica	21.80	Q
4	Werner Zandt	Germany	21.92	
5	Nick Stacey	Great Britain	21.95	
6	Václav Janeček	Czechoslovakia	22.12	

==== Semifinal 2 ====
Rank	Athlete	Nation	Time	Notes
1	McDonald Bailey	Great Britain	21.46	Q
2	Thane Baker	United States	21.50	Q
3	Gerardo Bönnhoff	Argentina	21.75	Q
4	Rafael Fortún	Cuba	21.93	
5	Lavy Pinto	India	22.01	
-	John Treloar	Australia		DNF

=== Final ===
Standfield's hand-timed results of 20.7 seconds was equal to the Olympic record.

Rank	Athlete	Nation	Time	Notes
1st place, gold medalist(s)	Andy Stanfield	United States	20.81	=OR
2nd place, silver medalist(s)	Thane Baker	United States	20.97	
3rd place, bronze medalist(s)	James Gathers	United States	21.08	
4	McDonald Bailey	Great Britain	21.14	
5	Les Laing	Jamaica	21.45	
6	Gerardo Bönnhoff	Argentina	21.59	
