= Natalya Smirnitskaya =

Soviet javelin thrower

Medal record

Women's athletics

Representing the Soviet Union

European Championships
Gold medal – first place	1950 Brussels	Javelin

World Festival of Youth and Students
Gold medal – first place	1949 Budapest	Javelin
Bronze medal – third place	1951 East Berlin	Javelin

Natalya Vassilievna Smirnitskaya (Russian: Наталья Васильевна Смирницкая-Дятлова; née Dyatlova; 8 September 1927 – 2004) was a Soviet track and field athlete who competed in the javelin throw. She broke the women's javelin throw world record twice in 1949, becoming the first Soviet woman to do so and the first woman to throw beyond fifty metres for the event.

Smirnitskaya was the gold medallist at the 1950 European Athletics Championships and also the 1949 World Festival of Youth and Students. She was a two-time national champion, winning in 1949 and 1950.

== Career ==
=== Early life ===
Born in Ordzhonikidze (now Vladikavkaz) and raised in Pyatigorsk, at the age of fourteen she met Viktor Alexeyev – a national champion in javelin throwing – who had been evacuated there due to World War II. After the end of the war, she later moved to Leningrad and began training with him. Smirnitskaya was the first of Alexeyev's charges to achieve international success and he went on to train many other athletes, including Olympic shot put champions Galina Zybina and Tamara Tyshkevich. She joined Zenit, the sports club associated with the Soviet arms industry.

Smirnitskaya established herself at national level in 1947, with a runner-up finish behind Klavdiya Mayuchaya at the Soviet Athletics Championships. She was again runner-up the following year, this time behind Aleksandra Chudina. Her performances ranked her among the world's best of the period, with 46.07 m (151 ft 1 3/4 in) in 1947 placing her fourth globally and a best of 48.70 m (159 ft 9 1/4 in) moving her to third place for the season.

=== International success ===
She rose to prominence in the 1949 season. She began by breaking the women's javelin throw world record that July, achieving a distance of 49.59 m (162 ft 8 1/4 in) to add nearly a metre on to Austria's Herma Bauma former mark. This marked the first time that a Soviet woman had ever broken that record. A big improvement came in August, as Smirnitskaya threw the implement to a distance of 53.41 m (175 ft 2 3/4 in), making her the first woman to officially throw beyond fifty metres (Mayuchaya had done so unofficially). Her efforts coincided with a period of Soviet success in the women's throws, as Tatyana Sevryukova and Nina Dumbadze had broken the shot put and discus world records the previous year – both being the first Soviets to have that honour.

Smirnitskaya won her first ever national title in the sport that year, throwing the spear 49.99 m (164 ft 0 in). An international title followed at the World Festival of Youth and Students, where she set a meet record of 51.10 m (167 ft 7 3/4 in) to win the gold medal some five metres ahead of runner-up Aleksandra Chudina. This started off a streak of Soviet success at the competition, as a Soviet woman was the winner at each edition until its dissolution in 1962. She retained her national title in 1950 with a throw of 50.98 m (167 ft 3 in) – this was the second best performance in the world that year. The 1950 European Athletics Championships was her first open class, top-level competition and she demonstrated her position as the world's best thrower by winning with three metres to spare over minor medallists Herma Bauma and Galina Zybina. Her throw of 47.55 m (156 ft 0 in) was a championship record.

=== Decline and retirement ===
Smirtnitskaya did not retain her position at the top of the sport in the 1951. First she was defeated by Vera Nabokova at the Soviet Championships. She also lost her title to Nobokova at the World Festival of Youth and Students, finishing third with a comparatively poor performance of 41.89 m (137 ft 5 in) for the bronze medal (Zybina was silver medallist in a Soviet medal sweep). Smirnitskaya's season's best of 51.01 m (167 ft 4 1/4 in) was among the best throws of her career, but was short of Zybina's 1951 world leading mark of 51.45 m (168 ft 9 1/2 in).

Smirnitskaya had a child in 1952 and did not reach the same levels of the sport after that point. After that year she did not throw beyond 50 metres or rank in the top ten globally. Following a best of 48.95 m (160 ft 7 in) in the 1955 season, she retired from javelin throwing. Her world record stood from 5 August 1949 until 5 February 1954, when fellow Soviet Nadezhda Konyayeva added an additional fifteen centimetres. She went on to attend the Lesgaft National State University of Physical Education, Sport and Health and was awarded the USSR Honored Master of Sports in 1957. She was an athletics coach at the Zenit club from 1955 to 1965, then later in her life became a secondary school teacher at High School 161 in Leningrad (later Saint Petersburg).

== National titles ==
- Soviet Athletics Championships
  - Javelin throw: 1949, 1950

== International competitions ==
Year	Competition	Venue	Position	Notes
1949	World Festival of Youth and Students	Budapest, Hungary	1st	51.10 m
1950	European Championships	Brussels, Belgium	1st	47.55 m
1951	World Festival of Youth and Students	East Berlin, East Germany	3rd	41.89

== See also ==
- List of European Athletics Championships medalists (women)
