= Athletics at the 1951 World Festival of Youth and Students =

The 3rd World Festival of Youth and Students featured an athletics competition among its programme of events. The events were contested in East Berlin, East Germany, in August 1951. Mainly contested among Eastern European athletes, it served as an alternative to the more Western European-oriented 1951 Summer International University Sports Week held in Luxembourg the same year.

The calibre of the competition improved at the 3rd edition of the competition, with six athletes successfully returning and defending their titles from the 1949 competition. Among the most prominent of these was Leonid Shcherbakov, the triple jump winner at the 1950 European Athletics Championships a year earlier. European bronze medalist Olli Partanen was runner-up in the discus throw to AAA Championships winner Ferenc Klics.

The 1948 Olympic long jump champion, Olga Gyarmati, won the 200 metres but was defeated in her Olympic event by Aleksandra Chudina, who won four individual titles; her other victories came in the 80 metres hurdles, high jump, and women's pentathlon. The women's throwing events here presaged the 1952 Summer Olympics, as shot put winner Galina Zybina and discus throw champion Nina Ponomaryova added Olympic gold to their World Student titles. Six other medal-winning Soviet athletes reached the Olympic podium the following year: Nadezhda Khnykina, Klavdiya Tochonova, Vladimir Sukharev, Levan Sanadze, Vladimir Kazantsev, and Yuriy Lituyev. The Soviet Union was dominant at the event, winning all but seven of the 34 events on offer.

== Medal summary ==
=== Men ===
Event	Gold		Silver		Bronze	
100 metres	Vladimir Sukharev (URS)	10.6	Levan Sanadze (URS)	10.7	Emil Kiszka (POL)	10.7
200 metres	Vladimir Sukharev (URS)	21.4	Angel Kolev (BUL)	21.8	Zdobysław Stawczyk (POL)	21.9
400 metres	Zoltán Adamik (HUN)	49.1	Ferenc Banhalmi (HUN)	49.1	Sergey Komarov (URS)	49.1
800 metres	Gennadiy Modoy (URS)	1:54.2	Roman Korban (POL)	1:54.5	Pyotr Chevgun (URS)	1:55.3
1500 metres	Václav Čevona (TCH)	3:50.4	Ernő Béres (HUN)	3:50.6	Vilmos Tölgyesi (HUN)	3:52.8
5000 metres	Vladimir Kazantsev (URS)	14:40.0	Ivan Semyonov (URS)	14:50.4	Gyula Pénzes (HUN)	14:50.8
10,000 metres	Ivan Semyonov (URS)	31:40.0	Nikolay Alekseyev (URS)	31:40.6	Nikolay Yevseyev (URS)	31:42.8
3000 metres steeplechase	Vladimir Kazantsev (URS)	8:51.2	Mikhail Saltykov (URS)	8:57.6	Jaroslav Slavíček (TCH)	9:13.8
110 m hurdles	Yevgeniy Bulanchik (URS)	14.4	Timofey Lunyev (URS)	14.5	Milan Tošnar (TCH)	14.6
400 m hurdles	Yuriy Lituyev (URS)	52.3	Timofey Lunyev (URS)	52.7	Igor Ilyin (URS)	53.8
4 × 100 m relay	Soviet Union (URS); Lev Kalyayev; Levan Sanadze; Vladimir Sukharev; Feodosy Golubyev	41.4	Poland (POL); Zygmunt Buhl; Bogdan Lipski; Zdobysław Stawczyk; Emil Kiszka	41.7	Czechoslovakia (TCH); Jiří David; Miroslav Horčic; Rudolf Otava; Miloš Trubl	41.9
4 × 400 m relay	Soviet Union (URS); Pavel Kiyanenko; Sergey Komarov; Yuriy Lituyev; Igor Ilyin	3:16.0	Hungary (HUN); Zoltán Adamik; Ferenc Bánhalmi; Péter Karádi; Egon Solymossy	3:16.8	Poland (POL); Gerard Mach; Bogdan Lipski; Zygmunt Buhl; Roman Korban	3:17.2
High jump	Jiří Lanský (TCH)	1.97 m	Ioan Soter (ROM)	1.97 m	Yevgeniy Vansovich (URS)	1.90 m
Pole vault	Vladimir Brazhnik (URS)	4.20 m	Edward Adamczyk (POL)	4.10 m	Zenon Ważny (POL)	4.10 m
Long jump	Vladimir Kotenkov (URS)	7.32 m	Ödön Földessy (HUN)	7.31 m	Leonid Grigoryev (URS)	7.28 m
Triple jump	Leonid Shcherbakov (URS)	15.09 m	Georg Frister (GDR)	14.73 m	Zygfryd Weinberg (POL)	14.59 m
Shot put	Georgiy Fyodorov (URS)	16.09 m	Otto Grigalka (URS)	15.59 m	Čestmír Kalina (TCH)	15.06 m
Discus throw	Ferenc Klics (HUN)	50.82 m	Olli Partanen (FIN)	47.38 m	Boris Butyenko (URS)	46.63 m
Hammer throw	Nikolay Shorin (URS)	54.84 m	Ádám Bonyhádi (HUN)	53.86 m	Heorhiy Dybenko (URS)	53.32 m
Javelin throw	Janusz Sidło (POL)	66.38 m	Ivan Kaptyukh (URS)	64.35 m	Zbigniew Garncarczyk (POL)	61.91 m
Decathlon	Vladimir Volkov (URS)	7106 pts	Petro Denysenko (URS)	7023 pts	Ernst Schmidt (GDR)	6722 pts

=== Women ===
Event	Gold		Silver		Bronze	
100 metres	Elfriede Preibisch (GDR)	12.0	Sofya Malshina (URS)	12.2	Alice Kockritz (GDR)	12.3
200 metres	Olga Gyarmati (HUN)	25.4	Alice Kockritz (GDR)	25.5	Sofya Malshina (URS)	25.7
400 metres	Zoya Petrova (URS)	56.9	Valentina Bogatiryova (URS)	57.7	Vera Bystrova (URS)	58.4
800 metres	Polina Solopova (URS)	2:15.0	Valentina Pomogayeva (URS)	2:15.0	Klavdiya Dmitruk (URS)	2:16.5
80 m hurdles^{[nb]}	Aleksandra Chudina (URS)	11.4	Galina Yerukhina (URS)	11.5	Olga Gyarmati (HUN)	11.6
4 × 100 m relay	Soviet Union (URS); Aleksandra Chudina; Zoya Dukhovich; Sofiya Malshina; Zinaida Safronova	48.3	Hungary (HUN); Aranka Szabó-Bartha; Olga Gyarmati; Ilona Tolnai-Rákhely; Irén Lohász	48.5	East Germany (GDR); Elfriede Preibisch; Alice Köckritz-Karger; Irmgard Piep; Roselinde Anders	48.7
4 × 200 m relay	East Germany (GDR); Elfriede Preibisch; Alice Köckritz-Karger; Irmgard Piep; Roselinde Anders	1:41.5	Soviet Union (URS); Zoya Dukhovich; Sofiya Malshina; Zinaida Safronova; Zoya Petrova	1:41.7	Hungary (HUN); Aranka Szabó-Bartha; Olga Gyarmati; Ilona Tolnai-Rákhely; Irén Lohász	1:44.2
High jump	Aleksandra Chudina (URS)	1.60 m	Lidiya Chaurskaya (URS)	1.55 m	Mariya Pisareva (URS)	1.50 m
Long jump	Aleksandra Chudina (URS)	5.86 m	Olga Gyarmati (HUN)	5.70 m	Nadezhda Khnykina (URS)	5.52 m
Shot put	Klavdiya Tochonova (URS)	14.48 m	Galina Zybina (URS)	13.83 m	Vera Guchkova (URS)	12.95 m
Discus throw	Nina Ponomaryova (URS)	46.67 m	Yelizaveta Bagriantseva (URS)	45.02 m	Rimma Shumskaya (URS)	41.23 m
Javelin throw	Vera Nobokova (URS)	49.14 m	Galina Zybina (URS)	48.43 m	Natalya Smirnitskaya (URS)	41.89 m
Pentathlon	Aleksandra Chudina (URS)	3999 pts	Nina Tyurkina (URS)	3234 pts	Olga Modrachová (TCH)	3186 pts

- ^{nb} Times possibly wind-assisted

== Medal table ==
Rank	Nation	Gold	Silver	Bronze	Total
1	Soviet Union (URS)	26	19	16	61
2	Hungary (HUN)	3	7	4	14
3	East Germany (GDR)	3	2	7	12
4	Czechoslovakia (TCH)	2	0	5	7
5	Poland (POL)	1	3	6	10
6	Bulgaria (BUL)	0	1	0	1
6	Romania (ROM)	0	1	0	1
Totals (7 entries)		35	33	38	106

== See also ==
- FISU World University Games § Precursors
- University and college sport
