= Athletics at the 1949 World Festival of Youth and Students =

Official poster

The 2nd World Festival of Youth and Students featured an athletics competition among its programme of events. The events were contested in Budapest, Hungary, between 15 and 21 August 1949. Mainly contested among Eastern European athletes, it served as an alternative to the more Western European-oriented 1949 Summer International University Sports Week held in Merano the same year.

The women's events provided the most prominent top level athletes. Hungary's Olga Gyarmati, the reigning long jump champion from the 1948 Summer Olympics, won her specialist event along with a silver medal in the 80 metres hurdles. The 1946 European Championships high jump silver medallist Aleksandra Chudina also won in her speciality and medalled in four other events as well. Several of the competing athletes went on to compete at the 1952 Summer Olympics three years later. A handful of participants were later among the top in their field, including: Leonid Shcherbakov (1950 and 1954 European triple jump winner), Yevgeniy Bulanchik (1954 European hurdles champion) and 1952 Olympic medallists Vladimir Kazantsev, Yuriy Lituyev and Klavdiya Tochonova.

== Medal summary ==
=== Men ===
Event	Gold		Silver		Bronze	
100 metres	Miroslav Horčic (TCH)	10.9	Otto Szebeni (HUN)	10.9	Zdobysław Stawczyk (POL)	10.9
200 metres	Zdobysław Stawczyk (POL)	21.2	Miroslav Horčic (TCH)	21.6	Yves Camus (FRA)	21.6
400 metres	Ferenc Banhalmi (HUN)	49.2	Jean-Paul Martin-du-Gard (FRA)	49.2	Sergey Komarov (URS)	49.8
800 metres	Dumitru Tilmaciu (ROM)	1:54.7	Armand Jacquier (FRA)	1:55.1	Jacques Rasse (FRA)	1:55.9
1500 metres	Sándor Garay (HUN)	3:57.2	Dumitru Tilmaciu (ROM)	3:57.8	Victor Pop (ROM)	4:00.2
5000 metres	Vladimir Kazantsev (URS)	14:55.2	Ivan Semyonov (URS)	14:56.4	Ivan Pozhidayev (URS)	15:03.4
110 m hurdles	Yevgeniy Bulanchik (URS)	14.7	Milan Tosnar (TCH)	15.1	Alois Krul (TCH)	15.3
400 m hurdles	Georges Elloy (FRA)	53.0	Timofey Lunyev (URS)	53.2	Yuriy Lituyev (URS)	53.6^{[nb]}
4 × 100 m relay	Hungary (HUN); László Bartha; György Csányi; Béla Goldoványi; Ottó Szebeni	41.6	Czechoslovakia (TCH); Jaroslav Fikejz; Miroslav Horčic; Jan Schmid; Lubomír Rek Soviet Union (URS); Levan Sanadze; Vladimir Koroyev; Georg Gilde; Vladimir Sukharev	42.0	Not awarded	
4 × 400 m relay	France (FRA); Georges Elloy; Jean-Paul Martin du Gard; Armand Jacquier; Chateau	3:16.6	Soviet Union (URS); Yevhen Bulanchyk; Petro Chevhun; Pavel Kiyanenko; Sergey Komarov	3:17.4	Hungary (HUN); Ferenc Bánhalmi; Péter Karádi; Egon Solymossy; László Marosi	3:17.8
1600 m medley relay (800+400+200+200)	France (FRA); Yves Camus; Jean-Paul Martin du Gard; Jean-Pierre Guillon; Jacques Rasse	3:27.6	Soviet Union (URS); Petro Chevhun; Sergey Komarov; Levan Sanadze; Vladimir Sukharev	3:30.0	Poland (POL); Zygmunt Buhl; Gerard Mach; Zdobysław Stawczyk; Leonard Statkiewicz	3:31.3
High jump	Yuriy Ilyasov (URS)	1.94 m	Ioan Soter (ROM)	1.94 m	German Res (URS)	1.90 m
Pole vault	Viktor Knyatsev (URS)	4.15 m	Georges Breitman (FRA)	4.10 m	Boris Sukharev (URS)	4.00 m
Long jump	Edward Adamczyk (POL)	7.27 m	Vladimir Volkov (URS)	7.14 m	Khandadash Madatov (URS)	7.02 m
Triple jump	Leonid Shcherbakov (URS)	14.56 m	Pierre Pustoch (FRA)	14.55 m	Antal Puskás (HUN)	14.52 m
Shot put	Čestmír Kalina (TCH)	15.10 m	Otto Grigalka (URS)	14.76 m	Boris Butyenko (URS)	14.42 m
Discus throw	Ferenc Klics (HUN)	50.40 m	Jan Kypta (TCH)	44.97 m^{[nb]}	Aladár Kobold (HUN)	44.64 m
Hammer throw	Lajos Petike (HUN)	51.85 m	Constantin Dumitru (ROM)	51.52 m	Arnošt Kadrnožka (TCH)	50.53 m
Javelin throw	Viktor Iyevlev (URS)	65.06 m	Georgiy Lukyanov (URS)	63.97 m	Ivan Kaptyukh (URS)	61.92 m
Decathlon	Petro Denysenko (URS)	7287 pts	Vladimir Volkov (URS)	7026 pts	Viktor Iyevlev (URS)	6940 pts

- ^{[nb]} Exact mark not unverified

=== Women ===
Event	Gold		Silver		Bronze	
100 metres	Zoya Dukhovich (URS)	12.2	Sofya Malshina (URS)	12.3	Irén Lohász (HUN)	12.4
200 metres	Zoya Dukhovich (URS)	25.2	Rosine Faugouin (FRA)	25.3	Inga Zeltinja (URS)	25.5
800 metres	Valentina Bogatiryova (URS)	2:18.0	Lyudmila Sokolova (URS)	2:18.2	Anna Bleha (HUN)	2:18.6
80 m hurdles	L. Kerim-Zade (URS)	11.9	Olga Gyarmati (HUN)	12.0	Aleksandra Chudina (URS)	12.0
4 × 100 m relay	Soviet Union (URS); Aleksandra Chudina; Zoya Dukhovich; Sofiya Malshina; Inga Zeltinja	48.7	Hungary (HUN); Ilona Tolnai-Rákhely; Irén Lohász; Lenke Egri; Margit Bogdan	49.1	France (FRA); Colette Elloy; Jacqueline Artigues; Jacqueline Dufour; Odette Lebré	49.2
4 × 200 m relay	Soviet Union (URS); Aleksandra Chudina; Zoya Dukhovich; Sofiya Malshina; Inga Zeltinja	1:42.3	Hungary (HUN); Olga Gyarmati; Ilona Tolnai-Rákhely; Irén Lohász; Lenke Egri	1:42.8	France (FRA); Colette Elloy; Rosine Faugouin; Jacqueline Dufour; Odette Lebré	1:44.1
High jump	Aleksandra Chudina (URS)	1.62 m	Varvara Papisheva (URS)	1.55 m	Lidiya Borodina (URS)	1.50 m
Long jump	Olga Gyarmati (HUN)	5.95 m	Lyudmila Vasilyeva (URS)	5.80 m	Aleksandra Chudina (URS)	5.66 m
Shot put	Klavdiya Tochonova (URS)	14.29 m	Aleksandra Chudina (URS)	13.61 m	Lyudmila Vasilyeva (URS)	12.97 m
Discus throw	Nina Dumbadze (URS)	51.24 m	Yelizaveta Bagriantseva (URS)	43.28 m	Klavdiya Tochonova (URS)	42.83 m
Javelin throw	Natalya Smirnitskaya (URS)	51.10 m	Aleksandra Chudina (URS)	45.91 m	Mária Rohonczi (HUN)	40.83 m

== Medal table ==
Rank	Nation	Gold	Silver	Bronze	Total
1	Soviet Union (URS)	17	16	15	48
2	Hungary (HUN)	6	4	6	16
3	France (FRA)	3	5	4	12
4	Czechoslovakia (TCH)	2	4	2	8
5	Poland (POL)	2	0	2	4
6	Romania (ROM)	1	3	1	5
Totals (6 entries)		31	32	30	93

== See also ==
- FISU World University Games § Precursors
- University and college sport
