= Athletics at the 1947 World Festival of Youth and Students =

The 1st World Festival of Youth and Students featured an athletics competition among its programme of events. The events were contested in Prague, Czechoslovakia in August 1947. Mainly contested among Eastern European athletes, it served as an alternative to the more Western European-oriented 1947 International University Games held in Paris the same year.

Prominent competitors included Ivan Gubijan, Wacław Kuźmicki and Olga Šicnerová, all of whom later participated at the 1948 Summer Olympics. Double sprint gold medallist Ion Moina's feats later led to the Stadionul Ion Moina being named in his honour. Přemysl Hajný won a shot put and discus throw double in the men's section and later won an Olympic silver medal in ice hockey at the 1948 Winter Olympics. Only one medallist in the women's section was from outside of Poland and Czechoslovakia.

== Medal summary ==
=== Men ===
Event	Gold		Silver		Bronze	
100 metres	Ion Moina (ROM)	10.7	Giuseppe Guzzi (ITA)	10.9	Karel Lambert (TCH)	10.9
200 metres	Ion Moina (ROM)	21.9	Bogdan Lipski (POL)	22.5	Zvonimir Sabolović (YUG)	22.6
400 metres	Zvonimir Sabolović (YUG)	50.4	Zygmunt Buhl (POL)	50.9	Giuseppe Rocca (ITA)	51.0
800 metres	Karel Vomáčka (TCH)	1:57.5	Rinaldo Molina (ITA)	1:59.5	Antonín Bechyne (TCH)	2:00.1
1500 metres	Rinaldo Molina (ITA)	4:11.4	Jaroslav Slavíček (TCH)	4:17.0	Mieczysław Nowak (POL)	4:18.2
5000 metres	Đorđe Stefanović (YUG)	15:29.4	Karel Zabloudil (TCH)	15:41.6	Napoleon Dzwonkowski (POL)	15:41.6
110 m hurdles	Danilo Pacchini (ITA)	15.5	Belul Hatibi (ALB)	16.1	Giuseppe Siletto (ITA)	16.1
4 × 100 m relay	Italy (ITA)	43.7	Poland (POL); Zygmunt Buhl; Bogdan Lipski; Henryk Białkowski; Jerzy Grzanka	44.1	Czechoslovakia (TCH)	44.3
High jump	Ioan Soter (ROM)	1.90 m	Italo Gabbiazzi (ITA)	1.75 m	Wacław Kuźmicki (POL)	1.70 m
Pole vault	Zeno Dragomir (ROM)	3.60 m	Unknown	Unknown	Unknown	Unknown
Long jump	Wacław Kuźmicki (POL)	6.70 m	Karel Hilský (TCH)	6.57 m	Davorin Marčelja (YUG)	6.33 m
Shot put	Přemysl Hajný (TCH)	13.53 m	Eduard Čestr (TCH)	12.81 m	Edward Adamczyk (POL)	12.39 m
Discus throw	Přemysl Hajný (TCH)	40.48 m	Wacław Kuźmicki (POL)	39.06 m	Davorin Marčelja (YUG)	38.58 m
Hammer throw	Jaroslav Knotek (TCH)	54.48 m	Ivan Gubijan (YUG)	50.48 m	Unknown	Unknown
Javelin throw	Mirko Vujačić (YUG)	61.75 m	Ludvík Wunsch (TCH)	57.45 m	Davorin Marčelja (YUG)	55.12 m

=== Women ===
Event	Gold		Silver		Bronze	
100 metres	Olga Šicnerová (TCH)	12.5	Jadwiga Słomczewska (POL)	12.7	Danuše Klesnilová (TCH)	12.8
200 metres	Olga Šicnerová (TCH)	27.1	Jadwiga Słomczewska (POL)	27.5	Wasilewska (POL)	31.0
80 m hurdles	Aniela Mitan (POL)	12.6	Kveta Volšíková (TCH)	12.9	Anna Plšková (TCH)	13.0
4 × 100 m relay	Poland (POL)	52.4	Only one finishing team			
High jump	Kveta Volšíková (TCH)	1.45 m	Aniela Mitan (POL) Olga Modrachová (TCH)	1.40 m	Not awarded	
Long jump	Sona Reichová (TCH)	5.27 m	Danuše Klesnilová (TCH)	5.18 m	Olga Modrachová (TCH)	4.91 m
Shot put	Adéla Machácková (TCH)	11.82 m	Anna Cieślewicz (POL)	11.68 m	Danica Marinček (YUG)	11.04 m
Discus throw	Hana Ženíšková (TCH)	34.38 m	Adéla Machácková (TCH)	33.43 m	Helena Stachowicz (POL)	33.23 m
Javelin throw	Helena Stachowicz (POL)	38.26 m	Marta Komínová (TCH)	29.16 m	Hana Ženíšková (TCH)	26.50 m

== Medal table ==
Rank	Nation	Gold	Silver	Bronze	Total
1	Czechoslovakia (TCH)	10	10	7	27
2	Poland (POL)	4	8	6	18
3	Romania (ROM)	4	0	0	4
4	Italy (ITA)	3	3	2	8
5	Yugoslavia (YUG)	3	1	5	9
6	Albania (ALB)	0	1	0	1
Totals (6 entries)		24	23	20	67

== See also ==
- FISU World University Games § Precursors
- University and college sport
