= Kirsti Jordet =

Norwegian athlete (1932–2019)

Kirsti Jordet (12 May 1932 – 19 April 2019) was a Norwegian athlete. She won fourteen national titles in a variety of events, and competed at one European Championships.

== Personal life ==
She was from Tufsingdalen in Os i Østerdalen. At the age of 16, she moved to Orkdal to attend Orkdal Landsgymnas.

== Career ==
She became the first woman to win the King's Cup, an award to the best overall performer at the Norwegian championships. She won back-to-back King's Cups in 1949 and 1950. She started 1949 by winning the standing high jump and the standing long jump at the Norwegian Standing Jumps Championship. At the Main Championships, she took the high jump as well as shot put–defending the latter title in 1950. Reporters noted Jordet's use of a sleeping bag to keep warmed up between jumps.

With 1.50 in the high jump from 1950, she was the first Norwegian woman to clear that barrier. This was her only national record in a jumping event, which was beat by Unni Sæther less than a month later. She finished tenth at the pentathlon and twelfth in the javelin throw at the 1950 European Championships. Kirsti Jordet also took the national title in the javelin throw in 1950. She held the Norwegian record in this event from 1950 to 1952, throwing 39.95 metres at Trondheim Stadium. She also won the triathlon event—100 metres, discus throw and high jump—in 1951, where she previously had one silver and bronze each. After that, she would be mostly successful in the rotating throws.

Discus throw became her main event from 1951. After taking the national silver in 1950, she swept the Norwegian Championships in 1951, 1952, 1953, 1954 and 1956. She set two Norwegian records in the summer of 1952, first 39.35 metres and then 40.20 metres, a record that lasted until 1958. Having got Stein Johnson to coach her, she was capable of the lengths to qualify for the 1952 Olympics, but failed at the qualification, having a series of invalid throws. In 1951, slingball was inaugurated as a national championship event, and Jordet took the first two national titles. She set Norwegian records in 1951, throwing the 1-kilogram implement 43.93 metres to overcome Grethe Werner's record, and following other intermittent records Jordet threw 48.58 metres in August 1956. The record lasted for one month; the event was then discontinued.

From 1951 to 1957, Jordet won nine silver and eight bronze at the Norwegian championships in triathlon, pentathlon, high jump, standing long jump, shot put and javelin throw. She represented the clubs IL Follogutane, from 1953 Røros IL and from 1954 IL i BUL.

== Professional career ==
Jordet was educated as a schoolteacher. In 1952 she was hired as a teacher in Brekken, having worked at a school that was closed due to its diminutive size. In addition to working at several schools, she had stints in the cultural preservation departments of Hedmark County Municipality, Sør-Trøndelag County Municipality and Tromsø Municipality.

She also chaired the Nord-Østerdal District Association of the Athletics Federation (Nord-Østerdal friidrettskrets from 1961 to 1964.

As a pensioner, she was preoccupied with cultural heritage in Os and Tolga, among others writing a book about Holøydalen Church and paid out of her own pocket for new windows in Vingelen Church. She died in April 2019 in Vingelen.
