= Peter Kraus (disambiguation) =

Peter Kraus (born 1939) is an Austrian singer and actor.

Peter Kraus or Krause may also refer to:

- Peter Kraus (field hockey) (1941–2024), German field hockey player
- Peter Kraus (athlete) (1932–2016), German Olympic sprinter
- Peter S. Kraus, American businessman, philanthropist and art collector
- Peter Krause (born 1965), American television and film actor
- Peter Krause (artist), American comic book artist
- Peter Kraus, a contestant on The Bachelorette

== See also ==
- Peter Krausz (born 1946), Romanian-born Canadian artist
