= Turakainen =

Turakainen is a surname. Notable people with the surname include:

- Adolf Turakainen (1932–1996), Finnish sprinter
- Elsa Turakainen (1904–1992), Finnish actress
