= 1946 European Athletics Championships – Women's javelin throw =

Women's javelin throw at the European Athletics Championships

The women's javelin throw at the 1946 European Athletics Championships was held in Oslo, Norway, at Bislett Stadion on 24 August 1946.

== Medalists ==
Gold	Klavdiya Mayuchaya; Soviet Union
Silver	Lyudmila Anokina; Soviet Union
Bronze	Johanna Koning; Netherlands

== Results ==
=== Final ===
24 August

Rank	Name	Nationality	Result	Notes
1st place, gold medalist(s)	Klavdiya Mayuchaya	Soviet Union	46.25	CR
2nd place, silver medalist(s)	Lyudmila Anokina	Soviet Union	45.84	
3rd place, bronze medalist(s)	Johanna Koning	Netherlands	43.24	
4	Elly Dammers	Netherlands	41.16	
5	Mária Rohonczi	Hungary	40.66	
6	Maria Kwaśniewska	Poland	38.57	
7	Regina Marjanen	Finland	36.34	
8	Helena Stachowicz	Poland	35.52	

=== Qualification ===
24 August

Rank	Name	Nationality	Result	Notes
1	Klavdiya Mayuchaya	Soviet Union	45.90	CR, Q
2	Johanna Koning	Netherlands	44.28	Q
3	Lyudmila Anokina	Soviet Union	39.74	Q
4	Maria Kwaśniewska	Poland	37.39	Q
5	Mária Rohonczi	Hungary	37.04	Q
6	Regina Marjanen	Finland	36.59	Q
7	Elly Dammers	Netherlands	36.34	Q
8	Helena Stachowicz	Poland	36.21	Q
9	Stella Møllgaard	Denmark	35.31	
10	Dagny Carlsson	Sweden	35.28	
11	Matild Regdanszky	Hungary	34.91	
12	Anne Marie Opsann	Norway	29.94	
13	Kathleen Dyer-Tilley	Great Britain	26.05	

== Participation ==
According to an unofficial count, 13 athletes from 9 countries participated in the event.

- Denmark (1)
- Finland (1)
- Hungary (2)
- Netherlands (2)
- Norway (1)
- Poland (2)
- Soviet Union (2)
- Sweden (1)
- Great Britain (1)
