= 1950 European Athletics Championships – Women's javelin throw =

Women's javelin throw at the European Athletics Championships

The women's javelin throw at the 1950 European Athletics Championships was held in Brussels, Belgium, at Heysel Stadium on 23 August 1950.

== Medalists ==
Gold	Natalya Smirnitskaya; Soviet Union
Silver	Herma Bauma; Austria
Bronze	Galina Zybina; Soviet Union

== Results ==
=== Final ===
23 August

Rank	Name	Nationality	Result	Notes
1st place, gold medalist(s)	Natalya Smirnitskaya	Soviet Union	47.55	CR
2nd place, silver medalist(s)	Herma Bauma	Austria	43.87	
3rd place, bronze medalist(s)	Galina Zybina	Soviet Union	42.75	
4	Vera Nabokova	Soviet Union	41.88	
5	Dana Zátopková	Czechoslovakia	41.34	
6	Lily Kelsby	Denmark	40.25	
7	Marija Radosavljević	Yugoslavia	38.33	
8	Ingrid Almqvist	Sweden	38.21	
9	Ans Koning	Netherlands	38.20	
10	Diane Coates	Great Britain	37.50	
11	Evelyne Pinard	France	37.22	
12	Kirsti Jordet	Norway	34.87	
13	Eivor Olson	Sweden	34.85	

== Participation ==
According to an unofficial count, 13 athletes from 10 countries participated in the event.

- Austria (1)
- Czechoslovakia (1)
- Denmark (1)
- France (1)
- Netherlands (1)
- Norway (1)
- Soviet Union (3)
- Sweden (2)
- Great Britain (1)
- Yugoslavia (1)
