= Klavdiya Mayuchaya =

Soviet athletics competitor

Personal information
- Born: 15 May 1918 Saransk, Russian SFSR
- Died: 14 October 1989 (aged 71) Moscow, Soviet Union

Sport
- Sport: Athletics
- Events: Javelin throw, shot put, discus throw
- Club: Burevestnik Moscow (1936–45); Dynamo Moscow (1945–54)
- Coached by: Dmitry Markov

Achievements and titles
- Personal bests: JT – 50.32 m (1947); SP – 12.02 m (1937); DT – 43.40 m (1945)
Medal record
Women's athletics
Representing the Soviet Union
European Championships
Gold medal – first place	1946 Oslo	Javelin throw

Klavdiya Yakovlevna Mayuchaya (née Lapteva; Russian: Клавдия Яковлевна Маючая (Лаптева); 15 May 1918 – 14 October 1989) was a Soviet track and field athlete who competed mainly in the javelin throw. She was the gold medallist in the event at the European Athletics Championships in 1946 and was the first woman to throw the javelin beyond fifty metres. She was a nine-time Soviet champion across the javelin, discus throw and grenade throw disciplines.

== Career ==
=== Early career ===
Mayuchaya joined the Burevestnik sports club in Moscow in 1936 and practised throwing there until in 1945, when she changed to the Dynamo Sports Club and worked with coach Dmitry Markov until the end of her career. Initially a shot putter, she soon focused more on the javelin throw. Her throw of 41.58 m (136 ft 5 in) in 1938 ranked her in the top ten in the world that year and she won her first national title in the discipline at that year's Soviet Athletics Championships. The following year she defended that title and also improved her best to 45.88 m (150 ft 6 1/4 in) – a mark only bettered by Olympic medallist Luise Krüger that season.

After dropping down the rankings from 1940 to 1942, she returned to the high level of the sport with a throw of 44.14 m (144 ft 9 3/4 in) (fourth in the seasonal rankings) and a third Soviet javelin title. In 1944 she was again ranked fourth internationally and won another national title. She edged close to her best in the 1945 with a throw of 45.41 m (148 ft 11 3/4 in), which was the second best that season after national rival Lyudmila Anokina. She also had her best season in the discus throw that year, with her mark of 43.40 m (142 ft 4 1/2 in) being a lifetime best and second in the international rankings behind Nina Dumbadze. At the national championships, she was third in the javelin but won her first discus national title.

=== European champion and unofficial world record ===
Mayuchaya won her first and only major international title in the 1946 season. She was the foremost javelin athlete that season through her new best of 48.37 m (158 ft 8 1/4 in) set that July. At the 1946 European Athletics Championships she threw a championship record of 46.25 m (151 ft 8 3/4 in) to claim the gold medal ahead of fellow Soviet Lyudmila Anokina. She was part of a Soviet medal sweep of the women's throws, alongside Tatyana Sevryokova and Nina Dumbadze. At the Soviet Championships she won both the javelin and grenade throw events.

Her physical peak came in September 1947, when she throw a lifetime best of 50.32 m (165 ft 1 in) for the javelin. This made her the first woman ever to throw the implement beyond fifty metres, although it was not officially recognised as the women's javelin throw world record due to the Soviet Union not being a registered member of the International Amateur Athletics Federation. It was not until 1949 that the official world record was brought beyond fifty metres; Natalya Smirnitskaya achieved that feat with a throw of 53.41 m (175 ft 2 3/4 in). She won her sixth and final javelin title at the 1947 Soviet Championships, which was also the last of her nine national titles across the throws.

=== Final years ===
After 1947, the standard of women's throwing in the Soviet Union increased and Mayuchaya faced competition from Smirnitskaya, Galina Zybina and Aleksandra Chudina, among others. She still regularly ranked within the world's top ten from 1948 to 1953. The last national podium finish of her career came in 1952, when she was runner-up to Zybina in the javelin. She came close to clearing fifty metres again that season, with a throw of 49.90 m (163 ft 8 1/2 in). In her last season of competition in 1954, at the age of 36, she threw 45.88 m (150 ft 6 1/4 in) and ranked 16th in the world.

== Personal bests ==
- Javelin throw: 50.32 m (165 ft 1 in) (1947)
- Discus throw: 43.40 m (142 ft 4 1/2 in) (1945)
- Shot put: 12.02 m (39 ft 5 in) (1937)

== National titles ==
- Soviet Athletics Championships
  - Javelin throw: 1938, 1939, 1943, 1944, 1946, 1947
  - Discus throw: 1945
  - Grenade throw: 1938, 1946
