= Zdobysław Stawczyk =

Polish sprinter

Personal information
- Nationality: Polish
- Born: 1 June 1923 Częstochowa, Poland
- Died: 1 September 2005 (aged 82) Poznań, Poland
- Height: 1.70 m (5 ft 7 in)
- Weight: 69 kg (152 lb)

Sport
- Sport: Sprinting
- Event: 200 metres
- Club: Victoria Częstochowa; AZS Poznań

Zdobysław Stawczyk (1 June 1923 – 1 September 2005) was a Polish sprinter. He competed in the men's 200 metres at the 1952 Summer Olympics.

== International competitions ==
Year	Competition	Venue	Position	Event	Notes
Representing Poland
1949	World Festival of Youth and Students	Budapest, Hungary	3rd	100 m	10.9
1949	World Festival of Youth and Students	Budapest, Hungary	1st	200 m	21.2
1949	World Festival of Youth and Students	Budapest, Hungary	3rd	Medley relay	3:31.3
1951	World Festival of Youth and Students	East Berlin, East Germany	2nd	4 × 100 m relay	41.7
1952	Olympic Games	Helsinki, Finland	20th (qf)	200 m	22.12
1952	Olympic Games	Helsinki, Finland	9th (sf)	4 × 100 m relay	41.91
1954	World Student Games	Budapest, Hungary	1st	100 m	10.6
1954	World Student Games	Budapest, Hungary	1st	200 m	21.5
1954	World Student Games	Budapest, Hungary	2nd	4 × 100 m relay	41.4
1954	European Championships	Bern, Switzerland	15th (sf)	100 m	11.0
1954	European Championships	Bern, Switzerland	4th (h)	200 m	21.5
1954	European Championships	Bern, Switzerland	9th (h)	4 × 100 m relay	41.5

== Personal bests ==
- 100 metres – 10.6h (1949)
- 200 metres – 21.4h (1954)
