= Rafiu Oluwa =

Nigerian sprinter (1931–2009)

Personal information
- Nationality: Nigerian
- Born: 1 January 1931
- Died: 27 August 2009 (aged 78) Lagos, Nigeria

Sport
- Sport: Sprinting
- Event: 200 metres
- Club: L.A.C.

Rafiu Adio Oluwa (1 January 1931 – 27 August 2009) was a Nigerian sprinter. He competed in the men's 200 metres at the 1952 Summer Olympics. He was interred at Ikoyi Cemetery.
