= Zygmunt Buhl =

Polish sprinter

Personal information
- Nationality: Polish
- Born: 24 January 1927 Bydgoszcz, Poland
- Died: 28 September 1978 (aged 51) Warsaw, Poland
- Height: 1.79 m (5 ft 10 in)
- Weight: 76 kg (168 lb)

Sport
- Sport: Sprinting
- Event: 100 metres
- Club: HKS Bydgoszcz (1945–1947); AZS Szczecin (1948–1949); Ogniwo Kraków (1950); Gwardia-Wisła Kraków (1951–1958)

Zygmunt Buhl (24 January 1927 – 28 September 1978) was a Polish sprinter. He competed in the men's 4 × 100 metres relay at the 1952 Summer Olympics.

He died in a car crash on 28 September 1978.

== International competitions ==
| Year | Competition | Venue | Position | Event | Notes |
Representing Poland
| 1947 | World Festival of Youth and Students | Prague, Czechoslovakia | 2nd | 400 m | 50.9 |
| 1947 | World Festival of Youth and Students | Prague, Czechoslovakia | 2nd | 4 × 100 m relay | 44.1 |
| 1949 | World Festival of Youth and Students | Budapest, Hungary | 3rd | Medley relay | 3:31.3 |
| 1951 | World Festival of Youth and Students | East Berlin, East Germany | 2nd | 4 × 100 m relay | 41.7 |
| 1951 | World Festival of Youth and Students | East Berlin, East Germany | 3rd | 4 × 400 m relay | 3:17.2 |
| 1952 | Olympic Games | Helsinki, Finland | 9th (sf) | 4 × 100 metres relay | 41.91 |

== Personal bests ==
- 100 metres – 10.7h (Kraków 1950)
- 200 metres – 22.1h (Wrocław 1953)
- Long jump – 6.81 (Kraków 1950)
