= Emil Kiszka =

Polish sprinter (1926–2007)

Personal information
- Nationality: Polish
- Born: 5 December 1926 Knurów, Poland
- Died: 9 February 2007 (aged 80) Hürth, Germany
- Height: 1.76 m (5 ft 9 in)
- Weight: 76 kg (168 lb)

Sport
- Sport: Sprinting
- Event: 100 metres
- Club: Unia Krywałd

Emil Kiszka (5 December 1926 – 9 February 2007) was a Polish sprinter. He competed in the men's 100 metres at the 1952 Summer Olympics.

== Competition record ==
Year	Competition	Venue	Position	Event	Notes
Representing Poland
1950	European Championships	Brussels, Belgium	4th	100 m	10.7
1951	World Festival of Youth and Students	East Berlin, East Germany	3rd	100 m	10.7
1951	World Festival of Youth and Students	East Berlin, East Germany	2nd	4 × 100 m relay	41.7
1952	Olympic Games	Helsinki, Finland	26th (h)	100 m	11.13
1952	Olympic Games	Helsinki, Finland	9th (sf)	4 × 100 m relay	41.91
1954	World Student Games	Budapest, Hungary	4th	100 m	10.8
1954	World Student Games	Budapest, Hungary	2nd	4 × 100 m relay	41.4
1954	European Championships	Bern, Switzerland	7th (h)	4 × 400 m relay	3:13.1
1955	World Festival of Youth and Students	Warsaw, Poland	11th (h)	100 m	11.1
1955	World Festival of Youth and Students	Warsaw, Poland	3rd	4 × 100 m relay	40.9

== Personal bests ==
- 100 metres – 10.5h (Kraków 1950)
- 200 metres – 22.0h (Warsaw 1952)
- Long jump – 7.32 (Warsaw 1950)
