= Ernst Mühlethaler =

Swiss sprinter

Personal information
- Nationality: Swiss
- Born: 17 April 1922
- Died: 2012 (aged 89–90)

Sport
- Sport: Sprinting
- Event: 200 metres

Ernst Mühlethaler (17 April 1922 – 2012) was a Swiss sprinter. He competed in the men's 200 metres at the 1952 Summer Olympics.
