= Roman Korban =

Polish middle-distance runner (1927–2024)

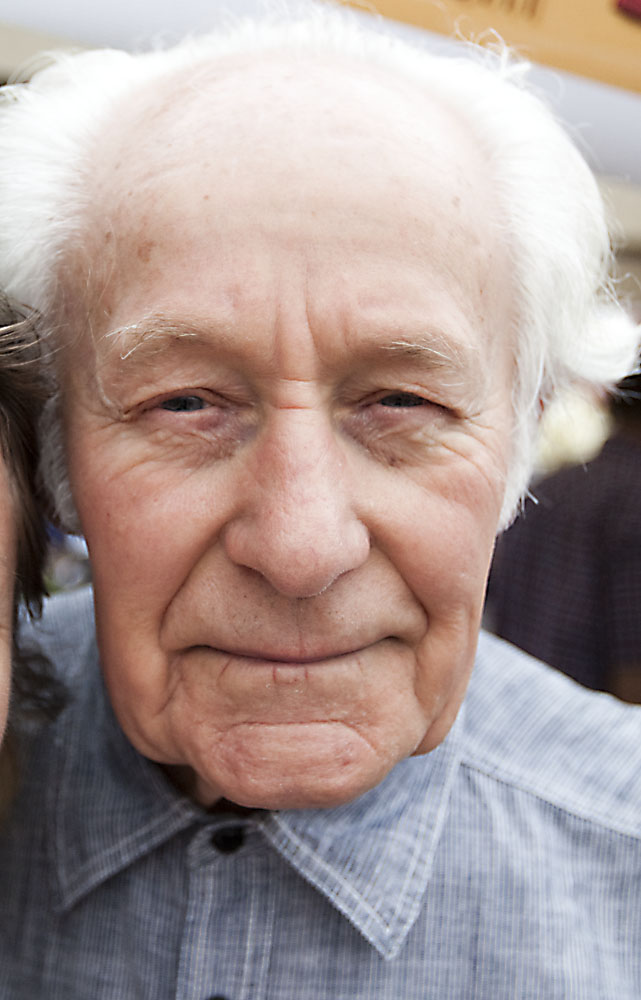
- Korban in 2011

Personal information
- Nationality: Polish
- Born: 23 May 1927 Nadwórna, Poland (modern-day Ukraine)
- Died: 15 January 2024 (aged 96) Sydney, New South Wales, Australia
- Height: 1.71 m (5 ft 7 in)
- Weight: 60 kg (132 lb)

Sport
- Sport: Middle-distance running
- Event: 800 metres
- Club: OMTUR Gdynia (1947); Zryw Gdańsk (1948); Spójnia Gdańsk (1949–1953)

Roman Korban (23 May 1927 – 15 January 2024) was a Polish middle-distance runner. He competed in the men's 800 metres at the 1952 Summer Olympics. Korban died on 15 January 2024, at the age of 96.

== International competitions ==
Year	Competition	Venue	Position	Event	Notes
Representing Poland
1951	World Festival of Youth and Students	East Berlin, East Germany	2nd	800 m	1:54.5
1951	World Festival of Youth and Students	East Berlin, East Germany	3rd	4 × 400 m relay	3:17.2
1952	Olympic Games	Helsinki, Finland	28th (h)	800 m	1:54.7

== Personal bests ==
- 400 metres – 50.1h (Warsaw 1953)
- 800 metres – 1:51.8h (Moscow 1951)
- 1000 metres – 2:27.0h (Zabrze 1953)
- 1500 metres – 3:55.8h (Warsaw 1953)
