= 1st World Festival of Youth and Students =

1947 youth festival in Prague, Czechoslovak Republic

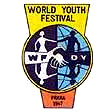
- Host country: Czechoslovak Republic
- Dates: 25 July - 20 August 1947
- Motto: Youth Unite, Forward for Lasting Peace!
- Cities: Prague
- Participants: 17,000 people from 72 countries
- Follows: 2nd World Festival of Youth and Students

The 1st World Festival of Youth and Students (WFYS) was held from 25 July to 20 August 1947 in Prague, capital city of the then Czechoslovak Republic.

== Organisation and events ==
The World Federation of Democratic Youth had decided to celebrate its first festival there in remembrance of the events of October and November 1939, when thousands of young Czechs rose in demonstrations against the occupation of the country by Nazi Germany. This caused a wave of repression that included the closing of all the superior schools, the arrest of more than 1850 students, and the internment of 1200 in the Nazi concentration camps. The WFYS also paid tribute to the Czech villages of Lidice and Ležáky, which were eradicated as a response to the assassination of the German governor Reinhard Heydrich, nicknamed The Butcher of Prague.

The WFYS was officially inaugurated before a crowd of 17,000 at Strahov Stadium on the afternoon of 25 July 1947. The blue flag with the emblem of the World Federation of Democratic Youth was raised and, for the first time, the Song of Democratic Youth, composed by Anatoli Novikov with lyrics by Lev Oshanin, was heard.

This was the longest Festival in its history, lasting almost four weeks. Among the sporting events was an athletics competition.

The motto of the festival was Youth Unite, Forward for Lasting Peace!.
