= Wacław Kuźmicki =

Polish decathlete

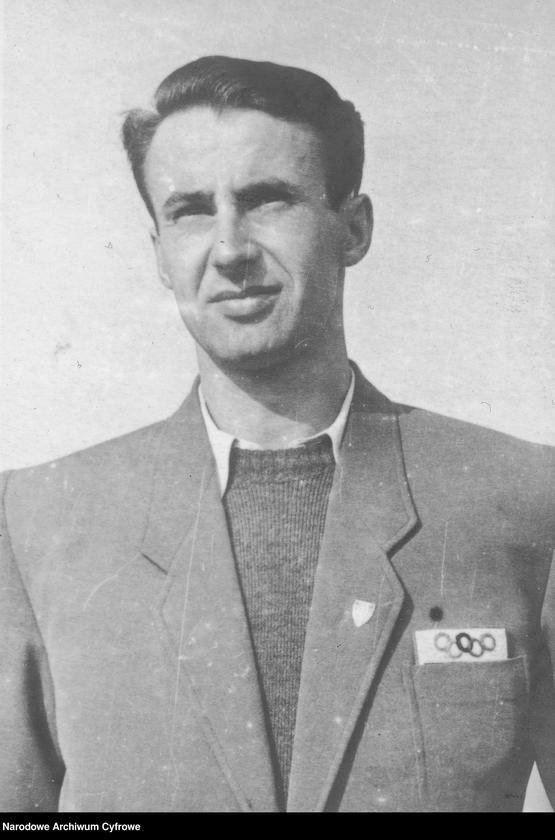
- Wacław Kuźmicki in 1948

Personal information
- Nationality: Polish
- Born: 27 April 1921 Bacieczki (now part of Białystok), Poland
- Died: 19 August 2013 (aged 92) Katowice, Poland
- Height: 1.82 m (6 ft 0 in)
- Weight: 81 kg (179 lb)

Sport
- Sport: Athletics
- Event: Decathlon
- Club: Jagiellonia Białystok (1945), łódzk Dziewiarski KS Łódź (1946–1947); ŁKS Włókniarz Łódź (1947–1949); AKS Budowlani Chorzów (1950–1952); Unia Chorzów (1953)

Wacław Kuźmicki (April 27, 1921 – August 19, 2013) was a Polish decathlete who competed at the 1948 Summer Olympics in London, where he finished 16th in a field of 35 competitors. He was born in Osiedle Bacieczki, Białystok and attended the Warsaw School of Economics from 1945-1949. During that time he participated in the 1946 European Athletics Championships in Oslo, finishing 10th among 16 athletes, as well as the 1947 and 1949 editions of the World Student Games, winning the long jump event at the earlier tournament. By the time of his 1953 retirement he had been the Polish national pentathlon champion twice (1947 and 1950) and the national triple jump champion once (1947). Following his retirement from active competition, due to injuries, he took up coaching, working for several clubs as well as the national team. He also served as a judge for international athletic competitions and, for his service in this field, was made a member of the Order of Polonia Restituta, Knight's Cross. He was married to fellow athlete Irene Hejducka until her death in 2008 and lived in Katowice until his own death. He was the last surviving member of the Polish delegation to the 1948 Summer Olympics.

== International competitions ==
Year	Competition	Venue	Position	Event	Notes
Representing Poland
1946	European Championships	Oslo, Norway	10th	Decathlon	5602 pts
1947	World Festival of Youth and Students	Prague, Czechoslovakia	3rd	High jump	1.70 m
1947	World Festival of Youth and Students	Prague, Czechoslovakia	1st	Long jump	6.70 m
1947	World Festival of Youth and Students	Prague, Czechoslovakia	2nd	Discus throw	39.06 m
1948	Olympic Games	London, United Kingdom	16th	Decathlon	6153 pts

== Personal bests ==
- 110 metres hurdles – 17.2 seconds (Warsaw 1948)
- High jump – 1.80 metres (Łódź 1947)
- Shot put – 14.80 metres (Katowice 1949)
- Javelin throw (old model) – 54.86 metres (Warsaw 1948)
- Decathlon – 6153 points (London 1948)
