= Eom Par-yong =

South Korean sprinter

Eom Par-Yong
Personal information
- Nationality: South Korean
- Born: 9 July 1931 South Korea
- Died: 24 January 1995 (aged 63)

Sport
- Sport: Sprinting
- Event: 200 metres

- Korean name
- Hangul: 엄팔용
- RR: Eom Palyong
- MR: Ŏm P'aryong

Eom Par-Yong or Um Pal-Yong (9 July 1931 – 24 January 1995) was a South Korean sprinter. He competed in the men's 200 metres at the 1952 Summer Olympics.
