= Roman Budzyński =

Polish sprinter

Personal information
- Nationality: Polish
- Born: 23 September 1933 Poznań, Poland
- Died: 1994 or 17 January 1999
- Height: 1.77 m (5 ft 10 in)
- Weight: 67 kg (148 lb)

Sport
- Sport: Sprinting
- Event: 200 metres
- Club: Ogniwo Poznań (1950–1952); OWKS Bydgoszcz (1953); CWKS Warsaw (1954); CWKS Bydgoszcz (1955); Warta Poznań (1958)

Roman Budzyński (23 September 1933 – 14 January 1994 or 17 January 1999) was a Polish sprinter. He competed in the men's 200 metres at the 1952 Summer Olympics.

He died on 14 January 1994 or 17 January 1999

== International competitions ==
Year	Competition	Venue	Position	Event	Notes
Representing Poland
1952	Olympic Games	Helsinki, Finland	31st (qf)	200 m	22.51

== Personal bests ==
- 100 metres – 10.9h (Kraków 1952)
- 200 metres – 22.0h (1959)
