= Werner Zandt =

German sprinter

Personal information
- Nationality: German
- Born: 20 October 1927 Stuttgart, Germany
- Died: 13 October 2009 (aged 81)

Sport
- Sport: Sprinting
- Event: 100 metres
- Club: Stuttgarter Kickers

Werner Zandt (20 October 1927 – 13 October 2009) was a German sprinter. He competed in the men's 100 metres at the 1952 Summer Olympics.

== Competition record ==
Year	Competition	Venue	Position	Event	Notes
Representing Germany
1952	Olympics	Helsinki, Finland	4th, Qtr 3	100 m	10.98/10.8
