= James Gathers =

American sprinter

Olympic medal record

Men's Athletics

Representing United States
Bronze medal – third place	1952 Helsinki	200 metres

James Gathers (June 17, 1930 – June 1, 2002) was an American athlete who competed mainly in the 200 metres. He competed for the United States in the 1952 Summer Olympics held in Helsinki, Finland in the 200 metres where he won the bronze medal.
