= Vingelen Church =

Church in Innlandet, Norway

- Vingelen kirke
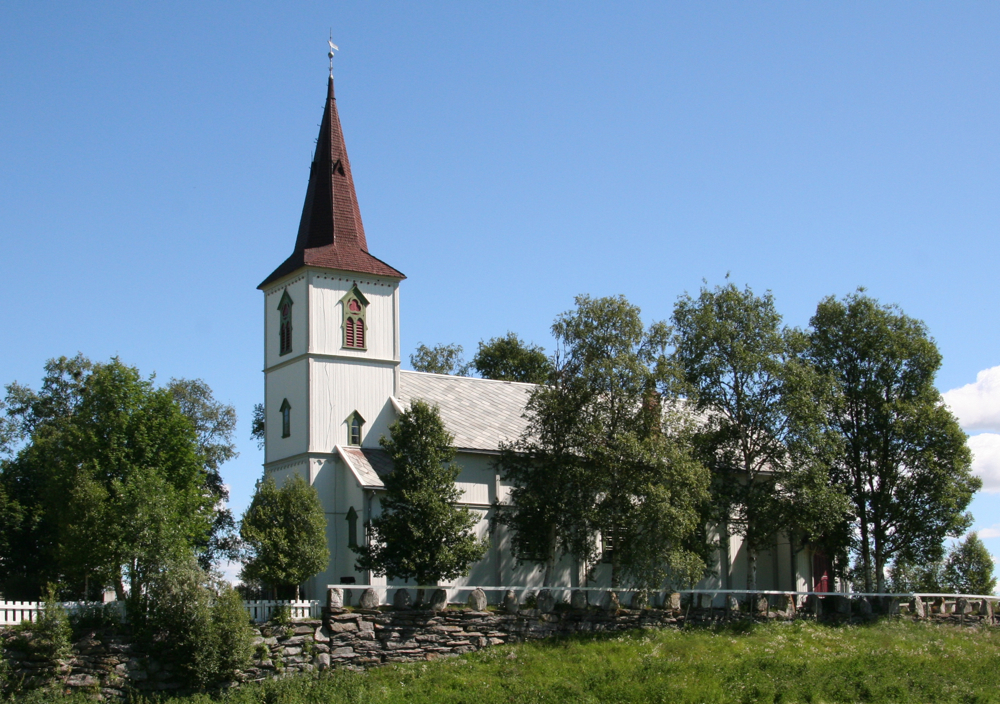
- View of the church
- Vingelen Church
- 62°25′02″N 10°51′59″E
- Location: Tolga Municipality, Innlandet
- Country: Norway
- Denomination: Church of Norway
- Churchmanship: Evangelical Lutheran

History
- Status: Parish church
- Founded: 16th century
- Consecrated: 17 November 1880

Architecture
- Functional status: Active
- Architect: Henrik Nissen
- Architectural type: Long church
- Completed: 1880 (146 years ago)

Specifications
- Capacity: 230
- Materials: Wood

Administration
- Diocese: Hamar bispedømme
- Deanery: Nord-Østerdal prosti
- Parish: Vingelen
- Norwegian Cultural Heritage Site
- Type: Church
- Status: Listed
- ID: 85849

Vingelen Church (Norwegian: Vingelen kirke) is a parish church of the Church of Norway in Tolga Municipality in Innlandet county, Norway. It is located in the village of Vingelen. It is the church for the Vingelen parish which is part of the Nord-Østerdal prosti (deanery) in the Diocese of Hamar. The white, wooden church was built in a long church design in 1880 using plans drawn up by the architect Henrik Nissen. The church seats about 230 people.

== History ==
The earliest existing historical records of the church date back to the 1590s, but the church was not built at that time. The first church in Vingelen was a wooden stave church that was possibly built during the 16th century. The church was originally located about 750 metres (2,460 ft) west of the present church site. In 1658, a new timber-framed long church with an onion dome was built about 750 metres (2,460 ft) to the east (just west of the present church site). This new church was called the Trefoldighetskirken which means "Trinity Church". After the new church was built, the old church was torn down. In 1882, a new long church was built a few meters to the east of the old Trinity Church. The new church was designed by Henrik Nissen and the lead builder was Hans Johnsen. After the new neo-Gothic, Swiss chalet style building was completed, the old church was torn down. The new church was consecrated on 17 November 1880.

== Media gallery ==
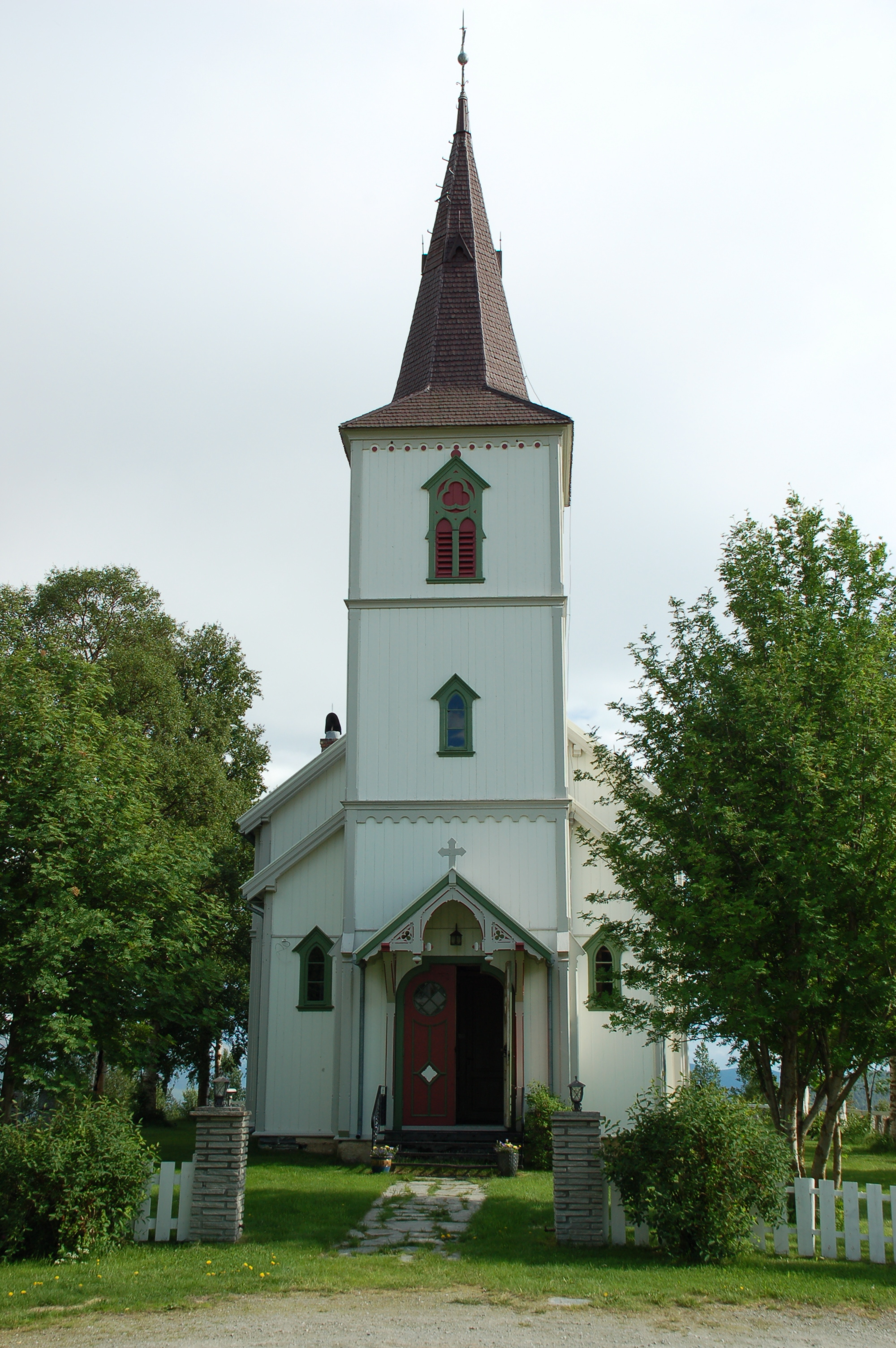

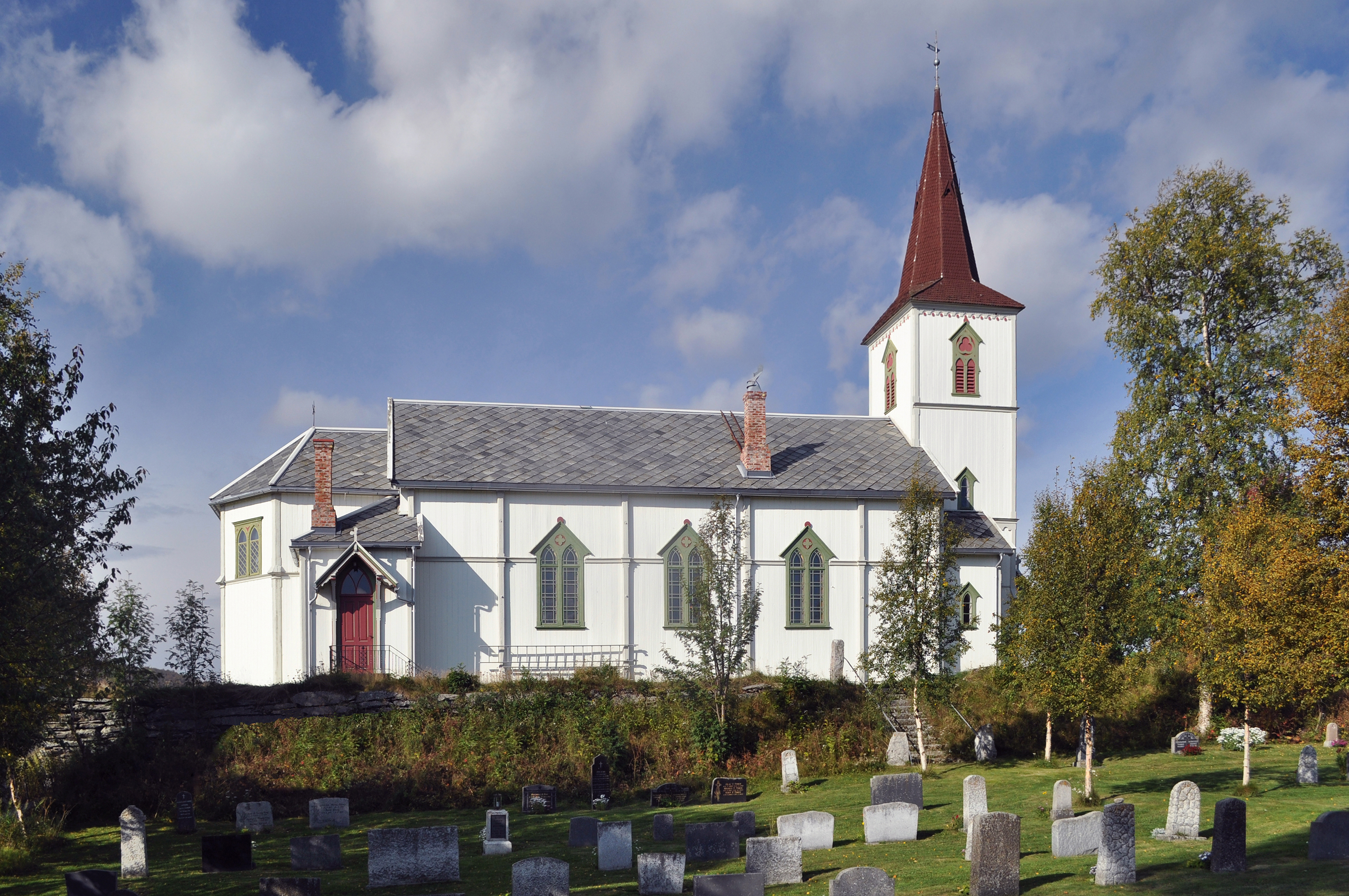

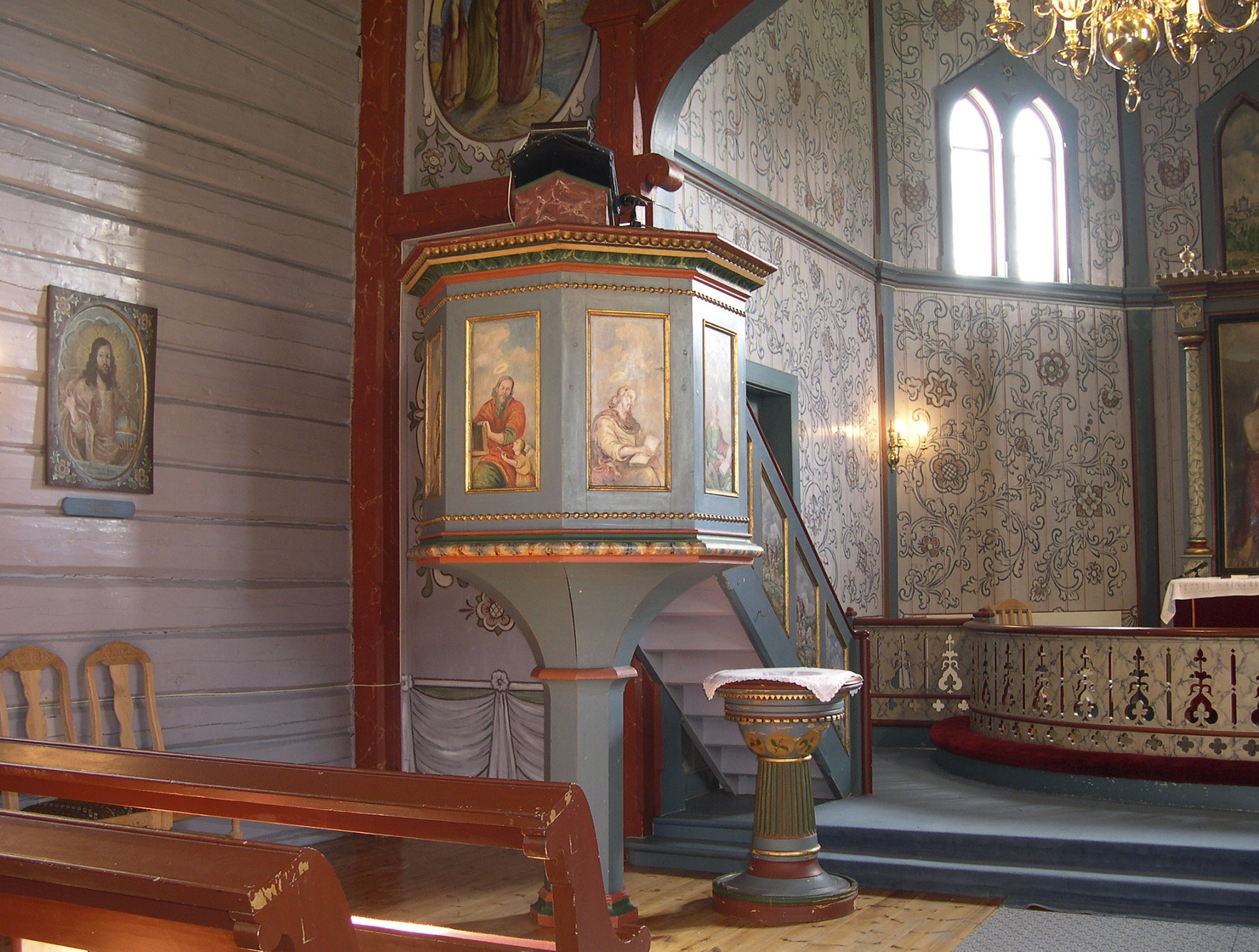

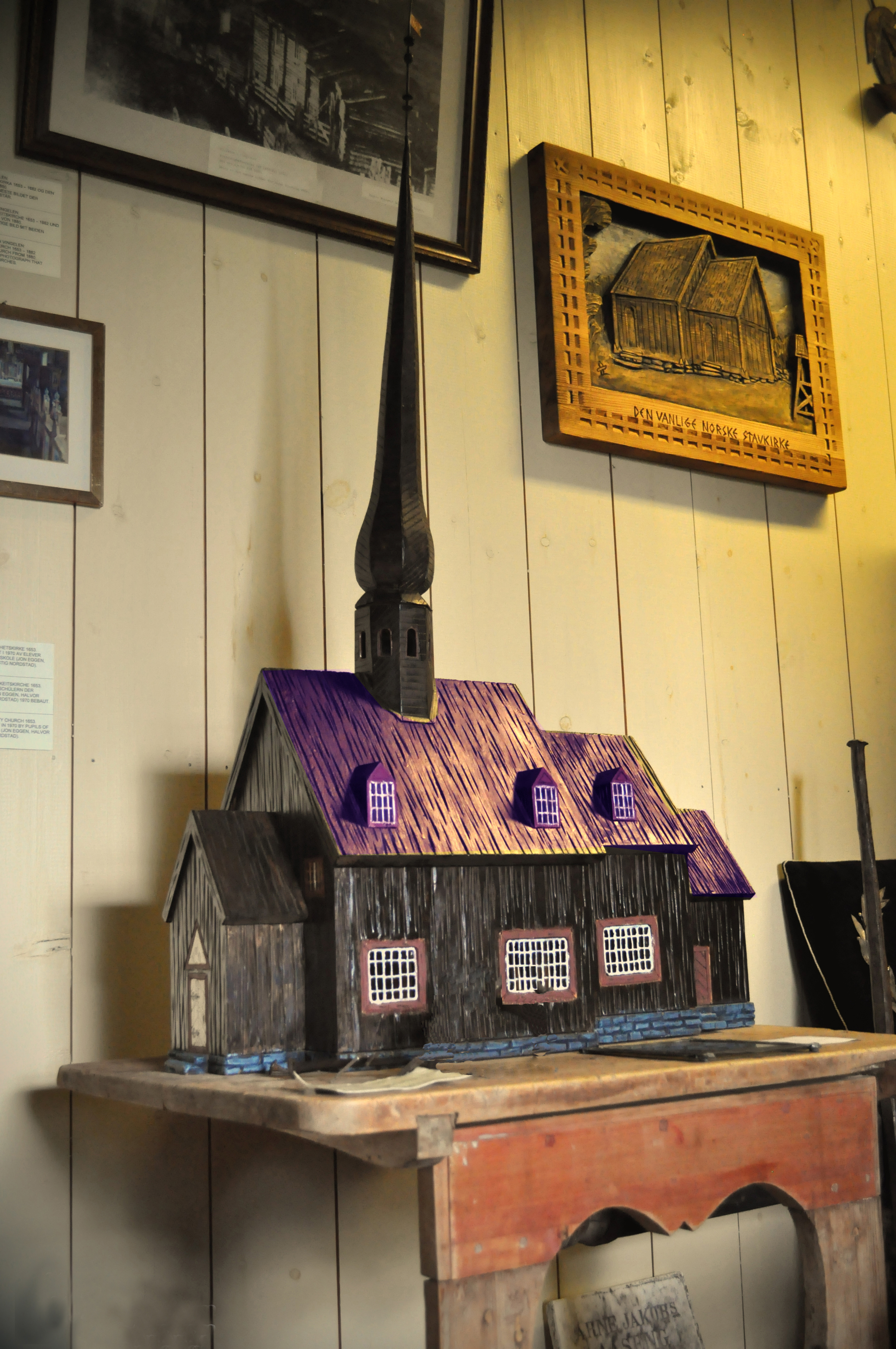
Model of the old church (1658-1882)

== See also ==
- List of churches in Hamar
