= Vingelen =

Village in Tolga Municipality, Norway

- Village
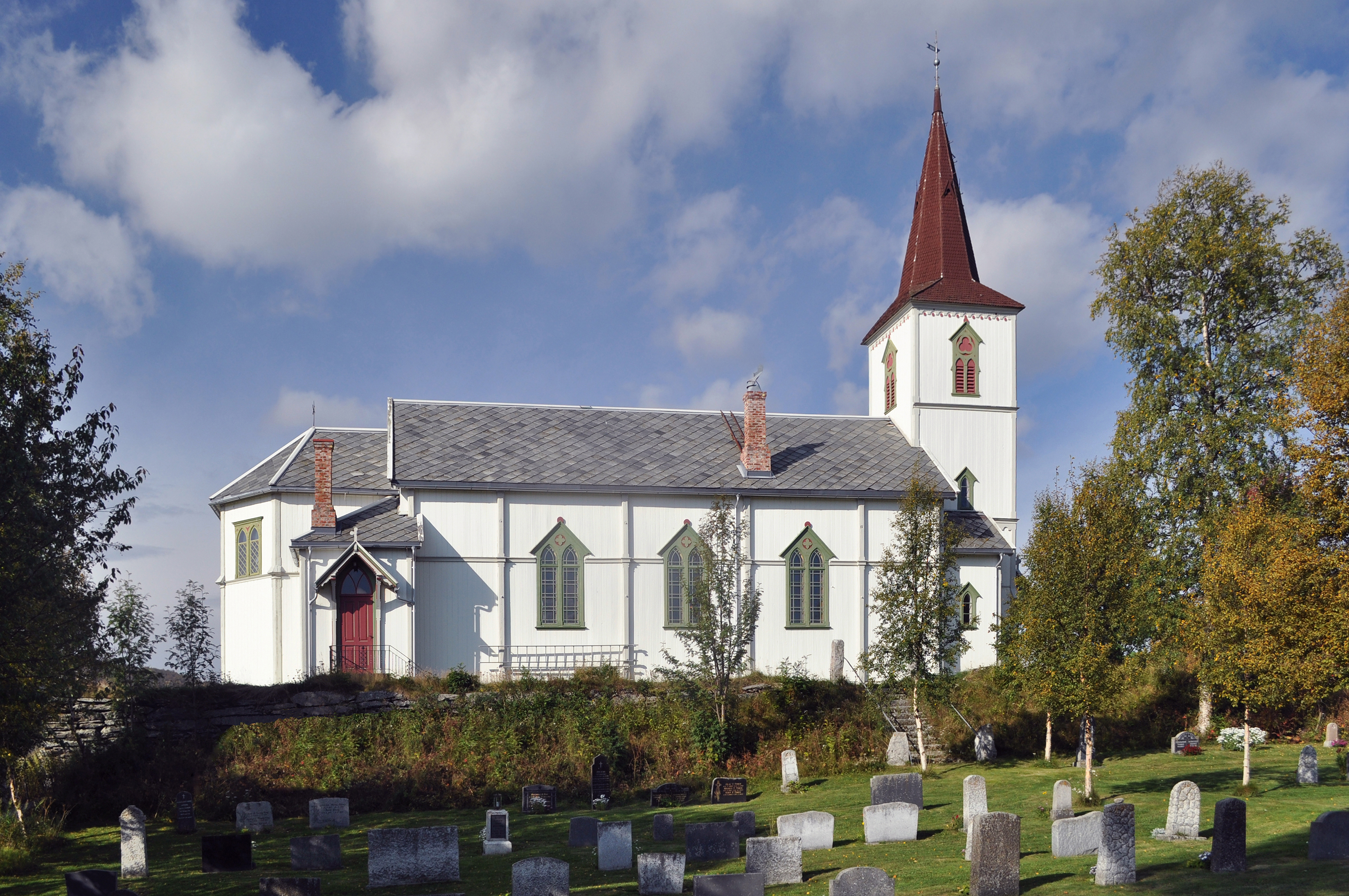
- View of the village church
- Interactive map of Vingelen
- Location within Innlandet Location within Norway
- Coordinates: 62.41723°N 10.86191°E
- Country: Norway
- Region: Eastern Norway
- County: Innlandet
- District: Østerdalen
- Municipality: Tolga Municipality
- Elevation: 693 m (2,274 ft)
- Time zone: UTC+01:00 (CET)
  - Summer (DST): UTC+02:00 (CEST)
- Post Code: 2542 Vingelen

Vingelen is a village in Tolga Municipality in Innlandet county, Norway. The village is located in the northwestern part of the municipality, about 8 kilometres (5.0 mi) to the west of the village of Tolga. The Forollhogna National Park lies about 10 kilometres (6.2 mi) north of the village.

Vingelen Church has been located in the village for centuries. This village was the main village in the Tolga area until the 1600s when the village of Tolga grew up around a smelter that was built along the river Glåma. The people of Vingelen have historically worked in the agriculture and forestry industries.

== Media gallery ==
View of the historic Oustad søndre farm (c. 1959)

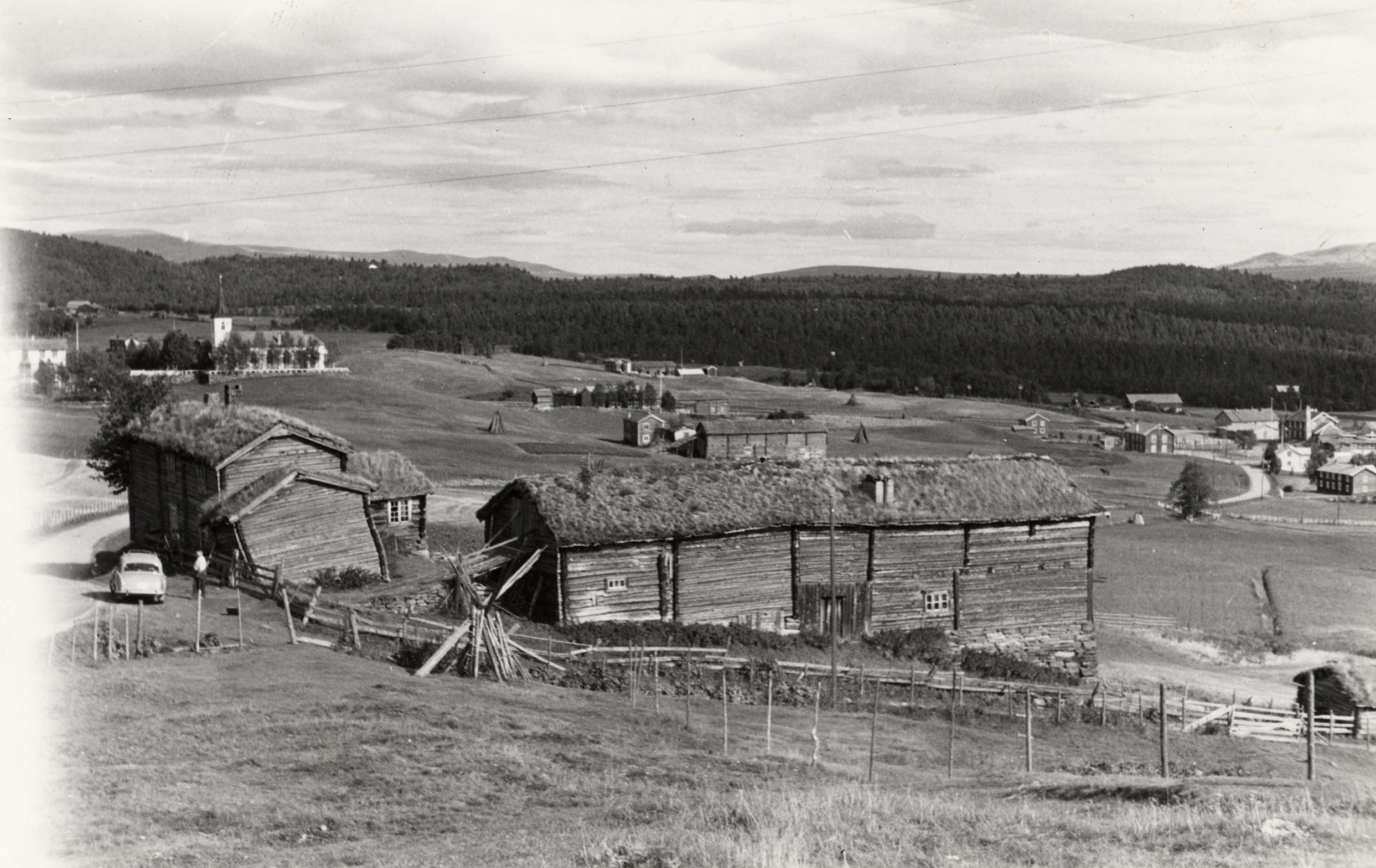

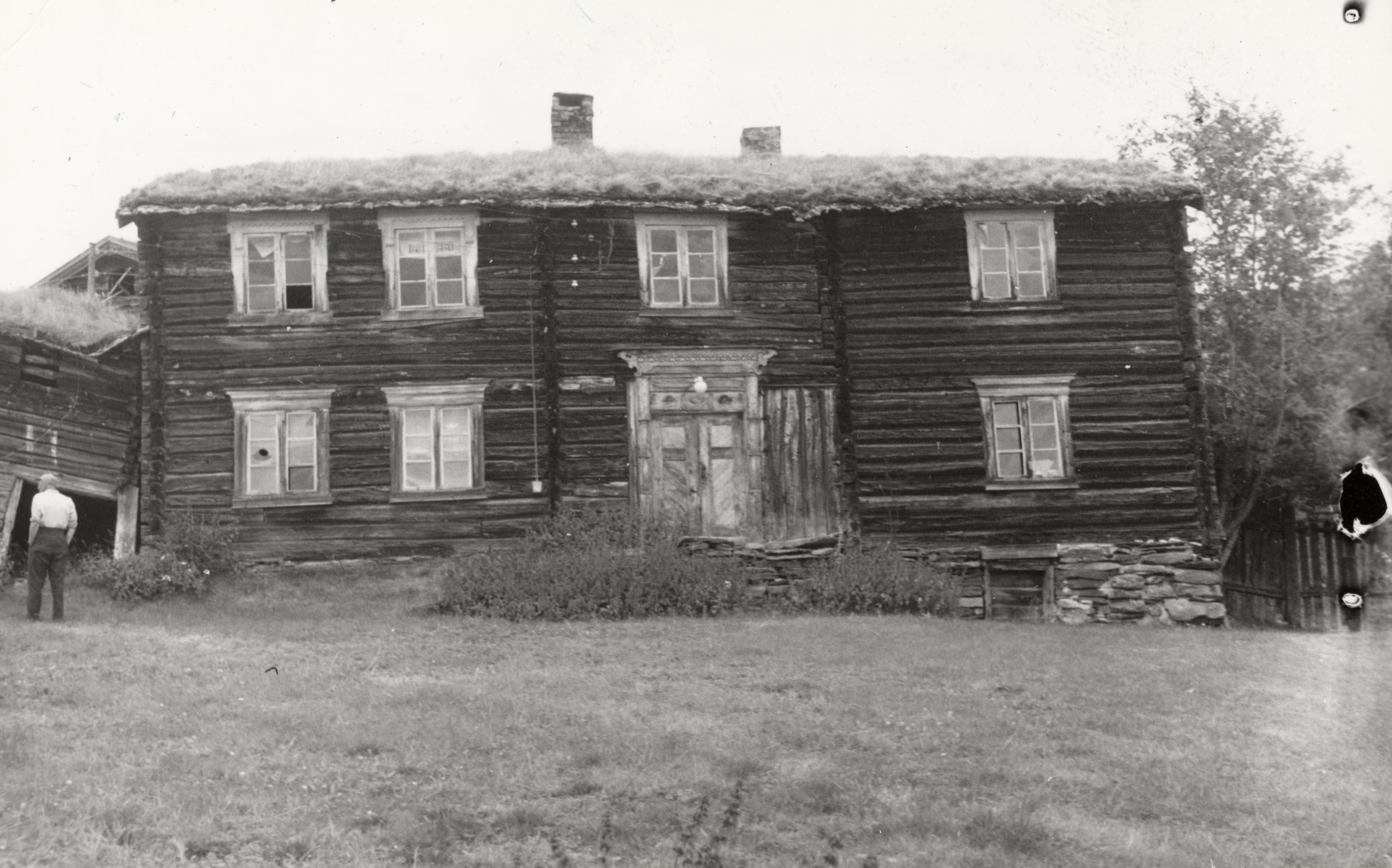

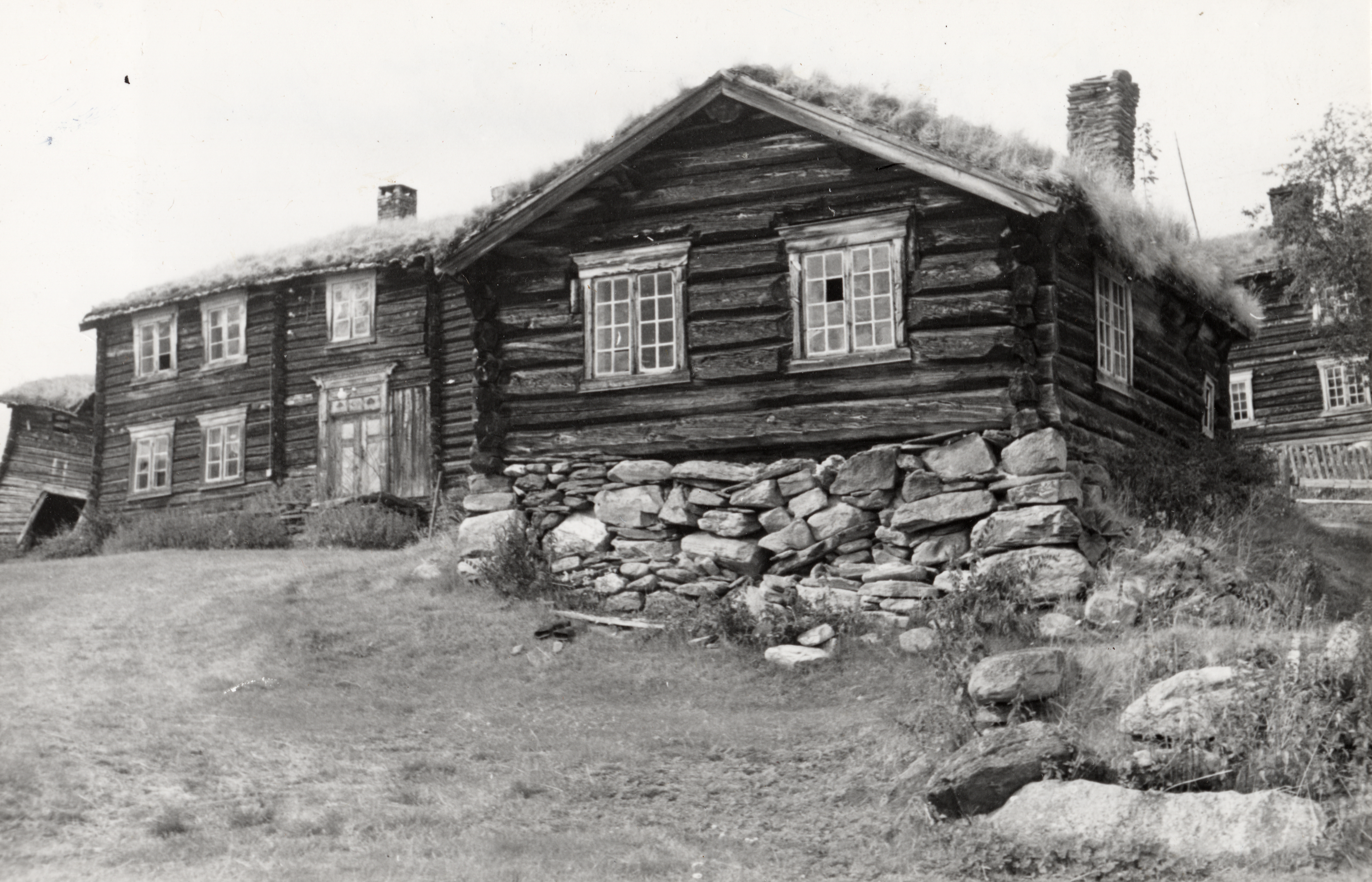

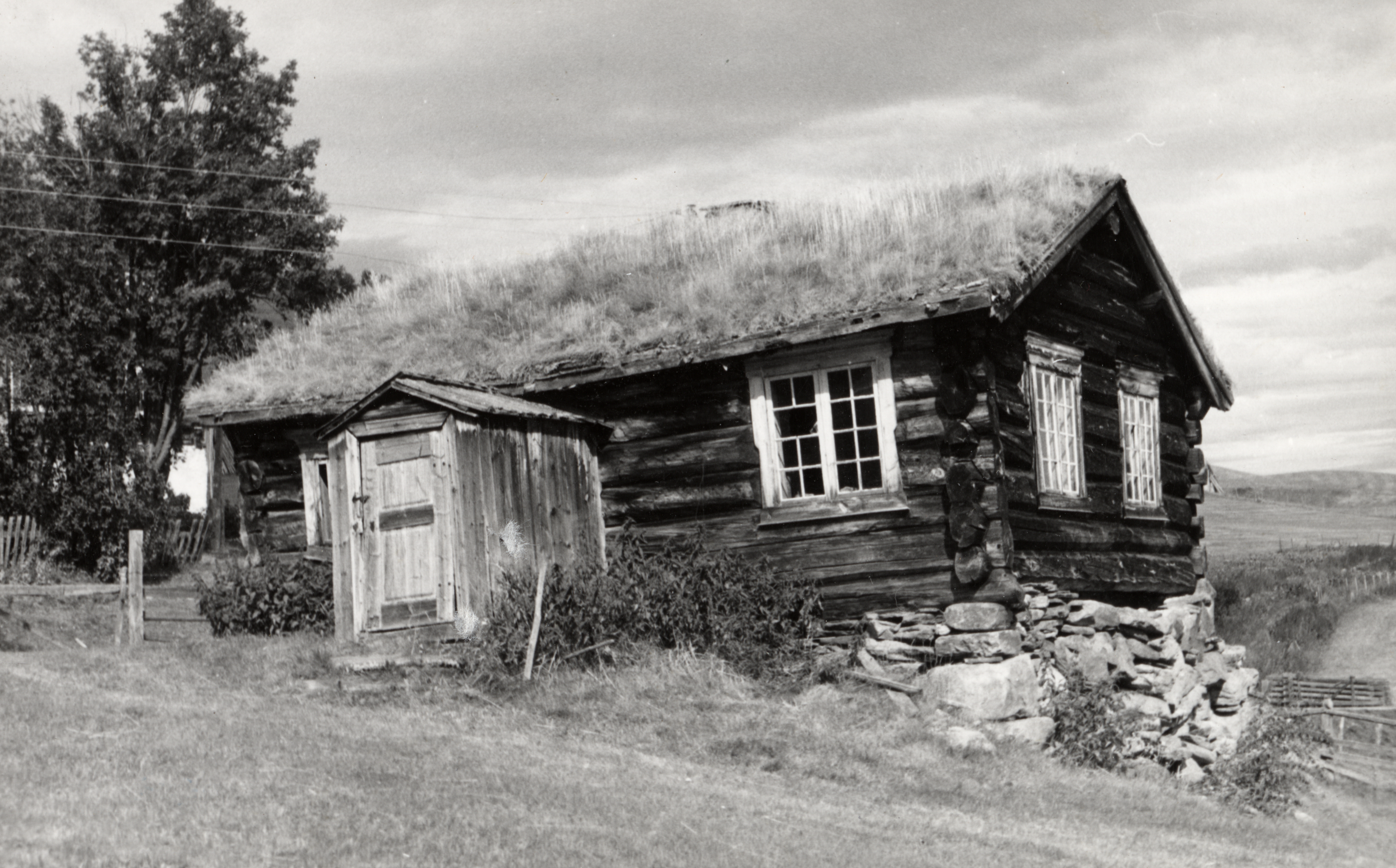

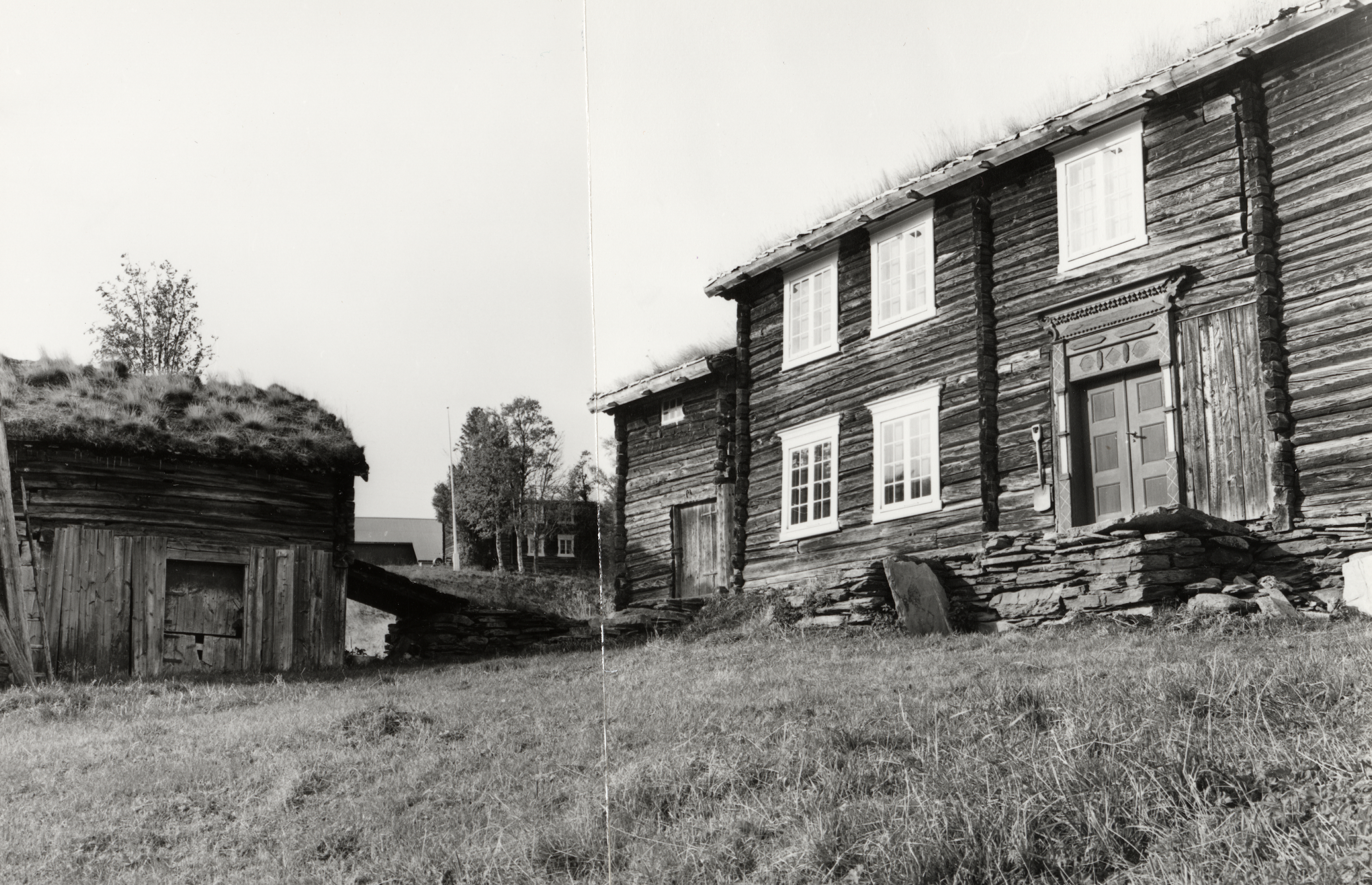
