= 2nd World Festival of Youth and Students =

1949 youth festival in Budapest, Hungarian People's Republic

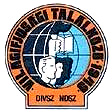
- Host country: Second Hungarian Republic
- Dates: 27 July - 3 August 1949
- Motto: Youth Unite! Forward for Lasting Peace, Democracy, National Independence and a Better Future for the People!
- Cities: Budapest
- Participants: 20,000 people from 82 countries
- Follows: 3rd World Festival of Youth and Students
- Precedes: 1st World Festival of Youth and Students

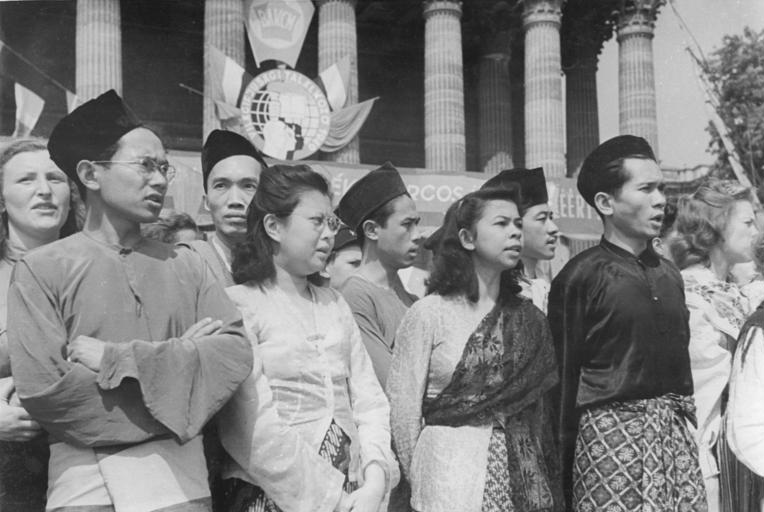
Indonesians at the 2nd Festival

The 2nd World Festival of Youth and Students (WFYS) was held from 27 July to 3 August 1949 in Budapest, capital city of the then Hungarian People's Republic, a city still recuperating from World War II.

== Organisation and events ==
The 2nd WFYS was one of three major youth events held in Communist Hungary in 1949, along with the World University Summer Games and the World Youth Congress. It was organised by the World Federation of Democratic Youth and the International Union of Students.

On 14 August 1949, 20,000 young people from 82 countries gathered in the Ujpest Stadium, opening the festival. For two weeks, the participants took part in cultural, sport, and political activities. The festival expressed its solidarity for the "anti-colonialist struggle" of the peoples of Indonesia, Malaysia and French Indochina and also for the "anti-fascist struggle" of the Spanish and Greek peoples. It was the first time that a delegation from what would become East Germany took part.

It featured a sports programme, including an athletics competition.

The motto of the festival was: Youth Unite! Forward for Lasting Peace, Democracy, National Independence and a Better Future for the People!
