= Davorin Marčelja =

Personal information
- Nationality: Croatian
- Born: 13 January 1924; Kastav, Kingdom of Serbs, Croats, and Slovenes
- Died: 2 June 2011 (aged 87); Zagreb, Croatia

Sport
- Sport: Athletics
- Event: Decathlon

Davorin Marčelja (13 January 1924 – 2 June 2011) was a Croatian athlete. He competed in the men's decathlon at the 1948 Summer Olympics, representing Yugoslavia.
