= Henry Brault =

French sprinter (1928–2020)

Henri Yves Brault (29 March 1928 – 29 May 2020) was a French sprinter who competed in the 1952 Summer Olympics.
