= Adolf Turakainen =

Finnish sprinter

Personal information
- Nationality: Finnish
- Born: 25 March 1932
- Died: 26 October 1996 (aged 64)

Sport
- Sport: Sprinting
- Event: 200 metres

Adolf Turakainen (25 March 1932 – 26 October 1996) was a Finnish sprinter. He competed in the men's 200 metres at the 1952 Summer Olympics. He also worked for Yleisradio.
