= Ans Koning =

Dutch javelin thrower

Personal information
- Born: 27 March 1923 The Hague, the Netherlands
- Died: 22 July 2006 (aged 83) Capelle aan den IJssel, the Netherlands

Sport
- Sport: Javelin throw
- Club: GONA, Den Haag
Medal record
Women's athletics
Representing the Netherlands
European Championships
Bronze medal – third place	1946 Oslo	Javelin throw

Johanna "Ans" Koning (27 March 1923 – 22 July 2006) was a Dutch javelin thrower. She competed at the 1948 Summer Olympics and finished in 6th place. Two years earlier she won a bronze medal at the 1946 European Athletics Championships.
