= Elly Dammers =

Dutch javelin thrower

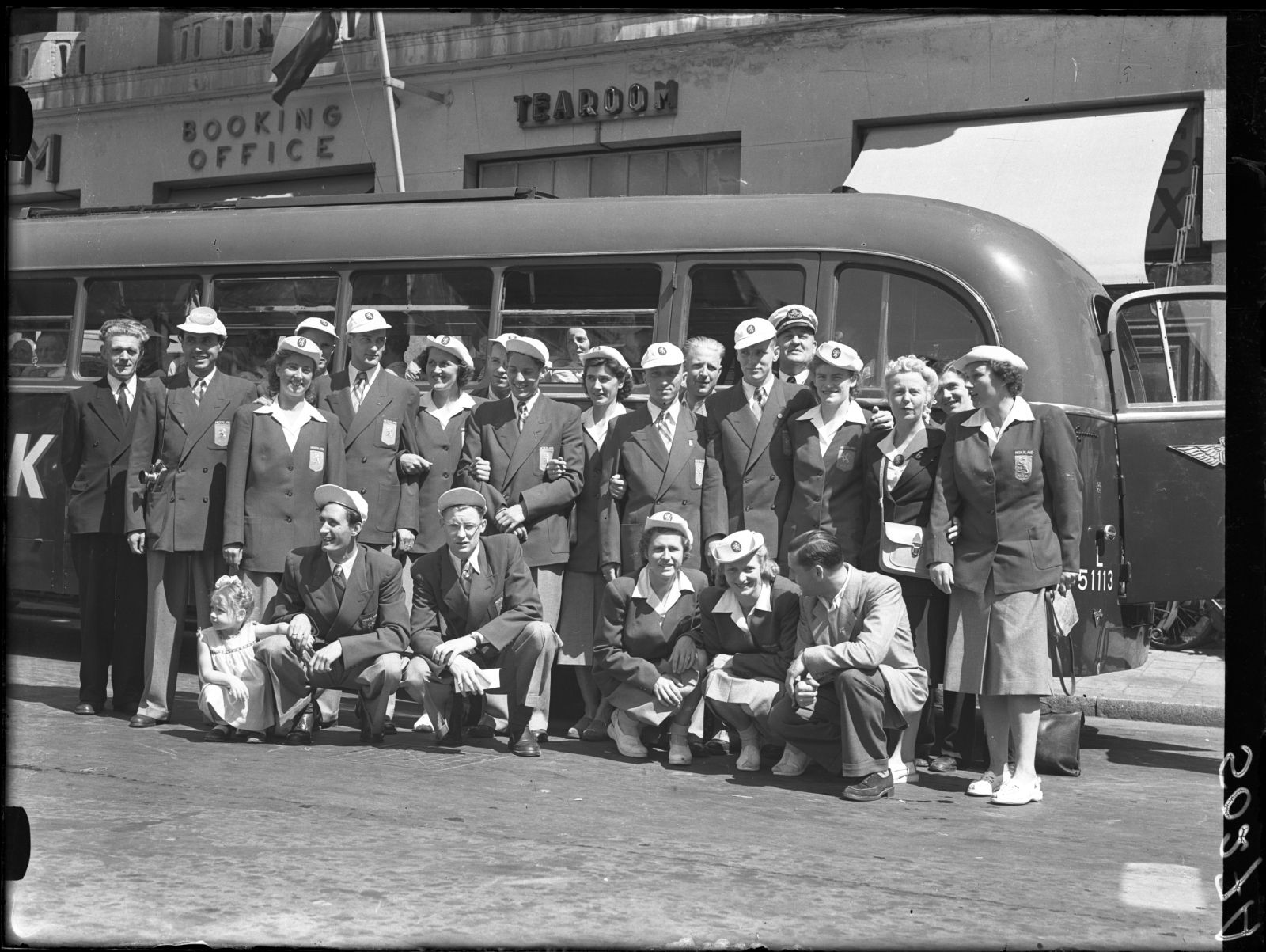
- The Olympic track and field team departs from Leidseplein to Schiphol Airport

Personal information
- Full name: Elizabeth Dammers
- Born: 15 August 1921 Amsterdam, the Netherlands
- Died: 3 January 2009 (aged 87) Houten, the Netherlands

Sport
- Sport: Javelin throw
- Club: Zeeburg, Amsterdam

Elizabeth "Elly" Dammers (15 August 1921 – 3 January 2009) was a Dutch javelin thrower. She competed at the 1948 Summer Olympics and finished in 8th place.
