= Marcel Gerdil =

French sprinter

Personal information
- Nationality: French
- Born: January 24, 1928
- Died: February 20, 2012 (aged 84)

Marcel Gerdil (24 January 1928 – 20 February 2012) was a French sprinter who competed in the 1952 Summer Olympics.
