= Herma Bauma =

Austrian athlete and handballer (1915–2003)

Medal record

Representing Austria

Women's athletics

Olympic Games
Gold medal – first place	1948 London	Javelin throw

European Championships
Silver medal – second place	1950 Brussels	Javelin throw

Women's World Games
Silver medal – second place	1934 London	Javelin throw

Women's field handball

World Championship
Silver medal – second place	1949 Hungary	Team

Hermine "Herma" Bauma (23 January 1915 – 9 February 2003) was an Austrian athlete who competed mainly in the javelin. She also was famous for playing handball, and she is the Austrian Handball Hall of Fame.

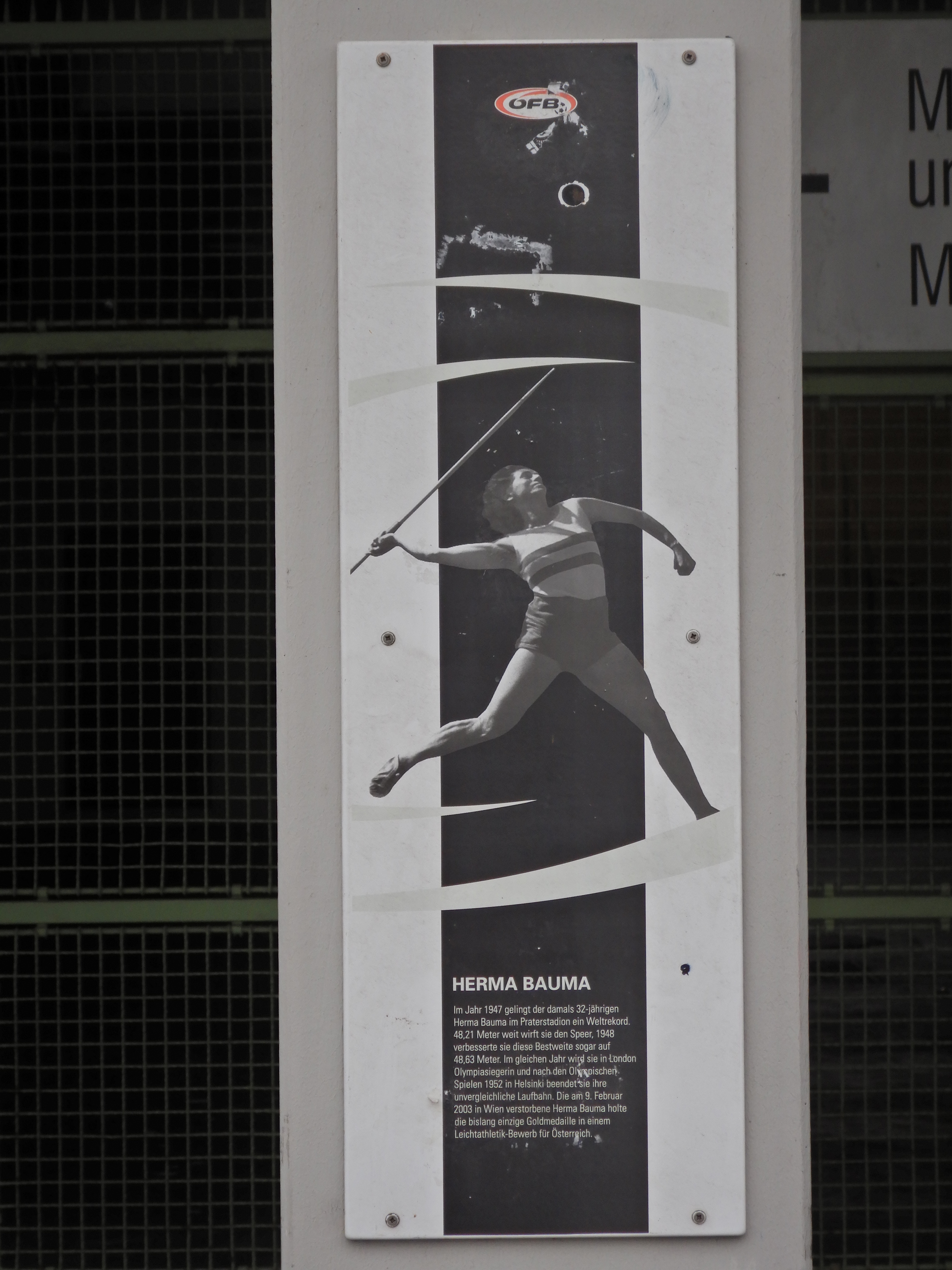

Bauma competed for Austria at the 1948 Summer Olympics held in London, United Kingdom in the javelin where she won the gold medal.

Bauma was born in Vienna, then part of Austria-Hungary, on 23 January 1915. She died in Vienna on 9 February 2003, at the age of 88.

In handball she was part of the team that won silver medals at the 1949 World Championship in field handball. At club level she played for Danubia Wien, where she won several Austrian championships.
