= Ivan Pozhidayev =

Russian long-distance runner

Personal information
- Born: 3 September 1919 Krutye Luki, Russian SFSR
- Died: 2 November 2013 (aged 94)

Ivan Pozhidayev (3 September 1919 – 2 November 2013) was a Russian long-distance runner who competed in the 1952 Summer Olympics.

In his lifetime, he won a total of one bronze medal—in the 1949 International Universities Champs. He won it in the 500m race, which he completed in 15:03.4.
