= Peter Kraus (athlete) =

German sprinter

Personal information
- Nationality: German
- Born: 17 July 1932 Berlin, Weimar Republic
- Died: 15 January 2016 (aged 83) Straßlach-Dingharting, Germany

Sport
- Sport: Sprinting
- Event: 200 metres

Peter Kraus (17 July 1932 – 15 January 2016) was a German sprinter. He competed in the men's 200 metres at the 1952 Summer Olympics.
