= 3rd World Festival of Youth and Students =

1951 youth festival in East Berlin, East Germany

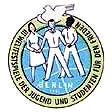
- Host country: German Democratic Republic
- Dates: 5–19 August 1951
- Motto: Peace and Friendship Against Nuclear Weapons
- Cities: Berlin
- Participants: 26,000 people from 104 countries
- Follows: 4th World Festival of Youth and Students
- Precedes: 2nd World Festival of Youth and Students

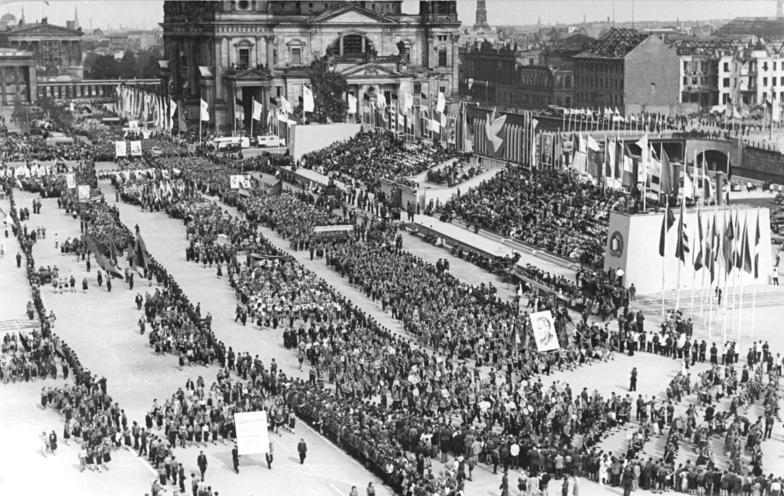
Demonstration at the 3rd Festival

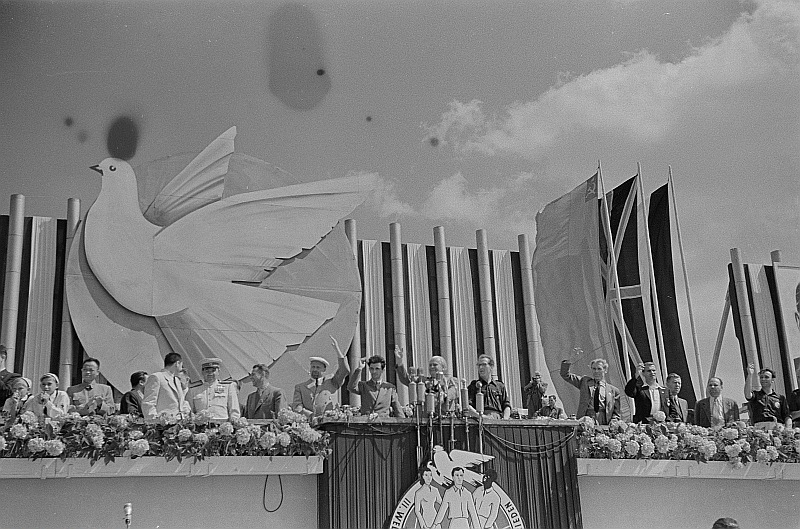
Walter Ulbricht, Enrico Berlinguer, Wilhelm Pieck and Erich Honecker viewing the athlete's parade

The 3rd World Festival of Youth and Students (WFYS) was held from 5 to 19 August 1951 in East Berlin, capital city of the then German Democratic Republic, and organised by World Federation of Democratic Youth. The motto of the festival was "Peace and Friendship against Nuclear Weapons"

== Organisation and events ==
The third WFYS was held in a period of growing international tension between the Soviet Union and the western powers; it took place against the background of the Korean War and the spread of communism in Central Europe and China. The festival was meant to showcase the young German Democratic Republic, formed in the Soviet sector of postwar Germany.

West German police and the US military tried to prevent international delegates from crossing the western sector of Germany to attend the festival. In response, an operation was arranged to smuggle young people across the country in small groups. Jan Myrdal wrote about incidents where young people were shot at by West Berlin police when trying to cross the West German border.

The festival's sports programme featured an athletics competition.
