= Colette Elloy =

French hurdler

Personal information
- Nationality: French
- Born: 24 April 1931 (age 95)

Sport
- Sport: Track and field
- Event: 80 metres hurdles

Colette Elloy (born 5 July 1931) is a French hurdler. She competed in the women's 80 metres hurdles at the 1952 Summer Olympics.
