= Olga Šicnerová =

Czech sprinter (1928–2021)

Personal information
- Nationality: Czechoslovakia
- Born: 1 June 1928 Břeclav, Czechoslovakia
- Died: 21 August 2021 (aged 93) Boskovice, Czech Republic

Sport
- Sport: Sprinting
- Event: 100 metres

Olga Oldřichová, née Šicnerová (1 June 1928 – 21 August 2021) was a Czech sprinter. She competed in the women's 100 metres at the 1948 Summer Olympics. Oldřichová also had five national titles and set national records in sprinting.

Oldřichová died in Boskovice on 21 August 2021, at the age of 93.
