= Paul Dolan (athlete) =

Irish sprinter

Personal information
- Nationality: Irish
- Born: 29 June 1927 Ballyshannon, Ireland
- Died: 19 September 1998 (aged 71) Dublin, Ireland
- Height: 185 cm (6 ft 1 in)
- Weight: 78 kg (172 lb)

Sport
- Sport: Athletics
- Event: Sprinting/400m
- Club: Clonliffe Harriers, Dublin

Paul Dolan (29 June 1927 – 19 September 1998) was an Irish sprinter who competed at the 1948 Summer Olympics and the 1952 Summer Olympics.

== Biography ==
Dolan represented Ireland at the 1948 Olympic Games in London, where he competed in the 4 x 400 metres relay competition.

Dolan finished third behind Leslie Lewis in the 440 yards event at the british 1950 AAA Championships.

Dolan represented Ireland at the 1952 Olympic Games in Helsinki, where he competed in the 100 metres, 200 metres and 400 metres competitions.

== Competition record ==
Year	Competition	Venue	Position	Event	Notes
Representing Ireland
1952	Olympics	Helsinki, Finland	3rd, Heat 2	100 m	11.12/11.0
