= Ivan Semyonov (athlete) =

Soviet athlete

Personal information
- Full name: Ivan Mikhaylovich Semyonov
- Nationality: Soviet
- Born: 2 March 1924 Dodonovo, Russian SFSR
- Died: 1966 (aged 41–42)

Sport
- Sport: Long-distance running
- Event: 5000 metres

Ivan Mikhaylovich Semyonov (Russian: Иван Михайлович Семёнов, 2 March 1924 – 1966) was a Soviet long-distance runner. He competed in the men's 5000 metres at the 1952 Summer Olympics.
