= Miroslav Horčic =

Czech sprinter

Personal information
- Nationality: Czechoslovak
- Born: 3 August 1921
- Died: 14 January 2017 (aged 95)

Sport
- Sport: Sprinting
- Event: 100 metres

Miroslav Horčic (3 August 1921 – 14 January 2017) was a Czechoslovak sprinter. He competed in the men's 100 metres at the 1952 Summer Olympics.
